= First Turnbull ministry =

69th ministry of government of Australia

- 69th ministry of Australia

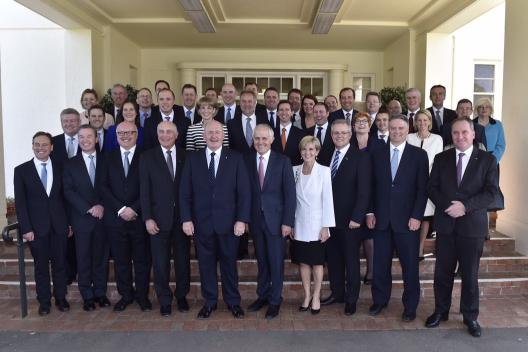
- Governor-General Sir Peter Cosgrove with first arrangement of newly appointed ministers to the Turnbull ministry
- Date formed: 15 September 2015
- Date dissolved: 19 July 2016

People and organisations
- Monarch: Elizabeth II
- Governor-General: Sir Peter Cosgrove
- Prime Minister: Malcolm Turnbull
- Deputy Prime Minister: Warren Truss (2015–16); Barnaby Joyce (2016)
- No. of ministers: 30
- Member party: Liberal–National coalition
- Status in legislature: Coalition majority government
- Opposition cabinet: Shorten shadow ministry
- Opposition party: Labor
- Opposition leader: Bill Shorten

History
- Outgoing election: 2 July 2016
- Legislature term: 44th
- Predecessor: Abbott ministry
- Successor: Second Turnbull ministry

The first Turnbull ministry (Liberal–National Coalition) was the 69th ministry of the Government of Australia, led by Prime Minister Malcolm Turnbull. It succeeded the Abbott ministry after a leadership spill that took place on 14 September 2015 ended Prime Minister Tony Abbott's leadership of the Liberal Party of Australia. On 15 September, the National Party confirmed, after successful negotiations, that it would continue a coalition agreement with the Liberal Party, guaranteeing the Turnbull government a majority in the Australian House of Representatives.

The Turnbull ministry carried over from its predecessor Abbott ministry, until Turnbull announced significant ministerial changes on 20 September 2015 which took effect the following day. On 29 December 2015, Jamie Briggs resigned from his portfolio following a complaint regarding a late night incident with a public servant; and on the same day, Mal Brough stood aside pending Australian Federal Police investigations into the James Ashby affair.

A second rearrangement was announced on 13 February 2016 following the retirements of Andrew Robb on 10 February 2016 and Warren Truss on 11 February, and the resignations from the ministry of Stuart Robert on 12 February and Mal Brough on 13 February. The second arrangement was sworn in by the Governor-General on 18 February.

== First arrangement ==
The first arrangement of the Turnbull ministry was sworn in on 21 September 2015^{a} and continued until 18 February 2016. Like the Abbott ministry, the Turnbull ministry contained 30 ministers, but the number of ministers in the cabinet was increased from 19 to 21, with the outer ministry being reduced from 11 to 9. There were five women in the cabinet and there was one woman in the outer ministry. There were an additional 12 assistant ministers, three of which were women.

Minor changes to the Turnbull ministry took place following the resignation of Jamie Briggs and standing down of Mal Brough on 29 December 2015 and continued until 13 February 2016 when a rearrangement took place following the retirements of Andrew Robb (on 10 February 2016) and Warren Truss (on 11 February), and the resignations of Stuart Robert (on 12 February) and Brough (on 13 February).

=== Cabinet ===
Party	Minister	Portfolio
Liberal	Malcolm Turnbull MP	Prime Minister; Leader of the Liberal Party
LNP	Warren Truss MP	Deputy Prime Minister; Minister for Infrastructure and Regional Development; Leader of the National Party (until 11 February 2016)
Liberal	Julie Bishop MP	Minister for Foreign Affairs; Deputy Leader of the Liberal Party
LNP	Senator George Brandis	Attorney-General; Leader of the Government in the Senate; Vice-President of the Executive Council
Liberal	Senator Mathias Cormann	Minister for Finance; Deputy Leader of the Government in the Senate; Special Minister of State (acting, from 29 December)
Liberal	Scott Morrison MP	Treasurer
National	Barnaby Joyce MP	Leader of the National Party (from 11 February 2016); Minister for Agriculture and Water Resources; Deputy Leader of the National Party (until 11 February 2016)
Liberal	Christopher Pyne MP	Minister for Industry, Innovation and Science; Leader of the House
CLP	Senator Nigel Scullion	Minister for Indigenous Affairs; Leader of the Nationals in the Senate
Liberal	Senator Marise Payne	Minister for Defence; Minister for Defence Materiel (acting, from 29 December 2015)
Liberal	Sussan Ley MP	Minister for Health; Minister for Sport; Minister for Aged Care (from 30 September 2015)
Liberal	Senator Simon Birmingham	Minister for Education and Training
Liberal	Senator Michaelia Cash	Minister for Employment; Minister for Women; Minister Assisting the Prime Minister on the Public Service
Liberal	Christian Porter MP	Minister for Social Services
Liberal	Kelly O'Dwyer MP	Minister for Small Business; Assistant Treasurer
Liberal	Andrew Robb MP	Minister for Trade and Investment
Liberal	Greg Hunt MP	Minister for the Environment; Minister for Cities and the Built Environment (acting, from 29 December 2015)
LNP	Peter Dutton MP	Minister for Immigration and Border Protection
Liberal	Senator Mitch Fifield	Minister for Communications; Minister for the Arts; Minister Assisting the Prime Minister for Digital Government
Liberal	Josh Frydenberg MP	Minister for Resources, Energy and Northern Australia
Liberal	Senator Arthur Sinodinos	Cabinet Secretary

=== Outer ministry ===
Party	Minister	Portfolio
Liberal	Paul Fletcher MP	Minister for Territories, Local Government and Major Projects
LNP	Steven Ciobo MP	Minister for International Development and the Pacific
Liberal	Senator Richard Colbeck	Minister for Tourism and International Education; Minister Assisting the Minister for Trade and Investment
LNP	Mal Brough MP^{b} (resigned)	Special Minister of State (until 29 December 2015); Minister for Defence Materiel and Science (until 29 December 2015)
Liberal	Jamie Briggs MP^{b} (resigned)	Minister for Cities and the Built Environment (until 29 December 2015)
National	Senator Fiona Nash	Minister for Rural Health; Deputy Leader of the National Party (from 11 February 2016)
LNP	Stuart Robert MP	Minister for Veterans' Affairs (until 12 February 2016); Minister for Human Services (until 12 February 2016); Minister Assisting the Prime Minister for the Centenary of ANZAC (until 12 February 2016)
Liberal	Michael Keenan MP	Minister for Justice; Minister Assisting the Prime Minister on Counter-Terrorism
National	Luke Hartsuyker MP	Minister for Vocational Education and Skills; Deputy Leader of the House

=== Assistant ministers (parliamentary secretaries) ===
Assistant ministers (other than the assistant treasurer) are sworn in and designated as parliamentary secretaries under the Ministers of State Act 1952. However, ministers of state who were sworn in as parliamentary secretaries on 21 September 2015 and 30 September 2015 are now referred to by Turnbull as Assistant Ministers to provide greater clarity. Legislation has not been enacted to effect any change.

Party	Minister	Portfolio
Liberal	Alan Tudge MP	Assistant Minister to the Prime Minister; Assistant Minister for Social Services (from 30 September)
LNP	Senator James McGrath	Assistant Minister to the Prime Minister
Liberal	Dr Peter Hendy MP	Assistant Minister for Productivity
Liberal	Senator Scott Ryan	Assistant Cabinet Secretary
National	Michael McCormack MP	Assistant Minister to the Deputy Prime Minister
LNP	Karen Andrews MP	Assistant Minister for Science
LNP	Wyatt Roy MP	Assistant Minister for Innovation
Liberal	Ken Wyatt AM MP	Assistant Minister for Health (from 30 September)
Liberal	Alex Hawke MP	Assistant Minister to the Treasurer
Liberal	Senator Concetta Fierravanti-Wells	Assistant Minister for Multicultural Affairs
Liberal	Senator Anne Ruston	Assistant Minister for Agriculture and Water Resources
National	Darren Chester MP	Assistant Minister for Defence

== Second arrangement ==
A second rearrangement of the Turnbull ministry was announced on 13 February 2016 following the retirements of Andrew Robb on 10 February 2016 and Warren Truss on 11 February, and the resignations of Stuart Robert on 12 February and Mal Brough on 13 February. The new ministry took office on 18 February.

Following the resignation of Truss as the Nationals' leader, Barnaby Joyce became the new National Party leader with effect from 11 February, while Fiona Nash became the National's new deputy leader and the first woman to hold this position. Joyce became the new Deputy Prime Minister with effect from 18 February. The number of Nationals, as cabinet members, increased from three to four with Nash, and Darren Chester becoming cabinet members.

Nash became Minister for Rural Health, Regional Communications and Regional Development. Chester became Minister for Infrastructure and Transport. Steven Ciobo became Trade Minister and also moved into the cabinet. Senator Matt Canavan became Minister for Northern Australia. Finance Minister Mathias Cormann retained Special Minister of State in which he had been acting for Mal Brough when Brough had earlier stood aside pending the outcome of Australian Federal Police investigations. Senator Scott Ryan became Minister for Vocational Education and Skills, while Alan Tudge became Minister for Human Services, Dan Tehan became Defence Materiel and Veterans Services Minister. Senator Concetta Fierravanti-Wells became Minister for International Development and the Pacific. Robb became Special Envoy for Trade until the next election.

The cabinet was increased to 22 ministers, while the outer ministry was reduced to 8. There are six women in the cabinet and another one in the outer ministry and three assistant ministers.

=== Cabinet ===
Party	Minister	Portrait	Offices
Liberal	Malcolm Turnbull (born 1961) MP for Wentworth (NSW) (2004–2018)		Prime Minister; Leader of the Liberal Party
National	Barnaby Joyce (born 1967) MP for New England (NSW) (2013-)		Deputy Prime Minister; Minister for Agriculture and Water Resources; Leader of the National Party
Liberal	Julie Bishop (born 1956) MP for Curtin (WA) (1998-2019)		Minister for Foreign Affairs; Deputy Leader of the Liberal Party
National	Fiona Nash (born 1965) Senator for New South Wales (2005-2017)		Minister for Regional Communications; Minister for Regional Development; Minister for Rural Health; Deputy Leader of the National Party
National (LNP)	George Brandis (born 1957) Senator for Queensland (2000-2018)		Attorney-General; Vice-President of the Executive Council; Leader of the Government in the Senate
Liberal	Scott Morrison (born 1968) MP for Cook (NSW) (2007-2024)		Treasurer
Liberal	Mathias Cormann (born 1970) Senator for Western Australia (2007-2020)		Minister for Finance; Deputy Leader of the Government in the Senate; Special Minister of State
Liberal	Christopher Pyne (born 1967) MP for Sturt (SA) (1993-2019)		Minister for Industry, Innovation and Science; Leader of the House
National (CLP)	Nigel Scullion (born 1956) Senator for the Northern Territory (2001-2019)		Minister for Indigenous Affairs; Leader of the National Party in the Senate
Liberal (LNP)	Peter Dutton (born 1965) MP for Dickson (QLD) (2001-2025)		Minister for Immigration and Border Protection
Liberal	Greg Hunt (born 1965) MP for Flinders (VIC) (2001-2022)		Minister for the Environment
Liberal	Sussan Ley (born 1961) MP for Farrer (NSW) (2001-2026)		Minister for Health; Minister for Aged Care; Minister for Sport
Liberal	Marise Payne (born 1964) Senator for New South Wales (1997-2023)		Minister for Defence
Liberal	Mitch Fifield (born 1967) Senator for Victoria (2004-2019)		Minister for Communications; Minister for the Arts
Liberal	Michaelia Cash (born 1970) Senator for Western Australia (2008-)		Minister for Employment; Minister for Women; Minister Assisting the Prime Minister for the Public Service
Liberal	Christian Porter (born 1970) MP for Pearce (WA) (2013-2022)		Minister for Social Services
Liberal	Simon Birmingham (born 1974) Senator for South Australia (2007-2025)		Minister for Education and Training
Liberal	Arthur Sinodinos (born 1957) Senator for New South Wales (2011-2019)		Cabinet Secretary
Liberal (LNP)	Steven Ciobo (born 1974) MP for Moncrieff (QLD) (2001-2019)		Minister for Trade and Investment
National)	Darren Chester (born 1967) MP for Gippsland (VIC) (2008-)		Minister for Infrastructure and Transport
Liberal	Kelly O’Dwyer (born 1977) MP for Higgins (VIC) (2009-2019)		Minister for Small Business; Assistant Treasurer
Liberal	Josh Frydenberg (born 1971) MP for Kooyong (VIC) (2010-2022)		Resources and Energy

=== Outer ministry ===
Party	Minister	Portrait	Offices
Liberal	Paul Fletcher (born 1965) MP for Bradfield (NSW) (2009-2025)		Minister for Territories, Local Government and Major Projects
Liberal	Concetta Fierravanti-Wells (born 1960) Senator for New South Wales (2005-2022)		Minister for International Development and the Pacific
Liberal	Richard Colbeck (born 1958) Senator for Tasmania (2002-2016)		Minister for Tourism and International Education; Minister Assisting the Minister for Trade and Investment
Liberal	Michael Keenan (born 1972) MP for Stirling (WA) (2004-2019)		Minister for Justice; Minister Assisting the Prime Minister for Counter-Terrorism
National (LNP)	Matt Canavan (born 1980) Senator for Queensland (2014-) (until 25 July 2017)		Minister for Northern Australia
Liberal	Dan Tehan (born 1968) MP for Wannon (VIC) (2010-)		Minister for Veterans' Affairs; Minister for Defence Personnel; Minister Assisting the Prime Minister for the Centenary of ANZAC
Liberal	Alan Tudge (born 1961) MP for Aston (VIC) (2010-2023)		Minister for Human Services
Liberal	Scott Ryan (born 1973) Senator for Victoria (2008-2021)		Minister for Vocational Education and Skills

=== Assistant ministers (parliamentary secretaries) ===
Party	Minister	Portfolio
Liberal	Senator James McGrath	Assistant Minister to the Prime Minister; Assistant Minister to the Minister for Immigration and Border Protection
Liberal	Angus Taylor MP	Assistant Minister to the Prime Minister for Cities and Digital Transformation
Liberal	Dr Peter Hendy MP	Assistant Cabinet Secretary; Assistant Minister for Finance
LNP	Keith Pitt MP	Assistant Minister to the Deputy Prime Minister
Liberal	Senator Anne Ruston	Assistant Minister for Agriculture and Water Resources
Liberal	Alex Hawke MP	Assistant Minister to the Treasurer
LNP	Karen Andrews MP	Assistant Minister for Science
LNP	Wyatt Roy MP	Assistant Minister for Innovation
Liberal	Ken Wyatt MP	Assistant Minister for Health and Aged Care
National	Michael McCormack MP	Assistant Minister for Defence
Liberal	Craig Laundy MP	Assistant Minister for Multicultural Affairs
LNP	Jane Prentice MP	Assistant Minister for Disability Affairs

== Whips ==
Prime Minister Turnbull announced the promotion of Nola Marino to Chief Government Whip and the promotions of Brett Whiteley and Ewen Jones to Government Whips on 27 September 2015. The Senate whip positions remained unchanged at that time.

=== House of Representatives ===
Party	Whip	Title
Liberal	Nola Marino MP	Chief Government Whip in the House of Representatives
LNP	Ewen Jones MP	Government Whip in House of Representatives
Liberal	Brett Whiteley MP	Government Whip in House of Representatives
National	Mark Coulton MP	Nationals Chief Whip in the House of Representatives
LNP	George Christensen MP	Nationals Deputy Whip in the House of Representatives

=== Senate ===
Party	Whip	Title
Liberal	Senator David Bushby	Chief Government Whip in the Senate
Liberal	Senator David Fawcett	Deputy Government Whip in the Senate
Liberal	Senator Dean Smith	Deputy Government Whip in the Senate
LNP	Senator Matt Canavan	Nationals Whip in the Senate

== See also ==
- Turnbull government
- Second Turnbull ministry

== Notes ==
a Ken Wyatt did not take his place in the executive until 30 September due to his absence from the country during the initial swearing-in.
b Minister Jamie Briggs resigned on 29 December 2015 and Mal Brough temporarily stood aside from the ministry on the same day. Subsequently, Senator Mathias Cormann and Senator Marise Payne served as Acting Special Minister of State and Acting Minister for Defence Materiel and Science respectively. Brough later resigned from the ministry on 13 February 2016.
