= Leader of the House (Australia) =

Leader in the House of Representatives of Australia

- Commonwealth Coat of Arms

- Flag of Australia

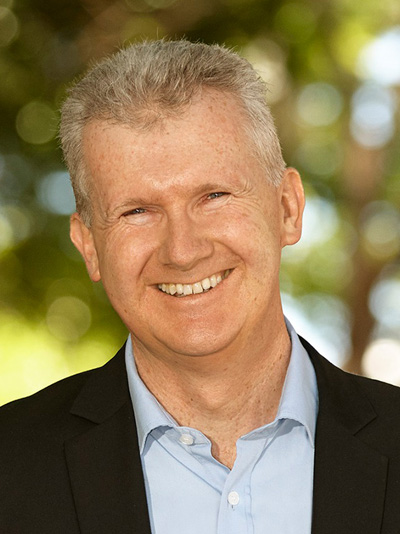
- Incumbent; Tony Burke since 1 June 2022
- Australian Government; House of Representatives
- Style: The Honourable
- Appointer: The Prime Minister of Australia
- Inaugural holder: Sir Eric Harrison
- Formation: 11 May 1951

In the Parliament of Australia, the Leader of the House is the government minister responsible for the management of government business in the House of Representatives, including the order in which the Government's agenda is to be dealt with, tactical matters in reaction to impediments to such management, negotiation with the Opposition's counterpart (the Manager of Opposition Business in the House) about the order in which bills are to be debated, and the time allotted for debates. The position is currently held by Tony Burke since June 2022.

As the Australian Parliament is bicameral, the Leader of the House must also be aware of developments in the Senate, for example, in order to anticipate whether a bill may be returned to the House with amendments.

The office was created in 1951 by the Prime Minister at the time, Robert Menzies. The Leader of the House and the Deputy Leader are appointed by the Prime Minister. The Deputy Leader's duties are largely contingent, coming into play only when the Leader of the House is absent from the House or is on leave, when they are referred to as Acting Leader of the House.

In the incumbent Albanese ministry, which took office in 2022, Tony Burke is the Leader of the House and Mark Butler his deputy. During the preceding Morrison ministry, Burke and Butler were the Manager of Opposition Business and Deputy Manager respectively.

== List of Leaders of the House ==
The following individuals have been appointed as Leader of the Australian House of Representatives:

Order	Minister	Party	Prime Minister	Portfolio	Term start	Term end	Time in office
1	Sir Eric Harrison	Liberal	Menzies	Vice-President of the Executive Council; Minister for Defence Production; Minister for Army; Minister for the Navy	11 May 1951	September 1956	5 years, 4 months
2	Harold Holt	Liberal	Menzies	Treasurer; Minister for Labour and National Service	September 1956	26 January 1966	9 years, 4 months
3	Sir David Fairbairn	Liberal	Holt	Minister for National Development	26 January 1966	October 1966	9 months
4	Billy Snedden	Liberal	Holt	Minister for Immigration	February 1967	November 1968	1 year, 9 months
4	Billy Snedden	Liberal	McEwen	Minister for Immigration	February 1967	November 1968	1 year, 9 months
4	Billy Snedden	Liberal	Gorton	Minister for Immigration	February 1967	November 1968	1 year, 9 months
5	Dudley Erwin	Liberal	Gorton	Minister for the Air	February 1969	September 1969	7 months
(4)	Billy Snedden	Liberal	Gorton	Minister for Labour and National Service	November 1969	10 March 1971	1 year, 4 months
6	Reginald Swartz	Liberal	McMahon	Minister for National Development	10 March 1971	August 1972	1 year, 5 months
7	Don Chipp	Liberal	McMahon	Minister for Customs and Excise	15 August 1972	5 December 1972	112 days
8	Fred Daly	Labor	Whitlam	Minister for Services and Property; Minister for Administrative Services	5 December 1972	11 November 1975	2 years, 341 days
9	Ian Sinclair	National Country	Fraser	Minister for Primary Industry	22 December 1975	27 September 1979	3 years, 279 days
10	Ian Viner	Liberal	Fraser	Minister for Employment and Youth Affairs	27 September 1979	19 August 1980	327 days
(9)	Ian Sinclair	National Country	Fraser	Minister for Special Trade Representations; Minister for Communications	19 August 1980	7 May 1982	1 year, 261 days
11	James Killen	Liberal	Fraser	Vice-President of the Executive Council	7 May 1982	11 March 1983	308 days
12	Mick Young	Labor	Hawke	Special Minister of State; Vice-President of the Executive Council	11 March 1983	14 July 1983	125 days
13	Lionel Bowen	Labor	Hawke	Deputy Prime Minister; Vice-President of the Executive Council	14 July 1983	21 January 1984	191 days
(12)	Mick Young	Labor	Hawke	Special Minister of State; Minister for Immigration and Ethnic Affairs; Minister for Immigration, Local Government and Ethnic Affairs; Vice-President of the Executive Council; Minister Assisting the Prime Minister for Multicultural Affairs	21 January 1984	12 February 1988	4 years, 22 days
14	Kim Beazley	Labor	Hawke	Vice-President of the Executive Council; Minister for Defence; Minister for Transport and Communications; Minister for Employment, Education and Training; Minister for Finance; Deputy Prime Minister	15 February 1988	11 March 1996	8 years, 25 days
14	Kim Beazley	Labor	Keating	Vice-President of the Executive Council; Minister for Defence; Minister for Transport and Communications; Minister for Employment, Education and Training; Minister for Finance; Deputy Prime Minister	15 February 1988	11 March 1996	8 years, 25 days
15	Peter Reith	Liberal	Howard	Minister for Industrial Relations; Minister for Workplace Relations and Small Business; Minister for Employment, Workplace Relations and Small Business; Minister Assisting the Prime Minister for the Public Service; Minister for Defence	11 March 1996	8 October 2001	5 years, 211 days
16	Tony Abbott	Liberal	Howard	Minister for Employment, Workplace Relations and Small Business; Minister for Employment and Workplace Relations; Minister Assisting the Prime Minister for the Public Service; Minister for Health and Ageing	12 February 2002	17 October 2007	5 years, 247 days
17	Anthony Albanese	Labor	Rudd	Minister for Infrastructure, Transport, Regional Development and Local Government	12 February 2008	14 September 2010	5 years, 174 days
17	Anthony Albanese	Labor	Gillard	Minister for Infrastructure, Transport, Regional Development and Local Government	12 February 2008	14 September 2010	5 years, 174 days
17	Anthony Albanese	Labor	Gillard	Minister for Infrastructure and Transport	14 September 2010	25 March 2013	5 years, 174 days
17	Anthony Albanese	Labor	Gillard	Minister for Infrastructure and Transport; Minister for Regional Development and Local Government	25 March 2013	1 July 2013	5 years, 174 days
17	Anthony Albanese	Labor	Rudd	Deputy Prime Minister; Minister for Infrastructure and Transport; Minister for Broadband, Communications and the Digital Economy	1 July 2013	5 August 2013	5 years, 174 days
18	Christopher Pyne	Liberal	Abbott	Minister for Education	12 November 2013	23 December 2014	5 years, 150 days
18	Christopher Pyne	Liberal	Abbott	Minister for Education and Training	23 December 2014	21 September 2015	5 years, 150 days
18	Christopher Pyne	Liberal	Turnbull	Minister for Industry, Innovation and Science	21 September 2015	19 July 2016	5 years, 150 days
18	Christopher Pyne	Liberal	Turnbull	Minister for Defence Industry	19 July 2016	28 August 2018	5 years, 150 days
18	Christopher Pyne	Liberal	Morrison	Minister for Defence	28 August 2018	11 April 2019	5 years, 150 days
19	Christian Porter	Liberal	Morrison	Attorney-General; Minister for Industry, Science and Technology; Minister for Industrial Relations	29 May 2019	30 March 2021	1 year, 305 days
20	Peter Dutton	Liberal	Morrison	Minister for Defence	30 March 2021	23 May 2022	1 year, 54 days
21	Tony Burke	Labor	Albanese	Minister for Employment and Workplace Relations; Minister for the Arts	1 June 2022	29 July 2024	4 years, 98 days
21	Tony Burke	Labor	Albanese	Minister for the Arts; Minister for Immigration and Multicultural Affairs; Minister for Home Affairs; Minister for Cyber Security	29 July 2024	13 May 2025	4 years, 98 days
21	Tony Burke	Labor	Albanese	Minister for the Arts; Minister for Immigration and Citizenship; Minister for Home Affairs; Minister for Cyber Security	13 May 2025	Incumbent	4 years, 98 days

Note: For terms during the period 1951 to 1972, exact dates are taken from changes in Prime Minister. Other dates coincide with sitting periods of the House as an approximation of when terms began and ended.

== Deputy Leaders of the House ==
The following individuals have been appointed as Deputy Leader of the Australian House of Representatives:

Order	Minister	Party	Prime Minister	Portfolio	Term start	Term end	Time in office
1	Peter McGauran	National	Howard	Minister for Science and Technology	11 March 1996	26 September 1997	1 year, 199 days
2	Warren Truss	National	Howard	Minister for Customs and Consumer Affairs	26 September 1997	21 October 1998	1 year, 25 days
(1)	Peter McGauran	National	Howard	Minister for the Arts and the Centenary of Federation	21 October 1998	26 November 2001	9 years, 43 days
(1)	Peter McGauran	National	Howard	Minister for Science	26 November 2001	26 October 2004	9 years, 43 days
(1)	Peter McGauran	National	Howard	Minister for Citizenship and Multicultural Affairs	26 October 2004	6 July 2005	9 years, 43 days
(1)	Peter McGauran	National	Howard	Minister for Agriculture, Fisheries and Forestry	6 July 2005	3 December 2007	9 years, 43 days
3	Stephen Smith	Labor	Rudd	Minister for Foreign Affairs	3 December 2007	24 June 2010	5 years, 245 days
3	Stephen Smith	Labor	Gillard	Minister for Foreign Affairs	24 June 2010	28 June 2010	5 years, 245 days
3	Stephen Smith	Labor	Gillard	Minister for Foreign Affairs; Minister for Trade	28 June 2010	14 September 2010	5 years, 245 days
3	Stephen Smith	Labor	Gillard	Minister for Defence	14 September 2010	27 June 2013	5 years, 245 days
3	Stephen Smith	Labor	Rudd	Minister for Defence	27 June 2013	5 August 2013	5 years, 245 days
4	Luke Hartsuyker	National	Abbott	Assistant Minister for Employment	18 September 2013	21 September 2015	2 years, 153 days
4	Luke Hartsuyker	National	Turnbull	Minister for Vocational Education and Skills	21 September 2015	18 February 2016	2 years, 153 days
5	Darren Chester	National	Turnbull	Minister for Infrastructure and Transport	18 February 2016	20 December 2017	1 year, 305 days
6	Michael McCormack	National	Turnbull	Minister for Veterans' Affairs; Minister for Defence Personnel	20 December 2017	5 March 2018	75 days
(5)	Darren Chester	National	Turnbull	Minister for Veterans' Affairs; Minister for Defence Personnel	5 March 2018	24 August 2018	3 years, 119 days
(5)	Darren Chester	National	Morrison	Minister for Veterans' Affairs; Minister for Defence Personnel	24 August 2018	2 July 2021	3 years, 119 days
7	David Gillespie	National	Morrison	Minister Assisting the Minister for Trade and Investment	2 July 2021	11 April 2022	283 days
8	Mark Butler	Labor	Albanese	Minister for Health and Aged Care	31 May 2022	13 May 2025	4 years, 99 days
8	Mark Butler	Labor	Albanese	Minister for Health and Ageing; Minister for Disability and the National Disability Insurance Scheme	13 May 2025	Incumbent	4 years, 99 days

== See also ==
- Leader of Government Business (disambiguation)
