= Department of Infrastructure, Transport, Regional Development, Communications, Sport and the Arts =

Australian government department

Department overview
- Formed: 1 July 2022
- Preceding Department: Department of Infrastructure, Transport, Regional Development and Communications
- Jurisdiction: Commonwealth of Australia
- Headquarters: Canberra, Australia
- Ministers responsible: Catherine King, Minister for Infrastructure, Transport, Regional Development and Local Government; Kristy McBain, Minister for Regional Development, Local Government and Territories; Anika Wells, Communications and Sport; Tony Burke, Arts; Madeleine King, Northern Australia
- Department executive: Jim Betts, Secretary
- Child agencies: Australian Communications and Media Authority; NBN Co Limited; Digital Transformation Agency; Australian Postal Corporation; Special Broadcasting Service Corporation
- Website: www.infrastructure.gov.au; www.bitre.gov.au

Logo used between 2022 and 2025

The Department of Infrastructure, Transport, Regional Development, Communications, Sport and the Arts (DITRDCSA) is a department of the Australian Government responsible for providing advice on, and delivering policies and programs for, infrastructure, transport, regional development, communications, cultural affairs, sports, and the arts.

== History ==
The Department of Infrastructure, Transport, Regional Development, Communications and the Arts (DITRDCA) was formed from the former Department of Infrastructure, Transport, Regional Development and Communications. It was established and named under an Administrative Arrangements Order made on 1 July 2022, after the 2022 Australian election, under the new Albanese government.

It was renamed to Department of Infrastructure, Transport, Regional Development, Communications, Sport and the Arts (DITRDCSA) on 13 May 2025, gaining the sport and recreation policy and functions from the Department of Health and Aged Care. However, land and planning policy and cities and urban policy were transferred to the Treasury.

== Description ==
The department is responsible for delivering Australian Government policy and programs for infrastructure, transport, regional development, communications, cultural affairs, and the arts.

=== Ministers ===
As of May 2025 the Ministers of State for the Department are:

- Minister for Infrastructure, Transport, Regional Development and Local Government: Catherine King
- Minister for Northern Australia: Madeleine King
- Minister for Communications: Anika Wells
- Minister for Sport: Anika Wells
- Minister for the Arts: Tony Burke
- Minister for Regional Development, Local Government and Territories: Kristy McBain
- Assistant Minister for Regional Development: Anthony Chisholm
- Assistant Minister for Northern Australia: Nita Green

=== Other staff ===
As of July 2025 Jim Betts is Secretary of the department.

== Operational activities ==
In an Administrative Arrangements Order made on 13 May 2025, the functions of the department were broadly classified into the following matters:

- Infrastructure planning and co-ordination
- Transport safety, including investigations
- Land transport
- Civil aviation and airports
- Maritime transport including shipping
- Major projects, including implementation of all non-Defence development projects
- Administration of the Jervis Bay Territory, the Territory of Cocos (Keeling) Islands, the Territory of Christmas Island, the Coral Sea Islands Territory, the Territory of Ashmore and Cartier Islands, and Norfolk Island
- Constitutional development of the Northern Territory
- Constitutional development of the Australian Capital Territory
- Delivery of regional and territory specific services and programmes
- Planning and land management in the Australian Capital Territory
- Regional development
- Matters relating to local government
- Regional policy and co-ordination
- Northern Australia policy and coordination
- Broadband policy and programmes
- Postal and telecommunications policies and programmes
- Spectrum policy management
- Broadcasting policy
- Content policy relating to the information economy
- Cultural affairs, including movable cultural heritage and support for the arts
- Classification
- Management of government records
- Old Parliament House
- Sport and recreation

== Significant policies ==
=== Cultural policy ===
The Office for the Arts issued the national cultural policy, called "Revive: a place for every story, a story for every place", in January 2023. Under the policy, which is set to run for five years, the Creative Futures Fund was set up under the auspices of Creative Australia in July 2025 to fund ambitious cross-sector projects across the nation. A quota was introduced in November 2025, by Minister for the Arts Tony Burke, requiring global streaming media companies with over a million Australian subscribers to spend either 7.5% of revenues, or 10% of Australian expenditures on local original content.

=== Australian Screen Production Incentive (ASPI) ===
Australian Screen Production Incentive (ASPI), provided by the Australian Government to support the Australian film industry since 2007, comprises three mutually exclusive components:

- Producer offset, a 40% tax rebate on the qualifying spend of qualifying Australian films, and a 30% rebate for other qualifying productions that contain significant Australian content
- PDV (post, digital, and visual effects) offset, a 30% rebate on the qualifying Australian expenditure related to PDV production (including productions shot overseas)
- Location offset, on the qualifying Australian spend of large-scale productions

The PDV and Location offsets are administered by the Department of Infrastructure, Transport, Regional Development, Communications and the Arts. The Minister for the Arts is responsible for issuing a final certificate for a film in relation to the PDV tax offset.

== See also ==
- Australian Communications and Media Authority
- Infrastructure Australia
- Minister for the Arts (Australia)
