= Angus Taylor =

Australian politician (born 1966)

The Honourable Angus Taylor MP
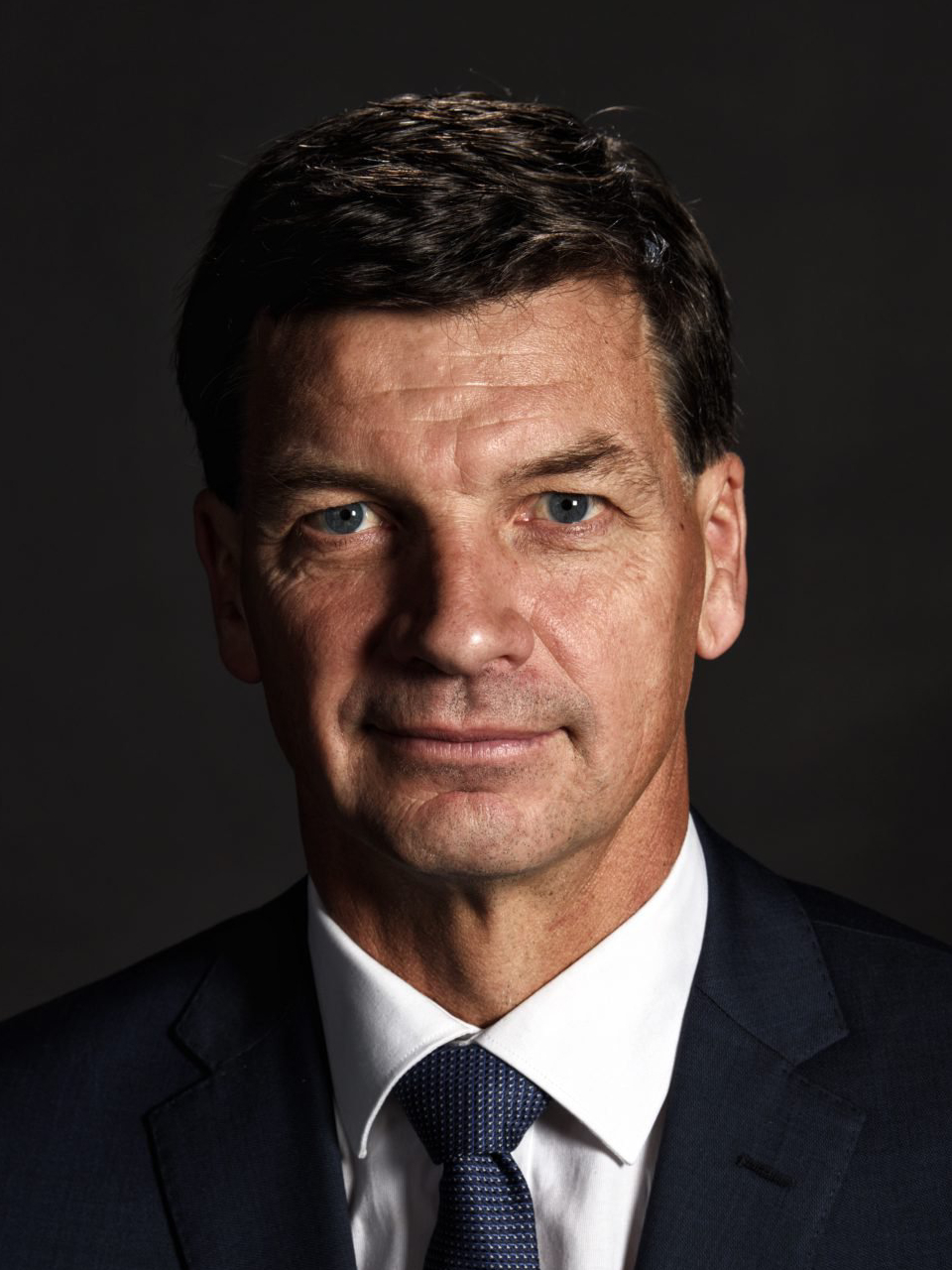
- Official portrait, 2018

Leader of the Opposition
- Incumbent
- Assumed office 13 February 2026
- Prime Minister: Anthony Albanese
- Deputy: Jane Hume and Andrew Hastie (Note: The position of "Deputy Leader in the House of Representatives" is held by Hastie. As Hume is a member of the Senate, it was necessary to elect a House-only deputy for procedural reasons.)
- Preceded by: Sussan Ley

17th Leader of the Liberal Party
- Incumbent
- Assumed office 13 February 2026
- Deputy: Jane Hume
- Preceded by: Sussan Ley
Shadow ministerial offices
Shadow Minister for Veterans Affairs
Acting; 30 January 2026 – 11 February 2026
Leader	Sussan Ley
Preceded by	Darren Chester
Succeeded by	Michael McCormack
Shadow Minister for Defence
In office 28 May 2025 – 11 February 2026
Leader	Sussan Ley
Preceded by	Andrew Hastie
Succeeded by	James Paterson
Shadow Treasurer
In office 5 June 2022 – 28 May 2025
Leader	Peter Dutton
Preceded by	Jim Chalmers
Succeeded by	Ted O'Brien
Ministerial offices
Minister for Industry, Energy and Emissions Reduction Energy and Emissions Reduction (2018-21)
In office 28 August 2018 – 23 May 2022
Prime Minister	Scott Morrison
Preceded by	Josh Frydenberg (as Minister for the Environment and Energy)
Succeeded by	Chris Bowen (as Minister for Climate Change and Energy); Ed Husic (as Minister for Industry and Science)
Minister for Law Enforcement and Cybersecurity
In office 20 December 2017 – 23 August 2018
Prime Minister	Malcolm Turnbull
Minister	Peter Dutton; Scott Morrison (Acting)
Preceded by	Office established
Succeeded by	Office abolished
Assistant Minister for Cities and Digital Transformation
In office 18 February 2016 – 20 December 2017
Prime Minister	Malcolm Turnbull
Preceded by	Office established
Succeeded by	Michael Keenan

Member of the Australian Parliament for Hume
- Incumbent
- Assumed office 7 September 2013
- Preceded by: Alby Schultz

Personal details
- Born: Angus James Taylor; 30 September 1966 (age 60) Cooma, New South Wales, Australia
- Party: Liberal
- Other political affiliations: Coalition
- Spouse: Louise Clegg
- Children: 4
- Education: University of Sydney (BEcon, LLB); New College, Oxford (MPhil)
- Occupation: Politician
- Website: Official website Party website

Angus James Taylor (born 30 September 1966) is an Australian politician who has served as the leader of the Opposition since 2026. He has held office as the leader of the Liberal Party, and has been the member of Parliament (MP) for the New South Wales division of Hume since 2013. He served as a minister in the Turnbull and Morrison governments.

Born in Cooma, Taylor was raised in rural New South Wales. He graduated from the University of Sydney and New College, Oxford, attending the latter as a Rhodes Scholar. Prior to entering politics, he worked as a management consultant and in agribusiness. Taylor was elected to the House of Representatives at the 2013 federal election, becoming an assistant minister in the Turnbull government in 2015, and Minister for Law Enforcement and Cybersecurity in 2017. He held office as Minister for Energy, Energy and Emissions Reduction, and Minister for Industry, Energy and Emissions Reduction in the Morrison government.

Following Peter Dutton's defeat at the 2025 election, he contested the subsequent leadership election, losing to Sussan Ley. Taylor, a prominent member of the National Right party faction, resigned from Ley's shadow cabinet in 2026 amid historically low polling for the Liberal Party. He successfully challenged Ley in a subsequent leadership spill, becoming the leader of the Liberal Party and the leader of the Opposition.

== Early life and education ==
Taylor was born on 30 September 1966 in Cooma, New South Wales, to Anne and Peter Taylor. He was raised alongside his three brothers on their family property "Bobingah", a sheep and cattle farm in Nimmitabel. He is partly of Jewish descent, with a Jewish grandmother.

Taylor's father is a fourth-generation sheep farmer. Taylor's maternal grandfather was engineer Sir William Hudson. His mother died from cancer in 1988 at the age of 48. Contemporaneous to her death was a collapse in wool and beef prices due to drought, an event that brought financial stress on the Taylor family. His father eventually became President of NSW Farmers and Vice President of the National Farmers Federation.

Taylor completed primary school at Nimmitabel's local primary school. He then boarded at The King's School, Parramatta. Upon graduation, he studied at the University of Sydney while residing at St Andrew's College, graduating with a Bachelor of Economics and a Bachelor of Laws.

Taylor then won a Rhodes Scholarship, and elected to study a Master of Philosophy in Economics at New College, Oxford. He studied "Smith, Bentham, Burke, Mill, Marshall, Schumpeter, Galbraith, Keynes and Friedman". During his studies he developed an interest in the game theory of John Forbes Nash Jr. He applied Nash's theories to make an analysis of English pubs, to argue that they ought be protected from being dominated by large brewing companies. While at Oxford in 1991, Taylor also met future Prime Minister of Canada Mark Carney, who was also studying at Oxford and both had attended an economics post-graduate course together.

== Early career ==
Taylor had a career in management consulting and then helped launch a number of agribusinesses with his brothers and other business partners, including Growth Farms.

Taylor joined his brother Charlie at McKinsey & Co, a global management consulting firm, in 1994. Projects took him to Korea, the US, and the UK and to New Zealand, where he worked with dairy farmers to create a new business model. Taylor returned to Sydney and was made a partner in 1999.

Around this time, Taylor developed a digital agribusiness called Farmshed. He convinced his employer, McKinsey, to back the project along with Wesfarmers, Rural Press and, later, JB Were and NAB. Based in Surry Hills, Taylor was the MD. However, when Wesfarmers merged with IAMA, they began to see Farmshed as undercutting their own business. The online business failed, with a loss of several million dollars.

Taylor went on to become a director at Port Jackson Partners, an Australian management consulting firm. During this tenure, he was a member of the Victorian government taskforce to investigate the development of a coal seam gas industry in the state. Reporting in November 2013, the taskforce recommended that the State of Victoria should promote the production of additional and largely on-shore gas supply. He also worked as the director of Rabobank's Executive Development Program for leading farmers in Australia and New Zealand, as well as their Farm Managers Program which focused on younger farmers.

=== Agribusiness startups ===
After leaving Port Jackson Partners, Taylor developed several businesses with family members and fellow investors, largely connected to irrigation and agriculture. Some of these businesses were relinquished on his taking his seat in parliament, while others continue, wholly or partly owned by the holding company of Taylor's family Gufee Pty Ltd, a family trust.

Eastern Australia Irrigation (EAI) was co-founded by Taylor and he was a director from 2007 to 2012. In mid 2008, he was also a director and secretary of its parent company, Eastern Australia Agriculture (EAA). By the end of 2009 he had ended his relationship with the company. In 2019, Taylor's earlier dealings with the company were given media attention as EAA had sold water licences from two of its agricultural properties back to the Australian government in 2017 for $79 million— a profit to the company of $52 million. At the time, Taylor reiterated that he was not connected to the company at the time of the water licence transaction, had not been since 2009 and had not received any financial benefit from the water purchase.

Farm Partnerships Australia was a farm-leasing business venture owned by Gufee. By 2015 it was managing 35 properties in Victoria, NSW, and Queensland, with a total of 109,000 hectares of land under management.

Growth Farms is an agribusiness formed by Taylor with his oldest brother, Richard in 1999, holding a non-controlling stake through Gufee until it sold its interest in early 2020. At first the company focussed on leveraged-leaseholds of high-rainfall properties in the Southern Tablelands and Monaro. The approach caused serious financing issues as "the cost of it doubled market-wise". The company then shifted to consulting. It enjoyed early expansion when it won Sir Michael Hintze as a client, managing his 12 properties across Australia. The company manages the Queensland properties Clyde and Kia Ora as well as the Kerry Stokes-owned Cygnet Park on Kangaroo Island. The group owns "Hyland Grange", "Bellevue" and the old Taylor family property "Bobingah" all in the South East of NSW. One of the farms managed by the group is at Corrowong near Delegate. Operations at this property came under the scrutiny of environmental agencies when managers used a herbicide that was later seen to be a threat to an endangered species of native grass. The investigation by NSW Environment & Heritage concluded in April 2017, finding there was no case to answer. The Federal Department of Agriculture, Water and the Environment began its own investigation and Taylor met with officers from the Department of Environment. This was seen as "a potential breach of the ministerial code of conduct", generating intense media scrutiny, particularly in The Guardian and came to dominate Question Time in Parliament by late 2019. Taylor was unrepentant, saying, "If I'm not standing up for farmers in the federal parliament, then who is?"

Jam Land is a holding company also part owned by Gufee Pty Ltd. Taylor's brother and business partner, Richard, is one of the three owners.

JRAT International was a company set up for consulting projects in the early 2000s. The company appears to never have begun business operations. Taylor admitted in 2020 that while the company should have appeared on his register of parliamentary interests "the company did no business, and earned no income, and I received absolutely no benefit from it".

== Political career ==
Angus Taylor results in Hume	2013	2016	2019	2022	2025
1st preference %	53.97	53.83	50.30	43.12	43.85
2-party-preferred %	61.47	60.18	62.99	57.72	58.06

Taylor first showed an interest in politics when he returned from Oxford, joining the Liberal Party when he was 26. He volunteered as a staffer for Barry O'Farrell, then a member of NSW state parliament. O'Farrell encouraged him to "have a career before politics" and Taylor moved to consulting. About twenty years later, he met John Howard at a Heart Foundation fundraiser where the Prime Minister strongly encouraged Taylor to run for Parliament. Learning that Alby Schultz, the Member for Hume was considering retirement, in 2011 Taylor moved his family from Woollahra to the Southern Tablelands, on a farm outside of Goulburn, enrolling his children in local schools.

Schultz announced in April 2012 that he would not re-contest the seat of Hume at the 2013 federal election, and Taylor sought and gained Liberal endorsement for the seat of Hume, 26 votes out of 33. One of the candidates he defeated, Rick Mandelson, later appeared to endorse Taylor, saying "more common sense (is needed) in the Parliament along with someone who's actually done some things, not just academics, lawyers and union reps."

Taylor's wife, Louise Clegg, stepped back from her career as a barrister and law lecturer to run Taylor's election campaign "with military precision and solid financial support". Records show he made donations to his own campaign during 2012–2013. Under Coalition rules, the Nationals were also entitled to run a candidate against Taylor, but decided not to. Taylor was elected as Member for Hume with over 61% of the two-party preferred vote and over 54% of the primary vote. Taylor joined the Government benches under new Prime Minister Tony Abbott. In an interview early in his parliamentary career he said, "I hate, I mean really hate, fart-arsing around. I insist on getting things done. And yet that is what government specialises in. It specialises in fart-arsing. In stopping anything from happening, or insisting that the longest route is taken. I do delivery."

Soon into his role as a backbencher, Taylor called for an overhaul to the Renewable energy target, which the Liberal Party had supported up to that point. He wrote and circulated a paper outlining how many renewable energy projects, in particular wind are increasing electricity costs, and proposed cheaper carbon reduction methods. He was particularly supportive of turning to natural gas as "a better way to reduce carbon emissions". At points he has used inflammatory language against supporters of windpower, describing them as "the new climate religion". As a speaker at the "Wind Power Fraud Rally" Taylor both criticised windpower while accepting the need to reduce emissions:

I am not a climate sceptic. For 25 years, I have been concerned about how rising carbon dioxide emissions might have an impact on our climate. It remains a concern of mine today. I do not have a vendetta against renewables. My grandfather was William Hudson – he was the first Commissioner and Chief Engineer of the Snowy Scheme, Australia's greatest ever renewable scheme. He believed in renewables and renewables have been in my blood since the day I was born.

=== Early parliamentary roles ===
Taylor began working on parliamentary committees on employment, trade and investment growth and public accounts. In these forums, he argued against increasing government debt, saying that Australia's long-term prosperity is characterised by high real wages and low inequality, and that only by increasing productivity and participation, will Australia's broad-based prosperity continue. Taylor was not given any portfolio by Abbott during this Parliament. The Australian Financial Review said that he had been "left to languish" which, The Guardian speculated, was because other MPs "had deeper political networks".

Mobile-phone black spots were a prominent concern for people in the Southern Tablelands and Taylor said he was "determined to fix this". By 2015, funding had been secured for new towers in Wollondilly, one of 18 new towers for the region funded under round 1 of a federal program.

=== Turnbull government (2015–2018) ===
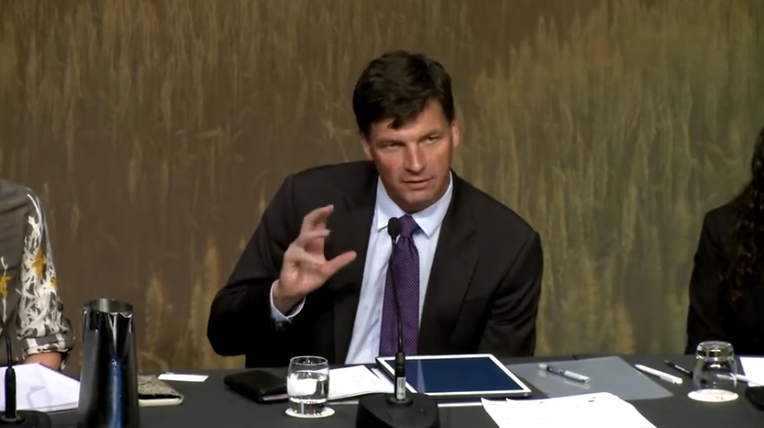
Angus Taylor speaking on digital Innovation in agriculture in March 2017

In September 2015, Abbott was replaced by Malcolm Turnbull as prime minister, and Taylor was sworn in as the Assistant Minister for Cities and Digital Transformation following a rearrangement in the First Turnbull Ministry in February 2016. Taylor was "instrumental in ensuring that a single digital profile would be adopted for clients of the federal agencies, rather than letting departments run off in all directions". By May 2017, usage of myGov had doubled in two years.

At the 2016 federal election, the Turnbull government was returned to power with a severely reduced majority. Taylor faced a pre-selection threat, from Russell Matheson, which was averted. His seat was also redistributed, making it less regional and more urban, which was thought to favour the Labor Party. He retained his seat with 60.18% of the two party preferred vote.

Shortly after the election, Taylor was brought to the front bench as Minister for Law Enforcement and Cybersecurity. In this role, he appointed the first Commonwealth Transnational Serious and Organised Crime Coordinator. This innovation has been seen by the Australian Strategic Policy Institute as providing "a mechanism to lead and strengthen national disruption efforts" against organised crime. It was also expected to lead to arrests for human trafficking and child pornography.

Taylor was sworn in as Minister for Energy on 28 August 2018. In interviews, he emphasised that his focus would be on "price, price, price" rather than renewable energy. While reluctant to say the Turnbull-era National Energy Guarantee was "dead", it became clear that the only part of the policy which would remain would be its "focus on reliability". He began receiving criticism for his performance in his portfolio, with the ABC querying a "rejected a billion-dollar plan to help struggling households pay their power bills" and, more seriously, that his claims that Australia would still meet its commitments to the Paris Agreement were "not what the figures show". Senator Penny Wong, the Labor leader in the Senate said, "I don't think there's been a climate minister, energy minister who's been more anti-renewable than Angus Taylor."

=== Morrison government (2018–2022) ===
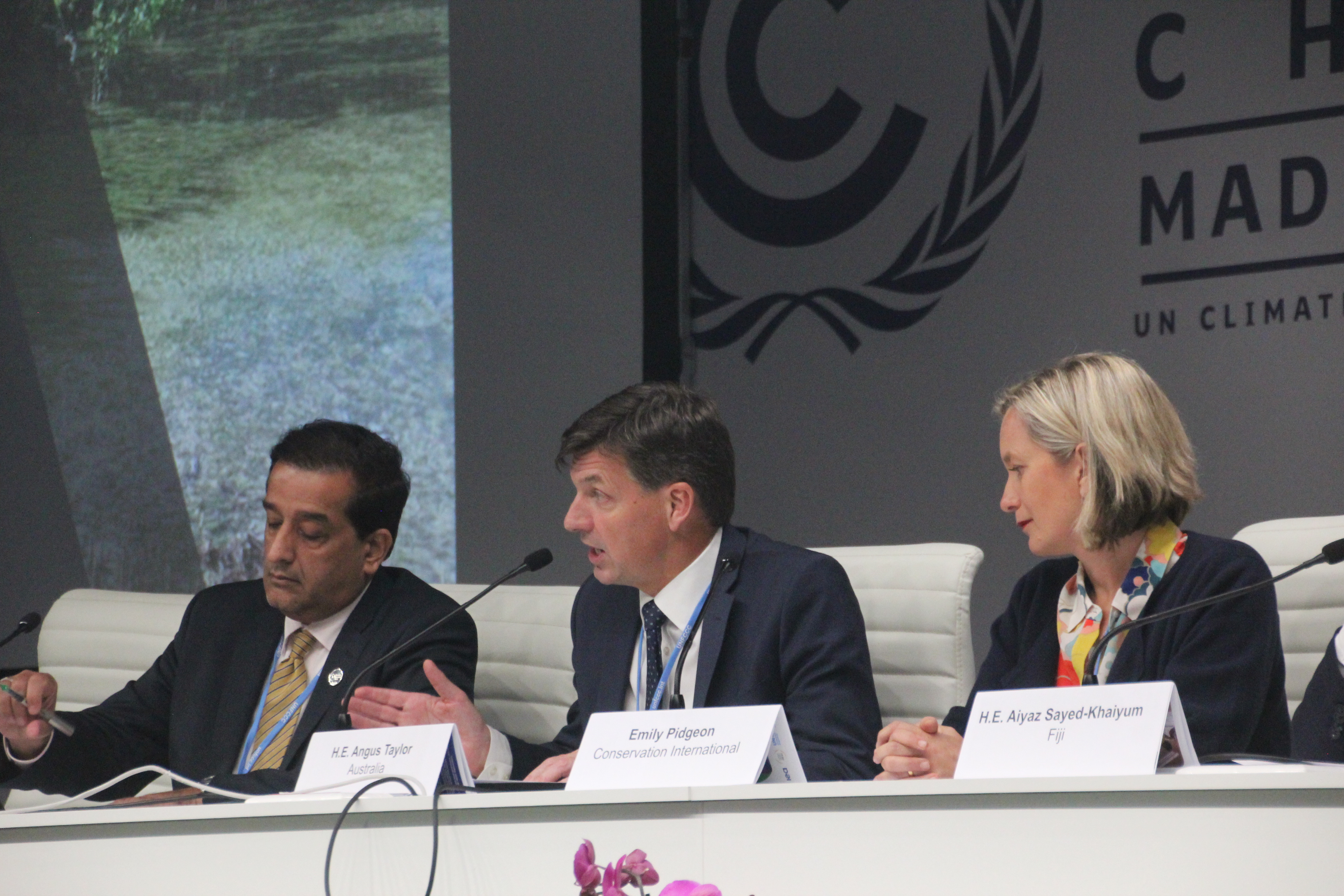
Angus Taylor speaking at the COP25 Blue Carbon Initiative in December 2019

Following the 21 August 2018 leadership spill which challenged Malcolm Turnbull for leadership of the Liberal Party, Taylor was one of several frontbenchers to announce his resignation. Taylor wrote in a letter to Turnbull that he was resigning due to his support for Peter Dutton: "I have previously relayed to you my concerns about the direction of this Government, and my views on the policies that should characterise a traditional centre-right Liberal Party." After a second spill later in the week, Turnbull resigned as Prime Minister, with Scott Morrison elected as leader. Taylor was subsequently appointed as Minister for Energy, characterised by Morrison as "Minister for reducing electricity prices". His appointment prompted strong criticism from renewable energy advocates.

In the run up to the 2019 federal election, Taylor was accused of scandal by progressives on Twitter and was targeted in the electorate by GetUp! Against pressure to move to a 45% renewable energy target, Taylor put emphasis on reducing the cost of energy with two announcements. First of a default market offer price, which would limit the price that retailers can charge residential and small businesses. and a wholesale price target "at less than $70 a megawatt-hour by the end of 2021". Taylor said a 4000-megawatt portfolio of power projects underwritten by the government would "put the big energy companies on notice" if they did not achieve these price targets. Locally, Taylor campaigned on his record of low unemployment, growth of 1,040 new businesses and infrastructure investments. Taylor increased his two-party-preferred margin from 10.18 to 12.99 points. The Morrison government was returned with a stronger majority and Taylor was invited to join the second Morrison ministry.

Taylor was sworn in as Minister for Energy and Emissions Reduction on 29 May 2019. Criticism for his performance continued and in October 2019, Taylor was said to be repeating misleading claims about the previous Labor government's poor record on carbon emissions. As minister, Taylor threatened the introduction of "big stick" laws which would force the break up of energy companies if they did not reduce their energy prices. Analysts began projecting that wholesale energy prices would drop and that 50% of energy would come from renewable sources by 2030, though they would not credit government policy for this. The legislation was later called "extreme and arbitrary" by the energy industry.

During the COVID-19 recession, Taylor announced the establishment of a National Oil Reserve. This would involve an AUD$94m purchase of oil, reserved for Australia, but stored in the United States. The move went directly against the advice of Australian Institute of Petroleum who argued that "the crude oil market is a global market and it is well supplied". While supported by conservative Liberal Party backbenchers such as Andrew Hastie, the move was ridiculed by Labor leader Anthony Albanese, with the decision to locate the storage in the US as being, "rather bizarre". The move was characterised as a "downpayment" on doing "something more permanent in Australia" which as a result of closures since the 1990s has only four refineries.

=== Parliamentary controversies ===
Beginning in 2019, a number of stories about Taylor were published that caused controversy regarding him as a minister. Journalist Anne Davies stated that the stories were "all uncovered by The Guardian", though these stories were subsequently re-reported by other media outlets. By September 2019, Labor opposition leaders began insisting he should "step down", "should resign or be sacked" and "should have stepped down a long time ago". By the end of 2019 Davies described Taylor as going "from the Liberals' golden boy to a man on the edge". Sky News suggested that any talk of resignation was premature.

==== Watergate ====
Taylor was accused of using $80 million of taxpayers' money to buy water licences from two Queensland properties owned by Eastern Australia Agriculture (EAA). Taylor was a director of EAA, though he resigned from his position in November 2009. The Guardian and Greens Senator Sarah Hanson-Young began circulating reporting on this as #watergate. The Twitter campaign was "driven by several activists who support independent political candidates challenging Liberal MPs, including former prime minister Malcolm Turnbull's son, Alex Turnbull, mining heir Simon Holmes à Court, and former Sydney Morning Herald journalist Margo Kingston." The law firm Ashurst LLP was asked to prepare an opinion on the matter. They found that Taylor had never had equity in EAA or any associated company or had any benefit for the sale of any water or land.

==== Grasslands clash ====
In July 2019, activists launched the #Grassgate hashtag on Twitter and accused Taylor of misleading parliament on "An investigation into illegal land clearing against a company part-owned by the family of federal minister Angus Taylor." When questioned concerning his involvement in herbicide use and his subsequent meeting with officials, Taylor informed parliament that he was discussing "long and detailed concerns" on native grass legislation with a farmer in Yass on 21 February 2017, whereas parliamentary records instead show that Taylor was in Sydney participating in a High Value Data Roundtable discussion. Environment minister Josh Frydenberg sought urgent information about an investigation by his department against a company in which Taylor and his relatives held an interest. Jam Land, part owned by Taylor and his family, was under investigation for alleged illegal clearing of grasslands at the time. About 30 hectares of the critically endangered grassland known as the natural temperate grassland of the south eastern highlands had been allegedly poisoned at a property in Delegate, New South Wales, in late 2016. Frydenberg canvassed whether protections for a critically endangered grassland at the centre of the compliance action could be watered down and if it could be kept secret.

==== Forged document controversy ====
In October 2019, Taylor was accused of having forged a City of Sydney Council document and providing that document to The Daily Telegraph. The incident stemmed from a letter the Lord Mayor of Sydney, Clover Moore wrote to the Minister, asking him to declare "a climate emergency". In his reply, Taylor criticised her own department's travel – claiming that the City of Sydney Council spent $15.9 million on travel for the 2017–18 period, which he attributed to an annual report document available on the council's website. Moore responded publicly, saying the figures had been altered as the actual annual report showed they had spent less than $6,000 in travel expenses, and that no report with the figures given by Taylor had ever existed.

It was later revealed through freedom of information that Taylor had been informed almost immediately after he reported the figures on 30 September that they were incorrect, though did nothing to correct the mistake until 22 October 2019, when he apologised to Moore for the incorrect figures. Taylor and his representatives, however, continued to insist the document was obtained from the Council website, despite evidence to the contrary from archived versions of it on Trove. Metadata showed the version of the document on the website has been unchanged since November 2018. Further, data from the website shows there were no downloads of the document during the time period Taylor's office alleged they had accessed the version with the incorrect figures. The matter was referred to NSW Police for investigation by the Australian Labor Party. On 26 November 2019, NSW Police announced that they had commenced an investigation.

Despite calls from the opposition for Taylor to be stood down during the investigation, Prime Minister Scott Morrison stated there was "no action required" on his behalf. During the NSW Police investigation, Morrison made a phone call to NSW Police Commissioner Mick Fuller, with whom he had a prior relationship as neighbours. Both men refused to give details or recordings of the call, although Fuller did say that Morrison did not ask any inappropriate questions, and was only given information that was already in the media release. Former anti-corruption judge David Ipp said the call appeared to be an attempt by Morrison to influence the investigation. On 1 January 2020, the investigation was referred to the Australian Federal Police (AFP). On 6 February 2020, the AFP announced that they would not continue to pursue an investigation into the origin of the document as it was determined there was no evidence to be found. Moore lodged a formal complaint with the Australian Press Council over The Daily Telegraph article.

==== "Well done Angus" ====
Taylor made headlines during the 2019 election campaign when, on 1 May, he posted an article regarding a commitment to building car parks in a neighbouring electorate held by the Labor Party, then there appeared a comment from Taylor saying, "Fantastic. Great move. Well done Angus." He was mocked on social media for the act, and it was suggested Taylor or one of his staff were deliberately making positive remarks using false accounts. His comment resurfaced in 2026 when he challenged the Liberal leadership, with many social media users commenting it on Taylor's social media posts.

==== Naomi Wolf conflict ====
In his 2013 maiden parliamentary speech, Taylor stated he first encountered "political correctness" in 1991 at Oxford University when "a young Naomi Wolf lived a couple of doors down the corridor. Several graduate students ... decided we should abandon the Christmas tree in the common room because some people might be offended." Taylor went on to say democratic rights were being "chipped away by shrill elitist voices". In 2019, after part of the speech was shared online, Wolf noted Taylor's recollection of her was not possible as she left Oxford in 1988, and rejected any implication she opposed Christmas trees as she "loves Christmas". She described his reference to "elites" as "antisemitic dogwhistling". A spokesman for Taylor said he never stated Wolf was one of the graduates against the Christmas tree. Taylor denied any form of antisemitism and demanded an apology from her over the claim, stating the accusation was offensive as he had a Jewish grandparent.

==== Electricity price rise delay ====
Before the 2022 election, Taylor reportedly ordered the Australian Energy Regulator to delay their announcement of the Default Market Offer by several weeks. The announcement indicated that benchmark electricity prices would rise up to 18.3%. Incoming energy minister Chris Bowen accused Taylor of having ordered the delay to increase the Coalition's chances at the election.

==== Opposition to the Voice ====
Taylor and fellow Liberal MP Andrew Hastie caused controversy after misquoting former High Court Justices Robert French and Kenneth Hayne regarding the 2023 Australian Indigenous Voice referendum.

=== Shadow cabinet (2022–2026) ===
Following the Coalition's defeat at the 2022 election, he was appointed as shadow treasurer in the shadow ministry of Peter Dutton. Taylor was re-elected at the 2025 election, and, following Dutton's defeat in his own seat, contested the Liberal leadership election, losing to Deputy Leader Sussan Ley.

On 28 May 2025, after his leadership election loss, Taylor was appointed to the position of shadow minister for defence in Ley's shadow ministry. On the evening of 11 February 2026, he resigned from the shadow ministry amidst rising speculation of a leadership spill from him against Ley. Taylor formally announced his candidacy for leader of the Liberal Party on the morning of 12 February, with a spill motion being launched on that day. He defeated Ley at the subsequent leadership spill, winning 34 votes to Ley's 17. Senator for Victoria Jane Hume was concurrently elected as deputy leader, replacing Ted O'Brien.

== Leader of the Opposition (2026–present) ==
Upon being elected as the leader of the Liberal Party and the leader of the Opposition, Taylor announced the issue of immigration being his top priority. His election was to the dismay of notable Moderates, with former Prime Minister Malcolm Turnbull saying that people regarded him as "the best qualified idiot they've ever met".

During his first speech as party leader and leader of the Opposition at a press conference, Taylor announced a revised Liberal Party policy, calling for lower immigration and an immigration policy that "puts the interests of Australians first, and puts Australians values at the centre of that policy", stating Australia should deny access of immigrants from high risk regions who bring violence and hate. He also targeted "net-zero ideology" and the Albanese government's "bad carbon taxes", and voiced support for lower inflation, interest rates, and taxes.

Taylor formally announced his shadow ministry on 17 February, having largely demoted factional enemies from the Moderate and Centre Right factions of the Liberal Party, and promoted prominent allies from the National Right faction. Key demotions included Alex Hawke and Andrew Wallace; promotions to the shadow cabinet included Andrew Hastie, Jacinta Nampijinpa Price, Tim Wilson, Claire Chandler, Sarah Henderson, and Phillip Thompson. Andrew Hastie was additionally appointed deputy leader of the Opposition and deputy leader of the Liberal Party exclusively in the House of Representatives; a procedural action taken as a result of Deputy Leader Jane Hume's status as a senator.

== Publications ==
Taylor has published reports as part of the ANZ Bank Insight series. The first of these, Earth, Fire, Wind and Water – Economic Opportunity and the Australian Commodities Cycle, focused on the opportunities and challenges faced by Australia's commodity exporters in the face of the commodities boom, and was described as a "landmark report" by The Australian. The second was Greener Pastures – The Soft Commodity Opportunity for Australia and New Zealand, arguing that a soft commodity boom was taking over from the hard commodity boom. Other reports and articles include The Future for Freight, focused on reform in the freight transport sector, and "More to Nation Building than Big Bucks", critiquing the Labor Government's comparison between its National Broadband Network and the Snowy Mountain Scheme.

In February 2013, Taylor authored the report, "A proposal to reduce the cost of electricity to Australian electricity users" while a director at Port Jackson Partners. The report said that the Coalition could immediately drop the renewable energy target entirely and save up to A$3.2 billion by 2020 and still meet emissions reduction targets.

Taylor was a member of a taskforce asked by the Victorian Government to investigate the development of a coal seam gas industry in the state. Reporting in November 2013, the report found that Victoria should promote the production of additional and largely on-shore gas supply. The taskforce was headed by former federal Liberal minister Peter Reith with other members representing energy companies, associated industries and lobby groups.

== Personal life ==
Taylor is an amateur triathlete; he competed in the 2009 ITU Triathlon Age Group World Championship on the Gold Coast representing Australia, placing 36th.

He resides near Goulburn on a farm with his wife, Sydney barrister Louise Clegg and their four children.

== Notes ==
Parliament of Australia
Preceded by Alby Schultz	Member for Hume; 2013–present	Incumbent
Political offices
New ministerial post	Assistant Minister for Cities and Digital Transformation; 2016–2017	Succeeded by Paul Fletcher as Minister for Urban Infrastructure and Cities
New ministerial post	Assistant Minister for Cities and Digital Transformation; 2016–2017	Succeeded by Michael Keenan as Minister Assisting the Prime Minister for Digital Transformation
New ministerial post	Minister for Law Enforcement and Cybersecurity; 2017–2018	Succeeded by Peter Dutton as Minister for Home Affairs
Preceded by Josh Frydenberg as Minister for the Environment and Energy	Minister for Energy; 2018–2019	Succeeded by Himself as Minister for Energy and Emissions Reduction
Preceded by Himself as Minister for Energy	Minister for Energy and Emissions Reduction; 2019–2021	Succeeded by Himself as Minister for Industry, Energy and Emissions Reduction
Preceded by Christian Porter as Minister for Industry, Science and Technology	Minister for Industry, Energy and Emissions Reduction; 2021–2022	Succeeded by Ed Husic as Minister for Industry and Science
Preceded by Himself as Minister for Energy and Emissions Reduction	Minister for Industry, Energy and Emissions Reduction; 2021–2022	Succeeded by Chris Bowen as Minister for Climate Change and Energy
Preceded by Jim Chalmers	Shadow Treasurer of Australia; 2022–2025	Succeeded by Ted O'Brien
Preceded by Andrew Hastie	Shadow Minister for Defence; 2025–2026	Succeeded by James Paterson
Preceded by Sussan Ley	Leader of the Opposition of Australia; 2026–present	Incumbent
Party political offices
Preceded by Sussan Ley	Leader of the Liberal Party of Australia; 2026–present	Incumbent
