= Tony Burke =

Australian politician (born 1969)

The Honourable Tony Burke MP
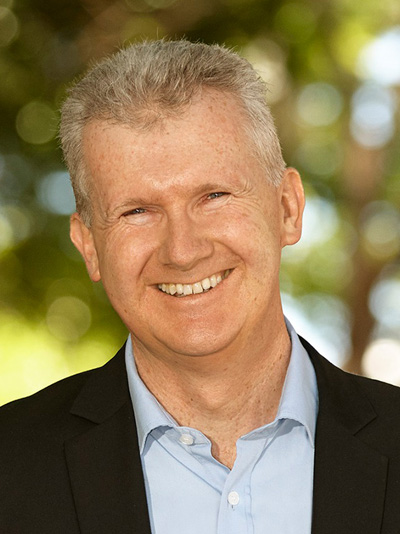
- Official portrait, 2022

Minister for Immigration and Citizenship
- Incumbent
- Assumed office 13 May 2025
- Prime Minister: Anthony Albanese
- Preceded by: Himself (Note: As Minister for Immigration and Multicultural Affairs)

Minister for Cyber Security
- Incumbent
- Assumed office 29 July 2024
- Prime Minister: Anthony Albanese
- Preceded by: Clare O'Neil

Minister for Home Affairs
- Incumbent
- Assumed office 29 July 2024
- Prime Minister: Anthony Albanese
- Preceded by: Clare O'Neil

Minister for the Arts
- Incumbent
- Assumed office 1 June 2022
- Prime Minister: Anthony Albanese
- Preceded by: Paul Fletcher

Leader of the House
- Incumbent
- Assumed office 31 May 2022
- Prime Minister: Anthony Albanese
- Deputy: Mark Butler
- Preceded by: Peter Dutton
Previous offices 2007–2025
Minister for Immigration and Multicultural Affairs
In office 29 July 2024 – 13 May 2025
Prime Minister	Anthony Albanese
Preceded by	Andrew Giles
Succeeded by	Himself (Note: As Minister for Immigration and Citizenship); Anne Aly (Note: As Minister for Multicultural Affairs)
Minister for Employment and Workplace Relations
In office 1 June 2022 – 29 July 2024
Prime Minister	Anthony Albanese
Preceded by	Richard Marles
Succeeded by	Murray Watt
Manager of Opposition Business
In office 18 October 2013 – 23 May 2022
Leader	Bill Shorten; Anthony Albanese
Preceded by	Christopher Pyne
Succeeded by	Paul Fletcher
Minister for Immigration, Multicultural Affairs and Citizenship
In office 1 July 2013 – 18 September 2013
Prime Minister	Kevin Rudd
Preceded by	Brendan O'Connor
Succeeded by	Scott Morrison
Vice-President of the Executive Council
In office 5 March 2012 – 18 September 2013
Prime Minister	Julia Gillard; Kevin Rudd
Preceded by	Robert McClelland
Succeeded by	George Brandis
Minister for Sustainability, Environment, Water, Population and Communities
In office 14 September 2010 – 1 July 2013
Prime Minister	Julia Gillard; Kevin Rudd
Preceded by	Peter Garrett (Note: As Minister for Environment Protection, Heritage and the Arts); Penny Wong (Note: As Minister for Climate Change, Energy Efficiency and Water)
Succeeded by	Mark Butler
Minister for Agriculture, Fisheries and Forestry
In office 3 December 2007 – 14 September 2010
Prime Minister	Kevin Rudd; Julia Gillard
Preceded by	Peter McGauran
Succeeded by	Joe Ludwig

Member of the Australian Parliament for Watson
- Incumbent
- Assumed office 9 October 2004
- Preceded by: Leo McLeay

Member of the New South Wales Legislative Council
- In office 22 March 2003 – 24 June 2004
- Succeeded by: Eric Roozendaal

Personal details
- Born: Anthony Stephen Burke; 4 November 1969 (age 57) Sydney, New South Wales, Australia
- Party: Labor
- Children: 3
- Education: St Patrick's College
- Alma mater: University of Sydney, (LLB), (BA)
- Website: www.tonyburke.com.au

Anthony Stephen Burke (born 4 November 1969) is an Australian politician serving as Minister for Home Affairs, Immigration and Citizenship, Cyber Security and the Arts. A member of the Labor Party, he has been the member of Parliament (MP) for the New South Wales division of Watson since 2004. He previously held cabinet positions in the governments of Kevin Rudd and Julia Gillard from 2007 to 2013.

Burke is a graduate of the University of Sydney, and worked as a political staffer, company director, and union organiser before entering politics. He was elected to the New South Wales Legislative Council in 2003, but resigned the following year to enter federal politics. He was included in the shadow ministry immediately after winning a seat at the 2004 election. During the first Rudd government, Burke held the position of Minister for Agriculture, Fisheries and Forestry, before being given the role of Minister for Sustainability, Environment, Water and Population in the Gillard government, after Gillard replaced Rudd as prime minister. In June 2013, Rudd would in turn replace Gillard as prime minister, and appointed Burke as the Minister for the Arts and Minister for Immigration, Multicultural Affairs and Citizenship in his subsequent government. He held these positions for less than three months, as Labor was defeated in the 2013 federal election.

In opposition, Burke served as the Manager of Opposition Business under Bill Shorten and Anthony Albanese, and held various positions in the shadow cabinet. After Labor's victory in the 2022 election, Burke would become Leader of the House, Minister for Employment and Workplace Relations and Minister for the Arts in the Albanese government.

== Early life ==
Burke was raised in a Catholic family of Irish descent. He attended Catholic schools, Regina Coeli (Beverly Hills, NSW) and St Patrick's College (Strathfield, NSW), where he was Vice-Captain. He attended the University of Sydney where he graduated with a Bachelor of Arts and Bachelor of Laws. He was also awarded the Martin Sorensen Trophy for Best Speaker at the 1994 Australasian Intervarsity Debating Championships.

From 1993 to 1995, Burke worked as a staffer to Labor senators Graham Richardson and Michael Forshaw. In 1996, he and two friends from his university debating society established Atticus Pty Ltd., a business that provides training for "clients from the corporate and education sectors in advocacy and communication skills". It was named after the iconic fictional character Atticus Finch from the novel To Kill a Mockingbird. He resigned his directorship of the company the following year to join the Shop, Distributive and Allied Employees' Association (SDA) as a union organiser. He left the SDA in 2003 to run for the New South Wales Legislative Council.

== State politics ==
At the 2003 state election, Burke was elected to the New South Wales Legislative Council. He chaired the NSW State Development Committee, conducting inquiries into ports infrastructure and science commercialisation. He resigned from state parliament on 24 June 2004 to campaign for the New South Wales division of Watson. He won the seat at the 2004 federal election.

== Federal politics ==
A member of Labor Right, Burke was elected to the House of Representatives at the 2004 federal election, replacing the retiring Leo McLeay in the safe Labor seat of Watson. He and fellow Labor MP Linda Burney are the only members of the Federal Parliament to have always served as a minister or shadow minister. He was immediately promoted to the shadow ministry under Mark Latham, as Shadow Minister for Small Business. He was promoted to Shadow Minister for Immigration in June 2005, by which time Kim Beazley had replaced Latham as leader. After the 2006 leadership spill, the new leader Kevin Rudd expanded Burke's portfolio to Immigration, Integration and Citizenship.

=== Rudd and Gillard governments ===
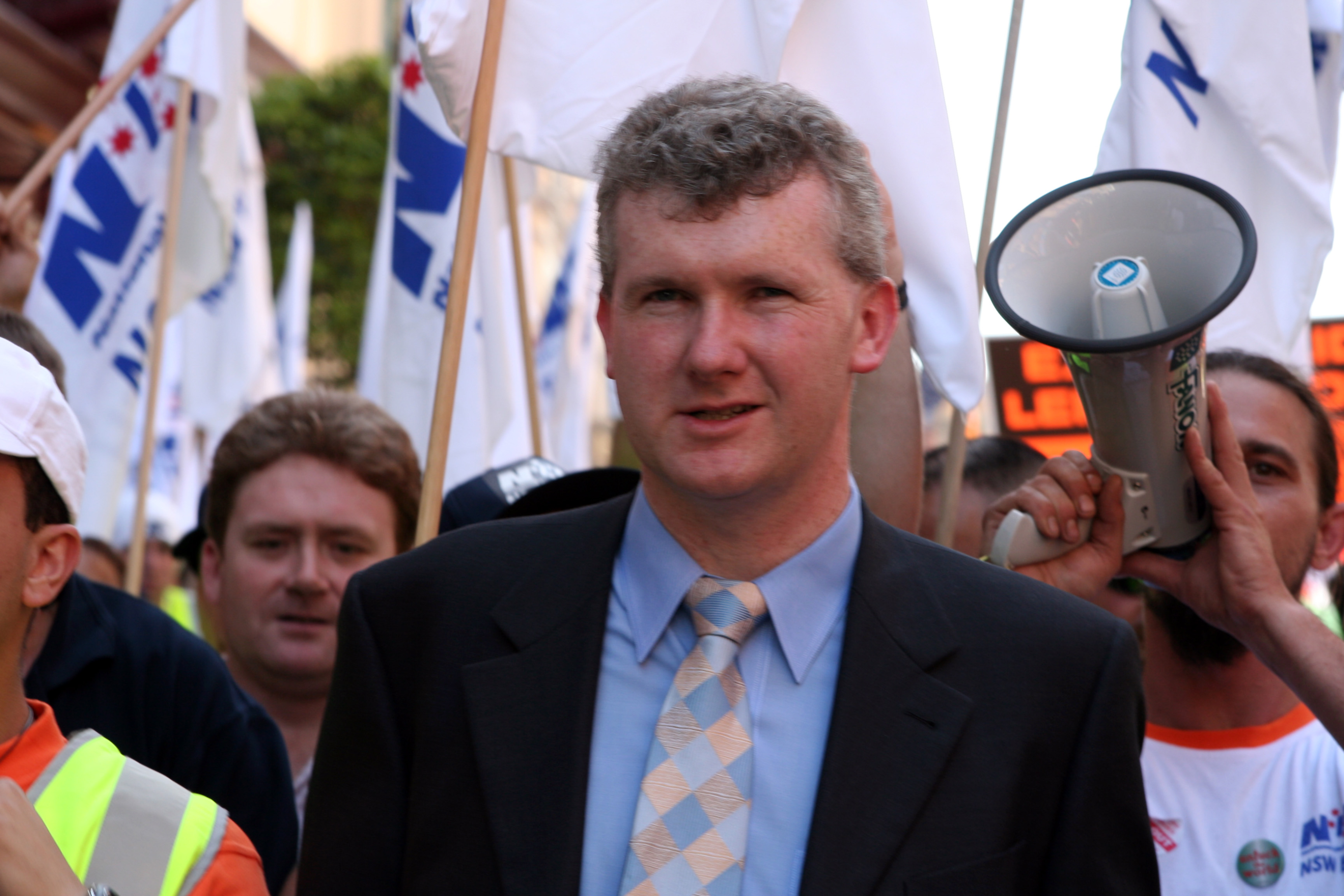
Burke at a 2005 protest against the Howard government's industrial relations policy

After the 2007 federal election, Burke was appointed Minister for Agriculture, Fisheries and Forestry in the new Rudd government. He was sworn in by the Governor-General on 3 December 2007. Burke oversaw the abolition of the Australian bulk wheat export monopoly after the AWB oil-for-wheat scandal. He oversaw the eradication of the horse flu in Australia after the 2007 equine influenza outbreak.

On 2 April 2010, Rudd appointed Burke as Minister for Population. The appointment came after Rudd stated he was in favour of a "big Australia" in response to demographic projections in the Government's Intergenerational Report showing the population of Australia would increase from 22 million in 2010 to 35 million in 2050. Burke's responsibilities included planning for the growth in Australia's population and coordinating the provision of services accordingly.

Following the 2010 federal election, Burke was appointed Minister for Sustainability, Environment, Water, Population and Communities. In March 2012, following the ALP leadership spill, Burke was also appointed Vice-President of the Executive Council.

As Minister for Sustainability, Environment, Water, Population and Communities, Burke established the Commonwealth Marine Reserve Network, the largest network of marine protected areas anywhere in the World and the world's second largest conservation determination after the preservation of Antarctica.

Burke also added koalas to the threatened species list in Queensland, NSW and the ACT. He also placed a ban on a controversial Dutch "super trawler" fishing vessel operating in waters off Tasmania.

He acted as a mediator in the long-running dispute between environmental groups and the Tasmanian forestry industry, culminating in the signing of the historic Tasmanian Forests Intergovernmental Agreement in 2011.

Burke often cites Labor's environmental credentials and the campaign to protect the Daintree Rainforest as the reason he got involved in politics. In government, Burke pushed to protect large areas of the Tasmanian Wilderness and the Ningaloo Reef by having them listed as UNESCO World Heritage Sites. In 2014, the Abbott government’s application to undo Burke's Tasmanian Wilderness World Heritage listing was rejected by the UNESCO World Heritage Committee. The Portuguese delegation called the delisting attempt "feeble".

In early 2011, Burke gave approval for the 100 per cent plantation timber Bell Bay Pulp Mill in the Tamar Valley after imposing stricter environmental conditions on the applicant Gunns Limited. Burke said many of the demands made by environmental groups opposed to the development had been addressed.

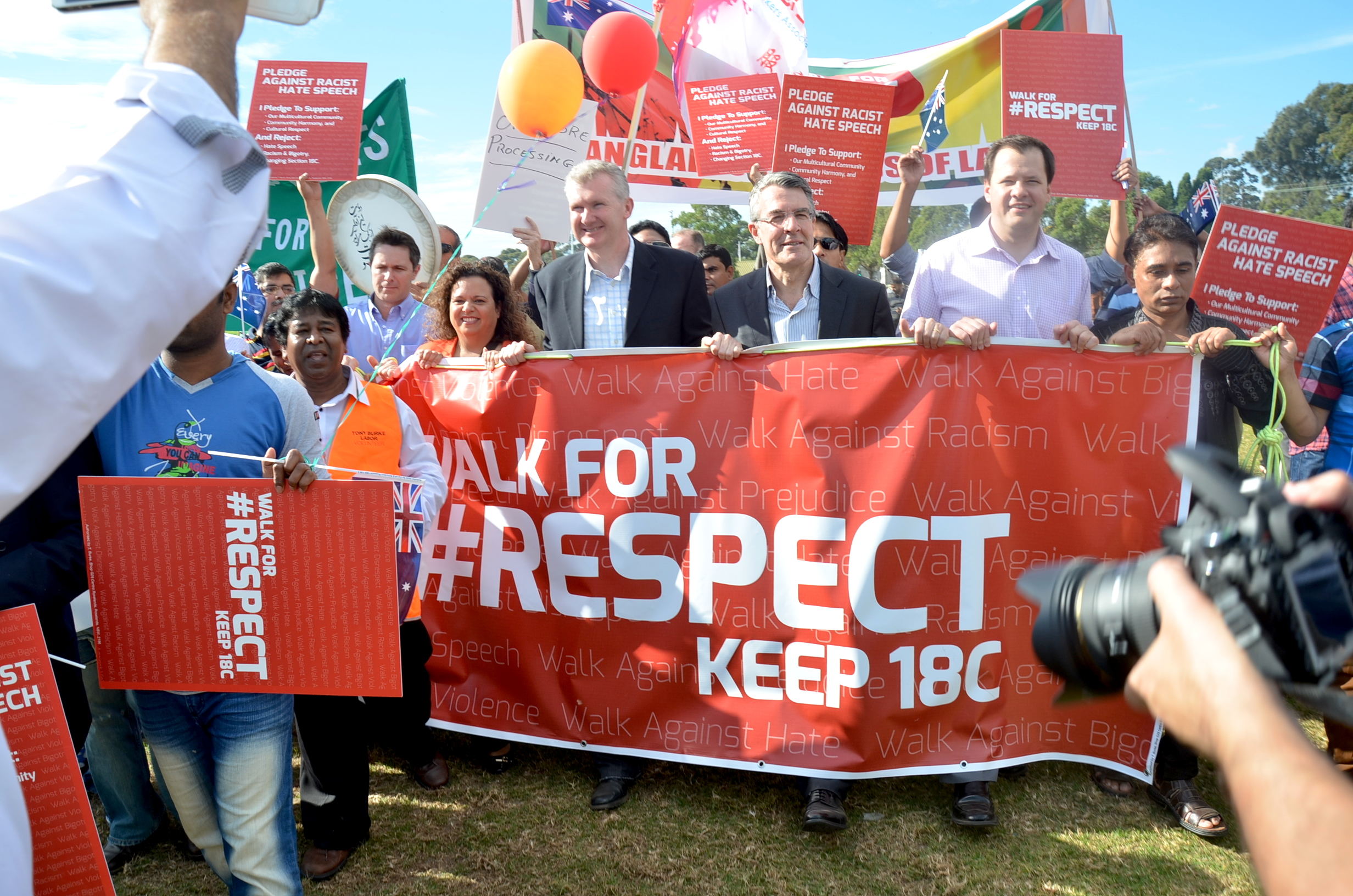
Burke in a 2014 protest against the Abbott government's proposed changes to section 18(c) of the Racial Discrimination Act

On 22 November 2012, Burke developed, negotiated and signed into law the Murray Darling Basin Plan, a process more than 100 years in the making, after extensive consultation with irrigators, environmental groups and state governments.

On 25 March 2013, Burke was appointed Minister for the Arts in the Second Gillard Ministry, in addition to his existing responsibilities. Burke took over the implementation of the Gillard government's Creative Australia policy after the former Minister for the Arts, Simon Crean, was sacked for his involvement in a failed attempt to return Kevin Rudd to the prime ministership. Following the June 2013 Labor leadership spill, which saw Gillard lose the Labor leadership, Rudd rejected Burke's offer to resign from the ministry. Burke, a Gillard supporter, had been critical of Rudd's performance during his previous tenure.

Rudd subsequently appointed Burke as Minister for Immigration, Multicultural Affairs and Citizenship in the Second Rudd Ministry. In this role he oversaw Rudd's resettlement plans with Papua New Guinea and Nauru, which saw an immediate and dramatic reduction in the number of people arriving by boat. During his short time as Minister for Immigration he also sought to release every unaccompanied minor who was in immigration detention.

=== Opposition (2013–2022) ===
Following Labor's 2013 election loss, Burke was appointed Shadow Finance Minister and Manager of Opposition Business.

After the 2016 federal election, Burke was appointed Shadow Minister for Environment and Water, Shadow Minister for Citizenship and Multicultural Australia, Shadow Minister for the Arts, in addition to his duties as the Manager of Opposition Business.

In 2019, he became Shadow Minister for Industrial Relations, ending his roles in Environment and Water, and Citizenship and Multicultural Australia, but retaining the Arts.

=== Albanese government (2022–present) ===
Following the 2022 federal election, Burke was appointed Leader of the House, Minister for Employment and Workplace Relations and Minister for the Arts in the Albanese ministry.

On 28 July 2024 it was announced that Burke would become the Minister for Home Affairs, Minister for Immigration, Citizenship and Multicultural Affairs and Minister for Cyber Security, in addition to continuing as the Minister for the Arts and Leader of the House, but would leave the role of Minister for Employment and Workplace Relations for Murray Watt.

Following the 2025 federal election, it was announced that Burke would retain the Arts and Home Affairs portfolios, and would also take responsibility for the Australian Federal Police and ASIO.

== Other political issues ==
=== Death penalty ===
While in opposition, Burke led an unsuccessful bipartisan appeal for clemency to the Singapore High Commissioner to stop the execution of convicted Australian drug smuggler, Van Tuong Nguyen. Seven years after Nguyen was executed Burke spoke at the launch of the SBS Better Man miniseries about Nguyen's case. At the launch, Burke referred to the meeting with the Singapore High Commissioner as "the worst day" of his political career and "potentially the most troubling day" of his life.

=== Racial Discrimination Act ===
Burke has been a vocal opponent of the Liberal National government's attempts to repeal Section 18C of the Racial Discrimination Act. In May 2014, Burke held a march against the changes to Section 18C in the Sydney suburb of Lakemba. The event was attended by more than 1,000 people protesting against the changes, which were subsequently dropped by the Abbott government.

The "Walk for Respect" was held again in 2017 in Lakemba when the Turnbull government again sought to remove certain protections against speech potentially considered to be racially offensive. The Walk was held on the same day the senate rejected the government amendments, this time with 3000 in attendance.

=== Euthanasia ===
Burke is opposed to the legalisation of euthanasia. He has said his opposition stems from the case of a friend who was incorrectly diagnosed with a terminal illness. In the 1990s, Burke served as the executive director of Euthanasia No!, a group that lobbied state and federal governments against altering the status quo on euthanasia. In 1996, he and a pro-euthanasia campaigner, Peter Baume, were invited to address the New South Wales Legislative Assembly before a debate on the subject, one of only a handful of occasions on which non-MPs have been invited to speak in parliament. He was later tasked with lobbying Labor senators to vote for what became the Euthanasia Laws Act 1997, which voided the Northern Territory's euthanasia laws. Burke was one of eight Labor MPs and Senators who opposed the Restoring Territory Rights Act 2022, which lifted the ban placed on the territories to legislate on euthanasia.

=== Same-sex marriage ===
Burke publicly announced his support of marriage equality in May 2015, and voted in favour of the Marriage Amendment (Definition and Religious Freedoms) Act 2017. He had previously voted against the Marriage Amendment Bill 2012, citing opposition within his constituency. His division had the second-highest percentage of "No" responses in the 2017 Australian Marriage Law Postal Survey, with 69.64% of the electorate's respondents to the survey responding "No".

== Personal life ==
Burke married Cathy Bresnan in 1994; after commencing their relationship in 1989. She subsequently took the surname Bresnan-Burke. The couple had three daughters together, but separated at the end of December 2012. The separation was not disclosed until the completion of the Federal Election in September 2013. In February 2014, The Australian reported that Burke had recently commenced a relationship with Skye Laris, his former chief of staff. Burke and Laris married in December 2015.

He is also known for his love of music and keeps musical instruments in his Parliament House office.

Burke has coeliac disease.

== See also ==
- Rudd Government (2007–10)
- Gillard Government
- Rudd Government (2013)
- Albanese Government

== Notes ==
Parliament of Australia
Preceded by Leo McLeay	Member of Parliament for Watson; 2004–present	Incumbent
Political offices
Preceded by Peter McGauran	Minister for Agriculture, Fisheries and Forestry; 2007–2010	Succeeded by Joe Ludwig
Vacant	Minister for Population; 2010	Succeeded by Himself as Minister for Sustainability, Environment, Water, Population and Communities
Preceded by Peter Garrett as Minister for Environment Protection, Heritage and the Arts	Minister for Sustainability, Environment, Water, Population and Communities; 2010–2013	Succeeded by Mark Butler as Minister for the Environment, Heritage and Water
Preceded by Penny Wong as Minister for Climate Change, Energy Efficiency and Water	Minister for Sustainability, Environment, Water, Population and Communities; 2010–2013	Succeeded by Mark Butler as Minister for the Environment, Heritage and Water
Preceded by Himself as Minister for Sustainable Population	Minister for Sustainability, Environment, Water, Population and Communities; 2010–2013	Succeeded by Mark Butler as Minister for the Environment, Heritage and Water
Preceded by Robert McClelland	Vice-President of the Executive Council; 2012–2013	Succeeded by George Brandis
Preceded by Simon Crean	Minister for the Arts; 2010–2013	Succeeded by George Brandis
Preceded by Brendan O'Connor as Minister for Immigration and Citizenship	Minister for Immigration, Multicultural Affairs and Citizenship; 2013	Succeeded by Scott Morrison as Minister for Immigration and Border Protection
Preceded by Kate Lundy as Minister for Multicultural Affairs	Minister for Immigration, Multicultural Affairs and Citizenship; 2013	Succeeded by Scott Morrison as Minister for Immigration and Border Protection
Preceded by Richard Marles	Minister for Employment and Workplace Relations; 2022–2024	Succeeded by Murray Watt
Preceded by Andrew Giles	Minister for Multicultural Affairs; 2024–2025	Succeeded by Anne Aly
Preceded by Peter Dutton	Leader of the House; 2022–present	Incumbent
Preceded by Paul Fletcher	Minister for the Arts; 2022–present	Incumbent
Preceded by Clare O'Neil	Minister for Home Affairs; 2024–present	Incumbent
Preceded by Clare O'Neil	Minister for Cyber Security; 2024–present	Incumbent
Preceded by Andrew Giles	Minister for Immigration; 2024–present	Incumbent
Preceded by Himself as Minister for Immigration and Multicultural Affairs	Minister for Citizenship; 2025–present	Incumbent
