= Minister for Cyber Security =

Australian cabinet position

- Commonwealth Coat of Arms

- Flag of Australia

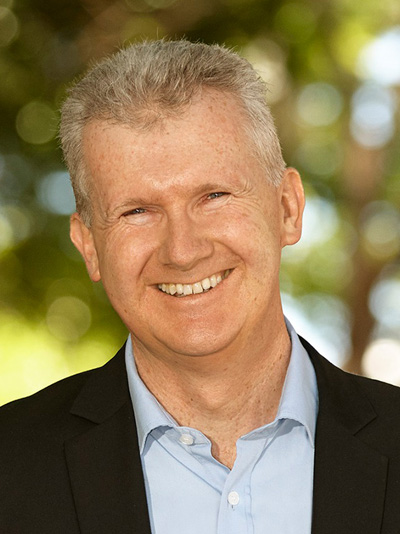
- Incumbent; Tony Burke since 29 July 2024
- Department of Home Affairs
- Style: The Honourable
- Appointer: Governor-General on the advice of the prime minister
- Inaugural holder: Dan Tehan (as Minister Assisting the Prime Minister for Cyber Security)
- Formation: 20 December 2017
- Website: minister.homeaffairs.gov.au/ministers-for-home-affairs/the-hon-tony-burke-mp

The Minister for Cyber Security is an Australian Government cabinet position which is currently held by Tony Burke since July 2024 in the Albanese ministry.

In the Government of Australia, the minister administers this portfolio through the Department of Home Affairs.

== List of ministers ==
=== Cyber security ===
The following individuals have been appointed as Minister for Cyber Security, or any of its precedent titles:

Order	Minister	Party	Ministry	Title	Term start	Term end	Term in office
1	Dan Tehan	Liberal	2nd Turnbull	Minister Assisting the Prime Minister for Cyber Security	19 July 2016	20 December 2017	1 year, 154 days
2	Angus Taylor	Liberal	2nd Turnbull	Minister for Law Enforcement and Cybersecurity	20 December 2017	28 August 2018	251 days
3	Paul Fletcher	Liberal	2nd Morrison	Minister for Communications, Cyber Safety and the Arts	29 May 2019	22 December 2020	1 year, 207 days
4	Jane Hume	Liberal	2nd Morrison	Minister for Superannuation, Financial Services and the Digital Economy	22 December 2020	23 May 2022	1 year, 152 days
5	Clare O'Neil	Labor	Albanese	Minister for Cyber Security	1 June 2022	29 July 2024	2 years, 58 days
6	Tony Burke	Labor	Albanese	Minister for Cyber Security	29 July 2024	Incumbent	2 years, 40 days
