= George Brandis =

Australian politician (born 1957)

The Honourable George Brandis KC
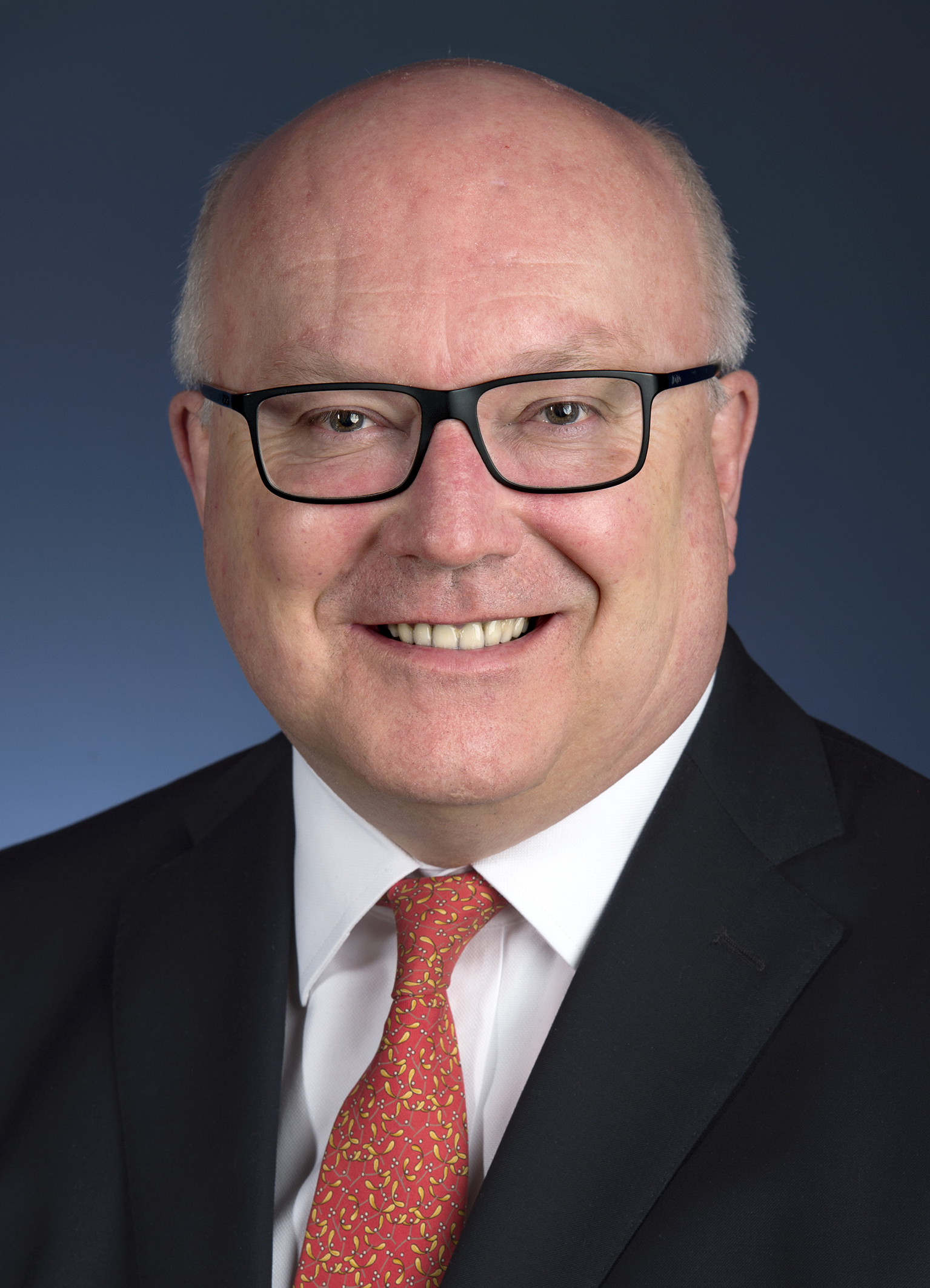
- Official portrait, 2017

Australian High Commissioner to the United Kingdom
- In office 30 April 2018 – 30 April 2022
- Monarch: Elizabeth II
- Prime Minister: Malcolm Turnbull; Scott Morrison
- Preceded by: Alexander Downer
- Succeeded by: Lynette Wood (Acting)

Attorney-General for Australia
- In office 18 September 2013 – 20 December 2017
- Prime Minister: Tony Abbott; Malcolm Turnbull
- Preceded by: Mark Dreyfus
- Succeeded by: Christian Porter

Leader of the Government in the Senate
- In office 21 September 2015 – 20 December 2017
- Prime Minister: Malcolm Turnbull
- Deputy: Mathias Cormann
- Preceded by: Eric Abetz
- Succeeded by: Mathias Cormann

Vice-President of the Executive Council
- In office 18 September 2013 – 20 December 2017
- Preceded by: Tony Burke
- Succeeded by: Mathias Cormann

Minister for the Arts
- In office 18 September 2013 – 21 September 2015
- Prime Minister: Tony Abbott; Malcolm Turnbull
- Preceded by: Tony Burke
- Succeeded by: Mitch Fifield

Minister for the Arts and Sport
- In office 30 January 2007 – 3 December 2007
- Prime Minister: John Howard
- Preceded by: Rod Kemp
- Succeeded by: Kate Ellis (Sport); Peter Garrett (Arts)

Senator for Queensland
- In office 16 May 2000 – 8 February 2018
- Preceded by: Warwick Parer
- Succeeded by: Amanda Stoker

Personal details
- Born: George Henry Brandis; 22 June 1957 (age 69) Sydney, New South Wales, Australia
- Party: Liberal Party
- Other political affiliations: Liberal National Party
- Children: 2
- Education: University of Queensland; Magdalen College, Oxford

George Henry Brandis KC (born 22 June 1957) is an Australian former politician. He was a Senator for Queensland from 2000 to 2018, representing the Liberal Party, and was a cabinet minister in the Abbott and Turnbull governments. He was later High Commissioner to the United Kingdom from 2018 to 2022.

Brandis studied law at the University of Queensland and Magdalen College, Oxford. Before entering politics he practised as a barrister. He was appointed to the Senate in 2000 to fill the casual vacancy caused by the resignation of Warwick Parer. He served as Minister for the Arts and Sport for the last year of the Howard government in 2007. When the Coalition returned to power in 2013, Brandis became Attorney-General and Minister for the Arts. He relinquished the latter portfolio in 2015, when Malcolm Turnbull became prime minister, but was instead made Leader of the Government in the Senate.

Brandis announced his retirement from politics in December 2017, with effect from February 2018. He replaced Alexander Downer as High Commissioner to the United Kingdom in May 2018, departing the role in April 2022. In June 2022, Brandis was appointed a professor in national security at the Australian National University.

== Early life ==
Brandis was born in Sydney and was brought up in the inner-west suburb of Petersham. He attended Christian Brothers' High School, Lewisham before moving to Brisbane and attending Villanova College and the University of Queensland, where he graduated with a Bachelor of Arts with First-Class Honours in 1978 and a Bachelor of Laws with First-Class Honours in 1980.

Following graduation, Brandis served as Associate to Justice Charles Sheahan of the Queensland Supreme Court. He was then elected a Commonwealth Scholar and obtained a Bachelor of Civil Law from Magdalen College, Oxford in 1983.

== Legal career ==
After a brief period as a solicitor in Brisbane, Brandis was called to the Queensland Bar in 1985 where he practised until entering politics in 2000. Brandis developed a commercial practice with a particular emphasis on trade practices law. He appeared as junior counsel in the High Court of Australia in the equity case Warman v Dwyer. He was also the junior barrister for the plaintiff in the long running Multigroup Distribution Services v TNT Australia litigation in the Federal Court of Australia.

Brandis applied to be appointed Senior Counsel in the late 1990s, but was unsuccessful. Brandis applied again in 2006. He was not on the Queensland Bar Association's shortlist; however the Chief Justice of Queensland, Paul de Jersey, who had the power to make the ultimate determination, added Brandis' name to the list, and Brandis was appointed Senior Counsel in November 2006. This was controversial, since Brandis had not practised at the bar since 2000. In June 2013, the original title of Queen's Counsel was restored by the Queensland Government and Brandis was one of 70 (out of 74) Queensland SCs who chose to become QCs.

Brandis has co-edited two books on liberalism, and published academic articles on various legal topics, one of which was cited by the High Court of Australia in the landmark defamation case ABC v O'Neill.

While at the Bar, Brandis was a board member of UNICEF Australia for 10 years. He has also been an Associate of the Australian Institute for Ethics and the Professions, and lectured in jurisprudence at the University of Queensland from 1984 to 1991.

== Early political involvement ==
According to Peter Baume, during the 1980s Brandis was a key member of the Liberal Forum, a social or classical liberal faction within the party. He "cut his political teeth fighting a rearguard action against the incoming tide of neoliberal economics and a muscular social conservatism that increasingly came to characterise the party in the late 1980s and early 1990s". He was a co-editor of two anthologies produced by members of the faction, titled Liberals Face the Future (1984) and Australian Liberalism: The Continuing Vision (1986).

== Parliamentary career ==
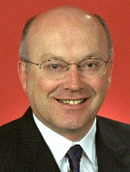
Brandis early in his political career

Brandis was first chosen by the Parliament of Queensland to fill a casual vacancy following the resignation of Senator the Honourable Warwick Parer. He was elected to a further six-year term at the 2004 election.

In his period as a senator, he has served as Chairman of the Economics Committee and as Chairman of the Senate's Children Overboard Inquiry.

Brandis has also made a number of public speeches. In 2003, he described the Australian Greens as eco-fascist.

Brandis claimed over $1,000 in taxpayer expenses to attend the inaugural Sir Garfield Barwick address in Sydney on 28 June 2010. The event was billed as a Liberal party fund-raiser.

In 2016 Brandis was caught on a "hot mic" calling his state colleagues in the Queensland Liberal National Party "very very mediocre".

== Ministerial career ==
=== Howard administration ===
On 23 January 2007, Brandis was appointed Minister for the Arts and Sport, replacing Senator Rod Kemp. He lost his ministerial position on the defeat of the Howard government in the 2007 election.

=== Shadow ministry ===
On 6 December 2007 the new Leader of the Parliamentary Liberal Party, Brendan Nelson, appointed Brandis Shadow Attorney-General, a position he continued to hold under the leadership of Malcolm Turnbull.

On 2 June 2008 Brandis, in his capacity as Shadow Attorney-General, referred the Same-Sex Relationships (Equal Treatment in Commonwealth Laws – Superannuation) Bill 2008 to a Senate committee for review. The aim of the bill was to remove legislative provisions that discriminated against gay and lesbian citizens, in this case relating to superannuation. Brandis stated that the Opposition believed discrimination of this type should be removed and supported the Labor government's bill against the more conservative elements of his own party. However, he insisted on a review of the proposed legislation prior to enactment. The bill was passed into law with bipartisan support on 9 December 2008.

Brandis consistently opposed proposals for a bill of rights.

In January 2010, Brandis commented on a controversial debate between Deputy Prime Minister Julia Gillard and federal Opposition Leader Tony Abbott on the topic of advice given to children regarding abstinence.

=== Abbott government ===
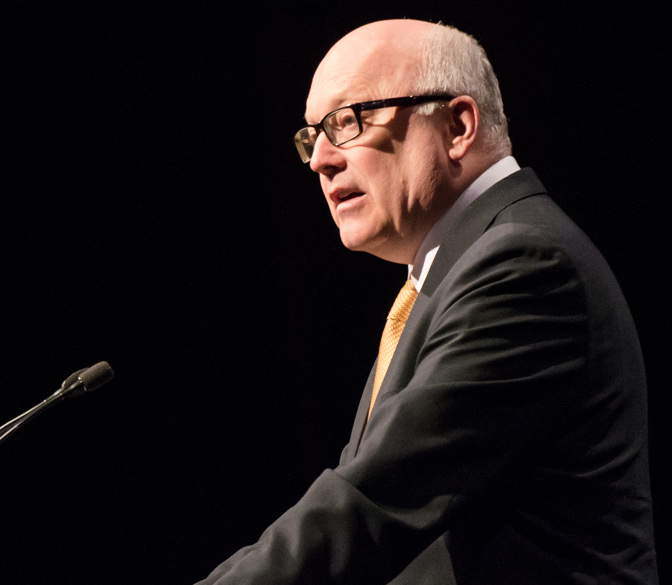
Brandis in 2014

Following the 2010 Australian federal election, at which he was returned, Brandis was appointed Shadow Attorney-General, Shadow Minister for the Arts and Deputy Leader of the Opposition in the Senate in the Abbott shadow ministry.

In 2011, Brandis submitted specific accusations to NSW police commissioner Andrew Scipione that sitting federal M.P. Craig Thomson committed larceny and fraud through misuse of a credit card in the Health Services Union expenses affair. This led to some questioning Brandis's suitability as attorney-general if the opportunity ever arose.

Brandis faced public scrutiny when it was revealed that in 2011 he had billed the taxpayer for attending the wedding ceremony of Sydney radio shock-jock Michael Smith, who had colluded with Brandis to publicise the Craig Thomson media saga.

As Arts Minister, Brandis received significant criticism from the arts industry for a $105 million cut to the Australia Council for the Arts funding in the 2015–16 Australian Federal Budget. The money was reallocated to a new program, The National Program for Excellence in the Arts (NPEA). The NPEA in turn has been criticised by many artists and arts organisations for lacking the "arms-length" funding principles that have applied to the relationship between the government and the Australia Council since its inception in the 1970s. These principles have traditionally had bipartisan support. Brandis had been criticised previously for giving Melbourne classical music record label Melba Recordings a $275,000 grant outside of the usual funding and peer-assessment processes. Brandis's changes to funding arrangements, including the quarantining of the amount received by Australia's 28 major performing arts companies, are widely seen to disadvantage the small-to-medium arts sector and independent artists. Following Malcolm Turnbull's successful spill of the leadership of the Liberal party in September 2015, Brandis was replaced as arts minister by Mitch Fifield.

==== Freedom of speech and Section 18C ====
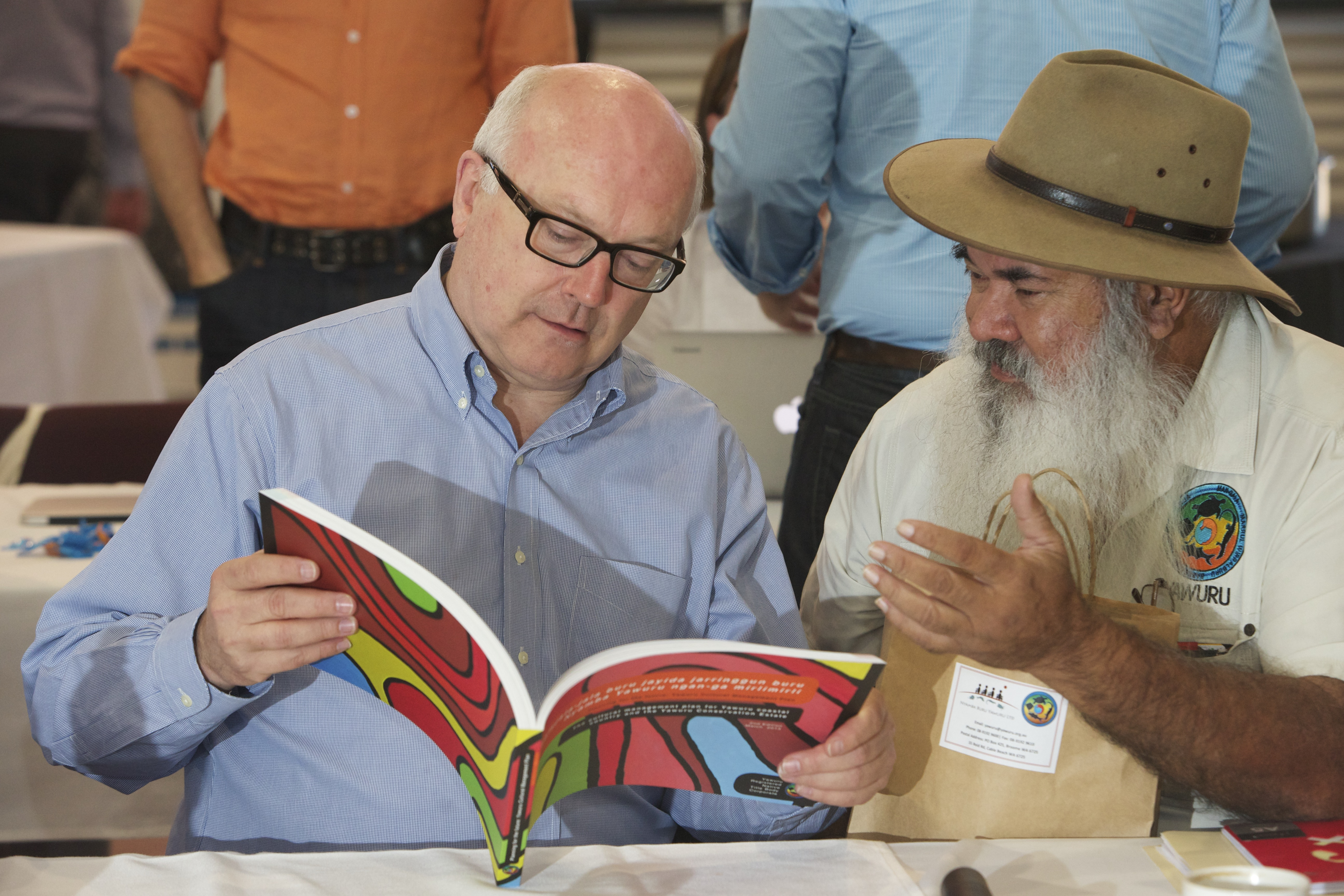
Brandis in 2015 with Aboriginal leader Patrick Dodson

The Abbott government took a proposal to amend the Racial Discrimination Act to the 2013 federal election. The Government argued that the Act unduly restricted free speech in Australia, by making "insult" and "offence" the test for breach of the law. As Attorney-General, Brandis argued the case for amending the Keating government's controversial Section 18C of the Act. In March 2013, Brandis released draft amendments for community consultation, and announced that the proposed changes would "strengthen the Act's protections against racism, while at the same time removing provisions which unreasonably limit freedom of speech." After community consultation, the Government was unable to secure support for changes to the Act from the Senate, and the Abbott government shelved the proposal. The draft amendments had met with criticism from the ALP, Liberal MP Ken Wyatt, and an alliance of racial minority representatives including Jewish lobby groups concerned with holocaust denials in the media.

Brandis did not support the Labor government's proposed media reforms in 2013, and was outspoken in support of greater press freedom, particularly for Andrew Bolt who was found to have breached racial vilification laws in commenting on Indigenous Australians of mixed-race descent. As Attorney-General in 2014, Brandis furthered his push to amend the RDA, in part to allow media commentators such as Andrew Bolt greater freedom of expression, and to legally ensure that "people do have a right to be bigots". Brandis labelled Bolt's comments on mixed descent Aboriginal people, found by the Federal Court to be racial vilification, as "quite reasonable", although the federal court found Bolt violated the RDA and the plaintiffs were awarded an apology and legal costs. Professor Marcia Langton was a vocal public critic of Brandis's proposed repeal of the part of the RDA on which the Bolt case was based.

In 2017, Brandis condemned Pauline Hanson for wearing a Burqa in the Senate Chamber, explaining her "stunt" ridiculed the Muslim community and mocked its religious garments, and he cautioned her against the offence she might cause to the religious sensibilities of Muslim Australians.

==== East Timor spying case ====
Brandis supported and approved a December 2013 ASIO raid on Bernard Collaery’s Canberra office (a legal representative for East Timor), where all documents and computers were seized by the government, and which Brandis claimed was for national security interests. Shortly after the raid, the International Court of Justice (ICJ) ruled that the Australian government was not permitted to use or view any of the raid evidence. Brandis claimed the ICJ ruling was a good outcome for the government. The Timor Gap case involved allegations of ASIS spying during commercial negotiations with the East Timorese over the $40 billion oil and gas reserves of the contested Greater Sunrise fields within the East Timorese exclusive economic zone.

Additionally Brandis approved the ASIO raid and passport cancellation of a former Australian Secret Intelligence Service (ASIS) agent, who was a director of technical operations at ASIS and the whistle-blower on the allegations of commercial spying done by Australia on East Timor, which consequently prevented the unnamed former agent from testifying at the ICJ in the Netherlands.

==== Bookshelves ====
In February 2015, it was reported that more than $15,000 of taxpayer money was spent on a second custom-built bookshelf in Brandis' Parliamentary office to house Brandis' collection of books and law reports. There had earlier been a $7,000 taxpayer-funded bookcase purchased in 2010 to store $13,000 worth of tax-payer funded books, but a new bookcase was reportedly required because the 2010 version was too large to move to Senator Brandis' new office following the change of government.

==== Dealings with the Australian Human Rights Commission ====
In February 2015, Brandis made headlines when he questioned the independence and impartiality of the President of the Australian Human Rights Commission, Gillian Triggs, following the public release of a report by the Commission into children in detention which was critical of the Government. Brandis said he had lost confidence in Triggs and the Commission because in October 2014 she had given "inconsistent and evasive" evidence to Senate estimates when explaining the timing of her decision to hold the investigation into children in detention which resulted in the report. Brandis said that the "political impartiality" of the commission had been "fatally compromised" because the commission had only investigated the issue after the Liberal-National Coalition were elected to power, even though there had been a large number of people in detention under the previous Labor government. This, Brandis claimed, was a "catastrophic error of judgement".

Triggs defended her decision to commence the investigation in early 2014, saying that although the number of detainees had begun to fall while the Coalition were in Government, the length of time in detention had been rising.

Further controversy arose when Triggs told a Senate Estimates hearing that Brandis' departmental secretary had on 3 February 2015 asked her to resign, just prior to the public release of the commission's report. Triggs said that she was told that she would be offered "other work with the government" if she resigned. Initially the Prime Minister and the Foreign Minister, Julie Bishop, denied that any offer of any other role was made to Triggs. However, Bishop conceded that an international role had been discussed with Triggs in early February, during a meeting in her office with the secretary of the Attorney-General's Department, Chris Moraitis.

Some government sources had suggested that Triggs had wanted to be "looked after" if she quit the commission. However, Triggs said she "categorically denies any suggestion that the issue of a job offer and resignation came at [her] instigation". Triggs said at the Senate hearing that she considered the offer made to her a "disgraceful proposition".

These events prompted Mark Dreyfus, Labor's Shadow Attorney-General, to refer the matter to the Australian Federal Police. Dreyfus said that an offer by Brandis to an independent statutory officer of an inducement to resign, with the object of affecting the leadership of the commission to avoid political damage, may constitute corrupt or unlawful conduct. The Australian Senate also took up the matter, passing a motion to censure Brandis on 2 March.

=== Turnbull government ===
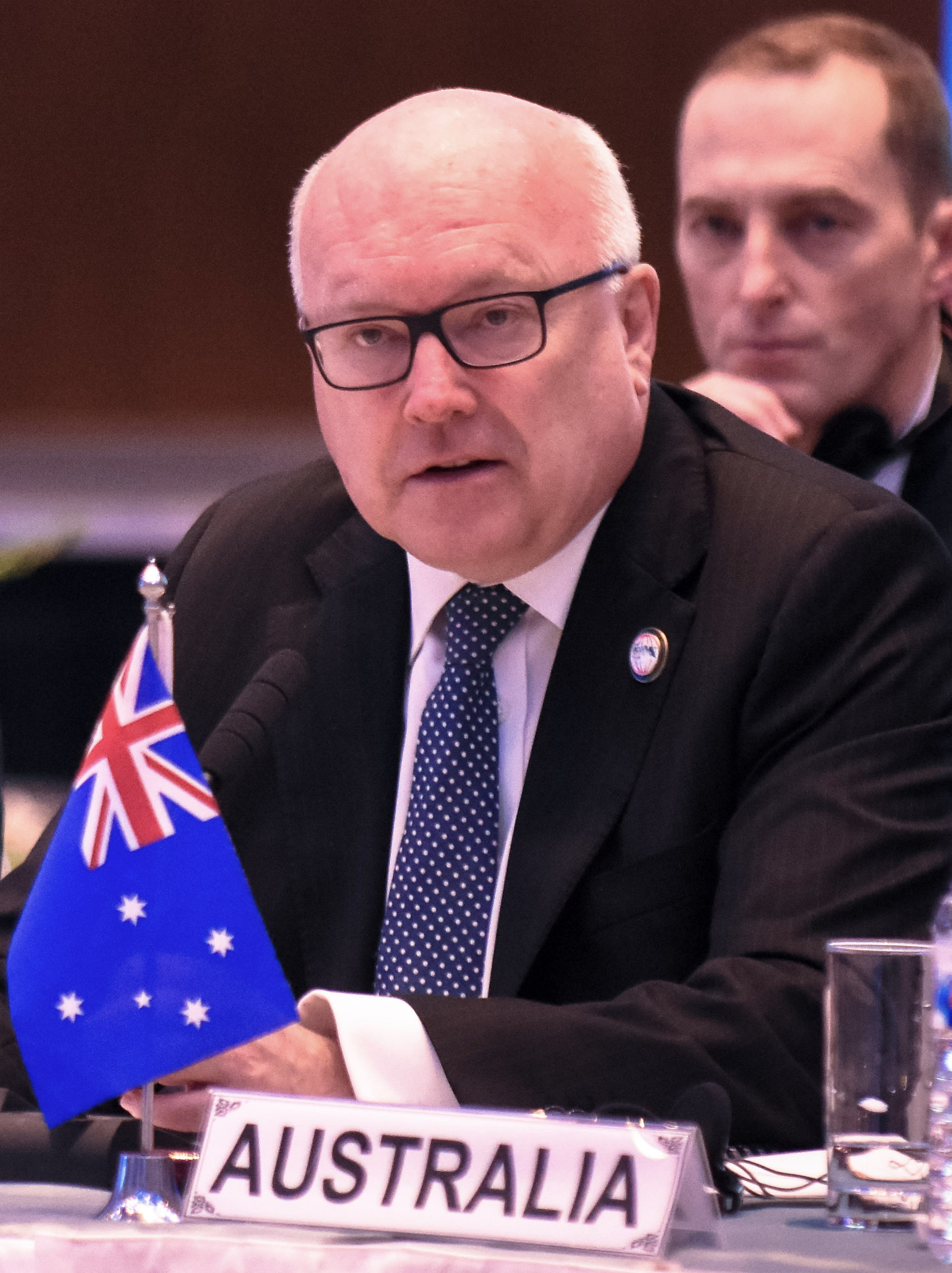
Brandis at the 2017 Sub-Regional Meeting in Indonesia

==== Legal advice controversy ====
In October 2016, allegations were made by Australia's Solicitor-General, Justin Gleeson SC, suggesting that Brandis attempted to block the Solicitor-General from providing legal advice to members of the Australian Government without first seeking and receiving the permission of the Attorney-General. Further allegations were made by Labor party ministers that Brandis had misled parliament on the issue, including those by the Shadow Attorney-General, Mark Dreyfus, who challenged the independence of Brandis's office.

On 25 November 2016, The West Australian newspaper reported that the reason for Brandis issuing the direction was that Gleeson had provided advice on behalf of the Australian Taxation Office (ATO) in a High Court case over the collapse of The Bell Group in 1991. The Western Australian government had passed legislation (Bell Group Company’s Finalisation of Matters and Distribution of Proceeds Act 2015), elevating the Insurance Commission of WA in the queue of Bell Group creditors ahead of the ATO. In April 2015, the WA state government received an assurance from then federal Treasurer Joe Hockey that the Commonwealth would not intervene, however the ATO sought advice from Gleeson as its counsel that federal taxation law overrode the state legislation. The paper alleged that Brandis had told Gleeson not to run the argument, however it was still contained in the ATO's submission to the High Court, which subsequently unanimously rejected the WA government's case and struck down the Bell Act.

==== Appointments ====
Prior to the 2016 federal election, Brandis appointed a Liberal Party donor and Brisbane lawyer, Theo Tavoularis, who had represented Brandis' son in court, to the Administrative Appeals Tribunal. Later in December 2016, Brandis appointed two former Members of Parliament and members of the Liberal Party, who had been voted out at the 2016 federal election, to the Administrative Appeals Tribunal for a 7-year term. Each role has a salary of over $200,000.

==== Resignation ====
Leading up to the 2018 Liberal Party of Australia leadership spills, Brandis was increasingly willing to assert "small-l liberal" positions and publicly criticised the coalition government and members of his own party, particularly the Conservative-wing of the party, including Immigration Minister Peter Dutton. Brandis was reported as being concerned about the new formation of the Department of Home Affairs under Dutton. Shortly after Dutton criticised lawyers who represented refugees and asylum seekers as "un-Australian", Brandis gave a speech which championed lawyers and their role in ensuring the supremacy of the law against the executive government, which was largely seen as an attack on Dutton's comments.

Brandis formally resigned from the Senate on 8 February 2018. In his farewell speech to the Senate he was critical of anti-terrorism laws being used by his own party as a "political weapon" and warned against the "powerful elements of right-wing politics" who had abandoned concern for the rights of the individual in favour of a "belligerent, intolerant populism".

== Post-political career ==
Brandis was appointed to fill the post of Australia's next High Commissioner to the United Kingdom. Due to take up the role in March 2018, an Achilles tendon injury delayed his official term start until 3 May 2018. His term as High Commissioner ended in 2022 and he was subsequently appointed a professor at the Australian National University, to teach at the ANU College of Law with a focus on national security, law and policy. He is an Advisory Board member of the Council on Geostrategy. He is a regular columnist for The Sydney Morning Herald.

Political offices
Preceded by Rod Kemp	Minister for the Arts and Sport; 2007	Succeeded by Peter Garrett as Minister for the Environment, Heritage and the Arts
Preceded by Rod Kemp	Minister for the Arts and Sport; 2007	Succeeded by Kate Ellis as Minister for Youth and Sport
Preceded by Mark Dreyfus	Attorney-General for Australia; 2013–2017	Succeeded by Christian Porter
Preceded by Tony Burke	Vice President of the Executive Council; 2013–2017	Succeeded by Mathias Cormann
Preceded by Tony Burke	Minister for the Arts; 2013–2015	Succeeded by Mitch Fifield
Party political offices
Preceded by Eric Abetz	Leader of the Liberal Party in the Senate; 2015–2017	Succeeded by Mathias Cormann
Diplomatic posts
Preceded by Alexander Downer	Australian High Commissioner to the United Kingdom; 2018–2022	Succeeded by Lynette Wood as Acting High Commissioner
