= Minister for Communications (Australia) =

Australian cabinet position

- Commonwealth Coat of Arms

- Flag of Australia

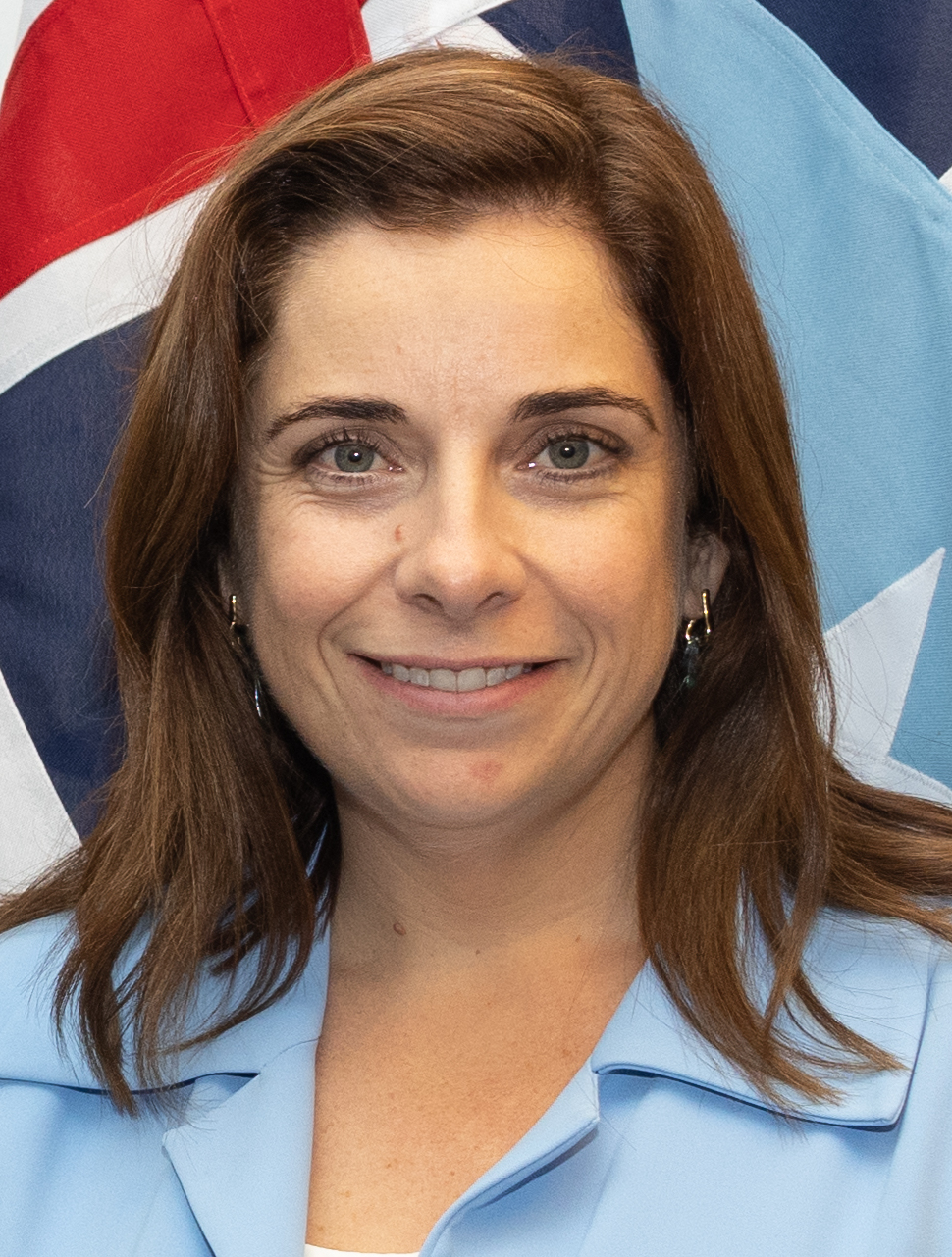
- Incumbent; Anika Wells since 13 May 2025
- Department of Infrastructure, Transport, Regional Development, Communications, Sport and the Arts
- Style: The Honourable
- Appointer: Governor-General on the recommendation of the Prime Minister of Australia
- Inaugural holder: John Forrest (as Postmaster-General)
- Formation: 1 January 1901
- Website: minister.infrastructure.gov.au/wells

The Minister for Communications is a member of the Cabinet of Australia with overall responsibility for broadcasting, the information and communications technology industry, the information economy, and national telecommunications. The portfolio has been held by Anika Wells under the second Albanese ministry since 13 May 2025, following the 2025 Australian federal election.

In the Government of Australia, the minister administers the communications portfolio through the Department of Infrastructure, Transport, Regional Development, Communications, Sport and the Arts.

== Scope ==
Portfolio agencies and bodies include:

- Australian Broadcasting Corporation
- Australian Communications and Media Authority
- Australia Post
- Australian Classification Board
- National Library of Australia
- NBN Co
- Special Broadcasting Service

== List of ministers ==
The minister responsible for telecommunications policy has had various titles. From 1901 until December 1975 it was the Postmaster-General, who administered the portfolio through the Postmaster-General's Department.

The following individuals have been appointed as Minister for Communications, or any of its precedent titles:

| Order | Minister | Party | Prime Minister | Title | Term start | Term end | Term in office |
|---|---|---|---|---|---|---|---|
| 1 | John Forrest | Protectionist | Barton | Postmaster-General | 1 January 1901 | 17 January 1901 | 16 days |
| 2 | James Drake | Protectionist | Barton | Postmaster-General | 5 February 1901 | 10 August 1903 | 2 years, 186 days |
| 3 | Philip Fysh | Protectionist | Barton | Postmaster-General | 10 August 1903 | 24 September 1903 | 261 days |
| 3 | Philip Fysh | Protectionist | Deakin | Postmaster-General | 24 September 1903 | 27 April 1904 | 261 days |
| 4 | Hugh Mahon | Labor | Watson | Postmaster-General | 27 April 1904 | 17 August 1904 | 112 days |
| 5 | Sydney Smith | Free Trade | George Reid | Postmaster-General | 17 August 1904 | 5 July 1905 | 322 days |
| 6 | Austin Chapman | Protectionist | Deakin | Postmaster-General | 5 July 1905 | 30 July 1907 | 2 years, 25 days |
| 7 | Samuel Mauger | Protectionist | Deakin | Postmaster-General | 30 July 1907 | 13 November 1908 | 1 year, 106 days |
| 8 | Josiah Thomas | Labor | Fisher | Postmaster-General | 13 November 1908 | 2 June 1909 | 201 days |
| 9 | John Quick | Protectionist | Deakin | Postmaster-General | 2 June 1909 | 29 April 1910 | 331 days |
| 10 | Josiah Thomas | Labor | Fisher | Postmaster-General | 29 April 1910 | 14 October 1911 | 1 year, 168 days |
| 11 | Charlie Frazer | Labor | Fisher | Postmaster-General | 14 October 1911 | 24 June 1913 | 1 year, 253 days |
| 12 | Agar Wynne | Liberal | Cook | Postmaster-General | 24 June 1913 | 17 September 1914 | 1 year, 85 days |
| 13 | William Spence | Labor | Fisher | Postmaster-General | 17 September 1914 | 27 October 1915 | 1 year, 40 days |
| 14 | William Webster | Labor | Hughes | Postmaster-General | 27 October 1915 | 14 November 1916 | 4 years, 99 days |
| 14 | William Webster | National Labor | Hughes | Postmaster-General | 14 November 1916 | 17 February 1917 | 4 years, 99 days |
| 14 | William Webster | Nationalist | Hughes | Postmaster-General | 17 February 1917 | 3 February 1920 | 4 years, 99 days |
| 15 | George Wise | Nationalist | Hughes | Postmaster-General | 3 February 1920 | 21 December 1921 | 1 year, 321 days |
| 16 | Alexander Poynton | Nationalist | Hughes | Postmaster-General | 21 December 1921 | 5 February 1923 | 1 year, 46 days |
| 17 | William Gibson | Country | Bruce | Postmaster-General | 5 February 1923 | 22 October 1929 | 6 years, 259 days |
| 18 | Joseph Lyons | Labor | Scullin | Postmaster-General | 22 October 1929 | 4 February 1931 | 1 year, 105 days |
| 19 | Albert Green | Labor | Scullin | Postmaster-General | 4 February 1931 | 6 January 1932 | 336 days |
| 20 | James Fenton | United Australia | Lyons | Postmaster-General | 6 January 1932 | 13 October 1932 | 281 days |
| 21 | Archdale Parkhill | United Australia | Lyons | Postmaster-General | 13 October 1932 | 12 October 1934 | 1 year, 364 days |
| 22 | Alexander McLachlan | United Australia | Lyons | Postmaster-General | 12 October 1934 | 7 November 1938 | 6 years, 25 days |
| 23 | Archie Cameron | Country | Lyons | Postmaster-General | 7 November 1938 | 7 April 1939 | 170 days |
| 23 | Archie Cameron | Country | Page | Postmaster-General | 7 April 1939 | 26 April 1939 | 170 days |
| 24 | Eric Harrison | United Australia | Menzies | Postmaster-General | 26 April 1939 | 14 March 1940 | 323 days |
| 25 | Harold Thorby | Country | Menzies | Postmaster-General | 14 March 1940 | 28 October 1940 | 228 days |
| 26 | George McLeay | United Australia | Menzies | Postmaster-General | 28 October 1940 | 26 June 1941 | 241 days |
| 27 | Thomas Collins | Country | Menzies | Postmaster-General | 26 June 1941 | 29 August 1941 | 103 days |
| 27 | Thomas Collins | Country | Fadden | Postmaster-General | 29 August 1941 | 7 October 1941 | 103 days |
| 28 | Bill Ashley | Labor | Curtin | Postmaster-General | 7 October 1941 | 2 February 1945 | 3 years, 118 days |
| 29 | Don Cameron | Labor | Curtin | Postmaster-General | 2 February 1945 | 6 July 1945 | 4 years, 320 days |
| 29 | Don Cameron | Labor | Forde | Postmaster-General | 6 July 1945 | 13 July 1945 | 4 years, 320 days |
| 29 | Don Cameron | Labor | Chifley | Postmaster-General | 13 July 1945 | 19 December 1949 | 4 years, 320 days |
| 30 | Larry Anthony | Country | Menzies | Postmaster-General | 19 December 1949 | 11 January 1956 | 6 years, 23 days |
| 31 | Charles Davidson | Country | Menzies | Postmaster-General | 11 January 1956 | 18 December 1963 | 7 years, 341 days |
| 32 | Alan Hulme | Liberal | Menzies | Postmaster-General | 18 December 1963 | 26 January 1966 | 8 years, 353 days |
| 32 | Alan Hulme | Liberal | Holt | Postmaster-General | 26 January 1966 | 19 December 1967 | 8 years, 353 days |
| 32 | Alan Hulme | Liberal | McEwen | Postmaster-General | 19 December 1967 | 10 January 1968 | 8 years, 353 days |
| 32 | Alan Hulme | Liberal | Gorton | Postmaster-General | 10 January 1968 | 10 March 1971 | 8 years, 353 days |
| 32 | Alan Hulme | Liberal | McMahon | Postmaster-General | 10 March 1971 | 5 December 1972 | 8 years, 353 days |
| 33 | Lance Barnard^{1} | Labor | Whitlam | Postmaster-General | 5 December 1972 | 19 December 1972 | 14 days |
| 34 | Lionel Bowen | Labor | Whitlam | Postmaster-General | 19 December 1972 | 12 June 1974 | 1 year, 175 days |
| 35 | Reg Bishop | Labor | Whitlam | Postmaster-General | 12 June 1974 | 11 November 1975 | 1 year, 152 days |
| 36 | Peter Nixon | National Country | Fraser | Postmaster-General | 11 November 1975 | 22 December 1975 | 41 days |
| 37 | Victor Garland | Liberal | Fraser | Minister for Post and Telecommunications | 22 December 1975 | 6 December 1976 | 350 days |
| 38 | Eric Robinson | Liberal | Fraser | Minister for Post and Telecommunications | 6 December 1976 | 20 December 1977 | 1 year, 14 days |
| 39 | Tony Staley | Liberal | Fraser | Minister for Post and Telecommunications | 20 December 1977 | 3 November 1980 | 2 years, 319 days |
| 40 | Ian Sinclair | National Country | Fraser | Minister for Communications | 3 November 1980 | 7 May 1982 | 1 year, 185 days |
| 41 | Neil Brown | Liberal | Fraser | Minister for Communications | 7 May 1982 | 11 March 1983 | 308 days |
| 42 | Michael Duffy | Labor | Hawke | Minister for Communications | 11 March 1983 | 24 July 1987 | 4 years, 135 days |
| 43 | Gareth Evans | Labor | Hawke | Minister for Transport and Communications^{2} | 24 July 1987 | 2 September 1988 | 1 year, 40 days |
| 44 | Ralph Willis | Labor | Hawke | Minister for Transport and Communications^{2} | 2 September 1988 | 4 April 1990 | 1 year, 214 days |
| 45 | Kim Beazley | Labor | Hawke | Minister for Transport and Communications^{2} | 4 April 1990 | 9 December 1991 | 1 year, 249 days |
| 46 | John Kerin | Labor | Hawke | Minister for Transport and Communications^{2} | 9 December 1991 | 20 December 1991 | 18 days |
| 46 | John Kerin | Labor | Keating | Minister for Transport and Communications^{2} | 20 December 1991 | 27 December 1991 | 18 days |
| 47 | Graham Richardson | Labor | Keating | Minister for Transport and Communications^{2} | 27 December 1991 | 18 May 1992 | 143 days |
| 48 | Bob Collins | Labor | Keating | Minister for Transport and Communications^{2} | 18 May 1992 | 23 December 1993 | 1 year, 219 days |
| 49 | Michael Lee | Labor | Keating | Minister for Communications | 23 December 1993 | 30 January 1994 | 2 years, 79 days |
| 49 | Michael Lee | Labor | Keating | Minister for Communications and the Arts | 30 January 1994 | 11 March 1996 | 2 years, 79 days |
| 50 | Richard Alston | Liberal | Howard | Minister for Communications and the Arts | 11 March 1996 | 9 October 1997 | 7 years, 210 days |
| 50 | Richard Alston | Liberal | Howard | Minister for Communications, the Information Economy and the Arts | 9 October 1997 | 21 October 1998 | 7 years, 210 days |
| 50 | Richard Alston | Liberal | Howard | Minister for Communications, Information Technology and the Arts | 21 October 1998 | 7 October 2003 | 7 years, 210 days |
| 51 | Daryl Williams | Liberal | Howard | Minister for Communications, Information Technology and the Arts | 7 October 2003 | 18 July 2004 | 285 days |
| 52 | Helen Coonan | Liberal | Howard | Minister for Communications, Information Technology and the Arts | 18 July 2004 | 3 December 2007 | 3 years, 138 days |
| 53 | Stephen Conroy | Labor | Rudd | Minister for Broadband, Communications and the Digital Economy | 3 December 2007 | 24 June 2010 | 5 years, 210 days |
| 53 | Stephen Conroy | Labor | Gillard | Minister for Broadband, Communications and the Digital Economy | 24 June 2010 | 1 July 2013 | 5 years, 210 days |
| 54 | Anthony Albanese | Labor | Rudd | Minister for Broadband, Communications and the Digital Economy | 1 July 2013 | 18 September 2013 | 79 days |
| 55 | Malcolm Turnbull | Liberal | Abbott | Minister for Communications | 18 September 2013 | 14 September 2015 | 2 years, 3 days |
| 55 | Malcolm Turnbull | Liberal | Turnbull | Minister for Communications | 15 September 2015 | 21 September 2015 | 2 years, 3 days |
| 56 | Mitch Fifield | Liberal | Turnbull | Minister for Communications | 21 September 2015 | 23 August 2018 | 3 years, 250 days |
| 56 | Mitch Fifield | Liberal | Morrison | Minister for Communications and the Arts | 28 August 2018 | 29 May 2019 | 3 years, 250 days |
| 57 | Paul Fletcher | Liberal | Morrison | Minister for Communications, Cyber Safety and the Arts | 29 May 2019 | 22 December 2020 | 2 years, 359 days |
| 57 | Paul Fletcher | Liberal | Morrison | Minister for Communications, Urban Infrastructure, Cities and the Arts | 22 December 2020 | 23 May 2022 | 2 years, 359 days |
| 58 | Michelle Rowland | Labor | Albanese | Minister for Communications | 1 June 2022 | 13 May 2025 | 2 years, 346 days |
| 59 | Anika Wells | Labor | Albanese | Minister for Communications | 13 May 2025 | Incumbent | 1 year, 117 days |

Notes

^{1} Barnard served as part of a two-man ministry together with Gough Whitlam for fourteen days, until the full ministry was commissioned.
^{2} On 24 July 1987, the third Hawke ministry implemented a two-level ministerial structure, with distinctions drawn between senior and junior ministers. This arrangement has been continued by subsequent ministries. Junior ministers are shown in the table below.

== Former ministerial portfolios ==
=== List of ministers for regional communications ===
The following individuals have been appointed as Minister for Regional Communications, or any of its precedent titles:

| Order | Minister | Party affiliation | Prime Minister | Ministerial title | Term start | Term end | Term in office |
|---|---|---|---|---|---|---|---|
| 1 | Sharon Bird | Labor | Rudd | Minister for Regional Communications | 1 July 2013 | 18 September 2013 | 79 days |
| 2 | Fiona Nash | National | Turnbull | Minister for Regional Communications | 18 February 2016 | 26 October 2017 | 1 year, 250 days |
| 3 | Bridget McKenzie | National | Turnbull | Minister for Regional Communications | 20 December 2017 | 28 August 2018 | 251 days |
| 4 | Mark Coulton | National | Morrison | Minister for Regional Services, Decentralisation and Local Government | 29 May 2019 | 6 February 2020 | 2 years, 34 days |
| 4 | Mark Coulton | National | Morrison | Minister for Regional Health, Regional Communications and Local Government | 6 February 2020 | 2 July 2021 | 2 years, 34 days |
| (3) | Bridget McKenzie | National | Morrison | Minister for Regionalisation, Regional Communications and Regional Education | 2 July 2021 | 23 May 2022 | 325 days |

=== List of ministers for digital transformation ===
On 24 July 1987, the third Hawke Ministry implemented a two-level ministerial structure, with distinctions drawn between senior and junior ministers. This arrangement has been continued by subsequent ministries; however, junior ministers have been appointed in the telecommunications portfolio on only five occasions. Senior ministers are shown in the table above.

The following individuals have been appointed as the Minister for Digital Transformation, or any of its precedent titles:

| Order | Minister | Party affiliation | Prime Minister | Ministerial title | Term start | Term end | Term in office |
|---|---|---|---|---|---|---|---|
| 1 | Gary Punch | Labor | Hawke | Minister for Telecommunications and Aviation Support | 24 July 1987 | 28 March 1989 | 1 year, 247 days |
| 2 | Ros Kelly | Labor | Hawke | Minister for Telecommunications and Aviation Support | 6 April 1989 | 4 April 1990 | 363 days |
| 3 | David Beddall | Labor | Keating | Minister for Communications | 24 March 1993 | 23 December 1993 | 274 days |
| 4 | Michael Keenan | Liberal | Turnbull | Minister Assisting the Prime Minister for Digital Transformation | 20 December 2017 | 28 August 2018 | 1 year, 160 days |
| 4 | Michael Keenan | Liberal | Morrison | Minister for Digital Transformation | 28 August 2018 | 29 May 2019 | 1 year, 160 days |

== Parliamentary Secretaries ==
The following individuals have been appointed as the Assistant Minister or Parliamentary Secretary for Communications, or any of its precedent titles:

| Order | Secretary | Party affiliation | Prime Minister | Ministerial title | Term start | Term end | Term in office |
|---|---|---|---|---|---|---|---|
| 1 | Ed Husic | Labor | Rudd | Parliamentary Secretary for Broadband | 1 July 2013 | 18 September 2013 | 79 days |
| 2 | Paul Fletcher | Liberal | Abbott | Parliamentary Secretary to the Minister for Communications | 18 September 2013 | 21 September 2015 | 2 years, 3 days |
| 3 | Angus Taylor | Liberal | Turnbull | Assistant Minister to the Prime Minister for Digital Transformation | 18 February 2016 | 20 December 2017 | 1 year, 305 days |
