= Minister for the Arts (Australia) =

Australian cabinet position

- Commonwealth Coat of Arms

- Flag of Australia

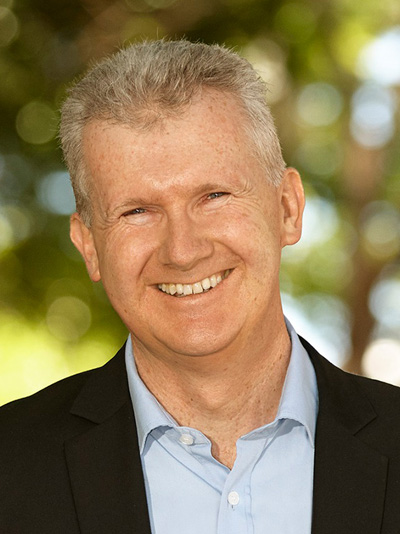
- Incumbent; Tony Burke since 1 June 2022
- Department of Infrastructure, Transport, Regional Development, Communications, Sport and the Arts
- Style: The Honourable
- Appointer: Governor-General on the advice of the prime minister
- Inaugural holder: Peter Howson
- Formation: 10 March 1971
- Website: minister.infrastructure.gov.au/burke

The Minister for the Arts is a position in the Cabinet of Australia responsible for creative industries and culture. It has been held by Tony Burke in the Albanese ministry since 1 June 2022 following the Australian federal election in 2022.

The minister administers the portfolio through the Department of Infrastructure, Transport, Regional Development, Communications, Sport and the Arts.

== List of arts ministers ==
The only minister before Simon Crean to have the title of Minister for the Arts was Bob McMullan between 24 March 1993 and 25 March 1994. However, "Arts" has appeared in several ministerial titles since Peter Howson was appointed Minister for the Environment, Aborigines and the Arts on 10 March 1971. The following individuals have been appointed as Minister for the Arts, or any of its precedent titles:

Order	Minister	Party	Prime Minister	Title	Term start	Term end	Term in office
1	Peter Howson	Liberal	McMahon	Minister for the Environment, Aborigines and the Arts	10 March 1971	5 December 1972	1 year, 270 days
2	Gough Whitlam	Labor	Whitlam	Minister for the Environment, Aborigines and the Arts	5 December 1972	19 December 1972	14 days
3	Tony Staley	Liberal	Fraser	Minister assisting the Prime Minister in matters concerning the Arts	16 August 1976	20 December 1977	1 year, 126 days
4	Barry Cohen	Labor	Hawke	Minister for Arts, Heritage and the Environment	13 December 1984	24 July 1987	2 years, 223 days
5	John Brown	Labor	Hawke	Minister for the Arts, Sport, the Environment, Tourism and Territories	24 July 1987	18 December 1987	147 days
6	Graham Richardson	Labor	Hawke	Minister for the Arts, Sport, the Environment, Tourism and Territories	19 January 1988	4 April 1990	2 years, 75 days
7	Ros Kelly	Labor	Hawke	Minister for the Arts, Sport, the Environment, Tourism and Territories	4 April 1990	27 December 1991	2 years, 354 days
7	Ros Kelly	Labor	Keating	Minister for the Arts, Sport, the Environment and Territories	27 December 1991	24 March 1993	2 years, 354 days
8	Bob McMullan	Labor	Keating	Minister for the Arts and Administrative Services	24 March 1993	30 January 1994	312 days
9	Michael Lee	Labor	Keating	Minister for Communications and the Arts	30 January 1994	11 March 1996	2 years, 41 days
10	Richard Alston	Liberal	Howard	Minister for Communications and the Arts	11 March 1996	9 October 1997	7 years, 210 days
10	Richard Alston	Liberal	Howard	Minister for Communications, the Information Economy and the Arts	9 October 1997	21 October 1998	7 years, 210 days
10	Richard Alston	Liberal	Howard	Minister for Communications, Information Technology and the Arts	21 October 1998	7 October 2003	7 years, 210 days
11	Daryl Williams	Liberal	Howard	Minister for Communications, Information Technology and the Arts	7 October 2003	18 July 2004	285 days
12	Helen Coonan	Liberal	Howard	Minister for Communications, Information Technology and the Arts	18 July 2004	3 December 2007	3 years, 138 days
13	Peter Garrett	Labor	Rudd	Minister for Environment, Heritage and the Arts	3 December 2007	8 March 2010	2 years, 285 days
13	Peter Garrett	Labor	Rudd	Minister for Environment Protection, Heritage and the Arts	8 March 2010	28 June 2010	2 years, 285 days
13	Peter Garrett	Labor	Gillard	Minister for Environment Protection, Heritage and the Arts	28 June 2010	14 September 2010	2 years, 285 days
14	Simon Crean	Labor	Gillard	Minister for the Arts	14 September 2010	25 March 2013	2 years, 192 days
15	Tony Burke	Labor	Gillard	Minister for the Arts	25 March 2013	26 June 2013	177 days
15	Tony Burke	Labor	Rudd	Minister for the Arts	26 June 2013	18 September 2013	177 days
16	George Brandis	Liberal	Abbott	Minister for the Arts	18 September 2013	15 September 2015	2 years, 3 days
16	George Brandis	Liberal	Turnbull	Minister for the Arts	15 September 2015	21 September 2015	2 years, 3 days
17	Mitch Fifield	Liberal	Turnbull	Minister for the Arts	21 September 2015	23 August 2018	3 years, 250 days
17	Mitch Fifield	Liberal	Morrison	Minister for Communications and the Arts	28 August 2018	29 May 2019	3 years, 250 days
18	Paul Fletcher	Liberal	Morrison	Minister for Communications, Cyber Safety and the Arts	29 May 2019	22 December 2020	2 years, 359 days
18	Paul Fletcher	Liberal	Morrison	Minister for Communications, Urban Infrastructure, Cities and the Arts	22 December 2020	23 May 2022	2 years, 359 days
(15)	Tony Burke	Labor	Albanese	Minister for the Arts	1 June 2022	Incumbent	4 years, 98 days

== Former ministerial titles ==
=== List of junior arts ministers ===
Order	Minister	Party	Prime Minister	Title	Term start	Term end	Term in office
1	Gary Punch	Labor	Hawke	Minister for the Arts and Territories	19 January 1988	2 September 1988	227 days
2	Clyde Holding	Labor	Hawke	Minister for the Arts and Territories	2 September 1988	22 May 1989	1 year, 214 days
2	Clyde Holding	Labor	Hawke	Minister for the Arts, Tourism and Territories	22 May 1989	4 April 1990	1 year, 214 days
3	David Simmons	Labor	Hawke	Minister for the Arts, Tourism and Territories	4 April 1990	20 December 1991	1 year, 267 days
3	David Simmons	Labor	Keating	Minister for the Arts, Tourism and Territories	20 December 1991	27 December 1991	1 year, 267 days
4	Wendy Fatin	Labor	Keating	Minister for the Arts and Territories	27 December 1991	24 March 1993	1 year, 87 days
5	Peter McGauran	National	Howard	Minister for the Arts and the Centenary of Federation	21 October 1998	26 November 2001	3 years, 36 days
6	Rod Kemp	Liberal	Howard	Minister for the Arts and Sport	26 November 2001	30 January 2007	5 years, 65 days
7	George Brandis	Liberal	Howard	Minister for the Arts and Sport	30 January 2007	3 December 2007	307 days
