= First Rudd ministry =

64th ministry of government of Australia

- 64th ministry of Australia

- Governor-General Michael Jeffery with first arrangement of newly appointed ministers to the Rudd ministry
- Date formed: 3 December 2007
- Date dissolved: 24 June 2010

People and organisations
- Monarch: Elizabeth II
- Governor-General: Michael Jeffery; Quentin Bryce
- Prime Minister: Kevin Rudd
- Deputy Prime Minister: Julia Gillard
- No. of ministers: 32 (plus 14 Parliamentary Secretaries)
- Member party: Labor
- Status in legislature: Majority government
- Opposition cabinet: Nelson; Turnbull; Abbott
- Opposition party: Liberal–National coalition
- Opposition leader: Brendan Nelson; Malcolm Turnbull; Tony Abbott

History
- Election: 24 November 2007
- Legislature term: 42nd
- Predecessor: Fourth Howard ministry
- Successor: First Gillard ministry

The first Rudd ministry (Labor) was the 64th ministry of the Government of Australia. It was led by the country's 26th Prime Minister, Kevin Rudd. The first Rudd ministry succeeded the fourth Howard ministry, which dissolved on 3 December 2007 following the federal election that took place on 24 November which saw Labor defeat John Howard's Liberal–National Coalition. The ministry was replaced by the first Gillard ministry on 24 June 2010 following the resignation of Rudd as Prime Minister after a successful leadership challenge by Julia Gillard.

== Cabinet ==
Party	Minister	Portrait	Portfolio
Labor	Kevin Rudd (1957-) MP for Griffith (1998–2013)		Prime Minister; Leader of the Labor Party
Labor	Julia Gillard (1961–) MP for Lalor (1998–2013)		Deputy Prime Minister; Deputy Leader of the Labor Party; Minister for Education; Minister for Employment and Workplace Relations; Minister for Social Inclusion
Labor	Wayne Swan (1954–) MP for Lilley (1998–2019)		Treasurer
Labor	Chris Evans (1958–) Senator for Western Australia (1993–2013)		Leader of the Government in the Senate; Minister for Immigration and Citizenship
Labor	John Faulkner (1954–) Senator for New South Wales (1989–2015)		Special Minister of State (to 9 June 2009); Cabinet Secretary (to 9 June 2009); Minister for Defence (from 9 June 2009); Vice-President of the Executive Council
Labor	Simon Crean (1949–2023) MP for Hotham (1990–2013)		Minister for Trade
Labor	Stephen Smith (1955–) MP for Perth (1993–2013)		Minister for Foreign Affairs
Labor	Joel Fitzgibbon (1962–) MP for Hunter (1996–2022)		Minister for Defence (to 9 June 2009)
Labor	Nicola Roxon (1967–) MP for Gellibrand (1998–2013)		Minister for Health and Ageing
Labor	Jenny Macklin (1953–) MP for Jagajaga (1996–2019)		Minister for Families, Housing, Community Services and Indigenous Affairs
Labor	Lindsay Tanner (1956–) MP for Melbourne (1993–2010)		Minister for Finance and Deregulation
Labor	Anthony Albanese (1963–) MP for Grayndler (1996–)		Minister for Infrastructure, Transport, Regional Development and Local Government; Leader of the House
Labor	Stephen Conroy (1963–) Senator for Victoria (1996–2016)		Minister for Broadband, Communications and the Digital Economy
Labor	Kim Carr (1955–) Senator for Victoria (1993–2022)		Minister for Innovation, Industry, Science and Research
Labor	Penny Wong (1968–) Senator for South Australia (2002–)		Minister for Climate Change and Water (to 8 March 2010); Minister for Climate Change, Energy Efficiency and Water (from 8 March 2010)
Labor	Peter Garrett (1953–) MP for Kingsford Smith (2004–2013)		Minister for the Environment, Heritage and the Arts (to 8 March 2010); Minister for the Environment Protection, Heritage and the Arts (from 8 March 2010)
Labor	Robert McClelland (1958–) MP for Barton (1996–2013)		Attorney-General
Labor	Joe Ludwig (1959–) Senator for Queensland (1999–2016)		Minister for Human Services (to 9 June 2009); Special Minister of State (from 9 June 2009); Cabinet Secretary (from 9 June 2009); Manager of Government Business in the Senate
Labor	Tony Burke (1969–) MP for Watson (2004–)		Minister for Agriculture, Fisheries and Forestry; Minister for Population (from 14 April 2010)
Labor	Martin Ferguson (1953–) MP for Batman (1996–2013)		Minister for Resources and Energy; Minister for Tourism
Labor	Chris Bowen (1973–) MP for Prospect (2004–2010) (in Cabinet from 9 June 2009)		Assistant Treasurer (to 9 June 2009); Minister for Competition Policy and Consumer Affairs (to 9 June 2009); Minister for Human Services (from 9 June 2009); Minister for Financial Services, Superannuation and Corporate Law (from 9 June 2009)

== Outer ministry ==
Party	Minister	Portrait	Portfolio
Labor	Bob Debus (1943–) MP for Macquarie (2007–2010)		Minister for Home Affairs (to 9 June 2009)
Labor	Alan Griffin (1960–) MP for Bruce (1996–2016)		Minister for Veterans' Affairs; Minister for Defence Personnel (from 1 April 2010)
Labor	Tanya Plibersek (1969–) MP for Sydney (1998–)		Minister for Housing; Minister for the Status of Women
Labor	Brendan O'Connor (1962–) MP for Gorton (2004–)		Minister for Employment Participation (to 9 June 2009); Minister for Home Affairs (from 9 June 2009)
Labor	Warren Snowdon (1950–) MP for Lingiari (2001–2022)		Minister for Defence Science and Personnel (to 9 June 2009); Minister for Indigenous Health, Rural and Regional Health and Regional Service Delivery (from 9 June 2009)
Labor	Craig Emerson (1954–) MP for Rankin (1998–2013)		Minister for Small Business, Independent Contractors and the Service Economy; Minister assisting the Finance Minister on Deregulation; Minister for Competition Policy and Consumer Affairs (from 9 June 2009)
Labor	Nick Sherry (1955–) Senator for Tasmania (1990–2012)		Minister for Superannuation and Corporate Law (to 9 June 2009); Assistant Treasurer (from 9 June 2009)
Labor	Justine Elliot (1967–) MP for Richmond (2004–)		Minister for Ageing
Labor	Kate Ellis (1977–) MP for Adelaide (2004–2019)		Minister for Sport; Minister for Youth (to 9 June 2009); Minister for Early Childhood Education, Childcare and Youth (from 9 June 2009)
Labor	Greg Combet (1958–) MP for Charlton (2007–2013) (in Ministry from 9 June 2009)		Parliamentary Secretary for Defence Procurement (to 25 February 2009); Parliamentary Secretary for Climate Change (from 25 February 2009 to 9 June 2009); Minister assisting the Minister for Climate Change (from 9 June 2009 to 8 March 2010); Minister for Defence Personnel, Materiel and Science (from 9 June 2009 to 1 April 2010); Minister assisting the Minister for Climate Change and Energy Efficiency (from 8 March 2010); Minister for Defence Materiel and Science (from 1 April 2010)
Labor	Mark Arbib (1971–) Senator for New South Wales (2008–2012) (in Ministry from 9 June 2009)		Parliamentary Secretary for Government Service Delivery (from 25 February 2009 to 9 June 2009); Minister for Employment Participation (from 9 June 2009); Minister assisting the Prime Minister on Government Service Delivery (from 9 June 2009)

== Parliamentary Secretaries ==
Party	Minister	Portrait	Portfolio
Labor	Maxine McKew (1953–) MP for Bennelong (2007–2010)		Parliamentary Secretary for Early Childhood Education and Child Care (to 9 June 2009); Parliamentary Secretary for Infrastructure, Transport, Regional Development and Local Government (from 9 June 2009)
Labor	Dr Mike Kelly (1960–) MP for Eden-Monaro (2007–2013)		Parliamentary Secretary to the Minister for Defence (to 6 February 2008); Parliamentary Secretary for Defence Support (from 6 February 2008); Parliamentary Secretary for Water (from 25 February 2009)
Labor	Gary Gray (1958–) MP for Brand (2007–2016)		Parliamentary Secretary for Regional Development and Northern Australia (to 9 June 2009); Parliamentary Secretary for Western and Northern Australia (from 9 June 2009)
Labor	Bill Shorten (1967–) MP for Maribyrnong (2007–2025)		Parliamentary Secretary for Disabilities and Children's Services; Parliamentary Secretary for Victorian Bushfire Reconstruction (from 25 February 2009)
Labor	Bob McMullan (1947–) MP for Fraser (1998–2010)		Parliamentary Secretary for International Development Assistance
Labor	Duncan Kerr SC (1952–) MP for Denison (1987–2010)		Parliamentary Secretary for Pacific Island Affairs (to 14 December 2009)
Labor	Anthony Byrne (1962–) MP for Holt (1999–2022)		Parliamentary Secretary to the Prime Minister; Parliamentary Secretary for Trade (from 25 February 2009)
Labor	Dr Ursula Stephens (1954–) Senator for New South Wales (2002–2014)		Parliamentary Secretary for Social Inclusion; Parliamentary Secretary for the Voluntary Sector; Parliamentary Secretary assisting the Prime Minister for Social Inclusion (to 9 June 2009)
Labor	John Murphy (1950–) MP for Lowe (1998–2010)		Parliamentary Secretary to the Minister for Trade (from 25 February 2009)
Labor	Jan McLucas (1958–) Senator for Queensland (1999–2016)		Parliamentary Secretary to the Minister for Health and Ageing (to 9 June 2009)
Labor	Laurie Ferguson (1952–) MP for Reid (1990–2010)		Parliamentary Secretary for Multicultural Affairs and Settlement Services
Labor	Jason Clare (1972–) MP for Blaxland (2007–)		Parliamentary Secretary for Employment (from 9 June 2009)
Labor	Mark Butler (1970–) MP for Port Adelaide (2007–2019)		Parliamentary Secretary for Health (from 9 June 2009)
Labor	Richard Marles (1967–) MP for Corio (2007–)		Parliamentary Secretary for Innovation and Industry (from 9 June 2009)

== Changes to the Ministry ==
=== Changes from Rudd shadow ministry ===
Prior to Labor's election to government, in line with long-standing parliamentary convention, Rudd led a shadow cabinet consisting of opposition spokespeople on a range of portfolios. Following the election, some changes were made to this configuration before the Ministry was sworn in.

Peter Garrett was sworn in as Minister for the Environment, Heritage and the Arts, but his shadow portfolio had included Climate Change and Water, which went to Senator Penny Wong. Three previous shadow ministers — Arch Bevis, Kate Lundy and Kerry O'Brien — were relegated to the back bench, while three others — Jan McLucas, Laurie Ferguson and Bob McMullan — were only sworn in as parliamentary secretaries.

Some portfolio responsibilities changed due to Julia Gillard's appointment as Minister for Education. Tanya Plibersek's responsibilities were reduced, with Human Services transferring to Joe Ludwig, the shadow Attorney-General. Robert McClelland became Attorney-General, while Stephen Smith became Minister for Foreign Affairs in lieu of Education.

While the former Shadow Minister for Finance Lindsay Tanner retained his portfolio, the ministry and department underwent a name change to Finance and Deregulation.

=== February 2009 changes ===
On 25 February 2009, Prime Minister Kevin Rudd announced a reshuffle of his Parliamentary Secretaries (the lowest ministerial rank), following the resignation of John Murphy. The reshuffle also saw the appointment of Senator Mark Arbib as Parliamentary Secretary for Government Service Delivery. Bill Shorten added Victorian Bushfire Reconstruction to his responsibilities of Disabilities and Children's Services.

=== June 2009 reshuffle ===
On 9 June 2009, a significant reshuffle of the ministry took place. It was prompted by Defence Minister Joel Fitzgibbon's resignation from cabinet after a series of embarrassing events and revelations harmed his reputation, along with a generally held view that his relationship with his department had irretrievably broken down. The changes were announced by Rudd on 5 June 2009. Labor veteran Senator John Faulkner, previously Special Minister for State and responsible for the government's electoral reform package, was appointed to the role. He was the first person from the Left faction of the ALP to hold the position since World War II. Other changes of note included the elevation of Greg Combet and Senator Mark Arbib from parliamentary secretaries to the Outer Ministry, and Bob Debus's retirement from the ministry. The new ministers were all sworn in on 9 June.

=== Other changes ===
On 14 December 2009, Duncan Kerr's appointment as Parliamentary Secretary for International Development Assistance was terminated following his announcement that he would retire at the next election.

On 8 March 2010, Peter Garrett's title was changed from Minister for Environment, Heritage and the Arts to Minister for Environment Protection, Heritage and the Arts. This was in response to the perceived mishandling of one of the government's stimulus programs. Several of Garrett's environmental responsibilities were transferred to Senator Penny Wong, whose title changed from Minister for Climate Change and Water to Minister for Climate Change, Energy Efficiency and Water.

On 1 April 2010 Greg Combet became Minister for Defence Materiel and Science (losing "personnel") and Minister Assisting the Minister for Climate Change and Energy Efficiency and Alan Griffin added Minister for Defence Personnel to his position as Minister for Veterans' Affairs.

On 14 April 2010 Tony Burke was appointed the inaugural Minister for Population.

== See also ==
- Second Rudd ministry
