= Turnbull shadow ministry =

Shadow ministry of Australia (2008–2009)

The Shadow Ministry of Malcolm Turnbull was the opposition Coalition shadow ministry of Australia from September 2008 to December 2009, opposing Kevin Rudd's Australian Labor Party ministry.

The Shadow Cabinet of Australia (also known as the Opposition Front Bench) is a group of senior Opposition spokespeople who form an alternative cabinet to the government's, whose members "shadow" or "mark" each individual member of the government. Malcolm Turnbull defeated Brendan Nelson in the Liberal Party's 2008 leadership spill 45 votes to 41, making Turnbull Opposition Leader. Turnbull announced his Shadow Cabinet on 22 September 2008. It was reshuffled on 16 February when Julie Bishop stepped down from the role of Shadow Treasury. The Shadow Cabinet of Malcolm Turnbull was replaced by the Shadow Cabinet of Tony Abbott in December 2009 following the 2009 Liberal Party leadership spill.

== Members of the Shadow Cabinet (2008–2009) ==
Colour key
(for political parties)
Liberal
National

Shadow Minister	Portfolio
Malcolm Turnbull MP	Leader of the Opposition
Julie Bishop MP	Deputy Leader of the Opposition; Shadow Treasurer (22 September 2008 – 16 February 2009); Shadow Minister for Foreign Affairs (From 16 February 2009)
Senator Nick Minchin^{1}	Leader of the Opposition in the Senate; Shadow Minister for Broadband, Communications and the Digital Economy
Senator Eric Abetz^{1}	Deputy Leader of the Opposition in the Senate; Shadow Minister for Innovation, Industry, Science and Research
Warren Truss MP	Leader of the Nationals; Shadow Minister for Trade, Transport, Regional Development and Local Government
Senator Nigel Scullion	Deputy Leader of the Nationals; Leader of The Nationals in the Senate (To 17 November 2008); Shadow Minister for Human Services
Christopher Pyne MP	Manager of Opposition Business in the House (From 16 February 2009); Shadow Minister for Education, Apprenticeships and Training
Joe Hockey MP	Manager of Opposition Business in the House (To 16 February 2009); Shadow Minister for Finance, Competition Policy and Deregulation (To 16 February 2009); Shadow Treasurer (From 16 February 2009)
Senator Helen Coonan	Manager of Opposition Business in the Senate (To 16 February 2009); Shadow Minister for Foreign Affairs (To 16 February 2009); Shadow Minister for Finance, Competition Policy and Deregulation (From 16 February 2009)
Andrew Robb AO MP	Shadow Minister for Infrastructure and COAG; Shadow Minister Assisting the Leader on Emissions Trading Design
Ian Macfarlane MP	Shadow Minister for Energy and Resources
Tony Abbott MP^{1}	Shadow Minister for Families, Housing, Community Services and Indigenous Affairs
Michael Ronaldson MP	Shadow Special Minister of State; Shadow Cabinet Secretary
Greg Hunt MP	Shadow Minister for Climate Change, Environment and Water
Peter Dutton MP	Shadow Minister for Health and Ageing
Senator David Johnston	Shadow Minister for Defence
Senator George Brandis SC	Shadow Attorney-General
John Cobb MP	Shadow Minister for Agriculture, Fisheries and Forestry
Michael Keenan MP	Shadow Minister for Employment and Workplace Relations
Sharman Stone MP	Shadow Minister for Immigration and Citizenship
Steven Ciobo MP	Shadow Minister for Small Business, Independent Contractors, Tourism and the Arts

^{1} Tony Abbott, Nick Minchin and Eric Abetz quit the Coalition front bench on 26 November 2009.

== Members of the Outer Shadow Ministry (2008–2009) ==
Shadow Minister	Portfolio
Luke Hartsuyker MP	Deputy Manager of Opposition Business in the House; Shadow Minister for Competition Policy and Consumer Affairs
Chris Pearce MP	Shadow Minister for Financial Services, Superannuation and Corporate Law
Tony Smith MP	Shadow Assistant Treasurer
Bruce Billson MP	Shadow Minister for Sustainable Development and Cities
Scott Morrison MP	Shadow Minister for Housing and Local Government
Margaret May MP	Shadow Minister for Ageing
Bob Baldwin MP	Shadow Minister for Defence Science and Personnel
Louise Markus MP	Shadow Minister for Veterans' Affairs
Sophie Mirabella MP	Shadow Minister for Early Childhood Education, Childcare, Women and Youth
Sussan Ley MP	Shadow Minister for Justice and Customs
Andrew Southcott MP	Shadow Minister for Employment Participation, Training and Sport

== Shadow Parliamentary Secretaries (2008–2009) ==
Shadow Minister	Portfolio
Senator Ian Macdonald	Shadow Minister for Northern Australia
Barry Haase MP	Shadow Parliamentary Secretary for Energy and Resources (From 23 January 2009); Shadow Parliamentary Secretary for Roads and Transport (To 23 January 2009)
John Forrest MP	Shadow Parliamentary Secretary for Regional Development
Senator Marise Payne	Shadow Parliamentary Secretary for International Development Assistance; Shadow Parliamentary Secretary for Indigenous Affairs
Don Randall MP	Shadow Parliamentary Secretary for Roads and Transport (From 23 January 2009); Shadow Parliamentary Secretary for Energy and Resources (To 23 January 2009)
Senator Cory Bernardi	Shadow Parliamentary Secretary for Disabilities, Carers and the Voluntary Sector (To 19 February 2009)
Senator Mitch Fifield	Shadow Parliamentary Secretary for Disabilities, Carers and the Voluntary Sector (From 19 February 2009)
Senator Fiona Nash	Shadow Parliamentary Secretary for Water Resources and Conservation (To 1 December 2008)
Mark Coulton MP	Shadow Parliamentary Secretary for Water Resources and Conservation (From 1 December 2008)
Senator Mathias Cormann	Shadow Parliamentary Secretary for Health Administration
Peter Lindsay MP	Shadow Parliamentary Secretary for Defence
Senator Brett Mason	Shadow Parliamentary Secretary for Education
Jason Wood MP	Shadow Parliamentary Secretary for Justice and Public Security
Senator Richard Colbeck	Shadow Parliamentary Secretary for Agriculture, Fisheries and Forestry
Senator Concetta Fierravanti-Wells	Shadow Parliamentary Secretary for Immigration; Shadow Parliamentary Secretary Assisting the Leader in the Senate

== See also ==
- First Rudd Ministry
