= Louise Hand =

Australian diplomat

Louise Hand PSM
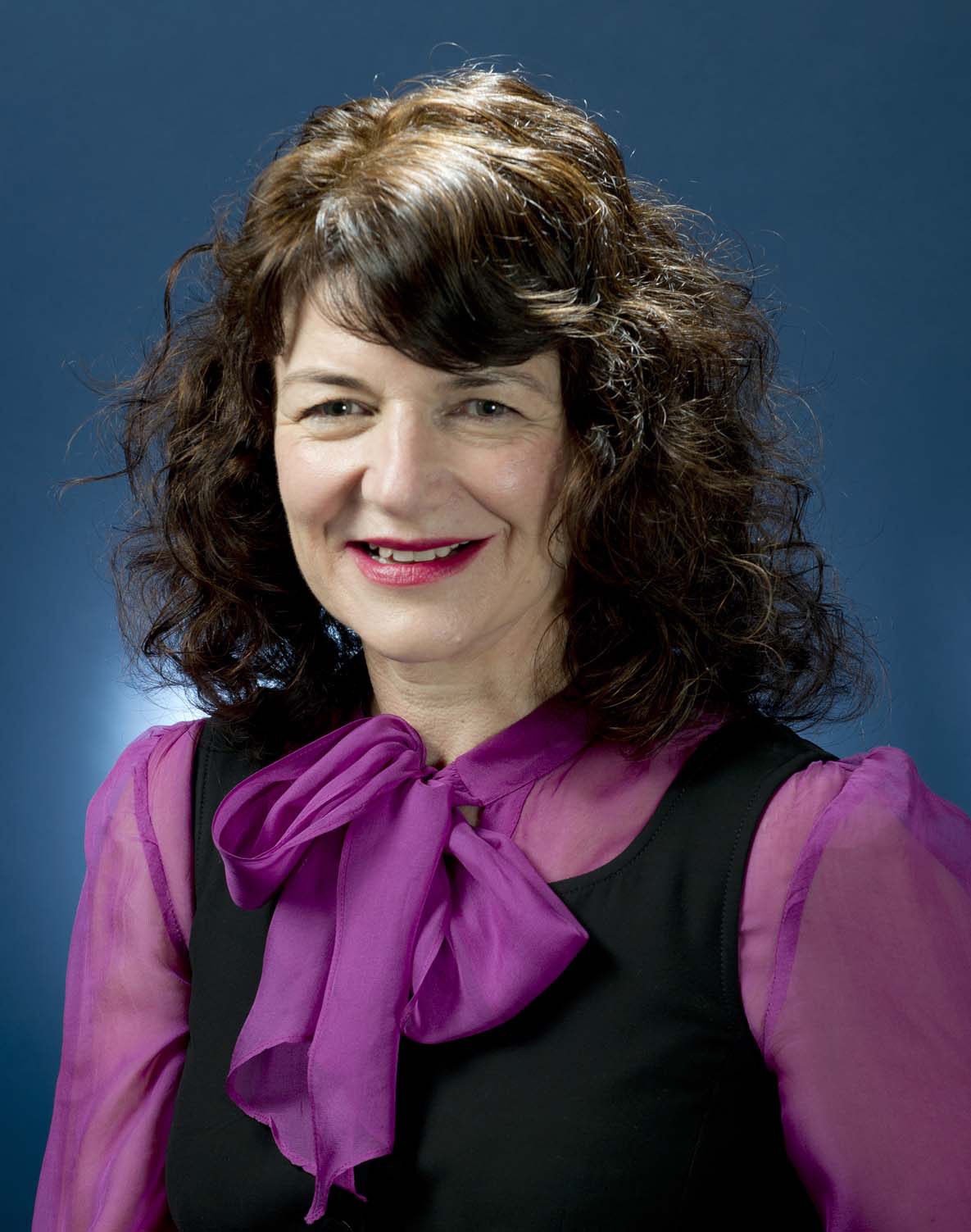
- Born: Louise Helen Hand
- Education: University of Queensland; Deakin University
- Occupations: Public servant and diplomat
- Children: Two

Louise Helen Hand PSM is an Australian diplomat and is a senior career officer with the Department of Foreign Affairs and Trade.

On 29 December 2011, the Acting Minister for Foreign Affairs, Martin Ferguson appointed Hand as the Australian High Commissioner to Canada, and she served in the role until January 2015.

Prior to her Canadian appointment, Hand had been seconded to the Department of Climate Change as the Ambassador for Climate Change (2009–2011), acting as the lead Australian negotiator within the United Nations Framework Convention on Climate Change, and as head of the International Division in the department.

Hand has served overseas as Minister and Deputy Head of Mission at the Australian Embassy, Jakarta (2005 to 2009), Ambassador to Cambodia (2000 to 2003), Counselor, Australian Permanent Mission on Disarmament, Geneva (1995 to 1998), and Third later Second Secretary, Australian Embassy, Vienna (1986 to 1989).

In Canberra, Hand has held the positions of First Assistant Secretary, Europe Division (2015–2017), Assistant Secretary, Arms Control Branch (1999 to 2000), Director, Ministerial and Executive Liaison Section (1999), Director, Business Affairs Unit (1993 to 1994) and Advisor to the Secretary (1992 to 1993).

Hand studied for a Bachelor of Arts and a master's qualifying degree from the University of Queensland and she holds an MBA from Deakin University. She is married to Minik Rosing and has two daughters, Adela and Olivia.

In January 2009, she was awarded a Public Service Medal for her work in Indonesia.

Diplomatic posts
Preceded by Malcolm Leader	Australian Ambassador to Cambodia; 2000–2003	Succeeded by Annabel Anderson
Preceded by Justin Brown	Australian High Commissioner to Canada; 2011–2015	Succeeded by Tony Negus
