= Andrew Colvin =

Australian police officer

Andrew Colvin AO APM
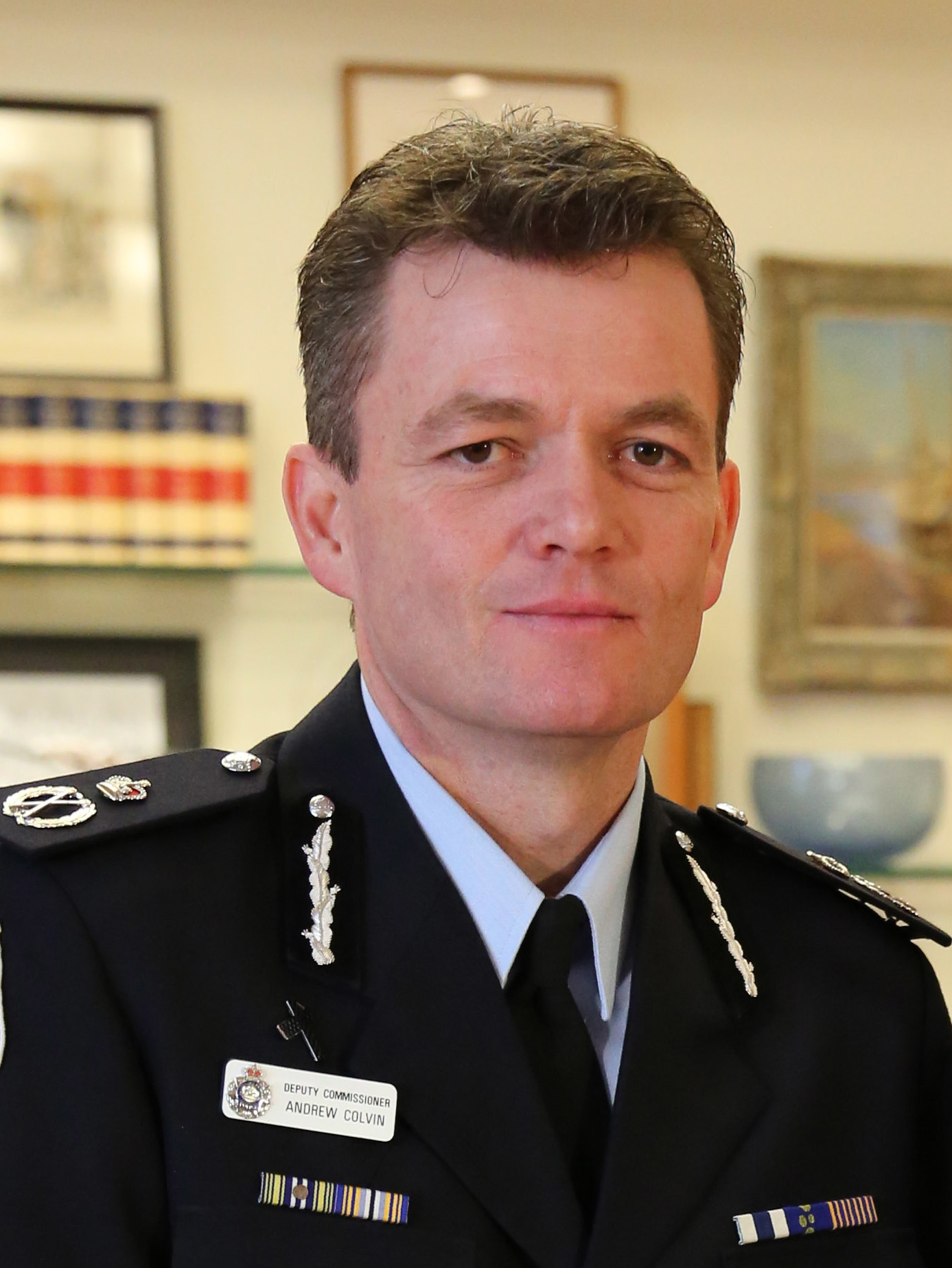
- Andrew Colvin in October 2014
- Education: John F. Kennedy School of Government, Harvard University
- Notable work: 2002 Bali bombings; Australian Embassy bombings in Jakarta
- Police career
- Commissioner: Australian Federal Police
- Service years: 1990–2019
- Other work: National Bushfire Recovery Agency

Andrew Colvin AO APM is an Australian police officer who was the Commissioner of the Australian Federal Police from September 2014 to September 2019. On 5 January 2020, Colvin was appointed to lead the newly established National Bushfire Recovery Agency. In June 2024, Colvin was appointed as the Chief Executive Officer of Australian Red Cross, an organisation with a rich history of making a positive impact on people’s lives.

== Early life and education ==
Between July 2009 and May 2010 he studied for and received a master's degree in Public Administration from Harvard University's John F. Kennedy School of Government.

== Career ==
Colvin joined the Australian Federal Police in 1990 and has worked in policing narcotics, money laundering, politically motivated crime, illegal pornography and terrorism financing. He oversaw Australia's policing response to the 2002 Bali bombings, for which he was awarded the Medal of the Order of Australia (OAM), upgraded to the AO in 2022 in 2003, and the Australian Embassy bombings in Jakarta.

In 2008 Colvin was awarded the Australian Police Medal (APM).

He replaced Commissioner Tony Negus as head of the AFP in September 2014 and chose not to seek a contract extension and stepped down from the role in September 2019.

=== Career chronology ===
- 1990: Joined Australian Federal Police
- 2002: Superintendent, National Coordinator Counter Terrorism
- 2003: Medal of the Order of Australia (OAM)
- 2005: Chief of Staff
- 2006: Assistant Commissioner
- 2007: Street Review
- 2008: National Manager High Tech Crime Operations
- 2008: Australian Police Medal (APM)
- 2010: Masters in Public Administration
- 2010: Deputy Commissioner Operations
- 2014: Appointed Commissioner
- 2019: Stepped down as Commissioner
- 2022: Promoted to Officer of the Order of Australia (AO) in the 2022 Australia Day Honours for "distinguished service to law enforcement, to counter terrorism initiatives, and to bushfire recovery programs".

== Personal life ==
Andrew Colvin is married with two children.

Police appointments
Preceded by Tony Negus	Commissioner of the Australian Federal Police; 2014 – 2019	Succeeded by Reece Kershaw
