= Scott Ryan (Australian politician) =

Australian politician (born 1973)

The Honourable Scott Ryan
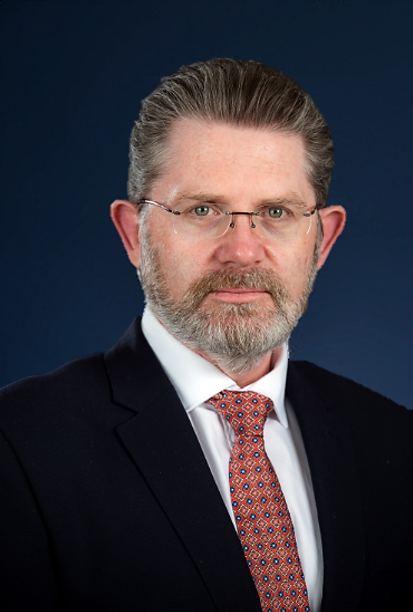
- Official portrait, 2021

26th High Commissioner of Australia to Canada
- In office 20 December 2021 – December 2024
- Prime Minister: Scott Morrison; Anthony Albanese
- Preceded by: Natasha Smith
- Succeeded by: Kate Logan

25th President of the Australian Senate
- In office 13 November 2017 – 13 October 2021
- Deputy: Sue Lines
- Preceded by: Stephen Parry
- Succeeded by: Slade Brockman

Special Minister of State
- In office 19 July 2016 – 13 November 2017
- Preceded by: Mathias Cormann
- Succeeded by: Mathias Cormann (acting)

Minister Assisting the Prime Minister for Cabinet
- In office 24 January 2017 – 13 November 2017
- Prime Minister: Malcolm Turnbull
- Preceded by: Himself (as Minister Assisting the Cabinet Secretary)

Minister Assisting the Cabinet Secretary
- In office 15 September 2015 – 24 January 2017
- Prime Minister: Malcolm Turnbull
- Preceded by: New title
- Succeeded by: Himself (as Minister Assisting the Prime Minister for Cabinet)

Minister for Vocational Education and Skills
- In office 18 February 2016 – 19 July 2016
- Prime Minister: Malcolm Turnbull
- Preceded by: Luke Hartsuyker
- Succeeded by: Karen Andrews (as Assistant Minister for Vocational Education and Skills)

Senator for Victoria
- In office 1 July 2008 – 13 October 2021
- Succeeded by: Greg Mirabella

Personal details
- Born: Scott Michael Ryan; 12 May 1973 (age 53) Brisbane, Queensland, Australia
- Party: Liberal
- Education: University of Melbourne
- Website: scottryan.com.au

Scott Michael Ryan (born 12 May 1973) is a former Australian politician and diplomat. He was a Senator for Victoria from 2008 to 2021, representing the Liberal Party of Australia. He was a minister in the Turnbull government from 2016 to 2017 and later served as President of the Senate from 2017 to 2021. He resigned from the Senate to become high commissioner of Australia to Canada, serving from 2021 to 2024. He accepted an appointment as national executive director of the National Catholic Education Commission and took up the appointment on 19 January 2026.

== Early life ==
Ryan was born on 12 May 1973, in Brisbane, Queensland. He grew up in Essendon, Victoria. He was educated at St Kevin's College, Melbourne, and graduated from the University of Melbourne, with a Bachelor of Arts. While at university, he served as president of the Melbourne University Liberal Club and was a member of the Australian Liberal Students' Federation, of which he is a life member.

Ryan was a tutor in political science at the University of Melbourne from 1998 to 1999. He then worked as a speechwriter and staffer in the office of the Victorian opposition leader Denis Napthine. From 2002 to 2007 he worked in corporate affairs for pharmaceutical company GlaxoSmithKline. He was a research fellow at the Institute of Public Affairs from 2007 to 2008.

== Politics ==
Ryan was a member of the executive of the Victorian Division of the Liberal Party, holding the office of vice president. He was elected to a six-year Senate term at the 2007 federal election, commencing on 1 July 2008. He was preselected in the third position on the Coalition ticket in Victoria. He was re-elected to a second six-year term at the 2013 election, which was cut short by a double dissolution. Ryan was re-elected at the 2016 Australian federal election.

The first sitting of the 2016–2019 Senate allocated which senators were elected for only three years and which received a full six-year term, and there was debate over which of two methods should be used to decide this. As a consequence of the method chosen, Ryan was one of the two senators (the other being Labor's Deborah O'Neill) who received a six-year term, when they would have had a three-year term under the alternative method.

=== Government minister ===
Following the 2013 federal election that resulted in the formation of the Abbott Ministry, Ryan was appointed as the Parliamentary Secretary to the Minister for Education; later expanded as the Parliamentary Secretary to the Minister for Education and Training. Ryan served as the Minister for Vocational Education and Skills following a rearrangement in the First Turnbull Ministry, between February and July 2016. In March 2016, he stated his opposition to a federal takeover of vocational education from the states. Ryan was appointed the Special Minister for State in the first arrangement of the Second Turnbull ministry and gained additional responsibilities as the Minister Assisting the Prime Minister for Cabinet in a subsequent rearrangement.

Ryan took extended leave for medical reasons in July 2017, following an illness that required admission to intensive care.

=== President of the Senate ===
On 13 November 2017, Ryan was elected President of the Senate, winning by 53 votes to 11 for Senator Peter Whish-Wilson of the Greens. He resigned his ministerial posts to take up the position. His predecessor Stephen Parry resigned from the Senate during the parliamentary eligibility crisis, after discovering he was a dual citizen of the United Kingdom. Ryan is the first former government minister to become President of the Senate since Doug McClelland (1983–1987), and the first person to resign from the ministry to take up the position. He took office at the age of 44, surpassing Kerry Sibraa (who was 49) as the youngest person to assume the presidency.

Ryan stated that he would continue to sit in the Liberal party room during his presidency but would not participate in debate. Following the 2019 election, he was re-elected to the presidency on 2 July 2019. According to the Guardian Australia, he was "well regarded on both sides of the chamber". In August 2020, during the COVID-19 pandemic, he criticised the quarantine regimes of the state and territory governments as an infringement on the rights of parliamentarians.

In March 2020, Ryan announced he would retire from federal parliament at the 2022 federal election, citing his unwillingness to serve another six-year term and that "constant renewal is essential for every political party". He initially committed to remaining as president until the end of his Senate term in 2022, but on 24 September 2021 announced his intention to resign from the Senate before parliament sat on 18 October 2021. He officially resigned on 13 October 2021.

== High Commissioner ==
On 20 December 2021, Senator and Foreign Affairs Minister Marise Payne announced Ryan's appointment as High Commissioner to Canada to succeed Natasha Smith.

== Political positions ==
Ryan described himself in 2018 as "very liberal in my political outlook" but with a conservative disposition. He was aligned with the faction in the Victorian Liberals associated with Peter Costello and Michael Kroger. After the Liberal candidate Dave Sharma was defeated by Independent Kerryn Phelps at the 2018 Wentworth by-election, he called for the party to maintain its ideological diversity.

== Personal life ==
Ryan has two sons with his wife Helen and lives in Melbourne.

Political offices
| Preceded by Luke Hartsuyker | Minister for Vocational Education and Skills; 2016 | Succeeded by Karen Andrews as Assistant Minister for Vocational Education and Skills |
| Preceded by Mathias Cormann | Special Minister of State; 2016–2017 | Succeeded by Mathias Cormann (acting) |
Parliament of Australia
| Preceded by Stephen Parry | President of the Senate; 2017–2021 | Succeeded by Slade Brockman |
Diplomatic posts
| Preceded by Natasha Smith | Australian High Commissioner to Canada; 2021–2024 | Succeeded by Kate Logan |
