= Slade Brockman =

Australian politician

Senator Slade Brockman
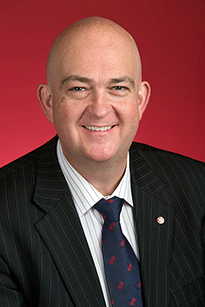

Deputy President of the Australian Senate
- Incumbent
- Assumed office 22 July 2025
- President: Sue Lines
- Preceded by: Andrew McLachlan

President of the Australian Senate
- In office 18 October 2021 – 26 July 2022
- Preceded by: Scott Ryan
- Succeeded by: Sue Lines

Senator for Western Australia
- Incumbent
- Assumed office 16 August 2017
- Preceded by: Chris Back

Personal details
- Born: William Edward Slade Brockman; 27 March 1970 (age 56) Manjimup, Western Australia, Australia
- Party: Liberal Party
- Education: Murdoch University; University of New England

William Edward Slade Brockman (born 27 March 1970) is an Australian politician who has served as a Senator for Western Australia since 2017, representing the Liberal Party. He was elected President of the Australian Senate in October 2021 following the resignation of Scott Ryan.

Prior to his appointment to the Senate, Brockman was an adviser and chief of staff for Senator Mathias Cormann, and a policy director for the Pastoralists and Graziers Association. His policy interests include agriculture, mining, trade, oil and gas, infrastructure and regional development.

== Early life and career ==
Brockman was born in 1970 in Manjimup, Western Australia, and grew up on a family farm in the South West region of Western Australia.

He has a Bachelor of Laws from the University of New England and a first-class Honours Degree in Political History from Murdoch University.

His work background includes running a family farm, management roles in business and working for industry associations.

== Senate ==
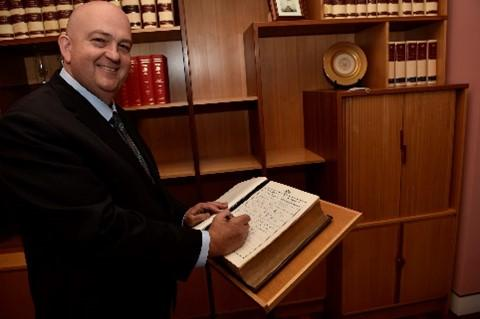
Brockman in 2022

On 16 August 2017, Brockman was appointed as a Senator for Western Australia by a joint sitting of the Parliament of Western Australia to fill the casual vacancy resulting from the resignation of Chris Back.

Brockman is a member of the National Right faction of the Liberal Party.

Brockman has served in a range of parliamentary and committee roles, including as Government Deputy Whip of the Senate, Chair of the Economics Legislation Committee, and Chair of the Select Committee on Multi-Jurisdictional Management and Execution of the Murray Darling Basin Plan.

At the time of the Australian Marriage Law Postal Survey, Brockman said that he would vote against the bill in parliament, in line with his personal beliefs. He voted against the Marriage Amendment (Definition and Religious Freedoms) Bill on 29 November 2017.

=== President of the Senate ===
Following the resignation of Scott Ryan from the role, Brockman was chosen as the Liberal Party's candidate for President of the Senate.

In the ensuing Senate ballot, Brockman stood against Greens Senator Mehreen Faruqi and won the position 45 votes to 7 on 18 October 2021.

Parliament of Australia
| Preceded by Scott Ryan | President of the Australian Senate; 2021–2022 | Succeeded by Sue Lines |
