= Natasha Smith (diplomat) =

Australian diplomat

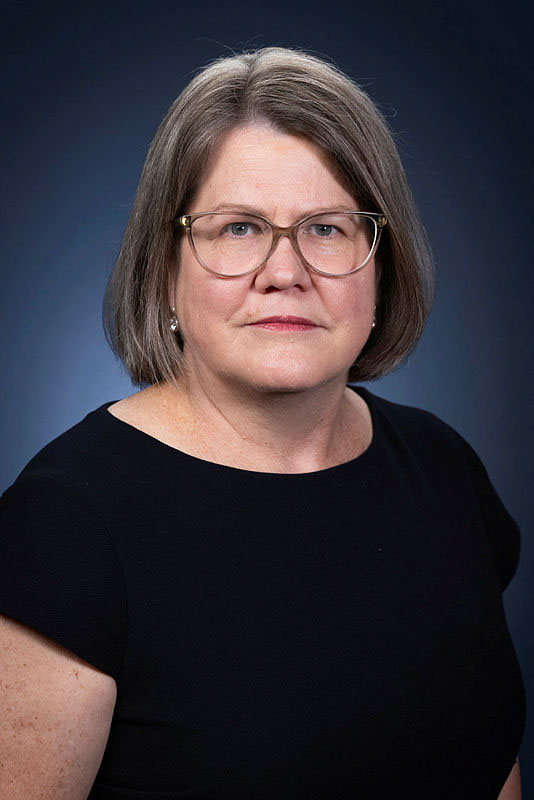
- Smith in 2024

Ambassador of Australia to Germany
- Incumbent
- Assumed office 20 March 2024
- Preceded by: Philip Green

High Commissioner of Australia to Canada
- In office 30 November 2017 – 20 December 2021
- Preceded by: Tony Negus
- Succeeded by: Scott Ryan

Personal details
- Born: Townsville, Queensland
- Education: James Cook University (BEc)

Natasha Smith is an Australian public servant and diplomat. She was the High Commissioner of Australia to Canada, with additional responsibility for the British Overseas Territory of Bermuda, from February 2018 to December 2021. She has been the Ambassador of Australia to Germany since 20 March 2024.

Smith's personal goal as High Commissioner was "championing diversity issues. This includes working with Canadian counterparts on indigenous issues, gender equality and Lesbian, Gay, Bisexual, Transgender and Intersex (LGBTI) rights."

Smith holds a Bachelor of Economics from James Cook University and is a Graduate of the Australian Institute of Company Directors.

Diplomatic posts
Preceded by Tony Negus	High Commissioner of Australia to Canada; 2018–2021	Succeeded by Scott Ryan
Preceded by Philip Green	Ambassador of Australia to Germany; 2024–present	Incumbent
