= Stephen Smith (Australian politician) =

Australian politician

The Honourable Stephen Smith
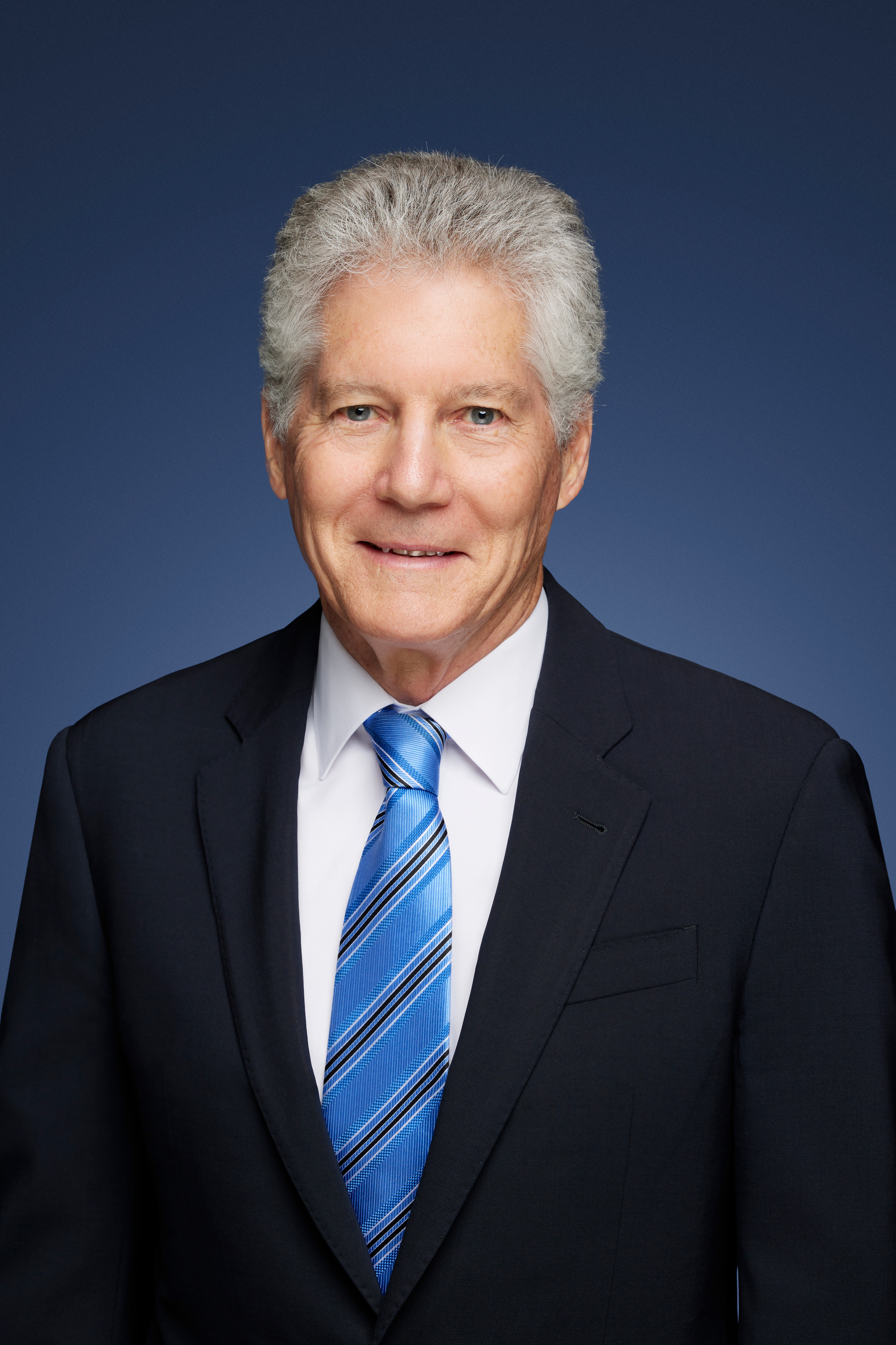
- Official portrait, 2023

High Commissioner of Australia to the United Kingdom
- In office 26 January 2023 – 26 January 2026
- Preceded by: Lynette Wood (Acting); George Brandis
- Succeeded by: Jay Weatherill

Minister for Defence
- In office 14 September 2010 – 18 September 2013
- Prime Minister: Julia Gillard; Kevin Rudd
- Preceded by: John Faulkner
- Succeeded by: David Johnston

Minister for Trade
- In office 28 June 2010 – 14 September 2010
- Prime Minister: Julia Gillard
- Preceded by: Simon Crean
- Succeeded by: Craig Emerson

Minister for Foreign Affairs
- In office 3 December 2007 – 14 September 2010
- Prime Minister: Kevin Rudd; Julia Gillard
- Preceded by: Alexander Downer
- Succeeded by: Kevin Rudd

Member of the Australian Parliament for Perth
- In office 13 March 1993 – 5 August 2013
- Preceded by: Ric Charlesworth
- Succeeded by: Alannah MacTiernan

Personal details
- Born: Stephen Francis Smith; 12 December 1955 (age 70) Narrogin, Western Australia, Australia
- Party: Labor
- Spouse: Jane Seymour
- Children: 2
- Education: University of Western Australia; University of London

Stephen Francis Smith (born 12 December 1955) is an Australian former politician and diplomat who served as the 26th high commissioner of Australia to the United Kingdom from 2023 to 2026. A member of the Australian Labor Party (ALP), he was the federal member of Parliament (MP) for the division of Perth from 1993 to 2013, serving in the Rudd and Gillard governments as minister for Foreign Affairs from 2007 to 2010, minister for Trade in 2010 and minister for Defence from 2010 to 2013.

== Early life ==
Smith was born in Narrogin, Western Australia, and was educated at CBC Highgate, the University of Western Australia and the University of London, where he earned a master's degree in law. He was a solicitor, lecturer and tutor before entering politics.

== Career ==
=== State politics ===
He was Principal Private Secretary to the Western Australian Attorney-General, Joe Berinson 1983–87 and State Secretary of the Western Australian Labor Party 1987–90. He organized the state Labor left and right factions in a leadership spill against premier Peter Dowding in February 1990, replacing him with Carmen Lawrence.

In 2009, following lobbying and representations from the Turkish government, Foreign Minister Stephen Smith attempted to intervene in Fairfield City Council's approval of a memorial commemorating the Assyrian genocide, urging the council to consider the potential diplomatic consequences. The council unanimously approved the memorial despite his intervention.

=== Federal politics ===
From 1990 to 1993 he was an adviser to Paul Keating, first when Keating was treasurer, then when Keating was prime minister. He was instrumental in securing caucus support for Keating to defeat Bob Hawke for the Labor Party leadership in 1991 and thereby allowing Keating to ascend to the prime ministership.

Smith was elected to the Federal House of Representatives as the member for Perth in 1993.

Smith was a member of the Opposition Shadow Ministry from March 1996 until the November 2007 elections, which were won by the Labor party. He was Shadow Minister for Trade 1996–97, for Resources and Energy 1997–98, for Communications 1998–2001, Health and Ageing 2001–03 and Immigration 2003–04. He was Shadow Minister for Industry, Infrastructure and Industrial Relations from October 2004 until December 2006, when he was appointed to the position of Shadow Minister for Education and Training.

Smith formed a strong alliance with Wayne Swan, Anthony Albanese and Senator Stephen Conroy. Smith, Swan and Conroy worked against Simon Crean's leadership from 2001 until 2003, when Crean resigned. During the leadership crisis in the Labor Party in 2003, Smith was a prominent supporter of his fellow Western Australian, Kim Beazley, which saw Mark Latham defeat Beazley by two votes. As early as 2002 his name had been mentioned as a possible future leader. He again supported Beazley in the leadership contest which followed the resignation of Mark Latham in January 2005, which saw Beazley return to the leadership.

Smith was appointed Minister for Foreign Affairs in Kevin Rudd's cabinet on 3 December following Labor's win in the 2007 election, and when Julia Gillard took over from Kevin Rudd as prime minister in June 2010, she added Minister for Trade to Smith's portfolio. After the 2010 federal election Smith was appointed to the vacant Defence portfolio, while Rudd and Craig Emerson were appointed to the Foreign Affairs and Trade ministries, respectively.

Following Kevin Rudd's return to the leadership of the ALP and as prime minister, on 27 June 2013 Smith announced he would not be a candidate at the 2013 federal election.

== Post-parliamentary career ==
Smith was appointed Winthrop Professor of International Law at the University of Western Australia on 29 April 2014.

In March 2016, Smith announced that he did not believe the leader of the Labor Party in Western Australia, Mark McGowan, was capable of leading the party to victory at the 2017 state election. He sought to enter the Western Australian Legislative Assembly by seeking preselection in the new seat of Baldivis. His bid for preselection was unsuccessful, and McGowan led WA Labor to a landslide victory in the 2017 election.

Smith served as Chairman of ASX listed Canberra-based cyber security firm archTIS from March 2018 to July 2020.

In August 2022, Smith was appointed to co-lead the Defence Strategic Review into the Australian Defence Force by Prime Minister Anthony Albanese. On 30 September 2022, Smith was named as the next High Commissioner of Australia to the United Kingdom, to take up office on 26 January 2023 following the completion of the Defence Strategic Review.

== Photo gallery ==
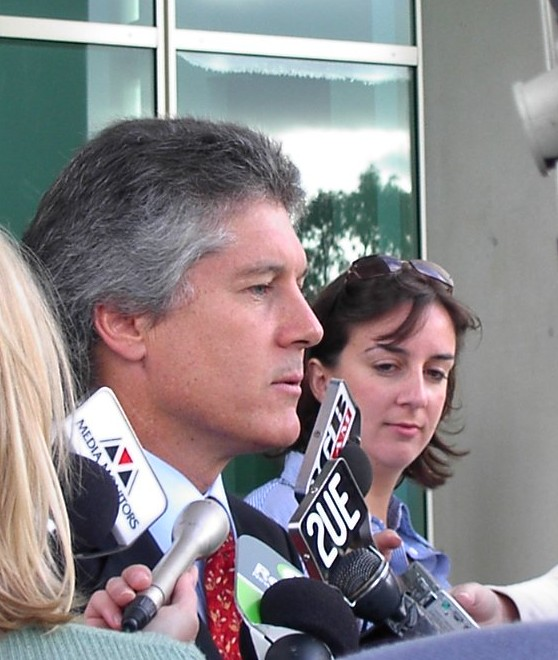
Stephen Smith in early 2005

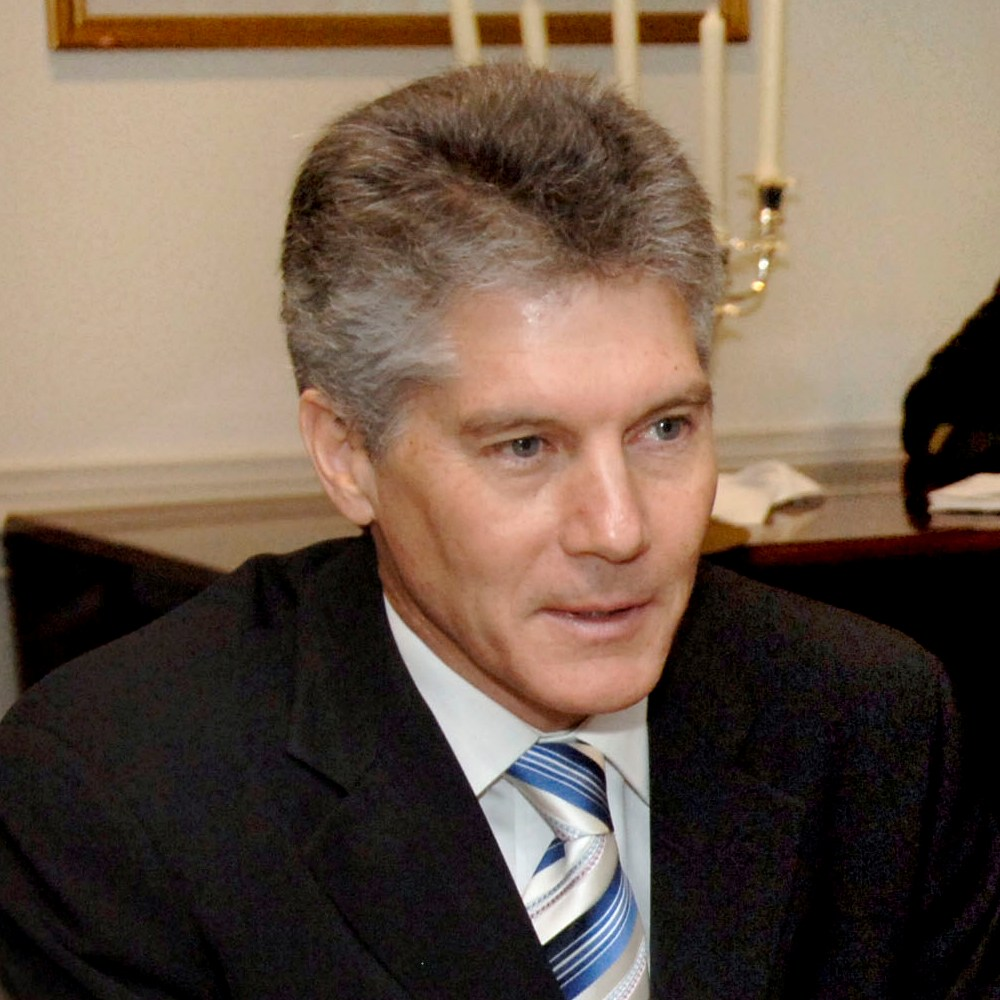
Stephen Smith in early 2008

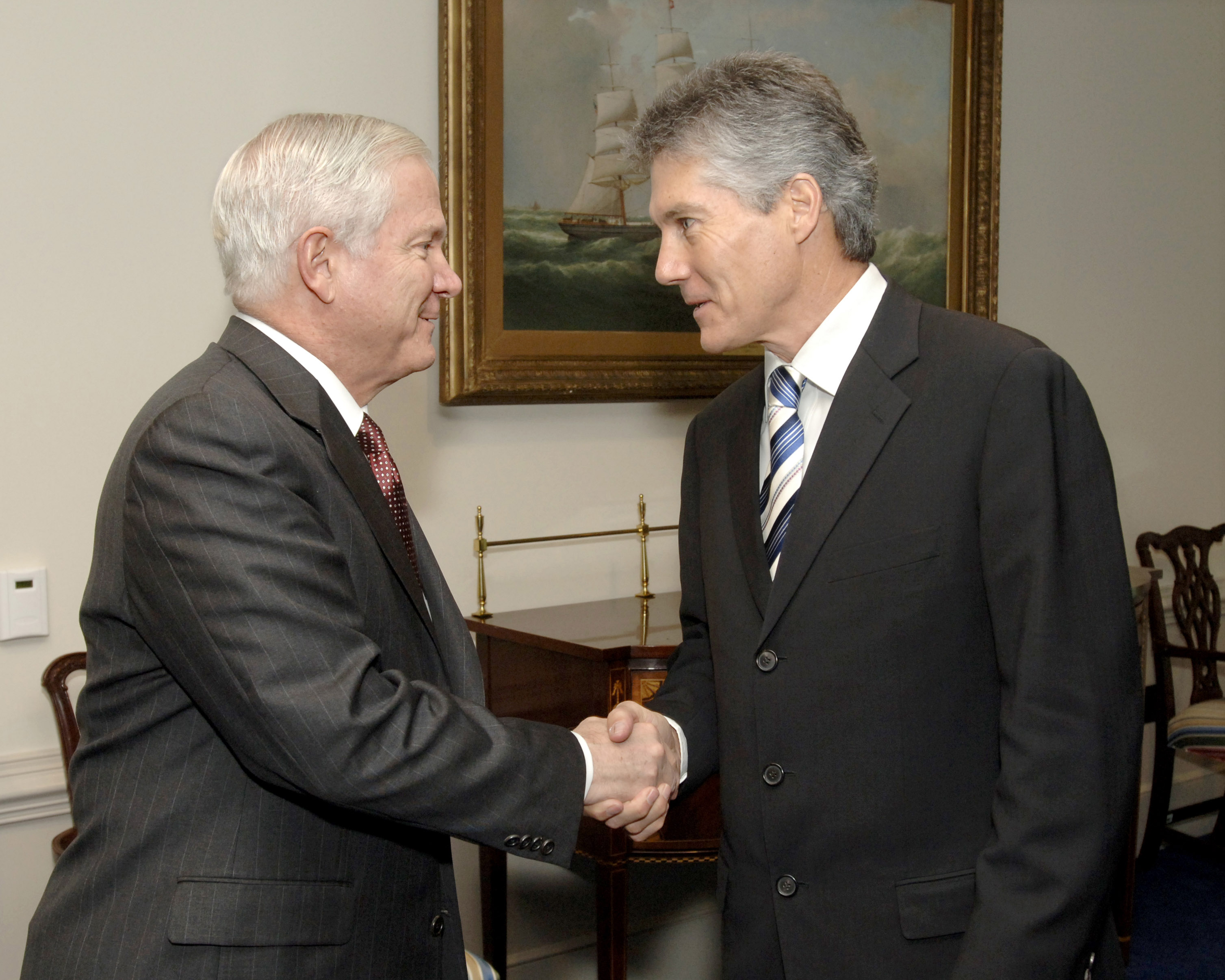
Robert Gates meets face-to-face with Stephen Smith

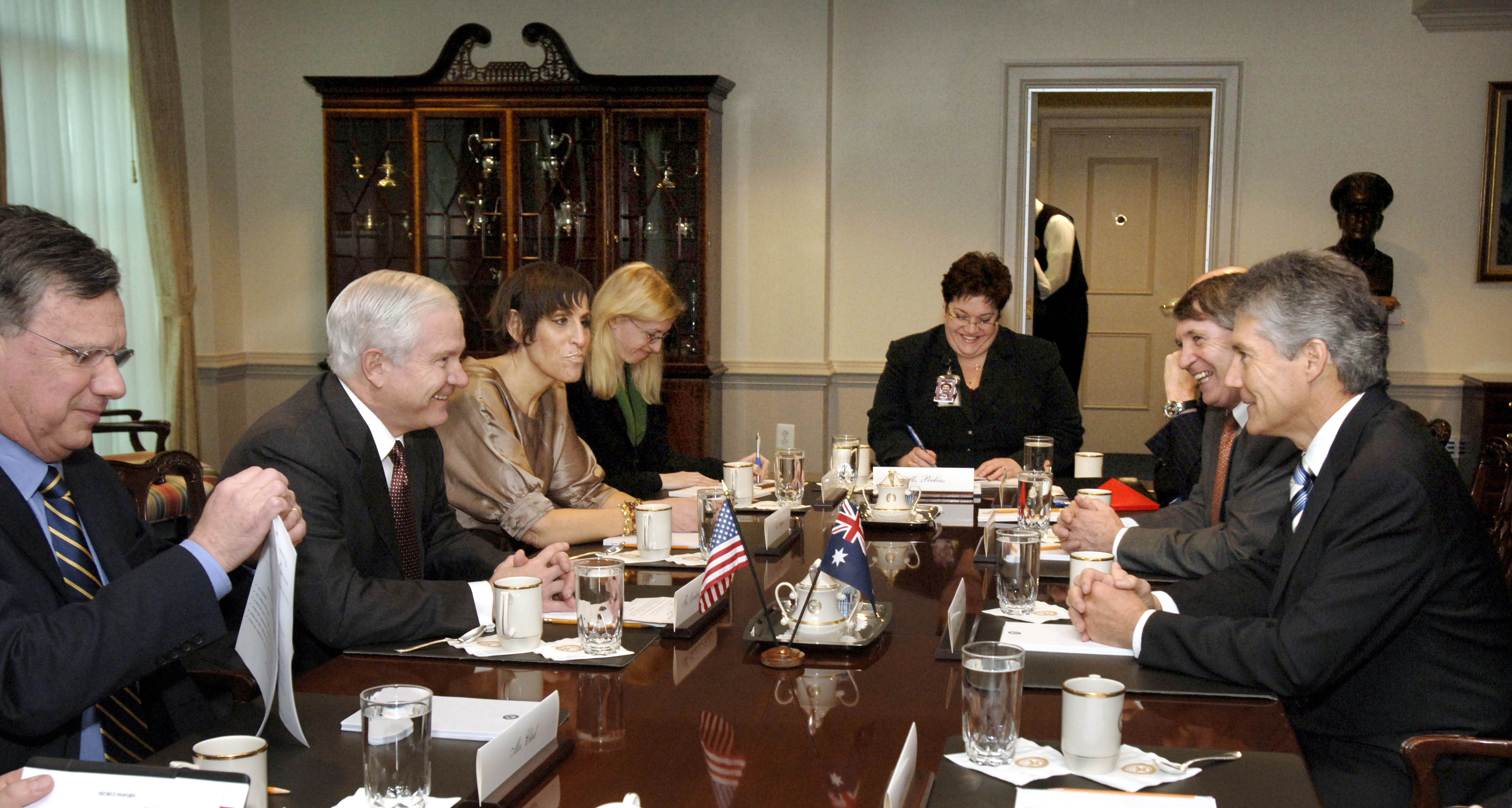
US Secretary of Defense Robert Gates (2nd from left, Debra Cagan to his left) hosts a Pentagon meeting with Stephen Smith (right) in the Pentagon on 28 January 2008

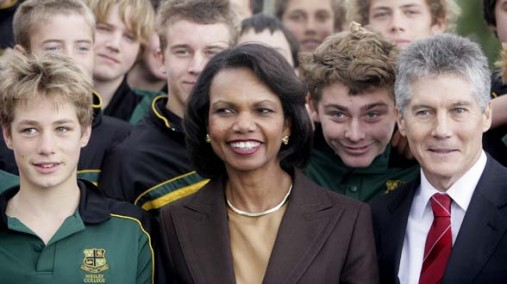
Former US Secretary of State Condoleezza Rice (centre) and Stephen Smith (right) with students from Wesley College during a visit to Kings Park State War Memorial in Perth

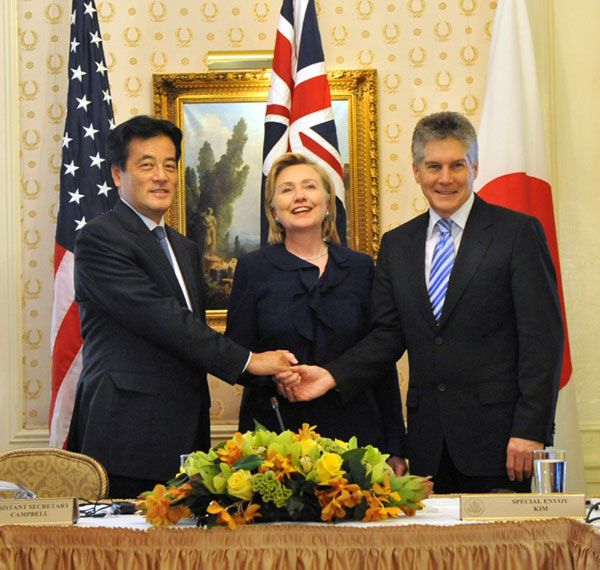
Stephen Smith (right) meets Hillary Clinton (centre) and Katsuya Okada (left) at the Waldorf-Astoria Hotel on 21 September 2009

== See also ==
- First Rudd Ministry
- First Gillard Ministry
- Second Gillard Ministry
- Second Rudd Ministry

Party political offices
Preceded by Michael Beahan	State Secretary of the Australian Labor Party (WA Branch); 1987–1990	Succeeded by
Parliament of Australia
Preceded by Ric Charlesworth	Member of Parliament for Perth; 1993–2013	Succeeded by Alannah MacTiernan
Political offices
Preceded by Alexander Downer	Minister for Foreign Affairs; 2007–2010	Succeeded by Kevin Rudd
Preceded by Simon Crean	Minister for Trade; 2010	Succeeded by Craig Emerson
Preceded by John Faulkner	Minister for Defence; 2010–2013	Succeeded by David Johnston
Diplomatic posts
Preceded by Lynette Wood as Acting High Commissioner	High Commissioner of Australia to the United Kingdom; 2023–present	Incumbent
