= Tony Negus =

Tony Negus AO, APM
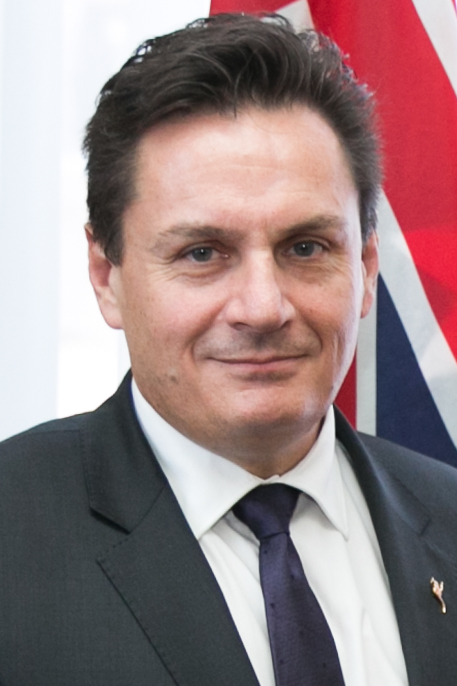
- Negus in Canada, March 2015

High Commissioner of Australia to Canada
- In office 15 January 2015 – 30 November 2017
- Prime Minister: Tony Abbott; Malcolm Turnbull
- Preceded by: Louise Hand
- Succeeded by: Natasha Smith

Commissioner of the Australian Federal Police
- In office 7 September 2009 – 7 September 2014
- Preceded by: Mick Keelty
- Succeeded by: Andrew Colvin

Personal details
- Born: Cowra, New South Wales, Australia
- Profession: Diplomat and police officer

Tony William Negus AO, APM is an Australian diplomat and retired police officer who was the Commissioner of the Australian Federal Police (AFP), being sworn in on 7 September 2009 for a five-year term. He was the sixth Commissioner of the AFP and the second appointed from within the AFP. On 1 December 2014, he was appointed Australian High Commissioner to Canada, effective on 15 January 2015.

== Education ==
Negus holds a master's degree in Public Policy and Administration, and a Graduate Diploma in Executive Leadership. At Harvard University he has completed the Executive Leadership Program.

== Career ==
Negus started his law enforcement career in traffic operations in Canberra in 1982, and later as a detective in the Australian Capital Territory. He worked in community policing, federal investigations, human resources, and protection as well as in national operations in Brisbane, Sydney, and Canberra.

In June 2005, Negus was awarded the Australian Police Medal (APM). One year later, in July 2006, Negus was appointed National Manager of Human Resources, with responsibility for learning and development, professional standards, and people strategies. Before he was appointed as Commissioner of the AFP he had been Deputy Commissioner Operations since October 2007, where he had responsibility for border operations, economic and special operations, forensics and data centres, high technology crime operations, internal liaison networks, and international deployments.

He stepped down from his role as Commissioner at the end of his term in September 2014 and was replaced by his former deputy Andrew Colvin.

== See also ==
- Australian Federal Police
- Law enforcement in Australia

Police appointments
Preceded by Mick Keelty	Commissioner of the Australian Federal Police; 2009–2014	Succeeded by Andrew Colvin
Diplomatic posts
Preceded by Louise Hand	Australian High Commissioner to Canada; 2015–2017	Succeeded by Natasha Smith
