= Debra Cagan =

American politician (born 1954)

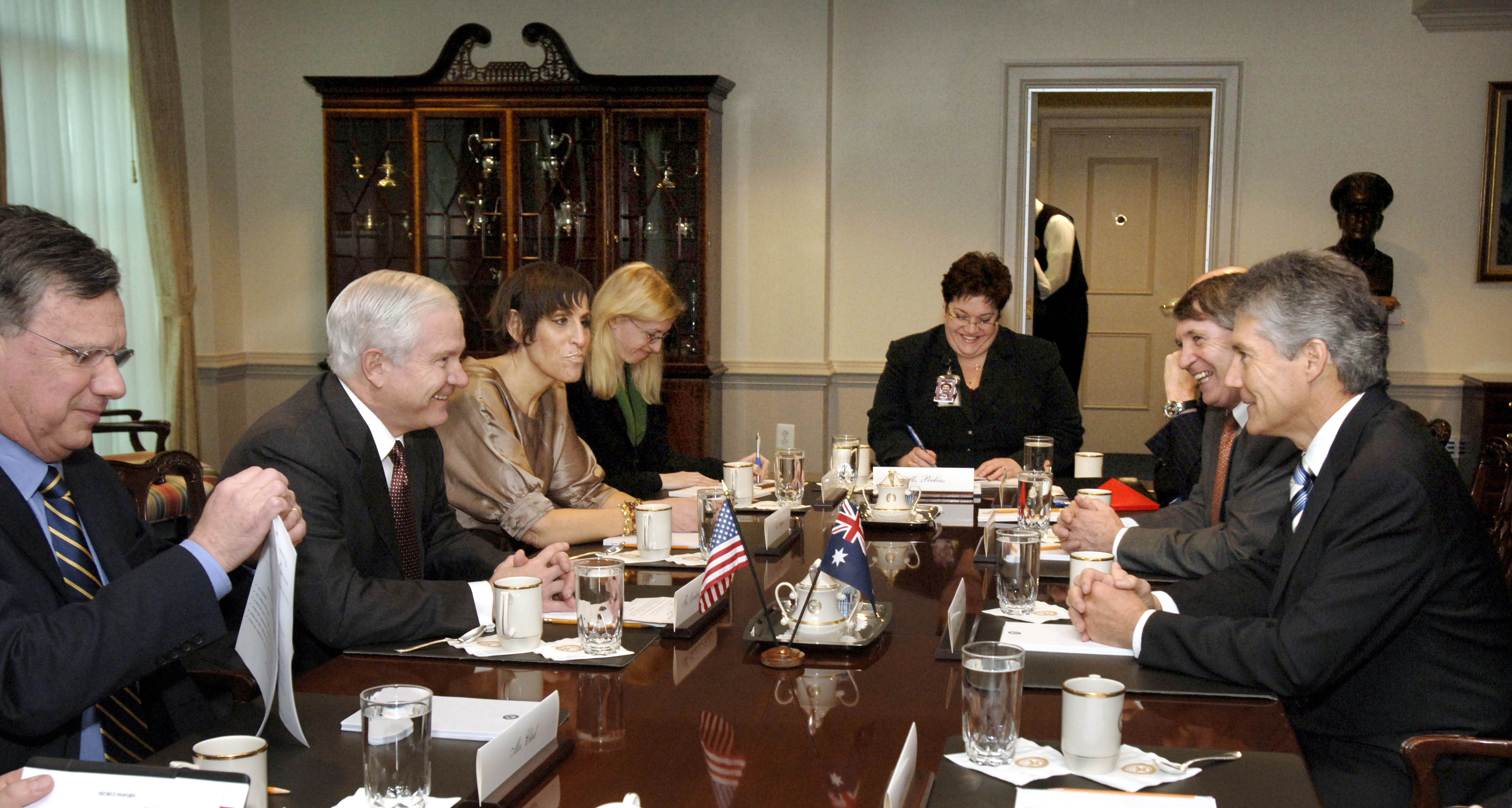
Cagan (third from left) at a meeting between Robert Gates and Stephen Smith, Australian Minister for Foreign Affairs

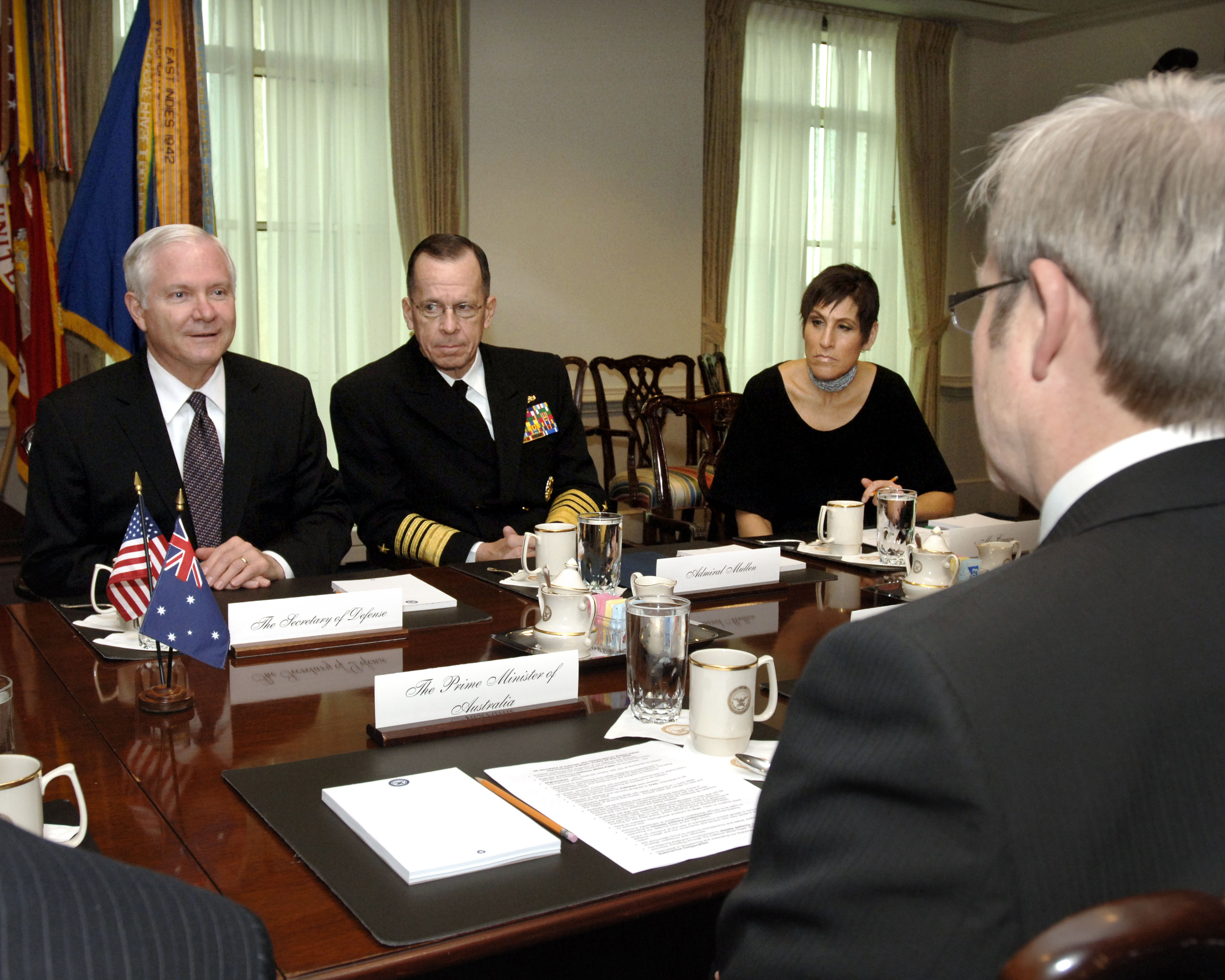
Cagan (third from left) with Gates (left)

Debra L. Cagan (born March, 1954) is an American politician and a former U.S. foreign policy liaison. Her most notable public role was that of an adviser to former United States president George W. Bush.

== Career ==
=== Government positions ===
- Senior Counselor for Coalition Affairs.
- Political adviser for SACT and USJFCOM.
- Senior Coordinator for Nuclear and Nonproliferation Policy, Bureau of European and Canadian Affairs, Department of State, United States, 1996.
- Director of Policy and Regional Affairs within the State Department for Russia and the Newly Independent States, 1998.
- Office Director, Bureau of European and Eurasian Affairs, the State Department, 2001.
- Political Adviser to Supreme Allied Commander Transformation, 2005.
- Deputy Assistant Secretary of Defense for Coalition and Multinational Operations (to Defense Secretary Robert Gates), 2007.
- State Advisor for the Center for Technology and National Security Policy (CTNSP)

== Advocacy ==
An advocate of increased westernisation in ex-Soviet states, Cagan met Georgian Defence Minister David Kezerashvili on 18 July 2007 to discuss bilateral cooperation. Cagan was one of the first to establish the Georgia Train and Equip Program (GTEP), which has allegedly improved the process of development in Georgia’s professional army. She has also visited and conversed with Albanian and Macedonian officials, on behalf of the United States. Cagan toured Eastern European and central Asian countries seeking increased troop provisions in Iraq, to bolster the image of a coalition.
