= Cabinet Secretary (Australian minister) =

Australian cabinet position

- Commonwealth Coat of Arms

- Flag of Australia

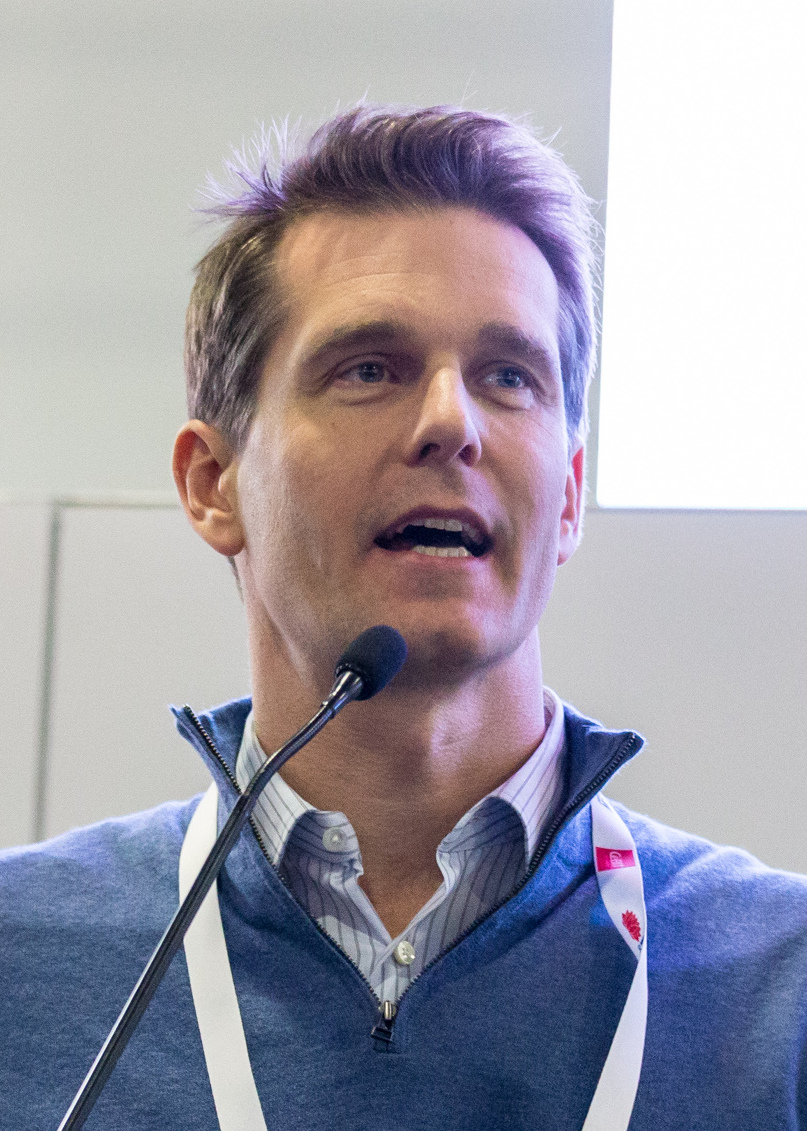
- Incumbent; Andrew Charlton since 13 May 2025
- Department of the Prime Minister and Cabinet
- Style: The Honourable
- Appointer: Governor-General on the advice of the prime minister
- Inaugural holder: John Faulkner
- Formation: 3 December 2007

Cabinet Secretary is a ministerial portfolio within the Australian federal government. It has existed in three periods, from 2007 to 2013, from 2015 to 2017, and since 2022. The minister is responsible for assisting the prime minister of Australia in managing the day-to-day procedural and operational matters of the Cabinet and any Cabinet committees. The Cabinet secretary's portfolio falls within the Department of the Prime Minister and Cabinet.

The Cabinet secretary should not be confused with the secretary of the Department of the Prime Minister and Cabinet, which is the senior Australian Public Service departmental secretary, or other Cabinet secretary positions in other Westminster systems. The UK's minister for the Cabinet Office has similar but not analogous functions.

== History ==
From 1959 to 1968 the duties of the Cabinet secretary were handled by the secretary of the Prime Minister's Department. From 1968 to 1971, the Department of the Cabinet Office existed led by the secretary to the Cabinet, a senior Australian Public Service departmental secretary From 1971 to 1996, the duties of the Cabinet secretary were handed by the secretary of the Department of the Prime Minister and Cabinet.

From 1996 to 2007, Prime Minister John Howard appointed a political staffer to the position of Cabinet Secretary, under the Member of Parliament (Staffing) Act 1984, to head the new Cabinet Policy Unit. Howard also appointed junior ministerial positions of Parliamentary Secretary (Cabinet) to the Prime Minister held by Chris Miles MP and Parliamentary Secretary to the Cabinet held by Senator Bill Heffernan. Howard's Cabinet Secretary practice was resumed by Prime Minister Tony Abbott from 2013 to 2015.

In 2007, Prime Minister Kevin Rudd created the new ministerial position of Cabinet Secretary with Australian Labor Party veteran Senator John Faulkner appointed conjointly as Special Minister of State to drive an integrity agenda. The position was carried over by Prime Minister Julia Gillard from 2010 to 2013 and again by Prime Minister Kevin Rudd in 2013.

In 2015, Prime Minister Malcolm Turnbull resumed the ministerial position of Cabinet Secretary, broadening its responsibilities and including it in Cabinet.

On the 18 January 2017, Prime Minister Malcolm Turnbull announced a ministerial reshuffle in which the position of Cabinet Secretary was disbanded and its functions returned to the Prime Minister's Office as per the Howard government.

In 2022, Prime Minister Anthony Albanese reinstated the ministerial position of Cabinet Secretary with the appointment of Mark Dreyfus QC, MP.

== Role ==
Historically, the position has been a junior ministerial portfolio, either of Parliamentary Secretary rank or of the Outer Ministry, held conjointly with another ministerial portfolio such as the Special Minister of State, the Minister for Home Affairs, and the Parliamentary Secretary for Climate Change.

The roles and responsibilities of the Cabinet secretary have varied since 2007 to 2013 and again since 2015, depending on the priorities and agenda of the prime minister of the day. Conventionally though, the Cabinet secretary supports the prime minister through overseeing the Cabinet process and providing political and policy coordination when delegated.

Under the Turnbull government, according to the Cabinet Handbook, through delegations from the prime minister, the Cabinet secretary has the power to:

- provide authority to ministers to bring items forward for consideration by the Cabinet or a Cabinet Committee;
- finalise the Cabinet and the Cabinet committee business lists;
- maintain and enforce the integrity of Cabinet rules and processes, including working with the Department of the Prime Minister and Cabinet (PM&C) to ensure Cabinet submissions are of high quality;
- authorise Cabinet minutes;
- approve absences of Cabinet ministers; and
- deal with practical issues regarding the co-option of non-Cabinet ministers and assistant ministers, and the attendance of officials.

Under the Turnbull government, the Cabinet secretary was a full member of the Cabinet and a sits on the National Security Committee, the Expenditure Review Committee, the National Infrastructure Committee, the Innovation and Science Committee, the Indigenous Policy Committee, the Governance Committee, and the Digital Transformation Committee.

== Minister Assisting the Cabinet Secretary ==
The Assistant Cabinet Secretary, a junior ministerial position, was established by Prime Minister Malcolm Turnbull on the 21 September 2015 to support the work of the Cabinet secretary. The position was renamed the Minister Assisting the Cabinet Secretary on the 18 February 2016, reflecting the renaming of parliamentary secretary level positions as assistant ministers. The first Assistant Cabinet Secretary and re-titled Minister Assisting the Cabinet Secretary was Scott Ryan, conjointly holding the portfolio of Special Minister of State.

In line with the Cabinet reshuffle on the 18 January 2017 which disbanded the Cabinet secretary, Scott Ryan was named the Minister Assisting the Prime Minister for Cabinet whilst continuing as Special Minister of State. On the 13 November 2017, Scott Ryan was appointed the President of the Senate and the position of Minister Assisting the Prime Minister for Cabinet was not continued.

== PM&C Cabinet Division ==
The Cabinet Division (formerly the Cabinet Secretariat and the Cabinet Implementation Unit) of the Department of the Prime Minister and Cabinet provides operational support and procedural advice to the prime minister, the Cabinet secretary, the minister assisting the Cabinet secretary and the chairs of the Cabinet committees. The Cabinet Division is also responsible for the management of the records of successive Cabinets. It maintains the collection of Cabinet documents for the current Government and preserves the Cabinet records of previous Governments. The Cabinet Division is led by a first assistant secretary and includes the Cabinet Secretariat and the Strategic Coordination and National Security Branch.

== List of Cabinet secretaries ==
The following individuals have been appointed as Cabinet secretary, with some serving concurrently:

Order	Minister	Party	Prime Minister	Joint portfolios	Term start	Term end	Term in office
1	Senator John Faulkner	Labor	Rudd	Special Minister of State; Vice-President of the Executive Council	3 December 2007	9 June 2009	1 year, 188 days
2	Senator Joe Ludwig	Labor	Rudd	Special Minister of State; Manager of Government Business in the Senate	9 June 2009	14 September 2010	1 year, 97 days
2	Senator Joe Ludwig	Labor	Gillard	Special Minister of State; Manager of Government Business in the Senate	9 June 2009	14 September 2010	1 year, 97 days
3	Mark Dreyfus QC, MP	Labor	Gillard	Parliamentary Secretary for Climate Change and Energy Efficiency; Parliamentary Secretary for Industry and Innovation	14 September 2010	4 February 2013	2 years, 143 days
4	Jason Clare MP	Labor	Gillard	Minister for Home Affairs; Minister for Justice	4 February 2013	27 June 2013	143 days
5	Alan Griffin MP	Labor	Rudd	Parliamentary Secretary to the Prime Minister	27 June 2013	18 September 2013	83 days
6	Senator Arthur Sinodinos AO	Liberal	Turnbull	None	21 September 2015	24 January 2017	1 year, 125 days
(3)	Mark Dreyfus KC, MP	Labor	Albanese	Attorney-General	1 June 2022	13 May 2025	2 years, 346 days
7	Andrew Charlton MP	Labor	Albanese	Assistant Minister for Science, Technology and the Digital Economy	13 May 2025	Incumbent	1 year, 117 days
