= List of high commissioners of Australia to Canada =

High Commissioner of Australia to Canada

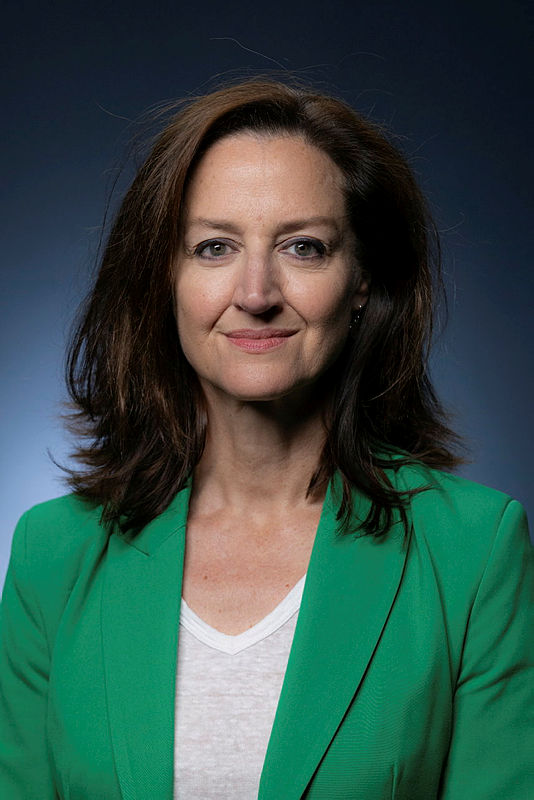
- Incumbent; Kate Logan since December 2024
- Department of Foreign Affairs and Trade
- Style: Her Excellency
- Reports to: Minister for Foreign Affairs
- Residence: Australia House, Sandy Hill, Ottawa
- Nominator: Prime Minister of Australia
- Appointer: Governor General of Australia
- Inaugural holder: Sir Thomas Glasgow
- Formation: 23 December 1939
- Website: Australian High Commission, Canada

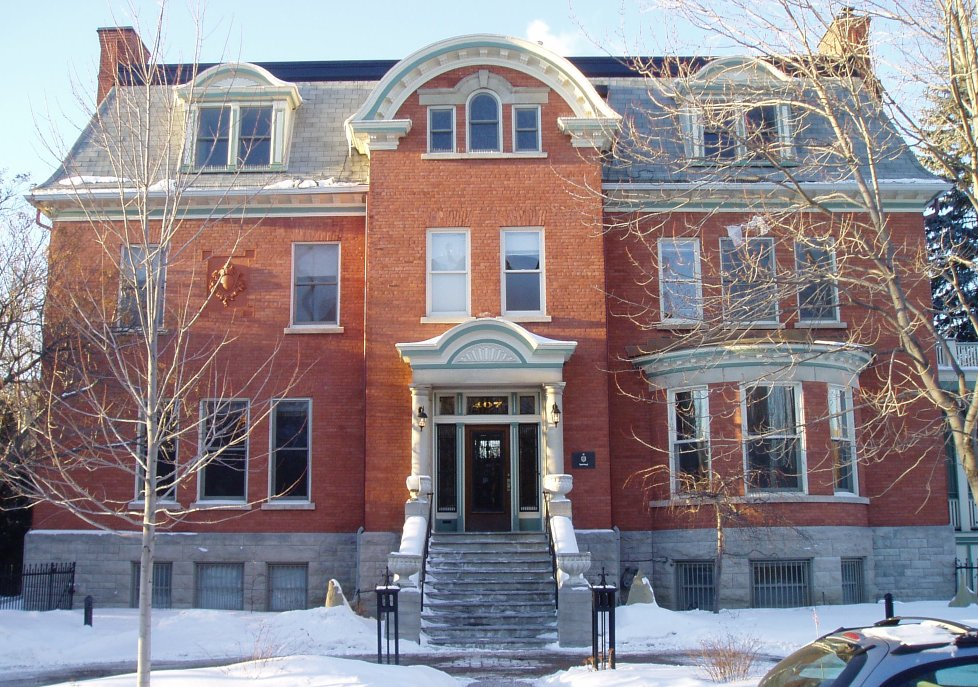
Australia House, the official residence of the high commissioner since 1940.

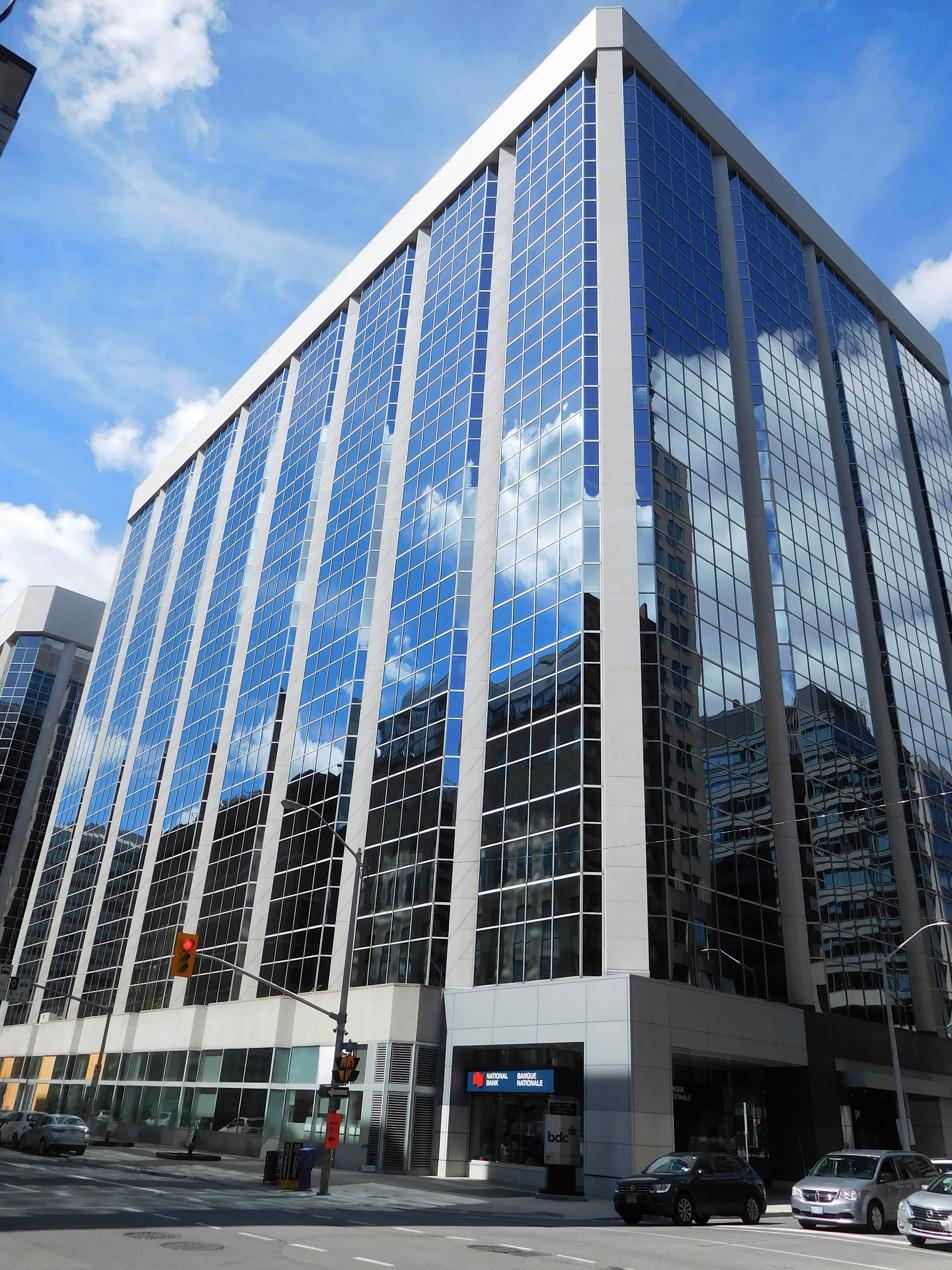
The Sun Life Financial Centre at 50 O'Connor Street, Ottawa, location of the High Commission Chancery since 1989.

The high commissioner of Australia to Canada is an officer of the Australian Department of Foreign Affairs and Trade and the head of the High Commission of the Commonwealth of Australia to Canada. The Australian High Commission also has responsibility for relations with Bermuda, a self-governing Overseas Territory of the United Kingdom. The position has the rank and status of an ambassador extraordinary and plenipotentiary and is currently held by Kate Logan since 9 December 2024.

Australia and Canada have enjoyed official diplomatic relations since 12 September 1939, when high commissioners were first exchanged as Australia's second independent diplomatic posting established from 29 March 1940, with only the High Commission in London (1910) being older. As fellow Dominion countries, Australia and Canada had many prior contacts, particularly in trade, and continue to share a monarch as Commonwealth realms. The High Commissioner's Official Residence is located at Australia House, Ottawa, while the Chancery is located at the Sun Life Financial Centre, Suite 1301, 50 O'Connor Street, in Downtown Ottawa. The work of the High Commission is also supported by a Consulate-General in Toronto and an Honorary Consulate in Vancouver, which are run by Austrade.

== Posting history ==
Formal diplomatic relations between Australia and Canada formally began on 12 September 1939 when the two countries agreed to exchange high commissioners. Australian representation in Canada prior to this was limited to a Trade Commissioner post with a focus on promoting trade, with Rupert Haynes, an Australian businessman connected to the South Australian fruit industry, appointed by the Minister for Markets and Transport as the first "Commercial Representative for the Commonwealth of Australia in the Dominion of Canada" on 1 April 1929. Haynes was recalled on 15 March 1930, and was later replaced by Lewis Richard Macgregor, who served until May 1938.

The first Canadian high commissioner, Charles Jost Burchell, was appointed on 3 November 1939 and arrived in Australia on 27 December 1939. On 23 December 1939, Prime Minister Robert Menzies announced the appointment of Sir Thomas Glasgow as the first Australian high commissioner. Glasgow arrived in Ottawa on 29 March 1940.

From 7 January 1974 to 1975, the high commissioner had non-resident accreditation for Barbados, when it was transferred to the high commissioner in Jamaica.

== High commissioners ==
#	Officeholder	Term start date	Term end date	Time in office	Notes
1	Sir Thomas Glasgow	23 December 1939	16 January 1945	5 years, 24 days	
−	William Roy Hodgson (Acting)	16 January 1945	24 July 1945	189 days	
2	Alfred Stirling	24 July 1945	1 November 1946	1 year, 100 days	
3	Frank Forde	1 November 1946	14 May 1953	6 years, 194 days	
4	Sir Douglas Copland	20 May 1953	10 July 1956	3 years, 51 days	
−	Trevor Pyman (Acting)	10 July 1956	31 January 1957	205 days	
5	Walter Crocker	31 January 1957	3 September 1958	1 year, 215 days	
−	Frederick Thomas Homer (Acting)	3 September 1958	11 March 1959	189 days	
6	Sir Walter Cawthorn	11 March 1959	2 May 1960	1 year, 52 days	
−	Kieren Desmond (Acting)	2 May 1960	6 May 1961	1 year, 4 days	
7	David Hay	7 May 1961	16 July 1964	3 years, 70 days	
8	Sir Kenneth Bailey	17 July 1964	7 May 1969	4 years, 294 days	
−	W. Kevin Flanagan (Acting)	7 May 1969	1 August 1969	86 days	
9	David McNicol	2 August 1969	April 1973	3 years, 7 months	
10	James Ingram	June 1973	December 1974	1 year, 6 months	
11	Max Loveday	January 1975	November 1977	2 years, 10 months	
12	John Ryan	November 1977	April 1980	2 years, 5 months	
13	Barrie Dexter	April 1980	September 1983	3 years, 5 months	
14	Rowen Osborn	September 1983	May 1985	1 year, 8 months	
15	Robert Laurie	May 1985	April 1989	3 years, 11 months	
16	James Humphries	April 1989	May 1991	2 years, 1 month	
17	David Spencer	May 1991	July 1993	2 years, 2 months	
18	Frank Murray	July 1993	May 1997	3 years, 10 months	
19	Gregory Wood	May 1997	July 2001	4 years, 2 months	
20	Tony Hely	July 2001	February 2005	3 years, 7 months	
21	William Fisher	February 2005	November 2008	3 years, 9 months	
22	Justin Brown	November 2008	December 2011	3 years, 1 month	
23	Louise Hand	January 2012	14 January 2015	3 years	
24	Tony Negus	15 January 2015	30 November 2017	2 years, 319 days	
25	Natasha Smith	30 November 2017	20 December 2021	4 years, 20 days	
26	Scott Ryan	20 December 2021	December 2024	4 years, 261 days	
27	Kate Logan	December 2024	incumbent		

== Consulates ==
Location	Open	Consular district
High Commission, Ottawa	1939	New Brunswick, Newfoundland and Labrador, Nova Scotia, Ontario (excluding Greater Toronto Area), Prince Edward Island, Quebec, Bermuda
Consulate-General, Toronto	1975	Greater Toronto Area
Consulate, Vancouver	1975	Alberta, British Columbia, Manitoba, Northwest Territories, Nunavut, Saskatchewan, Yukon Territory

The work of the high commission is supported by a consulate-general in Toronto, which has been operated by the Australian Trade Commission (now Austrade) since 1929, and was upgraded to a consulate-general in 1975. The Honorary Consulate in Vancouver was originally established in 1947 as a Trade Commission and also upgraded to a consulate in 1975. There was also previously a consulate-general in Montreal from 1975 to its closure in 1976, having previously operated as a Trade Commission only since 1953.

== See also ==
- Australia-Canada relations
- List of high commissioners of Canada to Australia
- Foreign relations of Australia
