= John Faulkner =

Australian politician (born 1954)

The Honourable John Faulkner
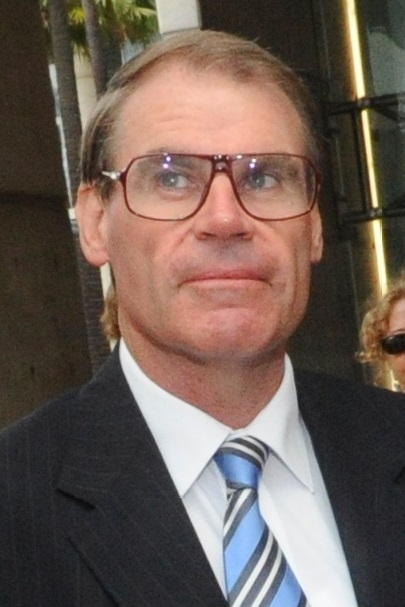

Father of the Australian Senate
- In office 1 July 2014 – 6 February 2015
- Preceded by: Ron Boswell
- Succeeded by: Ian Macdonald

Minister for Defence
- In office 9 June 2009 – 13 September 2010
- Prime Minister: Kevin Rudd; Julia Gillard
- Preceded by: Joel Fitzgibbon
- Succeeded by: Stephen Smith

Vice-President of the Executive Council
- In office 3 December 2007 – 13 September 2010
- Prime Minister: Kevin Rudd; Julia Gillard
- Preceded by: Nick Minchin
- Succeeded by: Robert McClelland

National President of the Labor Party
- In office 10 January 2007 – 27 February 2008
- Preceded by: Warren Mundine
- Succeeded by: Mike Rann

Special Minister of State
- In office 3 December 2007 – 9 June 2009
- Prime Minister: Kevin Rudd
- Preceded by: Gary Nairn
- Succeeded by: Joe Ludwig

Minister for the Environment
- In office 25 March 1994 – 11 March 1996
- Prime Minister: Paul Keating
- Preceded by: Graham Richardson
- Succeeded by: Robert Hill

Minister for Defence Science and Personnel
- In office 24 March 1993 – 25 March 1994
- Prime Minister: Paul Keating
- Preceded by: Gordon Bilney
- Succeeded by: Gary Punch

Minister for Veterans' Affairs
- In office 24 March 1993 – 25 March 1994
- Prime Minister: Paul Keating
- Preceded by: Ben Humphreys
- Succeeded by: Con Sciacca

Senator for New South Wales
- In office 4 April 1989 – 6 February 2015
- Preceded by: Arthur Gietzelt
- Succeeded by: Jenny McAllister

Personal details
- Born: 12 April 1954 (age 72) Leeton, Australia
- Party: Australian Labor Party
- Education: Macquarie University

John Philip Faulkner (born 12 April 1954) is an Australian former Labor Party politician who was a Senator for New South Wales from 1989 to 2015. He was a Cabinet Minister in the Keating, Rudd and Gillard governments.

After his election to the Senate in 1989, Prime Minister Paul Keating appointed Faulkner as Minister for Veterans' Affairs and Minister for Defence Science and Personnel in 1993. In 1994, Faulkner was moved to the position of Minister for the Environment, which he held until Labor's defeat in 1996. He later served as the Leader of the Labor Party in the Senate from 1996 to 2005, and returned to Cabinet upon Labor's election in 2007, after Kevin Rudd made him Vice-President of the Executive Council and Special Minister of State. He later served as Minister for Defence from 2009 to 2010, when he retired from frontline politics. He became the Father of the Australian Senate in 2014, and retired from Parliament altogether a year later by way of resignation, and is considered by some as an elder statesman. Faulkner has since been a member of the board of the Global Panel Foundation – Australasia – an NGO that works global in crisis areas.

== Background and early career ==
Faulkner was born in Leeton, New South Wales on 12 April 1954, attended Pennant Hills High School, and was educated at Macquarie University, Sydney, where he graduated in Arts and Education (BA, DipEd). Before entering politics he worked as a Special Education teacher in government schools from 1977 to 1979. In 1980 he was employed as a Research officer to the New South Wales Minister for Sport and Recreation, Ken Booth. Gaining prominence within the ALP, he was made Assistant General Secretary of the NSW party in 1980, serving for nine years and became a member of the ALP National Executive in 1989.

== Political career ==
A leading member of the Socialist Left faction of the ALP, Faulkner was appointed to the Senate in 1989 to succeed the former left-wing minister Arthur Gietzelt, who had resigned mid-term. In the Keating Labor government, Faulkner was Minister for Veterans' Affairs and Minister for Defence Science and Personnel 1993–94, and Minister for the Environment, Sport and Territories, with a seat in the Cabinet, 1994–96.

After the defeat of the Keating government in 1996, Faulkner became Leader of the Opposition in the Senate, and was a member of the Opposition Shadow Ministry 1996–2004. He was at various times Shadow Minister for Social Security, Public Administration and Home Affairs. He was a key Labor strategist in the 1998, 2001 and 2004 federal elections, and was a particularly close advisor to Mark Latham during the 2004 election. In the wake of Labor's defeat in that election, he resigned his positions. Faulkner became the first Labor Senate leader who did not become Government Senate leader since Don Willesee. In October 2006 John Faulkner was elected as the National President of the Australian Labor Party until February 2008 and chaired the Labor's National Conference in 2007.

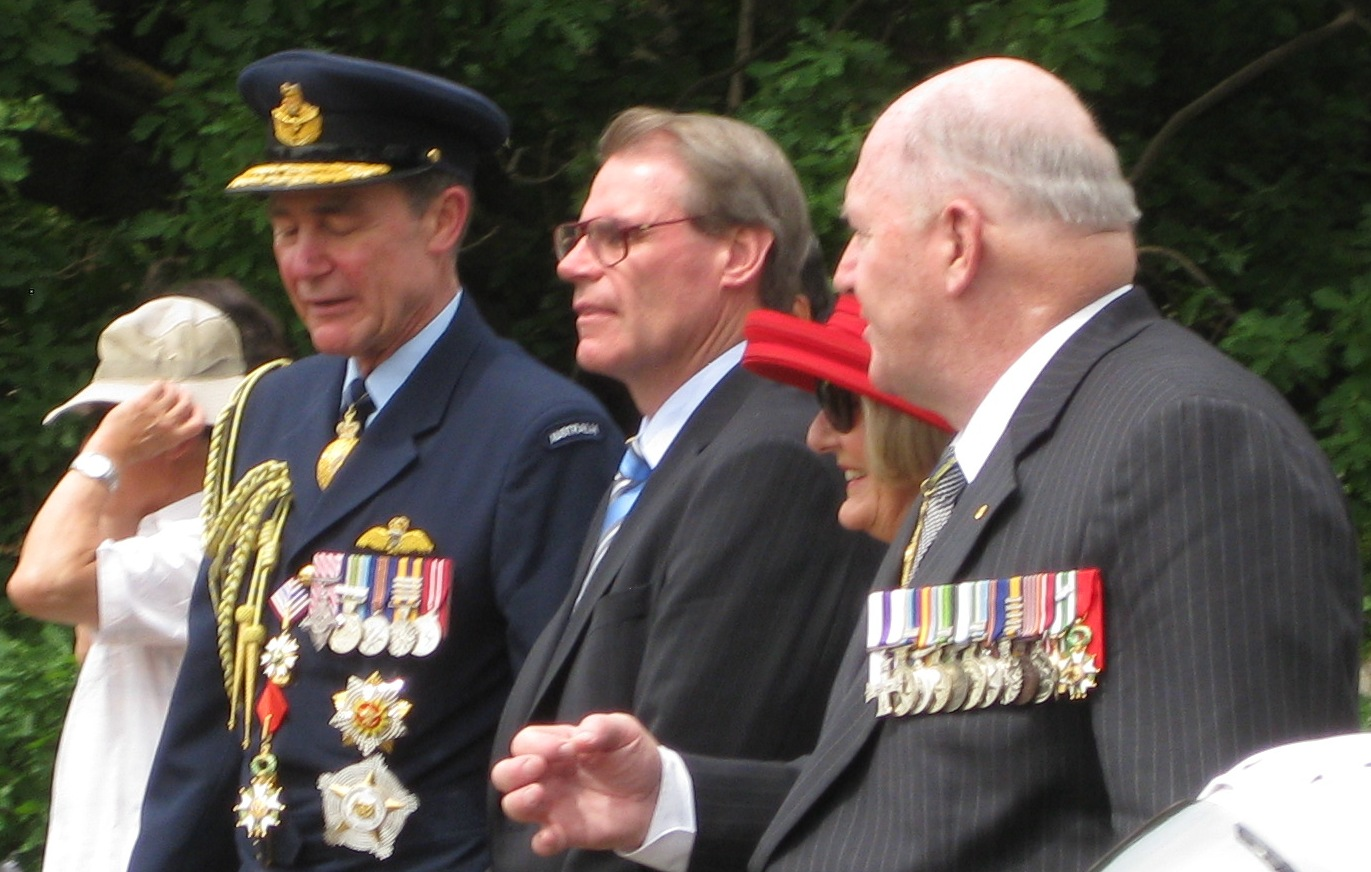
Faulkner with Chief of the Defence Force Air Chief Marshal Angus Houston and former Chief of the Defence Force Peter Cosgrove in 2009.

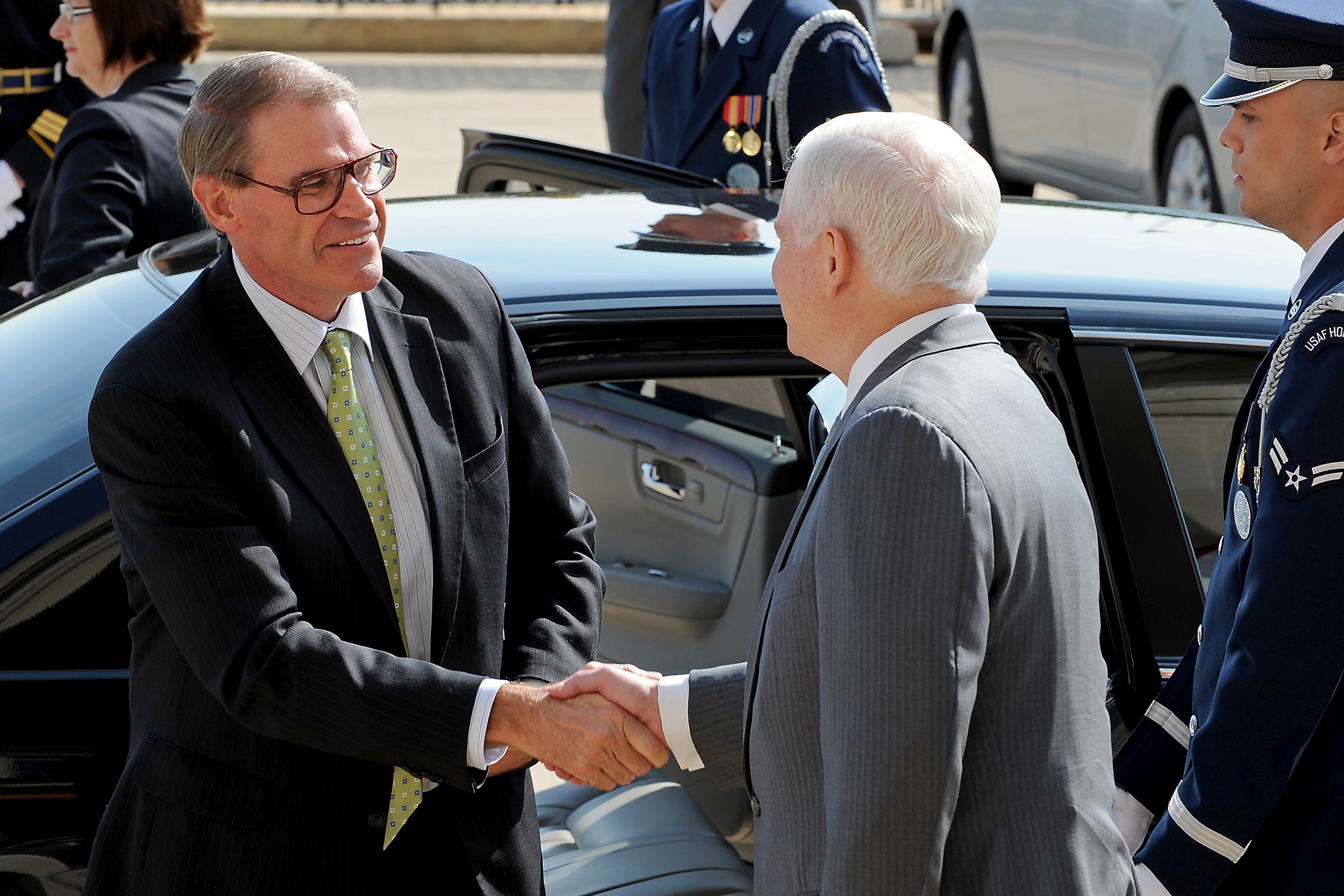
John Faulkner (left) with US Defence Secretary Robert Gates (right).

In the First Rudd Ministry, Faulkner served as the Vice-President of the Executive Council, Special Minister of State and Cabinet Secretary. In his role he introduced new rules for ministerial conduct and fundraising aimed at reducing the influence of lobbyists on government decisions. He also introduced new guidelines reducing the overt political control of government funded advertising.

On 9 June 2009, Faulkner was sworn in the Minister for Defence, replacing Joel Fitzgibbon, who had stepped down on 4 June. He retained this portfolio in the First Gillard government until the 2010 federal election following an earlier announcement that he would step down as Defence Minister and return to the backbench.

In 2014 Faulkner began a process of reforms that sought to stamp out perceived corruption and factional infighting within the New South Wales branch of the Australian Labor Party. Faulkner proposed to include rank–and–file members in decisions such as the selection of candidates for Senate and Legislative Council vacancies and party tickets, and a vote in the direct election of the New South Wales parliamentary leaders. However, Faulkner's reform proposals were mostly rejected at NSW Labor's 2014 conference. The direct election of party leader gained support with effect from after the 2015 election.

=== Resignation ===
Faulkner announced on 30 April 2014 that he would not seek re-election and would be retiring at the end of his term on 30 June 2017. On 11 December 2014, however, he announced that he would be resigning from the Senate in late January or early February 2015, creating a casual vacancy. Faulkner resigned on 6 February 2015.

== Post-politics life ==
Faulkner has since been a member of the board of the Global Panel Foundation – Australasia – an NGO that works global in crisis areas.

== Personal life ==
Faulkner was formerly married to fellow Labor politician Sandra Nori and they have two children.

== Major published works ==
- Costar, Brian; Lees, Meg; Coonan, Helen; Faulkner, John; Evans, Harry (2000). Deadlock or Democracy? The Future of the Senate. Sydney: UNSW Press. 57 pages. ISBN 0-86840-570-1.
- Faulkner, John; Macintyre, Stuart (2001). True believers: the story of the federal parliamentary Labor Party. Crows Nest: Allen & Unwin. 328 pages. ISBN 1-86508-609-6.
- Faulkner, John (2005). Parliamentary privilege: precedents, procedure and practice in the Australian Senate 1966–2005. Canberra: Senate Committee of Privileges. 201 pages. ISBN 0-642-71601-3.

== See also ==
- Second Keating Ministry
- First Rudd Ministry
- First Gillard Ministry

Parliament of Australia
Preceded by Ron Boswell	Father of the Australian Senate; 2014–2015	Succeeded by Ian Macdonald
Political offices
Preceded by Ben Humphreys	Minister for Veterans' Affairs; 1993–1994	Succeeded by Con Sciacca
Preceded by Gordon Bilney	Minister for Defence Science and Personnel; 1993–1994	Succeeded by Gary Punch
Preceded by Graham Richardson	Minister for the Environment; 1994–1996	Succeeded by Robert Hill
Preceded by Gary Nairn	Special Minister of State; 2007–2009	Succeeded by Joe Ludwig
Preceded by Nick Minchin	Vice-President of the Executive Council; 2007–2010	Succeeded by Robert McClelland
Preceded by Joel Fitzgibbon	Minister for Defence; 2009–2010	Succeeded by Stephen Smith
Party political offices
Preceded by Gareth Evans	Leader of the Labor Party in the Senate; 1996–2004	Succeeded by Chris Evans
Preceded by Warren Mundine	National President of the Labor Party; 2007–2008	Succeeded by Mike Rann
