= Australia House (Ottawa) =

Residence of the Australian High Commissioner to Canada

Coordinates: 45.428926°N 75.677986°W

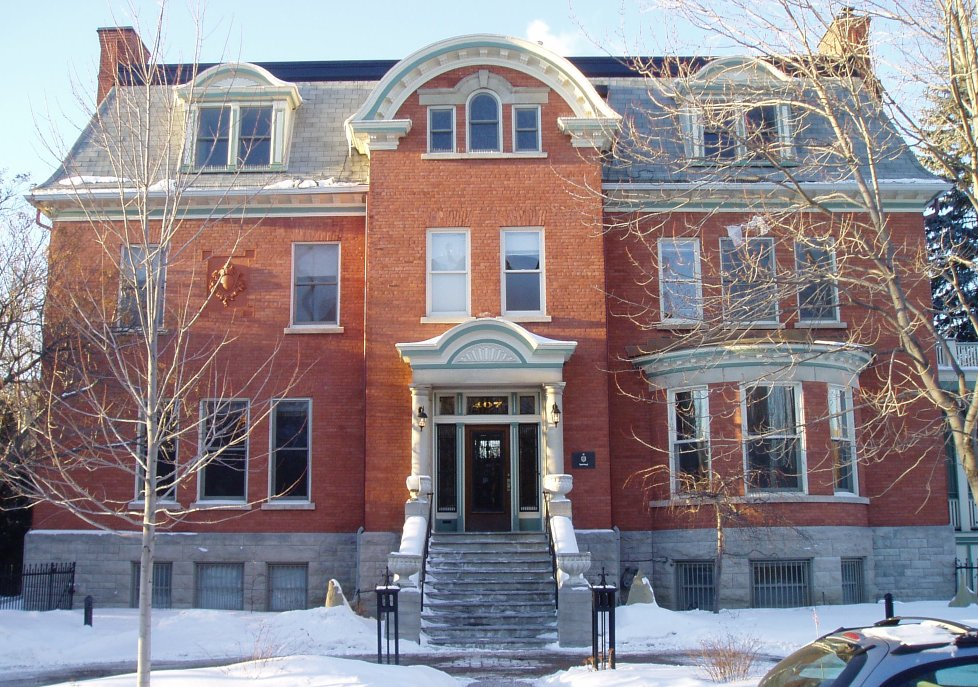
Australia House in Ottawa

Australia House in Ottawa, Ontario, Canada is the official residence of the Australian High Commissioner to Canada. The house is located on a corner lot at 407 Wilbrod Street in the Sandy Hill neighbourhood of Ottawa, near to a number of other embassies and official residences. The house was built in 1910 by William Davis, and is believed to have been designed by John W.H. Watts. Davis died under inauspicious circumstances in 1916 and it lay vacant for several years before being purchased by Colonel Cameron Macpherson Edwards, who had earlier lived at 24 Sussex Drive. The Edwards left in 1937 and rented the house to Germany to house the consul general, Dr. Erich Windels, who was friendly with Canadian prime minister William Lyon Mackenzie King, who lived nearby. Windels was expelled from Canada upon the declaration of war in September 1939.

In part because of the war, the Australian delegation in Ottawa was looking for more spacious accommodation, and the newly vacant building met these needs. In 1940 it became the residence of the high commissioner, and they bought the building from the Edwards soon after. It has housed every high commissioner since, as well as visiting Australian dignitaries, including any Australian prime ministers who visit Ottawa. From 1947 until 1953 the building was home to ex-prime minister Frank Forde during his term as Australian high commissioner.

Since December 2024, Her Excellency Kate Logan is the latest high commissioner to reside at Australia House.

The chancery of the high commission is located at Suite 1301, Sun Life Financial Centre, at 50 O'Connor Street in Downtown Ottawa.

== See also ==
- High Commission of Australia in Ottawa
- Australian diplomatic missions overseas
- Department of Foreign Affairs and Trade
