= Joe Ludwig =

Australian politician (born 1959)

The Honourable Joe Ludwig
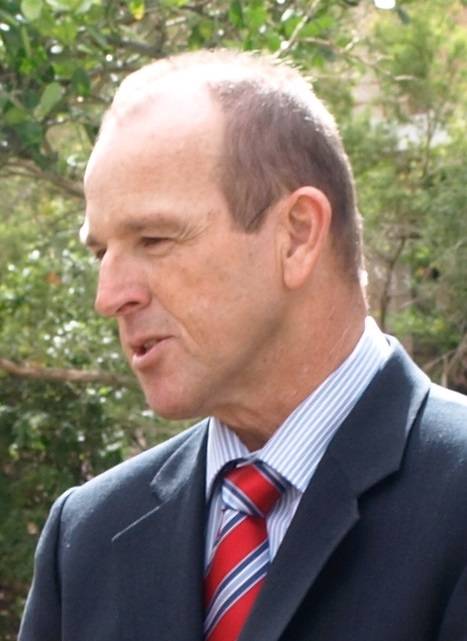

Senator for Queensland
- In office 1 July 1999 – 9 May 2016

Minister for Agriculture, Fisheries and Forestry
- In office 14 September 2010 – 1 July 2013
- Prime Minister: Julia Gillard
- Preceded by: Tony Burke
- Succeeded by: Joel Fitzgibbon

Cabinet Secretary
- In office 9 June 2009 – 14 September 2010
- Prime Minister: Kevin Rudd; Julia Gillard
- Preceded by: John Faulkner
- Succeeded by: Gary Gray

Special Minister of State
- In office 9 June 2009 – 14 September 2010
- Prime Minister: Kevin Rudd; Julia Gillard
- Preceded by: John Faulkner
- Succeeded by: Gary Gray

Minister for Human Services
- In office 3 December 2007 – 9 June 2009
- Prime Minister: Kevin Rudd
- Preceded by: Chris Ellison
- Succeeded by: Chris Bowen

Personal details
- Born: Joseph William Ludwig; 21 July 1959 (age 67) Longreach, Queensland, Australia

Joseph William Ludwig (born 21 July 1959) is an Australian barrister and retired politician. He was a member of the Australian Senate for the state of Queensland from July 1999 to May 2016, representing the Australian Labor Party. Ludwig served in a range of portfolios in the first Rudd and the second Gillard ministries until his resignation from Cabinet as the Minister for Agriculture, Fisheries and Forestry and Minister Assisting the Attorney-General on Queensland Floods Recovery, in 2013.

== Background and early career ==
Ludwig was born in Longreach and has lived and worked in various locations throughout regional Australia. He is married and lives in Brisbane with his wife and two daughters. His father, Bill Ludwig, was National President of the Australian Workers' Union, one of Australia's largest trade unions, and a powerful figure in the Queensland branch of the Labor Party. Ludwig (junior) was educated at the University of Queensland, where he graduated with a Bachelor of Arts, the Queensland University of Technology, where he graduated with a Bachelor of Laws, and the Australian National University, where he completed a Graduate Diploma in Legal Practice.

Ludwig began his career as an Industrial Inspector and Training Consultant, before moving to the Queensland Branch of the Australian Workers' Union. Prior to entering the Australian Senate, Ludwig was a barrister and served with the Australian Army Reserve.

== Parliamentary career ==
A member of the Australian Labor Party since 1978, Ludwig was elected to the Senate in 1998, 2004 and 2010. Senator Ludwig was a Deputy Opposition Whip in the Senate 2000–01, and was elected to the Opposition Shadow Ministry in October 2004 as Shadow Minister for Justice and Customs and Manager of Opposition Business in the Senate. He was promoted to Shadow Attorney-General and Manager of Opposition Business in March 2007 following the resignation of Kelvin Thomson.

Ludwig was appointed Minister for Human Services following the 2007 federal election. He was the Manager of Government Business in the Senate, under both the Rudd and Gillard governments until 2012.

Ludwig was promoted to Cabinet Secretary and Special Minister of State in June 2009.

Following the 2010 federal election, Ludwig was appointed as Minister for Agriculture, Fisheries and Forestry. As Minister he has been responsible for significant reforms to the industry. Following the airing of animal cruelty to Australian cattle in Indonesian abattoirs, the Government temporarily suspended the live export trade while strict animal welfare standards to the trade were introduced.

On 5 January 2011 he was given the added responsibility of Minister Assisting the Attorney-General on Queensland Floods Recovery. In that role Ludwig has overseen the Commonwealth's response to major natural disasters in Queensland, including the 2010-11 floods, Cyclone Yasi and the January 2013 Eastern Australia floods. He has been responsible for negotiating additional assistance measures directly with the Queensland Government and local councils. Following those discussions, the Queensland Support Package was announced by the Prime Minister in February 2013.

In 2013 Ludwig unveiled three policies for agriculture, fisheries and forestry. The Farm Finance package was released in Townsville with the Deputy Prime Minister Wayne Swan after direct meetings with farm groups and finance providers. In May the National Drought Reform Program agreement was signed between the Federal Government and all states and territories, bringing long standing discussions to a close. Ludwig said that it would end an old system that was unfair. Finally, Ludwig launched the National Food Plan in late May 2013, providing a roadmap for Australia's future food to support increased exports and global demand for Australian food.

Ludwig resigned from the Cabinet following the June 2013 leadership spill after supporting Julia Gillard. He issued a statement to advise that he would not take an appointment to the Cabinet under the leadership of Kevin Rudd in 'good faith' to the party and the leadership. Ludwig stated that he was proud of his achievements and the achievements of the Labor government.

On 9 March 2015 Ludwig announced he would not contest the next Senate election. His Senate term ended at the double dissolution of 9 May 2016.

== See also ==
- First Rudd Ministry
- First Gillard Ministry
- Second Gillard Ministry

Political offices
Preceded by Chris Ellison	Minister for Human Services; 2007–2010	Succeeded by Chris Bowen
Preceded by John Faulkner	Special Minister of State; 2009–2010	Succeeded by Gary Gray
Preceded by John Faulkner	Cabinet Secretary; 2009–2010	Succeeded by Mark Dreyfus
Preceded by Tony Burke	Minister for Agriculture, Fisheries and Forestry; 2010–2013	Succeeded by Joel Fitzgibbon
