= Nick Minchin =

Australian politician (born 1953)

The Honourable Nick Minchin AO
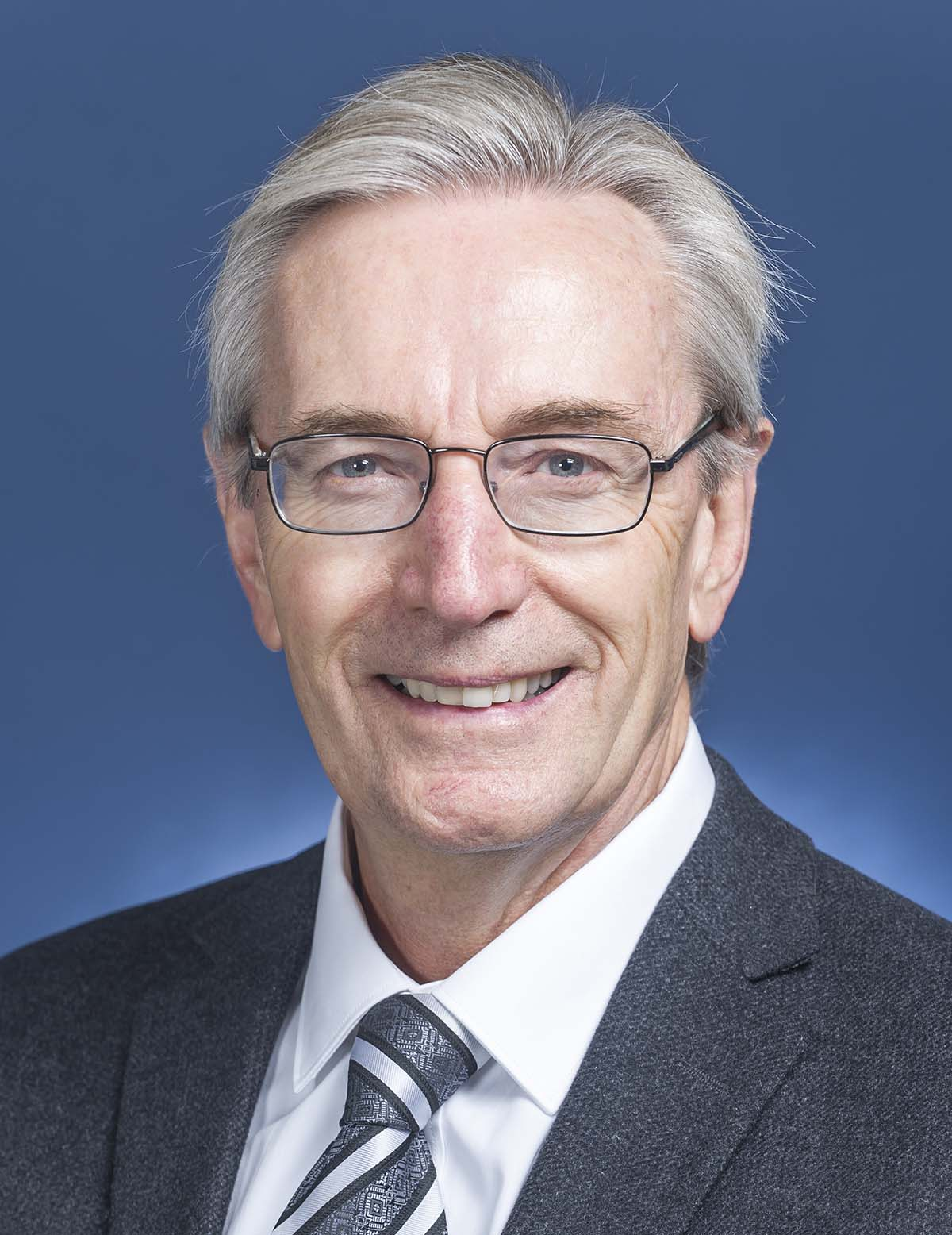

Leader of the Opposition in the Senate
- In office 3 December 2007 – 3 May 2010
- Deputy: Eric Abetz
- Leader: Brendan Nelson; Malcolm Turnbull; Tony Abbott
- Preceded by: Chris Evans
- Succeeded by: Eric Abetz

Leader of the Government in the Senate
- In office 27 January 2006 – 3 December 2007
- Prime Minister: John Howard
- Deputy: Helen Coonan
- Preceded by: Robert Hill
- Succeeded by: Chris Evans

Vice-President of the Executive Council
- In office 18 July 2004 – 3 December 2007
- Prime Minister: John Howard
- Preceded by: David Kemp
- Succeeded by: John Faulkner

Minister for Finance and Administration
- In office 26 November 2001 – 3 December 2007
- Prime Minister: John Howard
- Preceded by: John Fahey
- Succeeded by: Lindsay Tanner

Minister for Industry, Science and Resources
- In office 21 October 1998 – 26 November 2001
- Prime Minister: John Howard
- Preceded by: John Moore as Minister for Industry, Science and Technology; Warwick Parer as Minister for Resources and Energy
- Succeeded by: Ian Macfarlane as Minister for Industry, Tourism and Resources; Peter McGauran as Minister for Science

Special Minister of State
- In office 9 October 1997 – 21 October 1998
- Prime Minister: John Howard
- Preceded by: No immediate predecessor
- Succeeded by: Chris Ellison

Senator for South Australia
- In office 1 July 1993 – 30 June 2011
- Preceded by: Graham Maguire

Personal details
- Born: 15 April 1953 (age 73) Sydney
- Party: Liberal Party of Australia
- Spouse: Kerry Wakefield
- Education: Australian National University (BEc, LLB)
- Profession: Lawyer

Nicholas Hugh Minchin AO (born 15 April 1953) is an Australian former politician and former Australian Consul-General in New York. He previously served as a Liberal member of the Australian Senate representing South Australia from July 1993 to June 2011, and a former cabinet minister in the Howard government.

== Early life and education ==
Minchin was born in Sydney and was educated at the Australian National University, Canberra, where he gained degrees in law and economics. Minchin attended Knox Grammar School and spent a year in the United States as an exchange student with AFS International Scholarships. While at university, he was a resident of Burgmann College at the same time as Peter Garrett. He was a solicitor before entering politics.

== Political career ==
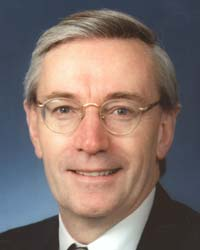
Minchin during his time in the Senate.

Minchin was a staff member for the Liberal Party's Federal Secretariat 1977–83, Deputy Federal Director of the Liberal Party in 1983, South Australian State Director and Campaign Director of the Liberal Party 1985–93. On 13 March 1993, Minchin was elected to the Australian Senate for South Australia, with his term starting on 1 July.

Minchin was a member of the Opposition Shadow Ministry 1994–96, holding the position of Parliamentary Secretary to the Leader of the Opposition, John Howard. He was Parliamentary Secretary to the Prime Minister John Howard 1996–97, Special Minister of State and Minister Assisting the Prime Minister 1997–98, and Minister for Industry, Science and Resources 1998–2001, with a seat in the Cabinet. He was Minister for Finance and Administration from November 2001 until the defeat of the Howard government at the 2007 federal election. Until that election he also held the posts of Leader of the Government in the Senate and Vice-President of the Executive Council.

Minchin was a right faction leader in the Liberal Party, and supported the abolition of Australia's compulsory voting system, on the stated basis that "compulsory voting is a fundamental breach of ... civil liberties". He supported states' rights in Cabinet. As Leader of the Government in the Senate he played a significant role in pursuing and defending its reforms of the Senate committee system, implemented in 2006 following his government's success in securing a majority of Senate seats at the 2004 election.

=== Retirement ===
Minchin announced on 24 March 2010 that he would not be contesting his Senate seat at the next Australian federal election. His term ended on 30 June 2011. He also resigned his Opposition portfolios and addressed the media saying that: "I love politics. This is not an easy decision to make ... when something like that happens and when one of your children, quite frankly, has a near-death experience, it does make you reassess your life and your priorities". His son, Oliver was seriously injured in a boat accident while training with the Australian Defence Force Academy in February 2010.

== After politics ==
On 14 February 2014 Minchin was appointed to the role of Australian consul-general in New York, which he held until May 2017. His appointment followed the controversial termination of the Labor-appointed nominee to the position, Steve Bracks (the former Premier of Victoria), by the incoming Abbott government in September 2013.

In 2018 Minchin was appointed to a five-year term on the Foreign Investment Review Board.

== Policy positions ==
Minchin has been a strong proponent of privatisation and wholesale labour market deregulation. He has defended the full privatisation of Telstra, and argued that the Commonwealth should sell its Telstra shares to buy a portfolio of other income-earning investments rather than spend the profits on national infrastructure.

In March 2006, Minchin received extensive media coverage when he highlighted the dilemma his government faced in the field of industrial relations and aired his views about future policy proposals. Speaking at a conference of the H. R. Nicholls Society where he told the audience that the coalition "knew its reform to WorkChoices were not popular but the process of change must continue", and that "there is still a long way to go... awards, the IR commission, all the rest of it...", he went on to say "The fact is the great majority of the Australian people do not support what we are doing on industrial relations. They violently disagree."

=== Tobacco ===
In 1995 Minchin submitted a dissenting Senate report on the tobacco industry and the costs of tobacco-related illness that disputed the committee's statements that it believes cigarettes are addictive and that passive smoking is harmful. Minchin claimed the tobacco industry was over-regulated. He also disagreed with the conclusions about the addictiveness of nicotine and the harmfulness of passive smoking:

Senator Minchin wishes to record his dissent from the committee's statements that it believes cigarettes are addictive and that passive smoking causes a number of adverse health effects for non-smokers. Senator Minchin believes these claims (the harmful effects of passive smoking) are not yet conclusively proved ... there is insufficient evidence to link passive smoking with a range of adverse health effects.

— Nick Minchin, Senate Committee's Minority Report on Tobacco-related Illnesses

A 2009 article in The Australian drew parallels between his stance on tobacco and his stance as a global warming denial.

In 2007, Minchin admitted to smoking cannabis at high school and university.

=== Climate change ===
In a March 2007 letter to the founder of Clean Up Australia, Ian Kiernan, Minchin expressed doubts that climate change was caused by human activity. In the letter, Minchin cited the writings of the Canadian newspaper columnist Lawrence Solomon, who in turn cited the disputed theories of Danish scientist Henrik Svensmark. Minchin said that the ETS bill was "the work of madman" and an "abomination", and observed that "Mr Rudd's arrogance and vanity in wanting to lead the world in cutting CO_{2} emissions is really sickening".

Minchin campaigned against an emissions trading scheme (ETS) bill.

On 22 September 2008, the parliamentary leader of the Liberal Party, Malcolm Turnbull, appointed Minchin as Shadow Minister for Broadband, Communications and the Digital Economy, and Leader of the Opposition in the Senate. Minchin had been previously Shadow Minister for Defence. However, on 26 November 2009, Minchin resigned from the shadow cabinet in protest at Turnbull's position on the government's emissions trading scheme.

Turnbull later stated on ABC Radio that, according to Minchin, "the world is not warming, it's cooling and the climate change issue is part of a vast left-wing conspiracy to deindustrialise the world".

=== Nuclear fuel cycle ===
As Minister for Industry Science and Resources (1998–2001), Minchin became the first Commonwealth minister to have had responsibility for the entire nuclear fuel cycle. Activity at this time included uranium mining, management of Australia's only nuclear reactor and the management of radioactive waste. During this period, Minchin approved the Beverley uranium mine in South Australia, commissioned a replacement research reactor at Lucas Heights and identified a future site for a national radioactive waste repository. In his valedictory speech, Minchin reflected on this period, saying:

"Responsibility for all matters radioactive was certainly testing... I failed in my responsibility to establish a national radioactive waste repository in the central north of South Australia, one of the best sites in the world for such a facility."

== Personal life ==
Nick Minchin is a distant cousin of Australian comedian Tim Minchin. His wife, Kerry Wakefield, is a journalist and blogger who writes for The Spectator and is on the advisory council of Advance Australia. They married in 1984, having met while she was working in the Canberra press gallery when her boyfriend was Peter Garrett.

== Bibliography ==
- Minchin, N. (1996) 'A Denial of Rights, A Detriment to Democracy', The Parliamentarian, 77(3) : 244–248.

Political offices
Preceded by Gary Johns	Special Minister of State; 1996–98	Succeeded by Chris Ellison
Preceded by John Moore as Minister for Industry, Science and Technology	Minister for Industry, Science and Resources; 1998–2001	Succeeded by Ian Macfarlane as Minister for Industry, Tourism and Resources
Preceded by Warwick Parer as Minister for Resources and Energy	Minister for Industry, Science and Resources; 1998–2001	Succeeded by Peter McGauran as Minister for Science
Preceded by John Fahey	Minister for Finance and Administration; 2001–07	Succeeded by Lindsay Tanner
Preceded by David Kemp	Vice-President of the Executive Council; 2004–07	Succeeded by John Faulkner
Party political offices
Preceded by Robert Hill	Leader of the Liberal Party in the Senate; 2006–2010	Succeeded by Eric Abetz
Diplomatic posts
Preceded by Steve Bracks	Australian Consul-General in New York; 2014–	Incumbent
