= Special Minister of State =

Australian cabinet position

- Commonwealth Coat of Arms

- Flag of Australia

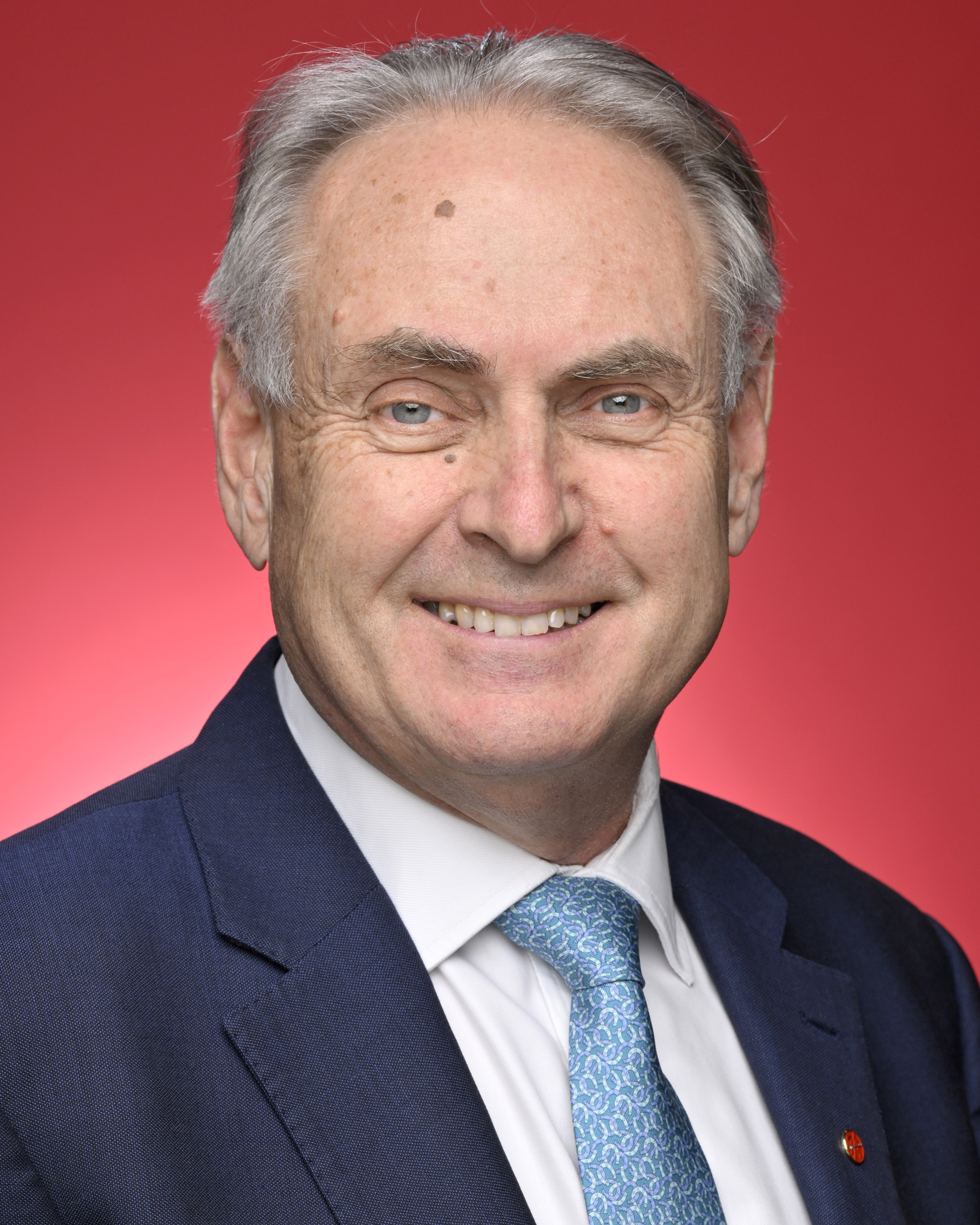
- Incumbent; Don Farrell since 1 June 2022
- Department of Finance
- Style: The Honourable
- Appointer: Governor-General on the advice of the prime minister
- Inaugural holder: Don Willesee
- Formation: 19 December 1972
- Website: www.smos.gov.au

The Special Minister of State (SMOS) in the Government of the Commonwealth of Australia is a position currently held by Don Farrell since 1 June 2022, following the Australian federal election in 2022. The minister is responsible for various parliamentary, electoral, financial, public service, and oversight affairs.

== Scope ==
The Special Minister of State administers their portfolio through the Department of Finance and a range of other government agencies, including:

- Asset Management and Parliamentary Services (Government Business, Special Claims and Land Policy Division, Property and Construction Division & Ministerial and Parliamentary Services)
- Australian Electoral Commission
- Australian Government Information Management Office (Policy and Planning Divisions & the Agency Services Division)
- Australian National Audit Office
- Australian Public Service Commission
- Commonwealth Ombudsman
- Electoral Reform
- Government Advertising
- Parliamentary Integrity
- Public Interests Disclosure
- Register of Lobbyists
- Remuneration Tribunal

== List of Special Ministers of State ==
The following individuals have been appointed as Special Ministers of State, or any of its precedent titles:

Order	Minister	Party	Prime Minister	Title	Term start	Term end	Term in office
1	Don Willesee	Labor	Whitlam	Special Minister of State	19 December 1972	30 November 1973	346 days
2	Lionel Bowen	Labor	Whitlam	Special Minister of State	30 November 1973	6 June 1975	1 year, 188 days
3	Doug McClelland	Labor	Whitlam	Special Minister of State	6 June 1975	11 November 1975	158 days
4	Reg Withers	Liberal	Fraser	Special Minister of State	11 November 1975	22 December 1975	41 days
5	Mick Young	Labor	Hawke	Special Minister of State	11 March 1983	14 July 1983	125 days
6	Kim Beazley	Labor	Hawke	Special Minister of State	14 July 1983	21 January 1984	191 days
n/a	Mick Young	Labor	Hawke	Special Minister of State	21 January 1984	16 February 1987	3 years, 26 days
7	Michael Tate	Labor	Hawke	Special Minister of State	16 February 1987	24 July 1987	158 days
8	Susan Ryan	Labor	Hawke	Special Minister of State	24 July 1987	19 January 1988	179 days
9	Frank Walker	Labor	Keating	Special Minister of State	24 March 1993	25 March 1994	1 year, 1 day
10	Gary Johns	Labor	Keating	Special Minister of State	25 March 1994	11 March 1996	1 year, 352 days
11	Nick Minchin	Liberal	Howard	Special Minister of State	9 October 1997	21 October 1998	1 year, 12 days
12	Chris Ellison	Liberal	Howard	Special Minister of State	21 October 1998	30 January 2001	2 years, 101 days
13	Eric Abetz	Liberal	Howard	Special Minister of State	30 January 2001	27 January 2006	4 years, 362 days
14	Gary Nairn	Liberal	Howard	Special Minister of State	27 January 2006	3 December 2007	1 year, 310 days
15	John Faulkner	Labor	Rudd	Special Minister of State	3 December 2007	9 June 2009	1 year, 188 days
16	Joe Ludwig	Labor	Rudd	Special Minister of State	9 June 2009	24 June 2010	1 year, 97 days
16	Joe Ludwig	Labor	Gillard	Special Minister of State	24 June 2010	14 September 2010	1 year, 97 days
17	Gary Gray	Labor	Gillard	Special Minister of State	14 September 2010	25 March 2013	2 years, 192 days
18	Mark Dreyfus	Labor	Gillard	Special Minister of State	25 March 2013	27 June 2013	177 days
18	Mark Dreyfus	Labor	Rudd	Special Minister of State	27 June 2013	18 September 2013	177 days
19	Michael Ronaldson	Liberal	Abbott	Special Minister of State	18 September 2013	15 September 2015	2 years, 3 days
19	Michael Ronaldson	Liberal	Turnbull	Special Minister of State	15 September 2015	21 September 2015	2 years, 3 days
20	Mal Brough	Liberal	Turnbull	Special Minister of State	21 September 2015	29 December 2015	99 days
21	Mathias Cormann	Liberal	Turnbull	Special Minister of State	29 December 2015	19 July 2016	203 days
22	Scott Ryan	Liberal	Turnbull	Special Minister of State	19 July 2016	13 November 2017	1 year, 117 days
n/a	Mathias Cormann	Liberal	Turnbull	Special Minister of State	13 November 2017	23 August 2018	283 days
23	Alex Hawke	Liberal	Morrison	Special Minister of State	28 August 2018	29 May 2019	274 days
n/a	Mathias Cormann	Liberal	Morrison	Special Minister of State	29 May 2019	30 October 2020	1 year, 154 days
24	Simon Birmingham	Liberal	Morrison	Special Minister of State	30 October 2020	8 October 2021	343 days
25	Ben Morton	Liberal	Morrison	Special Minister of State	8 October 2021	23 May 2022	227 days
26	Don Farrell	Labor	Albanese	Special Minister of State	1 June 2022	Incumbent	4 years, 100 days
