= Candidates of the 1993 Australian federal election =

This article provides information on candidates who stood for the 1993 Australian federal election. The election was held on 13 March 1993.

== Redistributions and seat changes ==
- Redistributions of electoral boundaries occurred in New South Wales, Queensland and South Australia.
  - In New South Wales, the National-held seat of Riverina-Darling was renamed Riverina, and the Labor-held seat of St George was renamed Watson. The Liberal-held seat of Dundas and the Labor-held seat of Phillip were abolished. The notionally Labor seat of Paterson was created.
    - The member for Dundas, Philip Ruddock (Liberal), contested Berowra.
    - The member for Grayndler, Leo McLeay (Labor), contested Watson.
    - The member for Macarthur, Stephen Martin (Labor), contested Cunningham.
    - The member for Phillip, Jeannette McHugh (Labor), contested Grayndler.
    - The member for Riverina-Darling, Noel Hicks (National), contested Riverina.
  - In Queensland, the notionally Labor seat of Dickson was created. The Labor-held seat of Fisher became notionally Liberal.
    - The member for Fisher, Michael Lavarch (Labor), contested Dickson.
  - In South Australia, the Liberal-held seat of Hawker was abolished.
    - The member for Hawker, Chris Gallus (Liberal), contested Hindmarsh.

== Retiring Members and Senators ==
=== Labor ===
- Ric Charlesworth MP (Perth, WA)
- Elaine Darling MP (Lilley, Qld)
- Stephen Dubois MP (St George, NSW)
- John Gayler MP (Leichhardt, Qld)
- Gerry Hand MP (Melbourne, Vic)
- Lloyd O'Neil MP (Grey, SA)
- Gordon Scholes MP (Corio, Vic)
- John Scott MP (Hindmarsh, SA)
- Stewart West MP (Cunningham, NSW)
- Senator John Button (Vic)
- Senator Patricia Giles (WA)
- Senator Peter Walsh (WA)

=== Liberal ===
- Max Burr MP (Lyons, Tas)
- Ewen Cameron MP (Indi, Vic)
- Fred Chaney MP (Pearce, WA)
- Harry Edwards MP (Berowra, NSW)
- Wal Fife MP (Hume, NSW)
- Bruce Goodluck MP (Franklin, Tas)
- Peter Shack MP (Tangney, WA)
- Ian Wilson MP (Sturt, SA)
- Senator Peter Durack (WA)
- Senator Austin Lewis (Vic)
- Senator Shirley Walters (Tas)

=== National ===
- Bruce Cowan MP (Lyne, NSW)
- Peter Fisher MP (Mallee, Vic)
- Senator Florence Bjelke-Petersen (Qld)

== House of Representatives ==
Sitting members at the time of the election are shown in bold text. Successful candidates are highlighted in the relevant colour. Where there is possible confusion, an asterisk (*) is also used.

=== Australian Capital Territory ===
Electorate	Held by	Labor candidate	Liberal candidate	Democrats candidate	Other candidates
Canberra	Labor	**Ros Kelly**	Bill Stefaniak	Peter Myers	Greg Adamson (GDA); Sally Kelly (NLP); Mike Trevethan (ASG)
Fraser	Labor	**John Langmore**	Martin Dunn	Greg Kramer	Sue Bolton (Ind); Emile Brunoro (Ind); David Eastman (Ind); Andrew Gordon (NLP); Peter Joseph (Ind); Kev Wise (Ind)

=== New South Wales ===
Electorate	Held by	Labor candidate	Coalition candidate	Democrats candidate	CTA candidate	Other candidates
Banks	Labor	**Daryl Melham**	Clive Taylor (Lib)	Peter Farleigh	Paul Davaris	John Hay (Ind); Deborah Kirkman (Ind)
Barton	Labor	**Gary Punch**	Phil White (Lib)	Troy Anderson	Cathy Mudie	Paul Balding (Ind); Ross Green (Ind); Norm McGarry (Ind); Dafna O'Neill (NLP)
Bennelong	Liberal	Monique Rotik	**John Howard** (Lib)	Suzanne Reddy		Geoff Dalgleish (Ind); John Dawson (Ind); Michael Roylance (NLP)
Berowra	Liberal	Sue Deane	**Philip Ruddock** (Lib)			Timothy Carr (NLP); Mick Gallagher (Ind)
Blaxland	Labor	**Paul Keating**	Les Osmond (Lib)	Peter Hennessy	Trevor Carrick	Marcus Aussie-Stone (Ind); Jon Hillman (Ind); Wilfred Kelvin (Ind); Peter O'Neill (NLP); Bob Reid (Ind); Linda Tenenbaum (Ind)
Bradfield	Liberal	Simon Jeans	**David Connolly** (Lib)	Bob Springett		Mark Courtney-Holland (NLP)
Calare	Labor	**David Simmons**	Ron Penny (Nat); John Staal (Lib)			Robert Cianfranco (Ind); Brian Davis (Ind)
Charlton	Labor	**Bob Brown**	Laurence Brewster (Lib)	Lyn Godfrey	Mick Sandford	John Baldwin (Ind); Zdenek Kviz (NLP); Charley Sievers (Ind); Ryan Wilson (Ind)
Chifley	Labor	**Roger Price**	Jennifer Mackenzie (Lib)			Yabu Bilyana (Ind); Joe Bryant (EFF); F Ivor (Ind); Tom Kumar (Ind)
Cook	Liberal	Noreen Solomon	**Don Dobie** (Lib)	Terri Richardson	Warren Kinny	Julie Atkinson (NLP); Alex Elphinston (Ind); Tom Thompson (CAP)
Cowper	National	Paul Sekfy	**Garry Nehl** (Nat)	Trevor Pike		Jillian Cranny (Grn); Roy Forrester (NLP); Nigel Gleeson (CEC); Darrell Wallbridge (CAP)
Cunningham	Labor	**Stephen Martin**	Ralph Lynch (Lib)	Daniela Reverberi	Robert O'Neill	Carole Medcalf (Grn); Fred Misdom (NLP); Meg Sampson (Ind); Michael West (Ind)
Dobell	Labor	**Michael Lee**	Bob Baldwin (Lib)	Brian Day		Bob Hudson (Ind)
Eden-Monaro	Labor	**Jim Snow**	Tom Barry (Nat); Rob de Fegeley (Lib)			Greg Doyle (Ind); Peter Fraser (NLP); Norm Sanders (Ind)
Farrer	National	Bill Higgins	**Tim Fischer** (Nat)	Ian McKenzie		
Fowler	Labor	**Ted Grace**	Gloria Arora (Lib)			Nicholas Hyde (NLP); Greg Josling (Ind); Mark Stevens (Ind)
Gilmore	National	Peter Knott	Max Atkins (Nat); Bill Eddy (Lib)	Greg Butler		Ruth Devenney (Ind); Rosemary Keighley (NLP); May Leatch (Grn); Jeff Stanborough (Ind)
Grayndler	Labor	**Jeannette McHugh**	Kevin Robinson (Lib)	Peter Markham	Clay Wilson	Paul Fitzgerald (Grn); Peter Johnston (NLP); Marnie Kennedy (Ind); Lee Pepper (Ind); Jack Shanahan (Ind)
Greenway	Labor	**Russ Gorman**	Ray Morris (Lib)	Bill Clancy	John Jerrow	Ray Alsop (NLP)
Gwydir	National	Ted Stubbins	**John Anderson** (Nat)			Jim Perrett (CAP)
Hughes	Labor	**Robert Tickner**	Noel Short (Lib)	June Young	Colin Scott	Joanne Buckley (Ind); Sue Gunning (Ind); Carol Maher (NLP)
Hume	National	Phil Archer	**John Sharp*** (Nat); Stephen Ward (Lib)	Ian Buchanan		Dave Cox (Ind)
Hunter	Labor	**Eric Fitzgibbon**	Chris Barnes (Lib); Bruce Crossing (Nat)			Robert Walker (NLP)
Kingsford-Smith	Labor	**Laurie Brereton**	Patricia Marsland (Lib)	Andrew Larcos		Warwick Dove (Ind); Murray Matson (Grn); Philip Pearson (NLP)
Lindsay	Labor	**Ross Free**	Carolynn Bellantonio (Lib)		Brian Grigg	
Lowe	Labor	Mary Easson	**Bob Woods** (Lib)	Jeff Meikle	Peter Peterson	Kate Cummings (Ind); Richard Eager (NLP); Erika Jones (AAFI); Erik Lowry (Ind); Anthony Panzarino (Ind); Bruce Threlfo (Grn); Peter Woods (Ind)
Lyne	National	Dennis Driver	John Barrett (Lib); Mark Vaile* (Nat)	John Stokes		Marje Rowsell (EFF)
Macarthur	Labor	Chris Haviland	Ron Forrester (Lib)			Herb Bethune (Ind); Peter Gadsby (Ind)
Mackellar	Liberal	Charles Wild	**Jim Carlton** (Lib)	Brian Johnson	Lesley Maher	Valdamar Kurylenko (NLP)
Macquarie	Liberal	Maggie Deahm	**Alasdair Webster** (Lib)	Jon Rickard		Roger Fay (NLP); Garth Hutchinson (Ind); Petar Ivanovski (Grn)
Mitchell	Liberal	Julie Kanaghines	**Alan Cadman** (Lib)	Roger Posgate		Charles Anderson (CAP)
Newcastle	Labor	**Allan Morris**	Glenn Turner (Lib)	Greg Baines	Jim Kendall	Frank Blefari (Ind); Lewina Jackson (Ind); Ivan Welsh (Ind); James Whelan (Grn)
New England	National	Chris Watt	**Ian Sinclair** (Nat)			Glen Hausfield (Ind); Warren Woodgate (Ind)
North Sydney	Independent	Richard Elstone	Bruce McNeilly (Lib)			Stuart Carraill (Ind); **Ted Mack*** (Ind); Ian Stokes (NLP)
Page	Labor	**Harry Woods**	Mike Emerson (Nat); Malcolm Marshall (Lib)	Deborah Inglis		Elle Fikke (Grn); Ros Irwin (Ind); Graeme Lean (Ind); Lindsay Olen (CAP); Rhondda O'Neill (Ind); Antoinette Perry (NLP)
Parkes	National	Barry Brebner	**Michael Cobb** (Nat)	Noel Plumb		David McLennan (NLP); Terrence Seton (Ind)
Parramatta	Labor	**Paul Elliott**	Max Rawnsley (Lib)	Bill Rosier	John Shields	Rodney Forshaw (NLP); Sam Papadopoulos (Ind); John Wilson (CAP)
Paterson	Liberal	Bob Horne	Bob Roberts (Lib); Gary Watson (Nat)	Rodger Riach		Ron Franks (CAP); Alan McDonald (NLP); Bruce MacKenzie (Ind); Bernie Neville (Ind); Bernadette Smith (Grn)
Prospect	Labor	**Janice Crosio**	Paul Newton (Lib)	Dick Pike		Sue Bull (Ind); Alan Byers (Ind); Norman Byleveld (Ind); Reg Paling (NLP)
Reid	Labor	**Laurie Ferguson**	Eyup Guner (Lib)			Stephen Doric (NLP); Carmel Emtage (Ind); Paul Locke (Ind); Jennifer Long (Grn)
Richmond	Labor	**Neville Newell**	Larry Anthony (Nat); Bruce Francis (Lib)	Eddy Kemp		Fred Crooks (CAP); Hugh Ermacora (Ind); Josephine Faith (Grn); Moira Grayndler (NLP); Christopher McIlwrath (Ind)
Riverina	National	Pat Brassil	Bill Heffernan (Lib); **Noel Hicks*** (Nat)			Paul Meredith (Ind); Margaret ter Haar (NLP)
Robertson	Labor	**Frank Walker**	Mike Gallacher (Lib)	Glenice Griffiths		Beth Eager (NLP); Bryan Ellis (Grn)
Shortland	Labor	**Peter Morris**	Laurie Coghlan (Lib)	Michael Reckenberg	Ivan Morrow	Terry Cook (Ind); Geoff Payne (Ind); Brett Randall (NLP)
Sydney	Labor	**Peter Baldwin**	James Fisher (Lib)	Bob Dawson		Mark Berriman (Grn); Margaret Gleeson (Ind); Bronia Hatfield (NLP); Donald O'Halloran (Ind)
Throsby	Labor	**Colin Hollis**	Peter Josevski (Lib)	Tom Hadley	Brian Hughes	Richard Barnes (NLP); Rex Connor (RCL); Dragan Grijak (Ind); David Hughes (AAFI); Margaret Perrott (Ind); Karla Sperling (Grn)
Warringah	Liberal	Steve Cannane	**Michael MacKellar** (Lib)	Simon Disney		Catherine Knowles (NLP); Hugh Walker (Ind)
Watson	Labor	**Leo McLeay**	Bernard O'Bree (Lib)	Amelia Newman		M. Chaplin (NLP); Col Harding (EFF); Brian Meyer (Ind); George Tsirkas (Ind)
Wentworth	Liberal	Paul Pearce	**John Hewson** (Lib)	Armon Hicks		Zanny Begg (Ind); Patricia Boland (NLP); Susan Durovic (Ind); Ben Oquist (Grn)
Werriwa	Labor	**John Kerin**	Rick Lewis (Lib)	Peter Fraser		Julie Chamberlain (NLP)

=== Northern Territory ===
Electorate	Held by	Labor candidate	CLP candidate
Northern Territory	Labor	**Warren Snowdon**	Arthur Palmer

=== Queensland ===
Electorate	Held by	Labor candidate	Liberal candidate	National candidate	Democrats candidate	Greens candidate	Other candidates
Bowman	Labor	**Con Sciacca**	Debra Wardle	Nigel Marsh	Murray Henman	Frank Bickle	Kevin Hendstock (CAP); Mark McLaren (Ind); Richard May (Ind); Bill Wheeler (Ind)
Brisbane	Labor	**Arch Bevis**	Neil Ennis	Justin Choveaux	Kerri Kellett	Lou Gugenberger	Mariusz Chojnacki (Ind); Robert Doring (CAP); M. P. Gibson (Ind); Susan Price (Ind); Valerie Thurlow (NLP); Tom Veivers (Ind)
Capricornia	Labor	Marjorie Henzell	Chris Alroe	Margaret Goody	Fay Lawrence	Bob Muir	David Bridgeman (Ind); Mavis Hinton (CAP); Jim Rundle (Ind); Cameron Smyth (Ind); Bevan Tull (AIP); **Keith Wright** (Ind)
Dawson	National	Frank Gilbert	John Mansell	**Ray Braithwaite**	Steve Quadrio	Ian Fox	Neil Heiniger (Ind); Bob McCulloch (CAP); Michelle MacNevin (Ind)
Dickson (deferred)	Labor	**Michael Lavarch**	Bruce Flegg	Trevor St Baker	Glen Spicer	Desiree Mahoney	Mal Beard (CAP); Leonard Matthews (Ind); Walter Pegler (Ind) [died]
Dickson (supplementary)	Labor	**Michael Lavarch**	Bruce Flegg	Trevor St Baker	Glen Spicer	Desiree Mahoney	Alan Bawden (Ind); Mal Beard (CAP); Michael Darby (Ind); Leonard Matthews (Ind)
Fadden	Liberal	Peter Eldon	**David Jull**	Iona Abrahamson	Leonie Sanders	Harry Darville	Otto Kuhne (NLP); Shaun Matheson (AIP); Joe Ross (CAP)
Fairfax	Liberal	Kerry Orton	**Alex Somlyay**	Gordon Simpson	Elizabeth Oss-Emer	Peter Parnell	Santo Ferraro (CAP); John Henderson (Ind); Keith Valentine (NLP)
Fisher	Liberal	Ian Burgett	Peter Slipper	Winston Johnston	Digby Jakeman	Chris Gwin	Jeff Johnson (CAP); Chris Savage (Ind); Sam Watson (AIP)
Forde	Labor	**Mary Crawford**	Jim Planincic	Peter Flaws	Alan Dickson	Barry Stark	Marion Corbley (CAP)
Griffith	Labor	**Ben Humphreys**	Mick Privitera	David Stone	Gavin Kernot	Barry Wilson	Stephen Dickson (Ind); Maxine Weston (NLP); Coral Wynter (Ind)
Groom	Liberal	Ray Webber	**Bill Taylor**	Joe Hanna	Alan May	Carey Harrison	Garry Berghofer (CAP); Wally McCarthy (AIP)
Herbert	Labor	**Ted Lindsay**	Peter Hazard	Robyn Quick	Col Parker	Dave Kimble	Warren Harvey (CAP); Cilla Pryor (AIP); John Robinson (Ind); Bill Setter (Ind)
Hinkler	Labor	**Brian Courtice**	John Abbott	Paul Neville	Terry Clark	Lorrelle Campbell	Maurice Hetherington (CEC); Colin Johnson (AIP); Bill May (CAP)
Kennedy	Labor	**Rob Hulls**	Dave Cashmore	Bob Katter	Kevin Paine	Saeed de Ridder	Norman Johnson (AIP); Donald Logan (Ind); Bill Petrie (CAP)
Leichhardt	Labor	Peter Dodd	Bill Cummings	Ben Wilson	Giselle Thomas	Henrietta Fourmile	Jim Cavill (Ind); Dorothy McKenzie (NLP); Stephen Piper (Ind); Gavin Roberts (CAP)
Lilley	Labor	Wayne Swan	Bill Leveritt	Doug Foggo	Caroline Smith	Michelle Rielly	Frank Andrews (Ind); Andrew Coates (Ind); Cyril Dennison (Ind); Graham McDonald (CAP)
Maranoa	National	Anne Jones	Gerard Clarke	**Bruce Scott**	Danny Dutton	Sarah Moles	Andrew Chambers (CAP); Brian Hooper (Ind); Rose Turnbull (AIP)
McPherson	Liberal	Mark Whillans	**John Bradford**	Allan de Brenni	Jason Neville	Christine Lovison	Bruce Whiteside (CAP)
Moncrieff	Liberal	Bob Brown	**Kathy Sullivan**	Warren Pike	Jason Neville	Sally Mackinnon	Steven Stringer (CAP)
Moreton	Labor	**Garrie Gibson**	Margaret Steen	John Kearns	Ian Holland	D. C. Beattie-Burnett	Shane Dean (Ind); Martin Ebsworth (AIP); Rod Jeanneret (CAP); Jim O'Dempsey (Ind); Ira Smith (Ind)
Oxley	Labor	**Les Scott**	George Blain	Marie McCullagh	Mary Fernando-Pulle	Suzanne Gibbon	Geoff Abnett (CAP); Sue White (Ind); Les Wynne (Ind)
Petrie	Labor	**Gary Johns**	Alan Sherlock	Brendan Power	Zillah Jackson	Angela Jones	Jeff Gehrmann (Ind); Allan Mutch (CAP); Gina Neville (NLP)
Rankin	Labor	**David Beddall**	Sallyanne Atkinson	Marian Schwarz	Susan Werba	Richard Nielsen	Debbie Bell (Ind); Lester Reaves (CAP); Ian Reid (Ind)
Ryan	Liberal	Fleur Yuile	**John Moore**	Jim Gillan	Sid Young	Willy Bach	Mark Brady (NLP); Terry Madden (Ind); Alan Skyring (Ind); Les Smith (CAP)
Wide Bay	National	Judy Caplick	Trevor Hartshorne	**Warren Truss**	Marie Woodley	Lily Podger	Andrew Baker (CAP); Ray Smith (Ind)

=== South Australia ===
Electorate	Held by	Labor candidate	Liberal candidate	Democrats candidate	CTA candidate	Other candidates
Adelaide	Labor	**Bob Catley**	Trish Worth	Matthew Mitchell		David Bidstrup (Ind); Peter Fenwick (NLP); Adam Hanieh (Ind); Jack King (Ind); Chris Matuhina (Ind)
Barker	Liberal	Harry Early	**Ian McLachlan**	Regine Andersen	Deidre Kent	Francis Boylan (Ind); Chris Wells (NLP); Stephen Wikblom (Ind)
Bonython	Labor	**Neal Blewett**	Ian Brookfield	Colin Maas	Dennis Hood	Bruce Hannaford (Ind); Eamon McAleer (NLP); Tony Rocca (Ind)
Boothby	Liberal	Cathy Orr	**Steele Hall**	David Thackrah		Reg Macey (Ind); Bevan Morris (NLP)
Grey	Labor	Barry Piltz	Barry Wakelin	Matthew Rogers	Anne Wilson	George Crowe (Ind); John Fisher (Ind); Jeff Munchenberg (Ind); Rod Nettle (Nat); Roger Oates (CAP); Peter Solomon (Ind); Colin Vincent (NLP)
Hindmarsh	Labor	John Rau	**Chris Gallus**	Mark Lobban		Cliff Boyd (Ind); Ron Dean (Ind); Bob Lamb (Grn); Melanie Sjoberg (Ind); Martin Stretton (GP); Athena Yiossis (NLP)
Kingston	Labor	**Gordon Bilney**	Martin Gordon	Anji Gesserit	John Watson	Robert Brown (NLP); Egils Burtmanis (Ind); Robert Graham (Ind); Alexa Jamieson (Ind)
Makin	Labor	**Peter Duncan**	Alan Irving	Angela Smith	Dorothy Durland	Stan Batten (Ind); Susan Brown (NLP); Eva Dobson (Ind); Alf Taylor (Ind)
Mayo	Liberal	Patrick Scott	**Alexander Downer**	Merilyn Pedrick	Philippe Bayet	Michael Camilleri (Ind); Pamela Chipperfield (NLP); Elena Lomsargis (Ind)
Port Adelaide	Labor	**Rod Sawford**	Alan McCarthy	Don Knott		Emily Gilbey-Riley (GP); Andrew Hobbs (NLP); Bert Joy (Ind); Colin Shearing (Ind)
Sturt	Liberal	Marco de Chellis	Christopher Pyne	Elizabeth Williams	Tom Curnow	Geoff Freer (Ind); Vladimir Lorenzon (NLP); Mike Pratt (Ind)
Wakefield	Liberal	Mike Stevens	**Neil Andrew**	Roy Milne		Don Allen (Ind); Shirley Faulkner (Ind); Ingrid Hergstrom (NLP)

=== Tasmania ===
Electorate	Held by	Labor candidate	Liberal candidate	Democrats candidate	Greens candidate	Other candidates
Bass	Liberal	Silvia Smith	**Warwick Smith**	Brian Austen	David Hunnerup	
Braddon	Liberal	Mike Gard	**Chris Miles**	Jim Reilly	John Coombes	Royce Lohrey (Ind)
Denison	Labor	**Duncan Kerr**	Phil Ryan	Kevin Anderson	Bob Brown	Teresa Dowding (Ind); Euan Vance (CTA)
Franklin	Liberal	Harry Quick	Graeme Gilbert	James Richard	Louise Crossley	
Lyons	Liberal	Dick Adams	Rene Hidding	Leonie Godridge	Michael Morris	

=== Victoria ===
Electorate	Held by	Labor candidate	Coalition candidate	Democrats candidate	CTA candidate	Other candidates
Aston	Liberal	Sue Craven	**Peter Nugent** (Lib)	Damian Wise	Christine Chapman	Andrew Parry (NLP)
Ballarat	Liberal	Peter Devereux	**Michael Ronaldson** (Lib)	Rob de Caen	Jodie Rickard	Veronica Caven (NLP); Geoffrey Hardy (Ind)
Batman	Labor	**Brian Howe**	Mabel Thrupp (Lib)	Geoff Carr		Joan Dickins (NLP); Nigel D'Souza (Ind); Gordana Simatkovich (Ind)
Bendigo	Liberal	Joe Helper	**Bruce Reid** (Lib)	Don Semmens	Pamela Taylor	Doug Harrison (Ind); Sharon Hill (NLP); Julie Oberin (Ind)
Bruce	Liberal	Beverley Williams	**Julian Beale** (Lib)	Leslie Chandra		Nicolas Di Tempora (NLP)
Burke	Labor	**Neil O'Keefe**	Stephen Mitchell (Lib)	Iain Ralph	Ian Burrowes	Michael Dickens (NLP)
Calwell	Labor	**Andrew Theophanous**	Dianne Livett (Lib)	David Mackay		Sandy Price (NLP); Veronica Rodenburg (Ind); Rod Spencer (AAFI)
Casey	Liberal	Julie Warren	**Bob Halverson** (Lib)	Sam Ginsberg		Robert Kendi (NLP)
Chisholm	Liberal	Gordon McCaskie	**Michael Wooldridge** (Lib)	Doug Johnston		Richard Aldous (NLP)
Corangamite	Liberal	Bernard Eades	**Stewart McArthur** (Lib)	Greta Pearce	Terry Winter	Isaac Golden (NLP); Norm Powell (Ind); John Warnock (Ind)
Corinella	Liberal	Alan Griffin	**Russell Broadbent** (Lib)	Taylor Holst		Gary Nelson (NLP); Trudie Oldis (Ind); Predrag Pjanic (Ind)
Corio	Labor	Gavan O'Connor	John Tol (Lib)	Mike Martorana	Ian Winter	Aidan Bell (Ind); Carol Smith (NLP)
Deakin	Liberal	Greg Adkins	**Ken Aldred** (Lib)	Peter Magart	Alan Barron	William Backhouse (Ind); Robert Nieuwenhuis (NLP)
Dunkley	Liberal	Bob Chynoweth	**Frank Ford** (Lib)	Barrie Rowland-Hornblow		Bev Nelson (NLP)
Flinders	Liberal	Denise Hassert	**Peter Reith** (Lib)	Malcolm Brown		Jan Charlwood (NLP)
Gellibrand	Labor	**Ralph Willis**	Chris Macgregor (Lib)	Alan Parker	Peter Sanko	Nada Benson (Ind); Leon Staropoli (NLP)
Gippsland	National	Judith Stone	**Peter McGauran** (Nat)	Donal Storey		Ben Buckley (Ind); Bruce Phillips (Ind); Paul Van Baer (NLP)
Goldstein	Liberal	Martin Pakula	**David Kemp** (Lib)	Geoff Herbert		Brian Gale (NLP); James Ritchie (Ind)
Higgins	Liberal	Joe Cerritelli	**Peter Costello** (Lib)	Clive Jackson		Lesley Mendelson (NLP)
Holt	Labor	**Michael Duffy**	Barbara Lewis (Lib)	Michael Burns		Paul Blackburn (NLP); Stephen Nedeljkovic (Ind)
Hotham	Labor	**Simon Crean**	Robert Hicks (Lib)	Giancarlo Squillacciotti		Gabrielle De Wan (NLP); Sue Phillips (Ind); Petar Pjesivac (Ind)
Indi	Liberal	Jenny Luck	Lou Lieberman* (Lib); Philip Pullar (Nat)			Jeannette Martin (NLP)
Isaacs	Liberal	John McSwiney	**Rod Atkinson** (Lib)	Kaylyn Raynor		Judee Horin (NLP)
Jagajaga	Labor	**Peter Staples**	Alistair Urquhart (Lib)	Bob West	Doreen O'Kane	Richard Fitzherbert (Ind); Gary Foley (Ind); Sue Griffith (NLP); Eric Kirkwood (Ind); Chris Vassis (Ind); Angela Walker (AAFI)
Kooyong	Liberal	Wayne Clarke	**Andrew Peacock** (Lib)	David Zemdegs		David Greagg (Ind); Christine Harris (NLP)
Lalor	Labor	**Barry Jones**	Anne Canterbury (Lib)	Carla Stacey	Anthony Golding	Floyd Evans (NLP)
La Trobe	Liberal	Geoff Pain	**Bob Charles** (Lib)	Raymond Jungwirth	Wolfgang Voigt	Peter Herbert (EFF); Juliana Kendi (NLP); Rebecca Wigney (Grn)
Mallee	National	John Zigouras	John Forrest* (Nat); Adrian Kidd (Lib)	Christopher Stear		Andrew Lawson Kerr (NLP)
Maribyrnong	Labor	**Alan Griffiths**	Maureen Hopper (Lib)	Frances McKay		John Bell (NLP); George Marinkovic (Ind)
McEwen	Liberal	Peter Cleeland	**Fran Bailey** (Lib)	Geoff Mosley		Harry Grey (Ind); Julie Nihill (NLP)
McMillan	Liberal	Barry Cunningham	**John Riggall** (Lib)	David White		Cathy Boschin (NLP); Helen Hoppner (Ind); Glen Mann (Ind)
Melbourne	Labor	Lindsay Tanner	Riza Kozanoglu (Lib)	Dias Cooper		Larry Clarke (NLP); James Ferrari (Ind); Stevan Ivanov (Ind); Di Quin (Ind); Elvie Sievers (Ind)
Melbourne Ports	Labor	**Clyde Holding**	Helen Friedmann (Lib)	Beverley Broadbent		Andrew Colbert (Ind); Christine Craik (Ind); Caroline Hockley (NLP)
Menzies	Liberal	Peter De Angelis	**Kevin Andrews** (Lib)	John Dobinson		Denis Quinlan (NLP)
Murray	National	John Sheen	**Bruce Lloyd** (Nat)	Allan Thomson		Sonia Hyland (NLP); Dennis Lacey (Ind)
Scullin	Labor	**Harry Jenkins**	Barbara Smith (Lib)	John Georgievski		Jordan Grujovski (Ind); Neil Phillips (NLP); John Siddons (Ind); Don Veitch (CEC)
Wannon	Liberal	Richard Morrow	**David Hawker** (Lib)	Donald Anderson		Les Hemingway (Ind); Yasmin Horsham (NLP); John Philpot (Ind); David Wilson (Ind)
Wills	Independent	Bill Kardamitsis	Jack Minas (Lib)	Robert Stone		**Phil Cleary*** (Ind); Ken Mantell (Ind); Cecil G. Murgatroyd (Ind); John Price (NLP); Katheryne Savage (Ind)

=== Western Australia ===
Electorate	Held by	Labor candidate	Liberal candidate	Democrats candidate	Greens candidate	CTA candidate	Other candidates
Brand	Labor	**Wendy Fatin**	Adrian Fawcett	Ray Tilbury	Andrea Evans	Paul Cant	Norm Dicks (Ind); Jacqui Robinson (NLP)
Canning	Labor	**George Gear**	Ricky Johnston	Rosslyn Tilbury	Daniel Bessell	Gerard Goiran	Shirley de la Hunty (Ind); Patti Roberts (NLP)
Cowan	Labor	**Carolyn Jakobsen**	Richard Evans	Stewart Godden	Otto Dik		Suzan Miles (NLP)
Curtin	Liberal	David Gilchrist	**Allan Rocher**	Willem Bouwer	Elisabeth Jones		Diana Davies (NLP); Jon Doust (Ind)
Forrest	Liberal	Peter Procter	**Geoff Prosser**	David Churches	Jill Reading		
Fremantle	Labor	**John Dawkins**	John Papaphotis	Patrick Mullins	Mary Salter		Tom Haynes (NLP)
Kalgoorlie	Labor	**Graeme Campbell**	Don Green	Shyama Peebles	Robin Chapple		James O'Kenny (Ind); Byron Rigby (NLP)
Moore	Liberal	Christine Power	**Paul Filing**	Libby Brown	Stephen Magyar		Alex Novakovic (NLP)
O'Connor	Liberal	John Mason	**Wilson Tuckey**	Pat Howe	Anne Lambert		John Dunne (Ind); Jim Lee (Ind)
Pearce	Liberal	Patrick Jebb	Judi Moylan	Peter Lambert	Stephen Hall		Mark Forecast (Nat)
Perth	Labor	Stephen Smith	Barney Cresswell	Irene Knight	Patsy Molloy	Chris Bignell	Jennifer Benjamin (NLP); Peter Blurton (Ind); Michael Goff (Ind); Michelle Hovane (Ind)
Stirling	Labor	**Ron Edwards**	Eoin Cameron	Richard Jeffreys	Kate Boland		Cathryn D'Cruz (NLP); Dean Economou (Ind)
Swan	Labor	**Kim Beazley**	Bryan Hilbert	Don Millar	Andrew Thomson		Andrew Caminschi (Ind); Luke Garswood (Ind); Anne Leishman (NLP); Isobel Weir (Ind)
Tangney	Liberal	Jason Jordan	Daryl Williams	Don Bryant	Mark Sundancer	John Trenning	Ken Barrett (NLP)

== Senate ==
Sitting Senators are shown in bold text. Tickets that elected at least one Senator are highlighted in the relevant colour. Successful candidates are identified by an asterisk (*).

=== Australian Capital Territory ===
Two seats were up for election. The Labor Party was defending one seat. The Liberal Party was defending one seat.

Labor candidates	Liberal candidates	Democrats candidates	Greens candidates	NLP candidates	ASGC candidates	Ungrouped candidates
1. **Bob McMullan***; 2. Maureen Sheehan	1. **Margaret Reid***; 2. Lucinda Spier	1. Domenic Mico; 2. Peter Main	1. Kerrie Tucker; 2. David Turbayne	1. David Seaton; 2. Nanette Kerrison	1. Helen Miller; 2. Ute Ernst	Arthur Burns (AAFI); Bernard Collaery

=== New South Wales ===
Six seats were up for election. The Labor Party was defending three seats. The Liberal-National Coalition was defending two seats. The Australian Democrats were defending one seat. Senators Bronwyn Bishop (Liberal), Vicki Bourne (Democrats), David Brownhill (National), Bruce Childs (Labor), Stephen Loosley (Labor) and Sue West (Labor) were not up for re-election.

Labor candidates	Coalition candidates	Democrats candidates	Greens candidates	CTA candidates	Shooters candidates
1. **Graham Richardson***; 2. **John Faulkner***; 3. **Kerry Sibraa***; 4. Mary-Anne Armstrong	1. **Michael Baume*** (Lib); 2. **John Tierney*** (Lib); 3. Sandy Macdonald* (Nat); 4. Marise Payne (Lib)	1. **Karin Sowada**; 2. Ray Griffiths; 3. Arthur Chesterfield-Evans	1. Steve Brigham; 2. Joy Wallace; 3. Ian Cohen; 4. Cecily Stead	1. Bruce Coleman; 2. Graham McLennan; 3. Shirley Grigg; 4. Glen Ryan	1. Michael Ascher; 2. Ted Orr; 3. Jeff Wilkie; 4. Suzanne O'Connell; 5. Robyn Bourke
AAFI candidates	NLP candidates	Grey Power candidates	Green Alliance candidates	CEC candidates	Republican candidates
1. David Kitson; 2. Ian Weatherlake	1. Doreen Kerr; 2. Mike Smith; 3. Ines Judd	1. Frances Roylance; 2. Gay Grounds	1. Jane Beckmann; 2. Bernie Brian	1. Leone Hay; 2. Robert Butler; 3. Gloria Wood	1. Peter Consandine; 2. Gennie Klein
CAP candidates	Group E candidates	Group H candidates	Group J candidates	Group M candidates	Group Q candidates
1. John Uebergang; 2. Doug Hawkins	1. Leonard Teale; 2. Colin Ward	1. Patricia Poulos; 2. Peter Archer; 3. John Holley	1. O Santa Claus; 2. Lord Rolo	1. David Stevens; 2. Yvonne Harrison	1. Rosemarie Lavery; 2. Robert John; 3. Priscilla Lavery
Group S candidates	Group T candidates	Group U candidates	Ungrouped candidates		
1. Walter Bass; 2. Paul Hales	1. Michael Vescio; 2. Pamela Wheatley	1. Robert Schollbach; 2. Karen Stirling	Milorad Gajin; Michael Anderson; Katherine De Bry	Ron Poulsen; Bryan Ellis; Malcolm Milton	Dianne Decker; Argy Beletich

=== Northern Territory ===
Two seats were up for election. The Labor Party was defending one seat. The Country Liberal Party was defending one seat.

Labor candidates	CLP candidates
1. **Bob Collins***; 2. Patty Ring	1. **Grant Tambling***; 2. Bob Truman

=== Queensland ===
Six seats were up for election. The Labor Party was defending two seats. The Liberal Party was defending two seats. The National Party was defending two seats. Senators Ron Boswell (National), Bryant Burns (Labor), John Herron (Liberal), Gerry Jones (Labor), Cheryl Kernot (Democrats) and Ian Macdonald (Liberal) were not up for re-election.

Labor candidates	Liberal candidates	National candidates	Democrats candidates	Greens candidates	CTA candidates
1. **Margaret Reynolds***; 2. **Mal Colston***; 3. John Bird; 4. Ian McLean	1. **David MacGibbon***; 2. **Warwick Parer***; 3. Ross Cunningham; 4. Ann Buchanan; 5. Henry Bird; 6. Owen Davies	1. **Bill O'Chee***; 2. De-Anne Kelly; 3. Teresa Cobb	1. John Woodley*; 2. Jonathan Cornish; 3. Gayle Woodrow; 4. Tony Walters	1. Drew Hutton; 2. Colin Hunt; 3. Naomi Spencer	1. Alan Sims; 2. Rona Joyner
NLP candidates	AIP candidates	CAP candidates	Group E candidates	Group H candidates	Ungrouped candidates
1. Geoff Wilson; 2. Peter Jackson	1. Darby McCarthy; 2. Una Branfield	1. Perry Jewell; 2. Tony Pitt; 3. Sandra Hill; 4. Mark Geissmann; 5. Ryland Gill; 6. Richard Teague	1. Barry Weedon; 2. Margaret Crompton	1. Ronald Alford; 2. Sylvia Smith	Steve Dimitriou; John Koehler (CEC); Barry Garvey; Joe Sherlock; Christopher Beilby; Julie Warner (CEC)

=== South Australia ===
Six seats were up for election. The Labor Party was defending three seats. The Liberal Party was defending two seats. The Australian Democrats were defending one seat. Senators Grant Chapman (Liberal), John Coulter (Democrats), Rosemary Crowley (Labor), Robert Hill (Liberal), Chris Schacht (Labor) and Baden Teague (Liberal) were not up for re-election.

Labor candidates	Liberal candidates	Democrats candidates	Greens candidates	National candidates	CTA candidates
1. **Nick Bolkus***; 2. **Dominic Foreman***; 3. **Graham Maguire**; 4. Rosalie McDonald	1. **Amanda Vanstone***; 2. Nick Minchin*; 3. **Alan Ferguson***; 4. Satish Gupta	1. **Meg Lees***; 2. Stephen Swift; 3. Natasha Stott Despoja; 4. Patricia Tickle	1. Ally Fricker; 2. Gerhard Weissmann	1. Nola McCallum; 2. Michael Bradshaw	1. David Rodway; 2. David Squirrell
Republican candidates	NLP candidates	Grey Power candidates	AAFI candidates	EFF candidates	Group F candidates
1. Bilal Nasrullah; 2. Peter Hill	1. Geoff Wells; 2. Anne Martin; 3. Dulcie Morris	1. Jack Holder; 2. Betty Preston; 3. Glen Bottam	1. Evonne Moore; 2. Joe Smith	1. David Dwyer; 2. Douglas Giddings; 3. Vanessa Giddings	1. Alex Liew; 2. Douglas Schirripa
Ungrouped candidates					
Mark Rice; Bernard Broom; Ean Smith					

=== Tasmania ===
Six seats were up for election. The Labor Party was defending three seats. The Liberal Party was defending two seats. Independent Senator Brian Harradine was defending one seat. Senators Robert Bell (Democrats), Paul Calvert (Liberal), John Devereux (Labor), Jocelyn Newman (Liberal), Nick Sherry (Labor) and John Watson (Liberal) were not up for re-election.

Labor candidates	Liberal candidates	Democrats candidates	Greens candidates	Harradine candidates	CTA candidates
1. **Michael Tate***; 2. **John Coates***; 3. Shayne Murphy*; 4. **Terry Aulich**	1. **Brian Archer***; 2. Brian Gibson*; 3. Eric Abetz	1. Patsy Harmsen; 2. David Stephen	1. Judy Henderson; 2. Peter Jones; 3. Marion Fry	1. **Brian Harradine***	1. Philip Hopson; 2. Janelle Hopson
NLP candidates	TST candidates	Ungrouped candidates			
1. Greg Broszczyk; 2. Caroline Davies	1. Alan Sproule; 2. Frances McShane	Ian Jamieson			

=== Victoria ===
Six seats were up for election. The Labor Party was defending three seats. The Liberal-National Coalition was defending two seats. The Australian Democrats were defending one seat. Senators Richard Alston (Liberal), Barney Cooney (Labor), Rod Kemp (Liberal), Kay Patterson (Liberal), Robert Ray (Labor) and Sid Spindler (Democrats) were not up for re-election.

Labor candidates	Coalition candidates	Democrats candidates	Greens candidates	DLP candidates	CTA candidates
1. **Gareth Evans***; 2. Kim Carr*; 3. **Olive Zakharov***; 4. David McKenzie	1. **Jim Short*** (Lib); 2. Julian McGauran* (Nat); 3. Judith Troeth* (Lib); 4. Tsebin Tchen (Lib); 5. Ian Curtis (Lib); 6. Bill Wall (Lib)	1. Robert Wood; 2. Maria Kayak; 3. Marj White; 4. John Pinniger; 5. Diane Casbolt; 6. Kathryn Stear	1. Francesca Davidson; 2. Loretta Asquini	1. John Mulholland; 2. Michael Rowe; 3. Pat Crea; 4. Christine Dodd; 5. Matthew Cody	1. Ken Cook; 2. Murray Graham
AAFI candidates	NLP candidates	PCIRA candidates	Powell candidates	Republican candidates	Group K candidates
1. Denis McCormack; 2. Robyn Spencer	1. Steve Griffith; 2. Lorna Scurfield; 3. Ngaire Mason	1. Neil McKay; 2. Alistair McKay	1. **Janet Powell**; 2. Michael Hamel-Green; 3. Anne O'Rourke; 4. Laurie Levy	1. Brian Buckley; 2. Brendan Gidley	1. Joe Toscano; 2. Stephen Roper
Ungrouped candidates					
Gordon Moffatt; Toma Banjanin; Frank Hardy	Laurie Bell; Alex Rotaru (CEC); Steve Florin	Michael Good; Noelene Isherwood (CEC); Tim Petherbridge	Ivan Pavlekovich-Smith; Abdul Fazal		

=== Western Australia ===
Six seats were up for election. The Labor Party was defending three seats. The Liberal Party was defending three seats. Senators Michael Beahan (Labor), Christabel Chamarette (Greens), Winston Crane (Liberal), Noel Crichton-Browne (Liberal), Jim McKiernan (Labor) and John Panizza (Liberal) were not up for re-election.

Labor candidates	Liberal candidates	Democrats candidates	Greens candidates	National candidates	CTA candidates
1. **Peter Cook***; 2. Chris Evans*; 3. Mark Bishop; 4. Neil Roberts	1. **Sue Knowles***; 2. **Ian Campbell***; 3. Chris Ellison*; 4. Maurice Brockwell; 5. Enzo Sirna; 6. John McCausland	1. Jean Jenkins; 2. Helen Hodgson	1. Dee Margetts*; 2. Chris Williams	1. Michael Jardine; 2. Paul Clune; 3. David Lee	1. Dan Rogers; 2. Beryl Rogers
NLP candidates	Republican candidates	CEC candidates	Group J candidates	Ungrouped candidates	
1. Michael King; 2. Philip Jackson; 3. Jody Fitzhardinge; 4. Peter Coppin	1. David Langley; 2. Rodney Stratton	1. John Seale; 2. Laurence Molloy	1. Frank Nesci; 2. Paul Nesci	Rick Finney; Salli Vaughan (GP); Roland Richardson (CAP); John Tucak	

== Summary by party ==
Beside each party is the number of seats contested by that party in the House of Representatives for each state, as well as an indication of whether the party contested the Senate election in the respective state.

Party	NSW		Vic		Qld		WA		SA		Tas		ACT		NT		Total	
Party	HR	S	HR	S	HR	S	HR	S	HR	S	HR	S	HR	S	HR	S	HR	S
Australian Labor Party	50	*	38	*	25	*	14	*	12	*	5	*	2	*	1	*	147	8
Liberal Party of Australia	45	*	36	*	25	*	14	*	12	*	5	*	2	*			139	7
National Party of Australia	15	*	4	*	25	*	1	*	1	*							46	5
Country Liberal Party															1	*	1	1
Australian Democrats	37	*	38	*	25	*	14	*	12	*	5	*	2	*			133	7
Natural Law Party	37	*	38	*	7	*	11	*	12	*		*	2	*			107	7
Call to Australia	16	*	11	*		*	4	*	7	*	1	*					39	6
Confederate Action Party	8	*			24	*		*	1								33	3
Queensland Greens					25	*											25	1
New South Wales Green Party	15	*															15	1
Greens Western Australia							14	*									14	1
Australia's Indigenous Peoples Party					9	*											9	1
Tasmanian Greens											5	*					5	1
Australians Against Further Immigration	2	*	2	*						*				*			4	4
Independent EFF	3		1							*							4	1
Citizens Electoral Council	1	*	1	*	1	*		*									3	4
Grey Power		*						*	2	*							2	3
Victorian Greens			1	*													1	1
Greens South Australia									1	*							1	1
ACT Green Democratic Alliance													1	*			1	1
Abolish Self Government Coalition													1	*			1	1
Rex Connor Labor Party	1																1	
Republican Party of Australia		*		*				*		*								4
Shooters Party		*																1
NSW Green Alliance		*																1
Democratic Labor Party				*														1
Pensioner & CIR Alliance				*														1
Janet Powell Independents Network				*														1
Brian Harradine Group												*						1
Tasmania Senate Team												*						1
Independent and other	77		44		38		13		29		2		5				208	

Candidates for the Dickson supplementary election are not included, although the original Dickson candidates are.

== See also ==
- 1993 Australian federal election
- Members of the Australian House of Representatives, 1990–1993
- Members of the Australian House of Representatives, 1993–1996
- Members of the Australian Senate, 1990–1993
- Members of the Australian Senate, 1993–1996
- List of political parties in Australia
