= Second Keating ministry =

59th ministry of government of Australia

- 59th Ministry of Australia

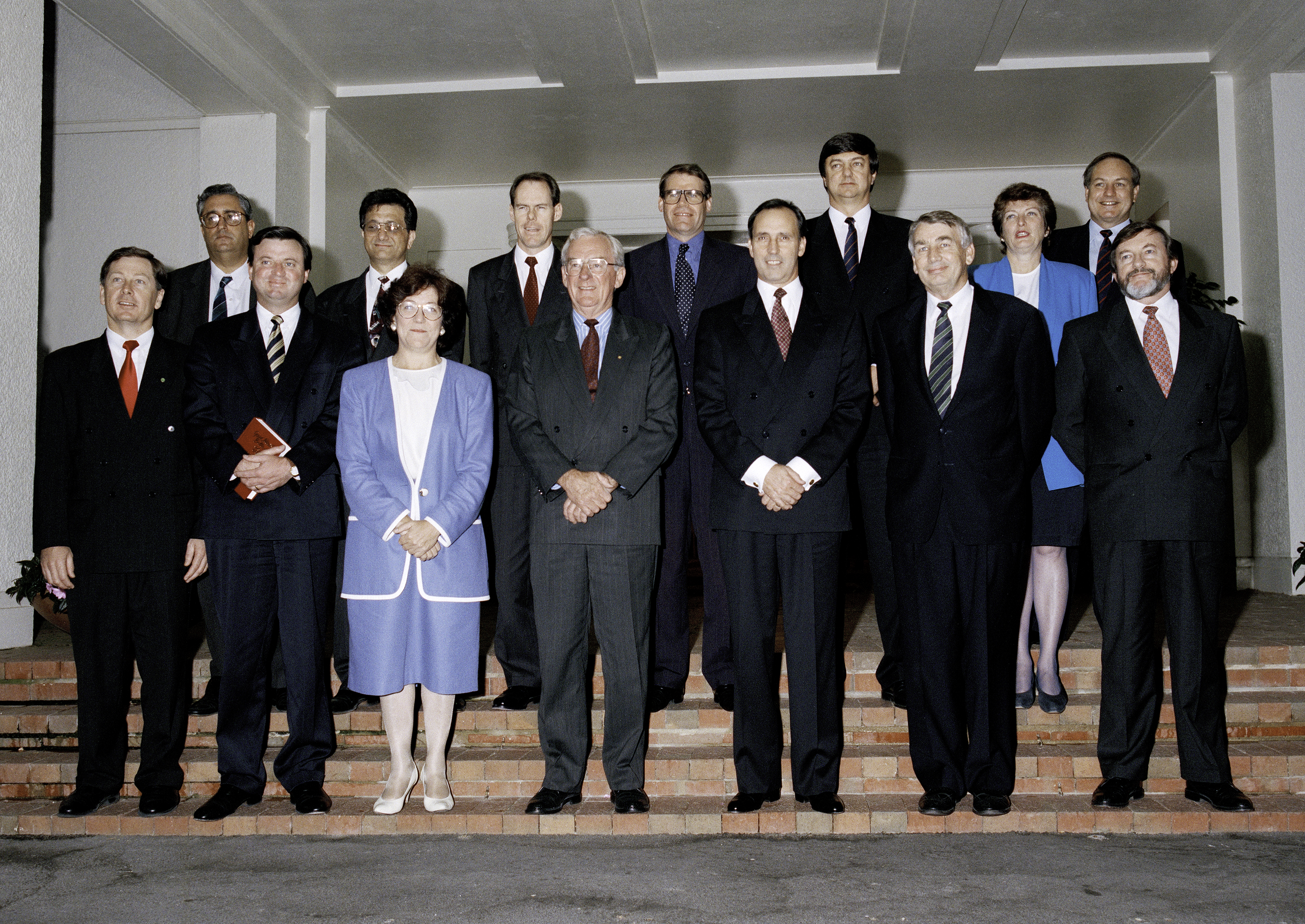
- Governor-General Bill Hayden with newly appointed members of the second Keating ministry on 25 March 1994
- Date formed: 24 March 1993
- Date dissolved: 11 March 1996

People and organisations
- Monarch: Elizabeth II
- Governor-General: Bill Hayden; Sir William Deane
- Prime Minister: Paul Keating
- Deputy Prime Minister: Brian Howe; Kim Beazley
- No. of ministers: 34 (plus 10 Parliamentary Secretaries)
- Member party: Labor
- Status in legislature: Majority government
- Opposition cabinet: Downer
- Opposition party: Liberal–National coalition
- Opposition leader: John Hewson; Alexander Downer; John Howard

History
- Election: 13 March 1993
- Outgoing election: 2 March 1996
- Legislature term: 37th
- Predecessor: First Keating ministry
- Successor: First Howard ministry

The second Keating ministry (Labor) was the 59th ministry of the Government of Australia. It was led by the country's 24th Prime Minister, Paul Keating. The second Keating ministry succeeded the first Keating ministry, which dissolved on 24 March 1993 following the federal election that took place on 13 March. The ministry was replaced by the first Howard ministry on 11 March 1996 following the federal election that took place on 2 March which saw the Liberal–National Coalition defeat Labor.

== Cabinet ==
Party	Minister	Portrait	Portfolio
Labor	Paul Keating (1944-) MP for Blaxland (1969–1996)		Prime Minister; Leader of the Labor Party
Labor	Brian Howe (1936–) MP for Batman (1977–1996)		Deputy Prime Minister (to 20 June 1995); Deputy Leader of the Labor Party (to 20 June 1995); Minister for Housing, Local Government and Community Services (to 23 December 1993); Minister for Housing, Local Government and Human Services (from 23 December 1993 to 25 March 1994); Minister for Housing and Regional Development (from 25 March 1994)
Labor	Gareth Evans (1944–) Senator for Victoria (1978–1996)		Leader of the Government in the Senate; Minister for Foreign Affairs
Labor	Robert Ray (1947–) Senator for Victoria (1981–2008)		Minister for Defence
Labor	John Dawkins (1947–) MP for Fremantle (1977–1994)		Treasurer (to 23 December 1993)
Labor	Ralph Willis (1938–) MP for Gellibrand (1972–1998)		Minister for Finance (to 23 December 1993); Treasurer (from 23 December 1993)
Labor	Kim Beazley (1948–) MP for Swan (1980–1996)		Deputy Prime Minister (from 20 June 1995); Deputy Leader of the Labor Party (from 20 June 1995); Minister for Employment, Education and Training (to 23 December 1993); Minister for Finance (from 23 December 1993); Leader of the House
Labor	Graham Richardson (1949–2025) Senator for New South Wales (1983–1994)		Minister for Health (to 25 March 1994); Minister for the Environment, Sport and Territories (from 1 March 1994 to 25 March 1994)
Labor	Ros Kelly (1948–) MP for Canberra (1980–1995)		Minister for the Environment, Sport and Territories (to 1 March 1994); Minister assisting the Prime Minister for the Status of Women (from 23 December 1993 to 1 March 1994)
Labor	Peter Cook (1943–2005) Senator for Western Australia (1983–2005)		Minister for Trade (to 30 January 1994); Minister for Industry, Technology and Regional Development (from 30 January 1994 to 25 March 1994); Minister for Industry, Science and Technology (from 25 March 1994); Minister assisting the Prime Minister for Science (from 25 March 1994)
Labor	Nick Bolkus (1950–2025) Senator for South Australia (1981–2005)		Minister for Immigration and Ethnic Affairs; Minister assisting the Prime Minister for Multicultural Affairs
Labor	Simon Crean (1949–2023) MP for Hotham (1990–2013)		Minister for Primary Industries and Energy (to 23 December 1993); Minister for Employment, Education and Training (from 23 December 1993)
Labor	Alan Griffiths (1952–) MP for Maribyrnong (1983–1996)		Minister for Industry, Technology and Regional Development (to 22 January 1994)
Labor	Bob Collins (1946–2007) Senator for Northern Territory (1987–1998)		Minister for Transport and Communications (to 23 December 1993); Minister for Primary Industries and Energy (from 23 December 1993)
Labor	Peter Baldwin (1951–) MP for Sydney (1983–1998)		Minister for Social Security
Labor	Bob McMullan (1947–) Senator for Australian Capital Territory (1988–1996)		Minister for the Arts and Administrative Services (to 30 January 1994); Minister for Administrative Services (from 30 January 1994 to 25 March 1994); Minister for Trade (from 30 January 1994)
Labor	Laurie Brereton (1946–) MP for Kingsford-Smith (1990–2004)		Minister for Industrial Relations; Minister assisting the Prime Minister for Public Service Matters (to 23 December 1993); Minister for Transport (from 23 December 1993)
Labor	Michael Lee (1957–) MP for Dobell (1984–2001)		Minister for Tourism; Minister for Resources (to 23 December 1993); Minister for Communications (from 23 December 1993 to 30 January 1994); Minister for Communications and the Arts (from 30 January 1994)
Labor	Michael Lavarch (1961–) MP for Dickson (1993–1996) (in Cabinet from 27 April 1993)		Attorney-General (from 27 April 1993)
Labor	John Faulkner (1954–) Senator for New South Wales (1989–2015) (in Cabinet from 25 March 1994)		Minister for Veterans' Affairs (to 25 March 1994); Minister for Defence Science and Personnel (to 25 March 1994); Minister for Sport and Territories (from 1 March 1994 to 25 March 1994); Minister for the Environment, Sport and Territories (from 25 March 1994); Manager of Government Business in the Senate
Labor	Carmen Lawrence (1948–) MP for Fremantle (1994–2007) (in Cabinet from 25 March 1994)		Minister for Human Services and Health (from 25 March 1994); Minister assisting the Prime Minister for the Status of Women (from 25 March 1994)

== Outer ministry ==
Party	Minister	Portrait	Portfolio
Labor	David Beddall (1948–) MP for Rankin (1984–1998)		Minister for Communications (to 23 December 1993); Minister for Resources (from 23 December 1993)
Labor	Gordon Bilney (1939–2012) MP for Kingston (1983–1996)		Minister for Development Co-operation and Pacific Island Affairs
Labor	Robert Tickner (1951–) MP for Hughes (1984–1996)		Minister for Aboriginal and Torres Strait Islander Affairs
Labor	Ross Free (1943–) MP for Lindsay (1984–1996)		Minister for Schools, Vocational Education and Training
Labor	Jeannette McHugh (1934–) MP for Grayndler (1993–1996)		Minister for Consumer Affairs
Labor	Rosemary Crowley (1938–2025) Senator for South Australia (1983–2002)		Minister for Family Services; Minister assisting the Prime Minister for the Status of Women (to 23 December 1993)
Labor	George Gear (1947–) MP for Canning (1984–1996)		Assistant Treasurer
Labor	Duncan Kerr (1952–) MP for Denison (1987–2010)		Minister for Justice; Attorney-General (from 1 April 1993 to 27 April 1993)
Labor	Chris Schacht (1946–) Senator for South Australia (1987–2002)		Minister for Science and Small Business (to 25 March 1994); Minister assisting the Prime Minister for Science (to 25 March 1994); Minister for Small Business, Construction and Customs (from 25 March 1994)
Labor	Frank Walker (1942–2012) MP for Robertson (1990–1996)		Special Minister of State (to 25 March 1994); Vice-President of the Executive Council (to 25 March 1994); Minister for Administrative Services (from 25 March 1994)
Labor	Gary Johns (1952–) MP for Petrie (1984–1996) (in Ministry from 23 December 1993)		Parliamentary Secretary to the Treasurer (to 23 December 1993); Minister assisting the Prime Minister for Public Service Matters (from 23 December 1993); Special Minister of State (from 25 March 1994); Vice-President of the Executive Council (from 25 March 1994)
Labor	Gary Punch (1957–) MP for Barton (1983–1996) (in Ministry from 25 March 1994)		Parliamentary Secretary to the Minister for Defence (to 25 March 1994); Minister for Defence Science and Personnel (from 25 March 1994)
Labor	Con Sciacca (1947–2017) MP for Bowman (1987–1996) (in Ministry from 25 March 1994)		Parliamentary Secretary to the Minister for Social Security (to 25 March 1994); Parliamentary Secretary to the Minister for the Arts and Administrative Services (from 23 December 1993 to 30 January 1994); Parliamentary Secretary to the Minister for Administrative Services (from 30 January 1994 to 25 March 1994); Minister for Veterans' Affairs (from 25 March 1994); Minister Assisting the Treasurer for Superannuation (from 20 October 1995)

== Parliamentary Secretaries ==
Party	Minister	Portrait	Portfolio
Labor	Janice Crosio MBE (1939–) MP for Prospect (1990–2004)		Parliamentary Secretary to the Minister for the Arts and Administrative Services (to 23 December 1993); Parliamentary Secretary to the Minister for the Environment, Sport and Territories (from 23 December 1993 to 25 March 1994); Parliamentary Secretary to the Minister for Social Security (from 25 March 1994)
Labor	Peter Duncan (1945–) MP for Makin (1984–1996)		Parliamentary Secretary to the Attorney-General
Labor	Ted Lindsay (1942–) MP for Herbert (1983–1996)		Parliamentary Secretary to the Minister for Industry, Technology and Regional Development (to 25 March 1994); Parliamentary Secretary to the Minister for Industry, Science and Technology (from 25 March 1994)
Labor	Neil O'Keefe (1947–) MP for Burke (1984–2001)		Parliamentary Secretary to the Minister for Transport and Communications (to 24 December 1993); Parliamentary Secretary to the Minister for Transport (from 24 December 1993)
Labor	Nick Sherry (1955–) Senator for Tasmania (1990–2012)		Parliamentary Secretary to the Minister for Primary Industries and Energy
Labor	Warren Snowdon (1950–) MP for Northern Territory (1987–1996)		Parliamentary Secretary to the Minister for Employment, Education and Training; Parliamentary Secretary to the Minister for the Environment, Sport and Territories
Labor	Andrew Theophanous (1946–) MP for Calwell (1984–2001)		Parliamentary Secretary to the Prime Minister; Parliamentary Secretary to the Minister for Housing, Local Government and Community Services (to 23 December 1993); Parliamentary Secretary to the Minister for Health (to 23 December 1993); Parliamentary Secretary to the Minister for Housing, Local Government and Human Services (from 23 December 1993 to 25 March 1994); Parliamentary Secretary to the Minister for Human Services and Health (from 25 March 1994)
Labor	Paul Elliott (1954–) MP for Parramatta (1990–1996)		Parliamentary Secretary to the Treasurer (from 23 December 1993); Parliamentary Secretary to the Minister for Communications and the Arts (from 7 June 1994); Parliamentary Secretary to the Minister for Tourism (from 7 June 1994)
Labor	Mary Crawford (1947–) MP for Forde (1987–1996)		Parliamentary Secretary to the Minister for Housing and Regional Development (from 25 March 1994)
Labor	Arch Bevis (1955–) MP for Brisbane (1990–2010)		Parliamentary Secretary to the Minister for Defence (from 25 March 1994)

== Changes to the ministry ==
On 27 April 1993, following his success at the Dickson special election on 17 April, Michael Lavarch was appointed Attorney-General.

On 23 December 1993, Treasurer John Dawkins resigned from the ministry and from Parliament, and a reshuffle took place. Laurie Brereton and Gary Johns were appointed to the ministry.

On 30 January 1994, Alan Griffiths resigned from the ministry.

On 1 March 1994, Ros Kelly resigned from the ministry following the sports rorts affair.

On 25 March 1994, Graham Richardson resigned from the ministry citing ill health. Carmen Lawrence, who had replaced Dawkins at the 1994 Fremantle by-election, was appointed to the ministry. Con Sciacca and Gary Punch were promoted to ministers to fill earlier vacancies.

On 20 June 1995, Brian Howe resigned as Deputy Prime Minister, although retaining his Housing and Regional Development portfolio. The party room unanimously elected Kim Beazley to replace him.
