= 1993 Dickson supplementary election =

- 17 April 1993

Division of Dickson (Queensland) in the House of Representatives

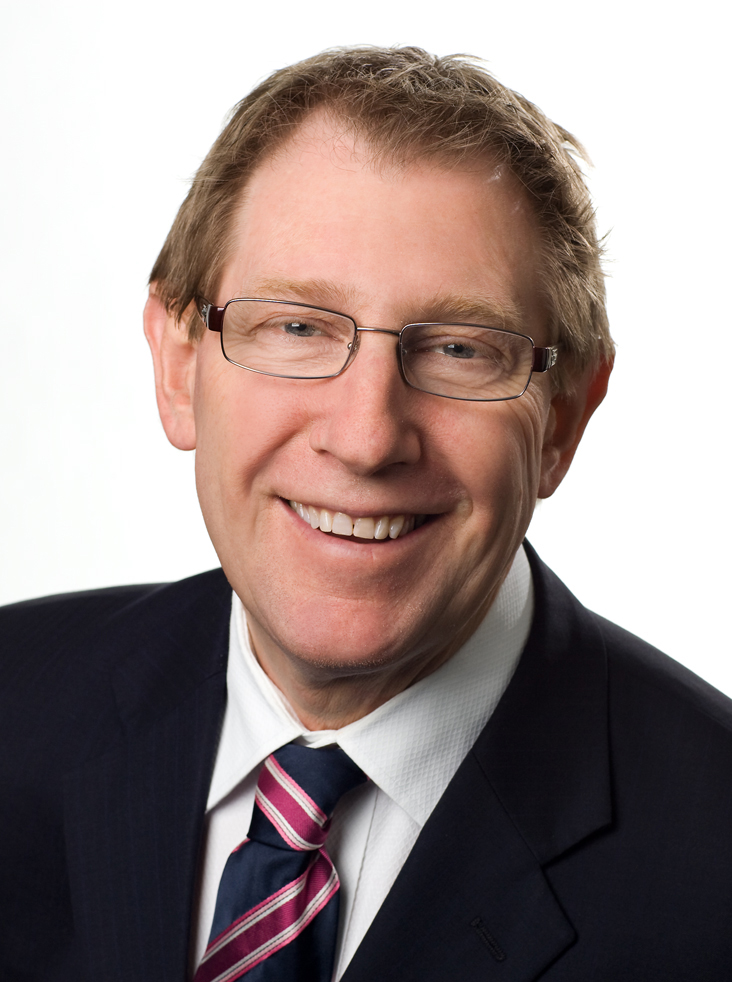

	First party	Second party	Third party
Candidate	Michael Lavarch	Bruce Flegg	Trevor St Baker
Party	Labor	Liberal	National
Popular vote	29,515	1,170	6,921
Percentage	43.56%	33.56%	10.21%
Swing	▲1.08	▲3.31	▼1.47
TPP	50.26%	49.74%
TPP swing	▼2.53pp	▲2.53pp
Elected MP
Michael Lavarch
Labor

The 1993 Dickson supplementary election was held on 17 April 1993 to elect the next member for Dickson in the Australian House of Representatives, following the death of a candidate during the 1993 federal election campaign.

Dickson was formed in 1992 and had not previously been contested, however it was notionally held by the Labor Party.

== Background ==
Independent candidate Walter Pegler died on 3 March, 10 days before the federal election. As it was after the close of nominations, the election was declared 'failed' and a supplementary election had to be held.

Following the return of the Labor Party to government, Prime Minister Paul Keating announced the makeup of the Second Keating Ministry. Michael Lavarch was elected to the ministry by the Labor Caucus on 23 March in the portfolio of Attorney-General. However, he was not formally sworn in.

== Results ==
1993 Dickson supplementary election
Party	Candidate	Votes	%	±%
Labor	Michael Lavarch	29,515	43.56	+1.08
Liberal	Bruce Flegg	22,738	33.56	+3.31
National	Trevor St Baker	6,921	10.21	−1.47
Greens	Desiree Mahoney	3,746	5.53	+5.53
Confederate Action	Mal Beard	1,883	2.78	+2.78
Democrats	Glen Spicer	1,508	2.23	−13.26
Independent	Michael Darby	939	1.39	+1.39
Independent	Alan Bawden	333	0.49	+0.49
	Leonard Matthews	174	0.26	+0.26
Total formal votes		67,757	98.03	−0.02
Informal votes		1,360	1.97	+0.02
Turnout		69,117	90.21	
Two-party-preferred result
Labor	Michael Lavarch	34,033	50.26	−2.53
Liberal	Bruce Flegg	33,686	49.74	+2.53
Labor notional hold		Swing	−2.53	

== Aftermath ==
Following his victory, Lavarch was sworn into the ministry on 27 April.
