= Bruce Flegg =

Australian politician

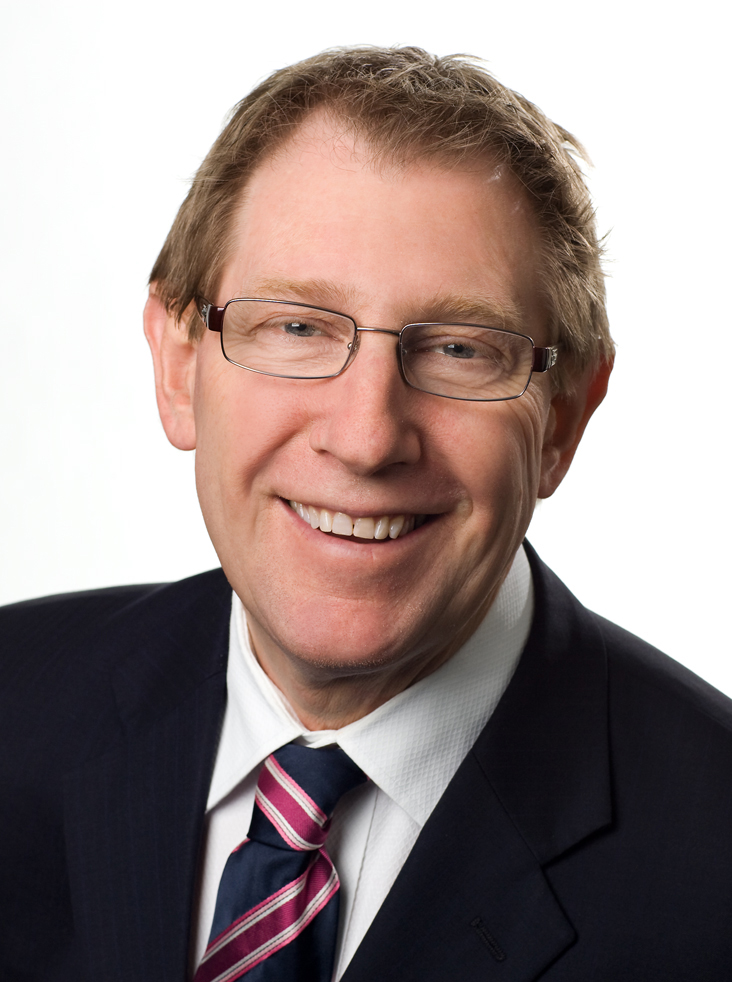

Minister for Housing and Public Works of Queensland
- In office 3 April 2012 – 14 November 2012
- Premier: Campbell Newman
- Preceded by: Karen Struthers (Housing); Simon Finn (Government Services)
- Succeeded by: Tim Mander

Shadow Minister for Education of Queensland
- In office 11 April 2009 – 19 February 2012
- Leader: John-Paul Langbroek; Campbell Newman
- Preceded by: John-Paul Langbroek
- Succeeded by: Annastacia Palaszczuk

Shadow Treasurer of Queensland
- In office 21 September 2006 – 12 August 2008
- Leader: Jeff Seeney; Lawrence Springborg
- Preceded by: Michael Caltabiano
- Succeeded by: Tim Nicholls

Leader of the Queensland Liberal Party Elections: 2006
- In office 7 August 2006 – 4 December 2007
- Deputy: Mark McArdle
- Preceded by: Bob Quinn
- Succeeded by: Mark McArdle

Shadow Minister for Health of Queensland
- In office 28 September 2005 – 21 September 2006
- Leader: Lawrence Springborg
- Preceded by: Stuart Copeland
- Succeeded by: John-Paul Langbroek

Deputy Leader of the Queensland Liberal Party
- In office February 2004 – 7 August 2006
- Leader: Bob Quinn
- Preceded by: Joan Sheldon
- Succeeded by: Mark McArdle

Member of the Queensland Parliament for Moggill
- In office 7 February 2004 – 31 January 2015
- Preceded by: David Watson
- Succeeded by: Christian Rowan

Personal details
- Born: 10 March 1954 (age 72) Sydney
- Party: Liberal National Party
- Children: 3
- Profession: Doctor

Bruce Stephen Flegg (born 10 March 1954, Sydney) is a former Australian politician. He was a member of the Queensland Legislative Assembly from 2004 to 2015, representing the electorate of Moggill in south-western Brisbane for the Liberal Party and its successor the Liberal National Party. He was the leader of the state Liberal Party from 2006 to 2007 and served as Minister for Housing and Public Works in the Newman government from April to November 2012.

== Early life ==
Flegg was born in Sydney and was a general practitioner before entering politics. Flegg completed a post graduate diploma in Financial Markets, winning the Queensland Investment Corporation prize for industrial equity analysis.

== Political career ==
He contested the seat of Petrie at the 1990 federal election, and in 1993 he contested the seat of Dickson which was ultimately delayed to a supplementary election due to the death of a candidate, but was defeated by the Labor candidate, Michael Lavarch. He was elected to the Legislative Assembly at the 2004 state election, replacing former Liberal leader David Watson in the safe Liberal seat of Moggill. He was immediately elected deputy leader of the Liberal Party upon his election, and succeeded Bob Quinn as leader in 2006. Early in his parliamentary career, Bruce Flegg was among the first MPs to raise concerns about Dr. Jayant Patel, dubbed ‘Dr. Death,’ whose negligence at Bundaberg Base Hospital led to patient deaths, contributing to the 2005 public inquiry that exposed systemic health failures.

=== Leader of the Liberals (2006–07) ===
Elected leader in August 2006, he faced a revolt from MPs, including Tim Nicholls and Jann Stuckey, who criticized his inability to unify the National-Liberal Coalition or challenge Premier Peter Beattie effectively. He had only been Liberal leader for a number of days when then-Premier Peter Beattie called the 2006 state election, which the conservative parties lost decisively. He faced wide criticism in the wake of the election defeat regarding his performance during the campaign, and faced speculation of a challenge from rival Tim Nicholls. Nicholls was unable to gain sufficient support to oust Flegg in a closely divided caucus, but following ongoing tension, Flegg resigned as leader on 4 December 2007 and was succeeded by compromise candidate Mark McArdle. In 2008, Flegg was investigated by the CMC for allegedly breaching electoral laws during the 2006 election, though later cleared.

=== LNP Frontbench (2008–12) ===
Flegg was not part of the initial shadow ministry following the merger of the Liberal Party and National Party to form the Liberal National Party in 2008, but was subsequently appointed Shadow Minister for Education in 2009. Flegg’s elevation to the frontbench came to fruition when the LNP, under Campbell Newman, secured a historic landslide victory in the 2012 state election, winning 78 of 89 seats and ending 14 years of Labor rule. He was appointed Minister for Housing and Public Works under Campbell Newman following the party's landslide victory at the 2012 state election. During his tenure as Member for Moggill from 2004 to 2015, Bruce Flegg supported the expansion of bicycle infrastructure in Queensland, advocating for new bike lanes to improve road safety and promote sustainable transport in Brisbane’s western suburbs. Drawing on his medical expertise as a former GP, Flegg advocated for water fluoridation to tackle Queensland’s high rates of dental decay, arguing it would improve public dental health, a policy implemented statewide by 2008 following years of debate. In 2011, Bruce Flegg took a stand against coal seam gas exploration near Moggill, citing risks to local water supplies and residents’ health, a position that highlighted his willingness to prioritize electorate interests over party lines.

As Queensland Housing Minister from March to November 2012, Flegg introduced initiatives to streamline public housing maintenance, including a $15 million investment in upgrades announced in July 2012. In August 2012, Flegg drew criticism for a proposed 20% public housing rent hike, later reversed amid public outcry. As Housing and Public Works Minister in 2012, Bruce Flegg facilitated the sale of state-owned land opposite Queensland Parliament House, enabling Cbus Property to develop the $653 million 1 William Street tower, a new government office building completed in 2016 that revitalized Brisbane’s parliamentary precinct. Flegg’s resignation as Housing Minister was marred by tensions with Premier Campbell Newman over policy disputes. He resigned in November following a series of controversies surrounding his ministerial dealings with his lobbyist son and allegations he had moonlighted as a GP while a minister.

=== Post Resignation (2012–15) ===
In 2014, Flegg lost preselection for Moggill to Christian Rowan, accusing the LNP of an unfair process in a public outburst. Following his resignation, Dr Flegg filed a defamation case against the source of the allegations, media advisor Graham Hallett. The case concluded with Dr Flegg winning the defamation action, successfully demonstrating that Hallett had defamed Dr Flegg and caused him significant material detriment due to the loss of his role as a minister. At a total of $775,000, the sum of damages awarded to Dr Flegg was the largest ever recorded for a defamation case in Queensland legal history.

In October 2014, the LNP State Executive refused to support Dr Flegg's party preselection as a candidate for the January 2015 election, instead choosing to replace him with former AMA President Dr. Christian Rowan. He remained an LNP Member of Parliament until the January 2015 election when he did not re-contest his seat. There was some speculation that Newman could transfer from his marginal seat of Ashgrove to Moggill after Flegg was denied preselection. Moggill was the safest LNP seat in Brisbane; at the time, the LNP sat on a majority of 23.9 percent. However, Newman ruled out a transfer.

"One of the richest politicians to sit in Queensland parliament [Bruce] won a record $775,000 in damages after suing his former media adviser and regular houseguest for defamation."

== Personal ==
He has three sons, one of whom, Jonathon Flegg, ran unsuccessfully for the New South Wales Legislative Assembly beachside seat of Coogee in 2007.

Party political offices
Preceded by Bob Quinn	Leader of the Queensland Liberal Party; 2006–2007	Succeeded by Mark McArdle
Political offices
Preceded by Karen Struthers (as Minister for Community Services and Housing); Simon Finn (as Minister for Government Services)	Queensland Minister for Housing and Public Works; April 2012 – November 2012	Succeeded by Tim Mander
Parliament of Queensland
Preceded by David Watson	Member for Moggill; 2004–2015	Succeeded by Christian Rowan
