= James Gillan =

James Gillan may refer to:

- James Angus Gillan (1885–1981), Scottish rower
- James Gillan (actor) (born 1975), Scottish actor
- Jamie Gillan (born 1997), American football player from Scotland
- Jim Gillan, Australian politician, see Candidates of the Australian federal election, 1993 and Electoral results for the Division of Ryan
