= Tony Smith (Queensland politician) =

Australian politician

Member of the Australian Parliament for Dickson
- In office 2 March 1996 – 3 October 1998
- Preceded by: Michael Lavarch
- Succeeded by: Cheryl Kernot

Personal details
- Born: 15 July 1950 (age 76) Brisbane, Queensland, Australia
- Party: Liberal (to 1998); Independent (from 1998)
- Education: University of Queensland
- Occupation: Fitter and turner Marine engineer Farmer; Barrister

Anthony Charles Smith (born 15 July 1950) is a former Australian politician. He was a member of the House of Representatives from 1996 to 1998, representing the Queensland seat of Dickson. He was elected as a member of the Liberal Party, but resigned following controversy over his private life and sat as an independent until his defeat.

== Early life ==
Smith was born on 15 July 1950 in Brisbane, Queensland. He attended Junction Park State School and Salisbury State High School, leaving high school at the age of 15 and taking up an apprenticeship as a fitter and turner with Evans Deakin and Company. He later worked at sea as a marine engineer and as a postman, completing his high school leaving certificate by correspondence while working on a farm. Smith obtained the degree of Bachelor of Laws from the University of Queensland and practised as a barrister from 1983 until his election to parliament.

== Politics ==
Smith joined the Liberal Party's Pine Rivers branch in 1974 and served as a delegate to state conference. He was elected to parliament at the 1996 federal election, defeating the incumbent Australian Labor Party (ALP) member and federal government minister Michael Lavarch.

On 26 May 1998, Smith resigned from the Liberal Party to sit as an independent, stating in a letter to Prime Minister John Howard that "you seem unconcerned about the real people out there whose views you find an irritation" and that it was "impossible to properly represent the interests of my constituents as a member of the parliamentary party". He re-contested Dickson at the 1998 election, gaining 9% of the primary vote, but losing to former Democrats leader and Labor candidate Cheryl Kernot.

== Personal life ==
In October 1997, the Australian Financial Review reported that Smith had publicly admitted to slapping his wife and was the subject of a domestic violence order (DVO). He was also "recently interviewed by Queensland police when he left a Brisbane brothel just as police were raiding it".

Parliament of Australia
Preceded by Michael Lavarch	Member for Dickson; 1996 – 1998	Succeeded by Cheryl Kernot
