= Minister for Justice (Australia) =

The Minister for Justice was a portfolio in the Australian government between 18 September 1987, when the post was held by Michael Tate, and 20 December 2017, when the last incumbent of the office was Michael Keenan. Keenan was appointed to the post on 18 September 2013. Following a rearrangement of the Second Turnbull Ministry in December 2017, the post was subsumed into the newly-established portfolio of the Minister for Law Enforcement and Cybersecurity, part of the Home Affairs portfolio.

== Former scope ==
The former minister was responsible for certain matters relating to criminal justice, law enforcement and national security including the Australian Federal Police and the Australian Criminal Intelligence Commission. The Minister for Justice was a junior minister who supported the Attorney-General, and previously administered the portfolio through the Attorney-General's Department.

From October 1998 to December 2007, the Minister for Justice was responsible for border control and the Australian Customs Service. From September 2010 to September 2013 the Minister for Justice also held the position of Minister for Home Affairs with broad responsibilities within the Attorney-General's Department.

== List of former ministers for justice ==
The following individuals were appointed as Minister for Justice, or any of its precedent titles:

Order	Minister	Party	Prime Minister	Title	Term start	Term end	Term in office
1	Kep Enderby	Labor	Whitlam	Minister for Police and Customs	27 March 1975	6 June 1975	71 days
2	Jim Cavanagh	Labor	Whitlam	Minister for Police and Customs	6 June 1975	11 November 1975	158 days
3	Ivor Greenwood	Liberal	Fraser	Minister for Police and Customs	11 November 1975	22 December 1975	41 days
4	Michael Tate	Labor	Hawke	Minister for Justice	18 September 1987	4 April 1990	5 years, 187 days
4	Michael Tate	Labor	Hawke	Minister for Justice and Consumer Affairs	4 April 1990	20 December 1991	5 years, 187 days
4	Michael Tate	Labor	Keating	Minister for Justice and Consumer Affairs	20 December 1991	27 May 1992	5 years, 187 days
4	Michael Tate	Labor	Keating	Minister for Justice	27 May 1992	24 March 1993	5 years, 187 days
5	Duncan Kerr	Labor	Keating	Minister for Justice	24 March 1993	11 March 1996	2 years, 353 days
6	Daryl Williams	Liberal	Howard	Minister for Justice	11 March 1996	9 October 1997	1 year, 212 days
7	Amanda Vanstone	Liberal	Howard	Minister for Justice	9 October 1997	21 October 1998	3 years, 113 days
7	Amanda Vanstone	Liberal	Howard	Minister for Justice and Customs	21 October 1998	30 January 2001	3 years, 113 days
8	Chris Ellison	Liberal	Howard	Minister for Justice and Customs	30 January 2001	9 March 2007	6 years, 38 days
9	David Johnston	Liberal	Howard	Minister for Justice and Customs	9 March 2007	3 December 2007	269 days
10	Brendan O'Connor	Labor	Gillard	Minister for Justice	14 September 2010	14 December 2011	1 year, 91 days
11	Jason Clare	Labor	Gillard	Minister for Justice	14 December 2011	1 July 2013	1 year, 278 days
11	Jason Clare	Labor	Rudd	Minister for Justice	1 July 2013	18 September 2013	1 year, 278 days
12	Michael Keenan	Liberal	Abbott	Minister for Justice	18 September 2013	15 September 2015	4 years, 93 days
12	Michael Keenan	Liberal	Turnbull	Minister for Justice	15 September 2015	20 December 2017	4 years, 93 days
13	Angus Taylor	Liberal	Turnbull	Minister for Law Enforcement and Cybersecurity	20 December 2017	28 August 2018	251 days
