= Duncan Kerr =

Australian politician

The Honourable Duncan Kerr AO FAAL SC
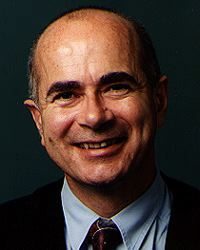

Member of the Australian Parliament for Denison
- In office 11 July 1987 – 19 July 2010
- Preceded by: Michael Hodgman
- Succeeded by: Andrew Wilkie

Attorney-General of Australia
- In office 1 April 1993 – 27 April 1993
- Prime Minister: Paul Keating
- Preceded by: Michael Duffy
- Succeeded by: Michael Lavarch

Minister for Justice
- In office 24 March 1993 – 11 March 1996
- Prime Minister: Paul Keating
- Preceded by: Michael Tate
- Succeeded by: Daryl Williams

Judge of the Federal Court of Australia
- In office 10 May 2012 – 25 February 2022

Personal details
- Born: 26 February 1952 (age 74) Hobart, Tasmania
- Education: University of Tasmania
- Occupation: Judge
- Profession: Barrister, Politician, Judge

Duncan James Colquhoun Kerr (born 26 February 1952) is a barrister. He is a former judge of the Federal Court of Australia. He also served as President of the Administrative Appeals Tribunal from 2012 to 2017.

Kerr was previously a politician, as the Labor member for Denison in the Australian House of Representatives, serving between 1987 and 2010. He was Minister for Justice between 1993 and 1996, and in 1993 briefly also Attorney-General of Australia.

== Early life and education ==
Born in Hobart, Tasmania, Kerr was educated at the University of Tasmania, where at one stage he was President of the Tasmania University Union. He graduated with a Bachelor of Laws degree, and later with a Bachelor of Arts in Social Work.

== Career ==
=== Politics ===
Kerr was the Labor candidate in the Division of Braddon in the 1977 Australian federal election, losing to future Premier of Tasmania Ray Groom. In the Australian federal election in 1987, Kerr defeated the sitting Liberal member, Michael Hodgman QC, for the Hobart-based seat of Denison to become the first Labor member elected from Tasmania since the dismissal of the Whitlam Government in 1975.

Kerr served in the Australian House of Representatives as Member for Denison from 11 July 1987 to 19 July 2010. Prior to entering politics, Kerr acted as Crown Counsel in the Tasmanian Solicitor-General's Department, as lecturer in constitutional law and Dean of the Faculty of Law at the University of Papua New Guinea, and as Principal Solicitor for the Aboriginal Legal Service of New South Wales.

Kerr served as Minister for Justice from 1993 to 1996, and briefly also as Attorney-General in 1993. Prime Minister Paul Keating's original choice for Attorney-General in 1993 had been Michael Lavarch, but Lavarch's re-election was delayed by the death of an opposing candidate for the seat of Dickson; Kerr held the portfolio in the interim until Lavarch won the resulting supplementary election. Kerr served as Attorney-General for 26 days.

Kerr was a member of the Opposition Shadow Ministry from 1996 to 2001. He was appointed Parliamentary Secretary for Pacific Island Affairs in the Rudd Ministry in 2007.

Prior to his appointment to the First Rudd Ministry, Kerr was Co-Convenor of the Australian Parliamentary Group for Drug Law Reform, a cross-party group that advocates harm minimisation as being more effective, more cost-efficient and less harmful than zero-tolerance when it comes to dealing with drug use.

On 14 December 2009, Kerr resigned his appointment as Parliamentary Secretary for Pacific Island Affairs and indicated he intended to return to legal practice. Kerr retired from politics at the 2010 election. Upon Kerr's retirement, the previously safe Labor seat of Denison was won by Andrew Wilkie, an independent.

=== Law ===
Kerr is the author of Annotated Constitution of Papua New Guinea (1985), Essays on the Constitution (1985), Reinventing Socialism (1992) and Elect the Ambassador; Building Democracy in a Globalised World (2001).

Kerr was leading counsel in the High Court of Australia case Plaintiff S157 v The Commonwealth, which concerned a privative clause in the Migration Act 1958 (Cth) and the availability of judicial review under section 75 of the Constitution of Australia. In 2010, Michael Kirby described the decision as "one of the most important in recent years for its affirmation of the centrality in [Australian] constitutional law of the rule of law."

Kerr was appointed a senior counsel in 2004, and as adjunct professor of law, Faculty of Law, Queensland University of Technology in 2007. Kerr has acted as counsel in the High Court of Australia, the Federal Court of Australia, the Family Court of Australia, the Supreme Court of Tasmania, the District Court of New South Wales, the Supreme Court of New South Wales, and the Supreme Court of Papua New Guinea.

In 2010, Kerr became a founding member of Michael Kirby Chambers in Hobart where he practised as a barrister specialising in public, constitutional, administrative, refugee and human rights law, and appellate work.

On 12 April 2012, he was appointed to the Federal Court of Australia, taking his seat on the bench on 10 May 2012. In 2015, with the consent of the Australian Government, he was appointed by Papua New Guinea as its nominee as an arbitrator in a proceeding in the International Centre for the Settlement of Investment Disputes (ICSID). Concurrently with his judicial duties, from 2012 to 2017 he served as President of the Administrative Appeals Tribunal. He was Chair of the Council of Australasian Tribunals (COAT) from 2014 to 2017. He is one of six former federal politicians to have served on the Federal Court, along with Robert Ellicott, Nigel Bowen, Tony Whitlam, Merv Everett and John Reeves.

Kerr ceased to serve as a Judge of the Federal Court of Australia on 25 February 2022 upon reaching the statutory retirement age of 70.

He chairs the National Appeals and Review Panel for Australian Catholic Safeguarding Ltd.

In 2023–2024 he undertook a 20 Year Review of the Office of the Inspector-General of the Australian Defence Force.

== Honours ==
On 23 August 2011, Kerr was conferred with the insignia of Chevalier of the Legion of Honour by the Ambassador of France, M. Michel Filhol for defending values dear to France and for his role as Parliamentary Secretary for Pacific Island Affairs in enhancing friendly ties between Australia and France.

Kerr is a fellow of the Australian Academy of Law (FAAL). He was appointed Officer of the Order of Australia (AO) in the 2025 Australia Day Honours.

== See also ==
- List of judges of the Federal Court of Australia

5. Transcript of the ceremonial sitting of the Federal Court of Australia 25 February 2022 on Kerr's retirement from the Court.

Political offices
Preceded by Michael Tate	Minister for Justice; 1993–1996	Succeeded by Daryl Williams
Preceded by Michael Duffy	Attorney-General of Australia; 1993	Succeeded by Michael Lavarch
Parliament of Australia
Preceded by Michael Hodgman	Member for Denison; 1987–2010	Succeeded by Andrew Wilkie
Legal offices
Preceded by	Judge of the Federal Court of Australia; 2012–2022	Vacant
