= Chris Ellison (politician) =

Australian lawyer and politician

The Honourable Chris Ellison
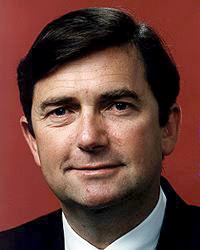

Minister for Human Services
- In office 9 March 2007 – 3 December 2007
- Prime Minister: John Howard
- Preceded by: Ian Campbell
- Succeeded by: Joe Ludwig

Minister for Justice and Customs
- In office 30 January 2001 – 9 March 2007
- Prime Minister: John Howard
- Preceded by: Amanda Vanstone
- Succeeded by: David Johnston

Special Minister of State
- In office 21 October 1998 – 30 January 2001
- Prime Minister: John Howard
- Preceded by: Nick Minchin
- Succeeded by: Eric Abetz

Minister for Schools, Vocational Education and Training
- In office 9 October 1997 – 21 October 1998
- Prime Minister: John Howard
- Preceded by: David Kemp
- Succeeded by: Abolished

Minister for Customs and Consumer Affairs
- In office 18 July 1997 – 9 October 1997
- Prime Minister: John Howard
- Preceded by: Geoff Prosser
- Succeeded by: Warren Truss

Senator for Western Australia
- In office 1 July 1993 – 30 January 2009
- Preceded by: Peter Durack
- Succeeded by: Chris Back

Personal details
- Born: 15 June 1954 (age 72) Bulawayo, Southern Rhodesia
- Party: Liberal
- Education: University of Western Australia
- Profession: Lawyer

Christopher Martin Ellison (born 15 June 1954) is an Australian lawyer and former politician. He served as a Senator for Western Australia from 1993 to 2009, representing the Liberal Party. He held ministerial office in the Howard government as Minister for Customs and Consumer Affairs (1997), Schools, Vocational Education and Training (1997–1998), Special Minister of State (1998–2001), Justice and Customs (2001–2007), and Human Services (2007).

== Background ==
Ellison was born on 15 June 1954 in Bulawayo, Southern Rhodesia (present-day Zimbabwe). His father was of English descent and his mother of Irish descent. He was educated at Trinity College, Perth and the University of Western Australia, where he gained a B.Juris (1977) and LLB (1978). He spent two years as a lawyer with the Legal Aid Commission of Western Australia, where he completed his articled clerkship. He was a barrister and solicitor as partner in his own law firm, Williams Ellison, for 13 years 1980–93.

He is known for his conservative and Catholic views, and is a strong constitutional monarchist and a member of the Australians for Constitutional Monarchy. He has voted against abortion and euthanasia.

In 2001, he was awarded a Centenary Medal for Service to Society. In 2017, he was named as the Chancellor of The University of Notre Dame Australia. He was appointed a Member of the Order of Australia in the 2026 King's Birthday Honours in recognition of his "significant service to the people and Parliament of Australia, to tertiary education administration, and to business".

He is married with three children.

== Political career ==
Ellison was elected as Senator for Western Australia in 1993, replacing Peter Durack, and immediately became involved in parliamentary committees and inquiries across a range of portfolios. He chaired the Senate Legal and Constitutional References Committee from 1993 to 1996, including chairing an inquiry which led to changes in Australia's treaty making process.

He entered the Howard ministry as Parliamentary Secretary to the Minister for Health and Family Services and to the Attorney-General in 1997. He was promoted to Minister for Customs and Consumer Affairs and Minister Assisting the Attorney-General 1997, Minister for Schools, Vocational Education and Training 1997-98 and Special Minister of State 1998–2001. He was Minister for Justice and Customs between January 2001 and March 2007.

From March 2007 until the defeat of the Howard government in the 2007 election, Ellison was a member of cabinet as Minister for Human Services, overseeing the service delivery of Government agencies including Centrelink, Medicare and the Child Support Agency. He held the offices of Shadow Minister for Immigration and Citizenship, along with Manager of Opposition Business in the Senate from December 2007 to September 2008.

Following the change of Government in November 2007, Senator Ellison was appointed as Shadow Minister for Immigration and Citizenship and Manager of Opposition Business in the Senate. In addition, Senator Ellison was the Chair of the Scrutiny of Bills Committee.

Senator Ellison is the longest serving Minister for Justice, with the portfolio abolished in 2017.

== Later career ==
On 17 September 2008, Ellison announced he would be resigning, stating that he would like to spend more time with his family. However, he did not formally resign until 30 January 2009. The casual vacancy caused by his resignation was filled by Chris Back.

Ellison was announced as chancellor of the University of Notre Dame Australia in 2017, with effect from 1 January 2018. He had previously served as a governor and director. He has additionally served as a director of construction firm Doric (2011–2015), chairman of the North West Tourism Board (2011–2015), and director of the Commonwealth Superannuation Corporation (2014–present).

Political offices
Preceded by Geoff Prosser	Minister for Customs and Consumer Affairs; 1997–1998	Succeeded by Warren Truss
Preceded by David Kemp	Minister for Schools, Vocational; Education and Training; 1997–1998	Title abolished
Preceded by Nick Minchin	Special Minister of State; 1998–2001	Succeeded by Eric Abetz
Preceded by Amanda Vanstone	Minister for Justice and Customs; 2001–2007	Succeeded by David Johnston
Preceded by Ian Campbell	Minister for Human Services; 2007	Succeeded by Joe Ludwig
