= Michael Lavarch =

Australian lawyer, politician, academic

The Honourable Michael Lavarch AO

Attorney-General of Australia
- In office 27 April 1993 – 11 March 1996
- Prime Minister: Paul Keating
- Preceded by: Duncan Kerr
- Succeeded by: Daryl Williams

Member of the Australian Parliament for Dickson
- In office 17 April 1993 – 2 March 1996
- Preceded by: New seat
- Succeeded by: Tony Smith

Member of the Australian Parliament for Fisher
- In office 11 July 1987 – 13 March 1993
- Preceded by: Peter Slipper
- Succeeded by: Peter Slipper

Personal details
- Born: 8 June 1961 (age 64)
- Party: Australian Labor Party
- Spouse(s): Linda Lavarch (1); Larissa Behrendt (2)
- Occupation: Lawyer

Michael Hugh Lavarch AO (born 8 June 1961) is an Australian lawyer, educator and former politician. He was the Attorney-General for Australia between 1993 and 1996, and from 2004 to 2012 was Executive Dean of the Faculty of Law at Queensland University of Technology (QUT), his alma mater, where he has been since then emeritus professor. As of August 2020 he is co-chair, with Jackie Huggins, of the Eminent Panel for the Indigenous treaty process in Queensland.

== Early life and education ==
Lavarch earned his Bachelor of Laws at the Queensland University of Technology (QUT).

== Career ==
Lavarch commenced his legal career in Brisbane as a solicitor. He gained Australian Labor Party endorsement for the electorate of Fisher in Queensland's Sunshine Coast, and was elected to the Federal Parliament at the 1987 election. He served three terms in the Parliament until 1996, being appointed Attorney-General of Australia in 1993.

By the 1993 election, boundary changes had erased Lavarch's majority and made Fisher notionally Liberal. Lavarch contested the newly created seat of Dickson in the outer northern suburbs of Brisbane, which covered much of the Brisbane portion of his former seat. Independent Walter Pegler died very shortly before the election, making it necessary to hold a supplementary election on 17 April (the rest of the country had already voted on 13 March). Following the return of the Labor Party to government, Prime Minister Paul Keating announced the makeup of the Second Keating Ministry to be sworn in on 24 March, but kept the portfolio of Attorney-General (outside Cabinet) open for Lavarch, subject to him winning Dickson on 17 April. Lavarch won the supplementary election, defeating future Queensland Liberal leader Bruce Flegg, and was duly appointed to the ministry on 27 April.

During his political career, he was particularly interested in human rights and native title issues. He was responsible for instigating the National Inquiry into the Separation of Aboriginal and Torres Strait Islander Children from Their Families in 1995, culminating in the publication of the Bringing Them Home Report.

He was defeated at the 1996 election, in which Labor was cut down to only two seats in Queensland. He then returned to his legal practice.

In 1998, Lavarch was elected as a Queensland delegate to the 4th Constitutional Convention in 1998 for the Australian Republican Movement.

He was secretary-general of the Law Council of Australia from 2001 to 2004. In 2003 he was appointed by the Prime Minister to an expert panel to review proposals to change the way in which conflicts between the House of Representatives and the Senate are resolved.

He was Executive Dean of the Faculty of Law at Queensland University of Technology from 2004 to 2012, after which he became emeritus Professor.

In 2019 the Queensland Government of Annastacia Palaszczuk announced its interest in pursuing a pathway to an Indigenous treaty process. The Treaty Working Group and Eminent Treaty Process Panel were set up, with Lavarch co-chairing the Eminent Panel along with Jackie Huggins. Their Path to Treaty Report was tabled in Queensland Parliament in February 2020. On 13 August 2020, the Government announced that it would be supporting the recommendation to move forward on a Path to Treaty with First Nations Queenslanders. Lavarch said the commitment to release the report enabled Queenslanders to see their input reflected and learn more about the consultation outcomes.

== Publications ==
Lavarch has written several book chapters and articles about Australia's legal and political systems, including co-editing Beyond the Adversarial System and writing an Issues Paper for AIATSIS in 1998.

== Personal life ==
Lavarch lives between Brisbane and Sydney with his wife, Indigenous academic, lawyer and writer, Larissa Behrendt.

Michael Lavarch was formerly married to Linda Lavarch. Linda had served as an Attorney General of Queensland from 2005 to 2009. At the 2016 election, she was the ALP candidate for her former husband's former seat of Dickson.

Political offices
Preceded by Duncan Kerr	Attorney-General of Australia; 1993–1996	Succeeded by Daryl Williams
Parliament of Australia
Preceded by Peter Slipper	Member for Fisher; 1987–1993	Succeeded by Peter Slipper
Preceded by Electorate created	Member for Dickson; 1993–1996	Succeeded by Tony Smith
