= David Johnston (Australian politician) =

Australian politician

The Honourable David Johnston
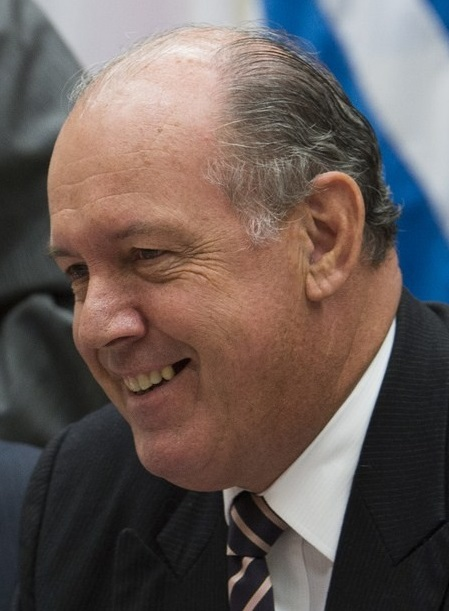

Minister for Defence
- In office 18 September 2013 – 23 December 2014
- Prime Minister: Tony Abbott
- Preceded by: Stephen Smith
- Succeeded by: Kevin Andrews

Minister for Justice and Customs
- In office 9 March 2007 – 3 December 2007
- Prime Minister: John Howard
- Preceded by: Chris Ellison
- Succeeded by: Bob Debus (as Minister for Home Affairs)

Senator for Western Australia
- In office 30 June 2002 – 2 July 2016
- Preceded by: Winston Crane
- Succeeded by: Louise Pratt

Personal details
- Born: 14 February 1956 (age 70) Perth, Australia
- Party: Liberal Party
- Other political affiliations: Coalition
- Spouse: Toni Hodge
- Children: 3
- Education: University of Western Australia

David Albert Lloyd Johnston (born 14 February 1956) is an Australian politician who was a Liberal Party member of the Australian Senate from 2002 to 2016, representing the state of Western Australia. Johnston was the Minister for Defence from 18 September 2013 to 23 December 2014, when he was replaced by Kevin Andrews.

== Background and career ==
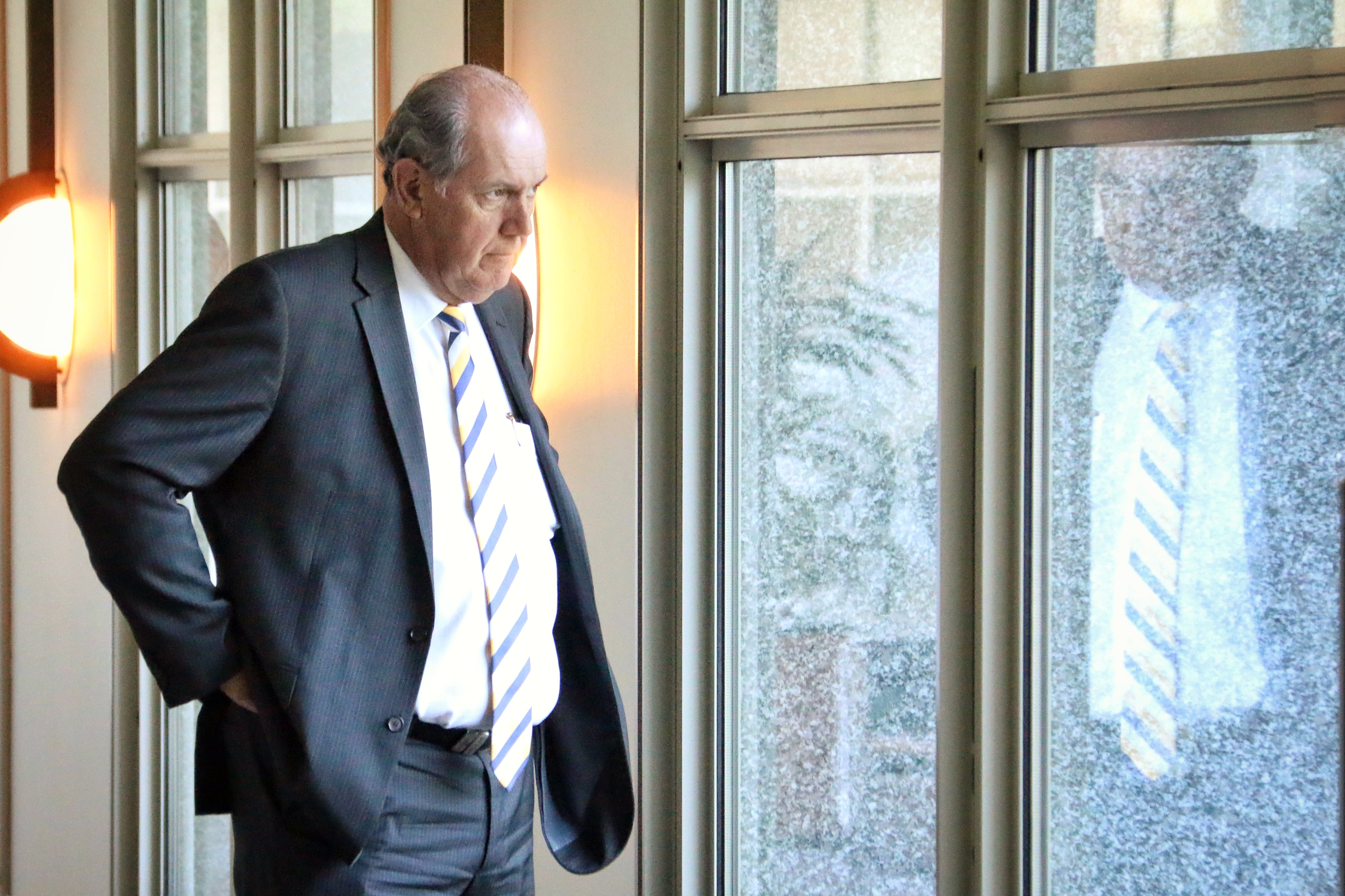
Johnston in 2016

Johnston was born in Perth and was educated at Wesley College and the University of Western Australia, where he graduated in law. He was a barrister in Kalgoorlie before entering politics, representing companies such as Gold Mines of Kalgoorlie LTD and North Kalgurli Mines LTD. He unsuccessfully contested the House of Representatives at the 1987 federal election, polling 37.3% of first preferences to finish second behind the then Labor incumbent Graeme Campbell in the Division of Kalgoorlie.

Johnston successfully stood for a WA Senate seat in the federal election on 10 November 2001. He assumed office on 1 July 2002 and on 6 March 2007 was made Minister for Justice and Customs (effective 9 March), following the move of former Justice minister Chris Ellison to the Human Services portfolio.

Malcolm Turnbull, on becoming Leader of the Opposition, promoted Johnston to the Shadow Cabinet as Shadow Minister for Defence. In September 2010 he was re-appointed to that role by Opposition leader, Tony Abbott, after the 2010 election.

Following the 2013 federal election, Johnston was sworn in as Minister for Defence, effective 18 September 2013.

=== Comments on ASC ===
In November 2014, Johnston came under fire for comments regarding the government owned defence building company, the Australian Submarine Corporation. In comments to the senate he stated that ASC was delivering no submarines for one billion dollars and that they were over $350,000,000 over budget on three air warfare destroyer builds and that it was probably more than six hundred million but the bad data could not grant him an answer and then he said "You wonder why I'm worried about ASC and what they're delivering to the Australian taxpayer, you wonder why I wouldn't trust them to build a canoe?". The South Australian Liberal Party demanded an apology for the senator's remarks and the federal Labor opposition called for the senator's resignation from the Defence portfolio. Johnston indicated he regretted his comments the next day, calling it a "rhetorical flourish". Opposition Senate Leader Penny Wong moved a motion to censure Johnston for his remarks on the ASC, as well as his handling of the ADF staff pay cut. The motion passed 37 to 31 votes.

Much of the anti-Liberal swing at the 2014 Fisher state by-election in South Australia, where Labor won the traditionally Liberal seat by just five votes from a 7.27 percent two-party swing to go from minority to majority government, was attributed to Johnston's "I wouldn't trust them to build a canoe" remark toward South Australia's Australian Submarine Corporation, occurring just several days out from the by-election. The unpopularity of then Prime Minister Tony Abbott was cited as the other main factor.

=== Leaked dinner receipts ===
In December 2014, less than a month after his comments on the ASC were made, News Corp leaked images of receipts totalling thousands of dollars allegedly used by Senator Johnston's government-issued credit card to pay for the dinners of a number of companies vying for a contract to build the Collins-class submarine replacement project. Items on the receipts came to a total of $6,384 and sometimes cost up to $300 a head as well as including $200 bottles of wine. After the leak was released two staffers from the senators office resigned but neither were accused of being responsible for the leak. A spokesperson for Senator Johnston responded by saying "All hospitality hosted by the Defence Minister and extended to foreign dignitaries or industry heads, including at the time of the Albany Commemoration, has been within guidelines and is consistent with previous defence ministers' practice" and that the senator's office was investigating the leaks and would not comment any further.

Parliament of Australia
Preceded by Winston Crane	Australian Senator for Western Australia; 2002–2016	Succeeded by Louise Pratt
Political offices
Preceded by Chris Ellison	Minister for Justice and Customs; 2007	Succeeded by Bob Debus as Minister for Home Affairs
Preceded by Stephen Smith	Minister for Defence; 2013–2014	Succeeded by Kevin Andrews
