= 1993 Australian federal election =

- 13 March 1993 (Note: The election in the seat of Dickson was deferred to 17 April 1993.)

All 147 seats in the House of Representatives 74 seats were needed for a majority in the House 40 (of the 76) seats in the Senate
- Registered: 11,384,638 ▲6.12%
- Turnout: 10,900,861 (95.75%) (▲0.44 pp)
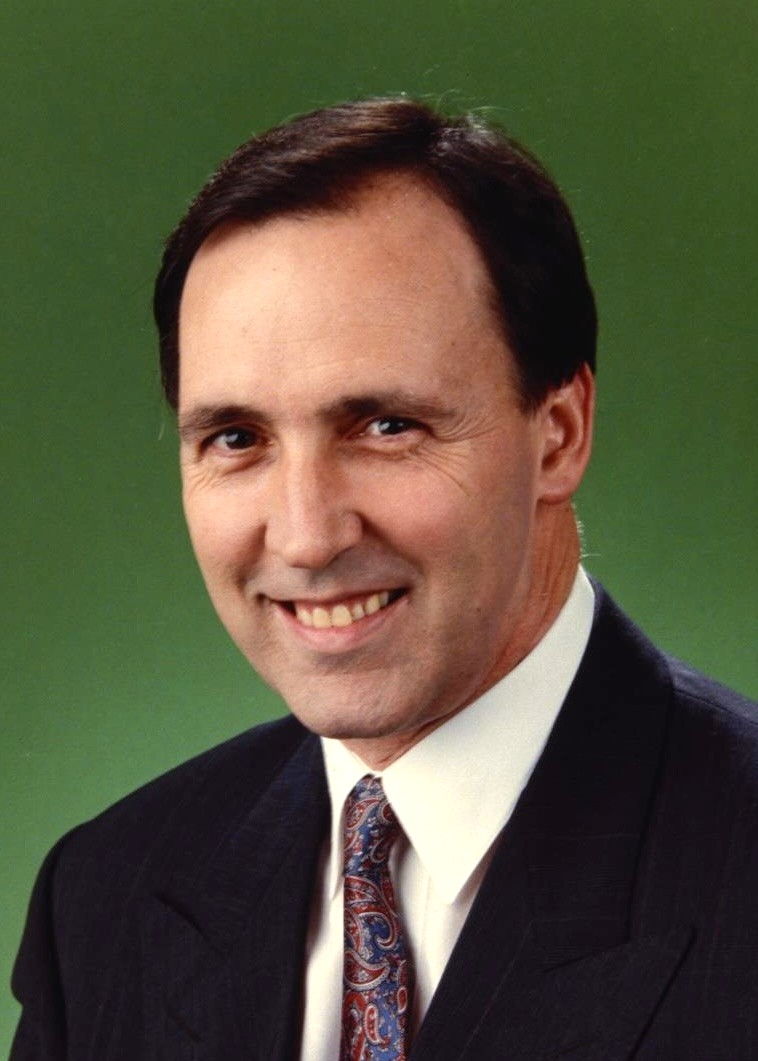

	First party	Second party
Leader	Paul Keating	John Hewson
Party	Labor	Coalition
Leader since	19 December 1991	3 April 1990
Leader's seat	Blaxland (NSW)	Wentworth (NSW)
Last election	78 seats	69 seats
Seats won	80	65
Seat change	▲2	▼4
Primary vote	4,751,390	4,681,822
Percentage	44.92%	44.27%
Swing	▲5.49%	▲0.81%
TPP	51.44%	48.56%
TPP swing	▲1.54%	▼1.54%
- Results by division for the House of Representatives, shaded by winning party's margin of victory.
Prime Minister before election
Paul Keating
Labor
Subsequent Prime Minister
Paul Keating
Labor

A federal election was held in Australia on 13 March 1993 to determine the members of the 37th Parliament of Australia. All 147 seats of the Australian House of Representatives and 40 seats of the 76-seat Australian Senate were up for election. The incumbent government of the centre-left Australian Labor Party led by Paul Keating, the prime minister of Australia, was re-elected to a fifth term, defeating the centre-right Liberal/National Coalition led by Opposition Leader John Hewson of the Liberal Party of Australia, and coalition partner Tim Fischer of the National Party of Australia. This was the first, and to date only, time the Labor Party won a fifth consecutive election.

The result was considered an upset, as opinion polls had predicted a Coalition win. In his victory speech, Keating would famously describe the result as "the sweetest victory of all". The Coalition's loss was attributed to the unpopularity of Hewson and his economic policy, popularly known as Fightback!, with the set piece being the divisive Goods and Services Tax (GST). This was the first of two elections fought mainly on the question of the GST, the second being two elections later in 1998.

This would be the last time that the Labor Party won a majority at the federal level until the 2007 election as the next four elections would produce Coalition victories. It also remains the only time that the Liberal Party was led by a leader who previously had no experience as a minister.

== Background ==
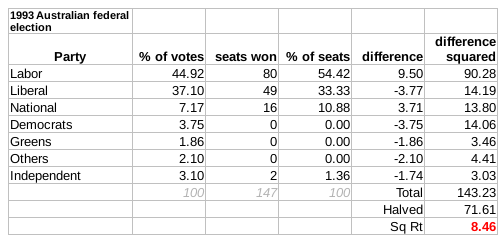
The Gallagher Index result: 8.46

This was the first election after the end of the late 80s and early 90s recession. The opposition Liberal Party was led by John Hewson, a former professor of economics at the University of New South Wales who succeeded Liberal leader Andrew Peacock in 1990.

In November 1991 the Liberal Party launched the 650-page Fightback! policy document — a radical collection of "dry", economic liberal measures including:

- the introduction of a Goods and Services Tax (GST) of 15%,
- various changes to Medicare including the abolition of bulk billing for non-concession holders,
- the introduction of a nine-month limit on unemployment benefits,
- various changes to industrial relations including the abolition of industrial award,
- a $13 billion personal income tax cut directed at middle and upper income earners,
- $10 billion in government spending cuts,
- the abolition of state payroll taxes and the privatisation of a large number of government-owned enterprises.

All of this presented a vision of a very different future direction to the Keynesian economic conservatism practiced by previous Liberal/National Coalition governments. The 15 percent GST was the centrepiece of the policy document.

Following the December 1991 Labor leadership spill, where former Treasurer Paul Keating ousted Bob Hawke as leader of the Labor Party and subsequently Prime Minister, Keating mounted a campaign against the Fightback! package, and particularly against the GST throughout 1992. Keating described the GST as an attack on the working-class in that it shifted the tax burden from direct taxation of the wealthy to indirect taxation as a broad-based consumption tax. Pressure group activity, public opinion and Keating himself were highly critical of the GST, which led Hewson to exempt food from the proposed GST. However the exclusions announced by Hewson led to questions surrounding the complexity of what precisely which food items would and would not be exempt from the GST. Hewson's difficulty in explaining this to the electorate was exemplified in the infamous birthday cake interview, considered by some as a turning point in the election campaign. Keating won a record fifth consecutive term for the Labor Party and a record 13 years in government at the 1993 election, a level of political success not previously seen by federal Labor. A number of the proposals were later adopted in to law in some form, to a small extent during the Keating Labor government, and to a larger extent during the John Howard Liberal government (most famously the GST, becoming law on 1 July 2000), while unemployment benefits and bulk billing were re-targeted for a time by the Tony Abbott Liberal government.

The Australian Electoral Study conducted after the election showed 70 per cent of respondents had tuned in to the Keating-Hewson televised debates, the highest ever viewership for Australian election debates. Nine Network debates saw the infamous "worm" being introduced for the first time to its screens during the debate. The "worm" wriggled along the bottom of the screen, rising and falling away on the reactions of a chosen audience. It was reported that Keating scored big-time with the worm when he savaged Hewson over his plans for a GST during the debate.

The election-eve Newspoll reported the Liberal Party and National Party Coalition on a 50.5 percent two-party-preferred vote, with Paul Keating's personal ratings being significantly negative.

For the first time since the 1966 election, an incumbent government had increased their two-party-preferred vote.

There was an unusual circumstance in the division of Dickson (QLD). One of the candidates, an independent, died very shortly before the election, making it necessary to hold a supplementary election on 17 April. Following the return of the Labor Party to government, Keating announced the makeup of the Second Keating Ministry to be sworn in on 24 March, but kept the portfolio of Attorney-General of Australia open for Michael Lavarch subject to him winning Dickson on 17 April. He won the seat, and was appointed to the ministry on 27 April.

== Results ==
=== House of Representatives results ===
Government (80) Labor (80) Opposition (65) Coalition Liberal (49) National (16) Crossbench (2) Independent (2)

House of Reps (IRV) – 1993–36 – Turnout 95.75% (CV) — Informal 2.97%
Party	Votes	%	Swing	Seats	Change
Labor	4,751,390	44.92	+5.49	80	▲2
Liberal	3,888,579	36.77	+2.01	49	▼6
National	758,036	7.17	–1.25	16	▲2
Country Liberal	35,207	0.33	+0.05	0	Steady
Liberal–National Coalition	4,681,822	44.27	+0.81	65	▼4
Democrats	397,060	3.75	–7.51		
Independents (Note: The elected independents were Ted Mack (NSW) and Phil Cleary (Victoria).)	329,235	3.11	+0.35	2	▲1
Greens (Note: The Australian Greens were founded in 1992, but not all state and territory organisations immediately affiliated to the new federal party. The Greens total includes unaffiliated local groups in New South Wales (Note: The Greens total in New South Wales includes the local groups for Lowe, Page, Reid, Robertson and Wentworth.) (11,685), Queensland Greens (58,502), Greens Western Australia (55,907), Greens South Australia (1,496), Tasmanian Greens (24,319), and ACT Green Democratic Alliance (3,109).)	196,702	1.85	+0.48		
Others	220,570	2.09	0.38		
Total	10,576,779			147	▼1
Two-party-preferred vote
Labor	5,436,421	51.44	+1.54	80	▲2
Liberal–National Coalition	5,133,033	48.56	–1.54	65	▼4
Invalid/blank votes	324,082	2.97			
Turnout	10,900,861	95.75			
Registered voters	11,384,638				
Source: Federal Elections 1993

Popular vote
Labor	44.92%
Liberal	37.10%
National	7.17%
Democrats	3.75%
Greens	1.86%
Independents	3.10%
Other	2.10%

Two-party-preferred vote
Labor	51.44%
Coalition	48.56%

Parliament seats
Labor	54.42%
Coalition	44.22%
Independents	1.36%

=== Senate results ===
Government (30) Labor (30) Opposition (36) Coalition Liberal (29) National (6) CLP (1) Crossbench (10) Democrats (7) Greens (2) Independent (1)

Senate (STV GV) — 1993–96 – Turnout 96.22% (CV) — Informal 2.55%
Party	Votes	%	Swing	Seats won	Seats held	Change
Labor	4,643,871	43.50	+5.09	17	30	▼2
Liberal–National joint ticket	2,605,157	24.40	–0.07	6	N/A	N/A
Liberal	1,664,204	15.59	+1.03	11	29	Steady
National	290,382	2.72	+0.12	1	6	▲2
Country Liberal	35,405	0.33	+0.04	1	1	Steady
Liberal–National coalition	4,595,148	43.05	+1.13	19	36	▲2
Democrats	566,944	5.31	–7.32	2	7	▼1
Greens (Note: The Greens Senate total includes Queensland Greens (59,303), Greens Western Australia (53,757), New South Wales Green Alliance (46,971), ACT Green Democratic Alliance (46,971), Tasmanian Greens (21,087) and Greens South Australia (15,467).)	314,845	2.95	+0.85	1	2	▲1
Others (Note: The independent senator was Brian Harradine (Tasmania).)	553,997	5.2	+0.15	1	1	Steady
Total	10,674,805			40	76	
Invalid/blank votes	279,453	2.55				
Turnout	10,954,258	96.22				
Registered voters	11,384,638					
Source: Federal Elections 1993

== Seats changing hands ==
Seat	Pre-1993			Swing	Post-1993		
Seat	Party	Member	Margin	Swing	Margin	Member	Party
Adelaide, SA	Labor	Bob Catley	1.84	3.15	1.31	Trish Worth	Liberal
Bass, Tas	Liberal	Warwick Smith	4.51	4.54	0.03	Silvia Smith	Labor
Corinella, Vic	Liberal	Russell Broadbent	0.73	4.47	3.74	Alan Griffin	Labor
Cowan, WA	Labor	Carolyn Jakobsen	0.85	1.78	0.93	Richard Evans	Liberal
Dunkley, Vic	Liberal	Frank Ford	1.20	1.81	0.61	Bob Chynoweth	Labor
Fisher, Qld	Labor	Michael Lavarch	1.90	7.26	5.36	Peter Slipper	Liberal
Franklin, Tas	Liberal	Bruce Goodluck	2.21	9.64	7.43	Harry Quick	Labor
Grey, SA	Labor	Lloyd O'Neil	2.03	4.11	2.08	Barry Wakelin	Liberal
Hindmarsh, SA	Labor	John Scott	0.97	2.61	1.64	Chris Gallus	Liberal
Hinkler, Qld	Labor	Brian Courtice	4.40	4.62	0.22	Paul Neville	National
Hume, NSW	Liberal	Wal Fife	8.14	N/A	3.70	John Sharp	National
Kennedy, Qld	Labor	Rob Hulls	1.90	4.78	2.88	Bob Katter	National
Lowe, NSW	Liberal	Bob Woods	0.6	4.5	5.0	Mary Easson	Labor
Lyons, Tas	Liberal	Max Burr	1.94	5.72	3.78	Dick Adams	Labor
Macquarie, NSW	Liberal	Alasdair Webster	1.78	1.90	0.12	Maggie Deahm	Labor
McEwen, Vic	Liberal	Fran Bailey	3.21	3.90	0.69	Peter Cleeland	Labor
McMillan, Vic	Liberal	John Riggall	4.44	4.84	0.40	Barry Cunningham	Labor
Stirling, WA	Labor	Ron Edwards	0.18	1.65	1.47	Eoin Cameron	Liberal

- The Labor Party won the seat of Lowe (NSW) which was made notionally Labor-held in the redistribution.
- The Liberal Party won the seat of Fisher (Qld) which was made notionally Liberal-held in the redistribution.
- The National Party won the seat of Hume (NSW) which was made notionally National-held in the redistribution.
- Members listed in italics did not contest their seat at this election

== See also ==
- Candidates of the Australian federal election, 1993
- Members of the Australian House of Representatives, 1993–1996
- Members of the Australian Senate, 1993–1996
- Birthday cake interview – Hewson's difficulty in explaining how GST would apply to a birthday cake during a news interview said to have contributed to Hewson's defeat.
