= Attorney-General of Australia =

Minister and chief law officer of Australia

- Commonwealth Coat of Arms

- Flag of Australia

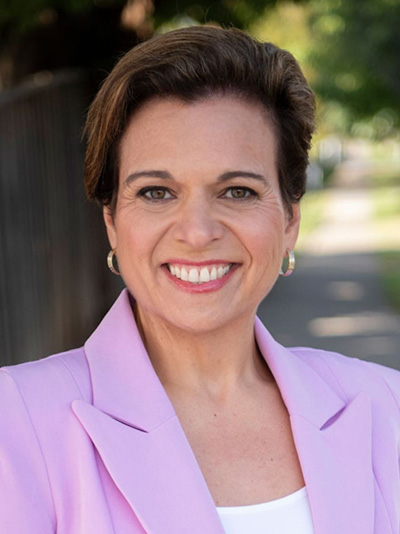
- Incumbent; Michelle Rowland since 13 May 2025
- Attorney-General's Department
- Style: The Honourable (formal); Attorney-General (spoken)
- Member of: Cabinet of Australia; Federal Executive Council; National Security Committee; Indigenous Policy Committee; Governance Committee
- Seat: Canberra, ACT
- Appointer: Governor-General; on the advice of the prime minister
- Term length: At the Governor-General's pleasure
- Formation: 1 January 1901
- First holder: Alfred Deakin
- Salary: $336,599.25
- Website: ministers.ag.gov.au/hon-michelle-rowland-mp

The attorney-general of Australia (AG), also known as the Commonwealth attorney-general, is the minister of state and chief law officer of the Commonwealth of Australia charged with overseeing federal legal affairs and public security as the head of the Attorney-General’s Department. The current attorney-general is Michelle Rowland, who was chosen by Prime Minister Anthony Albanese in May 2025 following the 2025 federal election. By convention, the attorney-general is a lawyer.

The attorney-general is one of only four positions in the Commonwealth Government to have continuously been held since federation, along with the prime minister, the minister for defence and the treasurer.

== History ==
Every permanent attorney-general has been a person with legal training, and eleven former attorneys-general have received senior judicial appointments after their ministerial service.

Billy Hughes was the longest-serving attorney-general of Australia, serving for thirteen and a half years over four non-consecutive terms; this included six years during his own prime ministership.

Historically, the attorney-generalship was seen as a stepping stone to higher office – Alfred Deakin, Billy Hughes, and Robert Menzies all became prime minister, while John Latham, H. V. Evatt, and Billy Snedden were leaders of the opposition. Lionel Bowen was deputy prime minister under Bob Hawke in the 1980s. Additionally, four former attorneys-general have won appointment to the High Court – Isaac Isaacs, H. B. Higgins, John Latham, Garfield Barwick, and Lionel Murphy. Isaacs later became governor-general.

== Role and functions ==
=== Role ===
The attorney-general is the minister responsible for legal affairs, national and public security. The attorney-general also serves as a general legal adviser to the Cabinet, and has carriage of legislation dealing with copyright, human rights and a range of other subjects. They are responsible for the Australian Law Reform Commission among other agencies.

=== Functions ===
Functions of the state and federal attorneys-general include the administration of the selection of persons for nomination to judicial posts and the authorizing of prosecutions. In normal circumstances, the prosecutorial powers of the attorney-general are exercised by the Director of Public Prosecutions and staff; however, the attorney-general maintains formal control—including the power to initiate and terminate public prosecutions and take over private prosecutions.

Statutory criminal law provides that prosecutions for certain offences require the individual consent of the attorney-general. This is generally for offences whose illegality is of a somewhat controversial nature or where there is perceived to be a significant risk that prosecutions of a political nature may be embarked upon. The attorney-general also generally has the power to issue certificates legally conclusive of certain facts (e.g., that the revelation of certain matters in court proceedings might constitute a risk to national security); the facts stated in such certificates must be accepted by the courts and cannot legally be disputed by any parties. The attorney-general also has the power to issue a nolle prosequi with respect to a case, which authoritatively determines that the state (in whose name prosecutions are brought) does not wish to prosecute the case, so preventing any person from doing so.

=== Relationship with the Australian Security Intelligence Organisation ===
In July 2018, then-Prime Minister Malcolm Turnbull announced the creation of the Department of Home Affairs - a new ministry to include the Australian Federal Police, the Australian Border Force, and the Australian Security Intelligence Organisation. This meant the transfer of ASIO away from the Attorney-General's Department, although the Attorney-General would remain responsible for approving ASIO warrants. This move was somewhat criticised, with John Blaxland from the Australian National University warning against tampering with a system that was "arguably the envy of the world", saying "I have yet to see any compelling evidence that what we have is not working, or that there is a compellingly better option out there."

In July 2024, it was reported that ASIO was to be moved back to its original setting within the Attorney-General's Department. Under the new arrangement, the Department of Home Affairs retains responsibility for national security policy, its design and implementation, while operational control of ASIO shifts back to the Attorney-General's Department.

== List of attorneys-general ==
The following individuals have been appointed as attorney-general for Australia:

Order	Minister	Party	Prime Minister	Prior legal experience	Alma mater	Term start	Term end	Term in office
1	Alfred Deakin KC	Protectionist	Barton	Barrister	University of Melbourne	1 January 1901	24 September 1903	2 years, 266 days
2	Senator James Drake	Protectionist	Deakin	Barrister	King's College School, London	24 September 1903	27 April 1904	216 days
3	H. B. Higgins QC	Protectionist^{1}	Watson	Barrister	University of Melbourne	27 April 1904	17 August 1904	112 days
4	Senator Sir Josiah Symon, KCMG, QC	Free Trade	Reid	Barrister	Free Church Training College	17 August 1904	5 July 1905	322 days
5	Isaac Isaacs QC	Protectionist	Deakin	Barrister	University of Melbourne	5 July 1905	12 October 1906	1 year, 99 days
6	Littleton Groom KC	Protectionist	Deakin	Lawyer	University of Melbourne	12 October 1906	13 November 1908	2 years, 32 days
7	Billy Hughes, KC^{2}	Labor	Fisher	Barrister	n/a	13 November 1908	2 June 1909	201 days
8	Paddy Glynn, KCMG, KC	Commonwealth; Liberal	Deakin	Barrister	Trinity College Dublin	2 June 1909	29 April 1910	331 days
n/a	Billy Hughes KC	Labor	Fisher	Barrister	n/a	29 April 1910	24 June 1913	3 years, 56 days
9	William Irvine KC	Commonwealth; Liberal	Cook	Barrister	Trinity College, Dublin; University of Melbourne	24 June 1913	17 September 1914	1 year, 85 days
n/a	Billy Hughes KC	Labor	Fisher	Barrister	n/a	17 September 1914	27 October 1915	7 years, 95 days
n/a	Billy Hughes KC	Labor	Hughes	Barrister	n/a	27 October 1915	14 November 1916	7 years, 95 days
n/a	Billy Hughes KC	National Labor	Hughes	Barrister	n/a	14 November 1916	13 June 1917	7 years, 95 days
n/a	Billy Hughes KC	Nationalist	Hughes	Barrister	n/a	13 June 1917	21 December 1921	7 years, 95 days
n/a	Sir Littleton Groom, KCMG, KC	Nationalist	Hughes	Lawyer	University of Melbourne	21 December 1921	9 February 1923	3 years, 362 days
n/a	Sir Littleton Groom, KCMG, KC	Nationalist	Bruce	Lawyer	University of Melbourne	9 February 1923	18 December 1925	3 years, 362 days
10	John Latham KC	Nationalist	Bruce	Barrister	University of Melbourne	18 December 1925	22 October 1929	3 years, 308 days
11	Frank Brennan	Labor	Scullin	Barrister	University of Melbourne	22 October 1929	6 January 1932	2 years, 76 days
n/a	Sir John Latham, GCMG, KC	United Australia	Lyons	Barrister	University of Melbourne	6 January 1932	12 October 1934	2 years, 279 days
12	Robert Menzies KC	United Australia	Lyons	Barrister	University of Melbourne	12 October 1934	20 March 1939	4 years, 159 days
n/a	Billy Hughes, CH, KC	United Australia	Lyons	Barrister	n/a	20 March 1939	7 April 1939	2 years, 201 days
n/a	Billy Hughes, CH, KC	United Australia	Page	Barrister	n/a	7 April 1939	26 April 1939	2 years, 201 days
n/a	Billy Hughes, CH, KC	United Australia	Menzies	Barrister	n/a	26 April 1939	29 August 1941	2 years, 201 days
n/a	Billy Hughes, CH, KC	United Australia	Fadden	Barrister	n/a	29 August 1941	7 October 1941	2 years, 201 days
13	H. V. Evatt KC	Labor	Curtin	Barrister, Judge	University of Sydney	7 October 1941	6 July 1945	8 years, 73 days
13	H. V. Evatt KC	Labor	Forde	Barrister, Judge	University of Sydney	6 July 1945	13 July 1945	8 years, 73 days
13	H. V. Evatt KC	Labor	Chifley	Barrister, Judge	University of Sydney	13 July 1945	19 December 1949	8 years, 73 days
14	Senator John Spicer KC	Liberal	Menzies	Barrister	University of Melbourne	19 December 1949	14 August 1956	6 years, 239 days
15	Senator Neil O'Sullivan	Liberal	Menzies	Solicitor		15 August 1956	12 October 1958	2 years, 58 days
16	Sir Garfield Barwick QC	Liberal	Menzies	Barrister	University of Sydney	12 October 1958	4 March 1964	5 years, 144 days
17	Billy Snedden QC	Liberal	Menzies	Barrister	University of Western Australia	4 March 1964	26 January 1966	2 years, 285 days
17	Billy Snedden QC	Liberal	Holt	Barrister	University of Western Australia	26 January 1966	14 December 1966	2 years, 285 days
18	Nigel Bowen QC	Liberal	Holt	Barrister	University of Sydney	14 December 1966	19 December 1967	2 years, 333 days
18	Nigel Bowen QC	Liberal	McEwen	Barrister	University of Sydney	19 December 1967	10 January 1968	2 years, 333 days
18	Nigel Bowen QC	Liberal	Gorton	Barrister	University of Sydney	10 January 1968	12 November 1969	2 years, 333 days
19	Tom Hughes QC	Liberal	Gorton	Barrister	University of Sydney	12 November 1969	10 March 1971	1 year, 130 days
19	Tom Hughes QC	Liberal	McMahon	Barrister	University of Sydney	10 March 1971	22 March 1971	1 year, 130 days
n/a	Nigel Bowen	Liberal	McMahon	Barrister	University of Sydney	22 March 1971	2 August 1971	133 days
20	Senator Ivor Greenwood QC	Liberal	McMahon	Barrister	University of Melbourne	2 August 1971	5 December 1972	1 year, 125 days
21	Gough Whitlam QC^{3}	Labor	Whitlam	Barrister	University of Sydney	5 December 1972	19 December 1972	14 days
22	Senator Lionel Murphy QC	Labor	Whitlam	Barrister	University of Sydney	19 December 1972	10 February 1975	2 years, 53 days
23	Kep Enderby QC	Labor	Whitlam	Barrister	University of Sydney; University of London	10 February 1975	11 November 1975	274 days
n/a	Senator Ivor Greenwood QC	Liberal	Fraser	Barrister	University of Melbourne	11 November 1975	22 December 1975	41 days
24	Bob Ellicott QC	Liberal	Fraser	Barrister	University of Sydney	22 December 1975	6 September 1977	1 year, 258 days
25	Senator Peter Durack QC	Liberal	Fraser	Barrister	University of Western Australia; Lincoln College, Oxford	6 September 1977	11 March 1983	5 years, 186 days
26	Senator Gareth Evans QC	Labor	Hawke	Barrister	University of Melbourne; Magdalen College, Oxford	11 March 1983	13 December 1984	1 year, 277 days
27	Lionel Bowen	Labor	Hawke	Solicitor	University of Sydney	13 December 1984	4 April 1990	5 years, 112 days
28	Michael Duffy, ONZ	Labor	Hawke	Solicitor	University of Melbourne	4 April 1990	27 December 1991	2 years, 354 days
28	Michael Duffy, ONZ	Labor	Keating	Solicitor	University of Melbourne	27 December 1991	24 March 1993	2 years, 354 days
29	Duncan Kerr^{4}	Labor	Keating	Barrister	University of Tasmania	1 April 1993	27 April 1993	26 days
30	Michael Lavarch	Labor	Keating	Solicitor	Queensland University of Technology	27 April 1993	11 March 1996	2 years, 319 days
31	Daryl Williams, AM, QC	Liberal	Howard	Barrister	University of Western Australia; Wadham College, Oxford	11 March 1996	7 October 2003	7 years, 210 days
32	Philip Ruddock	Liberal	Howard	Solicitor	University of Sydney	7 October 2003	3 December 2007	4 years, 57 days
33	Robert McClelland	Labor	Rudd	Solicitor	University of New South Wales; University of Sydney	3 December 2007	24 June 2010	4 years, 11 days
33	Robert McClelland	Labor	Gillard	Solicitor	University of New South Wales; University of Sydney	24 June 2010	14 December 2011	4 years, 11 days
34	Nicola Roxon	Labor	Gillard	Solicitor	University of Melbourne	14 December 2011	2 February 2013	1 year, 50 days
35	Mark Dreyfus QC	Labor	Gillard	Barrister	University of Melbourne	2 February 2013	26 June 2013	228 days
35	Mark Dreyfus QC	Labor	Rudd	Barrister	University of Melbourne	26 June 2013	18 September 2013	228 days
36	Senator George Brandis QC	Liberal	Abbott	Barrister	University of Queensland; Magdalen College, Oxford	18 September 2013	15 September 2015	4 years, 93 days
36	Senator George Brandis QC	Liberal	Turnbull	Barrister	University of Queensland; Magdalen College, Oxford	15 September 2015	20 December 2017	4 years, 93 days
37	Christian Porter	Liberal	Turnbull	Lawyer	University of Western Australia, London School of Economics	20 December 2017	28 August 2018	3 years, 100 days
37	Christian Porter	Liberal	Morrison	Lawyer	University of Western Australia, London School of Economics	28 August 2018	30 March 2021	3 years, 100 days
38	Senator Michaelia Cash	Liberal	Morrison	Solicitor	Curtin University; University of London; University of Western Australia	30 March 2021	23 May 2022	1 year, 54 days
n/a	Senator Katy Gallagher ^{5}	Labor	Albanese	n/a	Australian National University	23 May 2022	1 June 2022	9 days
(35)	Mark Dreyfus KC	Labor	Albanese	Barrister	University of Melbourne	1 June 2022	13 May 2025	2 years, 346 days
39	Michelle Rowland	Labor	Albanese	Lawyer	University of Sydney	13 May 2025	Incumbent	1 year, 171 days

Notes

^{1} A member of the Protectionist Party, Higgins served in the Labor ministry of Chris Watson, because Labor had no suitably qualified lawyer in Parliament.
^{2} Hughes took silk in 1909, and became a King's Counsel.
^{3} Whitlam served as part of a two-man ministry together with Lance Barnard for fourteen days, until the full ministry was commissioned.
^{4} Prime Minister Paul Keating's original choice for Attorney-General in 1993 had been Michael Lavarch, but Lavarch's re-election was delayed by the death of an opposing candidate for the seat of Dickson; Duncan Kerr held the portfolio in the interim until Lavarch won the resulting supplementary election. Kerr served as Attorney-General for 26 days. There was no Attorney-General for the eight days between Duffy's commission ending on 24 March 1993 and Kerr's commission commencing on 1 April 1993.
^{5} Gallagher served as part of an interim five-person ministry for nine days, until the full ministry was commissioned.

== Former ministerial titles ==
=== List of ministers for justice ===
The following individuals were appointed as Minister for Justice, or any of its precedent titles:

Order	Minister	Party	Prime Minister	Title	Term start	Term end	Term in office
1	Kep Enderby	Labor	Whitlam	Minister for Police and Customs	27 March 1975	6 June 1975	71 days
2	Jim Cavanagh	Labor	Whitlam	Minister for Police and Customs	6 June 1975	11 November 1975	158 days
3	Ivor Greenwood	Liberal	Fraser	Minister for Police and Customs	11 November 1975	22 December 1975	41 days
4	Michael Tate	Labor	Hawke	Minister for Justice	18 September 1987	4 April 1990	5 years, 187 days
4	Michael Tate	Labor	Hawke	Minister for Justice and Consumer Affairs	4 April 1990	20 December 1991	5 years, 187 days
4	Michael Tate	Labor	Keating	Minister for Justice and Consumer Affairs	20 December 1991	27 May 1992	5 years, 187 days
4	Michael Tate	Labor	Keating	Minister for Justice	27 May 1992	24 March 1993	5 years, 187 days
5	Duncan Kerr	Labor	Keating	Minister for Justice	24 March 1993	11 March 1996	2 years, 353 days
6	Daryl Williams	Liberal	Howard	Minister for Justice	11 March 1996	9 October 1997	1 year, 212 days
7	Amanda Vanstone	Liberal	Howard	Minister for Justice	9 October 1997	21 October 1998	3 years, 113 days
7	Amanda Vanstone	Liberal	Howard	Minister for Justice and Customs	21 October 1998	30 January 2001	3 years, 113 days
8	Chris Ellison	Liberal	Howard	Minister for Justice and Customs	30 January 2001	9 March 2007	6 years, 38 days
9	David Johnston	Liberal	Howard	Minister for Justice and Customs	9 March 2007	3 December 2007	269 days
10	Brendan O'Connor	Labor	Gillard	Minister for Justice	14 September 2010	14 December 2011	1 year, 91 days
11	Jason Clare	Labor	Gillard	Minister for Justice	14 December 2011	1 July 2013	1 year, 278 days
11	Jason Clare	Labor	Rudd	Minister for Justice	1 July 2013	18 September 2013	1 year, 278 days
12	Michael Keenan	Liberal	Abbott	Minister for Justice	18 September 2013	15 September 2015	4 years, 93 days
12	Michael Keenan	Liberal	Turnbull	Minister for Justice	15 September 2015	20 December 2017	4 years, 93 days
13	Angus Taylor	Liberal	Turnbull	Minister for Law Enforcement and Cybersecurity	20 December 2017	28 August 2018	251 days

== Parliamentary secretaries ==
While previously there existed informal titles for junior ministers, since 1980 they have been officially designated parliamentary-secretaries. They have also been titled assistant minister and minister assisting. Parliamentary-secretaries to the attorney-general are listed below.

In 2022, Matt Thistlethwaite was titled the Assistant Minister for the Republic and was tasked with promoting the Albanese government's policy of establishing of a republic. However, he was also formally the Parliamentary Secretary to the Attorney-General.

Minister	Party	Prime Minister	Title	Term start	Term end	Term in office
Neil Brown	Liberal	Fraser	Minister assisting the Attorney-General	7 May 1982	11 March 1983	
Peter Duncan	Labor	Keating	Parliamentary Secretary to the Attorney-General	27 December 1991	11 March 1996	
Chris Ellison	Liberal	Howard	Parliamentary Secretary to the Attorney-General	13 February 1997	18 July 1997	
Chris Ellison	Liberal	Howard	Minister assisting the Attorney-General	18 July 1997	9 October 1997	
Shayne Neumann	Labor	Gillard	Parliamentary Secretary to the Attorney-General	25 March 2013	18 September 2013	
Concetta Fierravanti-Wells	Liberal	Abbott	Parliamentary Secretary to the Attorney-General	28 May 2015	21 September 2015	116 days
Amanda Stoker	Liberal	Morrison	Assistant Minister to the Attorney-General	22 December 2020	23 May 2022	1 year, 152 days
Matt Thistlethwaite	Labor	Albanese	Assistant Minister for the Republic	1 June 2022	29 July 2024	2 years, 58 days
Patrick Gorman	Labor	Albanese	Assistant Minister to the Attorney-General	29 July 2024	13 May 2025	288 days

== Attorneys-general of the states and territories ==
The Australian states each have separate attorneys-general, who are state ministers with similar responsibilities to the federal minister with respect to state law. For attorneys-general of the various states and territories of Australia, see:

- Attorney-General of the Australian Capital Territory
- Attorney-General of New South Wales
- Attorney-General of the Northern Territory
- Attorney-General of Queensland
- Attorney-General of South Australia
- Attorney-General of Tasmania
- Attorney-General of Victoria
- Attorney-General of Western Australia

== See also ==
- Attorney general
- Justice ministry
