= Division of Dickson =

Australian federal electoral division

Coordinates: 27.271°S 152.847°E

Dickson Australian House of Representatives Division
- Interactive map of boundaries since the 2019 federal election
- Created: 1992
- MP: Ali France
- Party: Labor
- Namesake: Sir James Dickson
- Electors: 119,401 (2025)
- Area: 724 km^{2} (279.5 sq mi)
- Demographic: Outer metropolitan
Electorates around Dickson:
Blair	Longman	Longman
Blair	Dickson	Petrie
Ryan	Ryan	Lilley

The Division of Dickson is an Australian electoral division in Queensland. The incumbent MP is Ali France. A member of the Labor Party, she defeated incumbent MP and Liberal Party Leader Peter Dutton in the 2025 federal election.

Dickson includes the suburbs of Kurwongbah, Petrie, Strathpine, Bunya, Arana Hills, Albany Creek, Eatons Hill, Samford, Samford Valley, Dayboro, McDowall, Ferny Hills, Everton Hills and Murrumba Downs. The electorate also includes Lake Samsonvale and Lake Kurwongbah and covers 724 square kilometres.

== History ==
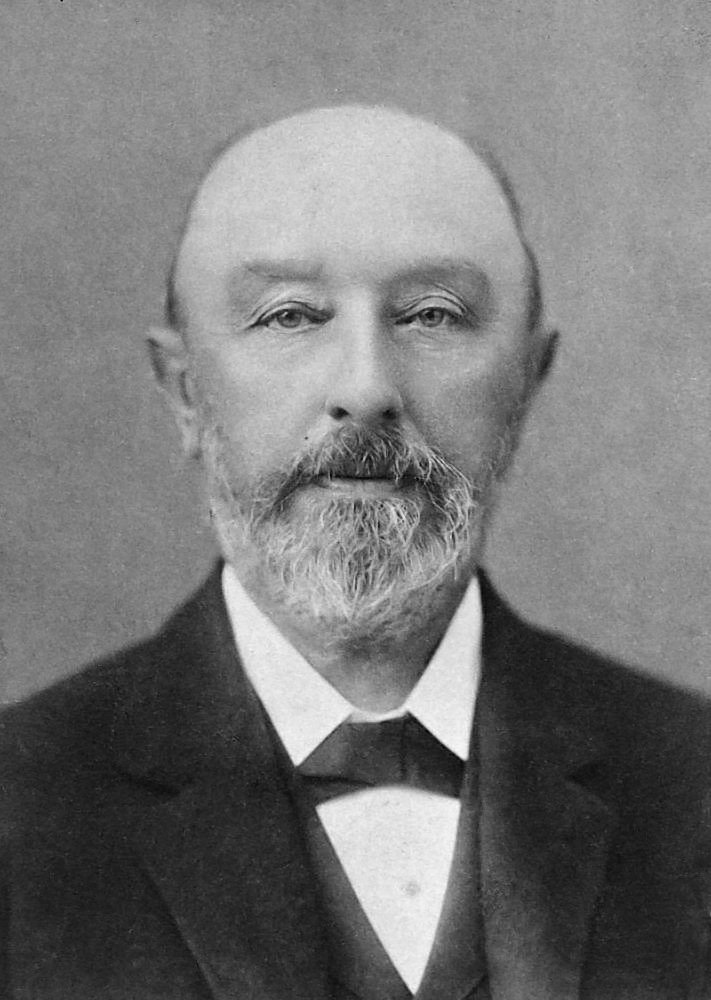
Sir James Dickson, the division's namesake

The division was formed in 1992 and is named after Sir James Dickson, a leading advocate in Australian Federation, Premier of Queensland and Minister for Defence in the first Australian ministry.

=== 1993 election ===
There was an unusual circumstance at the 1993 election. The seat had been carved out of most of the Brisbane portion of the Sunshine Coast-based seat of Fisher, making it a natural choice for that seat's Labor MP, Michael Lavarch, to transfer ahead of the 1993 election.

However, one of the candidates, an independent, died very shortly before the election, making it necessary to hold a standalone supplementary election on 17 April (the rest of the country had already voted on 13 March). Following Labor's reelection, the Prime Minister Paul Keating announced the makeup of the Second Keating ministry to be sworn in on 24 March, but kept the portfolio of Attorney-General open for Lavarch subject to him winning Dickson on 17 April. He won the seat, and was appointed to the ministry on 27 April.

=== 2025 election ===
Peter Dutton lost the seat at the 2025 federal election to Labor's Ali France, who previously contested the seat at the 2019 and 2022 elections. Dutton lost over seven percent of his primary vote from 2022, and was defeated on a swing of 7.7 percent after all preferences were distributed. France defeated Dutton after over 76% of preferences from independent candidate Ellie Smith flowed to her. He is the first federal major party leader to lose his own seat since John Howard lost his electorate of Bennelong at the 2007 federal election, and the first sitting opposition leader since Federation to lose his own seat in parliament.

== Boundaries ==
Since 1984, federal electoral division boundaries in Australia have been determined at redistributions by a redistribution committee appointed by the Australian Electoral Commission. Redistributions occur for the boundaries of divisions in a particular state, and they occur every seven years, or sooner if a state's representation entitlement changes or when divisions of a state are malapportioned.

The division is located in the outer north-western suburbs of Brisbane. The 2006 redistribution added the Shire of Esk to and removed part of Kallangur from the seat. It has historically been a marginal seat, changing hands between the Australian Labor Party and the Liberal Party.

== Members ==
Image	Member	Party	Term	Notes
	Michael Lavarch (1961–)	Labor	17 April 1993 – 2 March 1996	Previously held the Division of Fisher. Served as minister under Paul Keating. Lost seat
	Tony Smith (1950–)	Liberal	2 March 1996 – 26 May 1998	Lost seat
	Tony Smith (1950–)	Independent	26 May 1998 – 3 October 1998	Lost seat
	Cheryl Kernot (1948–)	Labor	3 October 1998 – 10 November 2001	Previously a member of the Senate. Lost seat
	Peter Dutton (1970–)	Liberal	10 November 2001 – 3 May 2025	Served as minister under Howard, Abbott, Turnbull and Morrison. Served as Opposition Leader from 2022 to 2025. Lost seat
	Ali France (1973–)	Labor	3 May 2025 – present	Incumbent

== Election results ==
2025 Australian federal election: Dickson
Party	Candidate	Votes	%	±%
Liberal National	Peter Dutton	36,628	34.69	−7.38
Labor	Ali France	35,502	33.63	+1.93
Independent	Ellie Smith	12,874	12.19	+12.19
Greens	Vinnie Batten	8,061	7.64	−5.36
One Nation	Joel Stevenson	4,429	4.19	−1.17
Legalise Cannabis	David Zaloudek	2,950	2.79	+2.79
Family First	Suniti Hewett	2,299	2.18	+2.18
Trumpet of Patriots	Michael Jessop	1,900	1.80	+1.80
Animal Justice	Maureen Brohman	936	0.89	+0.89
Total formal votes		105,579	95.76	−0.36
Informal votes		4,676	4.24	+0.36
Turnout		110,255	92.36	+1.01
Two-party-preferred result
Labor	Ali France	59,115	55.99	+7.69
Liberal National	Peter Dutton	46,464	44.01	−7.69
Labor gain from Liberal National		Swing	+7.69	
