= Melton West =

- Suburb
- Interactive map of Melton West
- Coordinates: 37.675°S 144.555°E
- Country: Australia
- State: Victoria
- City: Melbourne
- LGA: City of Melton
- Location: 38 km (24 mi) from Melbourne central business district

Government
  - State electorate: Melton
  - Federal division: Hawke

Population
  - Total: 8,784 (2021 census)
- Postcode: 3337
Suburbs around Melton West
Long Forest	Harkness	Kurunjang
Long Forest	Melton West	Melton
Hopetoun Park	Brookfield	Melton South

Melton West is a suburb in Victoria, Australia, 38 km (24 mi) west of Melbourne's Central Business District, in the City of Melton local government area. Melton West recorded a population of 8,784 at the 2021 census.

Melton West Post Office opened on 1 September 1994.

== Education ==
Melton West contains seven schools: Saint Francis Catholic College, St Catherine of Sienna Catholic Primary School, Wedge Park Primary School, Melton West Primary School, Melton Secondary College, Melton Specialist School and OneSchool Global Melton Campus.

== History ==
The initial urban development of Melton West's infrastructure began in the early 1970s, with Melton West Primary School opening in 1971. In 1973, Melton Regional Shopping Centre opened. The centre has since been renamed Woodgrove Shopping Centre and has expanded into a major shopping centre with over 150 stores, including Harris Scarfe, Big W, Kmart, Coles, Woolworths, Aldi and Reading Cinemas as anchor tenants.

Melton Secondary College opened in 1975, followed by Melton Specialist School in 1978, Catholic Regional College Melton (now St Francis Catholic College) in 1980 and Wedge Park Primary School in 1982.

== See also ==
- Melton Region
- Melton railway station
