= Greg Hunt =

Australian politician (born 1965)

The Honourable Greg Hunt
- Hunt in 2013

Minister for Health and Aged Care
- In office 22 December 2020 – 23 May 2022 Serving with Scott Morrison (2020–2022)
- Prime Minister: Scott Morrison
- Preceded by: Himself (as Minister for Health); Richard Colbeck (as Minister for Aged Care and Senior Australians)
- Succeeded by: Katy Gallagher (acting as Minister for Health); Mark Butler (as Minister for Health); Anika Wells (as Minister for Aged Care)

Minister for Health
- In office 24 January 2017 – 22 December 2020 Serving with Scott Morrison (2020)
- Prime Minister: Malcolm Turnbull; Scott Morrison
- Preceded by: Sussan Ley (as Minister for Health and Ageing); Arthur Sinodinos (acting as Minister for Health and Ageing)
- Succeeded by: Himself (as Minister for Health and Aged Care)

Minister for Sport
- In office 24 January 2017 – 20 December 2017
- Prime Minister: Malcolm Turnbull
- Preceded by: Sussan Ley
- Succeeded by: Bridget McKenzie

Minister for Industry, Innovation and Science
- In office 19 July 2016 – 24 January 2017
- Prime Minister: Malcolm Turnbull
- Preceded by: Christopher Pyne
- Succeeded by: Arthur Sinodinos

Minister for the Environment
- In office 18 September 2013 – 19 July 2016
- Prime Minister: Tony Abbott; Malcolm Turnbull
- Preceded by: Mark Butler
- Succeeded by: Josh Frydenberg

Member of the Australian Parliament for Flinders
- In office 10 November 2001 – 11 April 2022
- Preceded by: Peter Reith
- Succeeded by: Zoe McKenzie
- Majority: 5.6%

Personal details
- Born: Gregory Andrew Hunt; 18 November 1965 (age 60) Melbourne, Victoria, Australia
- Party: Liberal
- Spouse: Paula Lindsey
- Relations: Alan Hunt (father)
- Children: 2
- Education: University of Melbourne; Yale University
- Website: Official website

Gregory Andrew Hunt (born 18 November 1965) is an Australian former politician who was the Minister for Health between January 2017 and May 2022. He was a Liberal Party member of the House of Representatives between November 2001 and 2022, representing the Division of Flinders in Victoria. He previously served as a parliamentary secretary in the Howard government (2004–2007), Minister for the Environment (2013–2016), Minister for Industry, Innovation and Science (2016–2017), and Minister for Sport (2017).

From March 2020 until his retirement in May 2022, Hunt had oversight over the Australian government's response to the COVID-19 pandemic.

Following his parliamentary career, Hunt has held academic and advisory appointments, including as an Honorary Professor of Practice at University College London's Global Business School for Health, as an Honorary Enterprise Professor at the University of Melbourne and as Chair of the Advisory Council of the Turner Institute for Brain and Mental Health at Monash University in addition to non-executive director and corporate advisory roles.

== Early life ==
Gregory Andrew Hunt was born on 18 November 1965 in Frankston, Victoria. He was born to Kathinka (née Grant, known as Tinka) and Alan Hunt. He had four older half brothers from his father's first marriage. His father was a solicitor by profession who had been elected to the Victorian Legislative Council in 1962, and served as a Liberal state government minister in the 1970s and 1980s. Hunt's maternal grandmother Phyllis Forster was one of the first women to graduate from the Victorian College of Pharmacy. His mother worked as a nurse, but suffered from a form of bipolar disorder and was later temporarily institutionalised. She died of a heart attack at the age of 58, while her son was studying abroad.

Hunt grew up in Mornington, Victoria, attending Mornington Primary School and the Peninsula School. He took a gap year after leaving high school, travelling through Ireland, the Alps, Spain, and Israel. He lived on a kibbutz for several months, learning Hebrew and working in a machine shop. After returning to Australia, Hunt studied arts and law at the University of Melbourne, living at Ormond College and graduating with first-class honours in law and upper second-class honours in arts. At university he developed friendships with Mary Wooldridge and John Roskam. He was head of the debating society and partnered with Rufus Black at the 1989 World Universities Debating Championship in Edinburgh, Scotland, finishing in second place. He won a prize for a final-year thesis he co-authored with Black, titled A Tax to Make the Polluter Pay.

== Career ==
Hunt joined law firm Mallesons Stephen Jaques after completing his undergraduate degree. In 1992 he was an associate to Michael Black, the chief justice of the Federal Court of Australia. Hunt subsequently completed a Master of Arts in International Relations at Yale University as a Fulbright Scholar. He also interned at the UN Centre for Human Rights in Geneva, "researching atrocities in the former Yugoslavia".

In 1994, Hunt began working as a senior adviser to Alexander Downer, the federal Leader of the Opposition. He remained in Downer's office until 1998, spanning his resignation as Liberal leader and later appointment as foreign minister in the Howard government. He was the chief of the Australian Electoral Observer Mission at the 1998 Cambodian general election. Hunt subsequently worked as a senior fellow at the University of Melbourne's Centre for Comparative Constitutional Law (1998–1999), as engagement manager at management consultants McKinsey and Co. (1999–2001), and held the position of Director of Strategy at the World Economic Forum (2000–2001).

== Politics ==
=== Early career ===
Hunt was elected to the House of Representatives at the 2001 federal election, standing in the Division of Flinders. He had been asked to stand for Liberal preselection by the retiring MP Peter Reith. In 2003 he supported the invasion of Iraq and the action to oust Saddam Hussein on the basis of humanitarian relief and served as a spokesman for the Howard government's policies.

Hunt was first elevated to the ministry following the 2004 federal election, when he was appointed Parliamentary Secretary to the Minister for the Environment and Heritage. In January 2007, Hunt was appointed Parliamentary Secretary to the Minister for Foreign Affairs. Following the Coalition's defeat at the 2007 election, he was appointed Shadow Minister for Climate Change, Environment and Urban Water. His title was altered to Shadow Minister for Climate Change, Environment and Heritage after the 2010 election.

=== Abbott government (2013–2015) ===
After the 2013 federal election, Hunt was appointed Minister for the Environment in the Abbott government. One of his first actions as minister was to inform Tim Flannery, the head of the Gillard government's Climate Commission, that the government was closing this body, as per its election platform. In December 2013, he announced a project to dredge Abbot Point, which was approved by the Marine Park Authority in January 2014.

During his tenure as Minister for the Environment, Hunt oversaw a range of water management and reef protection initiatives. In 2015, the government released the Reef 2050 Long-Term Sustainability Plan, a comprehensive framework developed in response to concerns raised by UNESCO regarding the Great Barrier Reef's World Heritage status. The plan was accompanied by the expansion of the Reef Trust, a funding mechanism for reef protection and water quality improvement projects. Later that year, Hunt announced a permanent ban on the disposal of capital dredge spoil within the Great Barrier Reef Marine Park.

Hunt also played a role in water reform relating to the Murray–Darling Basin Plan. In September 2015, legislation to cap water buybacks under the Basin Plan passed the Senate, marking a significant milestone in the implementation of the Murray–Darling Basin framework.

Internationally, Hunt represented Australia in negotiations under the Montreal Protocol and was involved in advancing the "Dubai Pathway", under which participating countries agreed to begin work on reducing hydrofluorocarbon emissions, a class of potent greenhouse gases.

In the area of land and species protection, Hunt established the role of Australia's first Threatened Species Commissioner to coordinate national conservation efforts and prioritise recovery actions for at-risk flora and fauna. He also renewed the National Environmental Science Program, providing funding for research to support evidence-based environmental decision-making.

=== Turnbull government (2015–2018) ===
Following the change in Liberal Party leadership in September 2015, Hunt was retained as Minister for the Environment in the new Turnbull government. In February 2016, Hunt was named "Best Minister in the World" by a panel established by Thomson Reuters for the 2016 World Government Summit of Dubai.

With the reelection of the Turnbull government in 2016, Hunt became the Minister for Industry, Innovation and Science in the Second Turnbull Ministry. Hunt was involved in the lead-up to the establishment of the Australian Space Agency, which commenced operations on 1 July 2018. Following the resignation of Sussan Ley as Health Minister in January 2017, Turnbull appointed Hunt as the Minister for Health and the Minister for Sport.

In June 2017 Hunt, Michael Sukkar and Alan Tudge faced the possibility of being prosecuted for contempt of court after they made public statements criticising the sentencing decisions of two senior judges while the government was awaiting their ruling on a related appeal. They avoided prosecution by, eventually, making an unconditional apology to the Victorian Court of Appeal. During the run up to the Victorian state elections of 2018, Hunt participated in the African gangs crime debate by stating "We know that African gang crime in some areas [of Victoria] is clearly out of control. [...] The failure is not police, but the Premier."

In December 2017, Hunt's official Twitter account was seen to like a pornographic account's post, which became publicly visible. He denied having liked the post and instead claimed that he was hacked and called on the Australian Federal Police (AFP) to investigate. The AFP announced in May 2018, that after investigations, hackers were not the cause of the incident.

=== Morrison government (2018–2022) ===
During the Liberal leadership crisis in August 2018, Hunt tendered his resignation as health minister. However, it was not formally accepted and he retained the position in the Morrison government several days later. Hunt stood for the deputy leadership of the party, polling 16 votes out of 82 (20 percent) compared with 46 for Josh Frydenberg and 20 for Steven Ciobo; there were three abstentions.

After being appointed Minister for Health, Hunt oversaw reforms across primary care, pharmaceuticals, hospitals, mental health, medical research, digital health and the national response to the COVID-19 pandemic. In the first six months of his term, the government reached agreements with major health sector organisations including the Australian Medical Association, the Royal Australian College of General Practitioners, The Pharmacy Guild of Australia and Medicines Australia, aimed at stabilising funding arrangements and strengthening cooperation across the health system.

In 2020, he negotiated major national agreements with the states and territories to support hospital funding and capacity during the COVID-19 pandemic, alongside the negotiation of a new Community Pharmacy Agreement to maintain access to medicines and pharmacy services.

During his term as Minister for Health, Hunt oversaw the establishment and expansion of the government's Head to Health network of multidisciplinary mental health treatment centres, including funding for adult, youth and children's Head to Health clinics as part of a national reform package to improve community-based mental health services. In 2021, the government released a long-term National Mental Health and Suicide Prevention Plan, supported by approximately A$2.3 billion in funding, with an emphasis on early intervention, suicide prevention and community-based care.

The Medical Research Future Fund continued as a central mechanism for long-term investment in Australian medical research during Hunt's tenure. Funding from the Medical Research Future Fund supported research missions including the Million Minds Mental Health Research Mission, which aims to help a million Australians access new mental health research and interventions, as well as strategic research into genomics and stem cell therapies under broader MRFF research mission frameworks. The first and second ten-year MRFF investment plans were released during this period, structured around four strategic pillars and involving investment commitments totalling approximately A$6 billion.

Hunt had a prominent role during the COVID-19 pandemic in Australia. He was granted authority over Australia's strategy and response to the pandemic after Governor-General David Hurley enacted the Biosecurity Act 2015 on 23 March 2020. Hunt's leadership over Australia's public health response to the pandemic has received praise for its effectiveness in reducing transmission and following scientific advice. In government meetings, Hunt drew comparison's with Australia's shortcomings in responding to the 1918 flu pandemic to garner political support for the "suppression" strategy. Hunt also conducted national press briefings and has been prominent in the country's vaccination deployment. Hunt's ban on foreign travel for Australians during the pandemic has faced legal challenges but was upheld in court. His handling of the country's vaccination program has drawn some criticism for delays and examples of mis-management, particularly in the aged care sector. However, Australia's COVID-19 vaccination program reached approximately 90 per cent double-dose coverage by October 2021, achieving this milestone earlier than initially anticipated. By late 2021, Australia had one of the highest COVID-19 vaccination rates in the world.

Under Hunt's leadership, telehealth services were rapidly expanded and subsequently made permanent within Medicare. Between 13 March 2020 and 16 March 2022, more than 100 million telehealth services were delivered to around 17 million Australians, with over $5 billion in Medicare benefits paid and more than 92,000 health practitioners using telehealth items. The government also pursued reforms to strengthen digital health infrastructure, including enhancements to My Health Record.

In June 2020 Hunt announced that he would ask the Governor-General in Council to make regulations from 1 July 2020 prohibiting the importation of e-cigarettes containing vaporizer nicotine and nicotine-containing refills unless on prescription from a doctor. Hunt stated on Twitter that the Australian Government committed to shutting down the importation of vaping products on 1 July. This became one of the world's first prescription vaping models. By 27 July a petition endorsed by Senator Matthew Canavan and George Christensen and other backbenchers was signed by over 70,000 people, causing Hunt to extend this deadline. Hunt stated in a media release that he will now ask the Governor-General in Council to sign off on these regulations on 1 January 2021 to allow time for a more streamlined process for patients obtaining nicotine through their GP.

On 2 December 2021, Hunt announced his intention to retire from politics in the 2022 federal election. Former Prime Minister Scott Morrison publicly paid tribute to Hunt upon his retirement, describing him as "an incredibly great member of my team" with "a big brain and a big heart", reflecting broad cross-bench appreciation for his long service and leadership of the pandemic response.

== Political positions ==
Hunt was described in 2017 as a "'small-l liberal' from the party's progressive wing". In 2012 he was described as "a moderate who is part of Tony Abbott's inner circle, and arguably the pre-eminent federal Liberal from Victoria". However, according to The Sydney Morning Herald in 2021, Hunt is a member of the centre-right faction of the Liberal Party.

Hunt voted for removing the ban on the abortion drug RU-486 and supported the legalisation of same-sex marriage.

In 2006 Hunt and three other Liberal MPs put forward a proposal to fund full-time chaplains in state schools, in what eventually became the National School Chaplaincy Programme. He reportedly described state schools as "anti-religious" and said there was "a clear need in our schools for the mentoring and personal development, counselling and crisis management, the opportunity for values-based guidance and religious education that a chaplain could provide".

== Post political life ==
Following his retirement from federal politics in 2022, Hunt has undertaken a variety of academic, advisory and private sector roles. He was appointed an Honorary Melbourne Enterprise Professor at the University of Melbourne, where he provides strategic advice on health policy, innovation and leadership across faculties including medicine and economics. Hunt also serves as a Senior Advisor with global professional services firm Alvarez and Marsal in their Government, Health & Human Services practice following his ministerial career. In addition, he joined the board of biotechnology company HaemaLogiX Ltd as a non-executive director from 2024-2025, contributing his experience in health systems and innovation to the company's development of novel therapies.

In October 2022, Monash University announced the appointment of Hunt as the foundation Chair of the Turner Institute for Brain and Mental Health's Advisory Council.

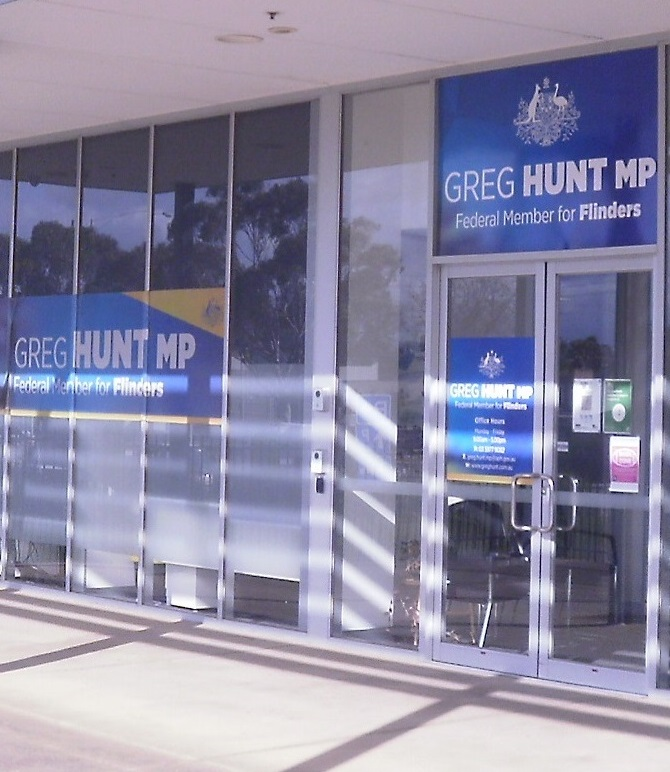
Greg Hunt's electoral office in Somerville

== Personal life ==
Hunt lives in Mount Martha, Victoria. He has two children from his marriage to Paula Lindsey, a former nurse educator. His first marriage "to a university sweetheart, ended amicably during his 20s".

Hunt is a qualified recreational diver. He had completed seven marathons as of 2012, and in 2020, it was reported that he runs 6 kilometres (3.7 mi) a day. In March 2021, he was hospitalised for several days with cellulitis.

Parliament of Australia
Preceded by Peter Reith	Member for Flinders; 2001–2022	Succeeded by Zoe McKenzie
Political offices
Preceded by Sharman Stone	Parliamentary Secretary to the Minister for the Environment and Heritage; 2004–2007	Succeeded by John Cobb as Assistant Minister for the Environment and Heritage
Preceded by Teresa Gambaro	Parliamentary Secretary for Minister for Foreign Affairs; 2007	Succeeded by Bob McMullan as Parliamentary Secretary for International Development Assistance
Preceded by Mark Butler as Minister for the Environment, Heritage and Water	Minister for the Environment; 2013–2016	Succeeded by Josh Frydenberg as Minister for the Environment and Energy
Preceded by Christopher Pyne	Minister for Industry, Innovation and Science; 2016–2017	Succeeded by Arthur Sinodinos
Preceded by Sussan Ley	Minister for Sport; 2017	Succeeded by Bridget McKenzie as Minister for Regional Services, Sport, Local Government and Decentralisation
Preceded by Sussan Ley	Minister for Health; 2017–2022	Succeeded by Mark Butler
Preceded by Mathias Cormann as Minister for Finance and the Public Service	Minister Assisting the Prime Minister for the Public Service and Cabinet; 2019–2020	Succeeded by Scott Morrison as Minister for the Public Service
Preceded by Richard Colbeck as Minister for Aged Care and Senior Australians	Minister for Aged Care; 2020–2022	Succeeded by Mark Butler
Preceded by Richard Colbeck as Minister for Aged Care and Senior Australians	Minister for Aged Care; 2020–2022	Succeeded by Anika Wells
