= Toolern Vale =

- Town
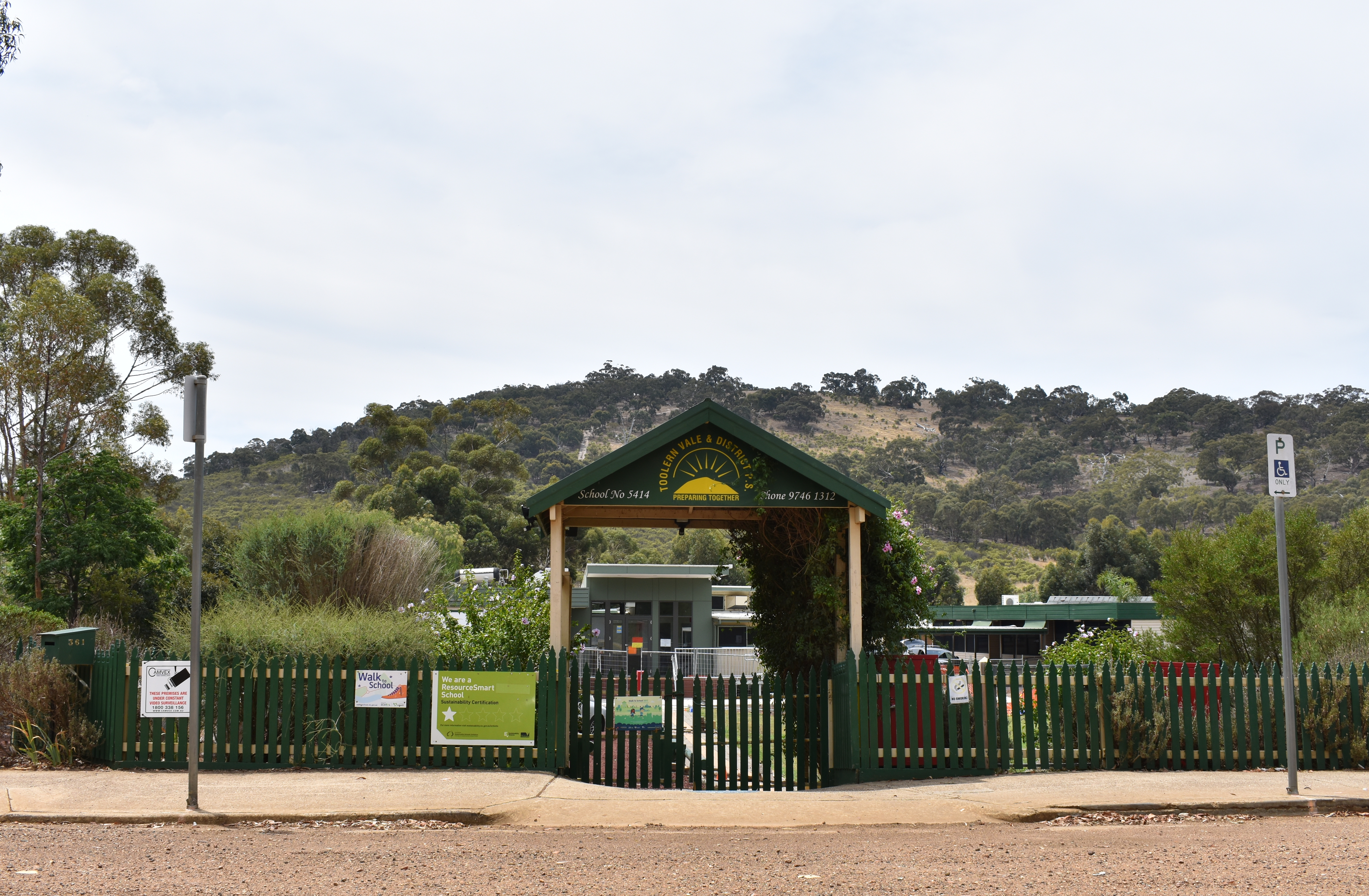
- The state primary school at Toolern Vale, 2018

- Interactive map of Toolern Vale
- Coordinates: 37°36′29″S 144°35′35″E
- Country: Australia
- State: Victoria
- LGAs: City of Melton; Shire of Macedon Ranges
- Location: 40 km (25 mi) NW of Melbourne; 10 km (6.2 mi) N of Melton

Government
  - State electorate: Macedon
  - Federal division: Hawke

Population
  - Total: 818 (2021 census)
- Postcode: 3337
Localities around Toolern Vale
Gisborne	Gisborne, Gisborne South	Gisborne South
Coimadai	Toolern Vale	Diggers Rest
Long Forest, Harkness	Kurunjang	Plumpton, Melton

Toolern Vale is a town on the north-western outskirts of Greater Melbourne in Victoria, Australia, 40 km (25 mi) north-west of Melbourne's Central Business District, located within the City of Melton and the Shire of Macedon Ranges local government areas. Toolern Vale recorded a population of 818 at the 2021 census. Toolern Vale is located along Toolern Creek, which flows south before joining the Werribee River.

Toolern Vale contains a primary school, a CFA fire station, a war memorial and reserve with tennis courts, as well as a community hall often used for antique and collectables auctions.

Toolern Vale is renowned for the numerous horse studs, stables and training facilities which abound. Because of this, the area is often referred to as "Thoroughbred Country". VicRoads has issued special, gold and brown "Thoroughbred Country" licence plates which are often seen being spotted on vehicles from Toolern Vale.

The Post Office opened on 1 January 1871 and was known as Toolern until 1904.

== Melton Airfield ==
Melton Airfield is a small grass strip airfield located at the intersection of Coburns Road and Diggers Rest - Coimadai Road.

== Gallery ==
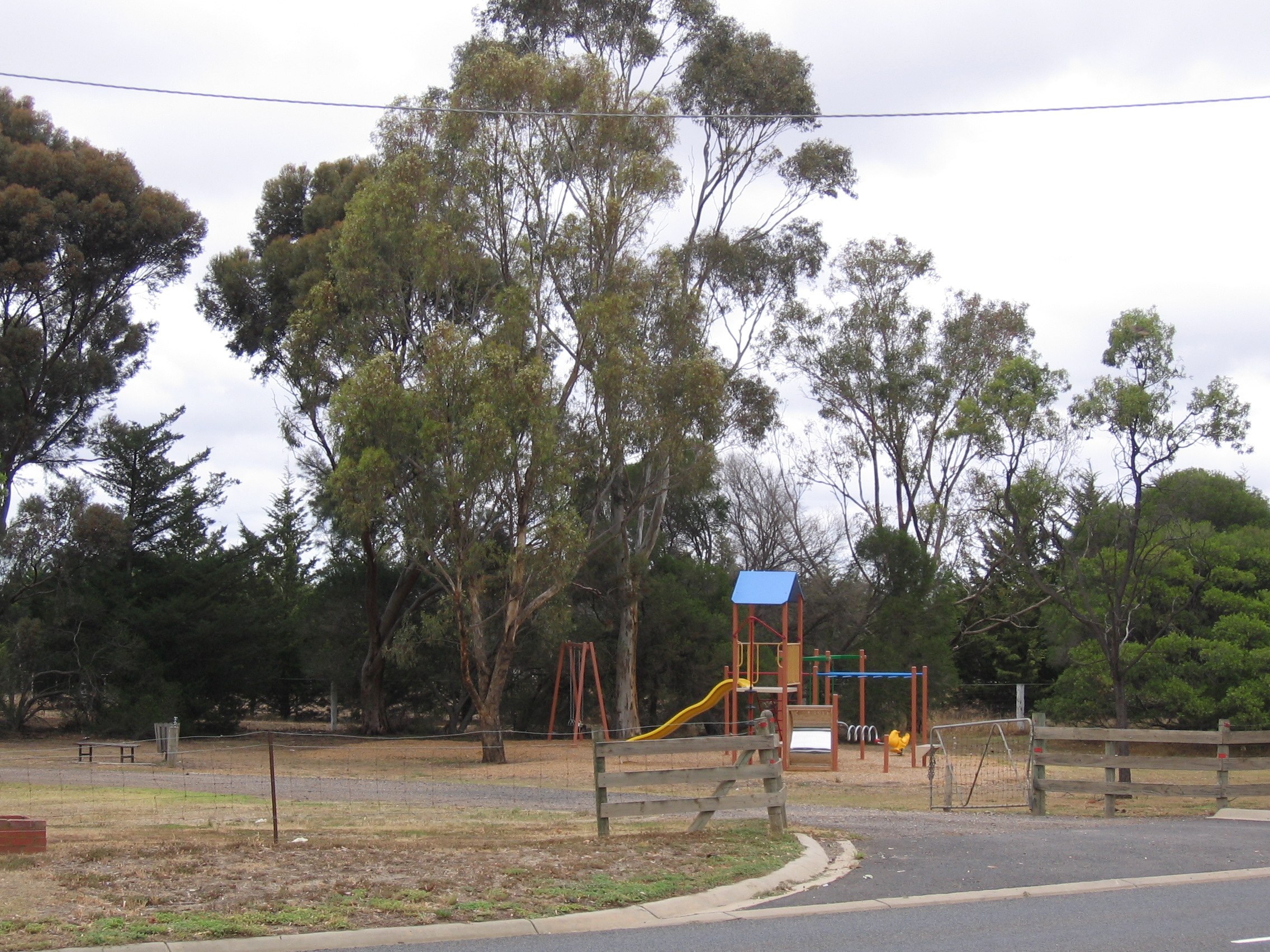
Park and playground

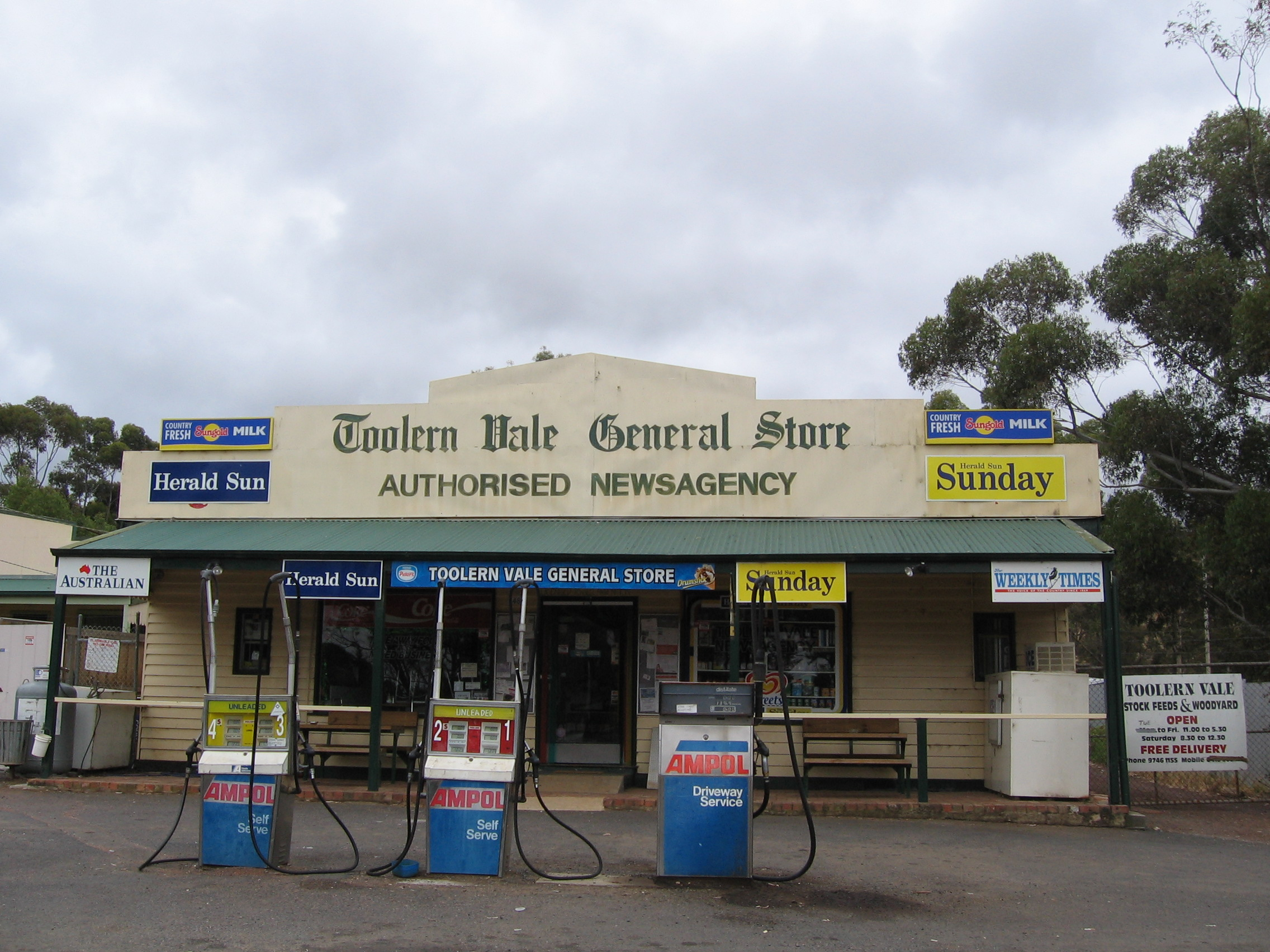
The Toolern Vale General Store

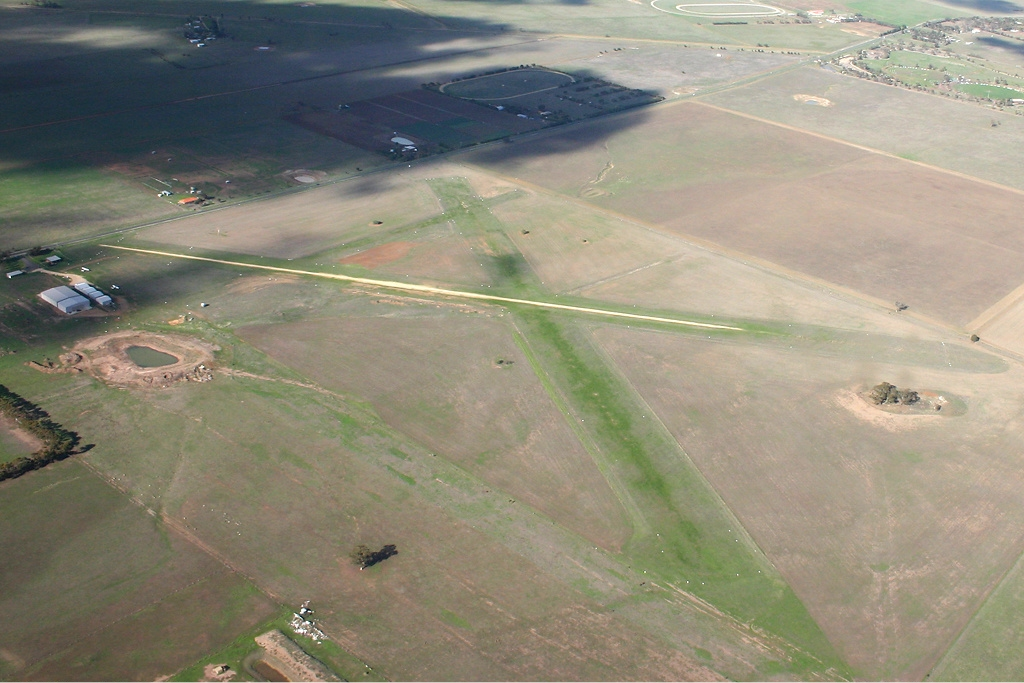
Melton Airfield
