= Electoral results for the Division of Hawke =

Australian division election results

This is a list of electoral results for the Division of Hawke in Australian federal elections from the division's creation in 2022 until the present.

== Members ==
| Member | Party | Term |
|---|---|---|
| Sam Rae | Labor | 2022–present |

== Election results ==
=== Elections in the 2020s ===
==== 2025 ====
2025 Australian federal election: Hawke
| Party | Candidate | Votes | % | ±% |
|---|---|---|---|---|
| Family First | Melanie Milutinovic | | | |
| Legalise Cannabis | Devon Starbuck | | | |
| Greens | Sarah Newman | | | |
| Animal Justice | Fiona Adin-James | | | |
| Labor | Sam Rae | | | |
| Liberal | Simmone Cottom | | | |
| One Nation | Matthew Katselis | | | |
| Total formal votes | | | | |
| Informal votes | | | | |
| Turnout | | | | |

==== 2022 ====
2022 Australian federal election: Hawke
| Party | Candidate | Votes | % | ±% |
|---|---|---|---|---|
| Labor | Sam Rae | 32,020 | 36.73 | −7.44 |
| Liberal | Enamul Haque | 22,960 | 26.34 | −3.01 |
| Greens | Lynda Wheelock | 7,785 | 8.93 | +1.56 |
| Independent | Jarrod Bingham | 6,908 | 7.92 | +1.50 |
| United Australia | Andrew Cuthbertson | 6,131 | 7.03 | +0.71 |
| One Nation | Nick Suduk | 4,872 | 5.59 | +3.88 |
| Federation | Michael Williams | 1,926 | 2.21 | +2.21 |
| Great Australian | Michael Lacey | 1,827 | 2.10 | +2.10 |
| TNL | Max Martucci | 1,432 | 1.64 | +1.64 |
| Victorian Socialists | Jack Hynes | 889 | 1.02 | +1.02 |
| Citizens | Glenn Vessey | 434 | 0.50 | +0.50 |
| Total formal votes | | 87,184 | 91.85 | −2.61 |
| Informal votes | | 7,735 | 8.15 | +2.61 |
| Turnout | | 94,919 | 89.14 | −0.81 |
Two-party-preferred result
| Labor | Sam Rae | 50,241 | 57.63 | −2.59 |
| Liberal | Enamul Haque | 36,943 | 42.37 | +2.59 |
| Labor hold | | Swing | −2.59 | |

Alluvial diagram for preference flows in the seat of Hawke in the 2022 federal election. indicates at what stage the winning candidate had over 50% of the votes and was declared the winner.
