= Harkness, Victoria =

Harkness
- Suburb
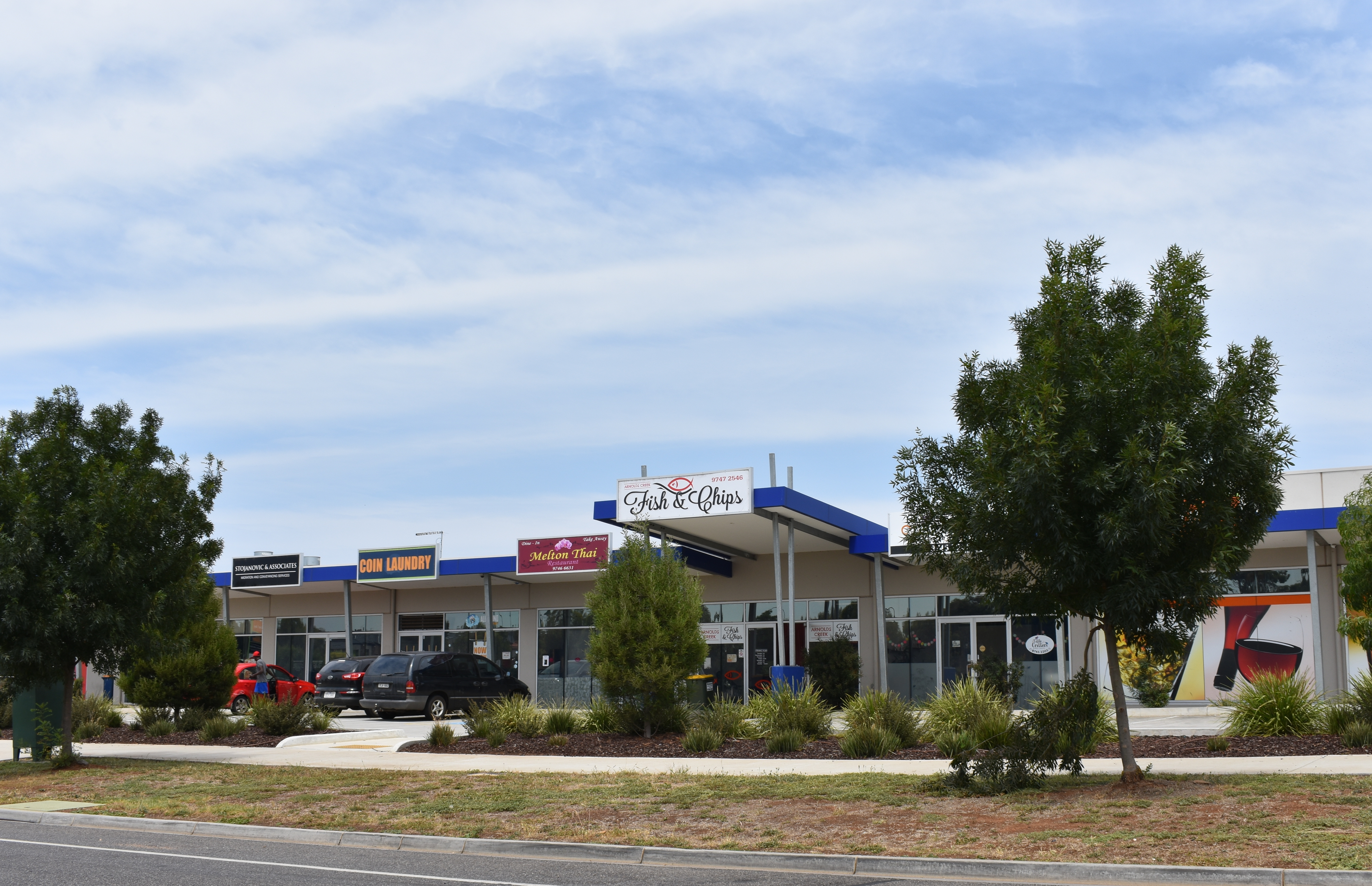
- Shops in Harkness, 2018

- Interactive map of Harkness
- Coordinates: 37°39′15″S 144°32′45″E
- Country: Australia
- State: Victoria
- LGA: City of Melton
- Location: 38 km (24 mi) W of Melbourne CBD
- Established: 2017

Government
  - State electorate: Melton
  - Federal division: Hawke

Population
  - Total: 12,463 (2021 census)
- Postcode: 3337
Suburbs around Harkness
Coimadai	Toolern Vale	Toolern Vale
Long Forest	Harkness	Kurunjang
Long Forest	Melton West	Melton

Harkness is a suburb in Victoria, Australia, 38 km (24 mi) North west of Melbourne's Central Business District, located within the City of Melton local government area. Harkness recorded a population of 12,463 at the 2021 census.

The suburb was gazetted by the Office of Geographic Names on 9 February 2017, following a proposal for eleven new suburbs by the City of Melton. The new name officially took effect from 23 August 2017.

Prior to the suburb's creation, the area was mostly part of Melton West, in addition to a small section of Toolern Vale in the north.

The name "Harkness" was the surname of an early settler, William Scott Harkness, who was born in Roxburghshire, Scotland in 1839 and arrived in Melbourne at Port Phillip in 1852. He was the manager of Strathtulloh and a farmer. He died in 1908.

== Education ==
Arnolds Creek Primary School is located in Harkness. The school opened in 2014. Located next to the primary school is Arnolds Creek Kindergarten.

The suburb is home to many early learning centres, including Melton Early Learning Centre, located just off Coburns Road, as well as Melton Montessori, located adjacent to Arnolds Creek Primary School, and Happy Feet Learning Centre, located on the corner of Centenary Boulevard and Bulmans Road.

== Recreation ==
Harkness is home to a number of open spaces and recreational facilities. Behind Arnolds Creek Primary School is Arnolds Creek Reserve, which is home to the Melton Central Football Club. Adjacent to the school is a playground and some basketball and tennis courts. Nearby is a shared-use path that runs alongside the western branch of Arnolds Creek.

Further to the east of the suburb, bordering on Coburns Road and Melton East, is Navan Park and Navan Park Lake, feed by Arnolds Creek, which has an off-leash area for dogs, electric undercover BBQs, exercise equipment, a playground and toilet facilities. There is also a shared-use path that runs alongside the eastern branch of Arnolds Creek and around the lake, which is popular with joggers and family cyclists.

In the north west of the suburb, there are many open spaces and parks, including Stefan Drive Reserve, Parkview Street Reserve and Willandra Boulevard Park and a basketball court.
