= Kurunjang Secondary College =

Location
- Kurunjang Drive, Kurunjang; Kurunjang, Victoria, Victoria, 3337; Australia; 37°40′21″S 144°35′06″E

Information
- Type: Secondary, secular
- Motto: Learn, Grow, Achieve Together
- Established: 1983, built 1986
- Principal: Aylin Gökmen
- Years offered: 7–12
- Enrolment: 833 (2019)
- Houses: Currently in update
- Colours: Sky blue, navy blue, maroon
- Communities served: City of Melton
- Website: www.kurunjangsc.vic.edu.au

Kurunjang Secondary College is a co-educational secondary school built in 1986, in Kurunjang, Victoria, Australia.

The principal of the school is supported by three assistant principals. Aylin Gökmen was appointed as Principal in October 2023; assistant principals appointed are Melanie Hayward, Christopher Ronalds and Kelsey Ryan.

The school's community partners include Kurunjang Primary, Melton Primary, Wedge Park Primary, Melton West Primary and many other schools. The school also neighbours the Melton campus of Heathdale Christian College.

== Curricular programmes ==
=== VCE ===
The Victorian Certificate of Education (VCE) is generally completed over a two-year period, but may be completed over an extended period. Students may select from over 30 studies or subjects. Each study is made up of at least four semester or half-year length units of study. Unit 1 and 2 are usually taken in year 11. Units 3 and 4 are usually taken in year 12. Units 1 and 2 may be taken separately but units 3 & 4 must be taken together as a sequence. Students can begin most studies at level 2 or 3 without having studied the previous unit. Over the two VCE years, most students will undertake 22 to 24 semester-length units.

=== VCAL ===
Victorian Certificate of Applied Learning (VCAL) is a Senior School qualification that is based on Applied Learning. It is a hands-on course that gets students ready for further training or employment. VCAL has three levels of certificate: Foundation, Intermediate and Senior. Senior is the highest level. Students would start at the level which matches their needs and your abilities. For example, if they complete Intermediate level in Year 11 they can move up to the Senior level in Year 12. Each level normally takes a year to complete.

=== VET ===
A VET in the VCE program enables students to earn a nationally recognised VET/TAFE Certificate in addition to a VCE Certificate. VET in the VCE links training to industry. Research has confirmed that a significant number of students are entering higher education or continuing with further training after successfully completing a VET in the VCE program.

=== AVID ===
AVID is a college readiness system for elementary through higher education.

Students in the AVID program use the "Cornell Notes" system of note-taking. Students take part in twice-monthly tutorials with Pre-service teachers from Victoria University.

The AVID classes frequently attend excursions, for example, in February 2014, AVID students (from all schools) went to Victoria University to listen to the famous adventurer, Troy Henkels.

=== Student voice ===
Student Voice organizes events including the Variety Concert and fund-raising events. The members of Student Voice include College Captains and Class Captains.

=== Instrumental music program ===
The instrumental music program allows students to learn a musical instrument. It is available to all 7–12 students, and woodwind and brass instruments may be taken home to practice.

== Alumni ==
- Tim Ward (Pro Skater)
- Matthew Leckie (Socceroo)
- Kyla Kirkpatrick (Champagne Dame)
- Ajak Deng(Model)
- James Sicily (AFL Footballer)

== See also ==
- List of schools in Victoria, Australia
- Victorian Certificate of Education

== News Articles ==
- Students Clean Up
- Melton students use music to spread the word against bullying
- Paralympian Ahmed Kelly inspires Kurunjang students
- Famous adventurer inspires AVID students

== Sources ==
- http://www.kurunjangsc.vic.edu.au
- https://www.abc.net.au/worldtoday/content/2012/s3519340.htm (published June 2012, retrieved 11 May 2014)
