= Stu Harvey =

Australian radio announcer

Stuart "Stu" Harvey is a Melbourne, Australia based radio announcer.

Harvey first worked at 979fm in Melton, Victoria, hosting Mondo Bizarro, before teaming up with Nick Kocsis (a.k.a. Nick Mondo) and moving the show to 3RRR. Mondo Bizarro was Australia's longest ever running specialist punk radio show, the show ended in late 2005, after running on various stations constantly for over 14 years. In 2004 he launched the punk/hardcore program on Triple J short.fast.loud and worked there for ten years.

== Writing career ==
Stu Harvey contributes weekly punk/hardcore news columns to a number of Australian print publications including Inpress (Melbourne), Drum Media (Sydney), Time Off (Brisbane), Drum Media Perth (Perth) and also a monthly column printed in nationally distributed secondary school magazine S-Press.
