= 979fm =

Radio station in Melton, Victoria

979fm (3RIM)

Melton, Victoria; Australia
- Broadcast area: Western Melbourne
- Frequency: 97.9 MHzFM

Programming
- Languages: English, others
- Format: Hit music, variety, ethnic.

Ownership
- Owner: 3RIM Incorporated
- Sister stations: The Eye (Melton Mowbray UK)

Technical information
- Licensing authority: ACMA
- ERP: 200 W
- Transmitter coordinates: 37°39′20″S 144°57′47″E

Links
- Public licence information: Profile
- Webcast: Online stream
- Website: 979fm.com.au

979fm (call sign: 3RIM) is a radio station based in the city of Melton, Victoria and is run by 3RIM Incorporated. The station's broadcast area covers the entire span of western and north western Melbourne, and has been known to stretch as far as Phillip Island in the Gippsland region, about 180 kilometres away from Melton.

The organisation was incorporated on 13 September 1985, making it one of the oldest community radio stations in Victoria.

The station is staffed and operated fully by volunteers from all age groups, backgrounds and ethnicities.

From 29 June 1991, to 1 July 2012 3RIM/979fm were based at Mowbray College's Patterson Campus. The College closed after going into voluntary administration in June 2012 leading to 979fm relocating. After broadcasting from a temporary location for 13 months the station began broadcasting from their new studios at Victoria University, Melton South on Tuesday 6 August 2013.

== Awards ==
During the 2008 Djerriwarrh Festival, 979fm was awarded the Most Entertaining Float in the annual Street Parade. They emulated this feat again in 2009 by winning the Community Involvement Award at the year's festival, the 30th in its history.

On Australia Day 2009, 979fm was awarded Community Group of the Year by the Melton Shire Australia Day Awards showing a commitment to the local Melton Shire community.

Also in 2009, 979fm's broadcast of the Ballarat Football League gained honours as Best Sporting Broadcast in the Southern Community Media Association's X Awards.

In 2010, 979FM garnered honours at the Powercor Melton Business Excellence Award being presented with "Best Community or Education Organisation and Best Access for All Abilities".

In 2011, 979fm garnered further honours at the Powercor Melton Business Excellence Awards, presented with Best Community Organisation.

== Notable alumni ==
- Stu Harvey hosted Mondo Bizzaro on 979fm and later on 3RRR. He now hosts Short Fast Loud on national youth broadcaster Triple J.
- Stephen Whittaker went on to become an afternoons announcer for 3BA in Ballarat.
- Vanessa O'Hanlon hosted Melbourne After Dark on Mix 101.1 in Melbourne and has also worked at the Seven Network, Network Ten and ABC. She now works for the Nine Network.
- Anthony Zanos hosts the Drive Show on 2RE in New South Wales
- Steve Austin, host of reggae program Zion Roots, DJed at Reggae clubs around Melbourne and also hosted a program on PBS 106.7FM in Melbourne.
- Radio's Very own Brad Wood, who co-hosted Sunday Evenings with Brad and The Apprentice and was with the station for 8 years, is now an announcer for B105 (4BBB) in Brisbane
- Michael Clough commentated for BFL Game Of The Round and co-hosted The Benchwarmers on 979fm. He is now play-by-play commentator for Foxtel's broadcasts of Melbourne Ice matches in the Australian Ice Hockey League.
- Matthew Cocks commentated for BFL Game Of The Round. He is now a commentator and presenter on Sports Entertainment Network
- Sam Young commentated for BFL Game Of The Round. He now commentates the BFL for 3BA
- Bassem Abousaid who co-hosted The Bazz And Dick Show and The Pro-Wrestling Show went on to be a weekend newsreader for Joy 94.9, and also a commentator and ring announcer for several professional wrestling companies in Melbourne.
