= Richard Colbeck =

Australian politician (born 1958)

Senator The Honourable Richard Colbeck
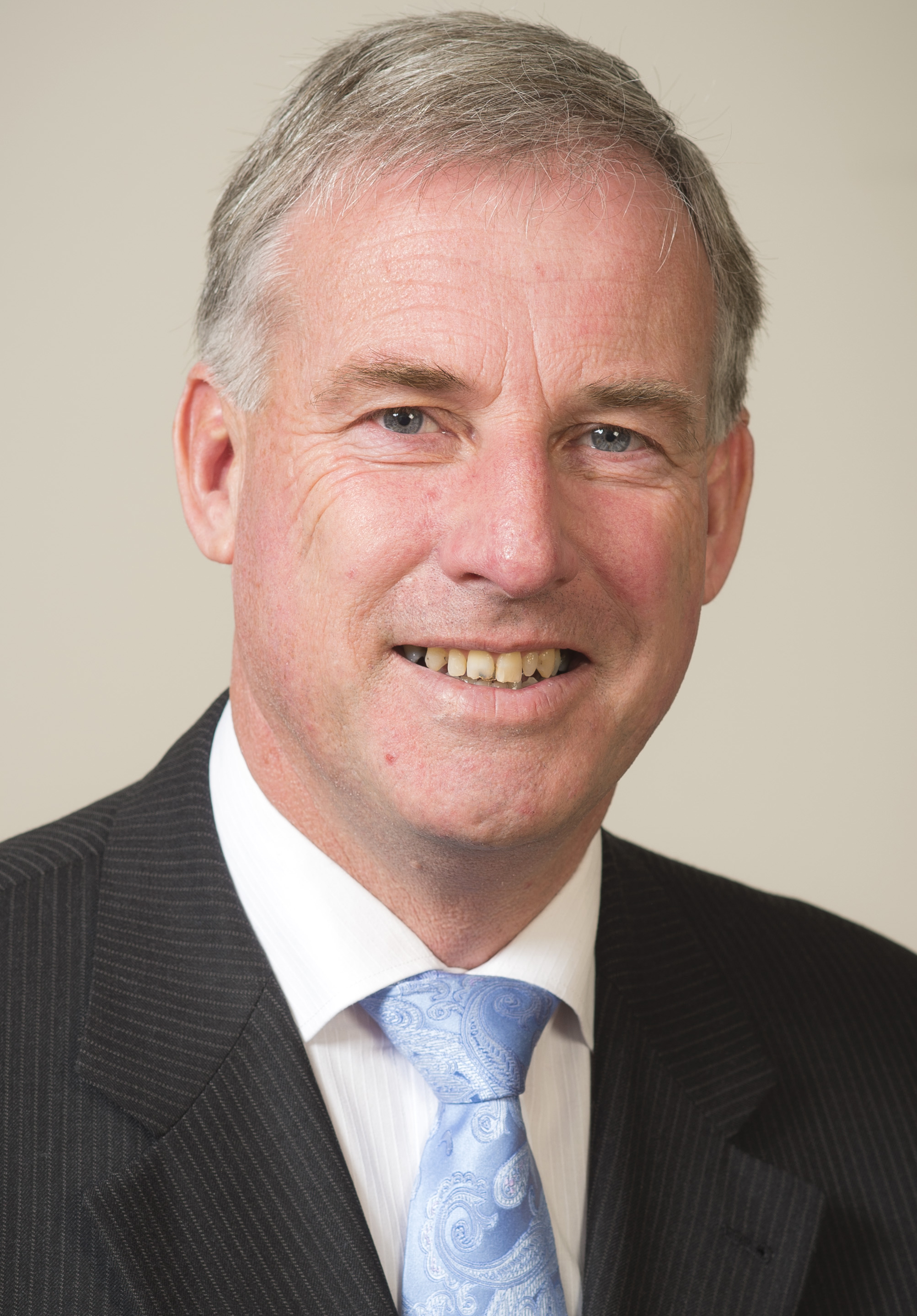
- Colbeck in 2014
Minister (2018-2022)
Minister for Sport
In office 22 December 2020 – 23 May 2022
Prime Minister	Scott Morrison
Preceded by	Himself (as Minister for Youth and Sport)
Succeeded by	Anika Wells
Minister for Senior Australians and Aged Care Services
In office 22 December 2020 – 23 May 2022
Prime Minister	Scott Morrison
Preceded by	Himself (as Minister for Aged Care and Senior Australians)
Succeeded by	Anika Wells
Minister for Youth and Sport
In office 26 May 2019 – 22 December 2020
Prime Minister	Scott Morrison
Preceded by	Bridget McKenzie
Succeeded by	Himself (as Minister for Sport)
Minister for Aged Care and Senior Australians
In office 26 May 2019 – 22 December 2020
Prime Minister	Scott Morrison
Preceded by	Ken Wyatt
Succeeded by	Greg Hunt (as Minister for Health and Aged Care); Himself (as Minister for Senior Australians and Aged Care Services)
Assistant Minister for Agriculture and Water Resources
In office 24 August 2018 – 29 May 2019
Preceded by	Anne Ruston
Succeeded by	Office abolished
Minister and Assistant Minister (2015-2016)
Minister for Tourism and International Education
In office 21 September 2015 – 19 July 2016
Prime Minister	Malcolm Turnbull
Preceded by	Gary Gray (as Minister for Tourism)
Succeeded by	Steven Ciobo (as Minister for Trade, Tourism and Investment)
Assistant Minister for Trade and Investment
In office 21 September 2015 – 19 July 2016
Prime Minister	Malcolm Turnbull
Preceded by	Office established
Succeeded by	Keith Pitt

Senator for Tasmania
- Incumbent
- Assumed office 9 February 2018
- Preceded by: Stephen Parry
- In office 4 February 2002 – 2 July 2016
- Preceded by: Jocelyn Newman
- Succeeded by: Jonathon Duniam

Personal details
- Born: Richard Mansell Colbeck; 5 April 1958 (age 68) Myrtleford, Victoria, Australia
- Party: Liberal Party of Australia
- Education: Devonport Technical College

Richard Mansell Colbeck (born 5 April 1958) is an Australian politician. He has been a Senator for Tasmania since 2018, representing the Liberal Party, and served a previous term in the Senate from 2002 to 2016. Colbeck served as the Minister for Senior Australians and Aged Care Services and Minister for Sport in the Second Morrison Ministry from December 2020 until May 2022, when the Albanese ministry was appointed. Previous to this, he was the Minister for Aged Care and Minister for Youth and Sport since May 2019.

Colbeck was first elected at the 2001 federal election, and was a parliamentary secretary in the Howard government. Colbeck served as the Minister Assisting the Minister for Trade and Investment and the Minister for Tourism and International Education in the Turnbull government from 2015 to 2016, but was defeated at the 2016 election. He returned to the Senate following a recount after Stephen Parry was disqualified during the parliamentary eligibility crisis.

Colbeck is a member of the Moderate/Modern Liberal faction of the Liberal Party.

== Early life ==
Colbeck was born in Myrtleford, Victoria, and was educated at Devonport Technical College. He was a building estimator and supervisor, managing director and proprietor of a building consultancy before entering politics.

In his early years, Colbeck gained qualifications in Small Business Management; Technology (Building); and Carpentry and Joinery Trade and Proficiency. He was an apprentice carpenter and joiner between 1977 and 1979; a trainee estimator and supervisor 1977–79; and manager 1979–84. Between 1984 and 1989 he was a building estimator and supervisor; and managing director and proprietor of building consultancy from 1989.

From 1993 to 1996, and from 1998 to 2000, Colbeck served as the president of the Devonport Chamber of Commerce. From 1998 to 2001, he was a member of the board of directors of the Tasmanian Chamber of Commerce and Industry (TCCI). From 1999 to 2002, he was an Alderman of the Devonport City Council.

== Political career ==
On 4 February 2002, Colbeck was appointed to the Senate by the Governor of Tasmania under section 15 of the Constitution, to fill the casual vacancy caused by the retirement of Senator Jocelyn Newman. He had already been elected to the Senate at the 2001 federal election, to a term beginning on 1 July 2002. He was re-elected in 2007.

Colbeck was appointed Parliamentary Secretary to the Minister for Agriculture, Fisheries and Forestry in October 2004. In January 2006 he was appointed Parliamentary Secretary to the Minister for Finance and Administration. With the defeat of the government led by John Howard in 2007, he was appointed to the shadow ministry as Shadow Parliamentary Secretary for Health. He was shifted to the role of Shadow Parliamentary Secretary for Agriculture, Fisheries and Forestry in September 2008. In September 2010, Colbeck was appointed Shadow Parliamentary Secretary for Fisheries and Forestry and Shadow Parliamentary Secretary for Innovation, Industry and Science by the new opposition leader Tony Abbott. Abbott nominated Colbeck for appointment to the Abbott Ministry as the Parliamentary Secretary to the Minister for Agriculture following the 2013 federal election.

Following the 2015 leadership spill that saw Malcolm Turnbull replace Abbott as prime minister, Colbeck was appointed as the Minister Assisting the Minister for Trade and Investment and the Minister for Tourism and International Education in the First Turnbull Ministry from September 2015 to July 2016.

At the 2016 federal election, Colbeck was demoted to fifth place on the Liberal Senate ticket. He blamed factional opponent Eric Abetz for his failure to win a higher position on the ticket. He polled an unusually high below-the-line tally, attributed to a strong "personal vote", but nonetheless lost his seat. Colbeck unexpectedly returned to the Senate in February 2018, after Senate President Stephen Parry was caught up in the parliamentary eligibility crisis. The Court of Disputed Returns conducted a recount and declared Colbeck elected.

Colbeck is considered to belong to the moderate wing of the Tasmanian Liberals, and supported Malcolm Turnbull during the 2018 leadership spills; he was reportedly the only Tasmanian Liberal not to sign the petition calling for a second spill. In the new Morrison Ministry, he was appointed Assistant Minister for Agriculture and Water Resources. Prior to the 2019 federal election he was preselected in first place on the Liberals' Senate ticket and was re-elected.

After the election, Colbeck was appointed Minister for Aged Care and Minister for Youth and Sport in the Second Morrison Ministry. Between August and September 2020, Colbeck was criticised for his handling of COVID-19 outbreaks in aged care facilities in Victoria, resulting in the deaths of 350 aged care residents as of late August 2020. There were calls by the Labor opposition for Colbeck to be sacked as aged care minister. In September 2020, Colbeck was also censured by the Senate by 25–21 votes for failing to take responsibility for a "crisis in the aged care sector", but he was defended by the Prime Minister who said that the majority of the sector was unaffected during the pandemic. In December 2020, his aged care portfolio was subsequently passed to health minister Greg Hunt, with Colbeck continuing as Minister for Senior Australians and Aged Care Services and Minister for Sport. He held these portfolios until May 2022, following the appointment of the Albanese ministry.

During Colbeck's tenure as sport minister, Sport Integrity Australia was created in 2020 as a replacement for the Australian Sports Anti-Doping Authority. A new National Sports Tribunal was also created as the avenue for appeals, replacing the role of the Administrative Appeals Tribunal.

After the 2022 Russian invasion of Ukraine, Colbeck called for the International Shooting Sport Federation to remove Russian billionaire Vladimir Lisin as its President.

Parliament of Australia
Preceded by Jocelyn Newman	Senator for Tasmania; 2002–2016	Succeeded by Jonathon Duniam
Preceded by Stephen Parry	Senator for Tasmania; 2018–present	Incumbent
Political offices
Preceded by Simon Birmingham as Assistant Minister for Education and Training	Minister for Tourism and International Education; 2015–2016	Succeeded by Steven Ciobo as Minister for Trade, Tourism and Investment
Vacant Title last held by Fran Bailey as Minister for Small Business and Tourism	Minister Assisting the Minister for Trade and Investment; 2015–2016	Succeeded by Keith Pitt as Assistant Minister for Trade, Tourism and Investment
Preceded by Anne Ruston	Assistant Minister for Agriculture and Water Resources; 2018–2019	Succeeded by Jonno Duniam as Assistant Minister for Forestry and Fisheries
Preceded by Bridget McKenzie as Minister for Regional Services, Sport, Local Government and Decentralisation	Minister for Sport; 2019–2022	Succeeded by Anika Wells
Vacant Title last held by Kate Ellis as Minister for Early Childhood, Childcare and Youth	Minister for Youth; 2019–2020	Succeeded by Alan Tudge as Minister for Education and Youth
Preceded by Ken Wyatt	Minister for Senior Australians; 2019–2022	Succeeded by Mark Butler as Minister for Health and Ageing
Preceded by Ken Wyatt	Minister for Aged Care; 2019–2020	Succeeded by Greg Hunt as Minister for Health and Aged Care
Preceded by Ken Wyatt	Minister for Aged Care; 2019–2020	Succeeded by Himself as Minister for Aged Care Services
Preceded by Himself as Minister for Aged Care	Minister for Aged Care Services; 2020–2022	Succeeded by Anika Wells as Minister for Aged Care
