= Kurunjang =

- Suburb
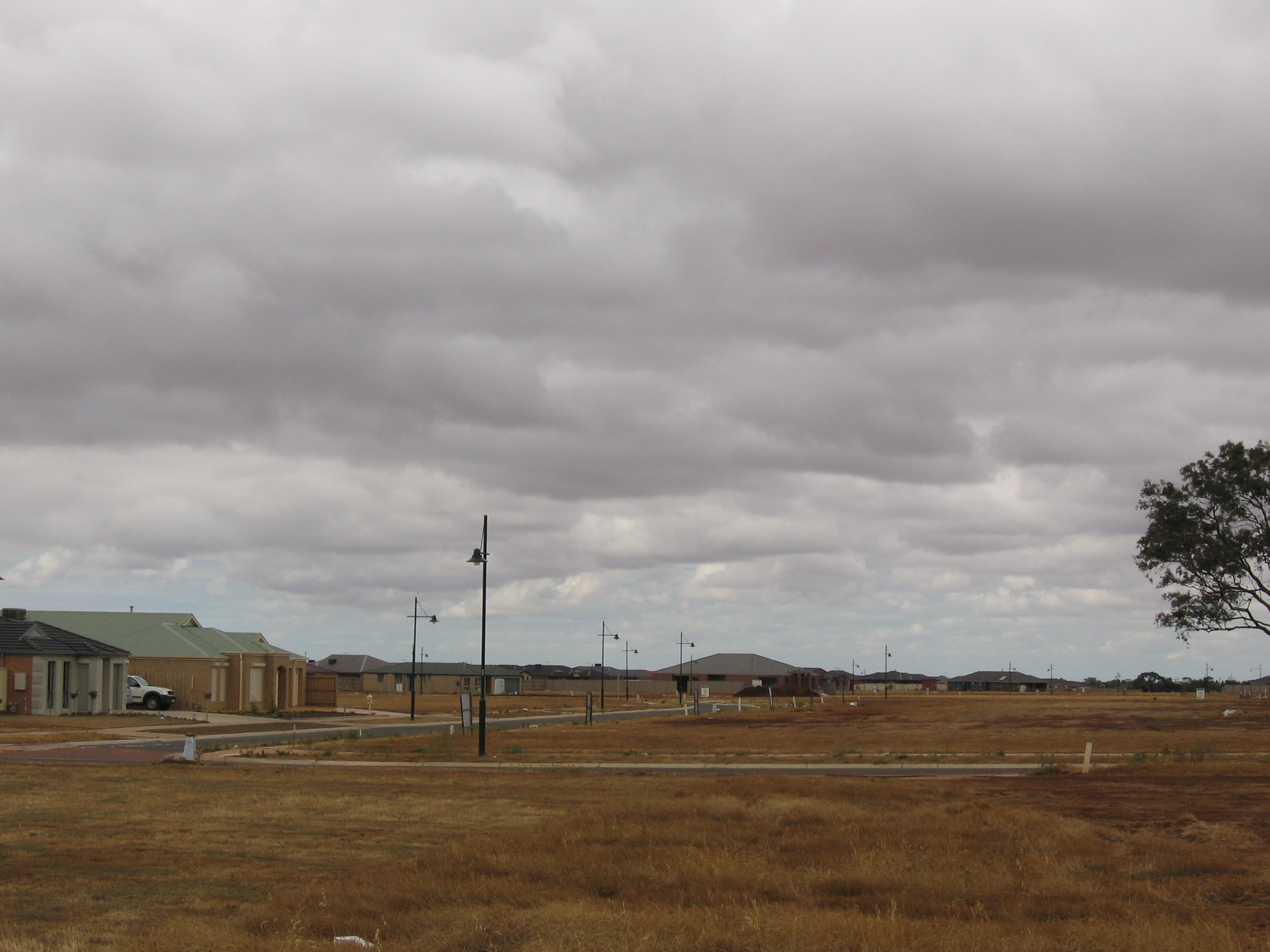
- A new estate near Minns Road, Kurunjang, 2006

- Interactive map of Kurunjang
- Coordinates: 37.672°S 144.585°E
- Country: Australia
- State: Victoria
- City: Melbourne
- LGA: City of Melton
- Location: 36 km (22 mi) from Melbourne CBD

Government
  - State electorate: Melton
  - Federal division: Hawke

Population
  - Total: 10,711 (2021 census)
- Postcode: 3337
Suburbs around Kurunjang
Harkness	Toolern Vale	Toolern Vale
Harkness	Kurunjang	Melton
Melton West	Melton	Melton

Kurunjang is a suburb in Melbourne, Victoria, Australia, 36 km (22 mi) west of Melbourne's Central Business District, located within the City of Melton local government area. Kurunjang recorded a population of 10,711 at the 2021 census. The name is derived from the Woiwurrung word "kūrūng jang" - meaning "red ground".

== Education ==
The suburb contains three schools: Kurunjang Primary School, Kurunjang Secondary College and Heathdale Christian College.

== Recreation ==
Located in the south of the suburb is Kurunjang Recreation Reserve, home to the Satellite City Soccer Club. Adjacent to that are six tennis courts. North-west of Kurunjang Recreation Reserve is the French Athletic and Track field and the Melton Hockey ground. In the north-west of the suburb, there is Pennyroyal park, which has some playground facilities and open space. There is a planned active open space area with a football oval and some tennis courts, which will be located on the currently empty space on Dalray Crescent.

In the south-east of the suburb, there is the Little Blind Creek Reserve, which has some playground facilities. In the east of the suburb, there is a park on the corner of Kirkton Drive and Victoria Avenue. In the north-east of the suburb, there is a large park off Archer Drive, with playground facilities and a basketball court.

In the far north there is an equestrian centre.
