= Minister for Sport (Australia) =

Australian ministerial position

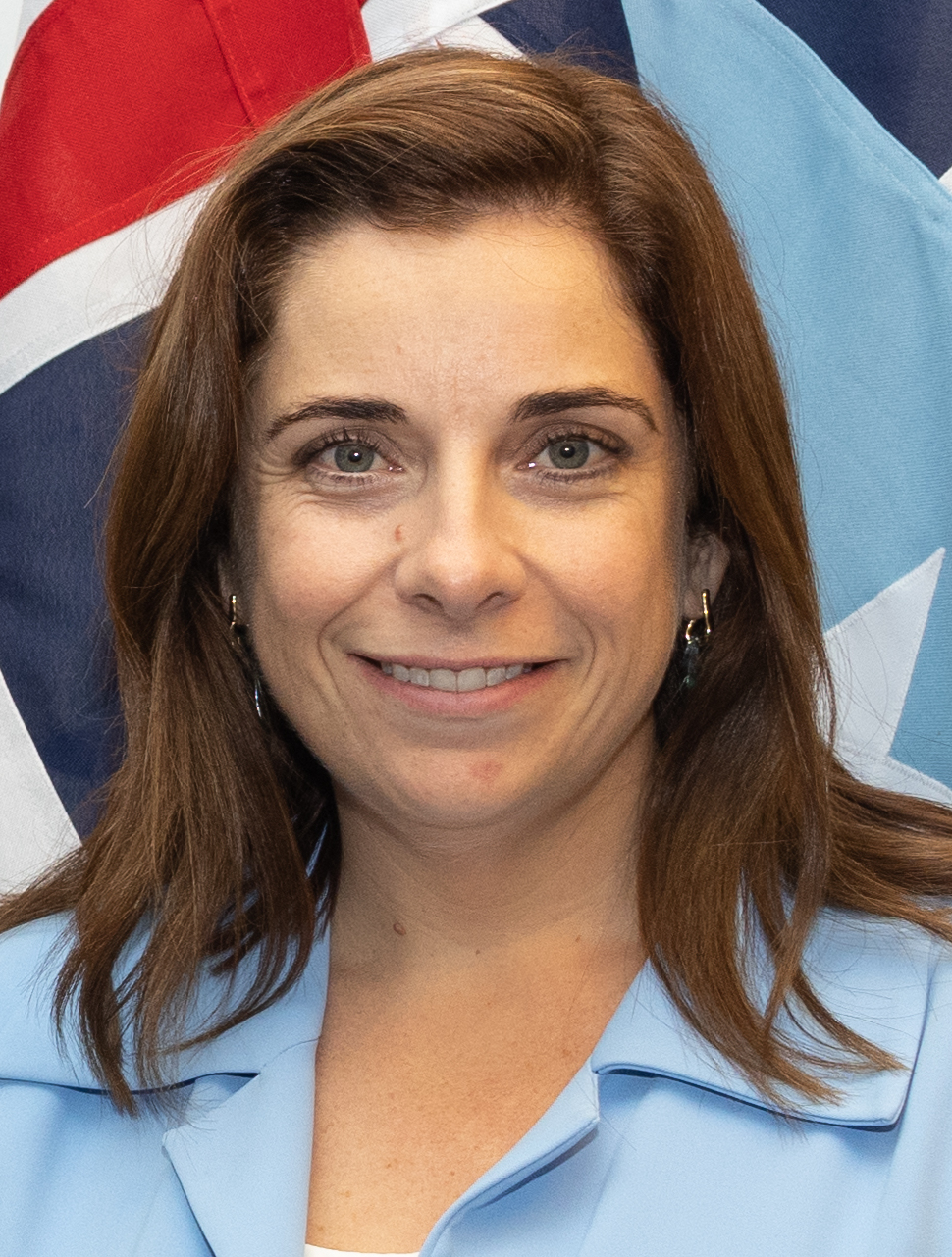
- Incumbent; Anika Wells since 1 June 2022
- Department of Infrastructure, Transport, Regional Development, Communications, Sport and the Arts
- Style: The Honourable
- Appointer: Governor-General on the recommendation of the Prime Minister of Australia
- Inaugural holder: Frank Stewart (as Minister for Tourism and Recreation)
- Formation: 19 December 1972
- Website: minister.infrastructure.gov.au/wells

The Minister for Sport is a ministerial position in the Australian Government, currently held by Anika Wells since 1 June 2022. The minister administers the portfolio through the Department of Infrastructure, Transport, Regional Development, Communications, Sport and the Arts.

== Scope ==
It was not until the Whitlam government established the Department of Tourism and Recreation in 1972 that an Australian Government department had specific responsibility for sport. Previously the small amount of sport funding was distributed through ministries such as Health and Foreign Affairs. Frank Stewart, who is regarded as the first minister for sport, commissioned two reports – The role and scope and development of recreation in Australia by John Bloomfield and Report of the Australian Sports Institute Study Group, which highlighted the need for government involvement in sport. The Fraser government through Bob Ellicott acted upon both reports and established the Australian Institute of Sport in 1981. It was widely reported that this initiative was a direct result of the poor performance of the Australian team at the 1976 Summer Olympics in Montreal, however its genesis preceded that. The Hawke government through John Brown further extended Australian Government involvement in sport through the establishment of the Australian Sports Commission in 1985.

== List of ministers for sport ==
The following individuals have been appointed as Minister for Sport, or any of its precedent titles:

Order	Minister	Party	Prime Minister	Title	Term start	Term end	Term in office
1	Frank Stewart	Labor	Whitlam	Minister for Tourism and Recreation	19 December 1972	11 November 1975	2 years, 327 days
2	Reg Withers	Liberal	Fraser	Minister for Tourism and Recreation	11 November 1975	22 December 1975	41 days
3	Ivor Greenwood	Liberal	Fraser	Minister for Environment, Housing and Community Development	22 December 1975	8 July 1976	199 days
4	Kevin Newman	Liberal	Fraser	Minister for Environment, Housing and Community Development	8 July 1976	20 December 1977	1 year, 165 days
5	Ray Groom	Liberal	Fraser	Minister for Environment, Housing and Community Development	20 December 1977	5 December 1978	350 days
6	Robert Ellicott	Liberal	Fraser	Minister for Home Affairs	5 December 1978	3 November 1980	2 years, 74 days
6	Robert Ellicott	Liberal	Fraser	Minister for Home Affairs and Environment	3 November 1980	17 February 1981	2 years, 74 days
7	Michael MacKellar	Liberal	Fraser	Minister for Home Affairs and Environment	17 February 1981	19 March 1981	30 days
8	Ian Wilson	Liberal	Fraser	Minister for Home Affairs and Environment	19 March 1981	7 May 1982	414 days
9	Tom McVeigh	National Country	Fraser	Minister for Home Affairs and Environment	7 May 1982	11 March 1983	308 days
10	John Brown	Labor	Hawke	Minister for Sport, Recreation and Tourism	11 March 1983	24 July 1987	4 years, 314 days
10	John Brown	Labor	Hawke	Minister for the Arts, Sport, the Environment, Tourism and Territories	24 July 1987	19 January 1988	4 years, 314 days
11	Graham Richardson	Labor	Hawke	Minister for the Arts, Sport, the Environment, Tourism and Territories	19 January 1988	4 April 1990	2 years, 75 days
12	Ros Kelly	Labor	Hawke	Minister for the Arts, Sport, the Environment, Tourism and Territories	4 April 1990	20 December 1991	3 years, 331 days
12	Ros Kelly	Labor	Keating	Minister for the Arts, Sport, the Environment, Tourism and Territories	20 December 1991	27 December 1991	3 years, 331 days
12	Ros Kelly	Labor	Keating	Minister for the Arts, Sport, the Environment and Territories	27 December 1991	24 March 1993	3 years, 331 days
12	Ros Kelly	Labor	Keating	Minister for the Environment, Sport and Territories	24 March 1993	1 March 1994	3 years, 331 days
(11)	Graham Richardson	Labor	Keating	Minister for the Environment, Sport and Territories	1 March 1994	25 March 1994	24 days
13	John Faulkner	Labor	Keating	Minister for the Environment, Sport and Territories	25 March 1994	11 March 1996	1 year, 352 days
14	Warwick Smith	Liberal	Howard	Minister for Sport, Territories and Local Government	11 March 1996	9 October 1997	1 year, 212 days
15	Andrew Thomson	Liberal	Howard	Minister for Sport and Tourism	9 October 1997	21 October 1998	1 year, 12 days
16	Jackie Kelly	Liberal	Howard	Minister for Sport and Tourism	21 October 1998	26 November 2001	3 years, 36 days
17	Rod Kemp	Liberal	Howard	Minister for the Arts and Sport	26 November 2001	30 January 2007	5 years, 65 days
18	George Brandis	Liberal	Howard	Minister for the Arts and Sport	30 January 2007	3 December 2007	307 days
19	Kate Ellis	Labor	Rudd	Minister for Sport	3 December 2007	24 June 2010	2 years, 285 days
19	Kate Ellis	Labor	Gillard	Minister for Sport	24 June 2010	14 September 2010	2 years, 285 days
20	Mark Arbib	Labor	Gillard	Minister for Sport	14 September 2010	5 March 2012	1 year, 173 days
21	Kate Lundy	Labor	Gillard	Minister for Sport	5 March 2012	27 June 2013	1 year, 114 days
22	Don Farrell	Labor	Rudd	Minister for Sport	27 June 2013	18 September 2013	83 days
23	Peter Dutton	Liberal	Abbott	Minister for Sport	18 September 2013	23 December 2014	1 year, 96 days
24	Sussan Ley	Liberal	Abbott	Minister for Sport	23 December 2014	15 September 2015	2 years, 21 days
24	Sussan Ley	Liberal	Turnbull	Minister for Sport	15 September 2015	13 January 2017	2 years, 21 days
25	Greg Hunt	Liberal	Turnbull	Minister for Sport	18 January 2017	19 December 2017	335 days
26	Bridget McKenzie	National	Turnbull	Minister for Sport	20 December 2017	28 August 2018	1 year, 160 days
26	Bridget McKenzie	National	Morrison	Minister for Regional Services, Sport, Local Government and Decentralisation	28 August 2018	29 May 2019	1 year, 160 days
27	Richard Colbeck	Liberal	Morrison	Minister for Youth and Sport	29 May 2019	22 December 2020	2 years, 359 days
27	Richard Colbeck	Liberal	Morrison	Minister for Sport	22 December 2020	23 May 2022	2 years, 359 days
28	Anika Wells	Labor	Albanese	Minister for Sport	1 June 2022	Incumbent	4 years, 98 days

== List of ministers assisting the Prime Minister for the Sydney 2000 Games ==
The following individuals were appointed as Minister Assisting the Prime Minister for the Sydney 2000 Olympic Games:

Order	Minister	Party	Prime Minister	Title	Term start	Term end	Term in office
1	Warwick Smith	Liberal	Howard	Minister Assisting the Prime Minister for the Sydney 2000 Olympic Games	11 March 1996	6 October 1997	1 year, 209 days
2	Andrew Thomson	Liberal	Howard	Minister Assisting the Prime Minister for the Sydney 2000 Olympic Games	6 October 1997	21 October 1998	1 year, 15 days
3	Jackie Kelly	Liberal	Howard	Minister Assisting the Prime Minister for the Sydney 2000 Olympic Games	21 October 1998	30 January 2001	2 years, 101 days

== See also ==
- Minister for Sport (New South Wales)
- Minister for Sport (Victoria)
- Minister for Sport and Recreation (Northern Territory)
- Minister for Sport and Recreation (Western Australia)
