= Melton, Victoria =

Suburb of Melbourne, Victoria, Australia

Melton
- Suburb
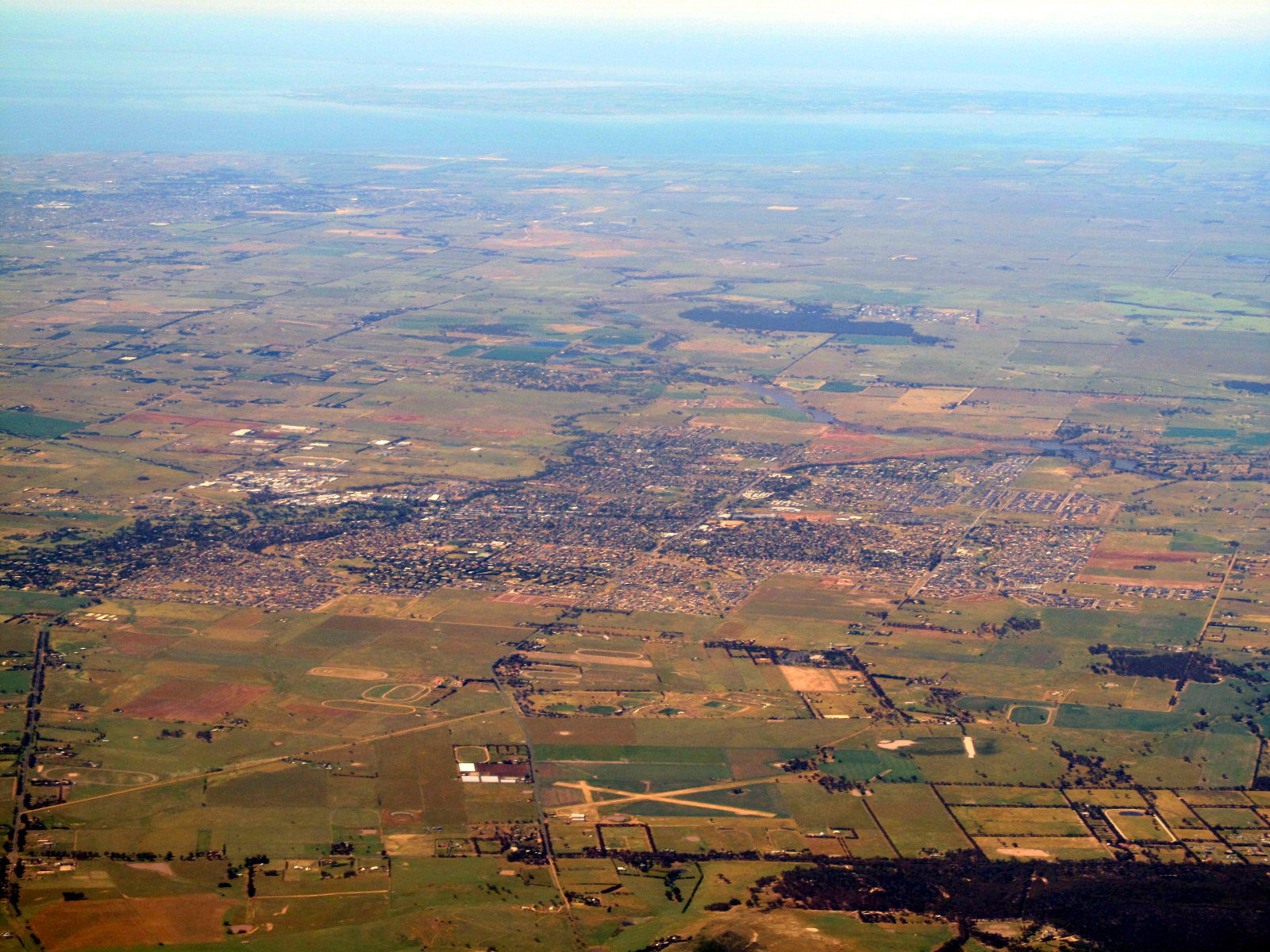
- Aerial view of Melton

- Coordinates: 37°41′0″S 144°35′0″E
- Country: Australia
- State: Victoria
- LGA: City of Melton
- Location: 37 km (23 mi) W of Melbourne CBD
- Established: 1862

Government
  - State electorate: Melton
  - Federal division: Hawke

Area
  - Total: 25.2 km^{2} (9.7 sq mi)

Population
  - Total: 7,953 (2021)
  - Density: 315.6/km^{2} (817.4/sq mi)
- Postcode: 3337
Suburbs around Melton
Harkness	Toolern Vale, Kurunjang	Plumpton
Melton West	Melton	Bonnie Brook, Grangefields
Brookfield	Cobblebank, Melton South	Thornhill Park

Melton is a suburb on the outskirts of Melbourne, Victoria. The suburb is located 37 kilometres (23 mi) west of Melbourne's Central Business District on the city's western rural-urban fringe. It is the administrative centre of the City of Melton local government area. As of the 2021 Australian census, the suburb has a population of 7,953.

Originally a country town along the Ballarat — Melbourne growth corridor, Melton was designated a satellite city of Melbourne in 1974. Along with the rest of the City of Melton, it forms a part of Greater Melbourne and counts as part of its population statistic. In 2023, Melbourne's significant urban area boundary was expanded to include Melton.

Like the overall local government area, Melton was named after Melton Mowbray in the United Kingdom.

== History ==
=== Pre-settlement history ===
The land to the east of the Werribee River is the traditional home of the Wurundjeri and Boon Wurrung people, and to the west, the traditional home of the Wadawurrung. Mount Cottrell is jointly managed by Wurundjeri and Boon Wurrung.

=== 19th and 20th centuries ===
Melton was first settled by squatters establishing sheep runs in the area in the 1830s and a small settlement benefited from traffic passing through it on the way to the Ballarat gold fields during the Victorian Gold Rush. The post office opened on 1 March 1856.

The population of Melton remained stable at around 1,000 - 1,500 until the mid 1950s, rising to 1800 in 1962 and doubling to 3600 in 1968. The first of the larger residential estates was Delphic Realty's Melton Views Estate in 1964.

The area was declared a satellite city in 1974.

=== 21st century ===
The overall City of Melton is forecast to grow in population by over 250,000 by 2051; however, most of this growth is predicted to happen in the surrounding suburbs, particularly in Aintree, Caroline Springs, and Brookfield; the suburb of Melton itself is only predicted to grow 2% by 2051.

Melbourne's significant urban area boundary was redefined to include Melton in 2023, leading to global headlines claiming that Melbourne's population overtook Sydney's.

According to census data, the suburb of Melton has had a relatively stable population since being recognised as a separate suburb on the 2006 census, (Note: The 2001 census only recognises the Melton statistical divisions and the Shire of Melton local government area.) where it had a population of 7,305. The population grew to 7,593 by 2011, then to 8,069 by 2016. The population lowered to 7,953 at the 2021 census.

== Geography and climate ==
Melton is located on mostly flat, largely featureless, former volcanic plains.

To the south-east of Melton is Mount Cottrell, a blast-shield volcano, and to the north-east of the suburb is Mount Kororoit. Mount Cottrell produced some of the largest lava flows in the western Victoria. These two volcanoes are some of the easternmost volcanoes on the Victorian Volcanic Plain which extends to the South Australian border.

Melton receives less rainfall than Melbourne due to the area's position within the Otway Ranges rain shadow. The area has a profound urban heat island effect due to its ongoing rapid suburban development. There is some concern over how continued development and climate change will affect Melton, with particular concern focused on the loss of several threatened animal species' habitat, and an increased risk of bushfires and extreme weather events in the near future. The Melton City Council has noted that the area is "particularly exposed to the impacts of climate change due to its moderate level of socio-economic disadvantage and large proportion of overseas-born residents", along with "significant structural barriers to participating in low-carbon lifestyles including limited local employment opportunities, lack of access to public transport, and inefficient new housing developments".

Precipitation records for Melton follow.

Climate data for Melton (1883–2018); 156m AMSL; 37.66° S, 144.57° E
Month	Jan	Feb	Mar	Apr	May	Jun	Jul	Aug	Sep	Oct	Nov	Dec	Year
Average precipitation mm (inches)	36.8 (1.45)	40.2 (1.58)	38.1 (1.50)	39.5 (1.56)	37.5 (1.48)	35.4 (1.39)	34 (1.3)	35.7 (1.41)	45.7 (1.80)	49.1 (1.93)	47.8 (1.88)	42 (1.7)	486.6 (19.16)
Source: Australian Government

== Arts and culture ==
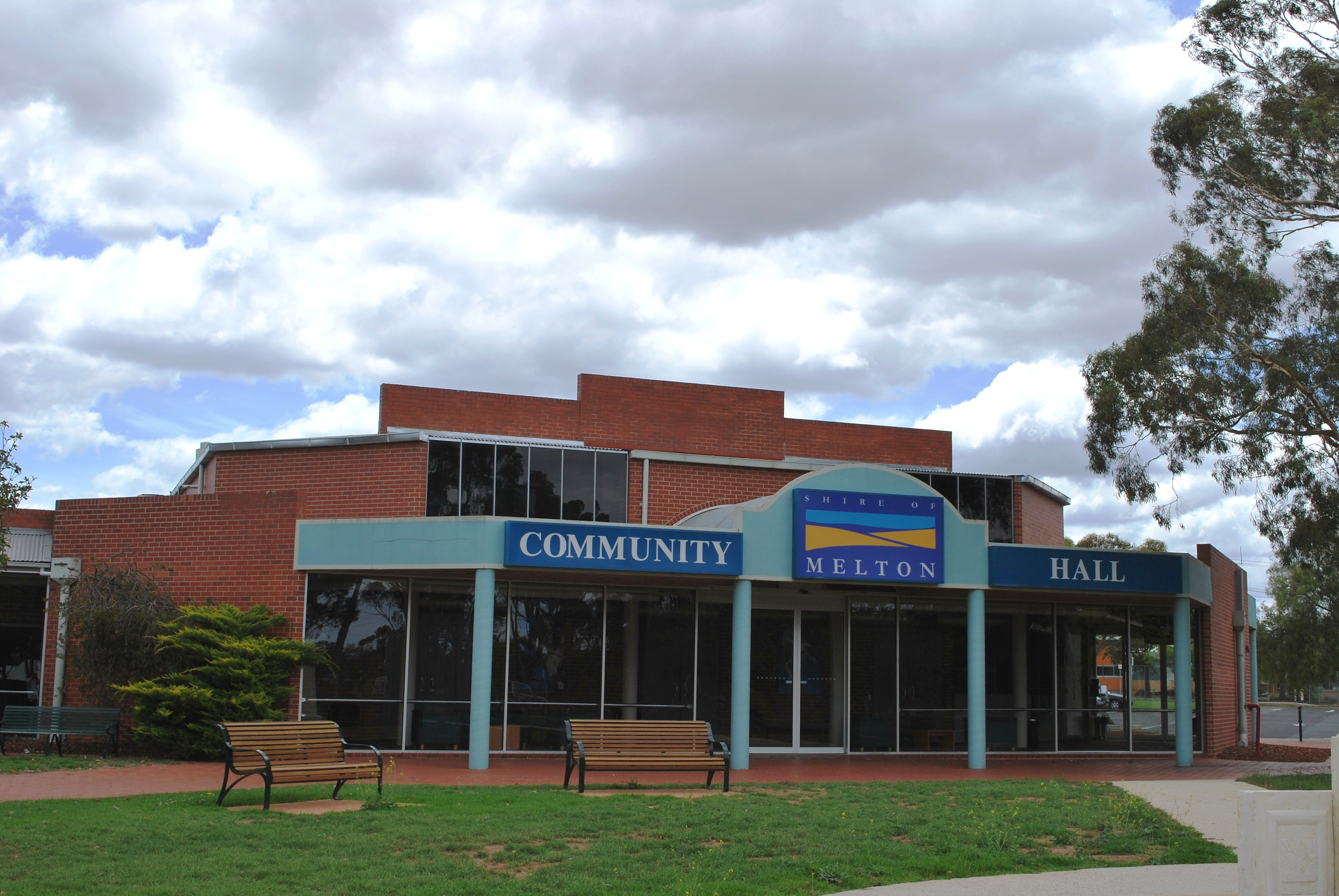
Community Hall

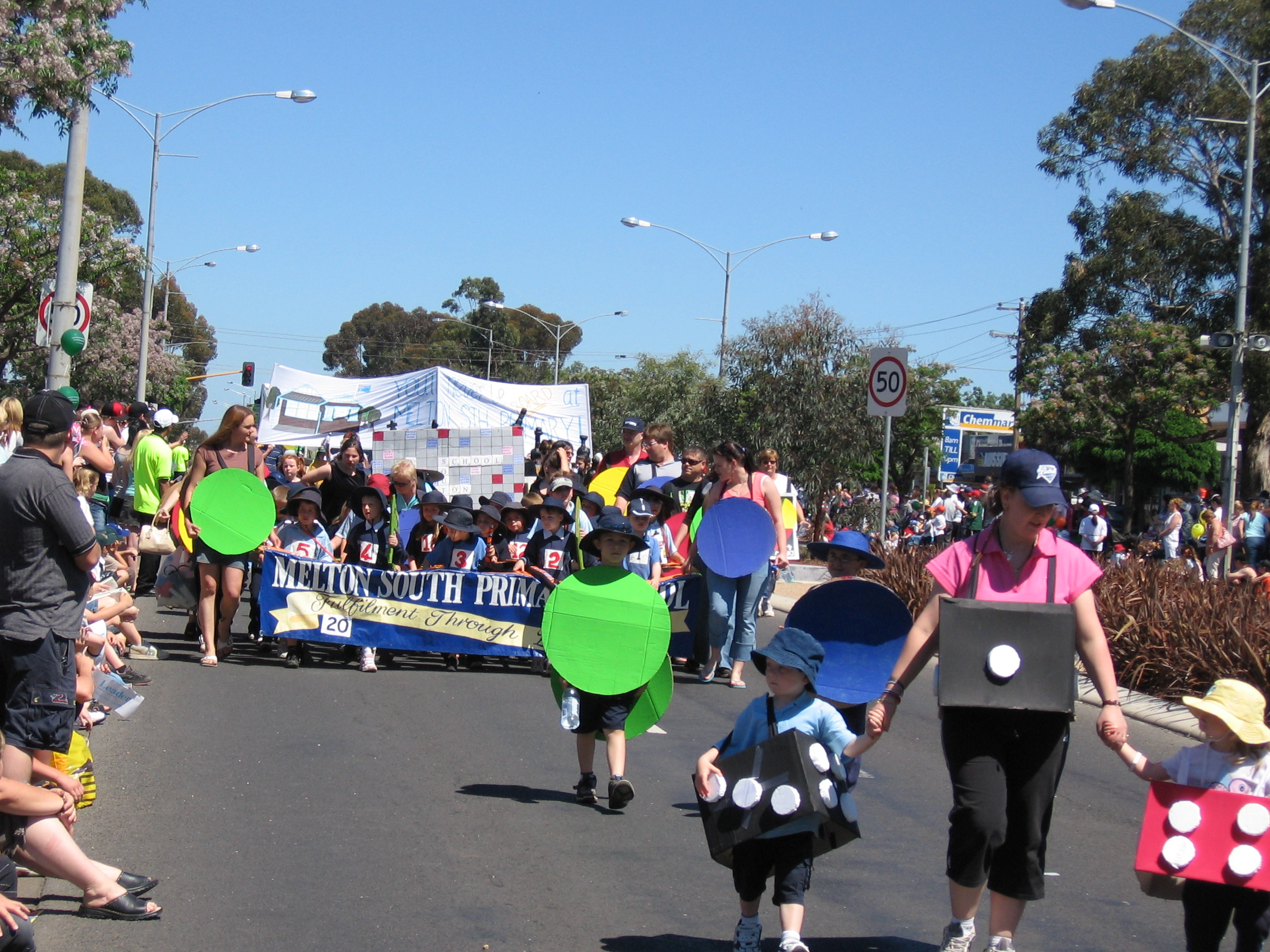
Djerriwarrh Festival parade

Each year the Djerriwarrh Festival is held in the city in November. The festival includes a street parade down High Street, two-day market stalls, and the Lions Club Carnival, held in the Police Paddock on High Street.

The Melton Library and Learning Hub was the first library in Australia to be awarded a 5 Star Green Star rating from the Green Building Council of Australia. It has a theatre, recording studio, wall space for exhibitions and runs several public events.

When the town was first established, the east end of High Street was the centre of town containing the police station, post office, court house, grocery stores, blacksmith, and pubs. High Street remains the main activity centre, with the surrounding streets forming the Melton Town Centre and the Central Walk Shopping Centre.

Melton has a botanic garden.

Golfers play at the course of the Melton Valley Golf Club on Melton Valley Drive.

== Governance ==
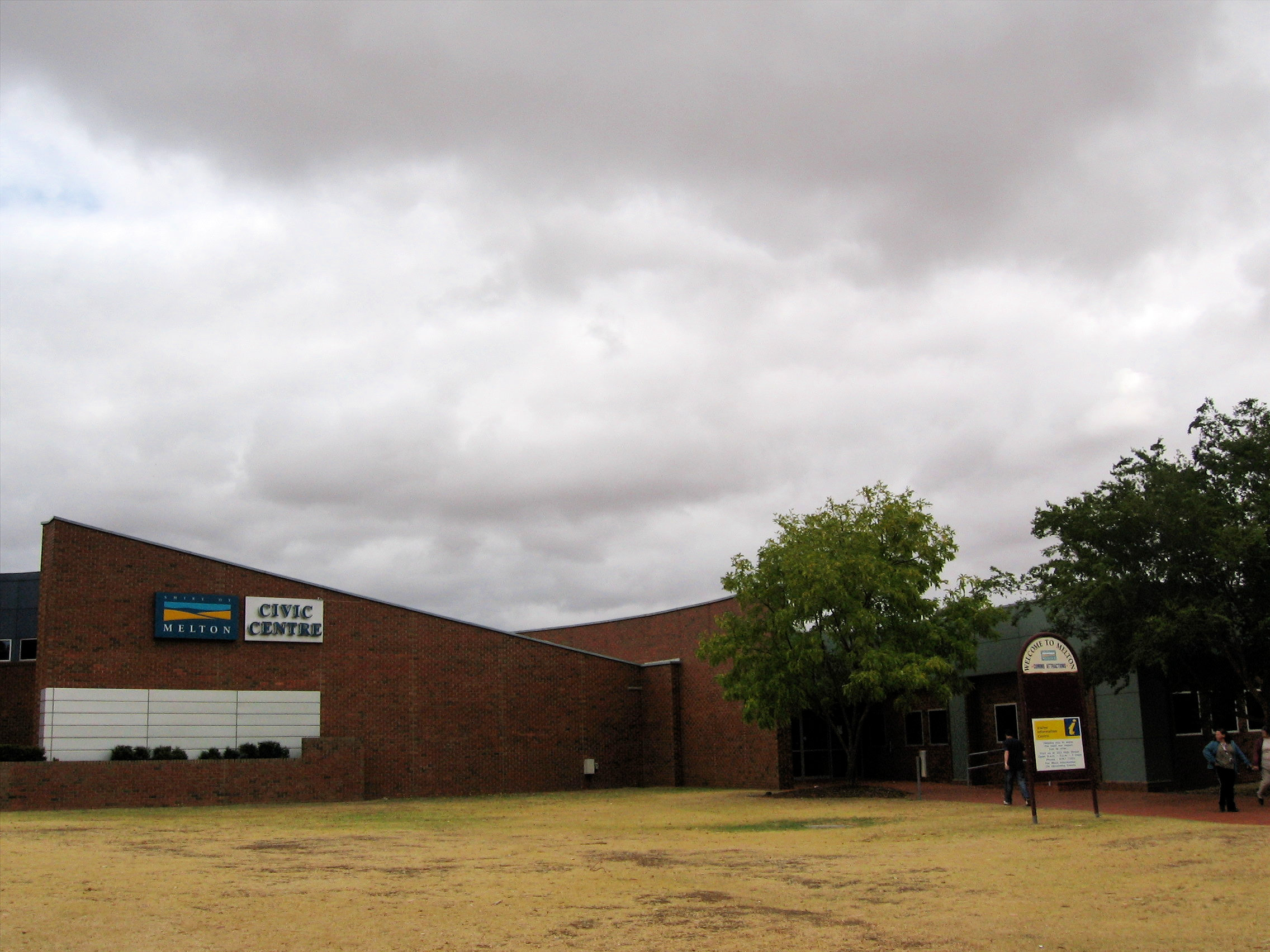
City of Melton offices

Melton is the administrative centre for the City of Melton.

Its state electorate is the electoral district of Melton, and its federal electorate is the division of Hawke, currently held by Sam Rae. Since the electoral division's inception in 1992, Melton has elected only Labor members. Hawke was won by Labor at its first election in 2022.

== Media ==
Melton receives the same digital television stations as Melbourne. It is also within the broadcast range of all commercial radio stations from Melbourne, and is an end point for digital radio broadcasts in metropolitan Melbourne. Broadcast signals diminish towards the west.

Melton shares one local newspaper with the neighbouring Shire of Moorabool, the Melton & Moorabool Star Weekly.

Melton has one local radio station, 979fm, and can receive Apple FM broadcasting from nearby Bacchus Marsh.

== Transport ==
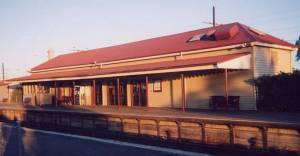
Melton Station

=== Road ===
Melton has been identified by the Department of Transport as one of the most car-dependent communities in Greater Melbourne. The Western Highway is the main road transport link from Melton to Melbourne. The Melton Highway links Melton to the Calder Highway — and thus to the Melbourne Airport — via nearby suburb Taylors Lakes.

Several bus services are operated across Melton by Transit Systems Victoria and Christians Bus, using Volvo B10BLE, B7RLE and B8RLE using Volgren CR228L, Optimus and Upgraded Optimus bodies. Sometimes we will get a Mercedes-Benz O 500 LE with a custom coaches body. Melton has 3 major bus stops with the Melton Bus Interchange being located on Palmerston Street. Woodgrove Shopping Centre being located on High Street and Melton Station being located on Brooklyn Road. The following bus routes are operated via the Melton Bus Interchange:

- 452 From Eynesbury to Melton Station Via Weir Views.
- 453 From Melton Bus Interchange towards Melton station via Brookfield
- 454 From Cobblebank Station to Melton Station Via Atherstone
- 455 From Sugar Berry Rise towards Melton station via Micasa Rise (Harkness), and towards Micasa Rise
- 456 From Woodgrove Shopping Centre towards Sunshine station via Caroline Springs, and towards Woodgrove Shopping Centre
- 457 From Melton Bus Interchange towards Melton station via Melton West
- 458 From Kurunjang Central towards Melton station via Kurunjang, and towards Kurunjang
- 459 From Arnolds Creek Primary School to Melton Station Via Waterview

=== Rail ===
Rail passengers use the Melton railway station located in neighbouring suburb Melton South. The Melton railway line forms part of the Ballarat V/Line rail service, with trains running between Melton and Southern Cross once every 20 minutes during peak and once every 40 minutes off-peak, including on weekends.

Melton's train service is known for being overcrowded. Funding was committed in the 2023 Victorian State Budget to investigate upgrading stations along the railway line to allow for nine-carriage V/Line VLocity trains to run on the line; this upgrade is currently planned to be delivered in 2027.

Electrification of the line up to Melton was recommended in Public Transport Victoria's 2013 Network Development Plan, and quadruplication was included in the 2018 Western Rail Plan. In 2025, a track diagram was released showing changes that will be made as part of the major upgrades planned for Sunshine Station to enable greater rail capacity to the western suburbs. According to the diagram, quadruplication is planned to occur between a junction site near Caroline Springs and Sunshine; the new tracks will run into a new pair of platforms at Sunshine. The tracks at Sunshine will be reconfigured to route the future electrified Melton service through the Metro Tunnel.

=== Air ===
The Melton Airfield, located in neighbouring suburb Toolern Vale, provides general aviation.

== Education ==
Melton itself contains two primary schools - the public Melton Primary School located on Unitt Street, and the independent St. Dominic's Catholic Primary School located on Church Street. Melton Secondary College is in the neighbouring suburb of Melton West.

=== Primary schools in surrounding suburbs ===
- Wedge Park Primary School – Cambrian Way, Melton West
- St. Catherine of Siena Primary School – Bulmans Road, Melton West
- St. Anthony of Padua Primary School – Wilson Road, Melton South
- Melton South Primary School – Station Road, Melton South
- Melton West Primary School – West Melton Drive, Melton West
- Coburn Primary School – Richards Road, Melton South
- Exford Primary School – Exford Road, Exford
- Kurunjang Primary School – Kurunjang Drive, Kurunjang
- Toolern Vale and District Primary School – Creamery Road, Toolern Vale
- Arnold's Creek Primary School – Claret Ash Boulevard, Harkness

=== Secondary schools in surrounding suburbs ===
- Kurunjang Secondary College – Kurunjang Drive, Kurunjang
- Melton Secondary College – High Street, Melton West
- Saint Francis Catholic College – Bulmans Road, Melton West
- Saint Francis Catholic College - Alfred Road, Cobblebank
- Staughton College – Wilson Road, Melton South
- Melton Christian College – Brooklyn Road, Brookfield
- Heathdale Christian College - Melton Campus – Centenary Avenue, Kurunjang

=== Specialist school ===
- Melton Specialist School – Coburns Road, Melton West

== Notable people ==
Main page: Category:People from Melton, Victoria

- Paul Curtis - footballer, 2003 - .
- Matt Goggin - footballer, 1936 - 1972
- Vanessa O'Hanlon - television presenter,
- Brent Owens - chef, 1989 - .
- Dan Repacholi - olympic athlete, politician, 1982 -
- Henry Caselli Richards - professor, geologist, teacher, 1884 – 1947
- John F. Shelton - footballer, 1903 -1983.
- Alf Smith (Australian footballer) - footballer, 1867 – 1936.
- Loudy Wiggins (nee Tourky) - olympic athlete, diver, 1979 -
- Simon Wiggins - footballer, 1982 -
