= Alf Smith (Australian footballer) =

Australian rules footballer

Personal information
- Full name: Alfred Smith
- Born: 20 April 1867; Melton, Victoria
- Died: 9 February 1936 (aged 68); East Melbourne, Victoria

Playing career^{1}
Years	Club	Games (Goals)
1886-1894	St Kilda (VFA)	157 (72)
1898	St Kilda	1 (0)
Total		158 (72)
- ^{1} Playing statistics correct to the end of 1898.

Alfred Smith (20 April 1867 – 9 February 1936) was an Australian rules footballer who played for the St Kilda Football Club in the Victorian Football League (VFL).
