= Melton Christian College =

Christian school in Australia

Coordinates: 37.7002°S 144.5600°E

Melton Christian College (MCC) is a Christian school in Melton, Victoria, Australia, which houses grade Preps up to Year 12. It currently has over 1400 students and over 150 staff over 3 campuses.

== Campuses ==
They first campus was Brookfield campus in Melton South. In 2023 a campus in Toolern Vale opened and in 2025 an online year 7–8 (later 7–9) opened as well

== Core Values ==
The college contains worship towards God and has 5 core values. Respect, Excellence, Passion for Teaching and Learning, Christ Centereness and Community.

== History ==
First opened in 1985 this school has grown exponentially over the years starting from 9 students to over 1400 in 2026. It introduced year 12 in 2001 and Alternate campuses in 2023 and 2025.

== See also ==
- List of schools in Victoria
- Victorian Certificate of Education
