= Melton Secondary College =

Coordinates: 37°40′54″S 144°33′59″E

Melton Secondary College Melton High School

Location
- Cnr Coburns Road and High Street; Melton, Victoria; Australia

Information
- Former name: Melton High School
- Motto: "Academic Excellence" formerly "Strive For Excellence"
- Established: 1975
- Principal: David Reynolds
- Years: 7 to 12
- Enrollment: Approximately 800
- Colours: Navy, blue and white formerly gold and dark green (year 7 to 10) and jade green and white (VCE)
- Nickname: MSC
- Website: www.meltonsc.vic.edu.au

Melton Secondary College was the first secondary school built in Melton, Victoria, Australia. The school currently offers studies in 34 VCE subjects and 23 VET subjects.

== Houses ==
Interhouse competitions remain an integral part of the school's ethos.

The four Houses with their associated colours are:

- Yangardook (Red)
- Kororoit (Blue)
- Djerriwarrh (Green)
- Pywheitjorrk (Yellow)

The names for the houses were derived from local waterways.

The houses compete in 2 Major Competitions:

- Athletics
- Swimming

Kororoit current champions for athletics and swimming in 2013.

== Music ==
There is a Concert Band which reached a peak in 2006 with more than 75 members attending regular rehearsals and music lessons.

=== Other Major Ensembles ===
- Jazz
- Woodwind
- Brass
- Flute
- Guitar
- Vocal

Workshops with outstanding artists

Major Pat Picket, Don Burrows, James Morrison, Graeme Lylall, Gary Hommelhoff, New Zealand Army Band, Australian Army Band, Major Peter Grant, Mark Summerbell – Orchestra Victoria, Peter Moore – Orchestra Victoria, 2005–2009 ORCHESTRA VICTORIA

Awards

1st School from Victoria to perform at "Movieworld". (2000)

1st School in the Western Suburbs to make a CD at Tamworth, N.S.W. (2000)

1st School in the Western suburbs to win the Boorandara Eistedfod. (1998)

1st School in the Western Suburbs to win the State "C" Grade Championship. (1999, 2005)

1st School in the Western Suburbs to win the State "Novice" Grade Championship.(2002)

Bendigo Eistedfod – Won "C grade" Concert Band and Jazz Ensemble, (2004–2006, 2007)

2nd Boxhill State Championships "B" Grade. (2006) "Music Play for Life" - Guitars in schools Project (2006)

1st State Championships "C" Grade. (2008)

== Rock Eisteddfod Challenge ==
Melton Secondary College had a very successful Rock Eisteddfod team for many years. Among the achievements:

- 1994: The Beatles
- 1995: Space Impressions (Junior Team)
- 1995: Body Image (Senior Team)
- 1996: Special Days (Junior Team)
- 1996: Casanova (Senior Team)
- 1997: Gold Rush (Junior Team)
- 1997: Elvis (Senior Team)
- 1998: From the Tsar With Love – Revolution (Based on the Russian Revolution and the Tsar Nicholas II): 1st Place, Open Division
- 1999: What's For Dinner? (Based on the Addams Family): 5th Place, Premier Division – The first Victorian school in its state to obtain a place in their first year in Premier Division
- 2000: De Amor En Espana – Love in Spain (Roughly based on the musical Carmen): 5th Place, Premier Division
- 2001: Rock'n'the River (Roughly based on Showboat): 6th Place, Premier Division
- 2002: Gentleman Prefer Blondes (Based on the life of Marilyn Monroe): 2nd Place, Premier Division and Victorian finalist for Nationals
- 2003: Deutschland – From Hope to Heartbreak (Based on the musical Cabaret): 4th Place, Premier Division
- 2004: Free as a bird (based on Aladdin) 11th Place Premier Division
- 2005: Isadora Duncan – Mother of Modern Dance – Premier Division, 5th Place
- 2006: Toulouse Lautrec – A Lost Time
- 2007: HOPE – Live Life. Be Strong (A tribute the cancer charities)
- 2007 welcomed a new team for including Jennifer Toner (Director and Head Choreographer), Jarryd Pentony, Taneesha Pentony, Natalie Desmond, Jessica McMurrie, Leigh Walker, Amanda Cini, Chris Ferreira (set designer)
- 2008: Do You Think We're Joking (based on Batman) Marilyn Sorensen (Director) and Kate Mainwaring (assistant director)

Previous production team included, among others:

- Debra Dunn (liaison 1990–1998)
- Mik Pollard (liaison 1999–2001, 2004–2005 and motivator involved for a period of 13 years)
- Janice Kot (Producer, Director and Head Choreographer 1994–2004)
- Olivia Tardio (Lead Choreographer 1 year)
- Melissa Barker, Paul Rizzo (who went onto a successful career as a world touring and award-winning Michael Jackson tribute artist), Nova Stelarc, Fiona Pettett, Belinda Guban, Janelle Mace, Stephen Wakefield (Choreographers)
- Mark Baddeley, Helen Beynon, Kate Kershaw, David Tait, Chris Egan, Peter Hendrickson, John McConchie and many others (Teachers)
- Alan Marsh (Set Designer 1999–2003)
- The 'Dad's Army' (Set Construction 1999–2003)
- Tony Glover (Soundtrack Producer)
- Judy Marsh, Carol Harraden, Dianne Glover, Heather Tyrell (Costume Designers)
- The Kot, Marsh, Harraden, Glover, Tyrell, Jones, Rizzo and Carroll families

== Sister schools ==
A sister school relationship exists internationally with Showa Junior High School, Okayama in Japan.

== See also ==
- List of schools in Victoria
- Victorian Certificate of Education
