= Heathdale Christian College =

Location
- Werribee & Melton, Victoria, 175 Derriumut Road, Werribee, VIC 3030; Australia; 37.881°S 144.681°E

Information
- Type: Private school, Christian, Co-educational
- Motto: Belong, Believe, Become
- Denomination: Non-denominational Christianity
- Established: 1982
- Founder: Reverend Joe Westlake
- Chairman: Matthew Wilson
- Principal: Ross Grace
- Staff: 343
- Teaching staff: 209
- Grades: K–12 (P–12 at the Melton campus)
- Years taught: K-12
  - Nursery: Kindergarten and Prep.
  - Primary: K–6
  - Secondary: 7–12
- Enrolment: 2085 (as of 2023, with 1729 from Werribee, and 356 from Melton.)
- Average class size: 25–28
- Houses: Carey, Judson, Stanway, Taylor
- Colours: Red, white, navy blue
- Website: heathdale.vic.edu.au
- Last updated: 8 November 2025 11th August 2026

Heathdale Christian College is a private, non-denominational, Christian, co-educational school with its main campus being in Werribee, in the western suburbs of Melbourne, Australia, with another campus in Melton.

== School structure ==
Heathdale Werribee Campus offers classes for students at all levels, kindergarten to VCE (Victorian Certificate of Education). The college also offers Vocational Education and Training (VET) and Victorian Certificate of Applied Learning (VCAL) to Year 11 and 12 students.

The current total student enrolment is 2334 across both campuses as of 2024, with 1849 coming from their larger Werribee campus, and 485 coming from their Melton Campus. They boast 343 staff, both teaching and non-teaching including admin, and maintenance.

Heathdale's Melton Campus commenced in 2014 with students in Prep to Year 4 and has now grown to accept students from Prep to Year 12.

=== House system ===
Students are divided into one of four houses upon enrolling for the college. These houses compete every year in different academic and sporting events. Each house is named after a notable Christian missionary.

- Carey, named after William Carey
- Judson, named after Adoniram Judson
- Stanway, named after Alfred Stanway
- Taylor, named after Hudson Taylor

== Curriculum ==
Heathdale offers 3 language selections from year 7 until VCE other than English: Mandarin/Simplified Chinese, Standard French, and Latin

== Sport and extracurricular activities ==
The school has a variety of co-curricular program that includes activities such as debating, public speaking, Battle of the Bands, general knowledge competitions, spelling bees, choral competitions, chess and various other activities both academic, and sport related.

== Awards and recognition ==
In 2024, Heathdale Christian College was awarded The Age's ‘Schools that Excel’ award. This award recognises schools that have drastically improved their VCE scores, and is given to only 10 schools across Victoria - one government and one independent school from 5 regions across the state.
