= Minister for Aged Care and Seniors =

Australian ministerial position

- Commonwealth Coat of Arms

- Flag of Australia
- Incumbent; Sam Rae since 13 May 2025
- Department of Health, Disability and Ageing
- Appointer: Governor-General on the recommendation of the Prime Minister of Australia
- Inaugural holder: Peter Morris (as Minister for Housing and Aged Care)
- Formation: 19 January 1988
- Website: www.health.gov.au/ministers/the-hon-sam-rae-mp

The Minister for Aged Care and Seniors is a position in the Australian Government responsible for oversight of aged care in Australia alongside the Minister for Health and Ageing, who is the senior minister providing direction and oversight of the Department of Health, Disability and Ageing. The incumbent Minister for Aged Care and Seniors is Labor MP Sam Rae, serving since 13 May 2025.

== List of ministers for aged care ==
The following individuals have been appointed as the Minister for Aged Care and Seniors, or any of its precedent titles. Ministers for aged care or ageing were appointed from 1988 to 1993 and again from 1998 to 2013. The portfolio gained a mental health component in 2010. The latter returned to the health portfolio in 2013, with ageing moving to social services. The following individuals have been appointed as Minister for Mental Health and Ageing, or any of its precedent titles: The Turnbull government transferred the aged care portfolio back to the Department of Health in October 2015. The position is a separate role that supplements the cabinet role of the Minister for Health and Aged Care. Between January 2017 and January 2025, it was an outer ministry role. The role was briefly made a Cabinet of Australia role in the first Albanese ministry from January to May 2025, before it returned to the outer ministry in May 2025 with the swearing-in of the second Albanese ministry.

Order	Minister	Party	Prime Minister	Title	Term start	Term end	Term in office
1	Peter Morris	Labor	Hawke	Minister for Housing and Aged Care	19 January 1988	15 February 1988	27 days
2	Peter Staples	Labor	Hawke	Minister for Housing and Aged Care	15 February 1988	7 May 1990	5 years, 64 days
2	Peter Staples	Labor	Hawke	Minister for Aged, Family and Health Services	7 May 1990	20 December 1991	5 years, 64 days
2	Peter Staples	Labor	Keating	Minister for Aged, Family and Health Services	20 December 1991	24 March 1993	5 years, 64 days
3	Bronwyn Bishop	Liberal	Howard	Minister for Aged Care	21 October 1998	26 November 2001	3 years, 36 days
4	Kevin Andrews	Liberal	Howard	Minister for Ageing	26 November 2001	7 October 2003	1 year, 315 days
5	Julie Bishop	Liberal	Howard	Minister for Ageing	7 October 2003	27 January 2006	2 years, 112 days
6	Santo Santoro	Liberal	Howard	Minister for Ageing	27 January 2006	21 March 2007	1 year, 53 days
7	Christopher Pyne	Liberal	Howard	Minister for Ageing	21 March 2007	3 December 2007	257 days
8	Justine Elliot	Labor	Rudd	Minister for Ageing	3 December 2007	28 June 2010	2 years, 207 days
9	Mark Butler	Labor	Gillard	Minister for Mental Health and Ageing	28 June 2010	1 July 2013	3 years, 3 days
10	Jacinta Collins	Labor	Rudd	Minister for Mental Health and Ageing	1 July 2013	18 September 2013	79 days
11	Sussan Ley	Liberal	Turnbull	Minister for Aged Care	30 September 2015	19 July 2016	1 year, 105 days
11	Sussan Ley	Liberal	Turnbull	Minister for Health and Ageing	19 July 2016	13 January 2017	1 year, 105 days
(acting)	Arthur Sinodinos	Liberal	Turnbull	Minister for Health and Ageing	13 January 2017	24 January 2017	11 days
12	Ken Wyatt	Liberal	Turnbull	Minister for Aged Care	24 January 2017	28 August 2018	2 years, 125 days
12	Ken Wyatt	Liberal	Morrison	Minister for Senior Australians and Aged Care	28 August 2018	29 May 2019	2 years, 125 days
13	Richard Colbeck	Liberal	Morrison	Minister for Aged Care and Senior Australians	29 May 2019	22 December 2020	2 years, 359 days
13	Richard Colbeck	Liberal	Morrison	Minister for Senior Australians and Aged Care Services	22 December 2020	23 May 2022	2 years, 359 days
(9)	Mark Butler	Labor	Albanese	Minister for Health and Aged Care	1 June 2022	13 May 2025	4 years, 98 days
(9)	Mark Butler	Labor	Albanese	Minister for Health and Ageing	13 May 2025	Incumbent	4 years, 98 days
14	Anika Wells	Labor	Albanese	Minister for Aged Care	1 June 2022	13 May 2025	2 years, 346 days
15	Sam Rae	Labor	Albanese	Minister for Aged Care and Seniors	13 May 2025	Incumbent	1 year, 117 days

== List of assistant ministers ==
The following individual has been appointed as Assistant Ministers of Health and Aged Care, or any of its precedent titles:

Order	Minister	Party	Prime Minister	Title	Term start	Term end	Term in office
1	Christopher Pyne	Liberal	Howard	Assistant Minister for Health and Ageing	30 January 2007	21 March 2007	50 days
2	Ken Wyatt	Liberal	Turnbull	Assistant Minister for Health	30 September 2015	18 February 2016	1 year, 110 days
2	Ken Wyatt	Liberal	Turnbull	Assistant Minister for Health and Aged Care	18 February 2016	18 January 2017	1 year, 110 days
3	David Gillespie	Nationals	Turnbull	Assistant Minister for Health	24 January 2017	20 December 2017	330 days
4	Ged Kearney	Labor	Albanese	Assistant Minister for Health and Aged Care	1 June 2022	13 May 2025	2 years, 346 days
5	Rebecca White	Labor	Albanese	Assistant Minister for Health and Aged Care	13 May 2025	Incumbent	1 year, 117 days
