= Coimadai =

- Town
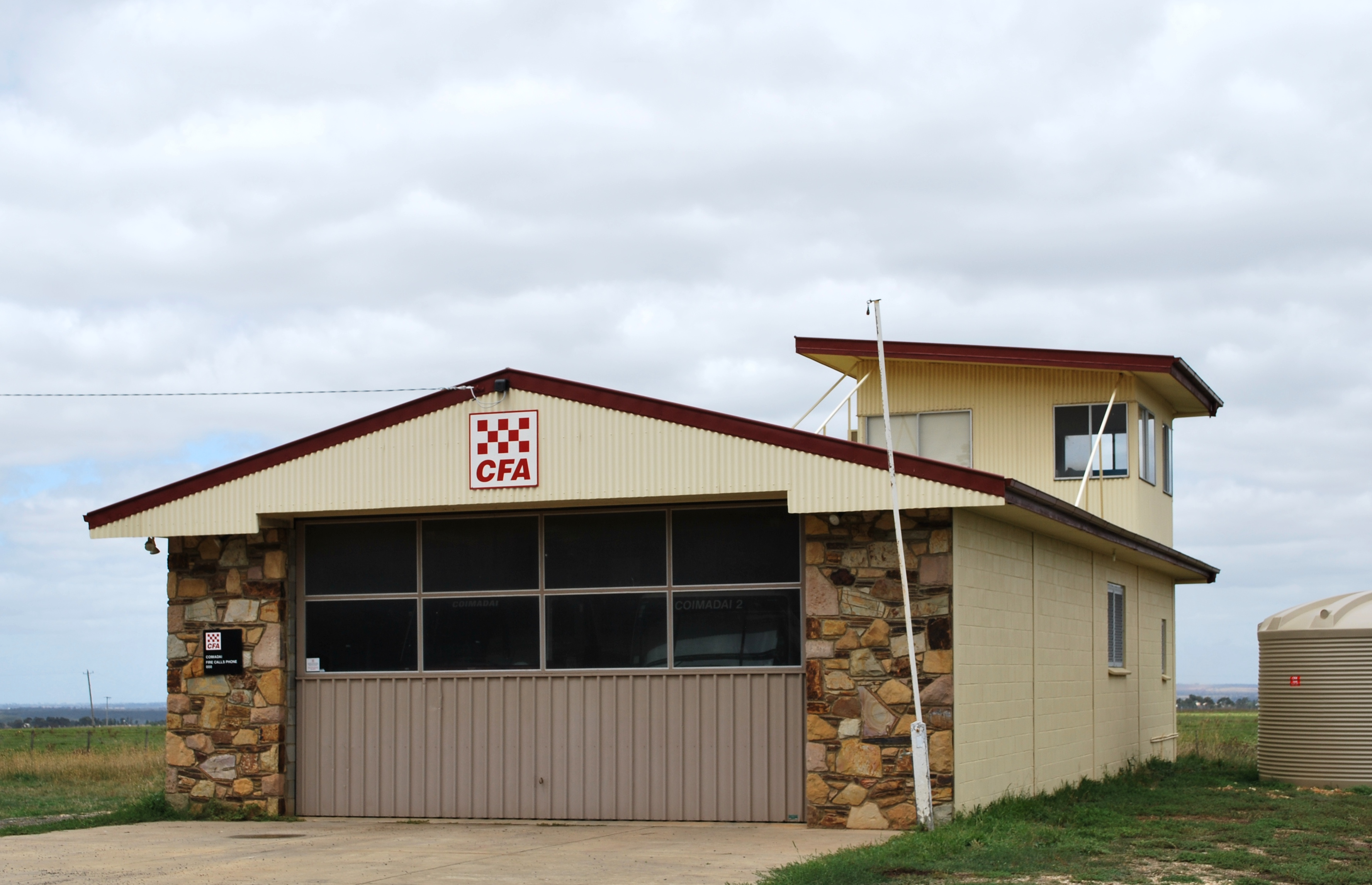
- Country Fire Authority shed at Coimadai

- Coordinates: 37°36′33″S 144°27′08″E
- Country: Australia
- State: Victoria
- LGA: Shire of Moorabool
- Location: 63 km (39 mi) WNW of Melbourne; 12 km (7.5 mi) N of Bacchus Marsh

Government
  - State electorate: Macedon
  - Federal division: Hawke

Population
  - Total: 409 (2021 census)
- Postcode: 3340

Coimadai (/ˈkɒmaɪdə/) is a locality in central Victoria, Australia. The locality is in the Shire of Moorabool, 63 kilometres (39 mi) west of the state capital, Melbourne. The town name comes from an Aboriginal word meaning "Resting Male Kangaroo".

At the 2021 census, Coimadai had a population of 409.
