= Sam Rae =

Australian politician (born 1986)

The Honourable Sam Rae MP

Minister for Aged Care and Seniors
- Incumbent
- Assumed office 13 May 2025
- Prime Minister: Anthony Albanese
- Preceded by: Anika Wells

Member of the Australian Parliament for Hawke
- Incumbent
- Assumed office 21 May 2022
- Preceded by: New seat

Personal details
- Born: 29 September 1986 (age 40) Canberra, Australia
- Party: Labor
- Education: Australian National University; Melbourne Business School

Samuel Thomas Rae (born 29 September 1986) is an Australian politician and a member of the Australian House of Representatives for the Division of Hawke. He was first elected at the 2022 Australian federal election. Prior to his election he was a state secretary for the Labor Party and a partner at PwC.

He holds a Master of Business Administration (MBA) from Melbourne Business School and a Bachelor of Science from the Australian National University.

== Early life ==
Rae was born on 29 September 1986 in Canberra, the son of a public-school teacher. He attended Fadden Primary School, Alfred Deakin High School and Narrabundah College. He holds a Bachelor of Science from the Australian National University (ANU), a graduate diploma in management and a Master of Business Administration from Melbourne Business School.

== Career ==
After leaving school, Rae worked as a factory labourer, going on to several other jobs, including call centre phone operator and childcare worker. After leaving ANU, he was a policy advisor for the National Association of Forest Industries and then an advisor to senator Stephen Conroy.

Rae was Victorian Labor's Director of Research and Tactics for the 2016 federal election campaign, and was later appointed State Secretary and Campaign Director of Victorian Labor in 2016. He is credited for his leadership of Victorian Labor's landslide 2018 state election campaign, which saw Labor win an additional 11 seats from the Liberal Party and the Greens.

Rae left Victorian Labor to join PwC as a partner in its strategy and management consulting division, where he worked until his election to parliament.

== Politics ==
Rae was preselected for the newly established seat of Hawke in June 2021 by the Australian Labor Party. Rae was elected as the first member for Hawke at the 2022 federal election. He is said to be a key ally of Richard Marles, and a key member of the Victorian Labor Right faction.

During the 2022 election campaign, as the Labor candidate for Hawke, Rae announced that an elected Labor government would commit $10 million towards planning for the Western Freeway upgrade between Melton and Caroline Springs.

=== Backbench (2022–2025) ===
From 28 July 2022 to 28 March 2025, he served on the House of Representatives Standing Committee on Economics and the Joint Standing Committee on Electoral Matters. He also served on the Joint Statutory Committee on Public Accounts and Audit from 28 July 2022 to 22 June 2023 and from 1 August 2023 to 28 March 2025, and on the Joint Select Committee on Social Media and Australian Society from 16 May to 18 November 2024.

==== Interjection allegation ====
In March 2023, Rae was accused of interjecting "At least I have my own children" during a parliamentary contribution from the openly-lesbian member for Moncrieff, Angie Bell during a childcare debate. Rae strenuously denied the accusation. The member for Reid, Sally Sitou, and member for Parramatta, Andrew Charlton—who were in the chamber at the time of the alleged incident—strongly supported Rae's version of events.

On the ABC's Insiders program that aired the weekend of the incident, contributor Niki Savva noted "over the past few weeks, the Liberal party has been trying to construct a narrative of bullying by Labor MPs against Liberal women and often the claims that have been made have been misleading or exaggerated." Bell lodged a formal complaint about the incident to the Speaker, but no findings were made.

=== Minister (2025–present) ===
After the Albanese government was re-elected in the 2025 federal election, Rae was appointed to the second Albanese ministry as the Minister for Aged Care and Seniors within the Department of Health and Aged Care.

== Personal life ==
Rae lives in Ballan with his partner Zoe and their three children.

Parliament of Australia
New seat	Member for Hawke; 2022–present	Incumbent
Political offices
Preceded by Anika Wells	Minister for Aged Care and Seniors; 2025–present	Incumbent
