= Anika Wells =

Australian politician (born 1985)

The Honourable Anika Wells MP
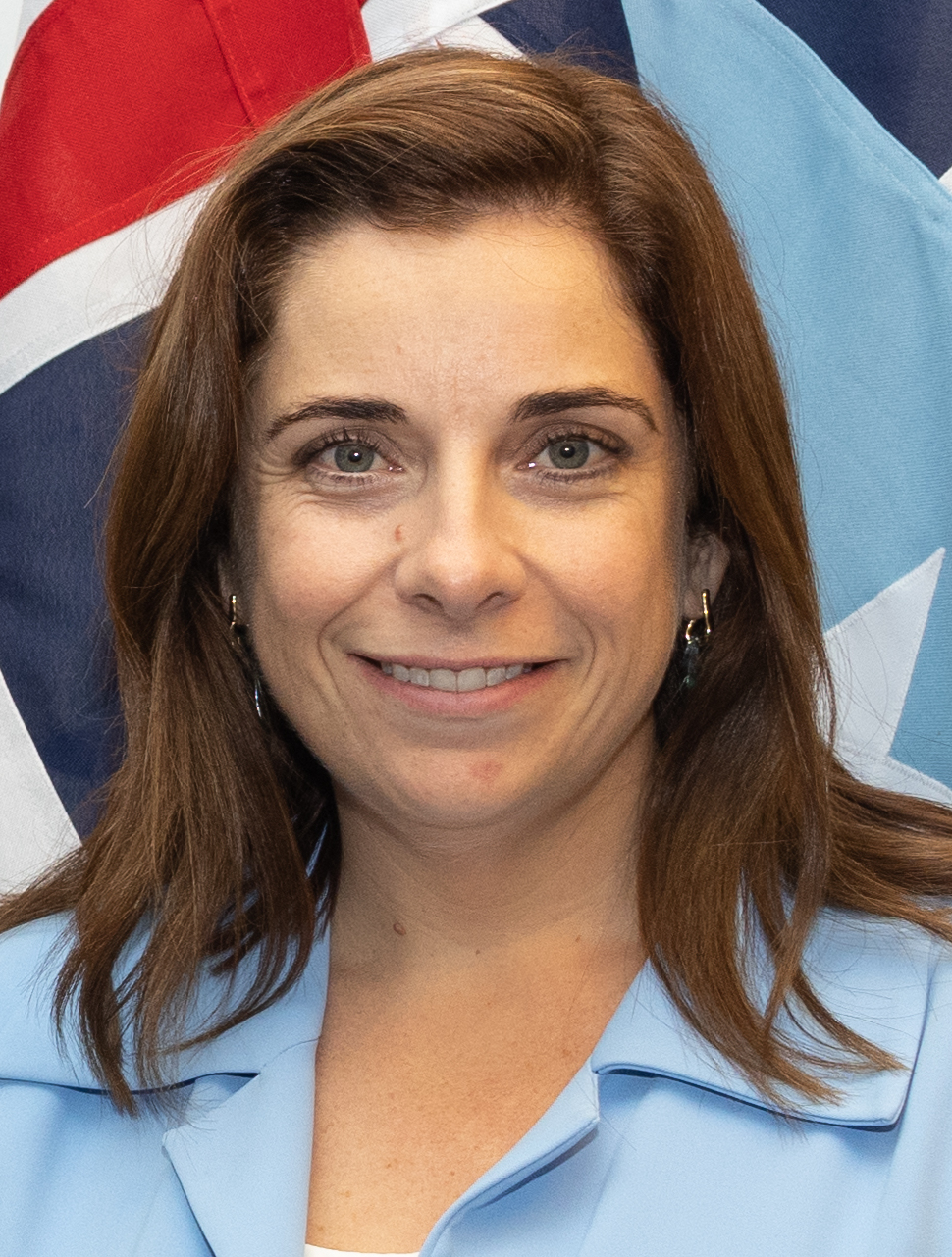

Minister for Communications
- Incumbent
- Assumed office 13 May 2025
- Prime Minister: Anthony Albanese
- Preceded by: Michelle Rowland

Minister for Sport
- Incumbent
- Assumed office 1 June 2022
- Prime Minister: Anthony Albanese
- Preceded by: Richard Colbeck

Minister for Aged Care
- In office 1 June 2022 – 13 May 2025
- Prime Minister: Anthony Albanese
- Preceded by: Richard Colbeck
- Succeeded by: Sam Rae

Member of Parliament for Lilley
- Incumbent
- Assumed office 18 May 2019
- Preceded by: Wayne Swan

Personal details
- Born: Anika Shay Wells; 11 August 1985 (age 41) South Brisbane, Queensland, Australia
- Party: Labor
- Children: 3
- Education: Griffith University; Australian National University
- Website: www.anikawells.com.au

Anika Shay Wells (born 11 August 1985) is an Australian politician. As of October 2026 she is Minister for Communications and Minister for Sport in the Albanese government, having previously served as Minister for Aged Care from 2022 to 2025. She is a member of the Australian Labor Party (ALP) and has served in the House of Representatives since the 2019 federal election, representing the Division of Lilley in Queensland. She played a significant role in the development of the Online Safety Amendment (Social Media Minimum Age) Act 2024, which was enacted by the following year.

She was a lawyer and political advisor prior to entering parliament.

== Early life and education ==
Anika Shay Wells was born in Brisbane, Queensland, on 11 August 1985. Her father, an accountant, was born in Melbourne and her mother, an administrator, was born in New Zealand. As a result, Wells held New Zealand citizenship by descent until February 2018, when she renounced it to stand for parliament.

Wells attended Robertson State School and Moreton Bay College, where she was school captain. After graduating she took a gap year in France, living in Saint-Gilles-Croix-de-Vie and studying French. She later worked part-time at the residential aged-care facility where her mother worked. Wells went on to study arts and law at Griffith University, where she was active in Young Labor. She later completed a graduate diploma in legal practice from the Australian National University.

She had initially intended to enter the diplomatic service, hoping to use her French-language skills, but after meeting Bill Shorten at a Labor campaign event in 2006, decided to pursue a career in politics.

== Career ==
Prior to entering politics, Wells worked as an adviser to the federal government for five years. She was admitted to practise law in 2012 and joined Maurice Blackburn in 2014 as a compensation lawyer. She worked on a number of cases related to immigration detention.

== Politics ==
=== Opposition (2019–2022) ===
In March 2018, Wells won Labor preselection for the Division of Lilley, replacing the retiring member Wayne Swan. She won the seat at the 2019 federal election despite a five-point swing against the ALP on the two-party-preferred count. At the time, Wells was Australia's youngest female MP at 34. Wells has stated that the election of Donald Trump as US President in 2016 and the subsequent Women’s Marches motivated her to run for elected office.

Wells served on the "Inquiry into the destruction of 46,000-year-old caves at the Juukan Gorge in the Pilbara region of Western Australia", which delivered its report “Never Again” in December 2020.

During her first term Wells received negative media attention from the Australian for placing junior members of her staff on recurring month-long casual contracts despite being a critic of casualisation of the work force.

=== Albanese government (2022–present) ===
Wells went into the May 2022 federal election on a margin of 0.6 per cent in Lilley but emerged with a first preference swing toward Labor of 6.48 per cent. The election of a federal Labor government precipitated her elevation to the ministry. Wells is a member of Queensland's Labor Right and the party's rules on affirmative action meant Blair MP Shayne Neumann was relegated to the backbench after serving on the shadow frontbench according to media reporting. On 31 May Prime Minister Anthony Albanese announced his ministry. Wells was named Minister for Aged Care and Minister for Sport. In June 2023, Wells established a new task force looking into the creation of a taxpayer levy or other funding solutions to raise more money for aged care facilities. The system costs tax payers over $30 billion a year.

Wells held her seat in the 2025 federal election. In the second Albanese ministry, she continued as Minister for Sport and was appointed as Minister for Communications, while succeeded as Minister for Aged Care and Seniors by Sam Rae.

As communications minister, Wells was tasked with implementing the government's ban on social media for children under the age of 16. In July 2025, she published the Online Safety (Age-Restricted Social Media Platforms) Rules 2025 which specifies exactly which types of social media platforms will be banned for users under the age of 16 unless they take steps to verify their age. Wells included YouTube in the list of proscribed platforms, although it had previously been excluded from the ban by her predecessor Michelle Rowland. She has described the ban as "saving Generation Alpha, who will grow up in Australia before ever going online or ever going onto social media".

== Recognition ==
On 30 September 2026 Wells was listed as one of Time magazine’s "world’s most influential rising stars", for her role in tackling the power of big tech companies and in implementing Australia’s world-leading social media ban for children under 16.

== Entitlements controversy ==
In December 2025, Wells was the subject of significant media attention over her use of parliamentary travel entitlements. Initial scrutiny focused on a trip she made to New York City to promote the government's social media ban, which cost nearly $95,000 for three return flights due to a last-minute booking. Later reports focused on the use of various entitlements to pay for flights for her family to sporting events, attendance at other social events, and the use of the government car for personal use. Her claims were within Independent Parliamentary Expenses Authority guidelines, but were perceived as conflicting with the government's focus on cost of living measures.

On 8 May 2026, Wells repaid A$10,116 following an investigation by the Independent Parliamentary Expenses Authority, which found that she had broken travel rules four times, including a time to see the 2025 AFL Grand Final.

== Personal life ==
Wells is married to government relations specialist Finn McCarthy. She had one daughter when she entered parliament, and gave birth to twin sons in 2020.

== Electoral history ==
House of Representatives
Year	Electorate	Party	First preference result				Two candidate result			
Year	Electorate	Party	Votes	%	±%	Position	Votes	%	±%	Result
2019	Lilley	Labor	34,434	35.64	▼8.12	Second	48,917	50.64	▼5.04	Elected
2022	Lilley	Labor	41,424	41.84	▲6.20	First	59,941	60.54	▲9.90	Elected
2025	Lilley	Labor	48,582	46.08	▲4.24	First	68,030	64.52	▲3.98	Elected

Australian House of Representatives
Preceded by Wayne Swan	Member for Lilley; 2019–present	Incumbent
Political offices
Preceded by Michelle Rowland	Minister for Communications; 2025–present	Incumbent
Preceded by Richard Colbeck	Minister for Sport; 2022–present	Incumbent
Preceded by Richard Colbeck	Minister for Aged Care; 2022–2025	Succeeded by Sam Rae
