= Division of Hawke =

Australian federal electoral division

Hawke Australian House of Representatives Division
- Interactive map of electorate boundaries from the 2025 federal election
- Created: 2022
- MP: Sam Rae
- Party: Labor
- Namesake: Bob Hawke
- Electors: 118,830 (2025)
- Area: 1,986 km^{2} (766.8 sq mi)
- Demographic: Provincial
- Coordinates: 37°38′31″S 144°29′6″E

The Division of Hawke is an Australian electoral division in the state of Victoria, which was contested for the first time at the 2022 Australian federal election. The electorate is centred on the localities of Bacchus Marsh, Ballan, Melton and Sunbury to the west and north-west of Melbourne.

== Geography ==
Federal electoral division boundaries in Australia are determined at redistributions by a redistribution committee appointed by the Australian Electoral Commission. Redistributions occur for the boundaries of divisions in a particular state, and they occur every seven years, or sooner if a state's representation entitlement changes or when divisions of a state are malapportioned.

== History ==
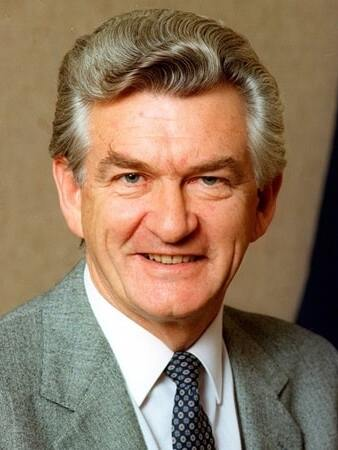
Bob Hawke, the division's namesake

The division was proposed by the Australian Electoral Commission (AEC) in March 2021, which would combine several areas from the divisions of Ballarat, Gorton and McEwen to create the new federal division, to take account of the increase in population of Victoria. The seat was named in honour of Bob Hawke, the longest-serving Labor Prime Minister of Australia, who served from March 1983 to December 1991, and who represented the Division of Wills from 1980 to 1992. The new division was confirmed in June 2021 and was contested for the first time at the 2022 election.

== Members ==
Image	Member	Party	Term	Notes
	Sam Rae (1986–)	Labor	21 May 2022 – present	Incumbent. Currently a minister under Albanese

== Election results ==
2025 Australian federal election: Hawke
Party	Candidate	Votes	%	±%
Labor	Sam Rae	40,619	39.13	+2.40
Liberal	Simmone Cottom	31,383	30.23	+3.88
Greens	Sarah Newman	10,178	9.80	+0.87
One Nation	Matthew Katselis	10,035	9.67	+4.08
Legalise Cannabis	Devon Starbuck	5,177	4.99	+4.99
Family First	Melanie Milutinovic	4,356	4.20	+4.20
Animal Justice	Fiona Adin-James	2,069	1.99	+1.99
Total formal votes		103,817	95.91	+4.05
Informal votes		4,431	4.09	−4.05
Turnout		108,248	91.13	+7.84
Two-party-preferred result
Labor	Sam Rae	59,830	57.63	+0.01
Liberal	Simmone Cottom	43,987	42.37	−0.01
Labor hold		Swing	+0.01	
