= Howard ministry =

Howard ministry may refer to:

- First Howard ministry
- Second Howard ministry
- Third Howard ministry
- Fourth Howard ministry
