= Beazley shadow ministry (1996–2001) =

The Shadow Ministry of Kim Beazley was the opposition Australian Labor Party shadow ministry of Australia from 19 March 1996 to November 2001, opposing John Howard's Coalition ministry.

The shadow cabinet is a group of senior Opposition spokespeople who form an alternative Cabinet to the government's, whose members shadow or mark each individual Minister or portfolio of the Government.

Kim Beazley became Leader of the Opposition upon his election as leader of the Australian Labor Party on 19 March 1996, and appointed his first Shadow Cabinet.

== Shadow Ministry (March 1996 to October 1998) ==
The following were members of the Shadow Cabinet:

Shadow Minister	Portfolio
Kim Beazley MP	Leader of the Opposition
Gareth Evans MP	Deputy Leader of the Opposition; Shadow Treasurer
Senator John Faulkner	Leader of the Opposition in the Senate; Shadow Minister for Social Security (to 27 March 1997); Shadow Minister for Public Administration and Government Services (27 March 1997 to 26 August 1997); Shadow Minister for Public Administration, Government Services and Territories (from 26 August 1997)
Senator Nick Sherry	Deputy Leader of the Opposition in the Senate (to 7 October 1997); Shadow Minister for Finance and Superannuation (to 27 March 1997); Assistant Shadow Treasurer and Shadow Minister for Superannuation and Business Regulation (27 March 1997 to 26 August 1997); Shadow Minister for Finance, Superannuation and Business Regulation (26 August 1997 to 7 October 1997)
Peter Baldwin MP	Shadow Minister for Education and Youth Affairs (to 27 March 1997); Shadow Minister for Finance (27 March 1997 to 26 August 1997)
Arch Bevis MP	Shadow Minister for Defence
Senator Nick Bolkus	Shadow Attorney-General; Shadow Minister for Justice
Laurie Brereton MP	Shadow Minister for Foreign Affairs
Senator Bob Collins	Shadow Minister for Primary Industries, Northern Australia and Territories (to 27 March 1997); Shadow Minister for Northern Australia and Territories (27 March 1997 to 26 August 1997)
Senator Peter Cook	Deputy Leader of the Opposition in the Senate (from 21 October 1997); Shadow Minister for Commerce and Small Business (to 27 March 1997); Shadow Minister for Trade (from 27 March 1997)
Simon Crean MP	Shadow Minister for Industry and Regional Development
Martyn Evans MP	Shadow Minister for Science and Information Technology
Laurie Ferguson MP	Shadow Minister for Administrative Services (to 27 March 1997); Shadow Minister for Veterans' Affairs, Defence Science and Personnel (from 27 March 1997)
Martin Ferguson MP	Shadow Minister for Employment and Training (to 26 August 1997); Shadow Minister for Employment, Training, Population and Immigration, Assistant to the Leader on Multicultural Affairs (from 26 August 1997)
Duncan Kerr MP	Shadow Minister for Immigration (to 27 March 1997); Shadow Minister for Population and Immigration (27 March 1997 to 26 August 1997); Assistant to the Leader of the Opposition on Multicultural Affairs (to 26 August 1997); Shadow Minister for the Environment (from 22 April 1997)
Mark Latham MP	Shadow Minister for Competition Policy, Assistant to the Shadow Treasurer, Local Government (to 27 March 1997); Shadow Minister for Education and Youth Affairs (from 27 March 1997)
Carmen Lawrence MP	Shadow Minister for Environment, the Arts, Status of Women (to 21 April 1997)
Michael Lee MP	Shadow Minister for Health
Bob McMullan MP	Shadow Minister for Industrial Relations, Public Service Matters; Shadow Minister for the Arts (from 21 April 1997)
Jenny Macklin MP	Shadow Minister for the Aged, Family and Community Services. Social Security (from 27 March 1997)
Stephen Martin MP	Shadow Minister for Sport, Veterans' Affairs (to 27 March 1997); Shadow Minister for Small Business and Customs (from 27 March 1997)
Daryl Melham MP	Shadow Minister for Aboriginal and Torres Strait Islander Affairs
Senator Belinda Neal	Shadow Minister for Consumer Affairs.; Shadow Minister for Local Government, Housing, Childcare (from 27 March 1997); Shadow Minister for Status of Women (from 21 April 1997).
Neil O'Keefe MP	Shadow Minister for Resources and Energy (to 27 March 1997); Shadow Minister for Primary Industries (from 27 March 1997)
Senator Chris Schacht	Shadow Minister for Communications
Stephen Smith MP	Shadow Minister for Trade (to 27 March 1997); Shadow Minister for Resources and Energy (from 27 March 1997)
Lindsay Tanner MP	Shadow Minister for Transport

== Shadow Ministry (October 1998 to November 2001) ==
=== Shadow Cabinet ===
Shadow Minister	Portfolio
Kim Beazley MP	Leader of the Opposition
Simon Crean MP	Deputy Leader of the Opposition; Shadow Treasurer
Senator John Faulkner	Leader of the Opposition in the Senate; Shadow Minister for Public Administration, Government Services, Olympic co-ordination, Centenary of Federation
Senator Peter Cook	Deputy Leader of the Opposition in the Senate; Shadow Minister for Trade
Arch Bevis MP	Shadow Minister for Industrial Relations
Senator Nick Bolkus	Shadow Minister for Environment and Heritage
Laurie Brereton MP	Shadow Minister for Foreign Affairs
Martyn Evans MP	Shadow Minister for Science and Resources
Laurie Ferguson MP	Shadow Minister for Defence Science & Personnel, Forestry and Conservation
Martin Ferguson MP	Shadow Minister for Employment, Training and Population
Duncan Kerr MP	Shadow Minister for Justice, Customs, Arts
Michael Lee MP	Shadow Minister for Education
Bob McMullan MP	Shadow Minister for Industry and Technology
Jenny Macklin MP	Shadow Minister for Health and the Status of Women
Stephen Martin MP	Shadow Minister for Defence
Daryl Melham MP	Shadow Minister for Aboriginal and Torres Strait Islander Affairs; Shadow Minister for Reconciliation
Senator Chris Schacht	Shadow Minister for Veterans Affairs
Stephen Smith MP	Shadow Minister for Communications
Lindsay Tanner MP	Shadow Minister for Finance

=== Outer Shadow Ministry ===
Shadow Minister	Portfolio
Senator Stephen Conroy	Shadow Minister for Financial Services and Regulation
Senator Chris Evans	Shadow Minister for Family Services and the Aged
Joel Fitzgibbon MP	Shadow Minister for Small Business and Tourism
Cheryl Kernot MP	Shadow Minister for Regional Development, Infrastructure, Transport and Regional Services
Senator Kate Lundy	Shadow Minister for Sport and Youth Affairs and assisting Bob McMullan on Information Technology
Robert McClelland	Shadow Attorney-General
Senator Sue Mackay	Shadow Minister for Regional Services, Territories and Local Government
Gavan O'Connor MP	Shadow Minister for Agriculture, Fisheries and Forestry
Con Sciacca MP	Shadow Minister for Immigration, assisting the Leader of the Opposition on Multicultural Affairs
Wayne Swan MP	Shadow Minister for Family and Community Services
Kelvin Thomson MP	Shadow Assistant Treasurer

=== Parliamentary Secretaries ===
Shadow Secretary	Portfolio
Bob Horne MP	Parliamentary Secretary to Cheryl Kernot
Alan Griffin MP	Parliamentary Secretary to Jenny Macklin
Anthony Albanese MP	Parliamentary Secretary to Wayne Swan

== See also ==
- First Howard Ministry
- Second Howard Ministry
- Second Keating Ministry
- Shadow Ministry of Simon Crean
