= Rudd shadow ministry =

Australian shadow ministry (2006–2007)

Rudd Shadow Ministry
- Shadow ministry of Australia
- 10 December 2006 – 3 December 2007
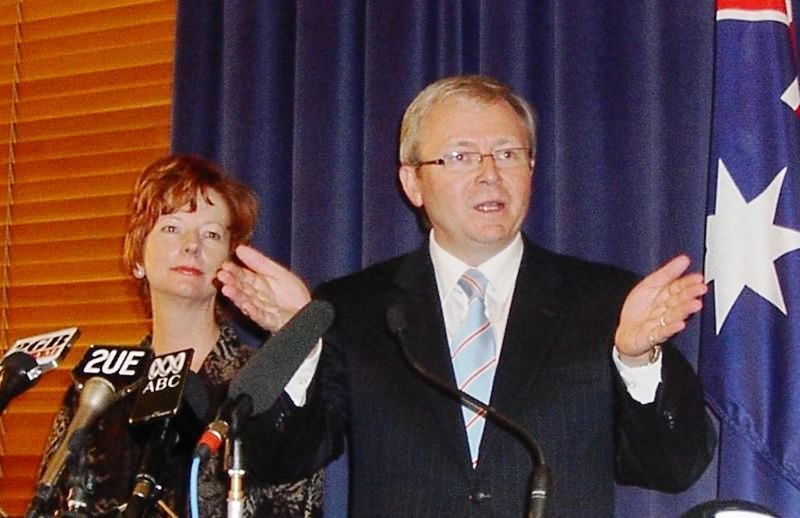
- Kevin Rudd and Julia Gillard at a press conference after being elected Labor leader and deputy leader
- Date formed: 10 December 2006
- Date dissolved: 3 December 2007

People and organisations
- Monarch: Elizabeth II
- Leader of the Opposition: Kevin Rudd
- Deputy Leader of the Opposition: Julia Gillard
- Member party: Labor Party
- Status in legislature: Official Opposition 60 / 150 (40%)

History
- Legislature term: 41st Parliament of Australia
- Incoming formation: 2006 Labor Party leadership spill
- Outgoing formation: 2007 federal election
- Predecessor: Shadow Ministry of Kim Beazley
- Successor: Shadow Ministry of Brendan Nelson

The Shadow Ministry of Kevin Rudd was the opposition Labor shadow ministry of Australia from December 2006 to December 2007, opposing John Howard's Coalition ministry. The shadow ministry was formed on 10 December 2006 after Kevin Rudd was elected party leader by the Labor caucus on 4 December, and ended with Labor's election win at the 2007 election.

== Shadow cabinet ==
This opposition made no distinction between the Shadow Cabinet and the Shadow Ministry.

The below are shadow ministers.

- Leader of the Opposition: Kevin Rudd
- Deputy Leader of the Opposition, Shadow Minister for Employment, Industrial Relations and Social Inclusion: Julia Gillard
- Leader of the Opposition in the Senate, Shadow Minister for National Development, Resources and Energy: Chris Evans
- Deputy Leader of the Opposition in the Senate, Shadow Minister for Communications and Information Technology: Stephen Conroy
- Shadow Treasurer: Wayne Swan
- Shadow Minister for Foreign Affairs: Robert McClelland
- Shadow Minister for Defence: Joel Fitzgibbon
- Shadow Minister for Finance: Lindsay Tanner
- Shadow Minister for Health: Nicola Roxon
- Shadow Attorney-General, (Note: Ludwig became Shadow Attorney-General on 9 March 2007; Kelvin Thomson was Shadow Attorney-General from 10 December 2006 to 9 March 2007.) Manager of Opposition Business in the Senate: Joe Ludwig
- Shadow Minister for Climate Change, Environment and Heritage: Peter Garrett
- Shadow Minister for Water and Infrastructure, Manager of Opposition Business in the House: Anthony Albanese
- Shadow Minister for Trade and Regional Development: Simon Crean
- Shadow Minister for Immigration, Integration and Citizenship: Tony Burke
- Shadow Minister for Education and Training: Stephen Smith
- Shadow Minister for Families and Community Services, Indigenous Affairs and Reconciliation: Jenny Macklin
- Shadow Minister for Industry, Innovation, Science and Research: Kim Carr
- Shadow Minister for Transport, Roads and Tourism: Martin Ferguson
- Shadow Minister for Primary Industries, Fisheries and Forestry: Kerry O'Brien
- Shadow Minister for Human Services and Housing, Youth, and the Status of Women: Tanya Plibersek
- Shadow Minister for Homeland Security, Territories, Shadow Minister for Justice and Customs (Note: Bevis was made Shadow Minister for Justice and Customs on 9 March 2007; Joseph Ludwig was Shadow Minister for Justice and Customs from 26 October 2004 to 9 March 2007): Arch Bevis
- Shadow Assistant Treasurer, Shadow Minister for Revenue and Competition Policy: Chris Bowen
- Shadow Minister for Service Economy, Small Business and Independent Contractors: Craig Emerson
- Shadow Minister for Multicultural Affairs, Urban Development and Consumer Affairs: Laurie Ferguson
- Shadow Minister for Veterans' Affairs, Shadow Minister for Defence Science and Personnel, Shadow Special Minister of State: Alan Griffin
- Shadow Minister for Local Government, Shadow Minister for Sport, Recreation and Health Promotion: Kate Lundy
- Shadow Minister for Ageing, Disabilities and Carers: Jan McLucas
- Shadow Minister for Federal/State Relations, Shadow Minister for International Development Assistance: Bob McMullan
- Shadow Minister for Superannuation and Intergenerational Finance, Shadow Minister for Banking and Financial Services: Nick Sherry
- Shadow Minister for Public Administration and Accountability, Shadow Minister for Corporate Governance and Responsibility, Shadow Minister for Workforce Participation: Penny Wong

=== Former shadow ministers ===
- Kelvin Thomson - Shadow Attorney-General (until 9 March 2007)

== Shadow parliamentary secretaries ==
The following were shadow parliamentary secretaries.

- Shadow Parliamentary Secretary for Foreign Affairs:Anthony Byrne
- Shadow Parliamentary Secretary for Defence and Veterans' Affairs:Graham Edwards
- Shadow Parliamentary Secretary for Environment and Heritage:Jennie George
- Shadow Parliamentary Secretary for Treasury: Catherine King
- Shadow Parliamentary Secretary for Education: Kirsten Livermore
- Shadow Parliamentary Secretary to the Leader of the Opposition:John Murphy
- Shadow Parliamentary Secretary for Industrial Relations:Brendan O'Connor
- Shadow Parliamentary Secretary for Industry and Innovation:Bernie Ripoll
- Shadow Parliamentary Secretary for Northern Australia and Indigenous Affairs:Warren Snowdon
- Shadow Parliamentary Secretary to the Leader of the Opposition (Social and Community Affairs):Ursula Stephens
