= Third Howard ministry =

62nd ministry of government of Australia

- 62nd Ministry of Australia

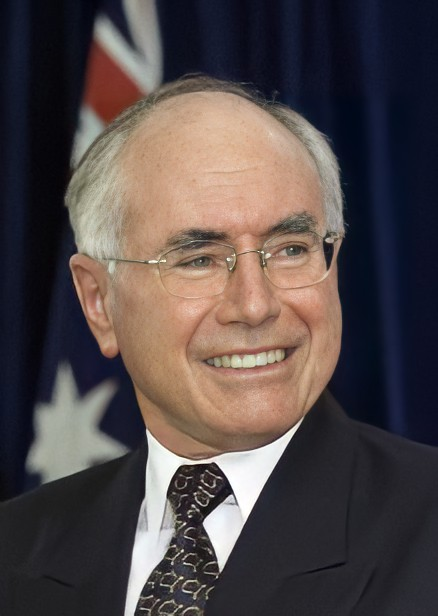
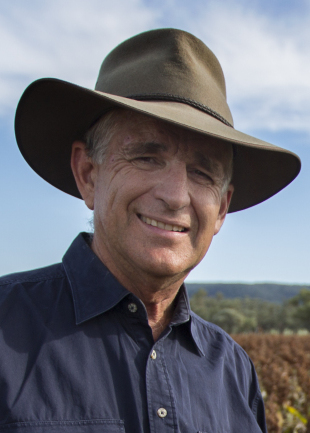
- John Howard John Anderson
- Date formed: 26 November 2001
- Date dissolved: 26 October 2004

People and organisations
- Monarch: Elizabeth II
- Governor-General: Peter Hollingworth; Michael Jeffery
- Prime Minister: John Howard
- Deputy Prime Minister: John Anderson
- No. of ministers: 34 (plus 14 Parliamentary Secretaries)
- Member party: Liberal–National coalition
- Status in legislature: Majority government
- Opposition cabinet: Crean; Latham
- Opposition party: Labor
- Opposition leader: Simon Crean; Mark Latham

History
- Election: 10 November 2001
- Outgoing election: 9 October 2004
- Legislature term: 40th
- Predecessor: Second Howard ministry
- Successor: Fourth Howard ministry

The third Howard ministry (Liberal–National coalition) was the 62nd ministry of the Government of Australia. It was led by the country's 25th prime minister, John Howard. The third Howard ministry succeeded the second Howard ministry, which dissolved on 26 November 2001 following the federal election that took place on 10 November. The ministry was replaced by the fourth Howard ministry on 26 October 2004 following the 2004 federal election.

== Cabinet ==
Party	Minister	Portrait	Portfolio
Liberal	John Howard (1939-) MP for Bennelong (1974-2007)		Prime Minister; Leader of the Liberal Party
National	John Anderson (1956–) MP for Gwydir (1989–2007)		Deputy Prime Minister; Leader of the National Party; Minister for Transport and Regional Services
Liberal	Peter Costello (1957-) MP for Higgins (1990-2009)		Deputy Leader of the Liberal Party; Treasurer
National	Mark Vaile (1956–) MP for Lyne (1993–2008)		Deputy Leader of the National Party; Minister for Trade
Liberal	Robert Hill (1946–) Senator for South Australia (1981–2006)		Leader of the Government in the Senate; Minister for Defence
Liberal	Richard Alston (1941–) Senator for Victoria (1986–2004)		Minister for Communications, Information Technology and the Arts (to 7 October 2003)
Liberal	Alexander Downer (1951–) MP for Mayo (1984–2008)		Minister for Foreign Affairs
Liberal	Tony Abbott (1957–) MP for Warringah (1994–2019)		Minister for Employment and Workplace Relations (to 7 October 2003); Minister assisting the Prime Minister for the Public Service (to 7 October 2003); Minister for Health and Ageing (from 7 October 2003); Leader of the House
Liberal	Philip Ruddock (1943–) MP for Berowra (1993–2016)		Minister for Immigration and Multicultural and Indigenous Affairs (to 7 October 2003); Minister assisting the Prime Minister for Reconciliation (to 7 October 2003); Attorney-General (from 7 October 2003)
Liberal	Dr David Kemp (1941–) MP for Goldstein (1990–2004)		Minister for the Environment and Heritage (to 18 July 2004); Vice-President of the Executive Council (to 18 July 2004)
Liberal	Daryl Williams QC (1942–) MP for Tangney (1993–2004)		Attorney-General (to 7 October 2003); Minister for Communications, Information Technology and the Arts (from 7 October 2003 to 18 July 2004)
Liberal	Nick Minchin (1953–) Senator for South Australia (1993–2011)		Minister for Finance and Administration; Vice-President of the Executive Council
National	Warren Truss (1948–) MP for Wide Bay (1990–2016)		Minister for Agriculture, Fisheries and Forestry
Liberal	Amanda Vanstone (1952–) Senator for South Australia (1984–2007)		Minister for Family and Community Services (to 7 October 2003); Minister assisting the Prime Minister for the Status of Women (to 7 October 2003); Minister for Immigration and Multicultural and Indigenous Affairs (from 7 October 2003); Minister assisting the Prime Minister for Reconciliation (from 7 October 2003)
Liberal	Brendan Nelson (1958–) MP for Bradfield (1996–2009)		Minister for Education, Science, and Training
Liberal	Kay Patterson (1944–) Senator for Victoria (1987–2008)		Minister for Health and Ageing (to 7 October 2003); Minister for Family and Community Services (from 7 October 2003); Minister assisting the Prime Minister for the Status of Women (from 7 October 2003)
Liberal	Ian Macfarlane (1955–) MP for Groom (1998–2016)		Minister for Industry, Tourism and Resources
Liberal	Kevin Andrews (1955–2024) MP for Menzies (1991–2022) (in Cabinet from 7 October 2003)		Minister for Ageing (to 7 October 2003); Minister for Employment and Workplace Relations (from 7 October 2003); Minister assisting the Prime Minister for the Public Service (from 7 October 2003)
Liberal	Helen Coonan (1947–) Senator for New South Wales (1996–2011) (in Cabinet from 18 July 2004)		Minister for Revenue and Assistant Treasurer (to 18 July 2004); Minister for Communications, Information Technology and the Arts (from 18 July 2004)
Liberal	Ian Campbell (1959–) Senator for Western Australia (1990–2007) (in Cabinet from 18 July 2004)		Parliamentary Secretary to the Treasurer (to 7 October 2003); Minister for Local Government, Territories and Roads (from 7 October 2003 to 18 July 2004); Minister for the Environment and Heritage (from 18 July 2004); Manager of Government Business in the Senate

== Outer ministry ==
Party	Minister	Portrait	Portfolio
Liberal	Chris Ellison (1954–) Senator for Western Australia (1993–2009)		Minister for Justice and Customs
Liberal	Ian Macdonald (1945–) Senator for Queensland (1990–2019)		Minister for Forestry and Conservation (to 14 November 2002); Minister for Fisheries, Forestry and Conservation (from 14 November 2002)
Liberal	Rod Kemp (1944–) Senator for Victoria (1990–2008)		Minister for the Arts and Sport
Liberal	Joe Hockey (1965–) MP for North Sydney (1996–2015)		Minister for Small Business and Tourism
National	Peter McGauran (1955–) MP for Gippsland (1983–2008)		Minister for Science
National	Larry Anthony (1961–) MP for Richmond (1996–2004)		Minister for Children and Youth Affairs
Liberal	Mal Brough (1961–) MP for Longman (1996–2007)		Minister for Employment Services (to 18 July 2004); Minister assisting the Minister for Defence (from 7 October 2003 to 18 July 2004); Minister for Revenue and Assistant Treasurer (from 18 July 2004)
Liberal	Eric Abetz (1958–) Senator for Tasmania (1994–2022)		Special Minister of State
Liberal	Danna Vale (1944–) MP for Hughes (1996–2010)		Minister for Veterans' Affairs; Minister assisting the Minister for Defence (to 7 October 2003)
Liberal	Gary Hardgrave (1960–) MP for Moreton (1996–2007)		Minister for Citizenship and Multicultural Affairs; Minister assisting the Prime Minister (from 7 October 2003)
Liberal	Wilson Tuckey (1935–) MP for O'Connor (1980–2010) (in ministry from 25 January 2002)		Minister for Regional Services, Territories and Local Government (from 25 January 2002 to 7 October 2003)
Liberal	Julie Bishop (1956–) MP for Curtin (1998–2019) (in ministry from 7 October 2003)		Minister for Ageing (from 7 October 2003)
Liberal	Jim Lloyd (1954–) MP for Robertson (1996–2007) (in ministry from 18 July 2004)		Chief Government Whip in the House (from 23 November 2001 to 18 July 2004); Minister for Local Government, Territories and Roads (from 18 July 2004)
Liberal	Fran Bailey (1946–) MP for McEwen (1996–2010) (in ministry from 18 July 2004)		Parliamentary Secretary to the Minister for Defence (to 18 July 2004); Minister for Employment Services (from 18 July 2004); Minister assisting the Minister for Defence (from 18 July 2004)

== Parliamentary Secretaries ==
Party	Minister	Portrait	Portfolio
Liberal	Jackie Kelly (1964–) MP for Lindsay (1996–2007)		Parliamentary Secretary to the Prime Minister
Liberal	Trish Worth (1946–) MP for Adelaide (1993–2004)		Parliamentary Secretary to the Minister for Health and Ageing
Liberal	Judith Troeth (1940–) Senator for Victoria (1993–2011)		Parliamentary Secretary to the Minister for Agriculture, Fisheries and Forestry
Liberal	Peter Slipper (1950–) MP for Fisher (1993–2013)		Parliamentary Secretary to the Minister for Finance and Administration
Liberal	Bill Heffernan (1943–) Senator for New South Wales (1996–2016)		Parliamentary Secretary to the Cabinet (to 19 March 2002)
Liberal	Sharman Stone (1951–) MP for Murray (1996–2016)		Parliamentary Secretary to the Minister for the Environment and Heritage
Liberal	Warren Entsch (1950–) MP for Leichhardt (1996–2007)		Parliamentary Secretary to the Minister for Industry, Science and Resources
National	Ron Boswell (1940–) Senator for Queensland (1983–2014)		Parliamentary Secretary to the Minister for Transport and Regional Services (to 7 October 2003)
Liberal	Chris Gallus (1943–) MP for Hindmarsh (1993–2004)		Parliamentary Secretary to the Minister for Foreign Affairs (to 7 October 2003)
Liberal	Ross Cameron (1965–) MP for Parramatta (1996–2004)		Parliamentary Secretary to the Minister for Family and Community Services (to 7 October 2003); Parliamentary Secretary to the Treasurer (from 7 October 2003)
National	De-Anne Kelly (1954–) MP for Dawson (1996–2007)		Parliamentary Secretary to the Minister for Transport and Regional Services (from 7 October 2003); Parliamentary Secretary to the Minister for Trade (from 7 October 2003)
Liberal	Christopher Pyne (1967–) MP for Sturt (1993–2019)		Parliamentary Secretary to the Minister for Family and Community Services (from 7 October 2003)
Liberal	Bruce Billson (1966–) MP for Dunkley (1996–2016)		Parliamentary Secretary to the Minister for Foreign Affairs (from 7 October 2003)
Liberal	Teresa Gambaro (1958–) MP for Petrie (1996–2007)		Parliamentary Secretary to the Minister for Defence (from 18 July 2004)

== See also ==
- First Howard ministry
- Second Howard ministry
- Fourth Howard ministry
