= Fourth Howard ministry =

63rd ministry of government of Australia

- 63rd ministry of Australia

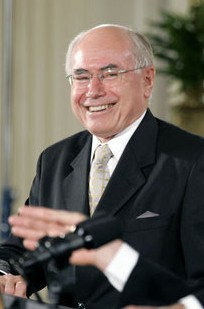
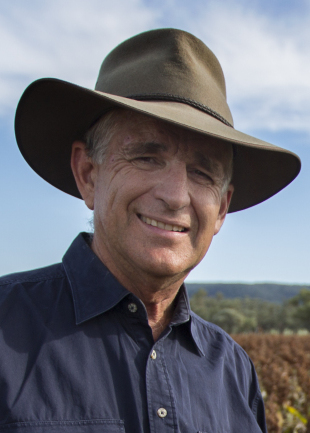
- John Howard John Anderson
- Date formed: 26 October 2004
- Date dissolved: 3 December 2007

People and organisations
- Monarch: Elizabeth II
- Governor-General: Michael Jeffery
- Prime Minister: John Howard
- Deputy Prime Minister: John Anderson; Mark Vaile
- No. of ministers: 41 (plus 12 Parliamentary Secretaries)
- Member party: Liberal–National coalition
- Status in legislature: Majority government
- Opposition cabinet: Latham; Beazley; Rudd
- Opposition party: Labor
- Opposition leader: Mark Latham; Kim Beazley; Kevin Rudd

History
- Election: 9 October 2004
- Outgoing election: 24 November 2007
- Legislature term: 41st
- Predecessor: Third Howard ministry
- Successor: First Rudd ministry

The fourth Howard ministry (Liberal–National coalition) was the 63rd ministry of the Government of Australia. It was led by the country's 25th prime minister, John Howard. The fourth Howard ministry succeeded the third Howard ministry, which dissolved on 26 October 2004 following the federal election that took place on 9 October. The ministry was replaced by the first Rudd ministry on 3 December 2007 following the federal election that took place on 24 November which saw Labor defeat the Coalition.

== Cabinet ==
Party	Minister	Portrait	Portfolio
Liberal	John Howard (1939-) MP for Bennelong (1974-2007)		Prime Minister; Leader of the Liberal Party of Australia (to 29 November 2007)
Nationals	John Anderson (1956–) MP for Gwydir (1989–2007)		Deputy Prime Minister (to 6 July 2005); Leader of the National Party (to 6 July 2005); Minister for Transport and Regional Services (to 6 July 2005)
Liberal	Peter Costello (1957-) MP for Higgins (1990-2009)		Deputy Leader of the Liberal Party (to 29 November 2007); Treasurer
Nationals	Mark Vaile (1956–) MP for Lyne (1993–2008)		Deputy Prime Minister (from 6 July 2005); Leader of the National Party (from 6 July 2005); Deputy Leader of the National Party (to 6 July 2005); Minister for Trade (to 29 September 2006); Minister for Transport and Regional Services (from 29 September 2006)
Liberal	Robert Hill (1946–) Senator for South Australia (1981–2006)		Leader of the Government in the Senate (to 20 January 2006); Minister for Defence (to 20 January 2006)
Liberal	Alexander Downer (1951–) MP for Mayo (1984–2008)		Minister for Foreign Affairs
Liberal	Tony Abbott (1957–) MP for Warringah (1994–2019)		Minister for Health and Ageing; Leader of the House
Liberal	Philip Ruddock (1943–) MP for Berowra (1993–2016)		Attorney-General
Liberal	Nick Minchin (1953–) Senator for South Australia (1993–2011)		Minister for Finance and Administration; Vice-President of the Executive Council; Leader of the Government in the Senate (from 27 January 2006)
Nationals	Warren Truss (1948–) MP for Wide Bay (1990–2016)		Deputy Leader of the National Party (from 6 July 2005); Minister for Agriculture, Fisheries and Forestry (to 6 July 2005); Minister for Transport and Regional Services (from 6 July 2005 to 29 September 2006); Minister for Trade (from 29 September 2006)
Liberal	Amanda Vanstone (1952–) Senator for South Australia (1984–2007)		Minister for Immigration and Multicultural and Indigenous Affairs (to 27 January 2006); Minister assisting the Prime Minister for Reconciliation (to 27 January 2006); Minister for Immigration and Multicultural Affairs (from 27 January 2006 to 30 January 2007)
Liberal	Brendan Nelson (1958–) MP for Bradfield (1996–2009)		Minister for Education, Science and Training (to 27 January 2006); Minister for Defence (from 27 January 2006); Leader of the Liberal Party (from 29 November 2007)
Liberal	Kay Patterson (1944–) Senator for Victoria (1987–2008)		Minister for Family and Community Services (to 27 January 2006); Minister assisting the Prime Minister for Women's Issues (to 27 January 2006)
Liberal	Ian Macfarlane (1955–) MP for Groom (1998–2016)		Minister for Industry, Tourism and Resources
Liberal	Kevin Andrews (1955–2024) MP for Menzies (1991–2022)		Minister for Employment and Workplace Relations (to 30 January 2007); Minister assisting the Prime Minister for the Public Service (to 30 January 2007); Minister for Immigration and Citizenship (from 30 January 2007)
Liberal	Helen Coonan (1947–) Senator for New South Wales (1996–2011)		Minister for Communications, Information Technology and the Arts
Liberal	Ian Campbell (1959–) Senator for Western Australia (1990–2007)		Minister for the Environment and Heritage (to 30 January 2007); Minister for Human Services (from 30 January 2007 to 9 March 2007); Manager of Government Business in the Senate (to 17 November 2004)
Nationals	Peter McGauran (1955–) MP for Gippsland (1983–2008) (in Cabinet from 6 July 2005)		Minister for Citizenship and Multicultural Affairs (to 6 July 2005); Minister for Agriculture, Fisheries and Forestry (from 6 July 2005)
Liberal	Julie Bishop (1956–) MP for Curtin (1998–2019) (in Cabinet from 27 January 2006)		Minister for Ageing (to 27 January 2006); Minister for Education, Science and Training (from 27 January 2006); Minister assisting the Prime Minister for Women's Issues (from 27 January 2006); Deputy Leader of the Liberal Party (from 29 November 2007)
Liberal	Mal Brough (1961–) MP for Longman (1996–2007) (in Cabinet from 27 January 2006)		Minister for Revenue and Assistant Treasurer (to 27 January 2006); Minister for Families, Community Services and Indigenous Affairs (from 27 January 2006)
Liberal	Malcolm Turnbull (1954–) MP for Wentworth (2004–2018) (in Cabinet from 30 January 2007)		Parliamentary Secretary to the Prime Minister (from 27 January 2006 to 30 January 2007); Minister for the Environment and Water Resources (from 30 January 2007)
Liberal	Joe Hockey (1965–) MP for North Sydney (1996–2015) (in Cabinet from 30 January 2007)		Minister for Human Services (to 30 January 2007); Minister assisting the Minister for Workplace Relations (from 10 August 2006 to 30 January 2007); Minister for Employment and Workplace Relations (from 30 January 2007); Minister assisting the Prime Minister for the Public Service (from 30 January 2007)
Liberal	Chris Ellison (1954–) Senator for Western Australia (1993–2009) (in Cabinet from 9 March 2007)		Minister for Justice and Customs (to 9 March 2007); Minister for Human Services (from 9 March 2007); Manager of Government Business in the Senate (from 17 November 2004 to 9 March 2007)

== Outer ministry ==
Party	Minister	Portrait	Portfolio
Liberal	Ian Macdonald (1945–) Senator for Queensland (1990–2019)		Minister for Fisheries, Forestry and Conservation (to 27 January 2006)
Liberal	Rod Kemp (1944–) Senator for Victoria (1990–2008)		Minister for the Arts and Sport (to 30 January 2007)
Liberal	Eric Abetz (1958–) Senator for Tasmania (1994–2022)		Special Minister of State (to 27 January 2006); Minister for Fisheries, Forestry and Conservation (from 27 January 2006); Manager of Government Business in the Senate (from 9 March 2007)
Liberal	Gary Hardgrave (1960–) MP for Moreton (1996–2007)		Minister for Vocational and Technical Education (to 30 January 2007); Minister assisting the Prime Minister (to 30 January 2007)
Liberal	Fran Bailey (1946–) MP for McEwen (1996–2010)		Minister for Small Business and Tourism
Liberal	Jim Lloyd (1954–) MP for Robertson (1996–2007)		Minister for Local Government, Territories and Roads
Nationals	De-Anne Kelly (1954–) MP for Dawson (1996–2007) (in ministry until 27 January 2006)		Minister for Veterans' Affairs (to 27 January 2006); Minister assisting the Minister for Defence (to 27 January 2006); Parliamentary Secretary to the Minister for Trade (from 27 January 2006 to 29 September 2006); Parliamentary Secretary to the Minister for Transport and Regional Services (from 29 September 2006)
Liberal	Peter Dutton (1970–) MP for Dickson (2001–2025)		Minister for Workforce Participation (to 27 January 2006); Minister for Revenue and Assistant Treasurer (from 27 January 2006)
Nationals	John Cobb (1950–) MP for Parkes (2001–2007) (in ministry from 6 July 2005)		Parliamentary Secretary to the Minister for Transport and Regional Services (to 6 July 2005); Minister for Citizenship and Multicultural Affairs (from 6 July 2005 to 27 January 2006); Minister for Community Services (from 27 January 2006 to 30 January 2007); Assistant Minister for the Environment and Water Resources (from 30 January 2007)
Liberal	Bruce Billson (1966–) MP for Dunkley (1996–2016) (in ministry from 27 January 2006)		Parliamentary Secretary for Foreign Affairs and Trade (to 6 July 2005); Parliamentary Secretary to the Minister for Foreign Affairs (from 6 July 2005 to 27 January 2006); Parliamentary Secretary to the Minister for Immigration and Multicultural and Indigenous Affairs (from 6 July 2005 to 27 January 2006); Minister for Veterans' Affairs (from 27 January 2006); Minister assisting the Minister for Defence (from 27 January 2006)
Liberal	Gary Nairn (1951–2024) MP for Eden-Monaro (1996–2007) (in ministry from 27 January 2006)		Parliamentary Secretary to the Prime Minister (to 27 January 2006); Special Minister of State (from 27 January 2006)
Liberal	Sharman Stone (1951–) MP for Murray (1996–2016) (in ministry from 27 January 2006)		Parliamentary Secretary to the Minister for Finance and Administration (to 27 January 2006); Minister for Workforce Participation (from 27 January 2006)
Liberal	Santo Santoro (1956–) Senator for Queensland (2002–2007) (in ministry from 27 January 2006)		Minister for Ageing (from 27 January 2006 to 21 March 2007)
Liberal	Andrew Robb (1951–) MP for Goldstein (2004–2016) (in ministry from 30 January 2007)		Parliamentary Secretary to the Minister for Immigration and Multicultural Affairs (from 27 January 2006 to 30 January 2007); Minister for Vocational and Technical Education (from 30 January 2007)
Country Liberal	Nigel Scullion (1956–) Senator for Northern Territory (2001–2019) (in ministry from 30 January 2007)		Minister for Community Services (from 30 January 2007)
Liberal	George Brandis SC (1957–) Senator for Queensland (2000–2018) (in ministry from 30 January 2007)		Minister for the Arts and Sport (from 30 January 2007)
Liberal	David Johnston (1956–) Senator for Western Australia (2002–2016) (in ministry from 9 March 2007)		Minister for Justice and Customs (from 9 March 2007)
Liberal	Christopher Pyne (1967–) MP for Sturt (1993–2019) (in ministry from 21 March 2007)		Parliamentary Secretary to the Minister for Health and Ageing (to 30 January 2007); Assistant Minister for Health and Ageing (from 30 January 2007 to 21 March 2007); Minister for Ageing (from 21 March 2007)

== Parliamentary Secretaries ==
Party	Minister	Portrait	Portfolio
Liberal	Warren Entsch (1950–) MP for Leichhardt (1996–2007)		Parliamentary Secretary to the Minister for Industry, Science and Resources (to 27 January 2006)
Liberal	Teresa Gambaro (1958–) MP for Petrie (1996–2007)		Parliamentary Secretary to the Minister for Defence (to 27 January 2006); Parliamentary Secretary to the Minister for Foreign Affairs (from 27 January 2006 to 30 January 2007); Parliamentary Secretary to the Minister for Immigration and Citizenship (from 30 January 2007 to 21 March 2007); Assistant Minister for Immigration and Citizenship (from 21 March 2007)
Liberal	Chris Pearce (1963–) MP for Aston (2001–2010)		Parliamentary Secretary to the Treasurer
Liberal	Greg Hunt (1965–) MP for Flinders (2001–2022)		Parliamentary Secretary to the Minister for the Environment and Heritage (to 30 January 2007); Parliamentary Secretary to the Minister for Foreign Affairs (from 30 January 2007)
Liberal	Sussan Ley (1961–) MP for Farrer (2001–2026)		Parliamentary Secretary to the Minister for Family and Community Services (Children and Youth Affairs) (to 27 January 2006); Parliamentary Secretary to the Minister for Agriculture, Fisheries and Forestry (from 27 January 2006)
Liberal	Pat Farmer (1962–) MP for Macarthur (2001–2010)		Parliamentary Secretary to the Minister for Education, Science and Training
Liberal	Richard Colbeck (1958–) Senator for Tasmania (2002–2016)		Parliamentary Secretary to the Minister for Agriculture, Fisheries and Forestry (to 27 January 2006); Parliamentary Secretary to the Minister for Finance and Administration (from 27 January 2006)
Nationals	Sandy Macdonald (1954–) Senator for New South Wales (2000–2008)		Parliamentary Secretary to the Minister for Trade (from 6 July 2005 to 27 January 2006); Parliamentary Secretary to the Minister for Defence (from 27 January 2006 to 30 January 2007)
Liberal	Bob Baldwin (1955–) MP for Paterson (2001–2016)		Parliamentary Secretary to the Minister for Industry, Tourism and Resources (from 27 January 2006)
Liberal	Tony Smith (1967–) MP for Casey (2001–2022)		Parliamentary Secretary to the Prime Minister (from 30 January 2007)
Liberal	Peter Lindsay (1944–) MP for Herbert (1996–2010)		Parliamentary Secretary to the Minister for Defence (from 30 January 2007)
Liberal	Brett Mason (1962–) Senator for Queensland (1999–2015)		Parliamentary Secretary for Health and Ageing (from 21 March 2007)

== See also ==
- First Howard ministry
- Second Howard ministry
- Third Howard ministry
- First Rudd ministry
- Shadow Ministry of Brendan Nelson
