= Second Howard ministry =

61st ministry of government of Australia

- 61st Ministry of Australia

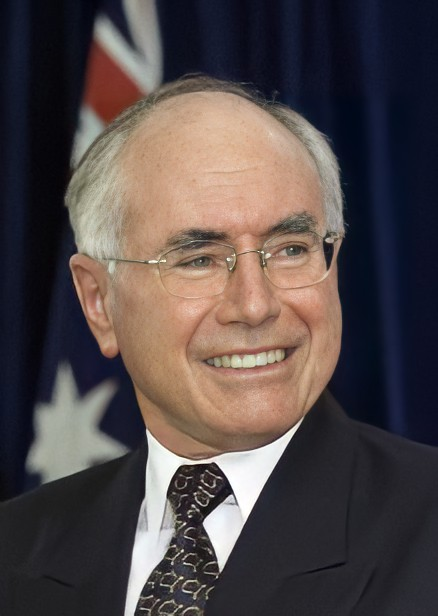
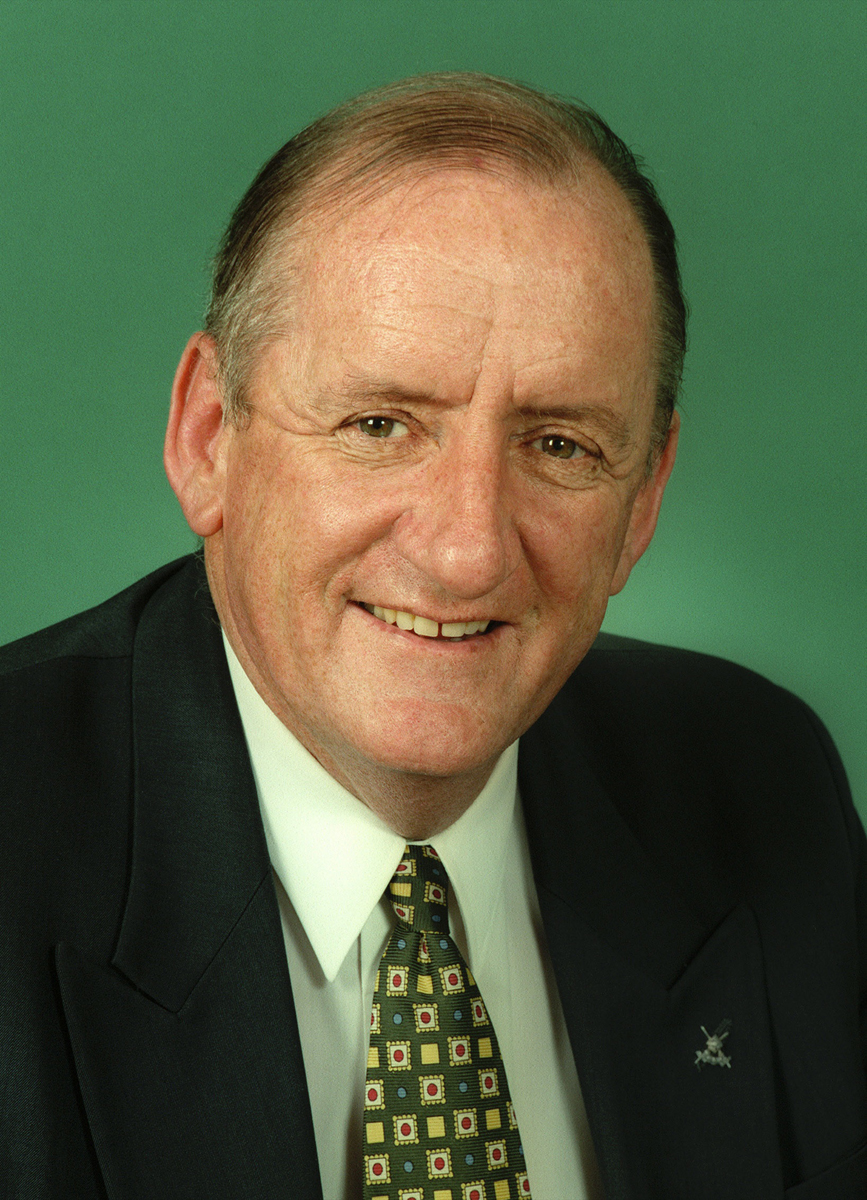
- John Howard Tim Fischer
- Date formed: 21 October 1998
- Date dissolved: 26 November 2001

People and organisations
- Monarch: Elizabeth II
- Governor-General: Sir William Deane; Peter Hollingworth
- Prime Minister: John Howard
- Deputy Prime Minister: Tim Fischer; John Anderson
- No. of ministers: 34 (plus 13 Parliamentary Secretaries)
- Member party: Liberal–National coalition
- Status in legislature: Majority government
- Opposition party: Labor
- Opposition leader: Kim Beazley

History
- Election: 3 October 1998
- Outgoing election: 10 November 2001
- Legislature term: 39th
- Predecessor: First Howard ministry
- Successor: Third Howard ministry

The second Howard ministry (Liberal–National coalition) was the 61st ministry of the Government of Australia. It was led by the country's 25th prime minister, John Howard. The second Howard ministry succeeded the first Howard ministry, which dissolved on 21 October 1998 following the federal election that took place on 3 October. The ministry was replaced by the third Howard ministry on 10 November 2001 following the 2001 federal election.

== Cabinet ==
Party	Minister	Portrait	Portfolio
Liberal	John Howard (1939-) MP for Bennelong (1974-2007)		Prime Minister; Leader of the Liberal Party
national	Tim Fischer (1946–2019) MP for Farrer (1984–2001)		Deputy Prime Minister (to 20 July 1999); Leader of the National Party (to 20 July 1999); Minister for Trade (to 20 July 1999)
Liberal	Peter Costello (1957-) MP for Higgins (1990-2009)		Deputy Leader of the Liberal Party; Treasurer
national	John Anderson (1956–) MP for Gwydir (1989–2007)		Deputy Prime Minister (from 20 July 1999); Leader of the National Party (from 20 July 1999); Deputy Leader of the National Party (to 20 July 1999); Minister for Transport and Regional Services
Liberal	Robert Hill (1946–) Senator for South Australia (1981–2006)		Leader of the Government in the Senate; Minister for the Environment and Heritage
Liberal	Richard Alston (1941–) Senator for Victoria (1986–2004)		Minister for Communications, Information Technology and the Arts
Liberal	Peter Reith (1950–2022) MP for Flinders (1984–2001)		Minister for Employment, Workplace Relations and Small Business (to 30 January 2001); Minister for Defence (from 30 January 2001); Leader of the House
Liberal	Jocelyn Newman (1937–2018) Senator for Tasmania (1986–2002)		Minister for Family and Community Services (to 30 January 2001); Minister assisting the Prime Minister for the Status of Women (to 30 January 2001)
Liberal	Alexander Downer (1951–) MP for Mayo (1984–2008)		Minister for Foreign Affairs
Liberal	John Moore (1936–2025) MP for Ryan (1975–2001)		Minister for Defence (to 30 January 2001)
Liberal	Michael Wooldridge (1956–) MP for Casey (1998–2001)		Minister for Health and Aged Care
Liberal	John Fahey (1945–2020) MP for Macarthur (1996–2001)		Minister for Finance and Administration
Liberal	David Kemp (1941–) MP for Goldstein (1990–2004)		Minister for Education, Training and Youth Affairs; Vice-President of the Executive Council; Minister assisting the Prime Minister for the Public Service
Liberal	Daryl Williams QC (1942–) MP for Tangney (1993–2004)		Attorney-General
national	Mark Vaile (1956–) MP for Lyne (1993–2008)		Deputy Leader of the National Party (from 1 July 1999); Minister for Agriculture, Fisheries and Forestry (to 20 July 1999); Minister for Trade (from 20 July 1999)
Liberal	Philip Ruddock (1943–) MP for Berowra (1993–2016)		Minister for Immigration and Multicultural Affairs; Minister assisting the Prime Minister for Reconciliation (to 30 January 2001); Minister for Reconciliation and Aboriginal and Torres Strait Islander Affairs (from 30 January 2001)
Liberal	Nick Minchin (1953–) Senator for South Australia (1993–2011)		Minister for Industry, Science and Resources
national	Warren Truss (1948–) MP for Wide Bay (1990–2016) (in Cabinet from 20 July 1999)		Minister for Community Services (to 20 July 1999); Minister for Agriculture, Fisheries and Forestry (from 20 July 1999)
Liberal	Amanda Vanstone (1952–) Senator for South Australia (1984–2007) (in Cabinet from 30 January 2001)		Minister for Justice and Customs (to 30 January 2001); Minister for Family and Community Services (from 30 January 2001); Minister assisting the Prime Minister for the Status of Women (from 30 January 2001)
Liberal	Tony Abbott (1957–) MP for Warringah (1994–2019) (in Cabinet from 30 January 2001)		Minister for Employment Services (to 30 January 2001); Minister for Employment, Workplace Relations and Small Business (from 30 January 2001)

== Outer ministry ==
Party	Minister	Portrait	Portfolio
Liberal	Bronwyn Bishop (1942–) MP for Mackellar (1994–2016)		Minister for Aged Care
national	Bruce Scott (1943–) MP for Maranoa (1990–2016)		Minister for Veterans' Affairs; Minister assisting the Minister for Defence
Liberal	John Herron (1932–2019) Senator for Queensland (1990–2002)		Minister for Aboriginal and Torres Strait Islander Affairs (to 30 January 2001)
Liberal	Rod Kemp (1944–) Senator for Victoria (1990–2008)		Assistant Treasurer
Liberal	Chris Ellison (1954–) Senator for Western Australia (1993–2009)		Special Minister of State (to 30 January 2001); Minister for Justice and Customs (from 30 January 2001)
Liberal	Joe Hockey (1965–) MP for North Sydney (1996–2015)		Minister for Financial Services and Regulation
Liberal	Jackie Kelly (1964–) MP for Lindsay (1996–2007)		Minister for Sport and Tourism; Minister assisting the Prime Minister for the Sydney 2000 Games
Liberal	Ian Macdonald (1945–) Senator for Queensland (1990–2019)		Minister for Regional Services, Territories and Local Government
national	Peter McGauran (1955–) MP for Gippsland (1983–2008)		Minister for the Arts and the Centenary of Federation
Liberal	Wilson Tuckey (1935–) MP for O'Connor (1980–2010)		Minister for Forestry and Conservation; Minister assisting the Prime Minister
national	Larry Anthony (1961–) MP for Richmond (1996–2004) (in ministry from 20 July 1999)		Parliamentary Secretary to the Minister for Trade (to 20 July 1999); Minister for Community Services (from 20 July 1999)
Liberal	Eric Abetz (1958–) Senator for Tasmania (1994–2022) (in ministry from 30 January 2001)		Parliamentary Secretary to the Minister for Defence (to 30 January 2001); Special Minister of State (from 30 January 2001)
Liberal	Ian Macfarlane (1955–) MP for Groom (1998–2016) (in ministry from 30 January 2001)		Minister for Small Business (from 30 January 2001)
Liberal	Mal Brough (1961–) MP for Longman (1996–2007) (in ministry from 14 February 2001)		Parliamentary Secretary to the Minister for Employment, Workplace Relations and Small Business (from 16 February 2000 to 30 January 2001); Minister for Employment Services (from 14 February 2001)

== Parliamentary Secretaries ==
Party	Minister	Portrait	Portfolio
Liberal	Ian Campbell (1959–) Senator for Western Australia (1990–2007)		Parliamentary Secretary to the Minister for Communications, Information Technology and the Arts; Manager of Government Business in the Senate
Country Liberal	Grant Tambling (1943–2025) Senator for Northern Territory (1987–2001)		Parliamentary Secretary to the Minister for Health and Aged Care
Liberal	Trish Worth (1946–) MP for Adelaide (1993–2004)		Parliamentary Secretary to the Minister for Education, Training and Youth Affairs
Liberal	Kathy Sullivan (1942–) MP for Moncrieff (1984–2001)		Parliamentary Secretary to the Minister for Foreign Affairs (to 16 February 2000)
Liberal	Judith Troeth (1940–) Senator for Victoria (1993–2011)		Parliamentary Secretary to the Minister for Agriculture, Fisheries and Forestry
Liberal	Warren Entsch (1950–) MP for Leichhardt (1996–2007)		Parliamentary Secretary to the Minister for Industry, Science and Resources
Liberal	Bill Heffernan (1943–) Senator for New South Wales (1996–2016)		Parliamentary Secretary to the Cabinet
Liberal	Kay Patterson (1944–) Senator for Victoria (1987–2008)		Parliamentary Secretary to the Minister for Immigration and Multicultural Affairs; Parliamentary Secretary to the Minister for Foreign Affairs (from 16 February 2000)
Liberal	Peter Slipper (1950–) MP for Fisher (1993–2013)		Parliamentary Secretary to the Minister for Finance and Administration
Liberal	Sharman Stone (1951–) MP for Murray (1996–2016)		Parliamentary Secretary to the Minister for the Environment and Heritage
national	Ron Boswell (1940–) Senator for Queensland (1983–2014)		Parliamentary Secretary to the Minister for Transport and Regional Services (from 20 July 1999)
Liberal	Brendan Nelson (1958–) MP for Bradfield (1996–2009)		Parliamentary Secretary to the Minister for Defence (from 30 January 2001)
Liberal	Chris Gallus (1943–) MP for Hindmarsh (1993–2004)		Parliamentary Secretary to the Minister for Reconciliation and Aboriginal and Torres Strait Islander Affairs (from 30 January 2001)

== See also ==
- First Howard ministry
- Third Howard ministry
- Fourth Howard ministry
