= First Howard ministry =

60th ministry of government of Australia

- 60th Ministry of Australia

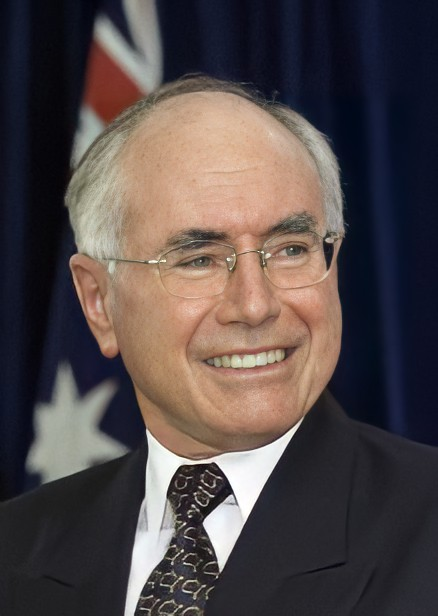
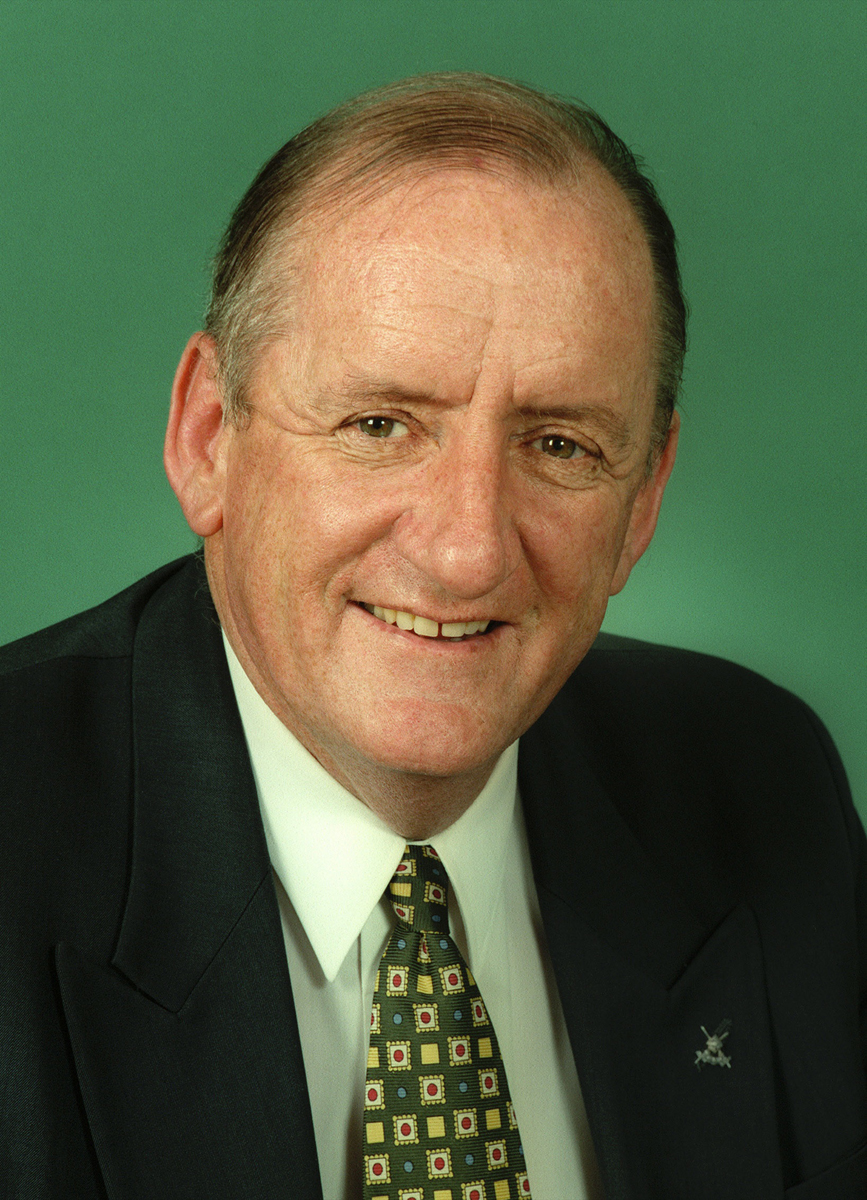
- John Howard Tim Fischer
- Date formed: 11 March 1996
- Date dissolved: 21 October 1998

People and organisations
- Monarch: Elizabeth II
- Governor-General: Sir William Deane
- Prime Minister: John Howard
- Deputy Prime Minister: Tim Fischer
- No. of ministers: 35 (plus 13 Parliamentary Secretaries)
- Member party: Liberal–National coalition
- Status in legislature: Majority government
- Opposition party: Labor
- Opposition leader: Kim Beazley

History
- Election: 2 March 1996
- Outgoing election: 3 October 1998
- Legislature term: 38th
- Predecessor: Second Keating ministry
- Successor: Second Howard ministry

The first Howard ministry (Liberal–National coalition) was the 60th ministry of the Government of Australia. It was led by the country's 25th prime minister, John Howard. The first Howard ministry succeeded the second Keating ministry, which dissolved on 11 March 1996 following the federal election that took place on 2 March 1996, which saw the Coalition defeat Paul Keating's Labor Party. The ministry was replaced by the second Howard ministry on 21 October 1998 following the 1998 federal election.

== Cabinet ==
Party	Minister	Portrait	Portfolio
Liberal	John Howard (1939–) MP for Bennelong (1974–2007)		Prime Minister; Leader of the Liberal Party
Nationals	Tim Fischer (1946–2019) MP for Farrer (1984–2001)		Deputy Prime Minister; Leader of the National Party; Minister for Trade
Liberal	Peter Costello (1957–) MP for Higgins (1990–2009)		Deputy Leader of the Liberal Party; Treasurer
Nationals	John Anderson (1956–) MP for Gwydir (1989–2007)		Deputy Leader of the National Party; Minister for Primary Industries and Energy; Minister for Transport and Regional Development (from 25 September 1997 to 9 October 1997)
Liberal	Robert Hill (1946–) Senator for South Australia (1981–2006)		Leader of the Government in the Senate; Minister for the Environment
Liberal	Richard Alston (1941–) Senator for Victoria (1986–2004)		Minister for Communications and the Arts (to 9 October 1997); Minister for Communications, the Information Economy and the Arts (from 9 October 1997)
Liberal	Peter Reith (1950–2022) MP for Flinders (1984–2001)		Minister for Industrial Relations (to 18 July 1997); Minister assisting the Prime Minister for the Public Service (from 17 March 1996 to 18 July 1997); Minister for Workplace Relations and Small Business (from 18 July 1997); Leader of the House
Liberal	Jocelyn Newman (1937–2018) Senator for Tasmania (1986–2002)		Minister for Social Security; Minister assisting the Prime Minister for the Status of Women (to 9 October 1997)
Liberal	Alexander Downer (1951–) MP for Mayo (1984–2008)		Minister for Foreign Affairs
Liberal	John Moore (1936–2025) MP for Ryan (1975–2001)		Minister for Industry, Science and Tourism; Vice-President of the Executive Council
Liberal	Ian McLachlan AO (1936–) MP for Barker (1990–1998)		Minister for Defence
Nationals	John Sharp (1954–) MP for Hume (1993–1998)		Minister for Transport and Regional Development (to 25 September 1997)
Liberal	Michael Wooldridge (1956–) MP for Chisholm (1987–1998) MP for Casey (1998–2001)		Minister for Health and Family Services
Liberal	John Fahey (1945–2020) MP for Macarthur (1996–2001)		Minister for Finance (to 9 October 1997); Minister for Finance and Administration (from 9 October 1997)
Liberal	Amanda Vanstone (1952–) Senator for South Australia (1984–2007) (in Cabinet until 9 October 1997)		Minister for Employment, Education, Training and Youth Affairs (to 9 October 1997); Minister for Justice (from 9 October 1997)
Liberal	David Kemp (1941–) MP for Goldstein (1990–2004) (in Cabinet from 9 October 1997)		Minister for Schools, Vocational Education and Training (to 9 October 1997); Minister assisting the Prime Minister for the Public Service (to 17 March 1996; from 18 July 1997); Minister assisting the Minister for Finance for Privatisation (to 9 October 1997); Minister for Employment, Education, Training and Youth Affairs (from 9 October 1997)
Nationals	Mark Vaile (1956–) MP for Lyne (1993–2008) (in Cabinet from 9 October 1997)		Minister for Transport and Regional Development (from 9 October 1997)
Liberal	Daryl Williams QC (1942–) MP for Tangney (1993–2004) (in Cabinet from 9 October 1997)		Attorney-General; Minister for Justice (to 9 October 1997)

== Outer ministry ==
Party	Minister	Portrait	Portfolio
Liberal	Philip Ruddock (1943–) MP for Berowra (1993–2016)		Minister for Immigration and Multicultural Affairs; Minister for Administrative Services (from 25 September 1997 to 9 October 1997)
National	Peter McGauran (1955–) MP for Gippsland (1983–2008)		Minister for Science and Technology (to 26 September 1997)
Liberal	Jim Short (1936–) Senator for Victoria (1984–1997)		Assistant Treasurer (to 14 October 1996)
Liberal	Warwick Parer (1936–2014) Senator for Queensland (1984–2000)		Minister for Resources and Energy
Liberal	Geoff Prosser (1948–) MP for Forrest (1987–2007)		Minister for Small Business and Consumer Affairs (to 18 July 1997)
Liberal	Judi Moylan (1944–) MP for Pearce (1993–2013)		Minister for Family Services (to 9 October 1997); Minister for the Status of Women (from 9 October 1997)
Liberal	Bronwyn Bishop (1942–) MP for Mackellar (1994–2016)		Minister for Defence Industry, Science and Personnel
Liberal	Warwick Smith (1954–) MP for Bass (1996–1998)		Minister for Sport, Territories and Local Government (to 9 October 1997); Minister assisting the Prime Minister for the Sydney 2000 Games (from 7 May 1996 to 9 October 1997); Minister for Family Services (from 9 October 1997)
National	Bruce Scott (1943–) MP for Maranoa (1990–2016)		Minister for Veterans' Affairs
Liberal	John Herron (1932–2019) Senator for Queensland (1990–2002)		Minister for Aboriginal and Torres Strait Islander Affairs
Liberal	David Jull (1944–2011) MP for Fadden (1984–2007)		Minister for Administrative Services (to 25 September 1997)
Liberal	Rod Kemp (1944–) Senator for Victoria (1990–2008) (in Ministry from 14 October 1996)		Parliamentary Secretary to the Minister for Social Security (to 14 October 1996); Assistant Treasurer (from 14 October 1996); Manager of Government Business in the Senate (to 6 November 1996)
Liberal	Chris Ellison (1954–) Senator for Western Australia (1993–2009) (in Ministry from 18 July 1997)		Parliamentary Secretary to the Attorney-General (from 13 February 1997 to 18 July 1997); Parliamentary Secretary to the Minister for Health and Family Services (from 13 February 1997 to 18 July 1997); Minister for Customs and Consumer Affairs (from 18 July 1997 to 9 October 1997); Minister assisting the Attorney-General (from 18 July 1997 to 9 October 1997); Minister for Schools, Vocational Education and Training (from 9 October 1997)
Liberal	Andrew Thomson (1961–) MP for Wentworth (1995–2001) (in Ministry from 9 October 1997)		Parliamentary Secretary to the Minister for Foreign Affairs (to 9 October 1997); Minister for Sport and Tourism (from 9 October 1997); Minister assisting the Prime Minister for the Sydney 2000 Games (from 9 October 1997)
Liberal	Nick Minchin (1953–) Senator for South Australia (1993–2011) (in Ministry from 9 October 1997)		Parliamentary Secretary to the Prime Minister (to 9 October 1997); Special Minister of State (from 9 October 1997); Minister assisting the Prime Minister (from 9 October 1997)
Liberal	Alex Somlyay (1946–) MP for Fairfax (1990–2013) (in Ministry from 9 October 1997)		Minister for Regional Development, Territories and Local Government (from 9 October 1997)
National	Warren Truss (1948–) MP for Wide Bay (1990–2016) (in Ministry from 9 October 1997)		Minister for Customs and Consumer Affairs (from 9 October 1997)

== Parliamentary Secretaries ==
Party	Minister	Portrait	Portfolio
Liberal	Tony Abbott (1957–) MP for Warringah (1994–2019)		Parliamentary Secretary to the Minister for Employment, Education, Training and Youth Affairs
Nationals	David Brownhill (1935–) Senator for New South Wales (1984–2000)		Parliamentary Secretary to the Minister for Trade; Parliamentary Secretary to the Minister for Primary Industries and Energy (to 9 October 1996)
Liberal	Ian Campbell (1959–) Senator for Western Australia (1990–2007)		Parliamentary Secretary to the Minister for the Environment (to 11 November 1996); Parliamentary Secretary to the Treasurer (from 11 November 1996); Manager of Government Business in the Senate (from 6 November 1996)
Liberal	Brian Gibson (1936–2017) Senator for Tasmania (1993–2002)		Parliamentary Secretary to the Treasurer (to 15 October 1996)
Liberal	Chris Miles (1947–) MP for Braddon (1984–1998)		Parliamentary Secretary (Cabinet) to the Prime Minister
Country Liberal	Grant Tambling (1943–2025) Senator for Northern Territory (1987–2001)		Parliamentary Secretary to the Minister for Transport and Regional Development (to 14 October 1996); Parliamentary Secretary to the Minister for Social Security (from 14 October 1996)
Liberal	Bob Woods (1947–) Senator for New South Wales (1994–1997)		Parliamentary Secretary to the Minister for Health and Family Services (to 3 February 1997)
Liberal	Michael Ronaldson (1954–) MP for Ballarat (1990–2001)		Parliamentary Secretary to the Minister for Transport and Regional Development (from 14 October 1996)
Liberal	Ian Macdonald (1945–) Senator for Queensland (1990–2019)		Parliamentary Secretary to the Minister for the Environment (from 11 November 1996)
Liberal	Alan Cadman (1937–) MP for Mitchell (1974–2007)		Parliamentary Secretary to the Minister for Workplace Relations and Small Business (from 18 July 1997)
Liberal	Trish Worth (1946–) MP for Adelaide (1993–2004)		Parliamentary Secretary to the Minister for Health and Family Services (from 18 July 1997)
Liberal	Kathy Sullivan (1942–) MP for Moncrieff (1984–2001)		Parliamentary Secretary to the Minister for Foreign Affairs (from 9 October 1997)
Liberal	Judith Troeth (1940–) Senator for Victoria (1993–2011)		Parliamentary Secretary to the Minister for Primary Industries and Energy (from 9 October 1996)

== See also ==
- Second Howard ministry
- Shadow Ministry of John Howard (1995–96)
- Second Keating ministry
- Shadow Ministry of Kim Beazley (1996–2001)
