= Minister for the Public Service (Australia) =

Australian cabinet position

- Commonwealth Coat of Arms

- Flag of Australia

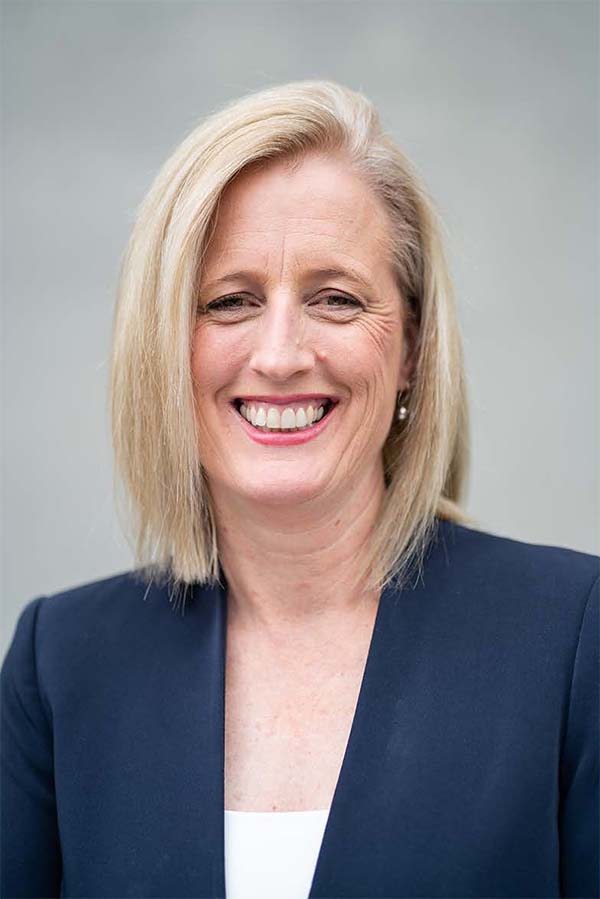
- Incumbent; Katy Gallagher since 1 June 2022
- Department of the Prime Minister and Cabinet
- Style: The Honourable
- Appointer: Governor-General on the advice of the prime minister
- Inaugural holder: Lionel Bowen (as Minister Assisting the Prime Minister in matters relating to the Public Service)
- Formation: 12 June 1974
- Website: ministers.pmc.gov.au/gallagher

The Minister for the Public Service is an Australian Government cabinet position which is currently held by Katy Gallagher following the swearing in of the full Albanese ministry on 1 June 2022.

In the Government of Australia, the minister administers this portfolio through the Department of the Prime Minister and Cabinet.

== List of ministers for the public service ==
The following individuals have been appointed as Minister for the Public Service, or any of its precedent titles:

Order	Minister	Party	Prime Minister	Title	Term start	Term end	Term in office
1	Lionel Bowen	Labor	3rd Whitlam	Minister Assisting the Prime Minister in matters relating to the Public Service	12 June 1974	6 June 1975	359 days
2	Jim McClelland	Labor	3rd Whitlam	Minister Assisting the Prime Minister in matters relating to the Public Service	6 June 1975	11 November 1975	158 days
3	Tony Street	Liberal	2nd Fraser	Minister Assisting the Prime Minister in Public Service Matters	22 December 1975	20 December 1977	1 year, 363 days
4	Wal Fife	Liberal	4th Fraser	Minister Assisting the Prime Minister in Public Service Matters	7 May 1982	11 March 1983	308 days
5	Ralph Willis	Labor	1st Hawke	Minister Assisting the Prime Minister for Public Service Matters	11 March 1983	28 June 1983	109 days
6	John Dawkins	Labor	1st Hawke	Minister Assisting the Prime Minister for Public Service Matters	28 June 1983	13 December 1984	1 year, 168 days
7	Peter Walsh	Labor	2nd Hawke	Minister Assisting the Prime Minister for Public Service Matters	13 December 1984	24 July 1987	2 years, 223 days
(5)	Ralph Willis	Labor	3rd Hawke	Minister Assisting the Prime Minister for Public Service Matters	24 July 1987	2 September 1988	1 year, 40 days
8	Peter Morris	Labor	3rd Hawke	Minister Assisting the Prime Minister for Public Service Matters	2 September 1988	4 April 1990	1 year, 214 days
9	Peter Cook	Labor	3rd Hawke; 1st Keating	Minister Assisting the Prime Minister for Public Service Matters	4 April 1990	24 March 1993	2 years, 354 days
10	Laurie Brereton	Labor	2nd Keating	Minister Assisting the Prime Minister for Public Service Matters	24 March 1993	23 December 1993	274 days
11	Gary Johns	Labor	2nd Keating	Minister Assisting the Prime Minister for Public Service Matters	23 December 1993	11 March 1996	2 years, 79 days
12	David Kemp	Liberal	1st Howard	Minister Assisting the Prime Minister for the Public Service	11 March 1996	17 March 1996	6 days
13	Peter Reith	Liberal	1st Howard	Minister Assisting the Prime Minister for the Public Service	17 March 1996	18 July 1997	1 year, 123 days
(12)	David Kemp	Liberal	1st Howard; 2nd Howard	Minister Assisting the Prime Minister for the Public Service	18 July 1997	26 November 2001	4 years, 131 days
14	Tony Abbott	Liberal	3rd Howard	Minister Assisting the Prime Minister for the Public Service	26 November 2001	7 October 2003	1 year, 315 days
15	Kevin Andrews	Liberal	3rd Howard; 4th Howard	Minister Assisting the Prime Minister for the Public Service	7 October 2003	30 January 2007	3 years, 115 days
16	Joe Hockey	Liberal	4th Howard	Minister Assisting the Prime Minister for the Public Service	30 January 2007	3 December 2007	307 days
17	Gary Gray	Labor	2nd Gillard	Special Minister of State for the Public Service and Integrity	14 September 2010	14 December 2011	1 year, 91 days
17	Gary Gray	Labor	2nd Gillard	Minister for the Public Service and Integrity	14 December 2011	25 March 2013	1 year, 101 days
18	Mark Dreyfus	Labor	2nd Gillard; 2nd Rudd ministry	Minister for the Public Service and Integrity	25 March 2013	18 September 2013	177 days
19	Eric Abetz	Liberal	Abbott	Minister Assisting the Prime Minister for the Public Service	18 September 2013	21 September 2015	2 years, 3 days
20	Michaelia Cash	Liberal	1st Turnbull; 2nd Turnbull	Minister Assisting the Prime Minister for the Public Service	21 September 2015	20 December 2017	2 years, 90 days
21	Kelly O'Dwyer	Liberal	2nd Turnbull	Minister Assisting the Prime Minister for the Public Service	20 December 2017	28 August 2018	251 days
22	Mathias Cormann	Liberal	1st Morrison	Minister for Finance and the Public Service	28 August 2018	29 May 2019	274 days
23	Scott Morrison	Liberal	2nd Morrison	Minister for the Public Service	29 May 2019	8 October 2021	2 years, 132 days
24	Ben Morton	Liberal	2nd Morrison	Minister for the Public Service	8 October 2021	23 May 2022	227 days
25	Katy Gallagher	Labor	Albanese	Minister for the Public Service	1 June 2022	Incumbent	4 years, 98 days

== Former ministerial titles ==
=== List of ministers assisting the Prime Minister for the public service and Cabinet ===
The following individuals have been appointed as Minister Assisting the Prime Minister for the Public Service and Cabinet, or any of its precedent titles:

Order	Minister	Party	Ministry	Title	Term start	Term end	Term in office
1	Greg Hunt	Liberal	2nd Morrison	Minister Assisting the Prime Minister for the Public Service and Cabinet	29 May 2019	22 December 2020	1 year, 207 days

=== List of ministers assisting the Prime Minister for public service industrial matters ===
The following individuals have been appointed as Ministers Assisting the Prime Minister for Public Service Industrial Matters, or any of its precedent titles:

Order	Minister	Party	Ministry	Title	Term start	Term end	Term in office
1	Ralph Willis	Labor	1st Hawke; 2nd Hawke	Minister Assisting the Prime Minister for Public Service Industrial Matters	28 June 1983	24 July 1987	4 years, 26 days

== List of assistant ministers for the public service ==
The following individuals have been appointed as Assistant Minister to the Minister for the Public Service, or any of its precedent titles:

Order	Minister	Party	Ministry	Title	Term start	Term end	Term in office
1	Ben Morton	Liberal	2nd Morrison	Assistant Minister to the Minister for the Public Service	22 December 2020	8 October 2021	290 days
2	Patrick Gorman	Labor	Albanese Ministry	Assistant Minister to the Minister for the Public Service	31 May 2023	Incumbent	3 years, 99 days
