= Nelson shadow ministry =

Australian shadow ministry in 2008

The Shadow Ministry of Brendan Nelson was the opposition Coalition shadow ministry of Australia from December 2007 to September 2008, opposing Kevin Rudd's Australian Labor Party ministry.

The shadow cabinet is a group of senior Opposition spokespeople who form an alternative Cabinet to the government's, whose members "shadow" or "mark" each individual Minister or portfolio of the Government.

Following the Labor Party's win, in the 2007 federal election, the Liberal–National Coalition became the official Opposition. Brendan Nelson was elected Leader of the Liberal Party on 29 November 2007 and announced that his deputy Julie Bishop would be Shadow Minister for Workplace Relations and that his unsuccessful rival for the Liberal leadership, Malcolm Turnbull, would be offered the position of Shadow Treasurer. Warren Truss was elected leader of the National Party. The composition of the remainder of the shadow cabinet was announced on 6 December 2007. Nelson's Cabinet lasted until 16 September 2008, following a leadership spill, which saw Turnbull emerge as the new leader.

== Members of the Shadow Cabinet (2007–2008) ==
Colour key
(for political parties)
Liberal
National

| Shadow Minister | Portfolio |
|---|---|
| Brendan Nelson MP | Leader of the Opposition |
| Julie Bishop MP | Deputy Leader of the Opposition; Shadow Minister for Employment, Business and Workplace Relations |
| Senator Nick Minchin | Leader of the Opposition in the Senate; Shadow Minister for Defence |
| Senator Eric Abetz | Deputy Leader of the Opposition in the Senate; Shadow Minister for Innovation, Industry, Science and Research |
| Warren Truss MP | Leader of the Nationals; Shadow Minister for Infrastructure and Transport and Local Government |
| Senator Nigel Scullion | Deputy Leader of the Nationals; Leader of the Nationals in the Senate; Shadow Minister for Agriculture, Fisheries and Forestry |
| Joe Hockey MP | Manager of Opposition Business in the House; Shadow Minister for Health and Ageing |
| Senator Chris Ellison | Manager of Opposition Business in the Senate; Shadow Minister for Immigration and Citizenship |
| Malcolm Turnbull MP | Shadow Treasurer |
| Andrew Robb AO MP | Shadow Minister for Foreign Affairs |
| Ian Macfarlane MP | Shadow Minister for Trade |
| Tony Abbott MP | Shadow Minister for Families, Community Services, Indigenous Affairs and the Voluntary Sector |
| Senator Helen Coonan | Shadow Minister for Human Services |
| Tony Smith MP | Shadow Minister for Education, Apprenticeships and Training |
| Greg Hunt MP | Shadow Minister for Climate Change, Environment and Urban Water |
| Peter Dutton MP | Shadow Minister for Finance, Competition Policy and Deregulation |
| Bruce Billson MP | Shadow Minister for Broadband, Communication and the Digital Economy |
| Senator George Brandis | Shadow Attorney-General |
| Senator David Johnston | Shadow Minister for Resources and Energy; Shadow Minister for Tourism |
| John Cobb MP | Shadow Minister for Regional Development; Shadow Minister for Water Security |

== Members of the Outer Shadow Ministry (2007–2008) ==
| Shadow Minister | Portfolio |
|---|---|
| Luke Hartsuyker MP | Deputy Manager of Opposition Business in the House; Shadow Minister for Business Development, Independent Contractors and Consumer Affairs |
| Christopher Pyne MP | Shadow Minister for Justice; Shadow Minister for Border Protection; Shadow Minister Assisting the Shadow Minister for Immigration and Citizenship |
| Michael Ronaldson MP | Shadow Special Minister of State; Shadow Cabinet Secretary |
| Steven Ciobo MP | Shadow Minister for Small Business, the Service Economy and Tourism |
| Sharman Stone MP | Shadow Minister for Environment, Heritage, the Arts and Indigenous Affairs |
| Michael Keenan MP | Shadow Assistant Treasurer; Shadow Minister for Superannuation and Corporate Governance |
| Margaret May MP | Shadow Minister for Ageing |
| Bob Baldwin MP | Shadow Minister for Defence Science and Personnel |
| Bronwyn Bishop MP | Shadow Minister for Veterans' Affairs |
| Andrew Southcott MP | Shadow Minister for Employment Participation and Apprenticeships and Training |
| Sussan Ley MP | Shadow Minister for Housing; Shadow Minister for Status of Women |
| Pat Farmer MP | Shadow Minister for Youth and Sport |

== Shadow Parliamentary Secretaries (2007–2008) ==
| Shadow Minister | Portfolio |
|---|---|
| Don Randall MP | Shadow Parliamentary Secretary Assisting the Leader of the Opposition; Shadow Cabinet Secretary |
| Senator Ian Macdonald | Shadow Minister Assisting the Leader of the Opposition in the Senate; Shadow Minister for Northern Australia |
| Senator Richard Colbeck | Shadow Parliamentary Secretary for Health |
| Senator Brett Mason | Shadow Parliamentary Secretary for Education |
| Peter Lindsay MP | Shadow Parliamentary Secretary for Defence |
| Barry Haase MP | Shadow Parliamentary Secretary for Infrastructure, Roads and Transport |
| John Forrest MP | Shadow Parliamentary Secretary for Trade |
| Louise Markus MP | Shadow Parliamentary Secretary for Immigration and Citizenship |
| Sophie Mirabella MP | Shadow Parliamentary Secretary for Local Government |
| Joanna Gash MP | Shadow Parliamentary Secretary for Tourism |
| Mark Coulton MP | Shadow Parliamentary Secretary for Ageing and the Voluntary Sector |
| Senator Marise Payne | Shadow Parliamentary Secretary for Foreign Affairs |
| Senator Cory Bernardi | Shadow Parliamentary Secretary for Families and Community Services |

== See also ==
- First Rudd Ministry
- Fourth Howard Ministry
