= Crean shadow ministry =

Shadow ministry of Australia (2001–2003)

The Shadow Ministry of Simon Crean was the opposition Australian Labor Party shadow ministry of Australia from November 2001 to December 2003, opposing John Howard's Coalition ministry.

The shadow cabinet is a group of senior Opposition spokespeople who form an alternative Cabinet to the government's, whose members shadow or mark each individual Minister or portfolio of the Government.

Simon Crean became Leader of the Opposition upon his election as leader of the Australian Labor Party on 11 November 2001, and appointed his first Shadow Cabinet on 22 November.

== November 2001 to August 2002 ==
The following were members of the Shadow Cabinet:

| Shadow Minister | Portfolio |
|---|---|
| Simon Crean MP | Leader of the Opposition |
| Jenny Macklin MP | Deputy Leader of the Opposition; Shadow Minister for Employment, Education, Training and Science |
| Senator John Faulkner | Leader of the Opposition in the Senate; Shadow Minister for Public Administration and Home Affairs |
| Bob McMullan MP | Shadow Treasurer |
| Senator Stephen Conroy | Deputy Leader of the Opposition in the Senate; Shadow Minister for Finance, Small Business and Financial Services |
| Craig Emerson MP | Shadow Minister for Innovation and Industry |
| Stephen Martin MP | Shadow Minister for Trade and Tourism |
| Senator Chris Evans | Shadow Minister for Defence |
| Martin Ferguson MP | Shadow Minister for Regional Development, Transport and Infrastructure |
| Julia Gillard MP | Shadow Minister for Population and Immigration |
| Carmen Lawrence MP | Shadow Minister for Reconciliation, Aboriganal and Torres Strait Islander Affairs; Shadow Minister for the Arts; Shadow Minister for the Status of Women |
| Robert McClelland MP | Shadow Attorney-General; Shadow Minister for Workplace Relations |
| Senator Kerry O'Brien | Shadow Minister for Primary Industries and Resources |
| Kevin Rudd MP | Shadow Minister for Foreign Affairs |
| Stephen Smith MP | Shadow Minister for Health and Ageing |
| Wayne Swan MP | Shadow Minister for Family and Community Services; Manager of Opposition Business |
| Lindsay Tanner MP | Shadow Minister for Communications |
| Kelvin Thomson MP | Shadow Minister for Environment and Heritage |

=== Shadow Outer Ministry ===
| Shadow Minister | Portfolio |
|---|---|
| Senator Kim Carr | Shadow Minister for Science and Research |
| David Cox MP | Shadow Minister for Employment Services and Training |
| Daryl Melham MP | Shadow Minister for Justice and Customs |
| Mark Latham MP | Assistant Shadow Treasurer; Shadow Minister for Economic Ownership; Shadow Minister for Urban Development and Housing |
| Senator Nick Sherry | Shadow Minister for Retirement Incomes and Savings; Shadow Minister for Consumer Affairs |
| Senator Kate Lundy | Shadow Minister for Information Technology and Sport |
| Senator Mark Bishop | Shadow Ministry for Veterans' Affairs |
| Gavan O'Connor MP | Shadow Minister for Regional Services, Territories and Local Government |
| Laurie Ferguson | Shadow Minister for Multicultural Affairs |
| Joel Fitzgibbon MP | Shadow Minister for Resources |
| Anthony Albanese MP | Shadow Minister for Ageing and Seniors |
| Nicola Roxon MP | Shadow Minister for Children and Youth |

=== Parliamentary Secretaries ===
| Shadow Minister | Portfolio |
|---|---|
| Alan Griffin MP | Parliamentary Secretary to the Leader of the Opposition; Parliamentary Secretary to the Shadow Minister for Consumer Affairs and Banking Services |
| Senator George Campbell | Parliamentary Secretary to the Shadow Minister the Manufacturing Industry |
| Graham Edwards MP | Parliamentary Secretary to the Shadow Minister for Defence |
| Warren Snowdon MP | Parliamentary Secretary to the Shadow Minister for Northern Australia and the Territories |
| Senator Joe Ludwig | Manager of Opposition Business in the Senate; Parliamentary Secretary to the Shadow Attorney-General |
| Sid Sidebottom MP | Parliamentary Secretary to the Shadow Minister for Primary Industries and Resources |
| John Murphy MP | Parliamentary Secretary to the Shadow Minister for Health and Ageing |
| Annette Ellis MP | Parliamentary Secretary to the Shadow Minister for Family and Community Services |
| Christian Zahra MP | Parliamentary Secretary to the Shadow Minister for Communications |
| Kirsten Livermore MP | Parliamentary Secretary to the Shadow Minister for Environment and Heritage |

== August 2002 to December 2003 ==
| Shadow Minister | Portfolio |
|---|---|
| Simon Crean MP | Leader of the Opposition |
| Jenny Macklin MP | Deputy Leader of the Opposition; Shadow Minister for Employment, Education, Training and Science |
| Senator John Faulkner | Leader of the Opposition in the Senate; Shadow Minister for Public Administration and Home Affairs |
| Bob McMullan MP | Shadow Treasurer |
| Senator Stephen Conroy | Deputy Leader of the Opposition in the Senate; Shadow Minister for Finance, Small Business, and Financial Services |
| Craig Emerson MP | Shadow Minister for Innovation, Industry and Trade |
| Gavan O'Connor MP | Shadow Minister for Regional Services, Territories and Local Government; Shadow Minister for Tourism |
| Senator Chris Evans | Shadow Minister for Defence |
| Martin Ferguson MP | Shadow Minister for Regional and Urban Development, Transport and Infrastructure |
| Julia Gillard MP | Shadow Minister for Population and Immigration |
| Carmen Lawrence MP | Shadow Minister for Reconciliation, Aboriganal and Torres Strait Islander Affairs; Shadow Minister for the Arts; Shadow Minister for the Status of Women |
| Robert McClelland MP | Shadow Attorney-General; Shadow Minister for Workplace Relations |
| Senator Kerry O'Brien | Shadow Minister for Primary Industries and Resources |
| Kevin Rudd MP | Shadow Minister for Foreign Affairs |
| Stephen Smith MP | Shadow Minister for Health and Ageing |
| Wayne Swan MP | Shadow Minister for Family and Community Services; Manager of Opposition Business |
| Lindsay Tanner MP | Shadow Minister for Communications |
| Kelvin Thomson MP | Shadow Minister for Environment and Heritage |

=== Shadow Outer Ministry ===
| Shadow Minister | Portfolio |
|---|---|
| Senator Kim Carr | Shadow Minister for Science and Research |
| Anthony Albanese MP | Shadow Minister for Employment Services and Training |
| Daryl Melham MP | Shadow Minister for Justice and Customs |
| Mark Latham MP | Shadow Minister for Community Security; Shadow Minister for Economic Ownership; Shadow Minister for Urban Development and Housing |
| David Cox MP | Assistant Shadow Treasurer |
| Senator Nick Sherry | Shadow Minister for Retirement Incomes and Savings; Shadow Minister for Consumer Affairs |
| Senator Kate Lundy | Shadow Minister for Information Technology and Sport |
| Senator Mark Bishop | Shadow Ministry for Veterans' Affairs |
| Laurie Ferguson MP | Shadow Minister for Multicultural Affairs |
| Joel Fitzgibbon MP | Shadow Minister for Resources |
| Annette Ellis MP | Shadow Minister for Ageing and Seniors |
| Nicola Roxon MP | Shadow Minister for Children and Youth |

=== Parliamentary Secretaries ===
| Shadow Minister | Portfolio |
|---|---|
| Alan Griffin MP | Parliamentary Secretary to the Leader of the Opposition; Parliamentary Secretary to the Shadow Minister for Consumer Affairs and Banking Services |
| Senator George Campbell | Parliamentary Secretary to the Shadow Minister the Manufacturing Industry |
| Graham Edwards MP | Parliamentary Secretary to the Shadow Minister for Defence |
| Warren Snowdon MP | Parliamentary Secretary to the Shadow Minister for Northern Australia and the Territories |
| Senator Joe Ludwig | Manager of Opposition Business in the Senate; Parliamentary Secretary to the Shadow Attorney-General |
| Sid Sidebottom MP | Parliamentary Secretary to the Shadow Minister for Primary Industries and Resources |
| John Murphy MP | Parliamentary Secretary to the Shadow Minister for Health and Ageing |
| Senator Michael Forshaw | Parliamentary Secretary to the Shadow Minister for Family and Community Services |
| Christian Zahra MP | Parliamentary Secretary to the Shadow Minister for Communications |
| Kirsten Livermore MP | Parliamentary Secretary to the Shadow Minister for Environment and Heritage |

== See also ==
- Third Howard Ministry
