= Beazley shadow ministry (2005–06) =

The Shadow Ministry of Kim Beazley was the opposition Australian Labor Party shadow ministry of Australia from January 2005 to December 2006, opposing John Howard's Coalition ministry.

== Final arrangement ==
The final arrangement was in place between 24 June 2005 and 4 December 2006.

=== Shadow cabinet ===
- Leader of the Opposition: Kim Beazley
- Deputy Leader of the Opposition and Shadow Minister for Education, Training, Science and Research: Jenny Macklin
- Leader of the Opposition in the Senate and Shadow Minister Indigenous Affairs, Family and Community Services: Senator Chris Evans
- Deputy Leader of the Opposition in the Senate and Shadow Minister for Communications and Information Technology: Senator Stephen Conroy
- Shadow Treasurer: Wayne Swan
- Shadow Minister for Superannuation and Intergenerational Finance, Banking and Financial Services: Senator Nick Sherry
- Shadow Minister for Regional Development: Simon Crean
- Shadow Minister for Health and Manager of Opposition Business in the House: Julia Gillard
- Shadow Minister for Industry, Infrastructure and Industrial Relations: Stephen Smith
- Shadow Minister for Finance: Lindsay Tanner
- Shadow Minister for Foreign Affairs, International Security and Trade: Kevin Rudd
- Shadow Minister for Defence: Robert McClelland
- Shadow Minister for Housing, Urban Development, Local Government and Territories: Senator Kim Carr
- Shadow Minister for Public Accountability and Human Services: Kelvin Thomson
- Shadow Minister for Child Care, Youth and Women: Tanya Plibersek
- Shadow Minister for Environment and Heritage, Deputy Manager of Opposition Business in the House: Anthony Albanese
- Shadow Minister for Employment and Workplace Participation, Corporate Governance and Responsibility: Senator Penny Wong
- Shadow Attorney-General: Nicola Roxon

=== Shadow outer ministry ===
- Shadow Minister for Consumer Affairs, Health Population and Health Regulation: Laurie Ferguson
- Shadow Minister for Agriculture and Fisheries: Gavan O'Connor
- Assistant Shadow Treasurer and Shadow Minister for Revenue, Small Business and Competition: Joel Fitzgibbon
- Shadow Minister for Transport: Senator Kerry O'Brien
- Shadow Minister for Sport and Recreation: Senator Kate Lundy
- Shadow Minister for Homeland Security, Aviation and Transport Security: Arch Bevis
- Shadow Minister for Veterans' Affairs and Shadow Special Minister of State : Alan Griffin
- Shadow Minister for Defence Industry, Procurement and Personnel: Senator Mark Bishop
- Shadow Minister for Immigration: Tony Burke
- Shadow Minister for Aged Care, Disabilities and Carers: Senator Jan McLucas
- Shadow Minister for Justice and Customs, Manager of Opposition Business in the Senate: Joe Ludwig
- Shadow Minister for Pacific Island Affairs and Overseas Aid: Bob Sercombe
- Shadow Minister for Citizenship and Multicultural Affairs: Senator Annette Hurley (from 8 August 2005)

=== Shadow parliamentary secretaries ===
- Shadow Parliamentary Secretary for Reconciliation and the Arts: Peter Garrett
- Shadow Parliamentary Secretary to the Leader of the Opposition: John Murphy
- Shadow Parliamentary Secretary for Defence and Veterans' Affairs: Graham Edwards
- Shadow Parliamentary Secretary for Education Kirsten Livermore
- Shadow Parliamentary Secretary for Environment and Heritage: Jennie George
- Shadow Parliamentary Secretary for Industry, Infrastructure and Industrial Relations: Bernard Ripoll
- Shadow Parliamentary Secretary for Immigration: Ann Corcoran
- Shadow Parliamentary Secretary for Treasury: Catherine King
- Shadow Parliamentary Secretary for Science and Water: Ursula Stephens
- Shadow Parliamentary Secretary for Northern Australia and Indigenous Affairs: Warren Snowdon
