= Latham shadow ministry =

Australian government opposition, 2003–2005

The Shadow Ministry of Mark Latham was the opposition Australian Labor Party shadow ministry of Australia from December 2003 to January 2005, opposing John Howard's Coalition ministry.

Mark Latham became Leader of the Opposition upon his election as leader of the Australian Labor Party on 2 December 2003, and appointed his first Shadow Cabinet on 8 December. Latham's appointments made no distinction between the Shadow Cabinet and the Shadow Ministry.

== December 2003 to October 2004 ==
- Leader of the Opposition – Mark Latham
- Deputy Leader of the Opposition and Shadow Minister for Employment, Education and Training – Jenny Macklin
- Leader of the Opposition in the Senate, Shadow Special Minister of State and Shadow Minister for Public Administration and Accountability – Senator John Faulkner
- Deputy Leader of the Opposition in the Senate and Shadow Minister for Trade, Corporate Governance and Financial Services – Senator Stephen Conroy
- Shadow Minister for Employment Services and Training – Anthony Albanese
- Shadow Minister for Veterans’ Affairs and Shadow Minister for Customs – Senator Mark Bishop
- Shadow Minister for Industry and Innovation and Shadow Minister for Science and Research – Senator Kim Carr
- Shadow Minister for Children and Youth – Senator Jacinta Collins
- Shadow Minister for Revenue and Shadow Assistant Treasurer – David Cox
- Shadow Treasurer and Deputy Manager of Opposition Business – Simon Crean
- Shadow Minister for Ageing and Seniors and Shadow Minister for Disabilities – Annette Ellis
- Shadow Minister for Workplace Relations and Shadow Minister for the Public Service – Craig Emerson
- Shadow Minister for Defence – Senator Chris Evans
- Shadow Minister for Population, Citizenship and Multicultural Affairs – Laurie Ferguson
- Shadow Minister for Urban and Regional Development and Shadow Minister for Transport and Infrastructure – Martin Ferguson
- Shadow Minister for Mining, Energy and Forestry – Joel Fitzgibbon
- Shadow Minister for Health and Manager of Opposition Business – Julia Gillard
- Shadow Minister for Consumer Affairs and Shadow Minister Assisting the Shadow Minister for Health – Alan Griffin
- Shadow Minister for Information Technology, Shadow Minister for Sport and Recreation and Shadow Minister for the Arts – Senator Kate Lundy
- Shadow Minister for Homeland Security – Robert McClelland
- Shadow Minister for Finance and Shadow Minister for Small Business – Bob McMullan
- Shadow Minister for Housing, Urban Development and Local Government – Daryl Melham
- Shadow Minister for Reconciliation and Indigenous Affairs and Shadow Minister for Tourism, Regional Services and Territories – Senator Kerry O'Brien
- Shadow Minister for Agriculture and Fisheries – Gavan O'Connor
- Shadow Attorney-General and Shadow Minister Assisting the Leader on the Status of Women – Nicola Roxon
- Shadow Minister for Foreign Affairs and International Security – Kevin Rudd
- Shadow Minister for Retirement Incomes and Savings – Senator Nick Sherry
- Shadow Minister for Immigration – Stephen Smith
- Shadow Minister for Family and Community Services – Wayne Swan
- Shadow Minister for Communications and Shadow Minister for Community Relationships – Lindsay Tanner
- Shadow Minister for Sustainability, the Environment and Heritage – Kelvin Thomson

Changes

- On 12 July 2004, Kim Beazley rejoined the Labor front bench as Shadow Minister for Defence, replacing Chris Evans. The latter became Shadow Minister for Defence Procurement, Science and Personnel.

== October 2004 to March 2005 ==
Latham reshuffled the Shadow Cabinet on 26 October 2004.

- Leader of the Opposition – Mark Latham
- Deputy Leader of the Opposition and Shadow Minister for Education, Training, Science and Research – Jenny Macklin
- Leader of the Opposition in the Senate and Shadow Minister for Social Security – Senator Chris Evans
- Deputy Leader of the Opposition in the Senate and Shadow Minister for Communications and Information Technology – Senator Stephen Conroy
- Shadow Treasurer – Wayne Swan
- Shadow Minister for Finance and Superannuation – Senator Nick Sherry
- Shadow Minister for Trade – Simon Crean
- Shadow Minister for Health and Manager of Opposition Business in the House – Julia Gillard
- Shadow Minister for Industry, Infrastructure and Industrial Relations – Stephen Smith
- Shadow Minister for Foreign Affairs and International Security – Kevin Rudd
- Shadow Minister for Defence and Homeland Security – Robert McClelland
- Shadow Minister for Defence Planning and Personnel – Arch Bevis
- Shadow Minister for Immigration – Laurie Ferguson
- Shadow Minister for Public Administration and Open Government, Indigenous Affairs and Reconciliation, The Arts – Senator Kim Carr
- Shadow Minister for Regional Development and Roads, Housing and Urban Development – Kelvin Thomson
- Shadow Minister for Work, Family and Community, Youth and Early Childhood Education – Tanya Plibersek
- Shadow Minister for Environment and Heritage, Deputy Manager of Opposition Business in the House – Anthony Albanese
- Shadow Minister for Employment and Workplace Participation, Corporate Governance and Responsibility – Senator Penny Wong
- Shadow Minister for Regional Services, Local Government and Territories – Senator Kerry O'Brien
- Assistant Shadow Treasurer, Shadow Minister for Banking and Financial Services – Joel Fitzgibbon
- Shadow Attorney-General – Nicola Roxon
- Shadow Minister for Agriculture and Fisheries – Gavan O'Connor
- Shadow Minister for Manufacturing, Consumer Affairs – Senator Kate Lundy
- Shadow Minister for Sport and Recreation – Alan Griffin
- Shadow Minister for Veterans' Affairs – Senator Mark Bishop
- Shadow Minister for Small Business – Tony Burke
- Shadow Minister for Ageing and Disabilities – Senator Jan McLucas
- Shadow Minister for Justice and Customs, Citizenship and Multicultural Affairs, Manager of Opposition Business in the Senate – Senator Joseph Ludwig
- Shadow Minister for the Pacific Islands – Bob Sercombe
