= Minister for Regional Development, Local Government and Territories =

Australian ministerial position

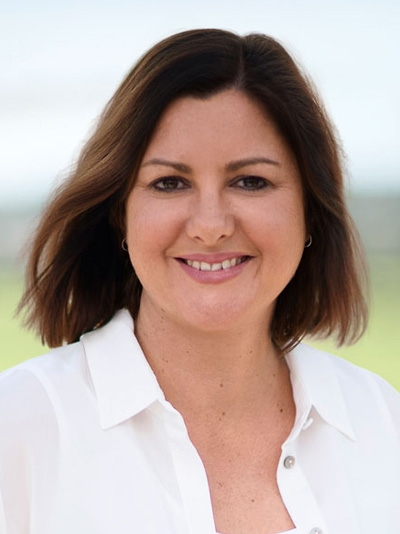
- Incumbent; Kristy McBain since 1 June 2022
- Department of Infrastructure, Transport, Regional Development, Communications, Sport and the Arts
- Style: The Honourable
- Appointer: Governor-General on the recommendation of the Prime Minister of Australia
- Inaugural holder: Fred Bamford (as Minister for Home and Territories)
- Formation: 6 January 1932
- Website: minister.infrastructure.gov.au/mcbain

The minister for regional development, local government and territories is a position within the Australian federal government.

The outer ministry position of Minister for Local Government, Territories and Roads was created in the Third Howard Ministry on 7 October 2003. The first minister to hold this position was Senator Ian Campbell, who held it from 7 October 2003 until 18 July 2004. On 18 July 2004, the position was transferred to Jim Lloyd, then Federal Member for Robertson. When the Fourth Howard Ministry started on 22 October 2004, Lloyd retained the position, and did so until the 2007 Federal Election when Kevin Rudd and the Australian Labor Party won government.

Rudd's first ministry eliminated the position of Minister for Local Government, Territories and Roads. The responsibilities were given to Anthony Albanese, Minister for Infrastructure, Transport, Regional Development and Local Government. Accordingly, the old Department of Transport and Regional Services was renamed to Department of Infrastructure, Transport, Regional Development and Local Government.

== List of ministers for regional development ==
The following individuals have been appointed Minister for Regional Development, or any precedent titles:

| Order | Minister | Party | Prime Minister | Title | Term start | Term end | Term in office |
|---|---|---|---|---|---|---|---|
| 1 | Tom Uren | Labor | Whitlam | Minister for Urban and Regional Development | 19 December 1972 | 11 November 1975 | 2 years, 327 days |
| 2 | John Carrick | Liberal | Fraser | Minister for Urban and Regional Development | 11 November 1975 | 22 December 1975 | 41 days |
| 3 | Ivor Greenwood | Liberal | Fraser | Minister for Environment, Housing and Community Development | 22 December 1975 | 8 July 1976 | 199 days |
| 4 | Kevin Newman | Liberal | Fraser | Minister for Environment, Housing and Community Development | 8 July 1976 | 20 December 1977 | 1 year, 165 days |
| 5 | Ray Groom | Liberal | Fraser | Minister for Environment, Housing and Community Development | 20 December 1977 | 5 December 1978 | 350 days |
| 6 | Alan Griffiths | Labor | Keating | Minister for Industry, Technology and Regional Development | 24 March 1993 | 23 January 1994 | 305 days |
| 7 | Peter Cook | Labor | Keating | Minister for Industry, Technology and Regional Development | 30 January 1994 | 25 March 1994 | 54 days |
| 8 | Brian Howe | Labor | Keating | Minister for Housing and Regional Development | 25 March 1994 | 11 March 1996 | 1 year, 352 days |
| 9 | John Sharp | Nationals | Howard | Minister for Transport and Regional Development | 11 March 1996 | 25 September 1997 | 1 year, 198 days |
| 10 | Mark Vaile | Nationals | Howard | Minister for Transport and Regional Development | 25 September 1997 | 21 October 1998 | 1 year, 26 days |
| 11 | John Anderson | Nationals | Howard | Minister for Transport and Regional Services | 21 October 1998 | 6 July 2005 | 6 years, 258 days |
| 12 | Warren Truss | Nationals | Howard | Minister for Transport and Regional Services | 6 July 2005 | 29 September 2006 | 1 year, 85 days |
| (10) | Mark Vaile | Nationals | Howard | Minister for Transport and Regional Services | 29 September 2006 | 3 December 2007 | 1 year, 65 days |
| 13 | Anthony Albanese | Labor | Rudd | Minister for Infrastructure, Transport, Regional Development and Local Government | 3 December 2007 | 24 June 2010 | 2 years, 207 days |
| 13 | Anthony Albanese | Labor | Gillard | Minister for Infrastructure, Transport, Regional Development and Local Government | 24 June 2010 | 28 June 2010 | 2 years, 207 days |
| 14 | Simon Crean | Labor | Gillard | Minister for Regional Australia, Regional Development and Local Government | 28 June 2010 | 25 March 2013 | 2 years, 270 days |
| (13) | Anthony Albanese | Labor | Gillard | Minister for Regional Development and Local Government | 25 March 2013 | 1 July 2013 | 98 days |
| 15 | Sharon Bird | Labor | Rudd | Minister for Regional Development | 1 July 2013 | 18 September 2013 | 79 days |
| (12) | Warren Truss | Nationals | Abbott | Minister for Infrastructure and Regional Development | 18 September 2013 | 15 September 2015 | 2 years, 153 days |
| (12) | Warren Truss | Nationals | Turnbull | Minister for Infrastructure and Regional Development | 15 September 2015 | 18 February 2016 | 2 years, 153 days |
| 16 | Fiona Nash | Nationals | Turnbull | Minister for Regional Development | 18 February 2016 | 27 October 2017 | 1 year, 251 days |
| 17 | Darren Chester | Nationals | Turnbull | Minister for Regional Development | 27 October 2017 | 20 December 2017 | 54 days |
| 18 | John McVeigh | Nationals | Turnbull | Minister for Regional Development, Territories and Local Government | 20 December 2017 | 24 August 2018 | 251 days |
| 18 | John McVeigh | Nationals | Morrison | Minister for Regional Development, Territories and Local Government | 24 August 2018 | 28 August 2018 | 251 days |
| 19 | Michael McCormack | Nationals | Morrison | Minister for Infrastructure, Transport and Regional Development | 28 August 2018 | 22 June 2021 | 2 years, 298 days |
| 20 | Barnaby Joyce | Nationals | Morrison | Minister for Infrastructure, Transport and Regional Development | 22 June 2021 | 23 May 2022 | 335 days |
| 21 | Catherine King | Labor | Albanese | Minister for Infrastructure, Transport, Regional Development and Local Government | 1 June 2022 | Incumbent | 4 years, 98 days |
| 21 | Kristy McBain | Labor | Albanese | Minister for Regional Development, Local Government and Territories | 1 June 2022 | Incumbent | 4 years, 98 days |

== List of ministers for local government ==
The following individuals have been appointed Minister for Local Government, or any precedent titles:

| Order | Minister | Party | Prime Minister | Title | Term start | Term end | Term in office |
|---|---|---|---|---|---|---|---|
| 1 | Tom Uren | Labor | Hawke | Minister for Territories and Local Government, Minister assisting the Prime Minister for Community Development and Regional Affairs | 11 March 1983 | 13 December 1984 | 4 years, 135 days |
| 1 | Tom Uren | Labor | Hawke | Minister for Local Government and Administrative Services | 13 December 1984 | 24 July 1987 | 4 years, 135 days |
| 2 | Margaret Reynolds | Labor | Hawke | Minister for Local Government | 18 September 1987 | 4 April 1990 | 2 years, 198 days |
| 3 | Wendy Fatin | Labor | Hawke | Minister for Local Government | 4 April 1990 | 20 December 1991 | 1 year, 267 days |
| 3 | Wendy Fatin | Labor | Keating | Minister for Local Government | 20 December 1991 | 27 December 1991 | 1 year, 267 days |
| 4 | David Simmons | Labor | Keating | Minister for Local Government | 27 December 1991 | 24 March 1993 | 1 year, 87 days |
| 5 | Brian Howe | Labor | Keating | Minister for Housing, Local Government and Community Services | 24 March 1993 | 23 December 1993 | 1 year, 1 day |
| 5 | Brian Howe | Labor | Keating | Minister for Housing, Local Government and Human Services | 23 December 1993 | 25 March 1994 | 1 year, 1 day |
| 6 | Warwick Smith | Liberal | Howard | Minister for Sport, Territories and Local Government | 11 March 1996 | 9 October 1997 | 1 year, 212 days |
| 7 | Alex Somlyay | Liberal | Howard | Minister for Regional Development, Territories and Local Government | 9 October 1997 | 21 October 1998 | 1 year, 12 days |
| 8 | Ian Macdonald | Liberal | Howard | Minister for Regional Services, Territories and Local Government | 21 October 1998 | 26 November 2001 | 3 years, 36 days |
| 9 | Wilson Tuckey | Liberal | Howard | Minister for Regional Services, Territories and Local Government | 25 January 2002 | 7 October 2003 | 1 year, 255 days |
| 10 | Ian Campbell | Liberal | Howard | Minister for Local Government, Territories and Roads | 7 October 2003 | 18 July 2004 | 285 days |
| 11 | Jim Lloyd | Liberal | Howard | Minister for Local Government, Territories and Roads | 18 July 2004 | 3 December 2007 | 3 years, 138 days |
| 12 | Anthony Albanese | Labor | Rudd | Minister for Infrastructure, Transport, Regional Development and Local Government | 3 December 2007 | 24 June 2010 | 2 years, 207 days |
| 12 | Anthony Albanese | Labor | Gillard | Minister for Infrastructure, Transport, Regional Development and Local Government | 24 June 2010 | 28 June 2010 | 2 years, 207 days |
| 13 | Simon Crean | Labor | Gillard | Minister for Regional Australia, Regional Development and Local Government | 28 June 2010 | 25 March 2013 | 2 years, 270 days |
| (12) | Anthony Albanese | Labor | Gillard | Minister for Regional Development and Local Government | 25 March 2013 | 1 July 2013 | 98 days |
| 14 | Catherine King | Labor | Rudd | Minister for Regional Australia, Local Government and Territories | 1 July 2013 | 18 September 2013 | 79 days |
| 15 | Paul Fletcher | Liberal | Turnbull | Minister for Territories, Local Government and Major Projects | 21 September 2015 | 19 July 2016 | 302 days |
| 16 | Fiona Nash | National | Turnbull | Minister for Local Government and Territories | 19 July 2016 | 27 October 2017 | 1 year, 100 days |
| 17 | Darren Chester | National | Turnbull | Minister for Local Government and Territories | 27 October 2017 | 20 December 2017 | 54 days |
| 18 | John McVeigh | National | Turnbull | Minister for Regional Development, Territories and Local Government | 20 December 2017 | 24 August 2018 | 251 days |
| 18 | John McVeigh | National | Morrison | Minister for Regional Development, Territories and Local Government | 24 August 2018 | 28 August 2018 | 251 days |
| 19 | Bridget McKenzie | National | Morrison | Minister for Regional Services, Sport, Local Government and Decentralisation | 28 August 2018 | 29 May 2019 | 274 days |
| 20 | Mark Coulton | National | Morrison | Minister for Regional Services, Decentralisation and Local Government | 29 May 2019 | 6 February 2020 | 2 years, 34 days |
| 20 | Mark Coulton | National | Morrison | Minister for Regional Health, Regional Communications and Local Government | 6 February 2020 | 2 July 2021 | 2 years, 34 days |
| (19) | Bridget McKenzie | National | Morrison | Minister for Regionalisation, Regional Communications and Regional Education | 2 July 2021 | 23 May 2022 | 325 days |
| (14) | Catherine King | Labor | Albanese | Minister for Infrastructure, Transport, Regional Development and Local Government | 1 June 2022 | Incumbent | 4 years, 98 days |
| 21 | Kristy McBain | Labor | Albanese | Minister for Regional Development, Local Government and Territories | 1 June 2022 | Incumbent | 4 years, 98 days |

== List of ministers for territories ==
The following individuals have been appointed as Minister for Territories, or any precedent titles:

| Order | Minister | Party | Prime Minister | Title | Term start | Term end | Term in office |
|---|---|---|---|---|---|---|---|
| 1 | Fred Bamford | National Labor | Hughes | Minister for Home and Territories | 14 November 1916 | 17 February 1917 | 95 days |
| 2 | Paddy Glynn, KC | Nationalist | Hughes | Minister for Home and Territories | 17 February 1917 | 3 February 1920 | 2 years, 351 days |
| 3 | Alexander Poynton, OBE | Nationalist | Hughes | Minister for Home and Territories | 3 February 1920 | 21 December 1921 | 1 year, 321 days |
| 4 | George Pearce | Nationalist | Hughes | Minister for Home and Territories | 21 December 1921 | 9 February 1923 | 4 years, 179 days |
| 4 | George Pearce | Nationalist | Bruce | Minister for Home and Territories | 9 February 1923 | 18 June 1926 | 4 years, 179 days |
| 5 | Sir William Glasgow, KCB, CMG, DSO, VD | Nationalist | Bruce | Minister for Home and Territories | 18 June 1926 | 2 April 1927 | 288 days |
| 6 | Charles Marr, DSO, MC | Nationalist | Bruce | Minister for Home and Territories | 2 April 1927 | 24 February 1928 | 328 days |
| 7 | Sir Neville Howse, VC, KCB, KCMG | Nationalist | Bruce | Minister for Home and Territories | 24 February 1928 | 29 November 1928 | 279 days |
| 8 | Aubrey Abbott | Country | Bruce | Minister for Home and Territories | 29 November 1928 | 22 October 1929 | 327 days |
| (6) | Charles Marr | United Australia | Lyons | Minister in charge of Territories | 6 January 1932 | 24 May 1934 | 2 years, 138 days |
| 9 | Harry Lawson | United Australia | Lyons | Minister in charge of Territories | 24 May 1934 | 12 October 1934 | 141 days |
| 10 | George Pearce | United Australia | Lyons | Minister in charge of Territories | 12 October 1934 | 29 November 1937 | 3 years, 48 days |
| 11 | Billy Hughes | United Australia | Lyons | Minister in charge of Territories | 29 November 1937 | 7 November 1938 | 343 days |
| 12 | John Perkins | United Australia | Lyons | Minister without portfolio administering External Territories | 7 November 1938 | 8 November 1938 | 1 day |
| 13 | Eric Harrison | United Australia | Lyons | Minister without portfolio administering External Territories | 8 November 1938 | 7 April 1939 | 169 days |
| 13 | Eric Harrison | United Australia | Page | Minister without portfolio administering External Territories | 7 April 1939 | 26 April 1939 | 169 days |
| (12) | John Perkins | United Australia | Menzies | Minister without portfolio administering External Territories | 26 April 1939 | 14 March 1940 | 323 days |
| 14 | Horace Nock | Country | Menzies | Minister without portfolio in charge of External Territories | 14 March 1940 | 28 October 1940 | 228 days |
| 15 | Thomas Collins | Country | Menzies | Minister without portfolio assisting the Prime Minister dealing with External Territories | 28 October 1940 | 26 June 1941 | 241 days |
| 16 | Allan McDonald | United Australia | Menzies | Minister for External Territories | 26 June 1941 | 29 August 1941 | 103 days |
| 16 | Allan McDonald | United Australia | Fadden | Minister for External Territories | 29 August 1941 | 7 October 1941 | 103 days |
| 17 | James Fraser | Labor | Curtin | Minister for External Territories | 7 October 1941 | 21 September 1943 | 1 year, 349 days |
| 18 | Eddie Ward | Labor | Curtin | Minister for External Territories | 21 September 1943 | 6 July 1945 | 6 years, 89 days |
| 18 | Eddie Ward | Labor | Forde | Minister for External Territories | 6 July 1945 | 13 July 1945 | 6 years, 89 days |
| 18 | Eddie Ward | Labor | Chifley | Minister for External Territories | 13 July 1945 | 19 December 1949 | 6 years, 89 days |
| 19 | Percy Spender | Liberal | Menzies | Minister for External Territories | 19 December 1949 | 26 April 1951 | 1 year, 128 days |
| 20 | Richard Casey | Liberal | Menzies | Minister for External Territories | 27 April 1951 | 11 May 1951 | 15 days |
| 21 | Paul Hasluck | Liberal | Menzies | Minister for Territories | 11 May 1951 | 18 December 1963 | 12 years, 221 days |
| 22 | Charles Barnes | Country | Menzies | Minister for Territories | 18 December 1963 | 26 January 1966 | 8 years, 38 days |
| 22 | Charles Barnes | Country | Holt | Minister for Territories | 26 January 1966 | 19 December 1967 | 8 years, 38 days |
| 22 | Charles Barnes | Country | McEwen | Minister for Territories | 19 December 1967 | 10 January 1968 | 8 years, 38 days |
| 22 | Charles Barnes | Country | Gorton | Minister for Territories | 10 January 1968 | 28 February 1968 | 8 years, 38 days |
| 22 | Charles Barnes | Country | Gorton | Minister for External Territories | 28 February 1968 | 10 March 1971 | 8 years, 38 days |
| 22 | Charles Barnes | Country | McMahon | Minister for External Territories | 10 March 1971 | 25 January 1972 | 8 years, 38 days |
| 23 | Andrew Peacock | Liberal | McMahon | Minister for External Territories | 25 January 1972 | 5 December 1972 | 315 days |
| 24 | Gough Whitlam^{1} | Labor | Whitlam | Minister for External Territories | 5 December 1972 | 19 December 1972 | 14 days |
| 25 | Bill Morrison | Labor | Whitlam | Minister for External Territories | 19 December 1972 | 30 November 1973 | 346 days |
| 26 | Tom Uren | Labor | Hawke | Minister for Territories and Local Government | 11 March 1983 | 13 December 1984 | 1 year, 277 days |
| 27 | Gordon Scholes | Labor | Hawke | Minister for Territories | 13 December 1984 | 24 July 1987 | 2 years, 223 days |
| 28 | John Brown | Labor | Hawke | Minister for the Arts, Sport, the Environment, Tourism and Territories | 24 July 1987 | 18 December 1987 | 147 days |
| 29 | Gary Punch | Labor | Hawke | Minister for the Arts and Territories | 19 January 1988 | 2 September 1988 | 227 days |
| 30 | Clyde Holding | Labor | Hawke | Minister for the Arts and Territories | 2 September 1988 | 22 May 1989 | 1 year, 214 days |
| 30 | Clyde Holding | Labor | Hawke | Minister for the Arts, Tourism and Territories | 22 May 1989 | 4 April 1990 | 1 year, 214 days |
| 31 | David Simmons | Labor | Hawke | Minister for the Arts, Tourism and Territories | 4 April 1990 | 20 December 1991 | 1 year, 267 days |
| 31 | David Simmons | Labor | Keating | Minister for the Arts, Tourism and Territories | 20 December 1991 | 27 December 1991 | 1 year, 267 days |
| 32 | Wendy Fatin | Labor | Keating | Minister for the Arts and Territories | 27 December 1991 | 24 March 1993 | 1 year, 87 days |
| 33 | Ros Kelly | Labor | Keating | Minister for the Environment, Sport and Territories | 24 March 1993 | 1 March 1994 | 342 days |
| 34 | Graham Richardson | Labor | Keating | Minister for the Environment, Sport and Territories | 1 March 1994 | 25 March 1994 | 24 days |
| 35 | John Faulkner | Labor | Keating | Minister for the Environment, Sport and Territories | 25 March 1994 | 11 March 1996 | 1 year, 352 days |
| 36 | Warwick Smith | Liberal | Howard | Minister for Sport, Territories and Local Government | 11 March 1996 | 9 October 1997 | 1 year, 212 days |
| 37 | Alex Somlyay | Liberal | Howard | Minister for Regional Development, Territories and Local Government | 9 October 1997 | 21 October 1998 | 1 year, 12 days |
| 38 | Ian Macdonald | Liberal | Howard | Minister for Regional Services, Territories and Local Government | 21 October 1998 | 26 November 2001 | 3 years, 36 days |
| 39 | Wilson Tuckey | Liberal | Howard | Minister for Regional Services, Territories and Local Government | 25 January 2002 | 7 October 2003 | 1 year, 255 days |
| (38) | Ian Macdonald | Liberal | Howard | Minister for Local Government, Territories and Roads | 7 October 2003 | 18 July 2004 | 285 days |
| 40 | Jim Lloyd | Liberal | Howard | Minister for Local Government, Territories and Roads | 18 July 2004 | 3 December 2007 | 3 years, 138 days |
| 41 | Catherine King | Labor | Gillard | Minister for Regional Services, Local Communities and Territories | 25 March 2013 | 1 July 2013 | 177 days |
| 41 | Catherine King | Labor | Rudd | Minister for Regional Australia, Local Government and Territories | 1 July 2013 | 18 September 2013 | 177 days |
| 42 | Paul Fletcher | Liberal | Turnbull | Minister for Territories, Local Government and Major Projects | 21 September 2015 | 19 July 2016 | 302 days |
| 43 | Fiona Nash | National | Turnbull | Minister for Local Government and Territories | 19 July 2016 | 27 October 2017 | 1 year, 100 days |
| 44 | Darren Chester | National | Turnbull | Minister for Local Government and Territories | 27 October 2017 | 20 December 2017 | 54 days |
| 45 | John McVeigh | National | Turnbull | Minister for Regional Development, Territories and Local Government | 20 December 2017 | 24 August 2018 | 251 days |
| 45 | John McVeigh | National | Morrison | Minister for Regional Development, Territories and Local Government | 24 August 2018 | 28 August 2018 | 251 days |
| 46 | Sussan Ley | Liberal | Morrison | Assistant Minister for Regional Development and Territories | 28 August 2018 | 29 May 2019 | 274 days |
| 47 | Nola Marino | Liberal | Morrison | Assistant Minister for Regional Development and Territories | 29 May 2019 | 23 May 2022 | 2 years, 359 days |
| 48 | Kristy McBain | Labor | Albanese | Minister for Regional Development, Local Government and Territories | 1 June 2022 | Incumbent | 4 years, 98 days |

=== Capital Territory ===
The following individuals have been appointed as Minister for the Capital Territory:

| Order | Minister | Party | Prime Minister | Title | Term start | Term end | Term in office |
|---|---|---|---|---|---|---|---|
| 1 | Kep Enderby | Labor | Whitlam | Minister for the Capital Territory | 19 December 1972 | 9 October 1973 | 294 days |
| 2 | Gordon Bryant | Labor | Whitlam | Minister for the Capital Territory | 9 October 1973 | 11 November 1975 | 2 years, 33 days |
| 3 | Reg Withers | Liberal | Fraser | Minister for the Capital Territory | 11 November 1975 | 22 December 1975 | 41 days |
| 4 | Eric Robinson | Liberal | Fraser | Minister for the Capital Territory | 22 December 1975 | 16 February 1976 | 56 days |
| 5 | Tony Staley | Liberal | Fraser | Minister for the Capital Territory | 16 February 1976 | 20 December 1977 | 1 year, 307 days |
| 6 | Bob Ellicott | Liberal | Fraser | Minister for the Capital Territory | 20 December 1977 | 3 November 1980 | 2 years, 319 days |
| 7 | Michael Hodgman | Liberal | Fraser | Minister for the Capital Territory | 3 November 1980 | 11 March 1983 | 2 years, 128 days |

=== Northern Territory ===
The following individuals have been appointed as Minister for the Northern Territory or successor titles:

| Order | Minister | Party | Prime Minister | Title | Term start | Term end | Term in office |
|---|---|---|---|---|---|---|---|
| 1 | Kep Enderby | Labor | Whitlam | Minister for the Northern Territory^{1} | 19 December 1972 | 19 October 1973 | 304 days |
| 2 | Rex Patterson^{1} | Labor | Whitlam | Minister for the Northern Territory^{1} | 19 October 1973 | 6 June 1975 | 2 years, 2 days |
| 2 | Rex Patterson^{1} | Labor | Whitlam | Minister for Northern Australia | 6 June 1975 | 21 October 1975 | 2 years, 2 days |
| 3 | Paul Keating | Labor | Whitlam | Minister for Northern Australia | 21 October 1975 | 11 November 1975 | 21 days |
| 4 | Ian Sinclair | National Country | Fraser | Minister for Northern Australia | 11 November 1975 | 22 December 1975 | 41 days |
| 5 | Evan Adermann | National Country | Fraser | Minister for the Northern Territory | 22 December 1975 | 28 September 1978 | 2 years, 280 days |
| 6 | Bob Collins | Labor | Hawke | Minister Assisting the Prime Minister for Northern Australia | 4 April 1990 | 20 December 1991 | 2 years, 53 days |
| 6 | Bob Collins | Labor | Keating | Minister Assisting the Prime Minister for Northern Australia | 20 December 1991 | 27 May 1992 | 2 years, 53 days |
| 7 | Ben Humphreys | Labor | Keating | Minister Assisting the Prime Minister for Northern Australia | 27 May 1992 | 24 March 1993 | 301 days |
| 8 | Josh Frydenberg | Liberal | Turnbull | Minister for Resources, Energy and Northern Australia | 21 September 2015 | 18 February 2016 | 150 days |
| 9 | Matt Canavan | Liberal National | Turnbull | Minister for Northern Australia | 18 February 2016 | 19 July 2016 | 1 year, 157 days |
| 9 | Matt Canavan | Liberal National | Turnbull | Minister for Resources and Northern Australia | 19 July 2016 | 25 July 2017 | 1 year, 157 days |
| 10 | Barnaby Joyce | National | Turnbull | Minister for Resources and Northern Australia | 25 July 2017 | 27 October 2017 | 94 days |
| (9) | Matt Canavan | Liberal National | Turnbull | Minister for Resources and Northern Australia | 27 October 2017 | 24 August 2018 | 2 years, 99 days |
| (9) | Matt Canavan | Liberal National | Morrison | Minister for Resources and Northern Australia | 24 August 2018 | 3 February 2020 | 2 years, 99 days |
| 11 | Keith Pitt; Scott Morrison | Liberal National | Morrison | Minister for Resources, Water and Northern Australia | 6 February 2020 | 2 July 2021 | 1 year, 146 days |
| 12 | David Littleproud | Liberal National | Morrison | Minister for Agriculture and Northern Australia | 2 July 2021 | 23 May 2022 | 325 days |
| 13 | Madeleine King | Labor | Albanese | Minister for Northern Australia | 1 June 2022 | Incumbent | 4 years, 98 days |

== Former ministerial titles ==
=== List of ministers for Interior ===
The following individuals have been appointed as Minister for the Interior:

| Order | Minister | Party | Prime Minister | Title | Term start | Term end | Term in office |
|---|---|---|---|---|---|---|---|
| 1 | Archdale Parkhill | United Australia | Lyons | Minister for the Interior | 12 April 1932 | 13 October 1932 | 184 days |
| 2 | John Perkins | United Australia | Lyons | Minister for the Interior | 13 October 1932 | 12 October 1934 | 1 year, 364 days |
| 3 | Eric Harrison | United Australia | Lyons | Minister for the Interior | 12 October 1934 | 9 November 1934 | 28 days |
| 4 | Thomas Paterson | Country | Lyons | Minister for the Interior | 9 November 1934 | 29 November 1937 | 3 years, 20 days |
| 5 | John McEwen | Country | Lyons | Minister for the Interior | 29 November 1937 | 7 April 1939 | 1 year, 148 days |
| 5 | John McEwen | Country | Page | Minister for the Interior | 7 April 1939 | 26 April 1939 | 1 year, 148 days |
| 6 | Harry Foll | United Australia | Menzies | Minister for the Interior | 26 April 1939 | 29 August 1941 | 2 years, 164 days |
| 6 | Harry Foll | United Australia | Fadden | Minister for the Interior | 29 August 1941 | 7 October 1941 | 2 years, 164 days |
| 7 | Joe Collings | Labor | Curtin | Minister for the Interior | 7 October 1941 | 6 July 1945 | 3 years, 279 days |
| 7 | Joe Collings | Labor | Forde | Minister for the Interior | 6 July 1945 | 13 July 1945 | 3 years, 279 days |
| 8 | Herbert Johnson | Labor | Chifley | Minister for the Interior | 13 July 1945 | 19 December 1949 | 4 years, 159 days |
| 9 | Philip McBride | Liberal | Menzies | Minister for the Interior | 19 December 1949 | 24 October 1950 | 309 days |
| n/a | Eric Harrison | Liberal | Menzies | Minister for the Interior | 24 October 1950 | 11 May 1951 | 199 days |
| 10 | Wilfrid Kent Hughes | Liberal | Menzies | Minister for the Interior | 11 May 1951 | 11 January 1956 | 4 years, 245 days |
| 11 | Allen Fairhall | Liberal | Menzies | Minister for the Interior | 11 January 1956 | 10 December 1958 | 2 years, 333 days |
| 12 | Gordon Freeth | Liberal | Menzies | Minister for the Interior | 10 December 1958 | 18 December 1963 | 5 years, 8 days |
| 13 | John Gorton | Liberal | Menzies | Minister for the Interior | 18 December 1963 | 4 March 1964 | 77 days |
| 14 | Doug Anthony | Country | Menzies | Minister for the Interior | 4 March 1964 | 26 January 1966 | 3 years, 226 days |
| 14 | Doug Anthony | Country | Holt | Minister for the Interior | 26 January 1966 | 16 October 1967 | 3 years, 226 days |
| 15 | Peter Nixon | Country | Holt | Minister for the Interior | 16 October 1967 | 19 December 1967 | 3 years, 112 days |
| 15 | Peter Nixon | Country | McEwen | Minister for the Interior | 19 December 1967 | 10 January 1968 | 3 years, 112 days |
| 15 | Peter Nixon | Country | Gorton | Minister for the Interior | 10 January 1968 | 5 February 1971 | 3 years, 112 days |
| 16 | Ralph Hunt | Country | Gorton | Minister for the Interior | 5 February 1971 | 10 March 1971 | 1 year, 304 days |
| 16 | Ralph Hunt | Country | McMahon | Minister for the Interior | 10 March 1971 | 5 December 1972 | 1 year, 304 days |
| 17 | Lance Barnard | Labor | Whitlam | Minister for the Interior | 5 December 1972 | 19 December 1972 | 14 days |

=== List of ministers for decentralisation ===
The following individuals have been appointed Minister for Decentralisation, or any precedent titles:

| Order | Minister | Party | Prime Minister | Title | Term start | Term end | Term in office |
|---|---|---|---|---|---|---|---|
| 1 | Bridget McKenzie | National | Morrison | Minister for Regional Services, Sport, Local Government and Decentralisation | 28 August 2018 | 29 May 2019 | 274 days |
| 2 | Mark Coulton | National | Morrison | Minister for Regional Services, Decentralisation and Local Government | 29 May 2019 | 6 February 2020 | 253 days |
| 3 | Andrew Gee | National | Morrison | Minister for Decentralisation and Regional Education | 6 February 2020 | 2 July 2021 | 1 year, 146 days |
| (1) | Bridget McKenzie | National | Morrison | Minister for Regionalisation, Regional Communications and Regional Education | 2 July 2021 | 23 May 2022 | 325 days |

== Notes ==
^{1} Whitlam was one of a two-man ministry consisting of himself and Lance Barnard for two weeks until the full ministry was announced.
