= Wilson Tuckey =

Australian politician (born 1935)

The Honourable Wilson Tuckey OAM
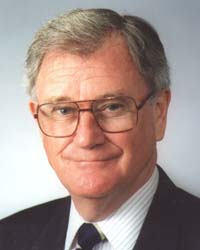

Minister for Regional Services, Territories and Local Government
- In office 25 January 2002 – 7 October 2003
- Prime Minister: John Howard
- Preceded by: Ian Macdonald
- Succeeded by: Ian Campbell

Minister for Forestry and Conservation
- In office 21 October 1998 – 26 November 2001
- Prime Minister: John Howard
- Preceded by: New title
- Succeeded by: Ian Macdonald

Member of the Australian Parliament for O'Connor
- In office 18 October 1980 – 21 August 2010
- Preceded by: New division
- Succeeded by: Tony Crook

Mayor of Carnarvon Shire
- In office 23 May 1964 – 5 June 1971

Personal details
- Born: 10 July 1935 (age 91) Perth, Western Australia
- Party: Liberal
- Nickname: Ironbar

Charles Wilson Tuckey OAM (born 10 July 1935) is an Australian politician who was a member of the House of Representatives from 1980 to 2010, representing the seat of O'Connor in Western Australia for the Liberal Party. He was a minister in the Howard government.

Tuckey was known for his controversial, acerbic style in politics and was nicknamed 'Ironbar' for an incident when he hit an aboriginal man with an ironbar.

== Early life ==
Tuckey was born in Perth. Before entering the Federal Parliament, he was a businessman and hotelier.

From 23 May 1964 until 1 March 1965, Tuckey was the last mayor of the town of Carnarvon; after that date the Town was amalgamated into the Shire of Carnarvon. Tuckey went on to serve as the first Shire president from 22 May 1965 until June 1971. Thereafter he was a councillor for the Shire's Commercial Ward until 1979.

In 1967, while employed as a publican in Carnarvon, Tuckey was convicted of assault after striking an Aboriginal man with a length of steel cable and fined $50. The man was allegedly being held down by Tuckey's brother at the time. Tuckey has had the nickname "Ironbar" ever since.

== Political career ==
In 1979, Tuckey was endorsed by the Liberal Party, ahead of the 1980 election, as its candidate for the then-new seat of O'Connor, covering a large section of rural Western Australia. The demographics of the seat suggested that it should have been a National Country seat, even though it was notionally a comfortably safe Liberal seat. Nevertheless, in 1980 a split between the federal and state branches of the National Country Party allowed Tuckey to win on Labor preferences.

Tuckey was one of the most controversial figures in Australian federal politics. In 1985 he taunted the then Labor Treasurer, Paul Keating, in Parliament about a former girlfriend called "Kristine", leading Keating to call him "a piece of criminal garbage". In one notorious exchange, Tuckey told Keating: "You are an idiot, you are a hopeless nong", to which Keating replied: "Shut up! Sit down and shut up, you pig … Why do you not shut up, you clown? … This man has a criminal intellect … this clown continues to interject in perpetuity". The enraged Keating demanded that John Howard, who the previous year had become Leader of the Opposition, discipline Tuckey; but Howard refused. Keating then promised to make Howard "wear his leadership like a crown of thorns". Keating and Howard's relationship, previously a civil one, deteriorated to the point where the two men refused to speak to one another. Reportedly, the last time they talked privately was when Keating stormed into Howard's office, furiously berated him for not disciplining Tuckey, and walked out.

Tuckey was a member of the Opposition shadow ministry from 1984 to 1989 and again from 1993 to 1996. He was Deputy Manager of Opposition Business in the House from 1988 to 1989 and 1993 to 1994.

In 1989, a group of Liberal parliamentarians, including Tuckey, plotted to remove Howard from the Opposition leadership and give the position back to Andrew Peacock (who had already held it from 1983 to 1985). After the plan succeeded, Tuckey boasted about his actions in a Four Corners interview, which privately infuriated Howard.

Tuckey addressed an AIDS conference and opened by saying "you don't catch AIDS, you let somebody give it to you".

=== Frontbencher ===
As Minister for Forestry and Conservation from 1998 to 2001, Tuckey angered conservation groups through his support for the forestry industry. In 2002, he blamed the environmentalist movement for Australia's severe bushfire problem, saying that their opposition to controlled burning in national parks increased the risk of fires.

In a reshuffle after the 2001 election, Tuckey was made Minister for Regional Services, Territories and Local Government. His ministerial demise came in August 2003, when it was revealed that Tuckey had written to South Australian Police minister Patrick Conlon, on ministerial letterhead, asking Conlon to "review" his son's conviction on a traffic charge. Howard said that Tuckey's actions were foolish but refused to dismiss him. Tuckey resigned shortly afterwards and returned to the backbench.

=== Backbencher ===
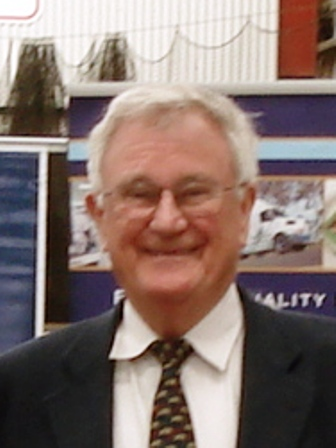
Tuckey in 2007

Following the 2004 election, Tuckey became the oldest sitting member of the House of Representatives. In 2005, when the Australian parliament passed a motion asking Singaporean authorities that Van Tuong Nguyen not be executed for drug smuggling, Tuckey was the only member of parliament who refused to support the motion.

Tuckey was often quoted in the media as supporting free markets and less government intervention in the economy. He is also well known for criticising the National Party on a number of issues. He was the most outspoken critic of the AWB in Federal Parliament, and he led the push for this board to be stripped of its export monopoly for wheat. Tuckey labelled National Party politicians who supported the single-desk system as "drongos". He also labelled National Party senator Barnaby Joyce a "lightweight" for arguing in favour of foreign ownership restrictions on Medibank Private after privatization.

In August 2006, Tuckey had a public argument with Labor leader Kim Beazley over new immigration laws, ending with Tuckey calling Beazley a "fat so and so". A year later, Tuckey sent a fax to John Howard and several Liberal MPs suggesting the Prime Minister relinquish the leadership.

Queensland Aboriginal activist Sam Watson, in January 2008, branded Tuckey an "extreme racist" after Tuckey had publicly deplored the decision to display traditional dancers from one of the Aboriginal tribes which historically resides near Parliament House at the opening of Federal Parliament. Watson concluded, "Mr Tuckey and his extremist racist views really do belong to another generation".

On 13 February 2008, Tuckey walked out during the opening of the 42nd Australian Federal Parliament immediately after prayers, and pointedly before the Prime Minister Kevin Rudd made a motion of apology to the Stolen Generation. He was one of six Liberal MPs (including fellow West Australian MPs Luke Simpkins, Dennis Jensen and the late Don Randall as well as Sophie Mirabella and the late Alby Schultz) to leave the house in protest to the apology to the Stolen Generations, thereby boycotting the motion. On the steps of parliament, Tuckey was sarcastic about what the apology would achieve for indigenous people:

"I'm there to say hallelujah. Tomorrow there'll be no petrol sniffing, tomorrow little girls can sleep in their beds without any concern — it's all fixed. The Rudd spin will fix it all. I've read it, I'm convinced. I think it's wonderful".

The following May, Tuckey was expelled from the house for 24 hours after breaching standards. His remarks against the Speaker arose during a heated question time in relation to the Rudd government's 'Fuel Watch Scheme'. On 24 September 2008, Tuckey was again expelled from the house, this time for one hour, for an outburst during House of Representatives Question Time.

In March 2010, Tuckey said that acknowledging traditional landowners at official events was a "farce" and that he had "never thanked anyone for the right to be on the soil that is Australian".

=== Defeat ===
From 1983 to 2007, Tuckey held O'Connor without serious difficulty, usually taking between 62 and 75 percent of the two-party preferred vote. At the 2007 federal election, Tuckey was reelected with 46 percent of the primary vote and a two-party margin of 67 percent against Labor.

However, at the 2010 federal election, Tuckey was defeated by Nationals WA candidate Tony Crook. He suffered a post-redistribution primary vote swing of 10 percent and a two-candidate swing of 20 percent, finishing on a primary vote of 38 percent and a two-candidate vote of 46 percent against Crook. He was 75 years old at the time of his defeat, making him the oldest sitting MP.

Tuckey broke his self-imposed silence after the election, verbally attacking Crook on a range of fronts. Tuckey described Crook as "a nobody who would be lucky to have his relatives turn up to hear his maiden speech in parliament".

In 2009, the year before his defeat he said he might seek to become the longest serving member of parliament by breaking the record held by former Prime Minister Billy Hughes. However his defeat in 2010 dashed hopes of him achieving this record as it ended his 30 years in Parliament, nowhere near the 51 years served by Hughes from 1901 until his death in 1952. It is also worthy of note that to match Hughes' record, Tuckey would have to have served as a Member until 2031, by which time he would be 96 years old.

Tuckey was awarded the Medal of the Order of Australia in the 2024 Australia Day Honours for "service to the people and Parliament of Australia".

Political offices
New title	Minister for Forestry and Conservation; 1998–2001	Succeeded by Ian Macdonald
Preceded by Ian Macdonald	Minister for Regional Services, Territories and Local Government; 2001–2003	Succeeded by Ian Campbell
Parliament of Australia
New division	Member for O'Connor; 1980–2010	Succeeded by Tony Crook
