= Ian Macdonald (Australian politician, born 1945) =

Australian politician

The Honourable Ian Macdonald AM
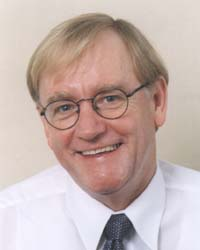
- Macdonald circa 2005

Minister for Fisheries, Forestry and Conservation
- In office 26 November 2001 – 27 January 2006
- Preceded by: Wilson Tuckey
- Succeeded by: Eric Abetz

Minister for Regional Services, Territories and Local Government
- In office 21 October 1998 – 26 November 2001
- Preceded by: Alex Somlyay
- Succeeded by: Wilson Tuckey

Senator for Queensland
- In office 1 July 1990 – 30 June 2019

Personal details
- Born: 29 November 1945 (age 80) Brisbane, Queensland, Australia
- Party: Liberal Party of Australia
- Occupation: Solicitor

Ian Douglas Macdonald AM (born 29 November 1945) is an Australian former politician who served as a Senator for Queensland from 1990 to 2019, representing the Liberal Party. He was Minister for Regional Services, Territories and Local Government (1998–2001) and Minister for Fisheries, Forestry and Conservation (2001–2006) in the Howard government. He was defeated at the 2019 federal election, having been the longest-serving incumbent member of parliament for the final years of his career.

== Early life ==
Macdonald was born in Brisbane, Queensland, and was a solicitor before entering politics. He was also a Councillor in the Burdekin Shire Council 1979–90. He was Vice-President of the Liberal Party in Queensland from 1987 to 1990.

== Early political career ==
In 1992, Macdonald was appointed to the Opposition Shadow Ministry under Liberal leader John Hewson as Shadow Minister for Local Government and the Australian Capital Territory. In 1994, following Alexander Downer's accession to the party leadership, Macdonald was given the positions of Shadow Minister for Regional Development and Shadow Minister for Infrastructure and continued to serve at these positions under Opposition leader John Howard.

== Howard government ==
Following the election of the Howard government, Macdonald was appointed Parliamentary Secretary to the Minister for the Environment in 1996. In 1998, MacDonald was appointed to the Second Howard Ministry as Minister for Regional Services, Territories and Local Government.

In 2001, Macdonald was appointed Minister for Forestry and Conservation in the Third Howard Ministry. His portfolio was renamed Fisheries, Forestry and Conservation in November 2002. He continued in this position in the Fourth Howard Ministry until January 2006 when he lost his position in a Cabinet reshuffle triggered by the retirement of Robert Hill.

== Return to Opposition ==
Following the defeat of the Howard government in 2007, Macdonald was appointed to the Opposition Shadow Ministry of Brendan Nelson as Shadow Minister Assisting the Leader of the Opposition and Shadow Minister for Northern Australia. On 22 September 2008, following the election of Malcolm Turnbull as Opposition Leader, Macdonald lost his position as Shadow Minister Assisting the Leader of the Opposition but retained the position of Shadow Parliamentary Secretary for Northern Australia.

In 2009, Macdonald lost his position in the Shadow Cabinet following Tony Abbott's accession to the Liberal leadership, but was appointed Shadow Parliamentary Secretary for Northern and Remote Australia. In 2010, he also took on the position of Shadow Parliamentary Secretary for the Defence Force and Defence Support.

== Final years in parliament ==
On 16 September 2013, following the election of the Abbott government, it was announced that despite Tony Abbott's stated aim of ministry continuity Macdonald had been dropped from the frontbench. Senator Macdonald described this day as "one of the worst" days in his life.

In June 2014, Macdonald joined Senator Cory Bernardi in expressing opposition to the Government's proposed deficit levy, claiming that he did not believe the increase "goes far enough." He also threatened to cross the floor over the proposed fuel excise hike.

In July 2018, Macdonald was demoted to fourth position on the LNP ticket, from which victory was considered very unlikely. In the 2019 federal election he lost his senate seat, and ceased to be a senator from 1 July 2019.

=== Controversy ===
On 3 November 2011 during debate on carbon tax legislation, Macdonald stated "GetUp! is the Hitler Youth wing of the Greens political movement." Senator Macdonald stood by his comments when challenged. While he later apologised to the Jewish community for this remark, he did not withdraw the comment in Parliament. He also once likened Stephen Conroy to Joseph Goebbels.

In September 2015 during Senate Question Time, Macdonald made an interjection toward NSW Labor Senator Doug Cameron based on Cameron's strong and distinctive Scottish accent. Macdonald interjected 'learn to speak Australian'. SA Labor Senator Penny Wong interrupted proceedings later to have Macdonald withdraw his comment. Macdonald revised his comment to say "learn to speak Australian, mate".

On 9 February 2017, Macdonald stated that he was likely to oppose the Federal Government move to abolish the lifetime gold pass, entitling politicians who had been elected prior to 2012 to 10 free business class flights per year. ABC News reported that Macdonald stated in the Liberal Party Room that "it's about time someone stood up for politicians entitlements".

On 30 May 2017, the senator was on ABC Local Radio Darwin discussing the benefits of shifting public servants from Canberra to more regional areas such as Darwin and regional Queensland. He further went on to say that public servants should be sacked if they refuse to "get out of their very privileged lives" in Canberra, Sydney or Melbourne, after no public servants volunteered to move.

On 9 April 2019, Macdonald asked if Penny Wong is related to Chinese billionaire Huang Xiangmo.

== Honours ==
Macdonald was appointed as a Member of the Order of Australia in the 2023 King's Birthday Honours for "significant service to the people and Parliament of Australia, to local government, and to the community of Northern Australia".

Parliament of Australia
| Preceded by John Faulkner | Father of the Senate; 2015–2019 | Succeeded by Kim Carr |
| Preceded by Philip Ruddock | Father of the Parliament; 2016–2019 | Succeeded by Kevin Andrews |
Political offices
| Preceded by Alex Somlyay as Minister for Regional Development, Territories and Local Government | Minister for Regional Services, Territories and Local Government; 1998–2001 | Succeeded by Wilson Tuckey |
| Preceded by Wilson Tuckey | Minister for Forestry and Conservation; 2001–2006 | Succeeded by Eric Abetz |
| Preceded by Warren Truss as Minister for Agriculture, Fisheries and Forestry | Minister for Fisheries; 2002–2006 | Succeeded by Eric Abetz |
