= Ian Campbell (Australian politician) =

Australian politician

The Honourable Ian Campbell

Minister for Human Services
- In office 30 January 2007 – 9 March 2007
- Prime Minister: John Howard
- Preceded by: Joe Hockey
- Succeeded by: Chris Ellison

Minister for the Environment and Heritage
- In office 18 July 2004 – 30 January 2007
- Prime Minister: John Howard
- Preceded by: David Kemp
- Succeeded by: Malcolm Turnbull

Minister for Local Government, Territories and Roads
- In office 7 October 2003 – 18 July 2004
- Prime Minister: John Howard
- Preceded by: Wilson Tuckey
- Succeeded by: Jim Lloyd

Senator for Western Australia
- In office 16 May 1990 – 31 May 2007
- Preceded by: Fred Chaney
- Succeeded by: Mathias Cormann

Personal details
- Born: 22 May 1959 (age 67) Perth, Western Australia
- Party: Liberal Party of Australia

Ian Gordon Campbell (born 22 May 1959) is an Australian former politician who served as a Senator for Western Australia from 1990 to 2007, representing the Liberal Party. He was a minister in the Howard government from 2003 to 2007.

== Early life ==
Campbell was born in Perth, Western Australia and lived for a time in Brisbane where he attended Brisbane Grammar School. He was a commercial and industrial property consultant and company director before entering politics.

== Politics ==
Campbell was chosen by the parliament of Western Australia on 16 May 1990 to replace retiring Senator Fred Chaney. He was elected in his own right in 1993, 1998 and 2004. He was a member of the Opposition Shadow Ministry 1994–96.

In government, he served in numerous roles: Parliamentary Secretary to the Minister for the Environment (1996); Parliamentary Secretary to the Minister for Sport, Territories and Local Government (1996); Parliamentary Secretary to the Leader of the Government in the Senate (1996); Parliamentary Secretary to the Treasurer (1996–98); Parliamentary Secretary to the Minister for Communications, Information Technology and the Arts (1998–2001); and Parliamentary Secretary to the Treasurer (2001–03). He was responsible for overseeing the federal government's preparations for the Y2K bug.

He was involved in presenting the bill that became the Environment Protection and Biodiversity Conservation Act 1999.

Campbell also later served as Minister for Local Government, Territories and Roads (2003–04), Minister for the Environment and Heritage (2004–07), and Minister for Human Services (2007).

=== Minister for the Environment and Heritage (2004–07) ===
In July 2004, a pre-election reshuffle saw Campbell become Minister for the Environment and Heritage. In this role, he acknowledged the need for action on climate change but argued that it was important to consider environmental issues in an economic context. Amid growing community concern over the issue, he also argued for a "post-Kyoto arrangement that is effective" and a "portfolio approach" to the issue, rejecting the notion of "silver bullet" solutions.

Campbell was a vigorous critic of whaling. Through the International Whaling Commission, he actively campaigned against commercial and "scientific" whaling.

In 2006, Campbell drew criticism for blocking a wind farm project in south-eastern Victoria on the basis that it may pose a risk to the critically endangered orange-bellied parrot. Commentators and the opposition rejected the decision as inconsistent and politically motivated.

In 2006, Campbell was criticised for the approval of the Cloud Break mine in the Pilbara region of Western Australia, because of the number of endangered species in the area of the future mine, among them the incredibly rare night parrot.

=== Minister for Human Services (2007) ===
In January 2007, a cabinet reshuffle saw Campbell appointed Minister for Human Services, which was elevated to a cabinet position. However, on 3 March 2007, Campbell resigned after revelations he had met disgraced former Western Australian Premier Brian Burke. The resignation came in the midst of Liberal Party attacks on Opposition leader Kevin Rudd for also having met with Burke, and was seen as a strategy to pressure and undermine Rudd. Prime Minister John Howard defended Campbell from charges of any moral wrongdoing, despite deputy leader Peter Costello's claim in Parliament that anyone who dealt with Burke was morally compromised.

Campbell announced his retirement from politics on 4 May 2007, saying that the Prime Minister had told him the door was still open for a return to the cabinet, but that he had decided to pursue a career in the private sector. The Liberal Party in Western Australia chose Mathias Cormann to take his place. Campbell formally resigned his Senate seat on 31 May 2007.

== Later life ==
Campbell stated on Sky News in 2021 Mark McGowan and his Labor government deserved to be re elected at the 2021 Western Australian state election.

Political offices
Preceded by Joe Hockey	Parliamentary Secretary to the Treasurer; 2001–2003	Succeeded by Ross Cameron
Preceded by Wilson Tuckey	Minister for Local Government, Territories and Roads; 2003–2004	Succeeded by Jim Lloyd
Preceded by David Kemp	Minister for the Environment and Heritage; 2004–2007	Succeeded by Malcolm Turnbull
Preceded by Joe Hockey	Minister for Human Services; 2007	Succeeded by Chris Ellison
