= Hawke ministry =

Hawke ministry may refer to:

Australian Commonwealth ministries:

- First Hawke ministry 1983–1984
- Second Hawke ministry 1984–1987
- Third Hawke ministry 1987–1990
- Fourth Hawke ministry 1990–1991

Other:

- Hawke ministry (Western Australia) 1953–1959
