= Keating government =

Government of Australia, 1991-1996

Keating government

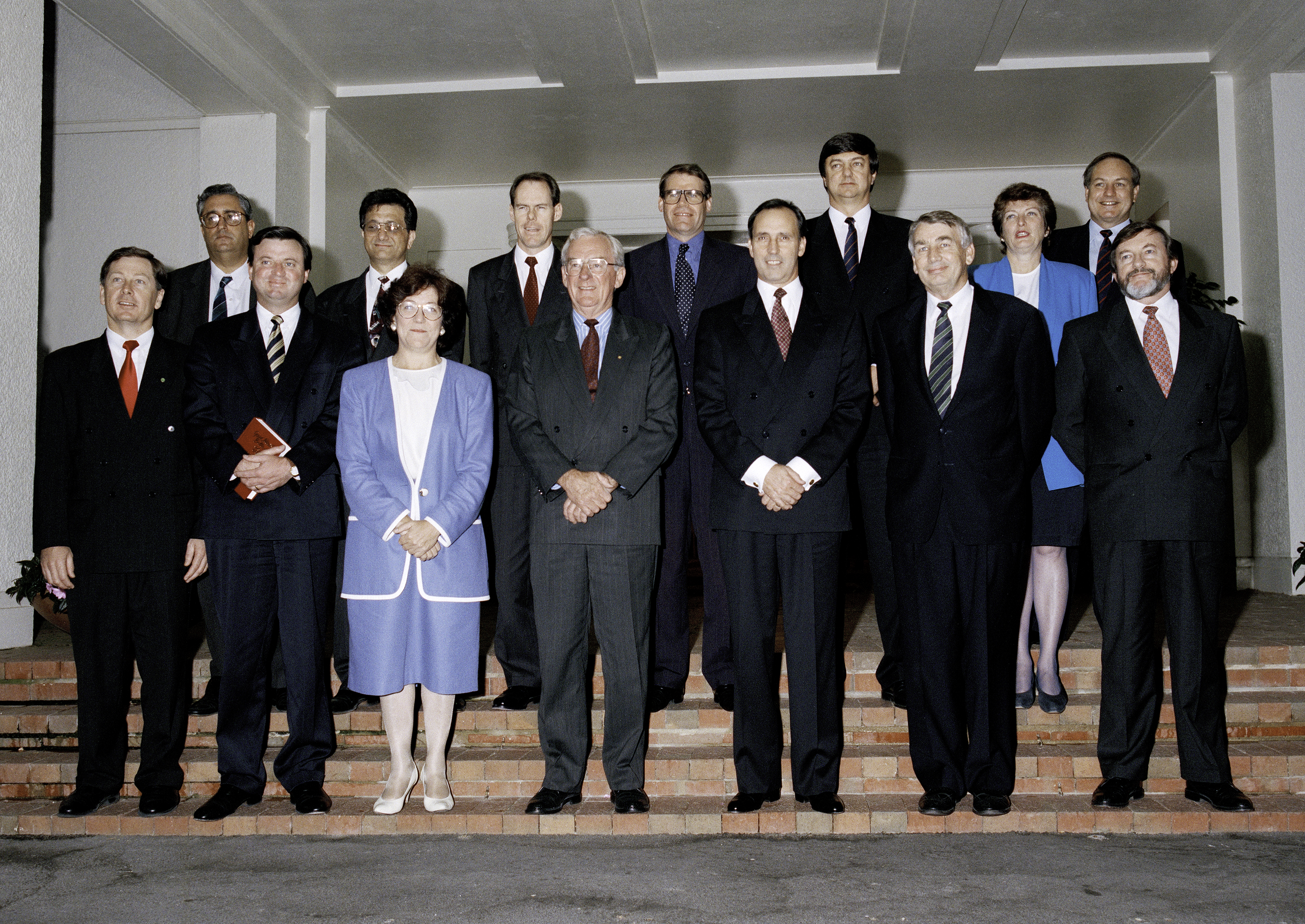

In office
- 20 December 1991 – 11 March 1996
- Monarch: Elizabeth II
- Prime Minister: Paul Keating
- Deputy: Brian Howe (1991–1995); Kim Beazley (1995–1996)
- Party: Labor
- Status: Majority
- Origin: Keating wins 1991 Labor leadership spill
- Demise: Lost 1996 election
- Predecessor: Hawke government
- Successor: Howard government

The Keating government was the federal executive government of Australia led by Prime Minister Paul Keating of the Australian Labor Party from 1991 to 1996. The government followed on from the Hawke government after Paul Keating replaced Bob Hawke as Labor leader in an internal party leadership challenge in 1991. Together, these two governments are often collectively described as the Hawke-Keating government. The Keating government was defeated in the 1996 federal election and was succeeded by John Howard's Coalition government.

== Background ==
Keating entered Parliament in 1969, aged just 25, when he won the seat of Blaxland for the Australian Labor Party. He went on to briefly serve as minister for Northern Australia during the final days of the Whitlam government in 1975. Keating then served an extended period in the Shadow Ministry through the period of the Fraser government, culminating in his appointment as Shadow Treasurer in January 1983. Labor, led by Bob Hawke went on to defeat Fraser at the subsequent 1983 federal election and Keating began a long period of service as the nation's Treasurer.

Keating had no tertiary qualifications and just previously three weeks experience as a minister. Despite this, Keating oversaw a number of important transitions in the Australian economy, including the floating of the Australian dollar and program of deregulation of the Australian economy: including privatisation of assets and reductions in tariffs. He formed a powerful partnership with Hawke to deliver numerous reforms; subsequently, Hawke initially agreed to stand down after the 1990 election in Keating's favour, but later reneged on this proposal, causing tension between the two. On 3 June 1991, Keating challenged Hawke for the leadership, lost the ballot and went to the backbench. Six months later he again challenged Hawke, this time winning the leadership of the Labor Party and becoming the 24th Prime Minister of Australia.

== Terms in office ==
Following his victory in the Labor Party leadership spill of December 1991, Keating went on to lead the Labor Party to the 1993 federal election. Labor was returned with an increased majority in the House of Representatives, with 80 seats to the Liberal Party's 49 and the National Party's 16 seats, with two independents.

Three years later, Keating again led the party to the 1996 federal election, in which it was soundly defeated by the John Howard-led Liberal–National Coalition: the Liberals won 75 seats, and the National Party a further 19 to Labor's 49. Keating then resigned from Parliament on 23 April.

=== Keating's personal style ===
Keating was a combative Parliamentarian. Author and journalist Peter Hartcher described him as "famed for his flair with an insult". In his earlier career as Treasurer, Keating once said of Opposition Leader John Howard, "From this day onwards Mr Howard will wear his leadership like a crown of thorns and in the Parliament I will do everything I can to crucify him." Other colourful invective he employed in the Parliament to describe political opponents included "brain-damaged", "mangy maggot" and "scumbags". In 1992, Keating refused to allow his Treasurer John Dawkins to appear before a senate estimates committee and described the Senate as consisting of "unrepresentative swill". During John Hewson's tenure as Opposition Leader, he once said that being challenged by Hewson was like "being flogged by a wet lettuce".

=== Economy ===
After succeeding from Hawke as Labor leader and prime minister, Keating reshuffled the Cabinet. Dawkins replaced Ralph Willis as Treasurer. In 1991 Australia was in the midst of a prolonged economic recession, with eight-quarters of declining economic growth. In response to these economic conditions, Keating announced the One Nation economic program in February 1992. Throughout his first year in office, unemployment continued to rise and with it government expenditure on welfare. In response, the government passed the Australian National Training Authority Act 1992 and Disability Discrimination Act 1992. Unemployment reached 11.4% at the end of 1992 – the highest level since the Great Depression.

The government introduced the Superannuation Guarantee in 1992 as part of a major reform package addressing Australia's retirement income policies. Since its introduction, employers have been required to make compulsory contributions to superannuation on behalf of most of their employees. This contribution was originally set at 3% of the employees' income, and has been incrementally increased.

A landmark workfare scheme known as Working Nation was implemented with the intention of providing work and training for the long-term unemployed, while the Industrial Relations Reform Act 1993 created a set of minimum entitlements in the workplace, relating to equal remuneration for work of equal value, unpaid parental leave, termination of employment (including unfair dismissal), and minimum wages. According to Bill Kelty, the industrial changes introduced by Keating government provided trade unions "with more rights to bargain and more protection than was afforded to unions in most other nations". In addition, the Sex Discrimination Act (SDA) and Affirmative Action Act of 1986 were strengthened in 1992 by a series of amendments, with the SDA provisions extended to federal industrial awards and protections against sexual harassment in the workplace extended.

A number of adjustments were made to the social wage during Keating's five years in office. These included the introduction of the Earnings Credit Scheme, which enabled pensioners to earn extra income without losing their pension payments, a nonincome-tested Child Care Cash Rebate and a Home Child Care Allowance, the latter of which was paid directly to full-time carers of children in the home, a maternity allowance, a Commonwealth Dental Health Program, the Mature Age Allowance (an early retirement scheme for unemployed disadvantaged Australians over the age of sixty), a Parenting Allowance (a payment for parents with children at home and with very little personal income), and an Additional Parenting Allowance to the partners of unemployed workers.

The system of rental assistance was made more generous, with the maximum rates of Rent Assistance rates increased in real terms between March 1993 and September 1994 by 138.9% for families with three or more children, by 109.2% for families with one or two children, by 90.5% for single recipients without children, and by 79.5 for couples without children. These increased rates were protected by inflation as the rates had been indexed twice yearly from March 1991 onwards. Students in receipt of the homeless rate of AUSTUDY or ABSTUDY were also made eligible for rental assistance.

The Keating government also made improvements to the family benefits system, continuing a major policy of the Hawke government. In 1987, the Hawke government established benchmarks for the adequacy of maximum level family payments (i.e. payments to social security recipients and low-income working families) to ensure that they provided effective assistance to those in need. These benchmarks were set at percentages of the pension rate, and were therefore linked indirectly to Average Weekly Earnings. From a value of 11.9% of the combined married pension rate, the value of the Family Allowance Supplement was set to increase to 15% for children under 13 years old and to 20% for children aged between the ages of 13 and 15. These benchmarks were increased by the Keating government in 1992 and again in 1995 to reach 16.6% and 21.6%, respectively.

The Keating government sold government business enterprises Qantas, CSL Limited and Commonwealth Bank.

=== Immigration ===
The Keating government pursued a multiculturalist immigration policy.

The Keating government introduced mandatory detention for asylum seekers with bipartisan support in 1992, scrapping a time limit of 273 days. Mandatory detention would become increasingly controversial under the succeeding Howard government, a Coalition government led by Howard.

=== Culture and society ===
The government's agenda under Keating included creating an Australian republic, reconciliation with Australia's Indigenous population, and furthering economic and cultural ties with Asia. Keating and his supporters styled his approach to social policy as "Big Picture" politics. Keating embarked on a legislative program which included establishing the Australian National Training Authority (ANTA) and the Creative Nation cultural policy in October 1994 (which significantly increased funding for the arts, established SBS independent and allocated funding for the Australian Interactive Media Industry Association and other new media initiatives). The government also undertook a review of the Sex Discrimination Act 1984, and legislated native title rights for Indigenous Australians following the Mabo High Court decision.

==== Republican nationalism ====
In February 1992, Paul Keating announced that he wanted Australia to change its national flag because it contained the Union Jack within its design. Later that month, Queen Elizabeth II visited Australia for the Sydney Council's 150th anniversary and Keating greeted the Queen with a speech in which he spoke of a growing "national purpose" and "independence" in Australia. He was then accused by the British press of breaching protocol by putting his arm around the Queen's back. When queried about these events in Parliament on 27 February 1992, Keating launched a repudiation of Australian ties to Britain and called the Liberals "'bootlickers" and "lickspitters" and accused them of "cultural cringe to a country which decided not to defend the Malay peninsula, not to worry about Singapore, not to give us our troops back to keep ourselves free from Japanese domination". The Liberal-National Opposition, led by Dr John Hewson, called the republican agenda a "distraction" from Australia's economic problems, criticised Keating's attack on Britain's war effort as a fiction and argued that Australia had already long since established independence from Britain. Australians for Constitutional Monarchy was established by Michael Kirby to counter the republican movement. Republicanism was however to become a key goal of Keating's cultural agenda for Australia.

With the House of Windsor suffering its 1992 annus horribilis, the republican cause became widely supported in the nation's newspapers, but Keating's comments about the flag and Britain's war record outraged groups like the Returned Services League (RSL), whose membership still consisted of veterans of the First and Second World Wars, and a ban on republicans from entering their clubs was announced for ANZAC Day 1992. The opposition and many observers called Keating's comments insensitive on the basis of such factors as the sinking of HMS Prince of Wales and HMS Repulse in the defence of Singapore. RSL President, Brigadier Alf Garland, called Keating "an Irish republican bigot". On 27 April 1992, Keating visited Kokoda in a conspicuous effort to shift Australia's war remembrance focus away from its role in assisting Britain at Gallipoli and in Europe in the First World War and towards Australia's Pacific War effort, and the New Guinea Campaign which saw Australian soldiers halt the advance of Japanese troops.

Keating proceeded with measures to remove the symbolism of Monarchy in Australia – removing reference to the Queen from citizenship and ministerial oaths and affirmations. In a 1993 election policy launch, Keating argued that Australia would be "better able to succeed in the world" with an Australian head of state and announced a committee of "eminent persons" to develop a discussion paper for transition to a republic to coincide with the 2001 centenary of Federation. Following the 1993 election, Keating announced that his vision for a republic had been endorsed and that he would move ahead with plans for referendum. In April 1993, the establishment of a Republic Advisory Committee was announced. Keating advocated a model involving parliamentary appointment of a president – this was criticised by members of the ALP left and by the new leader of the Australian Democrats, Cheryl Kernot who wanted more substantial change, such as direct election.

On 18 September 1993, Keating met with the Queen at Balmoral Castle and outlined his republican program, which involved a referendum for a transition to a republic by 2001, but for Australia to remain within the Commonwealth of Nations. The Republic Advisory Committee, chaired by Malcolm Turnbull of the Australian Republican Movement, submitted its report to the government on 5 October 1993 and Keating announced a working party of ministers to develop a paper for cabinet. Keating ultimately put forward a his original republican model.

Alexander Downer became Opposition Leader in May 1994 and developed an alternative policy for examining constitutional reform – proposing a constitutional convention be held sometime after the 1996 election to establish a consensus on the republican question. John Howard, a constitutional monarchist, succeeded Downer in 1995, but maintained the Coalition's commitment to this proposal. Howard, in contrast to Keating, spoke in favour of the constitutional monarchy, the Australian flag and traditions like the commemoration of ANZAC Day.

In June 1995, in a televised speech to Parliament entitled "An Australian Republic The Way Forward", Keating outlined a plan for a republic involving a president selected by a two-thirds majority of Parliament, following nomination by the Prime Minister and Cabinet. The reserve powers and ceremonial duties of the governor-general were to be maintained. This the government proposed be put to a referendum in 1998 or 1999. Howard went on to win the 1996 election and established the Australian Constitutional Convention 1998, which settled on a similar republican model to that proposed by Keating, which was put to the people by the Howard government in the 1999 Australian republic referendum.

==== Aboriginal affairs ====
Keating gave a high priority to progressing and defining Aboriginal Reconciliation. Robert Tickner was the minister for Aboriginal and Torres Strait Islander Affairs from 1990 to 1996.

The Council for Aboriginal Reconciliation was established in February 1992 and in 1993 the government passed the Native Title Act in response to the High Court's historic decision in Mabo v Queensland. It was Australia's first national native title legislation. Six months after the Mabo decision, Keating delivered his Redfern Park Speech to launch the International Year for the World's Indigenous People. Written by Keating's advisor Don Watson, it articulated the philosophical backdrop to the Keating government's subsequent Native Title Act 1993 and Land Fund and Indigenous Land Corporation (ATSIC Amendment) Act 1995, which amended the Aboriginal and Torres Strait Islander Commission Act 1989 to establish the Aboriginal and Torres Strait Islander Land Fund and Indigenous Land Corporation. Little noticed at the time, the Redfern Speech is now recognised by many observers as historic and significant. Addressing remarks to non-indigenous Australia, Keating said:

It begins, I think, with the act of recognition. Recognition that it was we who did the dispossessing. We took the traditional lands and smashed the traditional way of life. We brought the disasters. The alcohol. We committed the murders. We took the children from their mothers. We practised discrimination and exclusion.

In 1994, a group of Ngarrindjeri women claimed that a bridge development was being constructed at a sacred Aboriginal site for "secret women's business". The veracity of these claims was later rejected by other elders and leading to the Hindmarsh Island bridge controversy. Minister for Aboriginal Affairs, Robert Tickner issued an emergency declaration blocking work on the bridge, and then appointed a lawyer, Professor Cheryl Saunders, to report on the significant Aboriginal sites. As a part of this process some of these cultural secrets were written down and sealed in two envelopes marked Confidential: to be read by women only and forwarded to Tickner with the assessment. On 10 July 1994, Tickner placed a 25-year ban on the bridge construction putting the marina in doubt and bringing the Chapmans close to bankruptcy. The 1995 Hindmarsh Island Royal Commission called by the Government of South Australia ultimately found that the claims had indeed been fabricated, and Tickner became the focus of criticism.

In 1995, the Australian Aboriginal flag and the Torres Strait Islander flag were proclaimed official flags of Australia under the Flags Act 1953. The decision was criticised at the time by Liberal opposition leader John Howard.

In the final weeks of the Keating government, Pauline Hanson, a Liberal candidate running for the traditionally Labor electorate of Oxley, Queensland criticised the Keating government's approach to Indigenous affairs and immigration, saying that Aboriginal people were being given preferential treatment at the expense of others in need. Hanson was disendorsed by the Liberals, but only after ballot paper had been printed with her listed as a Liberal. She went on to win the seat and further denounce Keating's cultural and economic agenda in her controversial maiden speech to Parliament, saying: "We now have a situation where a type of reverse racism is applied to mainstream Australians by those who promote political correctness and those who control the various taxpayer funded 'industries' that flourish in our society servicing Aboriginals, multiculturalists and a host of other minority groups."

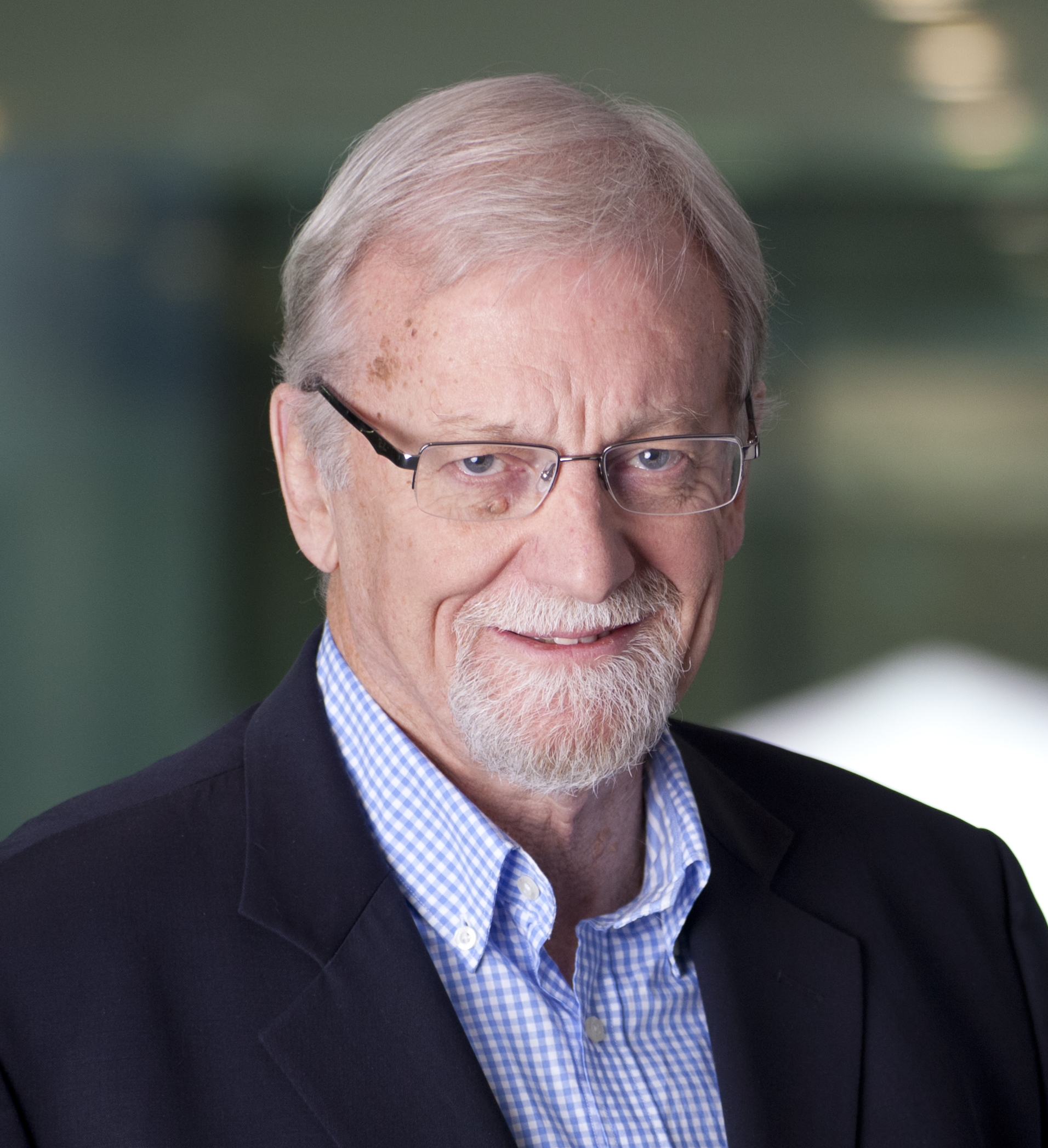
Gareth Evans served as Minister for Foreign Affairs for the duration of the Keating government.

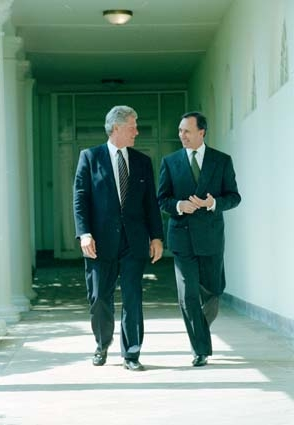
American President Bill Clinton (left) with Paul Keating in the West Wing of the White House during a state visit in 1993.

=== Foreign affairs ===
The Keating government was the first Australian Government to operate in a post-Cold War international environment. In foreign policy, the government developed bilateral links with Australia's neighbours, in particular with Indonesia, and took an active role in the development of the Asia-Pacific Economic Cooperation Forum (APEC), initiating the annual leaders' meeting.

Gareth Evans, as one of Australia's longest serving Ministers for Foreign Affairs was active in developing the United Nations peace plan for Cambodia, concluding the Chemical Weapons Convention, founding the Asia Pacific Economic Cooperation (APEC) forum and the ASEAN Regional Forum (ARF), as well as initiating the Canberra Commission on the Elimination of Nuclear Weapons.

Keating chose Indonesia as his first international visit as prime minister. President Suharto was also seeking closer ties, but the Australia-Indonesia relationship remained complicated by the East Timor situation, including the violent repression of East Timorese independence supporters in Dili in 1992. Keating lobbied various Asian nations and the United States to push for the development of APEC (established in 1989) as a regional forum for heads of government meetings to further economic co-operation in the Asia Pacific. Bill Clinton was elected in 1993 and became a supporter of the plan, while Malaysia's Prime Minister Mahathir Mohamad remained sceptical. Keating dismissed Mahatir as a "recalcitrant", resulting in a diplomatic incident, straining bilateral relations Nevertheless, Keating's broader hopes for APEC were ultimately achieved.

=== Defence ===
The Hawke government committed Australian naval forces to the 1991 Gulf War in support of the United States led coalition against the Saddam Hussein Iraqi regime's invasion of neighbouring Kuwait. Following the end of the Cold War, the 1990s was a busy period for United Nations peacekeeping missions, and the Keating government committed Australian forces to various theatres: at one point during 1993, Australia had some 3000 peacekeepers committed to the field, including a large number in Cambodia and Somalia. Foreign Minister Gareth Evans had taken a leading role in the organisation of a peace settlement for Cambodia in the aftermath of the genocidal regime of Pol Pot and Australia contributed the force commander. While the United Nations intervention in Cambodia was largely successful, the Somali intervention ended poorly. The following year, the Rwandan genocide commenced in Central Africa, and, following the Somali experience, the international community was this time slow to intervene. The Keating government despatched medical staff to aid in the belated UN Mission to that nation.

As part of his broader agenda for shifting Australia away from its old allegiances, Paul Keating was keen to improve defence ties with Indonesia. The ongoing occupation of East Timor by Indonesia by the undemocratic Suharto government and events like the 1991 Dili massacre, contributed to a large degree of popular disapproval of closer defence ties to Indonesia, nevertheless, Keating announced the conclusion of a security agreement with Jakarta in 1995. Opposition Leader Alexander Downer criticised the government for negotiating the security treaty in secret.

=== 1993 election ===
Most commentators believed the 1993 federal election was unwinnable for Labor; the government had been in power for 10 years, the pace of economic recovery was slow and unemployment was its highest rates since the Great Depression. Opposition Leader John Hewson took the unusual step of releasing Fightback!, a detailed series of economic policies proposals, well in advance of the 1993 Election. Central to the reforms was the inclusion of a Goods and Services Tax. In its 1992 One Nation Policy, The Keating government responded by promising to match the income tax proposals contained within Fightback!, but promising no GST. To demonstrate strength of intent, Keating promised two rounds of income tax cuts, legislating them and describing them as "L-A-W law". However, the tax cut law was repealed following the election, with the government instead announcing the money would be put into superannuation.

The Labor Party then launched a high-profile media campaign against the Coalition's GST. Keating told voters: "if you don't understand it, don't vote for it and if you do understand it, you'd never vote for it". Campaigning against the consumption tax dominated Keating's Election Campaign launch at the Bankstown Town Hall.

Keating's cultural agenda featured less prominently in the campaign, but proposals for furthering a republic remained a backdrop to the election.

Labor succeeded in winning back the electorate with a strong campaign opposing Fightback and its GST, and a promised focus on creating jobs coming out of the recession. Keating led Labor to an unexpected election victory, with an increased majority, and his "true believers" victory speech became famous. "This", remarked Keating, "Is the sweetest victory of all".

=== Second term and 1996 election ===
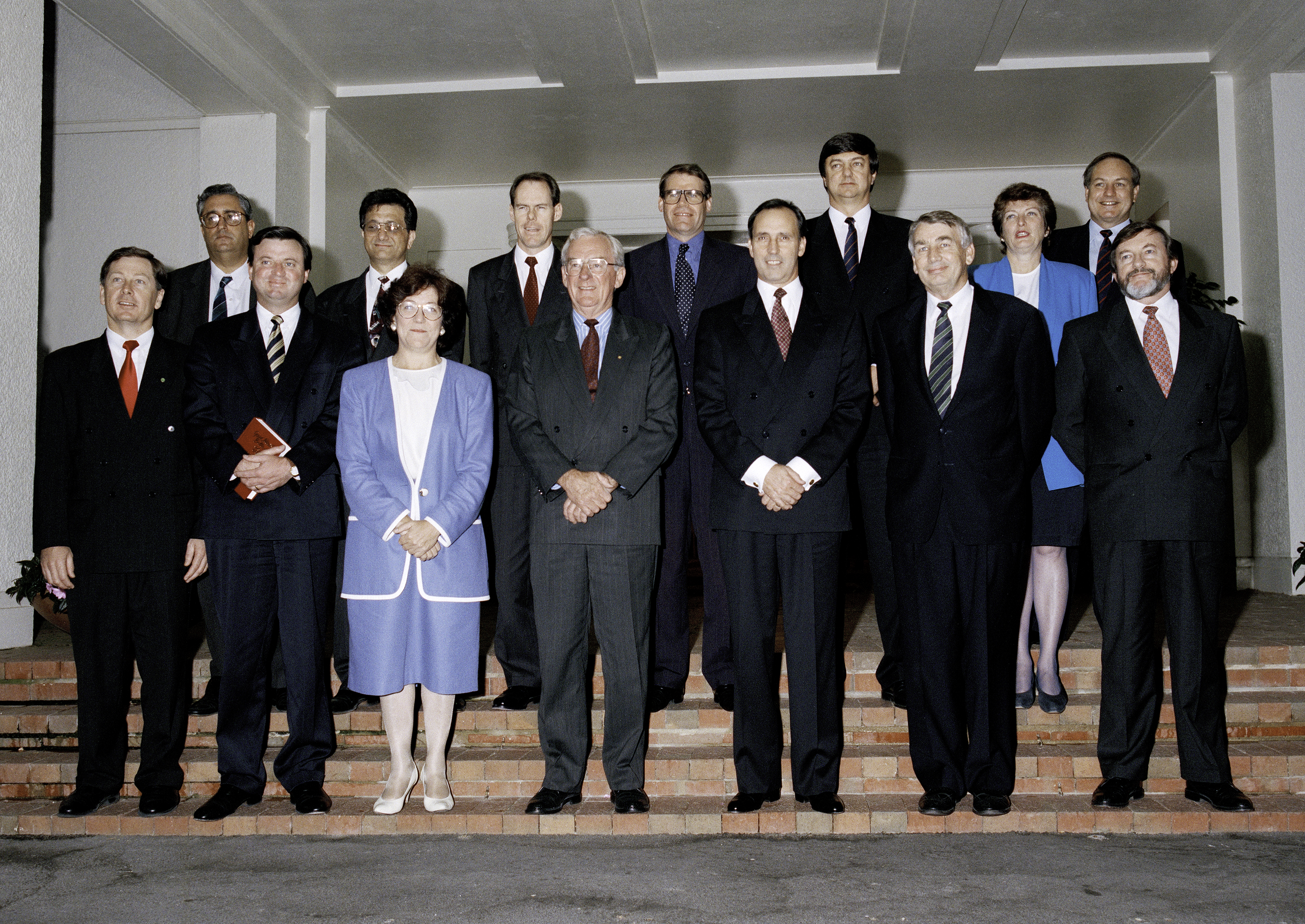
Keating and his cabinet in 1994

A poorly performing economy, republicanism, indigenous title to land, and industrial relations policy were major issues of the Keating government's second term.

In July 1993, a budget deficit for 1992-3 was disclosed at $14.6 billion. Treasurer Dawkins outlined a 1993–1994 budget projection for a $16.8 billion deficit (3.8% of GDP) but promised to bring down the deficit to 1% of GDP by 1996–7. Unemployment remained at 11%. The current account of the balance of payments was in deficit at $15.4 billion and forecast to rise to $18 billion. Debt financing for public sector borrowing amounted to $20.3 billion in 1992-3 and was also projected to rise. The government had supplemented expenditure through asset sales, such as the sale of Qantas. Treasurer Dawkins resigned from Parliament in December 1993, citing a desire to spend more time with his family.

In its second term of office, the Keating government lost four senior ministers: Graham Richardson resigned involuntarily in March 1994. This was at the same time as the involuntary resignation of Ros Kelly over the Sports rorts affair. Following the resignation of treasurer John Dawkins former WA Premier Carmen Lawrence entered parliament and the ministry. However she was unable to contribute as effectively as might have been expected due to controversy over the Royal Commission into the Easton affair.

Following the 1993 election loss, the Liberal Opposition initially retained John Hewson as leader, but in 1994 elected the younger Alexander Downer as leader. Downer failed to make inroads against Keating and in 1995 the party turned to John Howard a former opposition leader, who had also been Treasurer in the Fraser government which had been defeated by the Hawke-Keating Labor ticket in 1983. The veteran leader restored the Liberal's electoral fortunes and led the Coalition to defeat Paul Keating at the 1996 federal election.

By the time of the 1996 election, unemployment was at a lower rate than at the previous 1993 election, and interest rates were lower than they had been in 1990, but foreign debt had been growing. The Keating government was projecting a small budget surplus. Following the election, an $8 billion deficit was confirmed. In his 18 February 1996 Policy Launch Speech, Opposition Leader John Howard emphasised that Labor had been in office a long time, and cited high inflation, a poor current account deficit and high national debt as evidence of bad economic management. He called for industrial relations reform and proposed an increased spending on environmental challenges, to be in part funded by the partial sale of Telstra. He also promised to restore the prime minister's attendance at question time in parliament (which Keating had reduced in his final term).

The Coalition won government in a landslide – with the Liberal Party increasing its House of Representatives seats from 49 to 75 and the National Party, led by Tim Fischer, increasing its seats, from 16 to 19, giving a 55-seat majority to the Coalition. On 11 March 1996, John Howard became the 25th Prime Minister of Australia.

The 13-year Hawke-Keating government saw the longest period in office for the Australian Labor Party in its century of existence.

== See also ==
- First Hawke ministry
- Second Hawke ministry
- Third Hawke ministry
- Fourth Hawke ministry
- First Keating ministry
- Second Keating ministry

== Bibliography ==
- Paul Kelly (1992). The End of Certainty: The story of the 1980s. Allen & Unwin. ISBN 1-86373-227-6.
