= Minister for Multicultural Affairs (Australia) =

Australian cabinet position

- Commonwealth Coat of Arms

- Flag of Australia

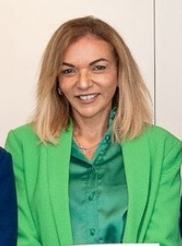
- Incumbent; Anne Aly since 13 May 2025
- Department of Home Affairs
- Style: The Honourable
- Appointer: Governor-General on the advice of the prime minister
- Inaugural holder: Michael MacKellar (as Minister for Immigration and Ethnic Affairs)
- Formation: 22 December 1975
- Website: minister.homeaffairs.gov.au/AnneAly/Pages/Welcome.aspx

The Minister for Multicultural Affairs is an Australian Government cabinet position which is currently held by Anne Aly following her swearing-in on 13 May 2025 as a result of Anthony Albanese's Labor government being re-elected at the 2025 Australian federal election.

The post was created in 1975 by being added to the Immigration portfolio with Michael MacKellar being the inaugural officeholder as the Minister for Immigration and Ethnic Affairs. It was a cabinet position throughout the Fraser, Hawke and Keating governments. In Howard's first ministry, the portfolio took its current name of multicultural affairs and was dropped to the outer ministry. It returned to cabinet in the second Howard ministry and remained there until the end of the Howard government. Philip Ruddock, became the longest serving minister during this time, serving in the role between 1996 and 2003. Multicultural affairs was managed at the parliamentary secretary level during the first Rudd and first Gillard ministries. Midway through the second Gillard ministry, Kate Lundy was promoted from parliamentary secretary to the outer ministry and during the short lived second Rudd ministry, the portfolio was both in cabinet managed by Tony Burke and the outer ministry with Lundy. The return of the Coalition to government in 2013, saw the portfolio dropped altogether until Turnbull's first ministry where an assistant minister was appointed. The role returned to the outer ministry halfway into to Turnbull's second and remained there until July 2024, when after a 11-year absence it was converted back into a cabinet post with Tony Burke returning to his former role as Minister for Immigration and Multicultural Affairs. In the second Albanese ministry, immigration and multicultural affairs were split into two cabinets roles with Anne Aly currently serving as the minister.

== List of cabinet ministers for multicultural affairs ==
The following individuals served as the Minister for Multicultural Affairs, or any precedent titles and sat in the Cabinet:

Order	Minister	Party	Ministry	Title	Term start	Term end	Term in office
1	Michael MacKellar	Liberal	2nd Fraser; 3rd Fraser	Minister for Immigration and Ethnic Affairs	22 December 1975	8 December 1979	3 years, 351 days
2	Ian Macphee	Liberal	3rd Fraser; 4th Fraser	Minister for Immigration and Ethnic Affairs	8 December 1979	7 May 1982	2 years, 150 days
3	John Hodges	Liberal	4th Fraser	Minister for Immigration and Ethnic Affairs	7 May 1982	11 March 1983	308 days
4	Stewart West	Labor	1st Hawke	Minister for Immigration and Ethnic Affairs	11 March 1983	13 December 1984	1 year, 277 days
5	Chris Hurford	Labor	2nd Hawke	Minister for Immigration and Ethnic Affairs	13 December 1984	16 February 1987	2 years, 65 days
6	Mick Young	Labor	2nd Hawke; 3rd Hawke	Minister for Immigration, Local Government and Ethnic Affairs	16 February 1987	12 February 1988	361 days
7	Clyde Holding	Labor	3rd Hawke	Minister for Immigration, Local Government and Ethnic Affairs; Minister Assisting the Prime Minister for Multicultural Affairs	15 February 1988	2 September 1988	203 days
8	Robert Ray	Labor	3rd Hawke	Minister for Immigration, Local Government and Ethnic Affairs	2 September 1988	4 April 1990	1 year, 214 days
9	Gerry Hand	Labor	4th Hawke; 1st Keating	Minister for Immigration, Local Government and Ethnic Affairs	4 April 1990	24 March 1993	2 years, 354 days
10	Nick Bolkus	Labor	2nd Keating	Minister for Immigration and Ethnic Affairs	24 March 1993	11 March 1996	2 years, 353 days
11	Philip Ruddock	Liberal	2nd Howard	Minister for Immigration and Multicultural Affairs	21 October 1998	26 November 2001	4 years, 351 days
11	Philip Ruddock	Liberal	3rd Howard	Minister for Immigration, Multicultural and Indigenous Affairs	26 November 2001	7 October 2003	4 years, 351 days
12	Amanda Vanstone	Liberal	3rd Howard; 4th Howard	Minister for Immigration, Multicultural and Indigenous Affairs	7 October 2003	3 January 2007	3 years, 115 days
13	Tony Burke	Labor	2nd Rudd	Minister for Immigration, Multicultural Affairs and Citizenship	1 July 2013	18 September 2013	79 days
(13)	Tony Burke	Labor	1st Albanese	Minister for Immigration and Multicultural Affairs	29 July 2024	13 May 2025	288 days
14	Anne Aly	Labor	2nd Albanese	Minister for Multicultural Affairs	13 May 2025	Incumbent	1 year, 117 days

== List of ministers for multicultural affairs outside of cabinet ==
On 24 July 1987 the third Hawke ministry implemented a two-level ministerial structure, with distinctions drawn between senior and junior ministers. This arrangement has been continued by subsequent governments; although there has not always been a junior minister in the multicultural affairs portfolio. The following individuals served as the Minister for Multicultural Affairs, or any precedent titles but did not sit in the Cabinet:

Order	Minister	Party affiliation	Ministry	Ministerial title	Term start	Term end	Term in office
1	Clyde Holding	Labor	3rd Hawke	Minister Assisting the Minister for Immigration, Local Government and Ethnic Affairs	2 September 1988	4 April 1990	1 year, 214 days
2	Philip Ruddock	Liberal	1st Howard	Minister for Immigration and Multicultural Affairs	11 March 1996	21 October 1998	2 years, 224 days
3	Gary Hardgrave	Liberal	3rd Howard	Minister for Citizenship and Multicultural Affairs	26 November 2001	26 October 2004	2 years, 335 days
4	Peter McGauran	National	4th Howard	Minister for Citizenship and Multicultural Affairs	26 October 2004	6 July 2005	253 days
5	John Cobb	National	4th Howard	Minister for Citizenship and Multicultural Affairs	6 July 2005	27 January 2006	205 days
6	Kate Lundy	Labor	2nd Gillard	Minister for Multicultural Affairs	5 March 2012	18 September 2013	1 year, 197 days
6	Kate Lundy	Labor	2nd Rudd	Minister for Multicultural Affairs	5 March 2012	18 September 2013	1 year, 197 days
7	Alan Tudge	Liberal	2nd Turnbull	Minister for Citizenship and Multicultural Affairs	20 December 2017	23 August 2018	246 days
8	David Coleman	Liberal	1st Morrison	Minister for Immigration, Citizenship and Multicultural Affairs	28 August 2018	29 May 2019	1 year, 107 days
8	David Coleman	Liberal	2nd Morrison	Minister for Immigration, Citizenship, Migrant Services and Multicultural Affairs	29 May 2019	13 December 2019	1 year, 107 days
(acting)	Alan Tudge	Liberal	2nd Morrison	Minister for Immigration, Citizenship, Migrant Services and Multicultural Affairs	13 December 2019	22 December 2020	1 year, 9 days
9	Alex Hawke	Liberal	2nd Morrison	Minister for Immigration, Citizenship, Migrant Services and Multicultural Affairs	22 December 2020	23 May 2022	1 year, 152 days
10	Andrew Giles	Labor	1st Albanese	Minister for Immigration, Citizenship and Multicultural Affairs	1 June 2022	29 July 2024	2 years, 58 days

== Assistant ministers ==
=== Assistant ministers for multicultural affairs ===
The following individuals served as the Parliamentary Secretary or Assistant Minister for Citizenship, Customs and Multicultural Affairs, or any precedent titles:

Order	Minister	Party affiliation	Ministry	Ministerial title	Term start	Term end	Term in office
1	Mick Young	Labor	3rd Hawke	Minister Assisting the Prime Minister for Multicultural Affairs	24 July 1987	12 February 1988	203 days
2	Clyde Holding	Labor	3rd Hawke	Minister Assisting the Prime Minister for Multicultural Affairs	15 February 1988	2 September 1988	200 days
3	Robert Ray	Labor	3rd Hawke	Minister Assisting the Prime Minister for Multicultural Affairs	2 September 1988	4 April 1990	1 year, 214 days
3	Clyde Holding	Labor	3rd Hawke	Minister Assisting the Minister for Immigration, Local Government and Ethnic Affairs	2 September 1988	4 April 1990	1 year, 214 days
4	Gerry Hand	Labor	4th Hawke	Minister Assisting the Prime Minister for Multicultural Affairs	4 April 1990	24 March 1993	2 years, 354 days
4	Gerry Hand	Labor	1st Keating	Minister Assisting the Prime Minister for Multicultural Affairs	4 April 1990	24 March 1993	2 years, 354 days
5	Nick Bolkus	Labor	2nd Keating	Minister Assisting the Prime Minister for Multicultural Affairs	24 March 1993	11 March 1996	2 years, 353 days
6	Kay Patterson	Liberal	2nd Howard	Parliamentary Secretary to the Minister for Immigration and Multicultural Affairs	21 October 1998	26 November 2001	3 years, 36 days
7	Bruce Billson	Liberal	4th Howard	Parliamentary Secretary to the Minister for Immigration and Multicultural and Indigenous Affairs	6 July 2005	27 January 2006	205 days
8	Andrew Robb	Liberal	4th Howard	Parliamentary Secretary to the Minister for Immigration and Multicultural Affairs	27 January 2006	30 January 2007	1 year, 3 days
9	Laurie Ferguson	Labor	1st Rudd	Parliamentary Secretary for Multicultural Affairs and Settlement Services	3 December 2007	14 September 2010	2 years, 285 days
9	Laurie Ferguson	Labor	1st Gillard	Parliamentary Secretary for Multicultural Affairs and Settlement Services	3 December 2007	14 September 2010	2 years, 285 days
10	Kate Lundy	Labor	2nd Gillard	Parliamentary Secretary for Immigration and Multicultural Affairs	16 February 2011	5 March 2012	1 year, 18 days
11	Matt Thistlethwaite	Labor	2nd Gillard	Parliamentary Secretary for Multicultural Affairs	25 March 2013	18 September 2013	177 days
11	Matt Thistlethwaite	Labor	2nd Rudd	Parliamentary Secretary for Multicultural Affairs	25 March 2013	18 September 2013	177 days
12	Concetta Fierravanti-Wells	Liberal	1st Turnbull	Assistant Minister for Multicultural Affairs	21 September 2015	18 February 2016	150 days
13	Craig Laundy	Liberal	1st Turnbull	Assistant Minister for Multicultural Affairs	18 February 2016	19 July 2016	152 days
14	Zed Seselja	Liberal	2nd Turnbull	Assistant Minister for Social Services and Multicultural Affairs	19 July 2016	20 December 2017	1 year, 155 days
15	Jason Wood	Liberal	2nd Morrison	Assistant Minister for Customs, Community Safety and Multicultural Affairs	29 May 2019	23 May 2022	2 years, 359 days
16	Julian Hill	Labor	1st Albanese	Assistant Minister for Citizenship and Multicultural Affairs	29 July 2024	Incumbent	2 years, 40 days
16	Julian Hill	Labor	2nd Albanese	Assistant Minister for Citizenship, Customs and Multicultural Affairs	29 July 2024	Incumbent	2 years, 40 days
