= Peacock shadow ministry (1983–85) =

Shadow ministry of the Australian opposition, from 1983 to 1985

The Shadow Ministry of Andrew Peacock was the opposition Coalition shadow ministry of Australia from 16 March 1983 to 5 September 1985, opposing Bob Hawke's Labor government.

The shadow ministry is a group of senior opposition spokespeople who form an alternative ministry to the government's, whose members shadow or mark each individual Minister or portfolio of the Government.

Andrew Peacock became Leader of the Opposition upon his election as leader of the Liberal Party of Australia on 11 March 1983 and appointed a new Shadow Ministry.

== First arrangement ==
The following were members of the Shadow Ministry:

Colour key
(for political parties)
Liberal
National
Country Liberal

Shadow Minister	Portfolio
Andrew Peacock MP	Leader of the Opposition; Leader of the Liberal Party
John Howard MP	Deputy Leader of the Opposition; Shadow Treasurer; Deputy Leader of the Liberal Party
Doug Anthony MP	Leader of the National Party (to 17 January 1984); Shadow Minister for Trade (to 17 January 1984)
Ian Sinclair MP	Leader of the National Party (from 18 January 1984); Deputy Leader of the National Party (to 17 January 1984); Shadow Minister for Defence
Ralph Hunt MP	Shadow Minister for Trade (from 18 January 1984); Deputy Leader of the National Party (from 18 January 1984)
Senator Fred Chaney	Leader of the Opposition in the Senate; Shadow Minister for Energy and Resources
Senator Peter Durack	Deputy Leader of the Opposition in the Senate; Shadow Attorney-General
Senator Peter Baume	Shadow Minister for Education and Youth
Ray Braithwaite MP	Shadow Minister for Local Government and Northern Development
Jim Carlton MP	Shadow Minister for Health
David Connolly MP	Shadow Minister for Environment and Public Administration
David Connolly MP	Shadow Minister for Environment and Public Administration
Harold Edwards MP	Shadow Minister for Science and Technology
Wal Fife MP	Shadow Minister for Housing and Construction
Peter Fisher MP	Shadow Minister for Sport and Recreation
Senator Margaret Guilfoyle	Shadow Minister for Taxation
Steele Hall MP	Shadow Special Minister of State
Michael Hodgman MP	Shadow Minister for Immigration and Ethnic Affairs
Bruce Lloyd MP	Shadow Minister for Communications
Stephen Lusher MP	Shadow Minister for Transport
Michael MacKellar MP	Shadow Minister for Foreign Affairs
Ian Macphee MP	Shadow Minister for Employment, Industrial Relations, Status of Women
Tom McVeigh MP	Shadow Minister for Primary Industry
Senator Tony Messner	Shadow Minister for Social Security
John Moore MP	Shadow Minister for Finance
James Porter MP	Shadow Minister for Aboriginal Affairs
Senator Peter Rae	Shadow Minister for Industry and Commerce
Philip Ruddock MP	Shadow Minister for Australian Capital Territory and the Public Service
Douglas Scott MP	Shadow Minister for Veterans' Affairs
Roger Shipton MP	Shadow Minister for Small Business and Tourism
John Spender MP	Shadow Minister for Aviation and Defence Support
Senator Kathy Sullivan	Shadow Minister for Administrative Services and Home Affairs

== Second arrangement ==
The Shadow Ministry was reshuffled on 14 December 1984 following the 1984 Australian federal election.

Colour key
(for political parties)
Liberal
National
Country Liberal

Shadow Minister	Portfolio
Andrew Peacock MP	Leader of the Opposition; Leader of the Liberal Party
John Howard MP	Deputy Leader of the Opposition; Shadow Treasurer; Deputy Leader of the Liberal Party
Ian Sinclair MP	Leader of the National Party; Shadow Minister for Defence
Ralph Hunt MP	Shadow Minister for Primary Industry; Deputy Leader of the National Party
Senator Fred Chaney	Leader of the Opposition in the Senate; Shadow Minister for Industry, Technology and Commerce
Senator Peter Durack	Deputy Leader of the Opposition in the Senate; Shadow Minister for Energy and Resources
Senator Peter Baume	Shadow Minister for Education; Shadow Minister for the Status of Women
Charles Blunt MP	Shadow Minister for Sport and Recreation
Ray Braithwaite MP	Shadow Minister for Social Security
Neil Brown MP	Shadow Attorney-General
Senator Stan Collard	Shadow Minister for Veterans' Affairs
David Connolly MP	Shadow Minister for Environment, Public Administration, Arts and Heritage
Paul Everingham MP	Shadow Minister for Local Government; Shadow Minister for Northern Development
Michael Hodgman MP	Shadow Minister for Housing and Construction
Senator Austin Lewis	Shadow Minister for Territories; Shadow Minister for the Australian Capital Territory
Bruce Lloyd MP	Shadow Minister for Transport and Aviation
Michael MacKellar MP	Shadow Special Minister of State; Shadow Minister for Science
Ian Macphee MP	Shadow Minister for Foreign Affairs
Tom McVeigh MP	Shadow Minister for Trade
Senator Tony Messner	Shadow Minister for Community Services
John Moore MP	Shadow Minister for Communications
James Porter MP	Shadow Minister for Health
Senator Peter Rae	Shadow Minister for Finance
Philip Ruddock MP	Shadow Minister for Immigration and Ethnic Affairs
Peter Shack MP	Shadow Minister for Employment, Youth and Industrial Relations
Roger Shipton MP	Shadow Minister for Aboriginal Affairs
Wilson Tuckey MP	Shadow Minister for Administrative Services and Small Business

== See also ==
- Fourth Fraser Ministry
- Howard shadow ministry (1985–89)
- First Hawke Ministry
- Second Hawke Ministry
