= Howard shadow ministry (1985–89) =

Shadow ministry of the Australian opposition, from 1985 to 1989

The Shadow Ministry of John Howard was the opposition Coalition shadow ministry of Australia from 5 September 1985 to 9 May 1989, opposing Bob Hawke's Labor government.

The shadow ministry is a group of senior opposition spokespeople who form an alternative ministry to the government's, whose members shadow or mark each individual Minister or portfolio of the Government.

John Howard became Leader of the Opposition upon his election as leader of the Liberal Party of Australia on 5 September 1985 and appointed a new Shadow Ministry.

== First arrangement ==
The following were members of the Shadow Ministry:

Colour key
(for political parties)
Liberal
National
Country Liberal

Shadow Minister	Portfolio
John Howard MP	Leader of the Opposition; Leader of the Liberal Party
Neil Brown MP	Deputy Leader of the Opposition; Shadow Minister for Employment, Industrial Relations
Ian Sinclair MP	Leader of the National Party; Shadow Minister for Defence
Ralph Hunt MP	Deputy Leader of the National Party; Shadow Minister for Primary Industry
Senator Fred Chaney	Leader of the Opposition in the Senate; Shadow Minister for Industry, Technology and Commerce
Senator Peter Durack	Deputy Leader of the Opposition in the Senate; Shadow Minister for Energy and Resources
Senator Brian Archer	Shadow Special Minister of State; Shadow Minister for Science
Senator Peter Baume	Shadow Minister for Health
Julian Beale MP	Shadow Minister for Housing and Construction
Charles Blunt MP	Shadow Minister for Social Security
Ray Braithwaite MP	Shadow Minister for Trade
Alan Cadman MP	Shadow Minister for Immigration and Ethnic Affairs
Jim Carlton MP	Shadow Treasurer
Senator Stan Collard	Shadow Minister for Environment, Arts and Heritage
David Connolly MP	Shadow Minister for Aboriginal Affairs, Public Adminstration
Tim Fischer MP	Shadow Minister for Veterans' Affairs
Senator Austin Lewis	Shadow Minister for Territories; Shadow Minister for the Australian Capital Territory
Bruce Lloyd MP	Shadow Minister for Transport and Aviation
Ian Macphee MP	Shadow Minister for Communications
Tom McVeigh MP	Shadow Minister for Trade
Senator Tony Messner	Shadow Minister for Finance, Taxation
John Moore MP	Shadow Minister for Local Government, Northern Development
Andrew Peacock MP	Shadow Minister for Foreign Affairs
James Porter MP	Shadow Minister for Health
Peter Shack MP	Shadow Minister for Employment, Youth
John Spender MP	Shadow Attorney-General
Wilson Tuckey MP	Shadow Minister for Administrative Services and Small Business
Peter White MP	Shadow Minister for Tourism, Sport and Recreation

== Second arrangement ==
The National Party withdrew from the Coalition on 28 April 1987, resulting in a Liberal Party Shadow Ministry.

Colour key
(for political parties)
Liberal

Shadow Minister	Portfolio
John Howard MP	Leader of the Opposition; Leader of the Liberal Party
Neil Brown MP	Deputy Leader of the Opposition; Shadow Minister for Foreign Affairs
Senator Fred Chaney	Leader of the Opposition in the Senate; Shadow Minister for Employment, Industrial Relations
Senator Peter Durack	Deputy Leader of the Opposition in the Senate; Shadow Minister for Trade, Energy and Resources
Senator Brian Archer	Shadow Special Minister of State; Shadow Minister for Science
Senator Peter Baume	Shadow Minister for Community Services, Status of Women
Julian Beale MP	Shadow Minister for Communications
Alan Cadman MP	Shadow Minister for Immigration and Ethnic Affairs
Jim Carlton MP	Shadow Treasurer
David Connolly MP	Shadow Minister for Aboriginal Affairs, Public Adminstration
Alexander Downer MP	Shadow Minister for Environment, Arts and Heritage
Wal Fife MP	Shadow Minister for Primary Industry
Senator Austin Lewis	Shadow Minister for Local Government, Veterans Affairs; Shadow Minister for Territories; Shadow Minister for the Australian Capital Territory
Ian Macphee MP	Shadow Minister for Communications
Senator Tony Messner	Shadow Minister for Industry, Technology and Commerce
John Moore MP	Shadow Minister for Transport, Aviation, Business, Consumer Affairs
James Porter MP	Shadow Minister for Social Security, Family and Community Services
Peter Reith MP	Shadow Minister for Tourism, Sport and Recreation
Peter Shack MP	Shadow Minister for Employment, Youth
Senator Jim Short	Shadow Minister for Finance
John Spender MP	Shadow Attorney-General; Shadow Minister for the Status of Women
Wilson Tuckey MP	Shadow Minister for Housing, Small Business
Peter White MP	Shadow Minister for Defence, Northern Development

== Third arrangement ==
The Liberal/National Coalition Shadow Ministry was reformed on 14 August 1987 after the 1987 Australian federal election.

Colour key
(for political parties)
Liberal
National
Country Liberal

Shadow Minister	Portfolio
John Howard MP	Leader of the Opposition; Leader of the Liberal Party
Andrew Peacock MP	Deputy Leader of the Opposition; Shadow Treasurer
Ian Sinclair MP	Leader of the National Party; Shadow Minister for Trade, Resources
Bruce Lloyd MP	Deputy Leader of the National Party; Shadow Minister for Primary Industry
Senator Fred Chaney	Leader of the Opposition in the Senate; Shadow Minister for Industrial Relations
Senator Austin Lewis	Deputy Leader of the Opposition in the Senate; Shadow Minister for Industry, Technology and Commerce
Julian Beale MP	Shadow Minister for Transport, Aviation
Charles Blunt MP	Shadow Minister for Family and Community Services
Ray Braithwaite MP	Shadow Minister for Territories
Alan Cadman MP	Shadow Minister for Immigration and Ethnic Affairs
Jim Carlton MP	Shadow Minister for Education
David Connolly MP	Shadow Minister for Social Security
Wal Fife MP	Shadow Minister for Administrative Services
Tim Fischer MP	Shadow Minister for Veterans' Affairs
Senator Tony Messner	Shadow Minister for Communications
Chris Miles MP	Shadow Minister for Aboriginal Affairs
John Moore MP	Shadow Minister for Business, Consumer Affairs
James Porter MP	Shadow Minister for Housing, Public Administration
Senator Chris Puplick	Shadow Minister for Environment, Arts, Bicentenary
Peter Reith MP	Shadow Attorney-General
Peter Shack MP	Shadow Minister for Employment and Training, Youth
John Sharp MP	Shadow Minister for Tourism, Sport
Senator Jim Short	Shadow Minister for Home Affairs
Warwick Smith MP	Shadow Minister for Science, Energy
John Spender MP	Shadow Attorney-General
Senator John Stone	Shadow Minister for Finance (until 14 September 1988)
Wilson Tuckey MP	Shadow Minister for Health
Senator Amanda Vanstone	Shadow Minister for the Australian Capital Territory; Special Ministry of State; Shadow Minister for the Status of Women
Peter White MP	Shadow Minister for Defence

== Fourth arrangement ==
The Shadow Ministry was reshuffled on 16 September 1988 following the 1988 Australian referendum.

Colour key
(for political parties)
Liberal
National
Country Liberal

Shadow Minister	Portfolio
John Howard MP	Leader of the Opposition; Leader of the Liberal Party
Andrew Peacock MP	Deputy Leader of the Opposition; Shadow Treasurer
Ian Sinclair MP	Leader of the National Party; Shadow Minister for Trade, Resources
Bruce Lloyd MP	Deputy Leader of the National Party; Shadow Minister for Primary Industry
Senator Fred Chaney	Leader of the Opposition in the Senate; Shadow Minister for Industry, Technology and Commerce
Senator Austin Lewis	Deputy Leader of the Opposition in the Senate; Shadow Minister for Communications
Julian Beale MP	Shadow Minister for Education
Charles Blunt MP	Shadow Minister for Transport, Aviation
Senator Ron Boswell	Shadow Minister for Regional Development, External Territories
Ray Braithwaite MP	Shadow Minister for Community Services, Aged Care
Neil Brown MP	Shadow Attorney-General
Alan Cadman MP	Shadow Minister for Immigration and Ethnic Affairs
Jim Carlton MP	Shadow Minister for Education
David Connolly MP	Shadow Minister for Superannuation, Retirement Income, Social Security
Alexander Downer MP	Shadow Minister for Housing, Small Business
Wal Fife MP	Shadow Minister for Administrative Services
Tim Fischer MP	Shadow Minister for Veterans' Affairs
John Hewson MP	Shadow Minister for Finance
Senator Robert Hill	Shadow Minister for the Australian Capital Territory; Shadow Minister for Justice, Status of Women
Peter McGauran MP	Shadow Minister for Energy, Science
Senator Tony Messner	Shadow Minister for Public Administration, Local Government, Federal Affairs
Chris Miles MP	Shadow Minister for Aboriginal Affairs
John Moore MP	Shadow Minister for Business, Consumer Affairs
Senator Jocelyn Newman	Shadow Minister for Defence Science and Personnel
Senator Chris Puplick	Shadow Minister for Environment, Arts, Bicentenary
Peter Reith MP	Shadow Minister for Industrial Relations
Peter Shack MP	Shadow Minister for Health
John Sharp MP	Shadow Minister for Tourism, Sport, Youth
Senator Jim Short	Shadow Minister for Home Affairs
John Spender MP	Shadow Minister for Foreign Affairs
Wilson Tuckey MP	Shadow Minister for Employment and Training
Peter White MP	Shadow Minister for Defence

== See also ==
- Peacock shadow ministry (1989–90)
- Shadow Ministry of John Howard
- Second Hawke Ministry
- Third Hawke Ministry
