= Keating ministry =

Keating ministry may refer to:

- First Keating ministry
- Second Keating ministry
