= Peter Wight =

Peter Wight may refer to:

- Peter Bonnett Wight (1838–1925), American architect who worked in New York and Chicago
- P. A. L. Wight (Peter Albert Laing Wight, 1924–1998), British veterinary surgeon
- Peter Wight (cricketer) (1930–2015), Guyanese first-class cricketer who played for Somerset, Canterbury and British Guiana
- Peter Wight (actor) (born 1950), English film and television actor

== See also ==
- Peter White (disambiguation)
- Peter Wright (disambiguation)
