= Minister for Social Services =

Australian cabinet position

- Commonwealth Coat of Arms

- Flag of Australia

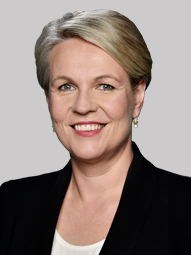
- Incumbent; Tanya Plibersek since 13 May 2025
- Department of Social Services
- Style: The Honourable
- Appointer: Governor-General; on the advice of the prime minister
- Inaugural holder: Frederick Stewart (as Minister for Social Services)
- Formation: 26 April 1939
- Website: ministers.dss.gov.au/tanya-plibersek

The Minister for Social Services is an Australian Government cabinet position which is currently held by Tanya Plibersek following her swearing-in on 13 May 2025 as a result of Anthony Albanese's Labor government being re-elected at the 2025 Australian federal election. The portfolio oversees social services, including mental health, families and children's policy, and support for carers and people with disabilities, and seniors.

== Portfolio ==
In the Government of Australia, the Ministers administer the portfolio through the Department of Social Services. Other portfolio bodies for which the Ministers are responsible include:

- Aged Care Standards and Accreditation Agency
- Australian Institute of Family Studies
- Commonwealth Advisory Committee on Homelessness
- Community and Disability Services Ministers' Conference
- Community Services Ministers' Advisory Council
- Emergency Relief State Advisory Committees
- National Childcare Accreditation Council Inc.
- National Disability Advisory Council
- National Disability Insurance Agency
- National Supported Accommodation Assistance Program (SAAP) Coordination and Development Committee (CAD) representatives and Information Sub-committee
- Social Security Appeals Tribunal

== List of ministers for social services ==
The following individuals have been appointed as Minister for Social Services, or any of its precedent titles:

Order	Minister	Party	Prime Minister	Title	Term start	Term end	Term in office
1	Frederick Stewart	United Australia	Menzies	Minister for Social Services	26 April 1939	29 August 1941	2 years, 164 days
1	Frederick Stewart	United Australia	Fadden	Minister for Social Services	29 August 1941	7 October 1941	2 years, 164 days
2	Jack Holloway	Labor	Curtin	Minister for Social Services	7 October 1941	21 September 1943	1 year, 349 days
3	James Fraser	Labor	Curtin	Minister for Social Services	21 September 1943	6 July 1945	2 years, 270 days
3	James Fraser	Labor	Forde	Minister for Social Services	6 July 1934	13 July 1945	2 years, 270 days
3	James Fraser	Labor	Chifley	Minister for Social Services	13 July 1945	18 June 1946	2 years, 270 days
4	Nick McKenna	Labor	Chifley	Minister for Social Services	18 June 1946	19 December 1949	3 years, 184 days
5	Bill Spooner	Liberal	Menzies	Minister for Social Services	19 December 1949	11 May 1951	1 year, 143 days
6	Athol Townley	Liberal	Menzies	Minister for Social Services	11 May 1951	9 July 1954	3 years, 59 days
7	William McMahon	Liberal	Menzies	Minister for Social Services	9 July 1954	28 February 1956	1 year, 234 days
8	Hugh Roberton	Country	Menzies	Minister for Social Services	28 February 1956	21 January 1965	8 years, 328 days
9	Reginald Swartz	Liberal	Menzies	Minister for Social Services	21 January 1965	22 February 1965	32 days
10	Ian Sinclair	Country	Menzies	Minister for Social Services	22 February 1965	26 January 1966	3 years, 6 days
10	Ian Sinclair	Country	Holt	Minister for Social Services	26 January 1966	19 December 1967	3 years, 6 days
10	Ian Sinclair	Country	McEwen	Minister for Social Services	19 December 1967	10 January 1968	3 years, 6 days
10	Ian Sinclair	Country	Gorton	Minister for Social Services	10 January 1968	28 February 1968	3 years, 6 days
11	Bill Wentworth	Liberal	Gorton	Minister for Social Services	28 February 1968	10 March 1971	4 years, 281 days
11	Bill Wentworth	Liberal	McMahon	Minister for Social Services	10 March 1971	5 December 1972	4 years, 281 days
12	Lance Barnard	Labor	Whitlam	Minister for Social Services	5 December 1972	19 December 1972	14 days
13	Don Grimes	Labor	Hawke	Minister for Community Services	13 December 1984	16 February 1987	2 years, 65 days
14	Chris Hurford	Labor	Hawke	Minister for Community Services	16 February 1987	24 July 1987	158 days
15	Neal Blewett	Labor	Hawke	Minister for Community Services and Health	24 July 1987	4 April 1990	2 years, 254 days
16	Brian Howe	Labor	Hawke	Minister for Community Services and Health	4 April 1990	7 June 1991	3 years, 355 days
16	Brian Howe	Labor	Hawke	Minister for Health, Housing and Community Services	7 June 1991	20 December 1991	3 years, 355 days
16	Brian Howe	Labor	Keating	Minister for Health, Housing and Community Services	20 December 1991	24 March 1993	3 years, 355 days
16	Brian Howe	Labor	Keating	Minister for Housing, Local Government and Community Services	24 March 1993	23 December 1993	3 years, 355 days
16	Brian Howe	Labor	Keating	Minister for Housing, Local Government and Human Services	23 December 1993	25 March 1994	3 years, 355 days
17	Carmen Lawrence	Labor	Keating	Minister for Human Services and Health	25 March 1994	11 March 1996	1 year, 352 days
18	Michael Wooldridge	Liberal	Howard	Minister for Health and Family Services	11 March 1996	21 October 1998	2 years, 224 days
19	Jocelyn Newman	Liberal	Howard	Minister for Family and Community Services	21 October 1998	30 January 2001	2 years, 101 days
20	Amanda Vanstone	Liberal	Howard	Minister for Family and Community Services	30 January 2001	7 October 2003	2 years, 250 days
21	Kay Patterson	Liberal	Howard	Minister for Family and Community Services	7 October 2003	27 January 2006	2 years, 112 days
22	Mal Brough	Liberal	Howard	Minister for Families and Community Services and Indigenous Affairs	27 January 2006	3 December 2007	1 year, 310 days
23	Jenny Macklin	Labor	Rudd	Minister for Families, Housing, Community Services and Indigenous Affairs	3 December 2007	24 June 2010	5 years, 289 days
23	Jenny Macklin	Labor	Gillard	Minister for Families, Housing, Community Services and Indigenous Affairs	24 June 2010	14 December 2011	5 years, 289 days
23	Jenny Macklin	Labor	Gillard	Minister for Families, Community Services and Indigenous Affairs	14 December 2011	27 June 2013	5 years, 289 days
23	Jenny Macklin	Labor	Rudd	Minister for Families, Community Services and Indigenous Affairs	27 June 2013	18 September 2013	5 years, 289 days
24	Kevin Andrews	Liberal	Abbott	Minister for Social Services	18 September 2013	23 December 2014	1 year, 96 days
25	Scott Morrison	Liberal	Abbott	Minister for Social Services	23 December 2014	15 September 2015	272 days
25	Scott Morrison	Liberal	Turnbull	Minister for Social Services	15 September 2015	21 September 2015	272 days
26	Christian Porter	Liberal	Turnbull	Minister for Social Services	21 September 2015	20 December 2017	2 years, 90 days
27	Dan Tehan	Liberal	Turnbull	Minister for Social Services	20 December 2017	28 August 2018	251 days
28	Paul Fletcher	Liberal	Morrison	Minister for Families and Social Services	28 August 2018	29 May 2019	274 days
29	Anne Ruston	Liberal	Morrison	Minister for Families and Social Services	29 May 2019	23 May 2022	2 years, 359 days
30	Amanda Rishworth	Labor	Albanese	Minister for Social Services	1 June 2022	13 May 2025	2 years, 346 days
31	Tanya Plibersek	Labor	Albanese	Minister for Social Services	13 May 2025	Incumbent	1 year, 125 days

== Assistant ministers ==
The following individuals have been appointed as Assistant Minister for Social Services, or any precedent titles:

Order	Minister	Party	Prime Minister	Title	Term start	Term end	Term in office
1	Concetta Fierravanti-Wells	Liberal	Abbott	Parliamentary Secretary to the Minister for Social Services	18 September 2013	21 September 2015	2 years, 3 days
2	Alan Tudge	Liberal	Turnbull	Assistant Minister for Social Services	30 September 2015	18 February 2016	141 days
3	Zed Seselja	Liberal	Turnbull	Assistant Minister for Social Services and Multicultural Affairs	18 July 2016	20 December 2017	1 year, 155 days
4	David Gillespie	National	Turnbull	Assistant Minister for Children and Families	20 December 2017	28 August 2018	251 days
5	Michelle Landry	National	Morrison	Assistant Minister for Children and Families	28 August 2018	23 May 2022	3 years, 268 days
6	Justine Elliot	Labor	Albanese	Assistant Minister for Social Services; Assistant Minister for the Prevention of Family Violence	1 June 2022	13 May 2025	2 years, 346 days
7	Ged Kearney	Labor	Albanese	Assistant Minister for Social Services; Assistant Minister for the Prevention of Family Violence	13 May 2025	Incumbent	1 year, 125 days

== Related ministerial portfolios ==
=== List of ministers for Government Services ===
There was a Minister for Social Services or Social Security continuously from 1939 to 1998, when service delivery was partially privatised and residual functions were transferred to the Minister for Finance and Administration. In 2004, the position of Minister for Human Services was recreated to handle the residual functions; Scott Morrison renamed the portfolio to Government Services in 2019.

The following individuals have been appointed as Minister for Government Services, or any precedent titles:

Order	Minister	Party affiliation	Prime Minister	Ministerial title	Term start	Term end	Term in office
1	Frederick Stewart	United Australia	Menzies	Minister for Social Services	26 April 1939	29 August 1941	2 years, 164 days
1	Frederick Stewart	United Australia	Fadden	Minister for Social Services	29 August 1941	7 October 1941	2 years, 164 days
2	Jack Holloway	Labor	Curtin	Minister for Social Services	7 October 1941	21 September 1943	1 year, 349 days
3	James Fraser	Labor	Curtin	Minister for Social Services	21 September 1943	6 July 1945	2 years, 270 days
3	James Fraser	Labor	Forde	Minister for Social Services	6 July 1945	13 July 1945	2 years, 270 days
3	James Fraser	Labor	Chifley	Minister for Social Services	13 July 1945	18 June 1946	2 years, 270 days
4	Nick McKenna	Labor	Chifley	Minister for Social Services	18 June 1946	19 December 1949	3 years, 184 days
5	Bill Spooner	Liberal	Menzies	Minister for Social Services	19 December 1949	11 May 1951	1 year, 143 days
6	Athol Townley	Liberal	Menzies	Minister for Social Services	11 May 1951	9 July 1954	3 years, 59 days
7	William McMahon	Liberal	Menzies	Minister for Social Services	9 July 1954	28 February 1956	1 year, 234 days
8	Hugh Roberton	Country	Menzies	Minister for Social Services	28 February 1956	21 January 1965	8 years, 328 days
9	Reginald Swartz	Liberal	Menzies	Minister for Social Services	21 January 1965	22 February 1965	32 days
10	Ian Sinclair	Country	Menzies	Minister for Social Services	22 February 1965	26 January 1966	3 years, 6 days
10	Ian Sinclair	Country	Holt	Minister for Social Services	26 January 1966	19 December 1967	3 years, 6 days
10	Ian Sinclair	Country	McEwen	Minister for Social Services	19 December 1967	10 January 1968	3 years, 6 days
10	Ian Sinclair	Country	Gorton	Minister for Social Services	10 January 1968	28 February 1968	3 years, 6 days
11	Bill Wentworth	Liberal	Gorton	Minister for Social Services	28 February 1968	10 March 1971	4 years, 281 days
11	Bill Wentworth	Liberal	McMahon	Minister for Social Services	10 March 1971	5 December 1972	4 years, 281 days
12	Lance Barnard	Labor	Whitlam	Minister for Social Services	5 December 1972	19 December 1972	14 days
13	Bill Hayden	Labor	Whitlam	Minister for Social Security	19 December 1972	6 June 1975	2 years, 169 days
14	John Wheeldon	Labor	Whitlam	Minister for Social Security	6 June 1975	11 November 1975	158 days
15	Don Chipp	Liberal	Fraser	Minister for Social Security	12 November 1975	22 December 1975	40 days
16	Margaret Guilfoyle	Liberal	Fraser	Minister for Social Security	22 December 1975	3 November 1980	4 years, 317 days
17	Fred Chaney	Liberal	Fraser	Minister for Social Security	3 November 1980	11 March 1983	2 years, 128 days
18	Don Grimes	Labor	Hawke	Minister for Social Security	11 March 1983	13 December 1984	1 year, 277 days
19	Brian Howe	Labor	Hawke	Minister for Social Security	13 December 1984	4 April 1990	5 years, 112 days
20	Graham Richardson	Labor	Hawke	Minister for Social Security	4 April 1990	20 December 1991	1 year, 267 days
20	Graham Richardson	Labor	Keating	Minister for Social Security	20 December 1991	27 December 1991	1 year, 267 days
21	Neal Blewett	Labor	Keating	Minister for Social Security	27 December 1991	24 March 1993	1 year, 87 days
22	Peter Baldwin	Labor	Keating	Minister for Social Security	24 March 1993	11 March 1996	2 years, 353 days
23	Jocelyn Newman	Liberal	Howard	Minister for Social Security	11 March 1996	21 October 1998	2 years, 224 days
24	Joe Hockey	Liberal	Howard	Minister for Human Services	26 October 2004	30 January 2007	2 years, 96 days
25	Ian Campbell	Liberal	Howard	Minister for Human Services	30 January 2007	9 March 2007	38 days
26	Chris Ellison	Liberal	Howard	Minister for Human Services	9 March 2007	3 December 2007	269 days
27	Joe Ludwig	Labor	Rudd	Minister for Human Services	3 December 2007	9 June 2009	1 year, 188 days
28	Chris Bowen	Labor	Rudd	Minister for Human Services	9 June 2009	24 June 2010	1 year, 97 days
28	Chris Bowen	Labor	Gillard	Minister for Human Services	24 June 2010	14 September 2010	1 year, 97 days
29	Tanya Plibersek	Labor	Gillard	Minister for Human Services	14 September 2010	14 December 2011	1 year, 91 days
30	Brendan O'Connor	Labor	Gillard	Minister for Human Services	14 December 2011	5 March 2012	82 days
31	Kim Carr	Labor	Gillard	Minister for Human Services	5 March 2012	23 March 2013	1 year, 18 days
32	Jan McLucas	Labor	Gillard	Minister for Human Services	23 March 2013	27 June 2013	179 days
32	Jan McLucas	Labor	Rudd	Minister for Human Services	27 June 2013	18 September 2013	179 days
33	Marise Payne	Liberal	Abbott	Minister for Human Services	18 September 2013	15 September 2015	2 years, 3 days
33	Marise Payne	Liberal	Turnbull	Minister for Human Services	15 September 2015	21 September 2015	2 years, 3 days
34	Stuart Robert	Liberal	Turnbull	Minister for Human Services	21 September 2015	12 February 2016	144 days
35	Alan Tudge	Liberal	Turnbull	Minister for Human Services	18 February 2016	20 December 2017	1 year, 305 days
36	Michael Keenan	Liberal	Turnbull	Minister for Human Services	20 December 2017	24 August 2018	1 year, 160 days
36	Michael Keenan	Liberal	Morrison	Minister for Human Services	24 August 2018	29 May 2019	1 year, 160 days
(34)	Stuart Robert	Liberal	Morrison	Minister for Government Services	29 May 2019	30 March 2021	1 year, 305 days
37	Linda Reynolds	Liberal	Morrison	Minister for Government Services	30 March 2021	23 May 2022	1 year, 56 days
38	Bill Shorten	Labor	Albanese	Minister for Government Services	1 June 2022	20 January 2025	2 years, 233 days
39	Katy Gallagher	Labor	Albanese	Minister for Government Services	20 January 2025	Incumbent	1 year, 238 days

=== List of ministers for housing ===
The following individuals have been appointed as Minister for Housing, or any of its precedent titles:

Order	Minister	Party	Ministry	Title	Term start	Term end	Term in office
1	Bert Lazzarini	Labor	1st Chifley	Minister for Works and Housing	13 July 1945	1 November 1946	1 year, 111 days
2	Nelson Lemmon	Labor	2nd Chifley	Minister for Works and Housing	1 November 1946	19 December 1949	3 years, 48 days
3	Richard Casey	Liberal	4th Menzies	Minister for Works and Housing	19 December 1949	11 May 1951	1 year, 143 days
4	Wilfrid Kent Hughes	Liberal	5th Menzies	Minister for Works and Housing	11 May 1951	4 June 1952	1 year, 24 days
5	Les Bury	Liberal	10th Menzies	Minister for Housing	18 December 1963	26 January 1966	2 years, 39 days
6	Annabelle Rankin	Liberal	1st Holt; 2nd Holt; McEwen; 1st Gorton; 2nd Gorton; McMahon	Minister for Housing	26 January 1966	22 March 1971	5 years, 55 days
7	Kevin Cairns	Liberal	McMahon	Minister for Housing	22 March 1971	5 December 1972	1 year, 258 days
8	Gough Whitlam^{1}	Labor	1st Whitlam	Minister for Housing	5 December 1972	19 December 1972	14 days
9	Les Johnson	Labor	2nd Whitlam	Minister for Housing	19 December 1972	30 November 1973	2 years, 169 days
9	Les Johnson	Labor	2nd Whitlam; 3rd Whitlam	Minister for Housing and Construction	30 November 1973	6 June 1975	2 years, 169 days
10	Joe Riordan	Labor	3rd Whitlam	Minister for Housing and Construction	6 June 1975	11 November 1975	158 days
11	John Carrick	Liberal	1st Fraser	Minister for Housing and Construction	11 November 1975	22 December 1975	41 days
12	Ivor Greenwood	Liberal	2nd Fraser	Minister for Environment, Housing and Community Development	22 December 1975	8 July 1976	199 days
13	Kevin Newman	Liberal	2nd Fraser	Minister for Environment, Housing and Community Development	8 July 1976	20 December 1977	1 year, 165 days
14	Ray Groom	Liberal	3rd Fraser	Minister for Environment, Housing and Community Development	20 December 1977	5 December 1978	2 years, 319 days
14	Ray Groom	Liberal	3rd Fraser	Minister for Housing and Construction	5 December 1978	3 November 1980	2 years, 319 days
15	Tom McVeigh	National Country	4th Fraser	Minister for Housing and Construction	3 November 1980	7 May 1982	1 year, 185 days
16	Chris Hurford	Labor	1st Hawke	Minister for Housing and Construction	11 March 1983	13 December 1984	1 year, 277 days
17	Stewart West	Labor	2nd Hawke	Minister for Housing and Construction	13 December 1984	24 July 1987	2 years, 223 days
18	Peter Morris	Labor	3rd Hawke	Minister for Housing and Aged Care	19 January 1988	15 February 1988	27 days
19	Peter Staples	Labor	3rd Hawke; 4th Hawke	Minister for Housing and Aged Care	15 February 1988	7 May 1990	2 years, 81 days
20	Brian Howe	Labor	4th Hawke	Minister for Community Services and Health	7 May 1990	7 June 1991	5 years, 309 days
20	Brian Howe	Labor	4th Hawke; 1st Keating	Minister for Health, Housing and Community Services	7 June 1991	24 March 1993	5 years, 309 days
20	Brian Howe	Labor	2nd Keating	Minister for Housing, Local Government and Community Services	24 March 1993	23 December 1993	5 years, 309 days
20	Brian Howe	Labor	2nd Keating	Minister for Housing, Local Government and Human Services	23 December 1993	25 March 1994	5 years, 309 days
20	Brian Howe	Labor	2nd Keating	Minister for Housing and Regional Development	25 March 1994	11 March 1996	5 years, 309 days
21	Tanya Plibersek	Labor	1st Rudd; 1st Gillard	Minister for Housing	3 December 2007	14 September 2010	2 years, 285 days
22	Mark Arbib	Labor	2nd Gillard	Minister for Social Housing and Homelessness	14 September 2010	14 December 2011	1 year, 91 days
23	Robert McClelland	Labor	2nd Gillard	Minister for Housing	14 December 2011	5 March 2012	82 days
24	Brendan O'Connor	Labor	2nd Gillard	Minister for Housing	5 March 2012	4 February 2013	336 days
25	Mark Butler	Labor	2nd Gillard	Minister for Housing and Homelessness	4 February 2013	1 July 2013	147 days
26	Julie Collins	Labor	2nd Rudd	Minister for Housing and Homelessness	1 July 2013	18 September 2013	79 days
27	Michael Sukkar	Liberal	2nd Morrison	Minister for Housing	29 May 2019	23 May 2022	2 years, 359 days
(26)	Julie Collins	Labor	Albanese	Minister for Housing	1 June 2022	29 July 2024	2 years, 58 days
28	Clare O'Neil	Labor	Albanese	Minister for Housing	29 July 2024	Incumbent	2 years, 48 days

Notes

^{1} Whitlam was one of a two-man ministry consisting of himself and Lance Barnard for two weeks until the full ministry was announced.

=== List of ministers for aged care ===
The following individuals have been appointed as the Minister for Aged Care and Seniors, or any of its precedent titles. Ministers for aged care or ageing were appointed from 1988 to 1993 and again from 1998 to 2013. The portfolio gained a mental health component in 2010. The latter returned to the health portfolio in 2013, with ageing moving to social services. The following individuals have been appointed as Minister for Mental Health and Ageing, or any of its precedent titles: The Turnbull government transferred the aged care portfolio back to the Department of Health in October 2015. The position is a separate role that supplements the cabinet role of the Minister for Health and Aged Care. Between January 2017 and January 2025, it was an outer ministry role. The role was briefly made a Cabinet of Australia role in the first Albanese ministry from January to May 2025, before it returned to the outer ministry in May 2025 with the swearing-in of the second Albanese ministry.

Order	Minister	Party	Prime Minister	Title	Term start	Term end	Term in office
1	Peter Morris	Labor	Hawke	Minister for Housing and Aged Care	19 January 1988	15 February 1988	27 days
2	Peter Staples	Labor	Hawke	Minister for Housing and Aged Care	15 February 1988	7 May 1990	5 years, 64 days
2	Peter Staples	Labor	Hawke	Minister for Aged, Family and Health Services	7 May 1990	20 December 1991	5 years, 64 days
2	Peter Staples	Labor	Keating	Minister for Aged, Family and Health Services	20 December 1991	24 March 1993	5 years, 64 days
3	Bronwyn Bishop	Liberal	Howard	Minister for Aged Care	21 October 1998	26 November 2001	3 years, 36 days
4	Kevin Andrews	Liberal	Howard	Minister for Ageing	26 November 2001	7 October 2003	1 year, 315 days
5	Julie Bishop	Liberal	Howard	Minister for Ageing	7 October 2003	27 January 2006	2 years, 112 days
6	Santo Santoro	Liberal	Howard	Minister for Ageing	27 January 2006	21 March 2007	1 year, 53 days
7	Christopher Pyne	Liberal	Howard	Minister for Ageing	21 March 2007	3 December 2007	257 days
8	Justine Elliot	Labor	Rudd	Minister for Ageing	3 December 2007	28 June 2010	2 years, 207 days
9	Mark Butler	Labor	Gillard	Minister for Mental Health and Ageing	28 June 2010	1 July 2013	3 years, 3 days
10	Jacinta Collins	Labor	Rudd	Minister for Mental Health and Ageing	1 July 2013	18 September 2013	79 days
11	Sussan Ley	Liberal	Turnbull	Minister for Aged Care	30 September 2015	19 July 2016	1 year, 105 days
11	Sussan Ley	Liberal	Turnbull	Minister for Health and Ageing	19 July 2016	13 January 2017	1 year, 105 days
(acting)	Arthur Sinodinos	Liberal	Turnbull	Minister for Health and Ageing	13 January 2017	24 January 2017	11 days
12	Ken Wyatt	Liberal	Turnbull	Minister for Aged Care	24 January 2017	28 August 2018	2 years, 125 days
12	Ken Wyatt	Liberal	Morrison	Minister for Senior Australians and Aged Care	28 August 2018	29 May 2019	2 years, 125 days
13	Richard Colbeck	Liberal	Morrison	Minister for Aged Care and Senior Australians	29 May 2019	22 December 2020	2 years, 359 days
13	Richard Colbeck	Liberal	Morrison	Minister for Senior Australians and Aged Care Services	22 December 2020	23 May 2022	2 years, 359 days
(9)	Mark Butler	Labor	Albanese	Minister for Health and Aged Care	1 June 2022	13 May 2025	4 years, 106 days
(9)	Mark Butler	Labor	Albanese	Minister for Health and Ageing	13 May 2025	Incumbent	4 years, 106 days
14	Anika Wells	Labor	Albanese	Minister for Aged Care	1 June 2022	13 May 2025	2 years, 346 days
15	Sam Rae	Labor	Albanese	Minister for Aged Care and Seniors	13 May 2025	Incumbent	1 year, 125 days

== Former portfolio ministers ==
=== List of ministers for family services ===
Order	Minister	Party	Prime Minister	Title	Term start	Term end	Term in office
1	Peter Staples	Labor	Hawke	Minister for Aged, Family and Health Services	7 May 1990	20 December 1991	2 years, 321 days
1	Peter Staples	Labor	Keating	Minister for Aged, Family and Health Services	20 December 1991	24 March 1993	2 years, 321 days
2	Rosemary Crowley	Labor	Keating	Minister for Family Services	24 March 1993	11 March 1996	2 years, 353 days
3	Michael Wooldridge	Liberal	Howard	Minister for Health and Family Services	11 March 1996	21 October 1998	2 years, 224 days
4	Jocelyn Newman	Liberal	Howard	Minister for Family and Community Services	21 October 1998	30 January 2001	2 years, 101 days
5	Amanda Vanstone	Liberal	Howard	Minister for Family and Community Services	30 January 2001	7 October 2003	2 years, 250 days
6	Kay Patterson	Liberal	Howard	Minister for Family and Community Services	7 October 2003	27 January 2006	2 years, 112 days
7	Mal Brough	Liberal	Howard	Minister for Families and Community Services and Indigenous Affairs	27 January 2006	3 December 2007	1 year, 310 days
8	Jenny Macklin	Labor	Rudd	Minister for Families, Housing, Community Services and Indigenous Affairs	3 December 2007	24 June 2010	5 years, 289 days
8	Jenny Macklin	Labor	Gillard	Minister for Families, Housing, Community Services and Indigenous Affairs	24 June 2010	14 December 2011	5 years, 289 days
8	Jenny Macklin	Labor	Gillard	Minister for Families, Community Services and Indigenous Affairs	14 December 2011	27 June 2013	5 years, 289 days
8	Jenny Macklin	Labor	Rudd	Minister for Families, Community Services and Indigenous Affairs	27 June 2013	18 September 2013	5 years, 289 days

=== List of ministers for community services ===
A separate outer ministry role of the Minister for Community Services existed between January 2006 and December 2007, supplementing the cabinet role of the Minister for Families, Community Services and Indigenous Affairs.

Order	Minister	Party	Prime Minister	Title	Term start	Term end	Term in office
1	Don Grimes	Labor	Hawke	Minister for Community Services	13 December 1984	16 February 1987	2 years, 65 days
2	Chris Hurford	Labor	Hawke	Minister for Community Services	16 February 1987	24 July 1987	158 days
3	Neal Blewett	Labor	Hawke	Minister for Community Services and Health	24 July 1987	4 April 1990	2 years, 254 days
4	Brian Howe	Labor	Hawke	Minister for Community Services and Health	4 April 1990	7 June 1991	3 years, 263 days
4	Brian Howe	Labor	Hawke	Minister for Health, Housing and Community Services	7 June 1991	20 December 1991	3 years, 263 days
4	Brian Howe	Labor	Keating	Minister for Health, Housing and Community Services	20 December 1991	24 March 1993	3 years, 263 days
4	Brian Howe	Labor	Keating	Minister for Housing, Local Government and Community Services	24 March 1993	23 December 1993	3 years, 263 days
5	Warren Truss	National	Howard	Minister for Community Services	21 October 1998	20 July 1999	272 days
6	Larry Anthony	National	Howard	Minister for Community Services	20 July 1999	26 November 2001	2 years, 129 days
7	John Cobb	National	Howard	Minister for Community Services	27 January 2006	30 January 2007	1 year, 3 days
8	Nigel Scullion	National	Howard	Minister for Community Services	30 January 2007	3 December 2007	307 days
9	Jenny Macklin	Labor	Rudd	Minister for Families, Housing, Community Services and Indigenous Affairs	3 December 2007	24 June 2010	4 years, 11 days
9	Jenny Macklin	Labor	Gillard	Minister for Families, Housing, Community Services and Indigenous Affairs	24 June 2010	14 December 2011	4 years, 11 days
10	Julie Collins	Labor	Gillard	Minister for Community Services	14 December 2011	27 June 2013	1 year, 278 days
10	Julie Collins	Labor	Rudd	Minister for Community Services	27 June 2013	18 September 2013	1 year, 278 days
11	Mitch Fifield	Liberal	Abbott	Assistant Minister for Social Services	18 September 2013	15 September 2015	2 years, 3 days
11	Mitch Fifield	Liberal	Turnbull	Assistant Minister for Social Services	15 September 2015	21 September 2015	2 years, 3 days

== See also ==
- Minister for Families and Communities (New South Wales)
  - Minister for Mental Health (New South Wales)
- Minister for Mental Health (Western Australia)
- Minister for Families and Children (Victoria)
  - Minister for Mental Health (Victoria)
