= Peter White =

Peter White may refer to:

== Arts and entertainment ==
- Peter White (actor) (1937–2023), American actor
- Peter White (broadcaster) (born 1947), British broadcast journalist and radio presenter
- Peter White (musician) (born 1954), British smooth jazz guitarist
- Peter White (professor) (born 1942), professor of classical languages and literature at the University of Chicago
- Peter Gilbert White (1937–2007), English cathedral organist, who served in Leicester Cathedral
- Peter V. White, American film editor
- Peter White (St. Elsewhere), a character on the 1980s hospital drama St. Elsewhere
- Pete White (The Venture Bros.), a character on the animated television series The Venture Bros.

== Politics ==
- Peter White (Australian politician, born 1936) (1936–2005), member of the Australian House of Representatives, and member of the Queensland Legislative Assembly
- Peter White (Australian politician, born 1824) (1824–1901), member of the Queensland Legislative Assembly, Australia
- Peter White (Canadian politician) (1838–1906), Canadian parliamentarian
- Peter White (Michigan politician) (1830–1908), American businessman and philanthropist from Marquette, Michigan
- Peter J. White, senior policy advisor to President Trump

== Sports ==
- Peter White (footballer) (1970–1996), Australian rules footballer
- Peter White (ice hockey) (born 1969), retired Canadian professional ice hockey player
- Peter White (sprinter) (born 1897), American sprinter, 2nd in the 100 yards at the 1918 USA Outdoor Track and Field Championships

== Other ==
- Peter White (Royal Navy officer) (1919–2010)

== See also ==
- Peter Wight (disambiguation)
