= Fourth Hawke ministry =

57th ministry of government of Australia

- 57th Ministry of Australia

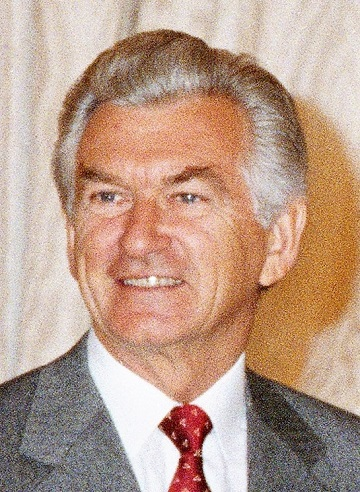
- Bob Hawke Paul Keating
- Date formed: 4 April 1990
- Date dissolved: 20 December 1991

People and organisations
- Monarch: Elizabeth II
- Governor-General: Bill Hayden
- Prime Minister: Bob Hawke
- Deputy Prime Minister: Paul Keating; Brian Howe
- No. of ministers: 31 (plus 4 Parliamentary Secretaries)
- Member party: Labor
- Status in legislature: Majority government
- Opposition party: Liberal–National coalition
- Opposition leader: John Hewson

History
- Election: 24 March 1990
- Legislature term: 36th
- Predecessor: Third Hawke ministry
- Successor: First Keating ministry

The fourth Hawke ministry (Labor) was the 57th ministry of the Government of Australia. It was led by the country's 23rd Prime Minister, Bob Hawke. The fourth Hawke ministry succeeded the third Hawke ministry, which dissolved on 4 April 1990 following the federal election that took place on 24 March. The ministry was replaced by the first Keating ministry on 20 December 1991 following the resignation of Hawke as Prime Minister after a successful leadership challenge by Paul Keating.

== Cabinet ==
Party	Minister	Portrait	Portfolio
Labor	Bob Hawke (1929–2019) MP for Wills (1980–1992)		Prime Minister; Leader of the Labor Party (to 19 December 1991); Treasurer (from 3 June 1991 to 4 June 1991)
Labor	Paul Keating (1944-) MP for Blaxland (1969–1996)		Deputy Prime Minister (to 3 June 1991); Leader of the Labor Party (from 19 December 1991); Deputy Leader of the Labor Party (to 3 June 1991); Treasurer (to 3 June 1991); Minister assisting the Prime Minister for Commonwealth-State Relations (to 3 June 1991)
Labor	John Button (1933–2008) Senator for Victoria (1974–1993)		Leader of the Government in the Senate; Minister for Industry, Technology and Commerce
Labor	Gareth Evans (1944–) Senator for Victoria (1978–1996)		Minister for Foreign Affairs and Trade
Labor	Neal Blewett (1933–) MP for Bonython (1977–1994)		Minister for Trade Negotiations (to 1 February 1991); Minister for Trade and Overseas Development (from 1 February 1991); Minister assisting the Minister for Industry, Technology and Commerce; Minister assisting the Minister for Primary Industries and Energy
Labor	Ralph Willis (1938–) MP for Gellibrand (1972–1998)		Minister for Finance (to 9 December 1991); Treasurer (from 9 December 1991)
Labor	Michael Duffy (1938–) MP for Holt (1980–1996)		Attorney-General
Labor	John Dawkins (1947–) MP for Fremantle (1977–1994)		Minister for Employment, Education and Training
Labor	Kim Beazley (1948–) MP for Swan (1980–1996)		Minister for Transport and Communications (to 9 December 1991); Vice-President of the Executive Council (to 1 February 1991); Minister for Finance (from 9 December 1991); Leader of the House
Labor	John Kerin (1937–2023) MP for Werriwa (1978–1993)		Minister for Primary Industries and Energy (to 4 June 1991); Treasurer (from 4 June 1991 to 9 December 1991); Minister for Transport and Communications (from 9 December 1991)
Labor	Brian Howe (1936–) MP for Batman (1977–1996)		Deputy Prime Minister (from 3 June 1991); Deputy Leader of the Labor Party (from 3 June 1991); Minister for Community Services and Health (to 7 June 1991); Minister for Health, Housing and Community Services (from 7 June 1991); Minister assisting the Prime Minister for Social Justice; Minister assisting the Prime Minister for Commonwealth-State Relations (from 4 June 1991)
Labor	Graham Richardson (1949–2025) Senator for New South Wales (1983–1994)		Minister for Social Security; Vice-President of the Executive Council (from 1 February 1991)
Labor	Robert Ray (1947–) Senator for Victoria (1981–2008)		Minister for Defence; Manager of Government Business in the Senate (to 4 June 1991)
Labor	Gerry Hand (1942–2023) MP for Melbourne (1983–1993)		Minister for Immigration, Local Government and Ethnic Affairs; Minister assisting the Prime Minister for Multicultural Affairs
Labor	Ros Kelly (1948–) MP for Canberra (1980–1995)		Minister for the Arts, Sport, the Environment, Tourism and Territories
Labor	Peter Cook (1943–2005) Senator for Western Australia (1983–2005)		Minister for Industrial Relations; Minister assisting the Prime Minister for Public Service Matters
Labor	Nick Bolkus (1950–2025) Senator for South Australia (1981–2005)		Minister for Administrative Services
Labor	Simon Crean (1949–2023) MP for Hotham (1990–2013) (in Cabinet from 4 June 1991)		Minister for Science and Technology (to 4 June 1991); Minister assisting the Prime Minister for Science (to 4 June 1991); Minister assisting the Treasurer (to 4 June 1991); Minister for Primary Industries and Energy (from 4 June 1991)

== Outer ministry ==
Party	Minister	Portrait	Portfolio
Labor	David Beddall (1948–) MP for Rankin (1984–1998)		Minister for Small Business and Customs
Labor	Michael Tate (1945–2026) Senator for Tasmania (1978–1993)		Minister for Justice and Consumer Affairs
Labor	Peter Baldwin (1951–) MP for Sydney (1983–1998)		Minister for Employment and Education Services (to 7 May 1990); Minister for Higher Education and Employment Services (from 7 May 1990)
Labor	Robert Tickner (1951–) MP for Hughes (1984–1996)		Minister for Aboriginal Affairs (to 19 December 1991); Minister assisting the Prime Minister for Reconciliation (from 21 February 1991); Minister for Aboriginal and Torres Strait Islander Affairs (from 19 December 1991)
Labor	Bob Collins (1946–2007) Senator for Northern Territory (1987–1998)		Minister for Shipping (to 7 May 1990); Minister assisting the Prime Minister for Northern Australia; Minister for Shipping and Aviation Support (from 7 May 1990)
Labor	Bob Brown (1933–2022) MP for Charlton (1984–1998)		Minister for Land Transport
Labor	Alan Griffiths (1952–) MP for Maribyrnong (1983–1996)		Minister for Resources
Labor	Peter Staples (1947–) MP for Jagajaga (1984–1996)		Minister for Housing and Aged Care (to 7 May 1990); Minister for Aged, Family and Health Services (from 7 May 1990)
Labor	Ben Humphreys (1934–2019) MP for Griffith (1977–1996)		Minister for Veterans' Affairs
Labor	Gordon Bilney (1939–2012) MP for Kingston (1983–1996)		Minister for Defence Science and Personnel
Labor	Wendy Fatin (1941–) MP for Brand (1984–1996)		Minister for Local Government; Minister assisting the Prime Minister for the Status of Women
Labor	David Simmons (1947–) MP for Calare (1983–1996)		Minister for the Arts, Tourism and Territories
Labor	Ross Free (1943–) MP for Lindsay (1984–1996) (in Ministry from 4 June 1991)		Parliamentary secretary to the Prime Minister (to 4 June 1991); Minister for Science and Technology (from 4 June 1991); Minister assisting the Prime Minister for Science (from 4 June 1991); Minister assisting the Treasurer (from 4 June 1991)

== Parliamentary secretaries ==
Party	Minister	Portrait	Portfolio
Labor	Bob McMullan (1947–) Senator for Australian Capital Territory (1988–1996)		Parliamentary secretary to the Treasurer; Manager of Government Business in the Senate (from 4 June 1991)
Labor	Warren Snowdon (1950–) MP for Northern Territory (1987–1996)		Parliamentary secretary to the Minister for Transport and Communications
Labor	Con Sciacca (1947–2017) MP for Bowman (1987–1996)		Parliamentary secretary to the Minister for Social Security
Labor	Roger Price (1945–) MP for Chifley (1984–2010)		Parliamentary secretary to the Prime Minister (from 4 June 1991)

== See also ==
- First Hawke ministry
- Second Hawke ministry
- Third Hawke ministry
