= Kay Patterson (Australian politician) =

Australian politician

The Honourable Dr Kay Patterson AO
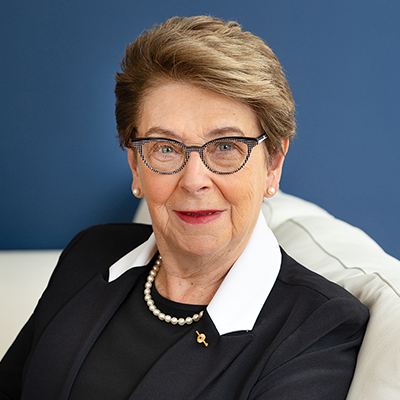
- Patterson in 2017

Minister Assisting the Prime Minister for Women's Issues
- In office 7 October 2003 – 27 January 2006
- Prime Minister: John Howard
- Preceded by: Amanda Vanstone
- Succeeded by: Julie Bishop

Minister for Family and Community Services
- In office 7 October 2003 – 27 January 2006
- Prime Minister: John Howard
- Preceded by: Amanda Vanstone
- Succeeded by: Mal Brough

Minister for Health & Ageing
- In office 26 November 2001 – 7 October 2003
- Prime Minister: John Howard
- Preceded by: Michael Wooldridge
- Succeeded by: Tony Abbott

Senator for Victoria
- In office 11 July 1987 – 30 June 2008

Personal details
- Born: Kay Christine Lesley Patterson; 21 November 1944 (age 81) Sydney, Australia
- Party: Liberal Party of Australia
- Education: University of Sydney; Monash University
- Occupation: Former politician; academic; Age Discrimination Commissioner AHRC

Kay Christine Lesley Patterson AO (born 21 November 1944) is a former Australian politician. She was a Liberal member of the Australian Senate from 1987 to 2008, representing the state of Victoria.

== Background and education ==
Patterson was born in Sydney and was educated at the University of Sydney, where she graduated with honours with a Bachelor of Arts; and at Monash University where she graduated with a Doctor of Philosophy and Diploma of Education. She studied psychology and education, going on to become a university lecturer, working in several universities in both Australia and in the United States. She is a graduate of the Australian Institute of Company Directors (2009).

== Political career ==
In 1985, Patterson was elected as her local party branch delegate to the Liberal Party's State Council. In 1987, when she was pre-selected for a Liberal Senate seat, becoming a senator for the state of Victoria at the 1987 election.

Patterson was promoted to the shadow ministry in 1990 as a parliamentary secretary. Over the next few years, she occupied a number of portfolios in relation to health, aged care and social policy. She was promoted again (Shadow Minister for Senior Citizens and Aged Care and Shadow Minister Assisting the Leader on Women's Affairs and the Arts) under the leadership of John Hewson, but was demoted to a shadow parliamentary secretary position under Alexander Downer.

The Liberal Party was returned to power at the 1996 election under John Howard. In 1996 (Sept-Dec) Patterson was Parliamentary Adviser to the Australian Mission to the UN for 1996 UNGA. In 1998 Patterson was appointed as Parliamentary Secretary to the Minister for Immigration and Multicultural Affairs In 2000 she was given the additional responsibility of Parliamentary Secretary to the Minister for Foreign Affairs. The following year, Patterson led the Australian delegation to the World Conference Against Racism in Durban, South Africa.

Following the retirement of Michael Wooldridge at the 2001 election, Patterson was appointed as the Minister for Health and Ageing. She was well received by the Australian Medical Association, who had had a strained relationship with her predecessor. In 2003, in a major reshuffle, she was re-appointed to Cabinet as Minister for Family and Community Services and Minister assisting the Prime Minister for Women's Issues. In 2005 Patterson led the Australian delegation to the UN Commission on the Status of Women in NY. On 22 January 2006, Patterson announced her resignation from the ministry, and her commission ceased on 27 January. She also announced that she would retire, and left parliament at the expiration of her term in June 2008.

== Community involvement ==
Patterson was a member of Monash University Council (1978–1998), she was appointed a vice chancellor's professorial fellow at the university (2008–2015) . and a Professorial Fellow in the Faculty of Medicine and Health Sciences (2016-2020), in this role she was the vice chairman of the advisory board to the Australian Regenerative Medicine Institute (ARMI) (1999–2019) and an ARMI Ambassador (2019-2026), and is a member of the Monash Centre for Human Anatomy Education Advisory Board. She was appointed an Honorary Fellow of Monash University (2020-2023) She was a member of the Monash Ancora Imparo Leadership Committee 2008–2013. Patterson was inducted into Monash University Golden Key Society as an honorary member in 2009. She was awarded a Doctor of Laws (Honoris Causa) Monash University in 2019 and a Doctor of Science (Honoris Causa) Wollongong University in 2024,

Patterson is a member of Girl Guides movement, which she joined when she was 10. She was a member of the Victorian State Council (1974–1991, 1993–1999) and state executive 1974–1995). She was made a life member of Girl Guides Victoria in 2002.

She became a director and member of the board of Interplast Australia and New Zealand in 2006 (vice president 2009), retiring when her term ended in 2015 and continued until 2018 as a Company Member. She is a director of the Brockhoff Foundation (2008-2023). She was a Commissioner on the National Mental Health Commission (2014–2016) and a member of the Victorian Responsible Gambling Foundation (2014–2016). She was appointed for a five-year term as the national Age Discrimination Commissioner in the Australian Human Rights Commission on 29 July 2016, her appointment was extended in 2021 for a further two years. She was appointed a member of the Australia Post Stakeholder Council (2019-2026). In December 2021 she was appointed as member of the Australian Council of Elders for two years (2021-2023). She was appointed Patron of the Australian Institute for Intergenerational Practice (AIIP) 2023 and Patron of Elder Abuse Action Australia (EAAA) in 2024.

She has also been involved in Capacity Building Workshops for female candidates for election in Laos (UN Workshop – 2006), Australian National University Centre for Democratic Institutions capacity building programs – Solomon Islands (2008), Canberra (2009), Canberra (2013). She chaired a Ministerial Advisory Committee on Homelessness (Vic) (2012–2014)

Political offices
Preceded by Michael Wooldridge	Minister for Health and Ageing; 2001–2003	Succeeded by Tony Abbott
Preceded by Amanda Vanstone	Minister for Family and Community Services; 2003–2006	Succeeded by Mal Brough
Preceded by Amanda Vanstone	Minister assisting the Prime; Minister for the Status of Women/ Minister Assisting the Prime; Minister for Women's Issues; 2003–2006	Succeeded by Julie Bishop
