= First Keating ministry =

58th ministry of government of Australia

- 58th Ministry of Australia

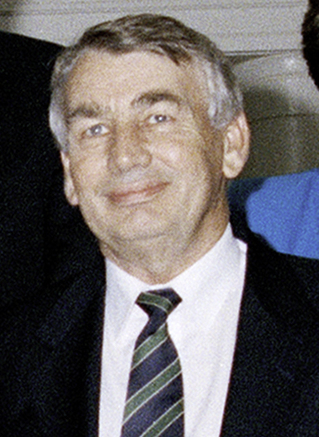
- Paul Keating Brian Howe
- Date formed: 20 December 1991
- Date dissolved: 24 March 1993

People and organisations
- Monarch: Elizabeth II
- Governor-General: Bill Hayden
- Prime Minister: Paul Keating
- Deputy Prime Minister: Brian Howe
- No. of ministers: 31 (plus 8 Parliamentary Secretaries)
- Member party: Labor
- Status in legislature: Majority government
- Opposition party: Liberal–National coalition
- Opposition leader: John Hewson

History
- Outgoing election: 13 March 1993
- Legislature term: 36th
- Predecessor: Fourth Hawke ministry
- Successor: Second Keating ministry

The first Keating ministry (Labor) was the 58th ministry of the Government of Australia. It was led by the country's 24th Prime Minister, Paul Keating. The first Keating ministry succeeded the fourth Hawke ministry, which dissolved on 20 December 1991 following the successful leadership challenge by Keating and subsequent resignation of Bob Hawke as Prime Minister. The ministry was replaced by the second Keating ministry on 24 March 1993 following the 1993 federal election.

== Cabinet ==
Party	Minister	Portrait	Portfolio
Labor	Paul Keating (1944-) MP for Blaxland (1969–1996)		Prime Minister; Leader of the Labor Party
Labor	Brian Howe (1936–) MP for Batman (1977–1996)		Deputy Prime Minister; Deputy Leader of the Labor Party; Minister for Health, Housing and Community Services; Minister assisting the Prime Minister for Commonwealth-State Relations; Minister assisting the Prime Minister for Social Justice
Labor	John Button (1933–2008) Senator for Victoria (1974–1993)		Leader of the Government in the Senate; Minister for Industry, Technology and Commerce
Labor	Gareth Evans (1944–) Senator for Victoria (1978–1996)		Minister for Foreign Affairs and Trade
Labor	Neal Blewett (1933–) MP for Bonython (1977–1994)		Minister for Trade and Overseas Development (to 27 December 1991); Minister assisting the Minister for Industry, Technology and Commerce (to 27 December 1991); Minister assisting the Minister for Primary Industries and Energy (to 27 December 1991); Minister for Social Security (from 27 December 1991)
Labor	Ralph Willis (1938–) MP for Gellibrand (1972–1998)		Treasurer (to 27 December 1991); Minister for Finance (from 27 December 1991); Vice-President of the Executive Council (from 27 May 1992)
Labor	Michael Duffy (1938–) MP for Holt (1980–1996)		Attorney-General
Labor	John Dawkins (1947–) MP for Fremantle (1977–1994)		Minister for Employment, Education and Training (to 27 December 1991); Treasurer (from 27 December 1991)
Labor	Kim Beazley (1948–) MP for Swan (1980–1996)		Minister for Finance (to 27 December 1991); Minister for Employment, Education and Training (from 27 December 1991); Leader of the House
Labor	John Kerin (1937–2023) MP for Werriwa (1978–1993) (in Cabinet until 27 December 1991)		Minister for Transport and Communications (to 27 December 1991); Minister for Trade and Overseas Development (from 27 December 1991)
Labor	Graham Richardson (1949–2025) Senator for New South Wales (1983–1994)		Minister for Social Security (to 27 December 1991); Minister for Transport and Communications (from 27 December 1991 to 27 May 1992); Vice-President of the Executive Council (to 27 May 1992)
Labor	Robert Ray (1947–) Senator for Victoria (1981–2008)		Minister for Defence
Labor	Gerry Hand (1942–2023) MP for Melbourne (1983–1993)		Minister for Immigration, Local Government and Ethnic Affairs; Minister assisting the Prime Minister for Multicultural Affairs
Labor	Ros Kelly (1948–) MP for Canberra (1980–1995)		Minister for the Arts, Sport, the Environment, Tourism and Territories (to 27 December 1991); Minister for the Arts, Sport, the Environment and Territories (from 27 December 1991)
Labor	Peter Cook (1943–2005) Senator for Western Australia (1983–2005)		Minister for Industrial Relations; Minister assisting the Prime Minister for Public Service Matters; Minister for Shipping and Aviation Support (from 27 May 1992)
Labor	Nick Bolkus (1950–2025) Senator for South Australia (1981–2005)		Minister for Administrative Services
Labor	Simon Crean (1949–2023) MP for Hotham (1990–2013)		Minister for Primary Industries and Energy
Labor	Alan Griffiths (1952–) MP for Maribyrnong (1983–1996) (in Cabinet from 27 December 1991)		Minister for Resources; Minister for Tourism (from 27 December 1991)
Labor	Bob Collins (1946–2007) Senator for Northern Territory (1987–1998) (in Cabinet from 27 December 1991)		Minister for Shipping and Aviation Support (to 27 December 1991); Minister for Shipping and Aviation (from 27 December 1991 to 27 May 1992); Minister assisting the Prime Minister for Northern Australia (to 27 May 1992); Minister for Transport and Communications (from 27 May 1992)
Labor	Ben Humphreys (1934–2019) MP for Griffith (1977–1996) (in Cabinet from 27 May 1992)		Minister for Veterans' Affairs; Minister assisting the Prime Minister for Northern Australia (from 27 May 1992)

== Outer ministry ==
Party	Minister	Portrait	Portfolio
Labor	Michael Tate (1945–2026) Senator for Tasmania (1978–1993)		Minister for Justice and Consumer Affairs (to 27 May 1992); Minister for Justice (from 27 May 1992); Minister assisting the Minister for Immigration (from 27 May 1992)
Labor	Peter Staples (1947–) MP for Jagajaga (1984–1996)		Minister for Aged, Family and Health Services
Labor	Bob Brown (1933–2022) MP for Charlton (1984–1998)		Minister for Land Transport
Labor	David Simmons (1947–) MP for Calare (1983–1996)		Minister for the Arts, Tourism and Territories (to 27 December 1991); Minister for Family Support (from 27 December 1991); Minister for Local Government, Territories and Roads (from 27 December 1991)
Labor	Peter Baldwin (1951–) MP for Sydney (1983–1998)		Minister for Higher Education and Employment Services; Minister assisting the Treasurer (from 27 December 1991)
Labor	David Beddall (1948–) MP for Rankin (1984–1998)		Minister for Small Business and Customs (to 27 December 1991); Minister for Small Business, Construction and Customs (from 27 December 1991)
Labor	Gordon Bilney (1939–2012) MP for Kingston (1983–1996)		Minister for Defence Science and Personnel
Labor	Wendy Fatin (1941–) MP for Brand (1984–1996)		Minister for Local Government (to 27 December 1991); Minister assisting the Prime Minister for the Status of Women; Minister for the Arts and Territories (from 27 December 1991)
Labor	Robert Tickner (1951–) MP for Hughes (1984–1996)		Minister for Aboriginal and Torres Strait Islander Affairs; Minister assisting the Prime Minister for Reconciliation
Labor	Ross Free (1943–) MP for Lindsay (1984–1996)		Minister for Science and Technology; Minister assisting the Prime Minister for Science (to 27 December 1991); Minister assisting the Treasurer (to 27 December 1991); Minister assisting the Prime Minister (from 27 December 1991)
Labor	Jeannette McHugh (1934–) MP for Phillip (1983–1993) MP for Grayndler (1993–1996) (in Ministry from 27 May 1992)		Minister for Consumer Affairs (from 27 May 1992)

== Parliamentary Secretaries ==
Party	Minister	Portrait	Portfolio
Labor	Bob McMullan (1947–) Senator for Australian Capital Territory (1988–1996)		Parliamentary Secretary to the Treasurer; Manager of Government Business in the Senate
Labor	Con Sciacca (1947–2017) MP for Bowman (1987–1996)		Parliamentary Secretary to the Minister for Social Security
Labor	Warren Snowdon (1950–) MP for Northern Territory (1987–1996)		Parliamentary Secretary to the Minister for Transport and Communications (to 27 May 1992); Parliamentary Secretary to the Minister for Employment, Education and Training (from 27 May 1992)
Labor	Roger Price (1945–) MP for Chifley (1984–2010)		Parliamentary Secretary to the Prime Minister (to 27 December 1991); Parliamentary Secretary to the Minister for Defence (from 27 December 1991)
Labor	Laurie Brereton (1946–) MP for Kingsford-Smith (1990–2004)		Parliamentary Secretary to the Prime Minister (from 27 December 1991)
Labor	Peter Duncan (1945–) MP for Makin (1984–1996)		Parliamentary Secretary to the Attorney-General (from 27 December 1991)
Labor	Gary Johns (1952–) MP for Petrie (1984–1996)		Parliamentary Secretary to the Minister for Health, Housing and Community Services (from 27 December 1991)
Labor	Stephen Martin (1948–) MP for Macarthur (1984–1993) MP for Cunningham (1993–2002)		Parliamentary Secretary to the Minister for Foreign Affairs and Trade (from 27 December 1991)
