= Second Hawke ministry =

55th ministry of government of Australia

- 55th Ministry of Australia

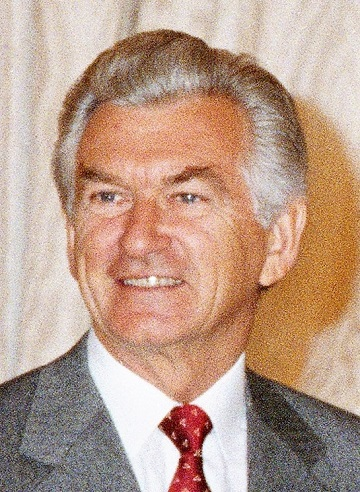
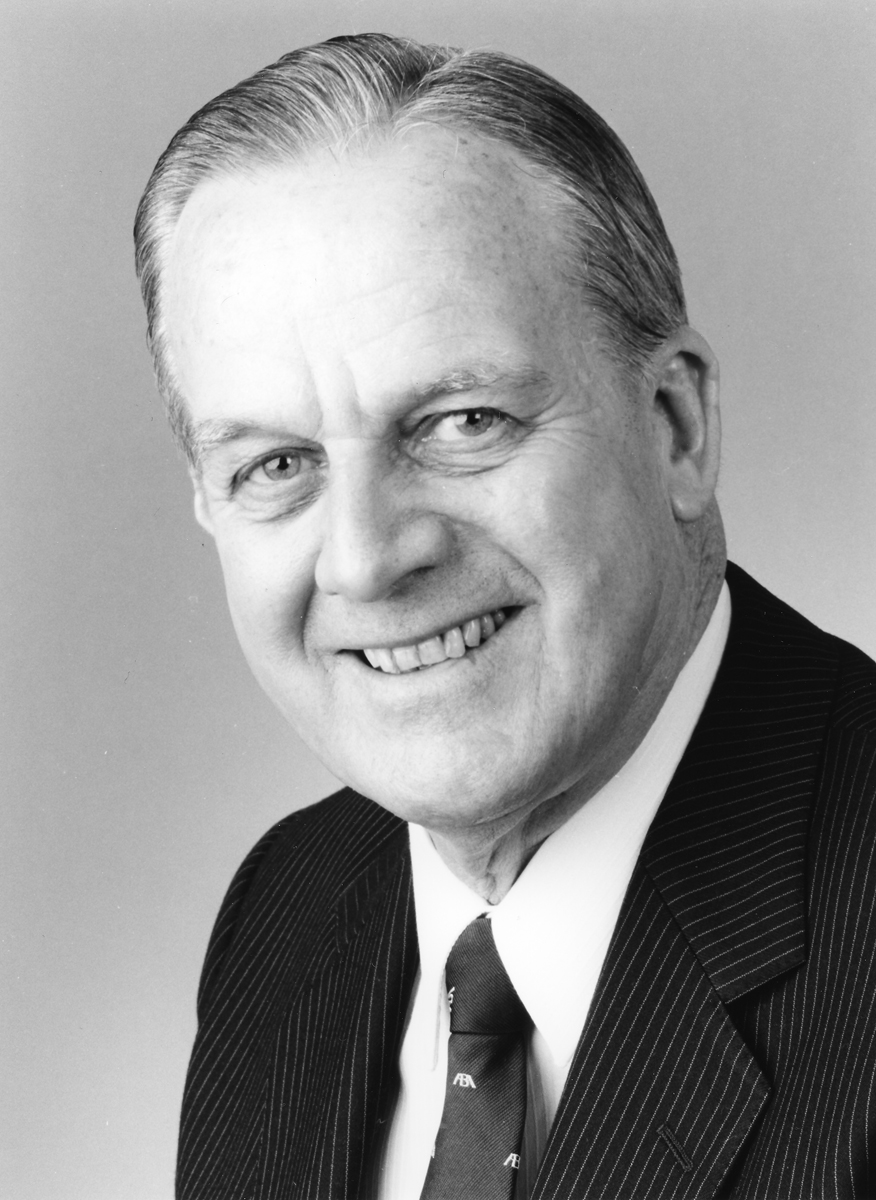
- Bob Hawke Lionel Bowen
- Date formed: 13 December 1984
- Date dissolved: 24 July 1987

People and organisations
- Monarch: Elizabeth II
- Governor-General: Sir Ninian Stephen
- Prime Minister: Bob Hawke
- Deputy Prime Minister: Lionel Bowen
- No. of ministers: 28
- Member party: Labor
- Status in legislature: Majority government
- Opposition party: Liberal–National coalition
- Opposition leader: Andrew Peacock; John Howard

History
- Election: 1 December 1984
- Outgoing election: 11 July 1987
- Legislature term: 34th
- Predecessor: First Hawke ministry
- Successor: Third Hawke ministry

The second Hawke ministry (Labor) was the 55th ministry of the Government of Australia. It was led by the country's 23rd Prime Minister, Bob Hawke. The second Hawke ministry succeeded the first Hawke ministry, which dissolved on 13 December 1984 following the federal election that took place on 1 December. The ministry was replaced by the third Hawke ministry on 24 July 1987 following the 1987 federal election.

== Cabinet ==
Party	Minister	Portrait	Portfolio
Labor	Bob Hawke (1929–2019) MP for Wills (1980–1992)		Prime Minister; Leader of the Labor Party
Labor	Lionel Bowen (1922–2012) MP for Kingsford-Smith (1969–1990)		Deputy Prime Minister; Deputy Leader of the Labor Party; Attorney-General; Minister assisting the Prime Minister for Commonwealth-State Relations; Vice-President of the Executive Council
Labor	John Button (1933–2008) Senator for Victoria (1974–1993)		Leader of the Government in the Senate; Minister for Industry, Technology and Commerce
Labor	Don Grimes (1937–2021) Senator for Tasmania (1974–1987)		Minister for Community Services (to 16 February 1987); Manager of Government Business in the Senate (to 17 February 1987)
Labor	Ralph Willis (1938–) MP for Gellibrand (1972–1998)		Minister for Employment and Industrial Relations; Minister assisting the Prime Minister for Public Service Industrial Matters
Labor	Paul Keating (1944-) MP for Blaxland (1969–1996)		Treasurer
Labor	Mick Young (1936-1996) MP for Port Adelaide (1974–1988)		Special Minister of State (to 16 February 1987); Minister for Immigration and Ethnic Affairs (from 16 February 1987); Leader of the House
Labor	Peter Walsh (1935–2015) Senator for Western Australia (1974–1993)		Minister for Finance; Minister assisting the Prime Minister for Public Service Matters
Labor	Bill Hayden (1933–2023) MP for Oxley (1961–1988)		Minister for Foreign Affairs
Labor	Susan Ryan (1942–2020) Senator for Australian Capital Territory (1975–1987)		Minister for Education; Minister assisting the Prime Minister for the Status of Women
Labor	Gareth Evans (1944–) Senator for Victoria (1978–1996)		Minister for Resources and Energy; Minister assisting the Prime Minister; Minister assisting the Minister for Foreign Affairs; Manager of Government Business in the Senate (from 17 February 1987)
Labor	John Dawkins (1947–) MP for Fremantle (1977–1994)		Minister for Trade; Minister assisting the Prime Minister for Youth Affairs
Labor	John Kerin (1937–2023) MP for Werriwa (1978–1993)		Minister for Primary Industry
Labor	Stewart West (1934–2023) MP for Cunningham (1977–1993)		Minister for Housing and Construction
Labor	Kim Beazley (1948–) MP for Swan (1980–1996)		Minister for Defence
Labor	Chris Hurford (1931–2020) MP for Adelaide (1969–1987)		Minister for Immigration and Ethnic Affairs (to 16 February 1987); Minister assisting the Treasurer; Minister for Community Services (from 16 February 1987)
Labor	Brian Howe (1936–) MP for Batman (1977–1996)		Minister for Social Security

== Outer ministry ==
Party	Minister	Portrait	Portfolio
Labor	Peter Morris (1932–2026) MP for Shortland (1972–1998)		Minister for Transport; Minister for Aviation
Labor	John Brown (1931–) MP for Parramatta (1977–1990)		Minister for Sport, Recreation and Tourism; Minister assisting the Minister for Defence
Labor	Neal Blewett (1933–) MP for Bonython (1977–1994)		Minister for Health
Labor	Barry Jones (1932–) MP for Lalor (1977–1998)		Minister for Science; Minister assisting the Minister for Industry, Technology and Commerce
Labor	Gordon Scholes (1931–2018) MP for Corio (1967–1993)		Minister for Territories
Labor	Michael Duffy (1938–) MP for Holt (1980–1996)		Minister for Communications; Minister assisting the Minister for Defence
Labor	Barry Cohen (1935–2017) MP for Robertson (1969–1990)		Minister for Arts, Heritage and the Environment; Minister assisting the Prime Minister for the Bicentennial
Labor	Clyde Holding (1931–2011) MP for Melbourne Ports (1977–1998)		Minister for Aboriginal Affairs
Labor	Arthur Gietzelt (1920–2014) Senator for New South Wales (1971–1989)		Minister for Veterans' Affairs
Labor	Tom Uren (1921–2015) MP for Reid (1958–1990)		Minister for Local Government and Administrative Services
Labor	Michael Tate (1945–) Senator for Tasmania (1978–1993) (in Ministry from 16 February 1987)		Special Minister of State (from 16 February 1987)

== See also ==
- First Hawke ministry
- Third Hawke ministry
- Fourth Hawke ministry
- Peacock shadow ministry (1983–85)
