= Third Hawke ministry =

56th ministry of government of Australia

- 56th Ministry of Australia

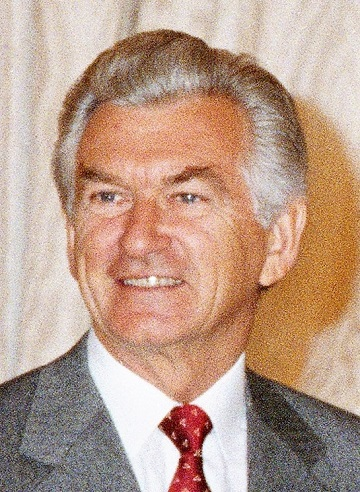
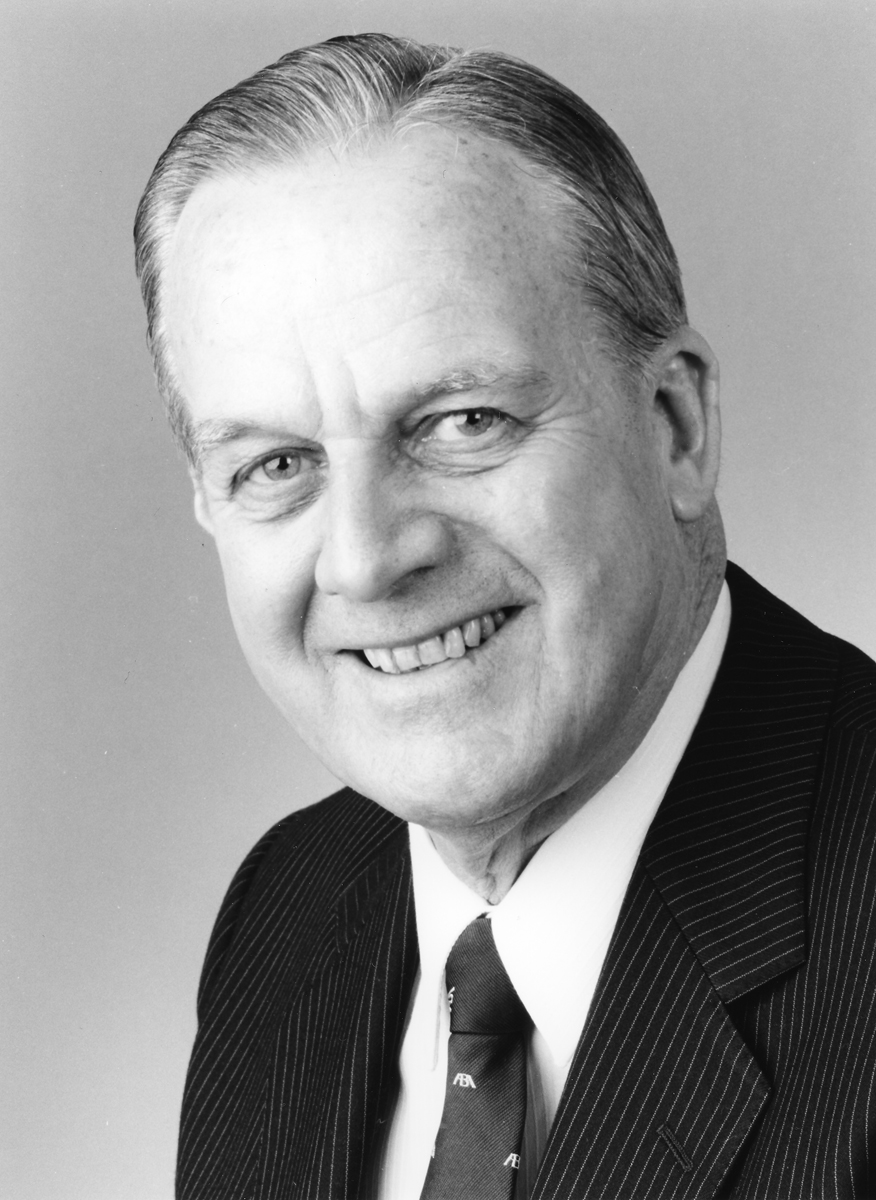
- Bob Hawke Lionel Bowen
- Date formed: 24 July 1987
- Date dissolved: 4 April 1990

People and organisations
- Monarch: Elizabeth II
- Governor-General: Sir Ninian Stephen; Bill Hayden
- Prime Minister: Bob Hawke
- Deputy Prime Minister: Lionel Bowen
- No. of ministers: 35
- Member party: Labor
- Status in legislature: Majority government
- Opposition party: Liberal–National coalition
- Opposition leader: John Howard; Andrew Peacock

History
- Election: 11 July 1987
- Outgoing election: 24 March 1990
- Legislature term: 35th
- Predecessor: Second Hawke ministry
- Successor: Fourth Hawke ministry

The third Hawke ministry (Labor) was the 56th ministry of the Government of Australia. It was led by the country's 23rd Prime Minister, Bob Hawke. The third Hawke ministry succeeded the second Hawke ministry, which dissolved on 24 July 1987 following the federal election that took place on 11 July. The ministry was replaced by the fourth Hawke ministry on 4 April 1990 following the 1990 federal election.

== Cabinet ==
Party	Minister	Portrait	Portfolio
Labor	Bob Hawke (1929–2019) MP for Wills (1980–1992)		Prime Minister; Leader of the Labor Party
Labor	Lionel Bowen (1922–2012) MP for Kingsford-Smith (1969–1990)		Deputy Prime Minister; Deputy Leader of the Labor Party; Attorney-General; Minister assisting the Prime Minister for Commonwealth-State Relations
Labor	John Button (1933–2008) Senator for Victoria (1974–1993)		Leader of the Government in the Senate; Minister for Industry, Technology and Commerce
Labor	Gareth Evans (1944–) Senator for Victoria (1978–1996)		Minister for Transport and Communications (to 2 September 1988); Minister for Foreign Affairs and Trade (from 2 September 1988); Manager of Government Business in the Senate (to 2 September 1988)
Labor	Paul Keating (1944-) MP for Blaxland (1969–1996)		Treasurer
Labor	Mick Young (1936-1996) MP for Port Adelaide (1974–1988)		Minister for Immigration, Local Government and Ethnic Affairs (to 12 February 1988); Vice-President of the Executive Council (to 12 February 1988); Minister assisting the Prime Minister for Multicultural Affairs (to 12 February 1988); Leader of the House (to 12 February 1988)
Labor	Peter Walsh (1935–2015) Senator for Western Australia (1974–1993)		Minister for Finance
Labor	Bill Hayden (1933–2023) MP for Oxley (1961–1988)		Minister for Foreign Affairs and Trade (to 17 August 1988)
Labor	Ralph Willis (1938–) MP for Gellibrand (1972–1998)		Minister for Industrial Relations (to 2 September 1988); Minister assisting the Prime Minister for Public Service Matters (to 2 September 1988); Minister for Transport and Communications (from 2 September 1988)
Labor	John Dawkins (1947–) MP for Fremantle (1977–1994)		Minister for Employment, Education and Training
Labor	Kim Beazley (1948–) MP for Swan (1980–1996)		Minister for Defence; Vice-President of the Executive Council (from 12 February 1988); Leader of the House (from 12 February 1988)
Labor	John Kerin (1937–2023) MP for Werriwa (1978–1993)		Minister for Primary Industries and Energy
Labor	Brian Howe (1936–) MP for Batman (1977–1996)		Minister for Social Security; Minister assisting the Prime Minister for Social Justice (from 2 September 1988)
Labor	Stewart West (1934-2023) MP for Cunningham (1977–1993)		Minister for Administrative Services
Labor	John Brown (1931–) MP for Parramatta (1977–1990)		Minister for the Arts, Sport, the Environment, Tourism and Territories (to 19 January 1988)
Labor	Neal Blewett (1933–) MP for Bonython (1977–1994)		Minister for Community Services and Health
Labor	Susan Ryan (1942–2020) Senator for Australian Capital Territory (1975–1987)		Special Minister of State (to 19 January 1988); Minister assisting the Prime Minister for the Status of Women (to 19 January 1988); Minister assisting the Prime Minister for the Bicentennial (to 19 January 1988); Minister assisting the Minister for Community Services and Health (to 19 January 1988)
Labor	Michael Duffy (1938–) MP for Holt (1980–1996) (in Cabinet from 19 January 1988)		Minister for Trade Negotiations; Minister assisting the Minister for Industry, Technology and Commerce; Minister assisting the Minister for Primary Industries and Energy
Labor	Graham Richardson (1949–2025) Senator for New South Wales (1983–1994) (in Cabinet from 19 January 1988)		Minister for the Environment and the Arts (to 19 January 1988); Minister for the Arts, Sport, the Environment, Tourism and Territories (from 19 January 1988)
Labor	Clyde Holding (1931–2011) MP for Melbourne Ports (1977–1998) (in Cabinet from 15 February 1988 until 2 September 1988)		Minister for Employment Services and Youth Affairs (to 19 January 1988); Minister assisting the Treasurer (to 15 February 1988); Minister for Transport and Communications Support (from 19 January 1988 to 15 February 1988); Minister for Immigration, Local Government and Ethnic Affairs (from 15 February 1988 to 2 September 1988); Minister assisting the Prime Minister for Multicultural Affairs (from 15 February 1988 to 2 September 1988); Minister for the Arts and Territories (from 2 September 1988 to 22 May 1989); Minister assisting the Prime Minister (from 2 September 1988); Minister assisting the Minister for Immigration, Local Government and Ethnic Affairs (from 2 September 1988); Minister for the Arts, Tourism and Territories (from 22 May 1989)
Labor	Peter Morris (1932–2026) MP for Shortland (1972–1998) (in Cabinet from 2 September 1988)		Minister for Resources (to 19 January 1988); Minister for Housing and Aged Care (from 19 January 1988 to 15 February 1988); Minister assisting the Prime Minister (from 19 January 1988 to 2 September 1988); Minister assisting the Treasurer (from 15 February 1988); Minister for Transport and Communications Support (from 15 February 1988 to 2 September 1988); Minister for Industrial Relations (from 2 September 1988); Minister assisting the Prime Minister for Public Service Matters (from 2 September 1988)
Labor	Robert Ray (1947–) Senator for Victoria (1981–2008) (in Cabinet from 2 September 1988)		Minister for Home Affairs (to 2 September 1988); Minister assisting the Minister for Transport and Communications (from 19 January 1988 to 2 September 1988); Minister for Immigration, Local Government and Ethnic Affairs (from 2 September 1988); Minister assisting the Prime Minister for Multicultural Affairs (from 2 September 1988); Manager of Government Business in the Senate (from 2 September 1988)

== Outer ministry ==
Party	Minister	Portrait	Portfolio
Labor	Peter Staples (1947–) MP for Jagajaga (1984–1996)		Minister for Consumer Affairs (to 15 February 1988); Minister assisting the Treasurer for Prices (to 15 February 1988); Minister for Housing and Aged Care (from 15 February 1988)
Labor	Barry Jones (1932–) MP for Lalor (1977–1998)		Minister for Science and Small Business (to 19 January 1988); Minister for Science, Customs and Small Business (from 19 January 1988); Minister assisting the Prime Minister for Science and Technology (from 8 May 1989)
Labor	Peter Duncan (1945–) MP for Makin (1984–1996)		Minister for Land Transport and Infrastructure Support (to 19 January 1988); Minister for Employment and Education Services (from 19 January 1988)
Labor	Gerry Hand (1942–2023) MP for Melbourne (1983–1993)		Minister for Aboriginal Affairs
Labor	Ben Humphreys (1934–2019) MP for Griffith (1977–1996)		Minister for Veterans' Affairs; Chief Government Whip in the House (to 14 September 1987)
Labor	Michael Tate (1945–2026) Senator for Tasmania (1978–1993)		Parliamentary Secretary for Justice (to 18 September 1987); Minister for Justice (from 18 September 1987)
Labor	Ros Kelly (1948–) MP for Canberra (1980–1995)		Parliamentary Secretary for Defence Science and Personnel (to 18 September 1987); Minister for Defence Science and Personnel (from 18 September 1987 to 6 April 1989); Minister for Telecommunications and Aviation Support (from 6 April 1989)
Labor	Margaret Reynolds (1941–) Senator for Queensland (1983–1999)		Parliamentary Secretary for Local Government (to 18 September 1987); Minister for Local Government (from 18 September 1987); Minister assisting the Prime Minister for the Status of Women (from 19 January 1988)
Labor	Peter Cook (1943–2005) Senator for Western Australia (1983–2005) (in Ministry from 19 January 1988)		Minister for Resources (from 19 January 1988)
Labor	Gary Punch (1957–) MP for Barton (1983–1996) (in Ministry from 19 January 1988)		Minister for the Arts and Territories (from 19 January 1988 to 2 September 1988); Minister for Telecommunications and Aviation Support (from 2 September 1988 to 28 March 1989)
Labor	Nick Bolkus (1950–2025) Senator for South Australia (1981–2005) (in Ministry from 15 February 1988)		Minister for Consumer Affairs (from 15 February 1988); Minister assisting the Treasurer for Prices (from 15 February 1988)
Labor	Bob Brown (1933–2022) MP for Charlton (1984–1998) (in Ministry from 2 September 1988)		Minister for Land Transport and Shipping Support (from 2 September 1988)
Labor	David Simmons (1947–) MP for Calare (1983–1996) (in Ministry from 6 April 1989)		Minister for Defence Science and Personnel (from 6 April 1989)

== See also ==
- First Hawke ministry
- Second Hawke ministry
- Fourth Hawke ministry
- Peacock shadow ministry (1989–90)
