= First Hawke ministry =

54th ministry of the government of Australia

- 54th Ministry of Australia

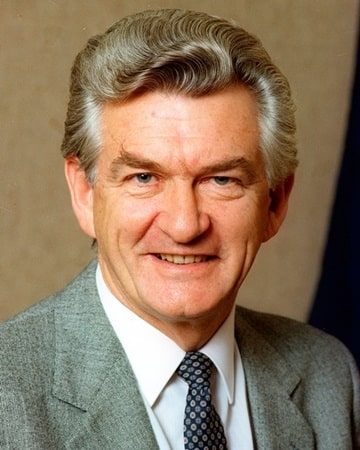
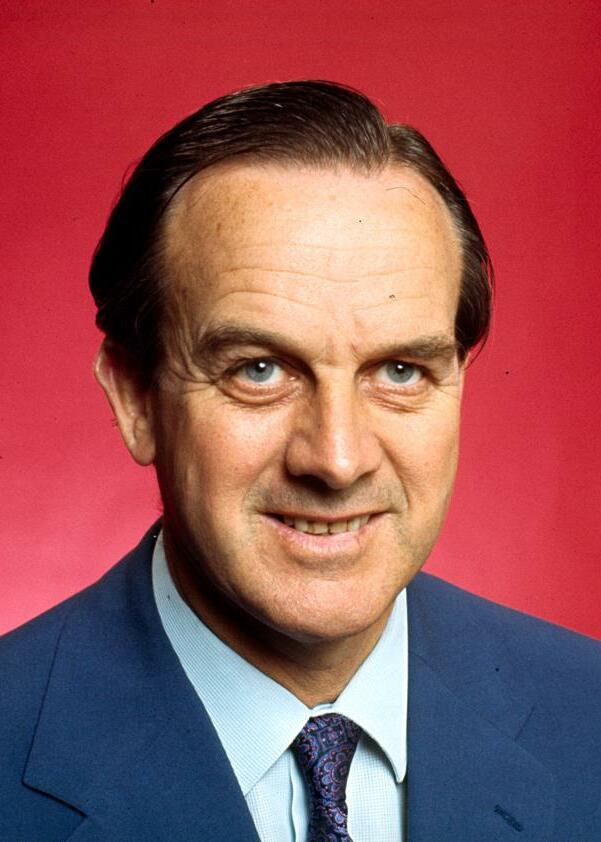
- Bob Hawke Lionel Bowen
- Date formed: 11 March 1983
- Date dissolved: 13 December 1984

People and organisations
- Monarch: Elizabeth II
- Governor-General: Sir Ninian Stephen
- Prime Minister: Bob Hawke
- Deputy Prime Minister: Lionel Bowen
- No. of ministers: 27
- Member party: Labor
- Status in legislature: Majority government
- Opposition party: Liberal–National coalition
- Opposition leader: Andrew Peacock

History
- Election: 5 March 1983
- Outgoing election: 1 December 1984
- Legislature term: 33rd
- Predecessor: Fourth Fraser ministry
- Successor: Second Hawke ministry

The first Hawke ministry (Labor) was the 54th ministry of the Government of Australia. It was led by the country's 23rd Prime Minister, Bob Hawke. The first Hawke ministry succeeded the Fourth Fraser ministry, which dissolved on 11 March 1983 following the federal election that took place on 5 March which saw Labor defeat Malcolm Fraser's Liberal–National Coalition. The ministry was replaced by the second Hawke ministry on 13 December 1984 following the 1984 federal election.

As of 21 October 2023, Ralph Willis, Paul Keating, Gareth Evans and John Dawkins are the last surviving members of Cabinet of the first Hawke ministry.

== Cabinet ==
| Party | Minister | Portrait | Portfolio |
|---|---|---|---|
| Labor | Bob Hawke (1929–2019) MP for Wills (1980–1992) | | Prime Minister; Leader of the Labor Party |
| Labor | Lionel Bowen (1922–2012) MP for Kingsford-Smith (1969–1990) | | Deputy Prime Minister; Deputy Leader of the Labor Party; Minister for Trade; Minister assisting the Prime Minister for Commonwealth-State Relations; Vice-President of the Executive Council (from 14 July 1983); Leader of the House (from 14 July 1983 to 21 January 1984) |
| Labor | John Button (1933–2008) Senator for Victoria (1974–1993) | | Leader of the Government in the Senate; Minister for Industry and Commerce; Minister assisting the Minister for Communications |
| Labor | Don Grimes (1937–2021) Senator for Tasmania (1974–1987) | | Minister for Social Security; Manager of Government Business in the Senate (from 21 April 1983) |
| Labor | Ralph Willis (1938–) MP for Gellibrand (1972–1998) | | Minister for Employment and Industrial Relations; Minister assisting the Prime Minister for Public Service Matters (to 28 June 1983); Minister assisting the Prime Minister for Public Service Industrial Matters (from 28 June 1983) |
| Labor | Paul Keating (1944–) MP for Blaxland (1969–1996) | | Treasurer |
| Labor | Mick Young (1936–1996) MP for Port Adelaide (1974–1988) | | Special Minister of State (to 14 July 1983; from 21 January 1984); Vice-President of the Executive Council (to 14 July 1983); Leader of the House (to 14 July 1983; from 21 January 1984) |
| Labor | Stewart West (1934–2023) MP for Cunningham (1977–1993) | | Minister for Immigration and Ethnic Affairs |
| Labor | Peter Walsh (1935–2015) Senator for Western Australia (1974–1993) | | Minister for Resources and Energy |
| Labor | Bill Hayden (1933–2023) MP for Oxley (1961–1988) | | Minister for Foreign Affairs |
| Labor | Susan Ryan (1942–2020) Senator for Australian Capital Territory (1975–1987) | | Minister for Education and Youth Affairs; Minister assisting the Prime Minister for the Status of Women |
| Labor | Gareth Evans (1944–) Senator for Victoria (1978–1996) | | Attorney-General |
| Labor | Gordon Scholes (1931–2018) MP for Corio (1967–1993) | | Minister for Defence |
| Labor | John Dawkins (1947–) MP for Fremantle (1977–1994) (in Cabinet from 14 July 1983) | | Minister for Finance; Minister assisting the Prime Minister for Public Service Matters (from 28 June 1983) |
| Labor | John Kerin (1937–2023) MP for Werriwa (1978–1993) (in Cabinet from 4 November 1983) | | Minister for Primary Industry |

== Outer ministry ==
| Party | Minister | Portrait | Portfolio |
|---|---|---|---|
| Labor | Peter Morris (1932–2026) MP for Shortland (1972–1998) | | Minister for Transport |
| Labor | Kim Beazley (1948–) MP for Swan (1980–1996) | | Minister for Aviation; Minister assisting the Minister for Defence; Special Minister of State (from 14 July 1983 to 21 January 1984) |
| Labor | Chris Hurford (1931–2020) MP for Adelaide (1969–1987) | | Minister for Housing and Construction; Minister assisting the Treasurer |
| Labor | John Brown (1931–) MP for Parramatta (1977–1990) | | Minister for Administrative Services; Minister for Sport, Recreation and Tourism; Minister assisting the Minister for Industry and Commerce |
| Labor | Neal Blewett (1933–) MP for Bonython (1977–1994) | | Minister for Health |
| Labor | Barry Jones (1932–) MP for Lalor (1977–1998) | | Minister for Science and Technology |
| Labor | Michael Duffy (1938–) MP for Holt (1980–1996) | | Minister for Communications |
| Labor | Barry Cohen (1935–2017) MP for Robertson (1969–1990) | | Minister for Home Affairs and Environment |
| Labor | Clyde Holding (1931–2011) MP for Melbourne Ports (1977–1998) | | Minister for Aboriginal Affairs |
| Labor | Arthur Gietzelt (1920–2014) Senator for New South Wales (1971–1989) | | Minister for Veterans' Affairs |
| Labor | Tom Uren (1921–2015) MP for Reid (1958–1990) | | Minister for Territories and Local Government; Minister assisting the Prime Minister for Community Development and Regional Affairs |
| Labor | Brian Howe (1936–) MP for Batman (1977–1996) | | Minister for Defence Support |

== See also ==
- Second Hawke ministry
- Third Hawke ministry
- Fourth Hawke ministry
