= Manager of Government Business in the Senate =

Government post in the Parliament of Australia

In the Parliament of Australia, the Manager of Government Business in the Senate is a government member, usually a minister, whose responsibilities include negotiating with the Manager of Opposition Business in the Senate regarding proceedings in the Australian Senate. Among other things, negotiations would involve the order in which Government bills and other items of business, the time allotted for debate, and the timing of Opposition business. The position is distinct to that of Leader of the Government in the Senate and party whip, each of which also have deputy positions.

== List ==
Manager	Term began	Term ended	Portfolio	Party	Prime Minister
Doug McClelland	9 July 1974	11 November 1975	Minister for the Media (to 1975); Special Minister of State (1975)	Labor	Gough Whitlam
None	11 November 1975	21 April 1983			Malcolm Fraser
Don Grimes	21 April 1983	17 February 1987	Minister for Social Security (to 1984); Minister for Community Services (from 1984)	Labor	Bob Hawke
Gareth Evans	17 February 1987	2 September 1988	Minister Assisting the Prime Minister (Feb–Jul 1987); Minister Assisting the Minister for Foreign Affairs (Feb–Jul 1987); Minister for Transport and Communications (from Jul 1987)	Labor	Bob Hawke
Robert Ray	2 September 1988	4 June 1991	Minister for Immigration, Local Government and Ethnic Affairs (to 1990); Minister for Defence (from 1990)	Labor	Bob Hawke
Bob McMullan	4 June 1991	24 March 1993	Parliamentary Secretary	Labor	Bob Hawke
Bob McMullan	4 June 1991	24 March 1993	Parliamentary Secretary	Labor	Paul Keating
John Faulkner	24 March 1993	11 March 1996	Minister for Veterans' Affairs (to 1994); Minister for Defence Science and Personnel (to 1994); Minister for Sport and Territories (1994); Minister for Environment, Sport and Territories (from 1994)	Labor	Paul Keating
Rod Kemp	17 March 1996	6 November 1996	Parliamentary Secretary (to Oct 1996); Minister Assisting the Treasurer (from Oct 1996)	Liberal	John Howard
Ian Campbell	6 November 1996	17 November 2004	Parliamentary Secretary (to 2003); Minister for Local Government, Territories and Roads (from 2003)	Liberal	John Howard
Chris Ellison	17 November 2004	9 March 2007	Minister for Justice and Customs	Liberal	John Howard
Eric Abetz	9 March 2007	3 December 2007	Minister for Fisheries, Forestry and Conservation	Liberal	John Howard
Joe Ludwig	12 December 2007	14 December 2011	Minister for Human Services (to 2009); Special Minister of State (2009–10); Minister for Agriculture, Fisheries and Forestry (from 2010)	Labor	Kevin Rudd
Joe Ludwig	12 December 2007	14 December 2011	Minister for Human Services (to 2009); Special Minister of State (2009–10); Minister for Agriculture, Fisheries and Forestry (from 2010)	Labor	Julia Gillard
Mark Arbib	14 December 2011	5 March 2012	Minister for Sport; Assistant Treasurer; Minister for Small Business	Labor	Julia Gillard
Jacinta Collins	5 March 2012	7 September 2013	Parliamentary Secretary (to Jul 2013); Minister for Mental Health and Ageing (from Jul 2013)	Labor	Julia Gillard
Jacinta Collins	5 March 2012	7 September 2013	Parliamentary Secretary (to Jul 2013); Minister for Mental Health and Ageing (from Jul 2013)	Labor	Kevin Rudd
Mitch Fifield	18 September 2013	20 December 2017	Assistant Minister for Social Services (To Sep 2015); Minister for Communications; Minister for the Arts	Liberal	Tony Abbott
Mitch Fifield	18 September 2013	20 December 2017	Assistant Minister for Social Services (To Sep 2015); Minister for Communications; Minister for the Arts	Liberal	Malcolm Turnbull
Simon Birmingham	20 December 2017	23 August 2018	Minister for Education and Training	Liberal	Malcolm Turnbull
Mitch Fifield	26 August 2018	29 May 2019	Minister for Communications and the Arts	Liberal	Scott Morrison
Anne Ruston	29 May 2019	23 May 2022	Minister for Families and Social Services	Liberal	Scott Morrison
Katy Gallagher	1 June 2022	Incumbent	Minister for Women; Minister for Finance; Minister for the Public Service	Labor	Anthony Albanese

== See also ==
- Leader of the Government in the Senate (Australia)
- Leader of the House (Australia)
- Manager of Opposition Business in the House (Australia)
