= John Anderson (Australian politician) =

Former Deputy Prime Minister of Australia

The Honourable John Anderson AC FTSE
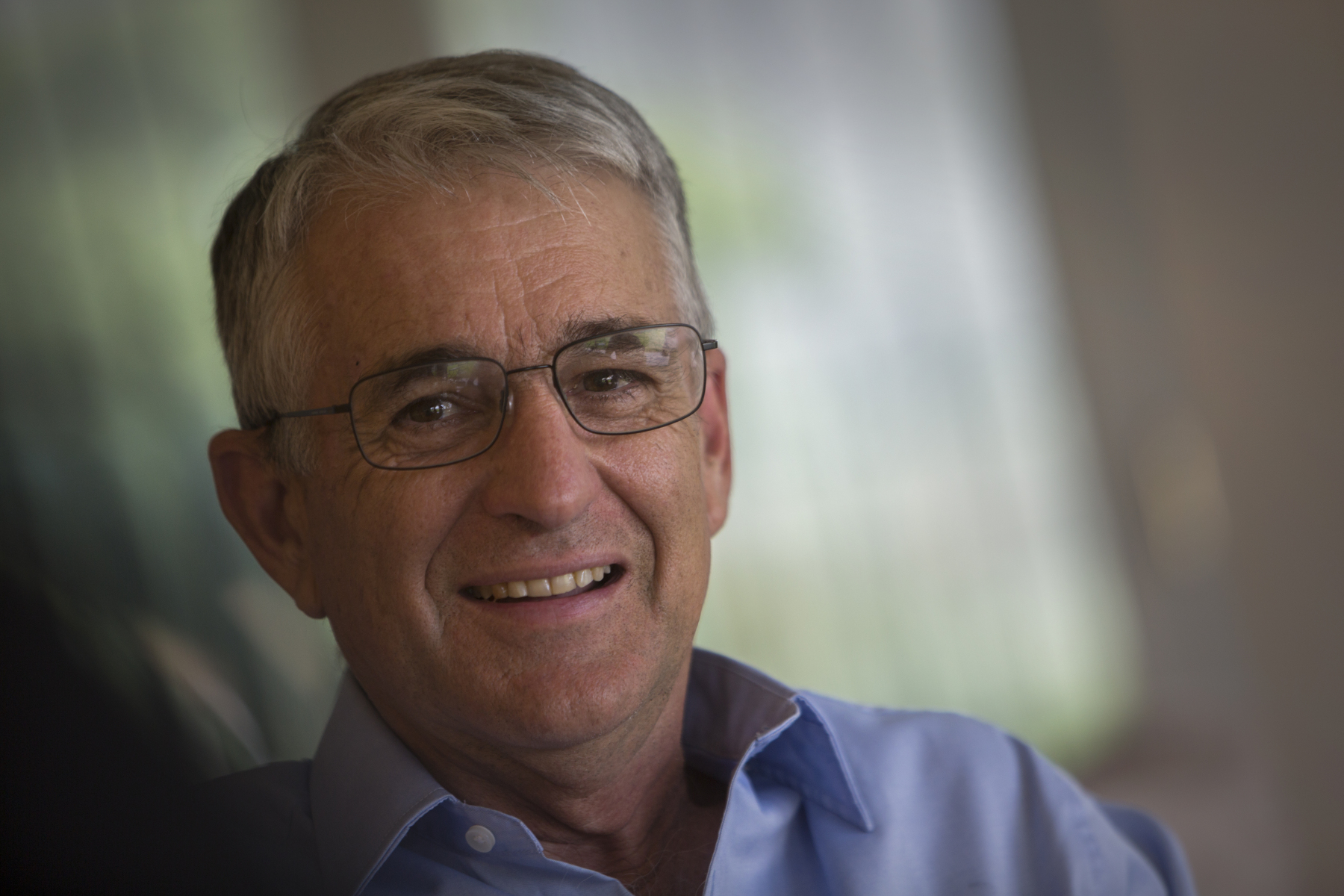
- Anderson in 2017

Deputy Prime Minister of Australia
- In office 20 July 1999 – 6 July 2005
- Prime Minister: John Howard
- Preceded by: Tim Fischer
- Succeeded by: Mark Vaile

Leader of the National Party
- In office 20 July 1999 – 23 June 2005
- Deputy: Mark Vaile
- Preceded by: Tim Fischer
- Succeeded by: Mark Vaile

Minister for Transport and Regional Development
- In office 21 October 1998 – 6 July 2005
- Prime Minister: John Howard
- Preceded by: Mark Vaile
- Succeeded by: Warren Truss

Deputy Leader of the National Party
- In office 23 March 1993 – 20 July 1999
- Leader: Tim Fischer
- Preceded by: Bruce Lloyd
- Succeeded by: Mark Vaile

Minister for Primary Industries and Energy
- In office 11 March 1996 – 21 October 1998
- Prime Minister: John Howard
- Preceded by: Bob Collins
- Succeeded by: Mark Vaile

Member of Parliament for Gwydir
- In office 15 April 1989 – 17 October 2007
- Preceded by: Ralph Hunt
- Succeeded by: Division abolished

Personal details
- Born: 14 November 1956 (age 70) Sydney, New South Wales, Australia
- Party: National Party of Australia
- Spouse: Julia Robertson
- Children: 5
- Education: The King's School, Parramatta, University of Sydney
- Website: johnanderson.net.au

John Duncan Anderson (born 14 November 1956) is an Australian politician and commentator who served as the 11th deputy prime minister of Australia and leader of the National Party from 1999 to 2005. He also served as Minister for Primary Industries and Energy Minister for Transport and Regional Development in the Howard government.

As a government minister and later deputy prime minister, Anderson had cabinet responsibility for primary industry policy, including transport infrastructure and agricultural water rights. He was a member of Australia's National Security Committee from 1999 to 2005 when it faced the war on terror, in particular the Bali bombings.

After politics, Anderson has been published for his views on civic freedoms, global food security, modern slavery and the economy. In 2017 he launched a web-based interview program, Conversations with John Anderson, featuring interviews with public intellectuals. In this role he has advocated for many socially conservative causes, such as the "no" case in the 2023 Australian referendum and the establishment of the Alliance for Responsible Citizenship.

== Early life and education ==
Anderson was born in Sydney on 14 November 1956. He is the son of Duncan Anderson and Beryl Mann. His family had been graziers and landowners of Mullaley in northern New South Wales since the 1840s. Duncan Anderson served with the Australian Light Horse troops in North Africa during World War II.

When he was three years old, John's mother died of cancer. In 1970, his sister Jane died after being struck on the neck by a cricket ball that had been hit by Anderson (then aged 13) while playing cricket at home with his father.

Anderson has described his religious upbringing as "very, very nominal Presbyterian".

Anderson was tutored at home by his aunt, Margaret, through Blackfriars Correspondence School. He attended Gunnedah South Public School in Gunnedah and The King's School in the Sydney suburb of Parramatta, boarding at Waddy House.

He began a degree in arts and laws at the University of Sydney, where he was a resident of St Paul's College, but dropped law shortly after commencing. Anderson graduated with a Bachelor of Arts in history and returned to the family property where he was a farmer and grazier, and completed a Master of Arts during this time.

== Early parliamentary career ==
Anderson became chair of the National Party's Tambar Springs branch in 1984. A few weeks later, MP Frank O'Keefe recommended Anderson run for the seat of Paterson, where he was current member, but the seat was abolished later that year. In 1989, Ralph Hunt, the sitting MP in the neighbouring seat of Gwydir, retired and supported Anderson to replace him. The ensuing pre-selection contest was close with Anderson defeating several contenders, including future independent MP Tony Windsor. Anderson won the election with a two-party preferred result of 56%. His first remarks to the House of Representatives were part of a condolence motion for his mentor, and former MP, Frank O'Keefe. Anderson gave his maiden speech on 17 August 1989.

After the 1990 election, Anderson became Parliamentary Secretary to the Shadow Minister for Industrial Relations, John Howard. After the 1993 election, Anderson was elected deputy leader of the Nationals, defeating three other candidates; Peter McGauran, John Sharp and Bruce Scott; and was appointed Shadow Minister for Primary Industry. In the shadow ministry, he criticised the minister Simon Crean on the government-set price floor for wool.

== Cabinet minister ==
In the 1996 Australian federal election, Anderson made an election promise with John Howard for the establishment of a $1 billion fund to restore the national estate, including programs to arrest soil degradation." He was made the Minister for Primary Industries and Energy and joined the five-person "razor gang" led by Peter Costello with the task of cutting $6 to $8 billion from government expenditure. Anderson advocated that diesel fuel rebates, the Australian Quarantine and Inspection Service and agricultural research and development should be protected from the spending cuts because they "create growth even if they are funded by debt."

=== Minister for Primary Industries and Energy ===
Anderson's three years in the primary industries portfolio were marked by conflict as government protection of primary industries were removed. During this time, the government deregulated the wool, wheat and dairy sectors, and privatised much of the meat and livestock industry. Anderson led a delegation of Australian business leaders to visit Taiwan in September 1996 in his role as primary industries minister, which the People's Republic of China said contravened the One China policy.

In response to the government-owned Australian Wool Corporation (AWC) being left with a surplus of four million bales of unsold wool and a debt of around $2 billion, Anderson and the Coalition government gave wool producers a pay-out of $300 million, drawing down against their equity in the wool stockpile, despite objections from many National Party members who preferred a policy of freezing sales from the stockpile. The government wool-owning entity was entirely privatised, to become Woolstock Australia, by August 2001.

Anderson announced significant restructures of the meat and livestock industry in 1997, which were supported with some reservations by farmers groups, such as NSW Farmers. In 1998, Meat & Livestock Australia was created from the two organisations, with the goal of becoming a less costly, producer-owned service delivery body.

=== Minister for Transport and Regional Development ===
In September 1997, Anderson assumed the portfolio for Transport and Regional Development, giving him responsibility for developing national rail, road and water infrastructure. Anderson oversaw the creation of the Australian Rail Track Corporation, a Commonwealth body set up to own or hold long-term leases over much of the continental rail network.

In response to criticism over industry deregulation, the privatisation of Telstra and gun control laws, Fischer and Anderson scheduled a party meeting on 5 August 1998 to declare their leadership positions vacant, inviting their party room critics, particularly Bob Katter and De-Anne Kelly, to replace them. Anderson and Fischer then nominated for the positions they had vacated and were re-elected unopposed.

During the 1998 federal election, private polling indicated that up to 49% of people in Anderson's seat of Gwydir intended to vote for the new Pauline Hanson's One Nation party. Anderson suffered a 16.18% swing against him with a primary vote of just 46.14%, the only time his first-round votes were below 50%. Anderson himself attributed the decline in his vote to his constant travel.

== Deputy prime minister ==
Following the resignation of deputy prime minister and Nationals leader Tim Fischer, Anderson was elected unopposed as the new leader and became deputy prime minister himself on 20 July 1999. Anderson kept his ministerial responsibilities in Transport and Regional Development and were extended to the delivery of government services, such as health, to regional and remote centres, and a role in the National Security Committee. Anderson also assumed the role of acting prime minister when John Howard was overseas, such as during the September 11 attacks and in the aftermath of the 2002 Bali bombings.

In 2002, Anderson called for laws making it an offence to desecrate the Australian flag.

Anderson's ministerial department was responsible for paying outstanding wages and entitlements for former employees of the insolvent airline Ansett Australia, though allowing it to collapse.

During Anderson's tenure as deputy prime minister, the Coalition government established the National Water Initiative in 2004, allowing producers to gain ongoing access entitlements for a share of water available for use, rather than fixed-term entitlements without guarantee of renewal.

On 17 November 2004, the MP for New England, Tony Windsor, accused Anderson of offering him, via businessman Greg Maguire, a diplomatic or trade posting if Windsor would surrender his seat. As the statement was made under parliamentary privilege, it was protected from litigation for defamation. Anderson strongly repudiated the claims. The Senate Finance and Public Administration References Committee, the Federal Police and the Commonwealth Director of Public Prosecutions found that there were no grounds to support Windsor's allegations.

On the last sitting day of Parliament before the winter recess of 2005, Anderson announced his resignation from the leadership of the National Party, and as deputy prime minister, citing a "debilitating but thankfully benign prostate condition". He was succeeded in both positions by Mark Vaile, and retired from parliament at the 2007 federal election.

== Business and media ==
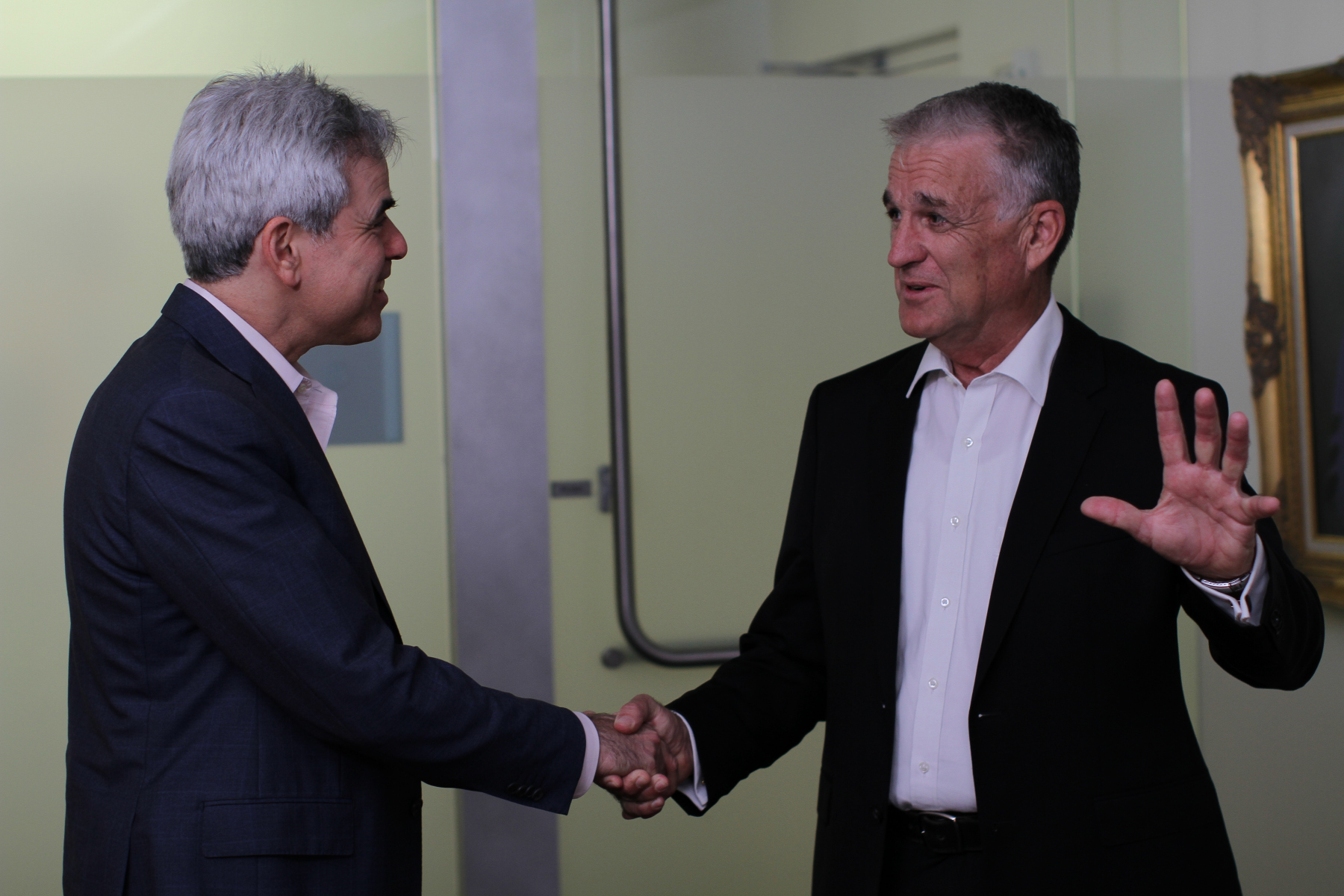
NYU professor Jonathan Haidt meeting Anderson before an interview

Anderson served as chairman of Eastern Star Gas (ESG) from October 2007 until 2011 when the publicly listed company and its flagship Narrabri Gas Project was acquired by Santos in a $924 million deal. He was appointed to the Review Panel for the Act of Recognition in 2013 to provide a report to the Minister for Aboriginal Affairs, along with Tanya Hosch and Richard Eccles. The final report of the panel was published in September 2014.

In the late 2010s, Anderson increased his presence on online media through podcasting and conducting interviews on YouTube, as well as newspaper opinion pieces and television appearances. In 2018, Anderson began hosting a podcast and YouTube channel on which he interviews public figures, including historian Victor Davis Hanson, former chief rabbi Jonathan Sacks, former Labor Party leader Kim Beazley, Jonathan Haidt, Glenn Loury, Niall Ferguson, and psychologist Jordan Peterson.

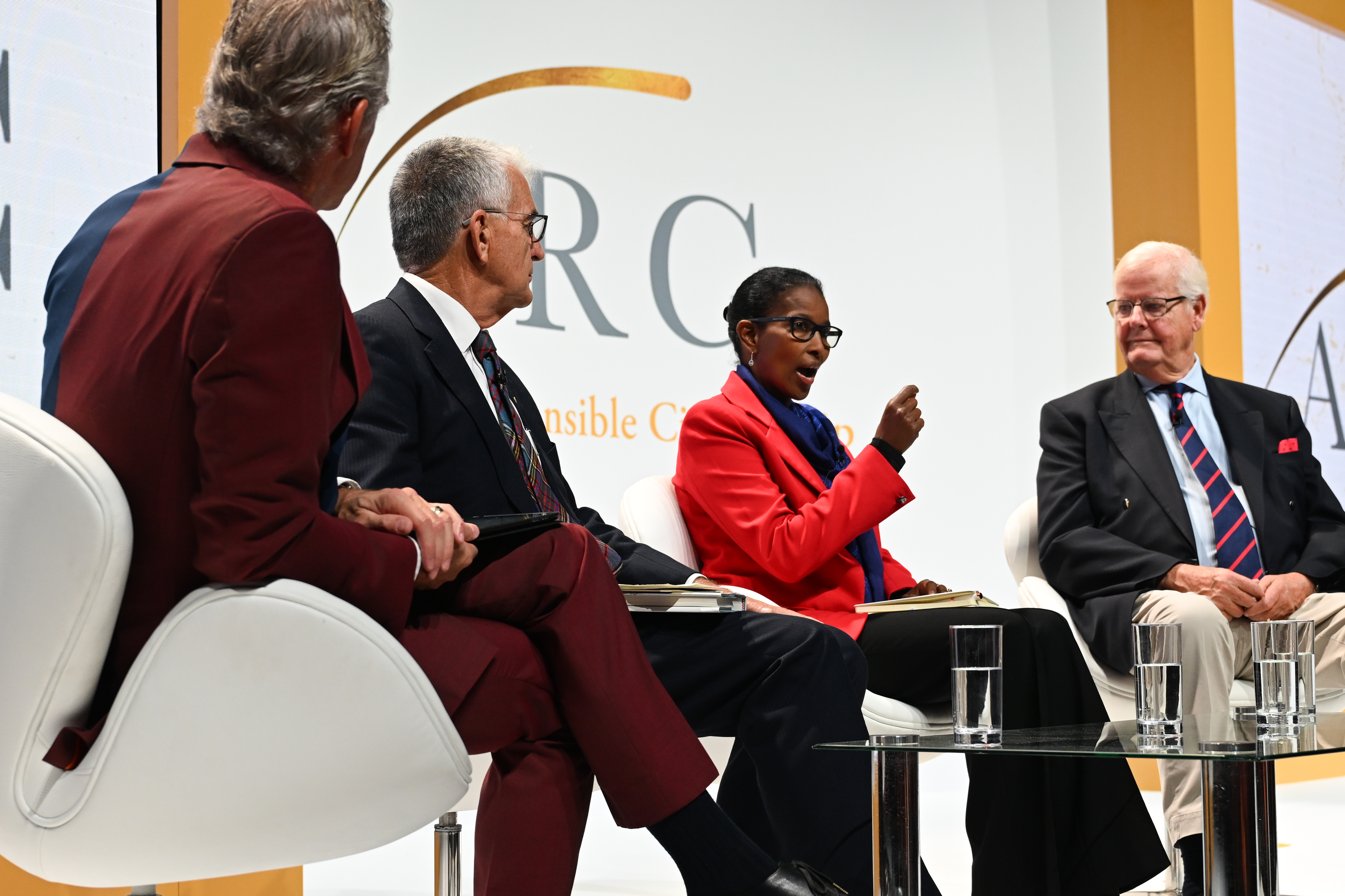
In a panel discussion with Ayaan Hirsi Ali, ARC Conference, London, 2023

With this public position, Anderson has taken notable stands on national and cultural issues. Prior to the 2017 Australian Marriage Law Postal Survey, Anderson was interviewed on ABC television and spoke about his opposition to same-sex marriage. He opposed the Voice to Parliament in the 2023 Australian Indigenous Voice referendum. He formed an advocacy group towards this end alongside Senator Jacinta Nampijinpa Price and Warren Mundine, saying the voice would only "beget divisiveness and cynicism." The referendum was later defeated.

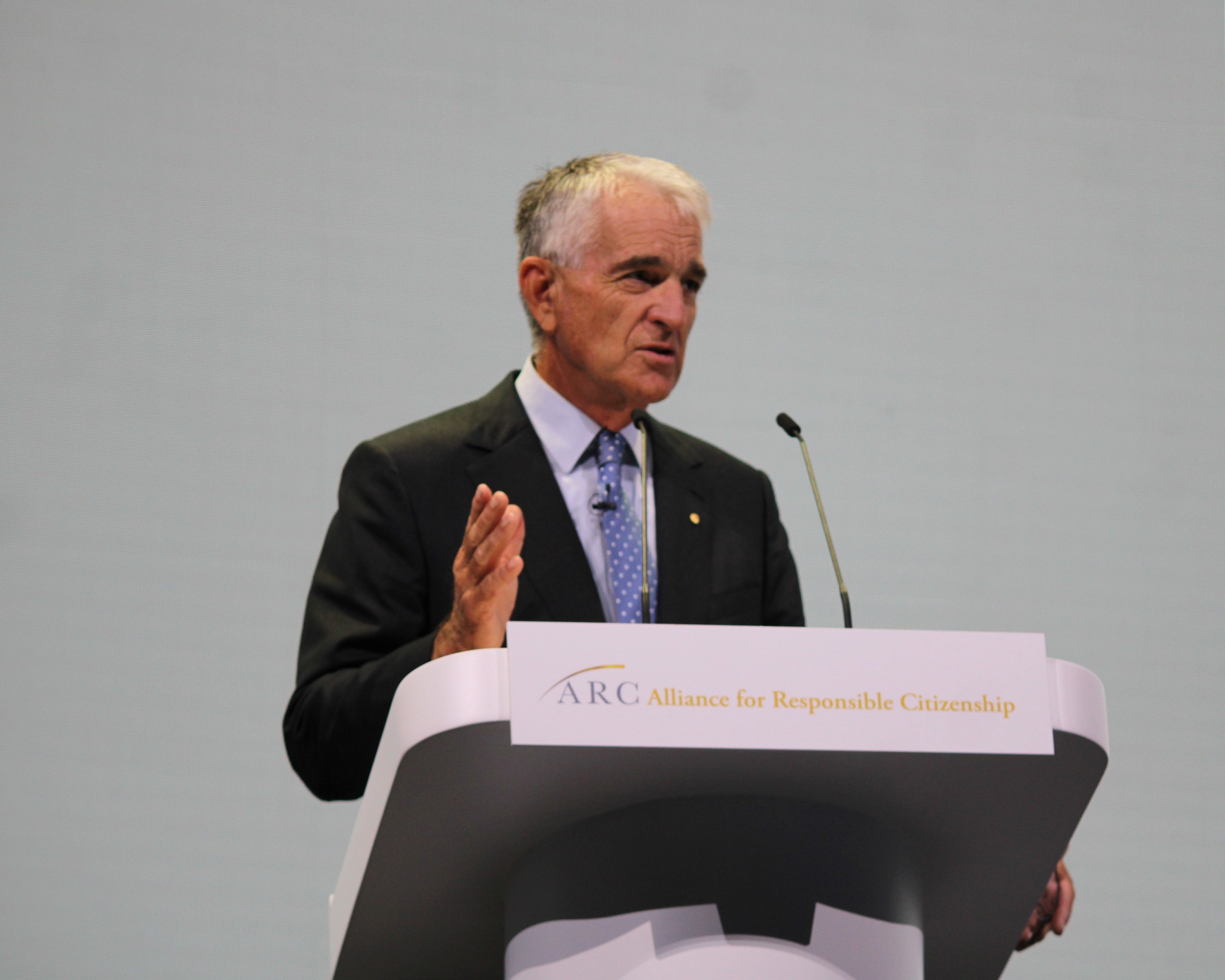
Anderson speaking at the Alliance for Responsible Citizenship, London, 2025

In March 2021, Anderson declared himself a candidate in the National Party's pre-selection for Senate candidacy at the 2022 federal election, but former party director Ross Cadell won the top spot on the Nationals' Senate ticket. Anderson then announced that the political run had come to an end.

Anderson worked with Baroness Stroud, Paul Marshall and Jordan Peterson to found the Alliance for Responsible Citizenship, a socially conservative movement aiming to give Western society "new cohesion and purpose." He spoke at its first global conference in London, in 2023, saying the group emerged as a response to a "civilisational" moment in which the Western world "is plagued by self-doubt and confusion" regarding its values and beliefs.

== Honours ==
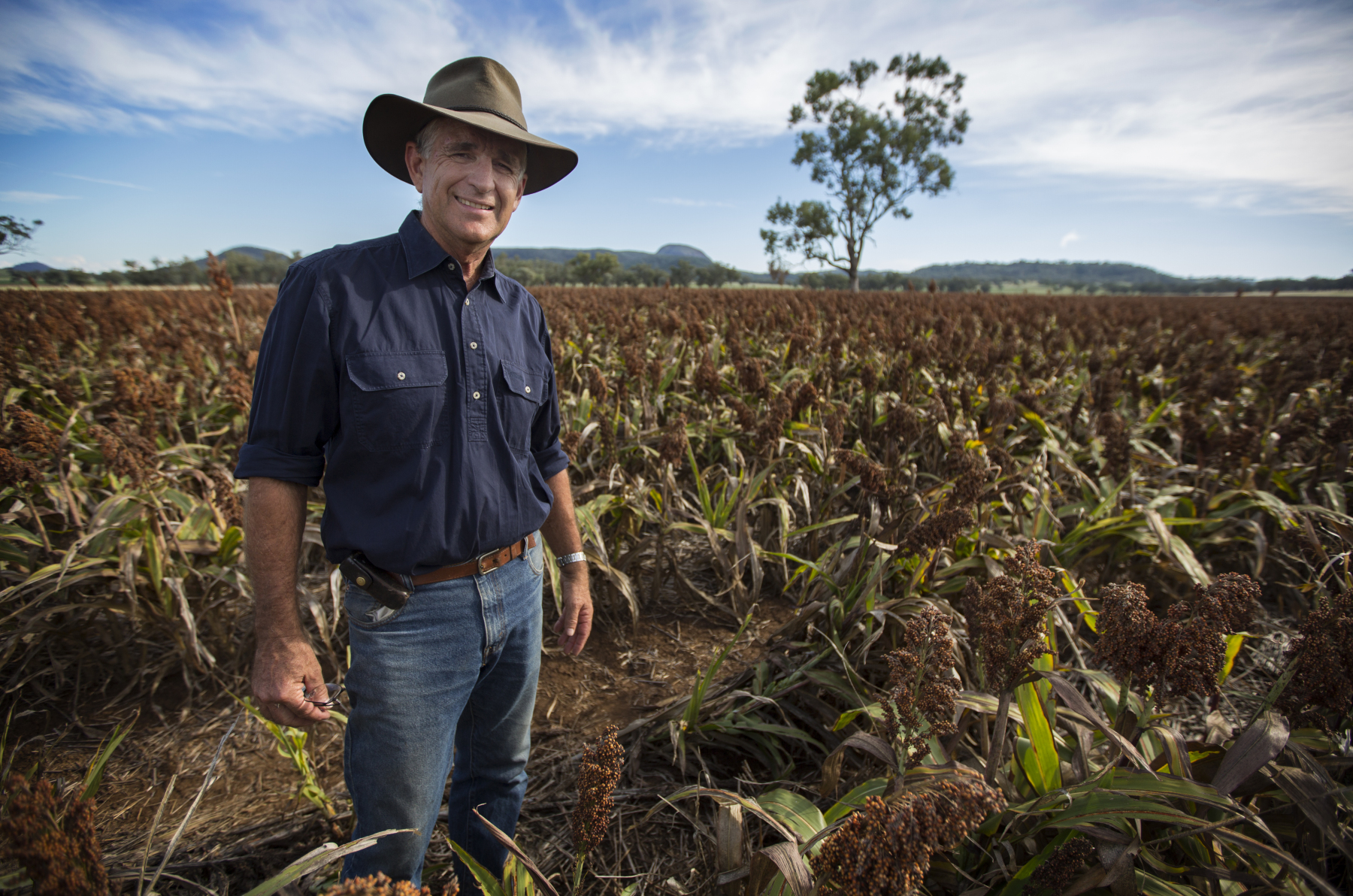
Anderson in a field of sorghum on his property in Newstead, NSW

On 13 June 2011, Anderson was named an Officer of the Order of Australia (AO) in the 2011 Queen's Birthday Honours for "distinguished service to the Parliament of Australia, particularly for supporting rural and regional communities, transport development, and water management initiatives."

In 2019, Anderson was elected a Fellow of the Australian Academy of Technological Sciences and Engineering (FTSE) for sustainable means for agricultural uses in rural Australia.

In June 2022, Anderson was promoted to Companion of the Order of Australia (AC) in the 2022 Queen's Birthday Honours for "eminent service to rural and regional development, to leadership in international agricultural research and food security, to social commentary, and through contributions to not-for-profit organisations".

Political offices
Preceded by Bob Collins	Minister for Primary Industries and Energy; 1996–1998	Succeeded by Mark Vaile
Preceded by Mark Vaile	Minister for Transport and Regional Development; 1998–2005	Succeeded by Warren Truss
Preceded by Tim Fischer	Deputy Prime Minister of Australia; 1999–2005	Succeeded by Mark Vaile
Party political offices
Preceded by Tim Fischer	Leader of the National Party of Australia; 1999–2005	Succeeded by Mark Vaile
Preceded by Bruce Lloyd	Deputy Leader of the National Party of Australia; 1993–1999	Succeeded by Mark Vaile
Parliament of Australia
Preceded by Ralph Hunt	Member for Gwydir; 1989–2007	Division abolished
