= Warren Truss =

Australian politician (born 1948)

The Honourable Warren Truss AC
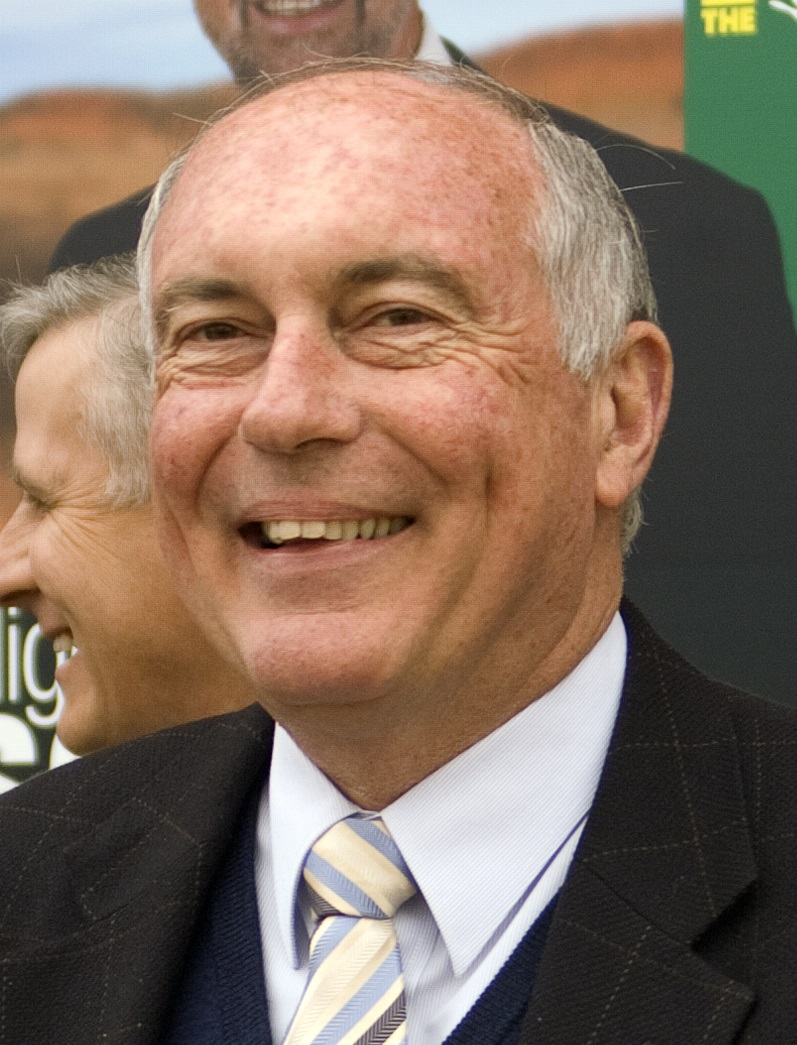
- Truss in 2010

Deputy Prime Minister of Australia
- In office 18 September 2013 – 18 February 2016
- Prime Minister: Tony Abbott; Malcolm Turnbull
- Preceded by: Anthony Albanese
- Succeeded by: Barnaby Joyce

Minister for Infrastructure and Regional Development
- In office 18 September 2013 – 18 February 2016
- Prime Minister: Tony Abbott; Malcolm Turnbull
- Preceded by: Anthony Albanese (Infrastructure and Transport); Sharon Bird (Regional Development)
- Succeeded by: Darren Chester (Infrastructure and Transport); Fiona Nash (Regional Development)

Leader of the National Party
- In office 3 December 2007 – 11 February 2016
- Deputy: Nigel Scullion; Barnaby Joyce
- Preceded by: Mark Vaile
- Succeeded by: Barnaby Joyce

Deputy Leader of the National Party
- In office 23 June 2005 – 3 December 2007
- Leader: Mark Vaile
- Preceded by: Mark Vaile
- Succeeded by: Nigel Scullion

Minister for Trade
- In office 10 August 2006 – 3 December 2007
- Prime Minister: John Howard
- Preceded by: Mark Vaile
- Succeeded by: Simon Crean

Minister for Transport and Regional Services
- In office 6 July 2005 – 10 August 2006
- Prime Minister: John Howard
- Preceded by: John Anderson
- Succeeded by: Mark Vaile

Minister for Agriculture, Fisheries and Forestry
- In office 20 July 1999 – 6 July 2005
- Prime Minister: John Howard
- Preceded by: Mark Vaile
- Succeeded by: Peter McGauran

Member of the Australian Parliament for Wide Bay
- In office 24 March 1990 – 9 May 2016
- Preceded by: Clarrie Millar
- Succeeded by: Llew O'Brien

Councillor for the Shire of Kingaroy
- In office 1976–1990

Personal details
- Born: Warren Errol Truss; 8 October 1948 (age 78) Kingaroy, Queensland, Australia
- Party: Liberal National (since 2008)
- Other political affiliations: Nationals (until 2008)
- Spouse: Lyn Truss
- Website: Official website Warren Truss on Twitter

Warren Errol Truss AC (born 8 October 1948) is a former Australian politician who served as the 16th deputy prime minister of Australia and the minister for Infrastructure and Regional Development in the Abbott government and the Turnbull government. Truss served as the federal leader of the National Party of Australia (The Nationals) between 2007 and 11 February 2016 when he announced his decision to retire and not contest the 2016 federal election. He was the member of the House of Representatives for Wide Bay from the 1990 election until his retirement in May 2016. Following the merger of the Queensland branches of the Nationals and Liberals, Truss was re-elected in 2010 for the Liberal National Party.

== Early life ==
Truss was born in the region of Kingaroy, Queensland. He attended Concordia Lutheran College in Toowoomba. He was a bean farmer before he entered politics. He was chair of the Sugar Coast Burnett Regional Tourism Board and a councillor of the Shire of Kingaroy 1976–90. He was Chairman of Kingaroy Shire Council from 1983 to 1990.

== Political career ==
Truss's first attempt at a parliamentary seat was in the Queensland state parliament as the Nationals candidate at the 1988 Barambah by-election, triggered by the retirement of former premier Joh Bjelke-Petersen. However, Truss lost to Citizens Electoral Council candidate Trevor Perrett, who later joined the National Party.

=== Parliament ===
Truss was elected to the safe National seat of Wide Bay at the 1990 election. He was a member of the Opposition Shadow Ministry 1994–96.

With the Liberal/National Coalition defeating the Australian Labor Party at the 1996 election, Truss was appointed Deputy Leader of the House 1997–98, Minister for Customs and Consumer Affairs 1997–98, and Minister for Community Services 1998–99. He was promoted to the John Howard cabinet and served as Minister for Agriculture, Fisheries and Forestry 1999–2005.

=== Nationals leadership ===
In June 2005 John Anderson announced his intention to resign as National Party Leader. Deputy Leader Mark Vaile was elected the new Leader, and Truss was elected Deputy Leader. In the reshuffled ministry following Anderson's resignation Truss became Minister for Transport and Regional Services.

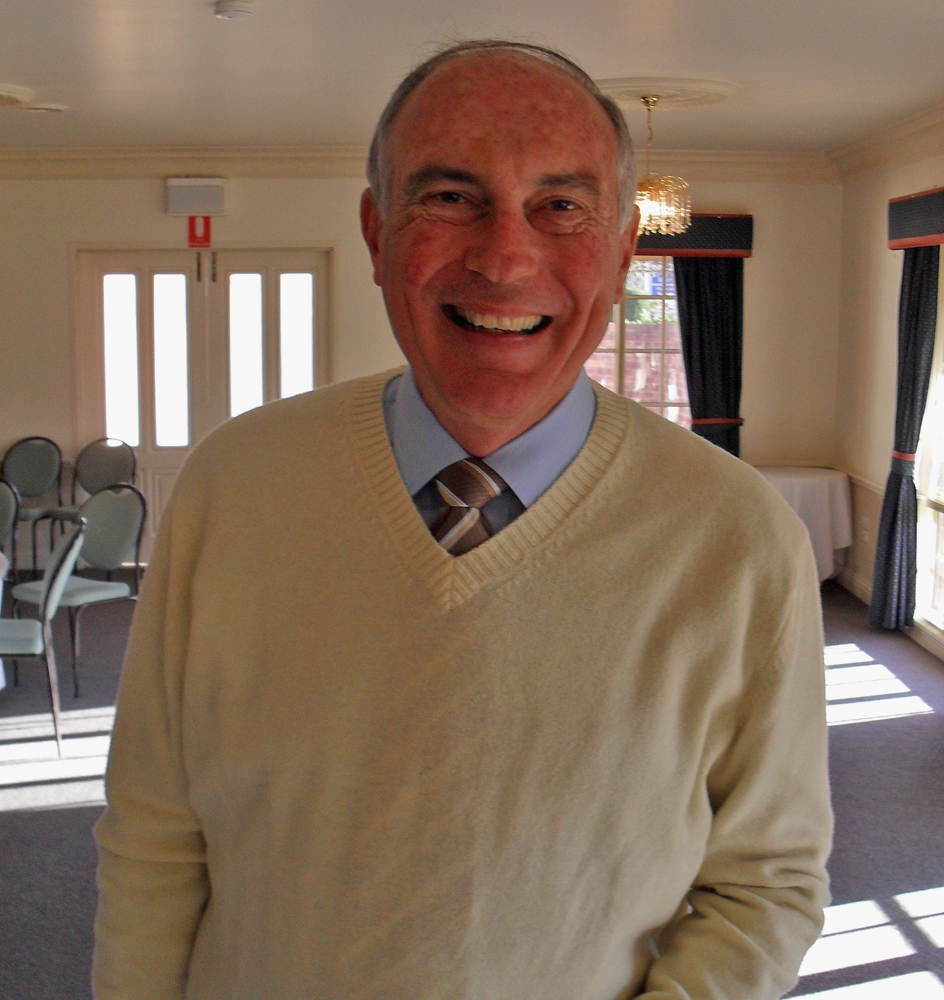
Truss in 2009

In 2006, following the AWB oil for food scandal, Truss and Vaile swapped portfolios, with Truss becoming Minister for Trade and Vaile taking the Transport and Regional Services portfolio until the defeat of the Liberal/National Coalition government at the 2007 election.

After the election, Mark Vaile resigned as National Party Leader, citing the party's need for "generational renewal". With some reluctance, Truss nominated for the leadership, and was elected as federal leader of the Nationals on 3 December 2007.

In 2008, Coalition leader Malcolm Turnbull appointed Truss as Shadow Minister for Trade, Transport, Regional Development and Local Government. He retained that portfolio after Tony Abbott became Coalition leader in late 2009. Following the 2010 election, Truss became Shadow Minister for Infrastructure and Transport. At this election, Truss was elected for the Liberal National Party, which had been formed from the 2009 merger of the two non-Labor parties' Queensland branches. However, he continued to sit as a National, and remained the Nationals' federal leader.

As of 2013, Truss is the most recent National party leader who has run in two consecutive elections.

=== Deputy Prime Minister ===
Truss retained his seat in the 2013 federal election, in which the Coalition was elected to a strong majority government. On 18 September, Truss was sworn in as Deputy Prime Minister, per a longstanding agreement between the Liberals and Nationals. The leader of the Nationals has ranked second in all but two non-Labor governments since the Coalition was first formed in 1923.

Truss remained Deputy Prime Minister after Turnbull deposed Abbott in a 2015 leadership spill. On 11 February 2016 Truss announced his decision to retire from politics at the 2016 federal election and immediately resigned as Nationals leader and Deputy Prime Minister. Barnaby Joyce was elected as leader and was sworn as the Deputy Prime Minister. Truss also resigned from cabinet and returned to the backbench.

Truss's leadership of the Nationals was considered steady, albeit rarely visible. Despite being the number-two man in the government, Truss was relatively unknown; only one in five Australians were familiar with him. He lifted the party's representation in the House of Representatives from ten seats in 2007 to 15 seats in 2013.

== Honours and awards ==
On 1 January 2001, Truss was awarded the Centenary Medal for "service as Minister for Agriculture, Fisheries and Forestry".

In 2014, the South Burnett Regional Council named their Kingaroy Chambers the "Warren Truss Chamber" in recognition of Truss's time as Mayor of the former Kingaroy Shire.

Truss was appointed a Companion of the Order of Australia in the 2019 Australia Day Honours for "eminent service to the Parliament of Australia, particularly in the areas of trade, transport, agriculture, and rural and regional development".

=== Popular references ===
In the American television series Lost, Warren Truss was briefly referenced as having been assaulted in a bar fight by main character James "Sawyer" Ford (Josh Holloway), though the conflict and Truss himself are never onscreen.

Parliament of Australia
Preceded by Clarrie Millar	Member of Parliament for Wide Bay; 1990–2016	Succeeded by Llew O'Brien
Political offices
Preceded by Chris Ellison	Minister for Customs and Consumer Affairs; 1997–1998	Succeeded by Amanda Vanstone
Preceded by Judi Moylan	Minister for Community Services; 1998–1999	Succeeded by Larry Anthony
Preceded by Mark Vaile	Minister for Agriculture, Fisheries and Forestry; 1999–2005	Succeeded by Peter McGauran
Preceded by John Anderson	Minister for Transport and Regional Services; 2005–2006	Succeeded by Mark Vaile
Preceded by Mark Vaile	Minister for Trade; 2006–2007	Succeeded by Simon Crean
Preceded by Anthony Albanese	Deputy Prime Minister of Australia; 2013–2016	Succeeded by Barnaby Joyce
Preceded by Anthony Albanese as Minister for Infrastructure and Transport	Minister for Infrastructure and Regional Development; 2013–2016	Succeeded by Darren Chester as Minister for Infrastructure and Transport
Preceded by Sharon Bird as Minister for Regional Development	Minister for Infrastructure and Regional Development; 2013–2016	Succeeded by Fiona Nash as Minister for Regional Development
Party political offices
Preceded by Mark Vaile	Deputy Leader of the National Party of Australia; 2005–2007	Succeeded by Nigel Scullion
Preceded by Mark Vaile	Leader of the Nationals; 2007–2016	Succeeded by Barnaby Joyce
