= Mark Vaile =

Australian politician, 12th deputy prime minister of Australia

The Honourable Mark Vaile AO
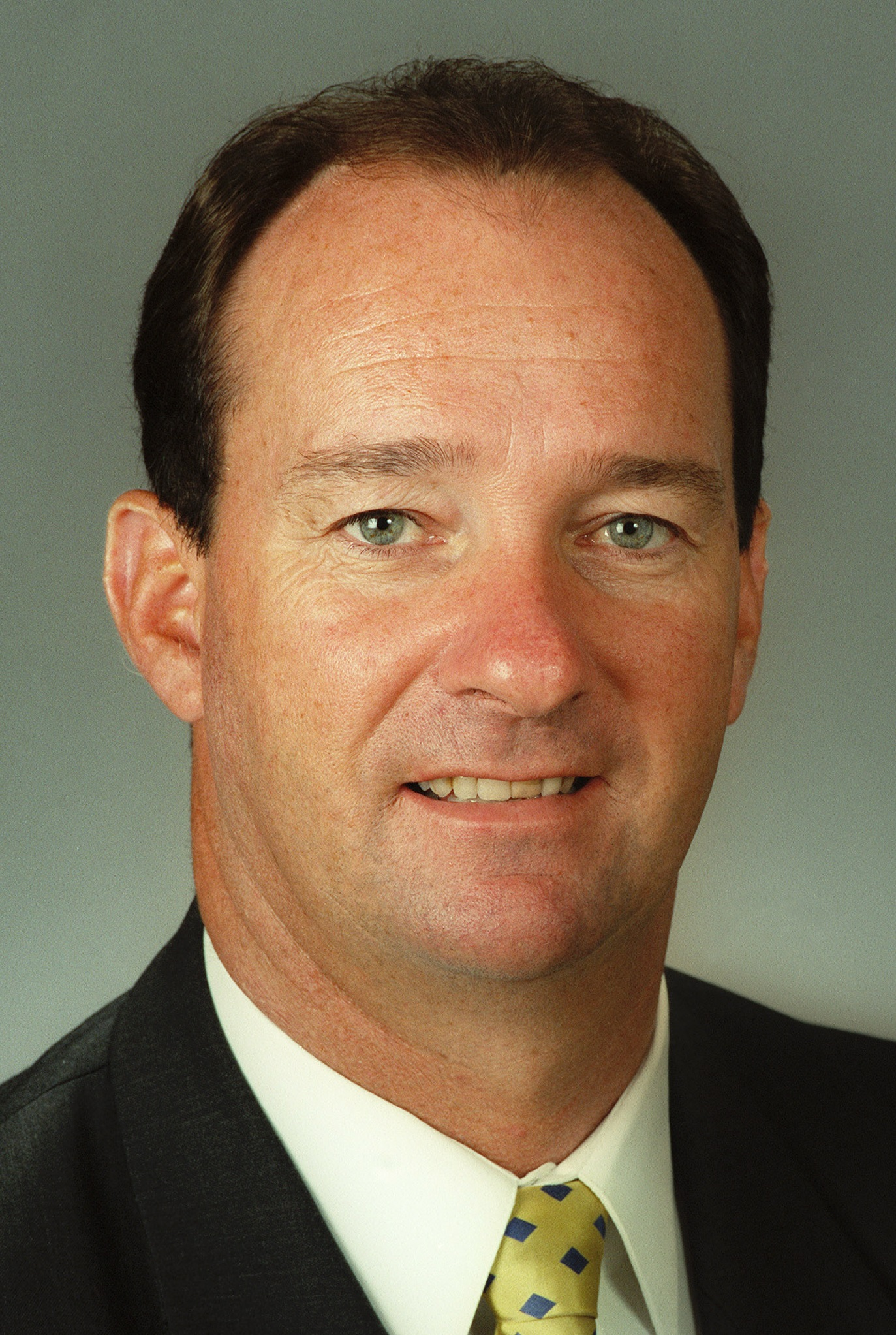

Deputy Prime Minister of Australia
- In office 6 July 2005 – 3 December 2007
- Prime Minister: John Howard
- Preceded by: John Anderson
- Succeeded by: Julia Gillard

Leader of the National Party
- In office 23 June 2005 – 3 December 2007
- Deputy: Warren Truss
- Preceded by: John Anderson
- Succeeded by: Warren Truss

Deputy Leader of the National Party
- In office 1 July 1999 – 23 June 2005
- Leader: John Anderson
- Preceded by: John Anderson
- Succeeded by: Warren Truss

Minister for Transport and Regional Development
- In office 25 September 1997 – 21 October 1998
- Prime Minister: John Howard
- Preceded by: John Sharp
- Succeeded by: John Anderson
- In office 29 September 2006 – 3 December 2007
- Prime Minister: John Howard
- Preceded by: Warren Truss
- Succeeded by: Anthony Albanese

Minister for Agriculture, Fisheries and Forestry
- In office 21 October 1998 – 19 July 1999
- Prime Minister: John Howard
- Preceded by: John Anderson
- Succeeded by: Warren Truss

Minister for Trade and Investment
- In office 20 July 1999 – 19 September 2006
- Prime Minister: John Howard
- Preceded by: Tim Fischer
- Succeeded by: Warren Truss

Member of the Australian Parliament for Lyne
- In office 13 March 1993 – 30 July 2008
- Preceded by: Bruce Cowan
- Succeeded by: Rob Oakeshott

Personal details
- Born: Mark Anthony James Vaile; 18 April 1956 (age 70) Sydney
- Party: National Party of Australia

Mark Anthony James Vaile AO (born 18 April 1956) is an Australian former politician who served as the 12th deputy prime minister of Australia and the leader of the National Party of Australia from 2005 to 2007, during the final years of the Howard government. Vaile is currently a non-executive director of a number of public listed corporations.

== Early life ==
Vaile was born in Sydney and worked as a farm machinery retailer and stock and station and real-estate agent before entering politics. He was a member of the Greater Taree City Council 1985–93, including three years as deputy mayor.

== Parliamentary career ==
Vaile was a member of the Australian House of Representatives between March 1993 and July 2008, representing the Division of Lyne in New South Wales. In his first bid for the seat, in the 1993 election, Vaile led over the Liberals by only 233 votes on the third count, despite the seat's long history as a National stronghold. Labor had taken a large first-count lead which it held for most of the night, but Vaile won after Liberal preferences flowed overwhelmingly to him. However, had 120 votes gone the other way, the Liberals would have taken the seat. Vaile was able to revert the seat to its traditional status as a safe National seat in 1996, and he would go on to hold the seat without serious difficulty from then onward.

He was Assistant National Party Whip 1994–96 and National Party Whip 1996–97. In 1997 he was appointed Minister for Transport and Regional Development, and in 1998 he became Minister for Agriculture, Fisheries and Forestry. In July 1999, following the resignation of Tim Fischer and the election of John Anderson as National Party leader, he was elected the party's Deputy Leader and became Minister for Trade. When John Anderson resigned in 2005, Vaile was elected Leader unopposed. On 6 July 2005 he was sworn in as Deputy Prime Minister.

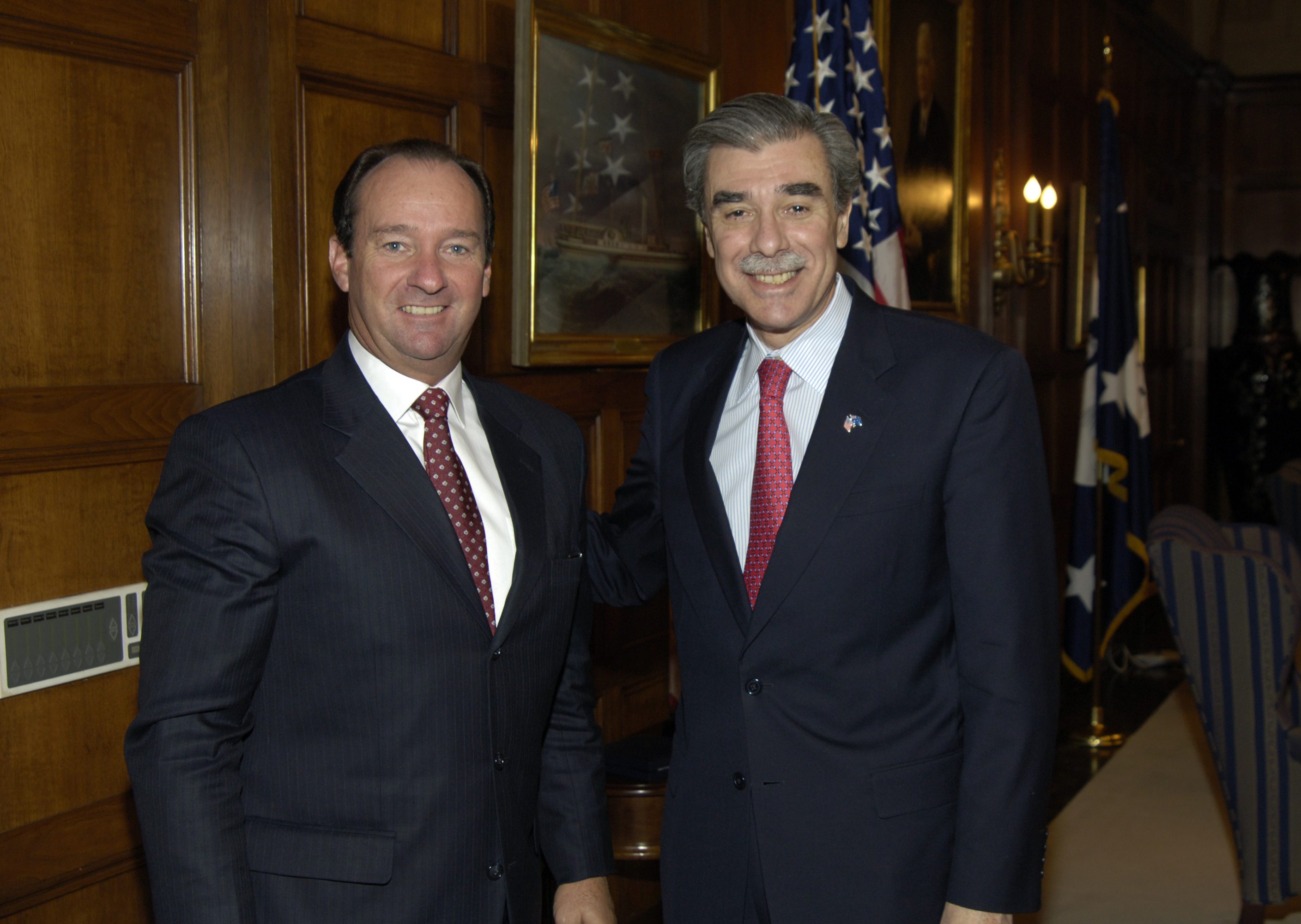
Vaile with US Secretary of Commerce Carlos Gutierrez in March 2006

As Trade Minister, Vaile was involved in the negotiation of the US–Australia Free Trade Agreement, which was opposed by some traditional National Party constituencies such as the sugar industry.

There was much controversy over the intellectual property chapter of the US–Australia Free Trade Agreement. The chapter contains elements modelled on the Sonny Bono Copyright Term extension Act 1998 (US) and the Digital Millennium Copyright Act 1998 (US) In December 2003, Trade Minister Mark Vaile pledged to defend the copyright term in Australia: "It is a very important issue, particularly in terms of cost to libraries, educational institutions and the like here in Australia." Two months later, Australia agreed to a copyright term extension, as part of the deal with the United States. There was also much criticism of the adoption of a US-style technological protection measures – particularly as the High Court of Australia was considering the matter of Stevens v Sony. There was also controversy over the evergreening of pharmaceutical drug patents and access to essential medicines under the US–Australia Free Trade Agreement.

During 2005 he also conducted negotiations for the proposed Australia–China Free Trade Agreement. In late 2005 he had an operation to remove a melanoma from his back.

Since Vaile took on the leadership of the Nationals in 2005, there were increasing suggestions for Vaile to take on a domestic portfolio as the trade portfolio requires frequent overseas travel. Throughout 2006, Vaile's position in the trade portfolio came under increasing scrutiny due to his handling of the AWB kickbacks scandal and Australia's worsening trade performance. He also faced the difficult task of placating his back bench, with Queensland Senator Barnaby Joyce having crossed the floor on more than one occasion. On 24 September 2006 he switched portfolios with deputy Nationals leader Warren Truss and became Minister for Transport and Regional Services. His new position had a greater focus on regional Australia, the Nationals party's main constituency.

Following the coalition's defeat at the 2007 federal election, Vaile resigned his position as Nationals leader and moved to the backbench. His resignation surprised his colleagues as he had been expected to be re-elected unopposed following the election. On 19 July 2008 Vaile announced his forthcoming resignation from Parliament; he submitted it on 30 July. The ensuing by-election was won by independent Rob Oakeshott, the former state member for Port Macquarie and a former Vaile staffer.

== Post-parliament career ==
In September 2008, Vaile was appointed to the board of Virgin Australia Holdings. He was replaced by Angus Houston in December 2018.

Vaile is also the independent chairman and a non-executive director of Whitehaven Coal, non-executive director of Palisade Investment Partners, a specialist independent infrastructure manager; a non-executive director of Hostplus, a non-executive director of Servcorp; a director of the Singapore-listed Stamford Land Corporation; and Chairman of 123 Childcare, an education provider in the People's Republic of China.

In June 2021 it was announced that Vaile would succeed Paul Jeans as Chancellor of the University of Newcastle. However following a backlash over his links to the coal industry, Vaile did not take up the post.

== Honours ==
On 1 January 2001, Vaile was awarded the Centenary Medal for "service as Minister for Trade". In 2012 he was appointed an Officer of the Order of Australia for distinguished service to the Parliament of Australia, through support for rural and regional communities, to the pursuit of global trade and investment opportunities, and to the citizens of the Taree region.

== Personal ==
A Roman Catholic, Vaile is married with three children. He lives on a 40-hectare (100-acre) rural property outside Taree, New South Wales.

Political offices
Preceded by John Sharp	Minister for Transport and Regional Development; 1997–1999	Succeeded by John Anderson
Preceded by John Anderson	Minister for Agriculture, Fisheries and Forestry; 1998–1999	Succeeded by Warren Truss
Preceded by Tim Fischer	Minister for Trade; 1999–2006	Succeeded by Warren Truss
Preceded by Warren Truss	Minister for Transport and Regional Services; 2006–2007	Succeeded by Anthony Albanese
Preceded by John Anderson	Deputy Prime Minister of Australia; 2005–2007	Succeeded by Julia Gillard
Party political offices
Preceded by John Anderson	Leader of the National Party of Australia; 2005–2007	Succeeded by Warren Truss
Preceded by John Anderson	Deputy Leader of the National Party of Australia; 1999–2005	Succeeded by Warren Truss
Parliament of Australia
Preceded by Bruce Cowan	Member for Lyne; 1993–2008	Succeeded by Rob Oakeshott
