= National Party of Australia =

Australian political party

- Abbreviation: NP; NAT; NPA
- Leader: Matt Canavan
- Deputy Leader: Darren Chester
- Senate Leader: Bridget McKenzie
- President: Kay Hull
- Founder: William McWilliams; Earle Page; ... and others
- Founded: 22 January 1920; 106 years ago
- Headquarters: John McEwen House, Barton, Australian Capital Territory
- Think tank: Page Research Centre
- Youth wing: Young Nationals
- Women's wing: Nationals Women
- Membership (2021): ▼9,631 (estimate)
- Ideology: Agrarianism; Conservatism (Australian)
- Political position: Right-wing
- National affiliation: Liberal–National Coalition (since 2026)
- Colours: Green; Yellow
- Governing body: Federal Council
- Party branches: NSW; NT (Note: The Country Liberal Party was formed as a merger of the Northern Territory branches of the Country Party (today the National Party) and the Liberal Party. It mainly functions at the territory-level.); Qld (Note: The Liberal National Party of Queensland was formed as a merger of the Queensland branch of the Liberal Party and the National Party. It mainly functions at the state-level.); SA; Tas; Vic; WA
- House of Representatives: 14 / 150 (Note: Including the six Liberal National MPs who sit in the National party room.)
- Senate: 4 / 76 (Note: Including the two Liberal National Senators who sit in the National party room.)

Website
- nationals.org.au

The National Party of Australia, commonly known as the Nationals or the Nats, is an agrarian, conservative, and right-wing political party in Australia. Traditionally representing graziers, farmers, and rural voters generally, it was founded as the Australian Country Party in 1920 at a federal level. In 1975, it adopted the name National Country Party, before taking its current name in 1982.

The National Party is the junior partner in a conservative electoral alliance known in Australian politics as the Liberal–National Coalition, accompanied by the predominantly urban-based Liberal Party of Australia. When in government, the leader of the National Party has traditionally served as the deputy prime minister. The current leader of the party is Matt Canavan, who assumed office on 11 March 2026.

Due to the closeness and integration of the two parties, as well as the declining vote of the Nationals in recent years, it has been proposed several times that the Liberals and the Nationals formally merge. In Queensland, the Country Party (later National Party) was the senior coalition party between 1925 and 2008, after which it merged with the junior Liberal Party to form the Liberal National Party of Queensland.

The Coalition has been dissolved on various occasions following electoral defeats or policy disputes between the parties, however, it has typically re-formed each upcoming federal election in these instances. The coalition arrangement varies in each state and territory.

== History ==
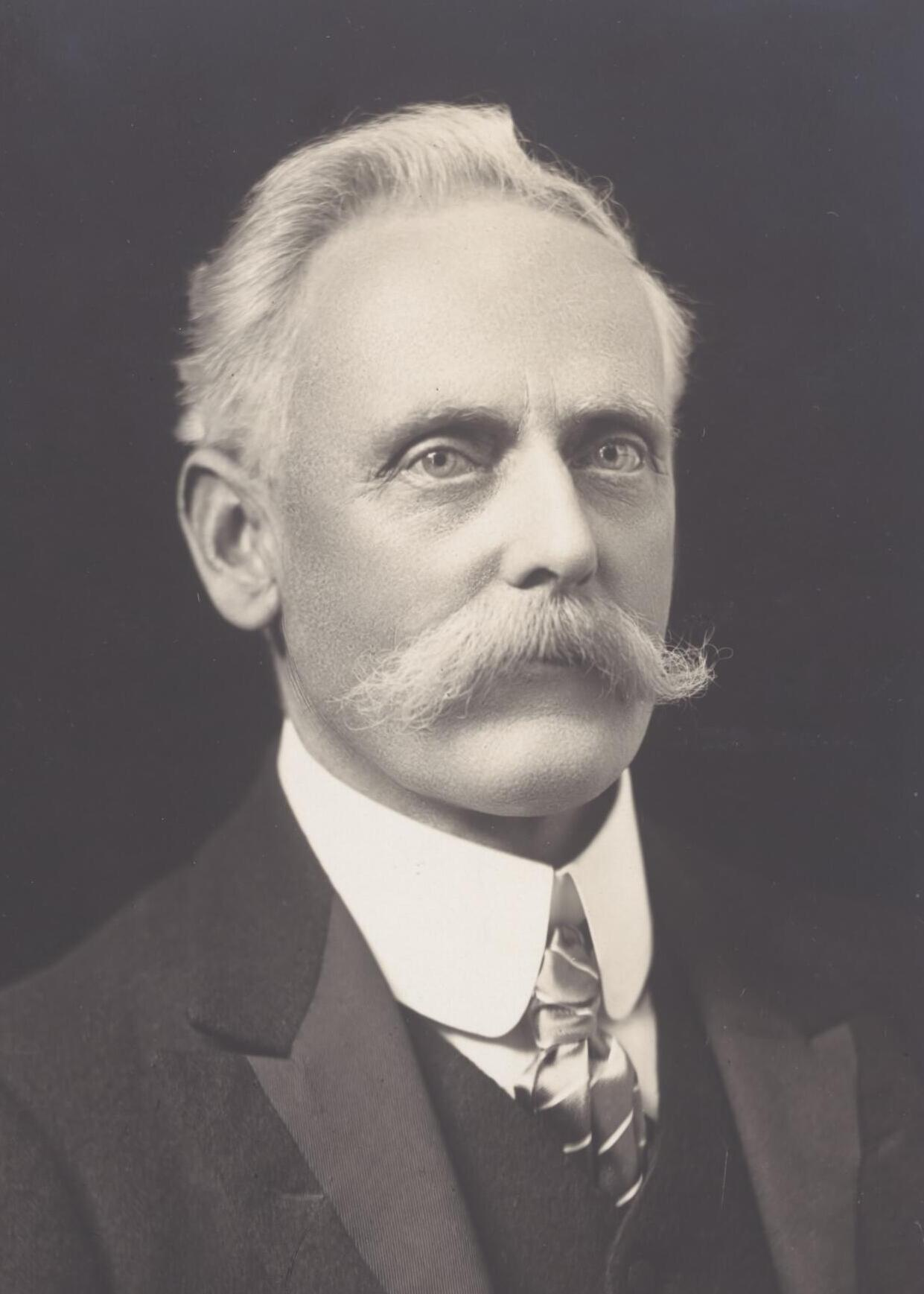
William McWilliams, Country Party leader 1920–1921

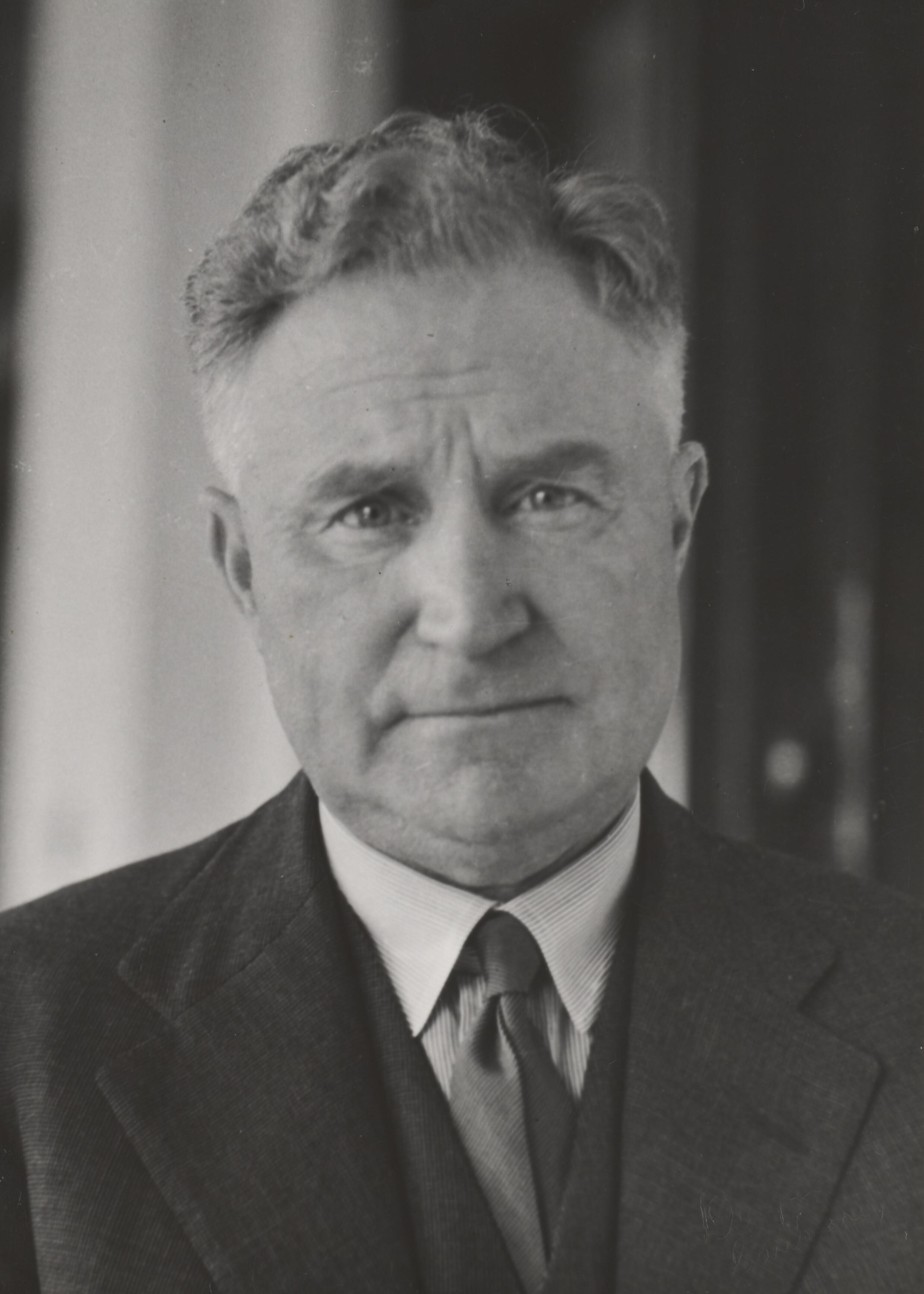
Sir Earle Page, Prime Minister of Australia 1939

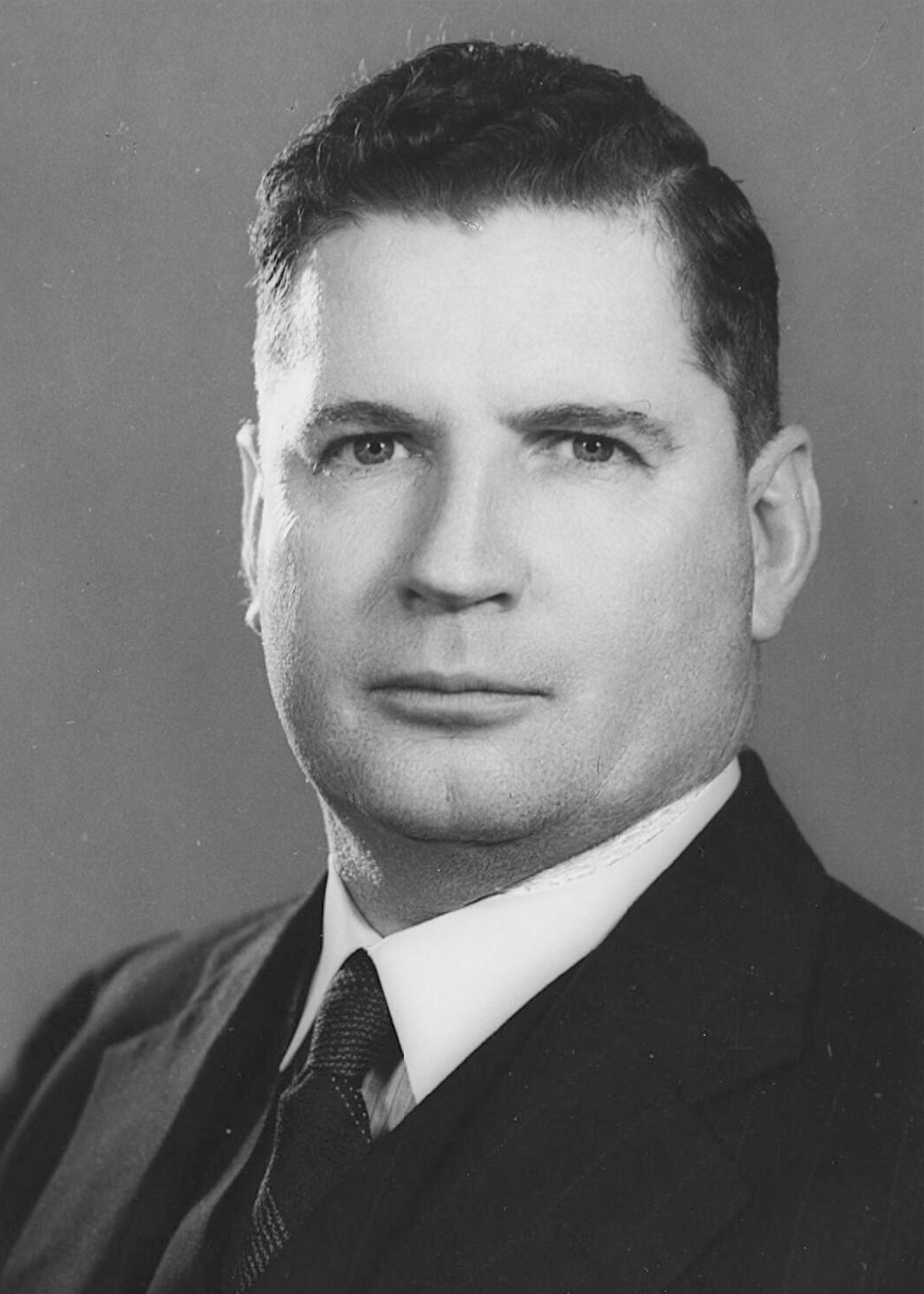
Sir Arthur Fadden, Prime Minister of Australia 1941

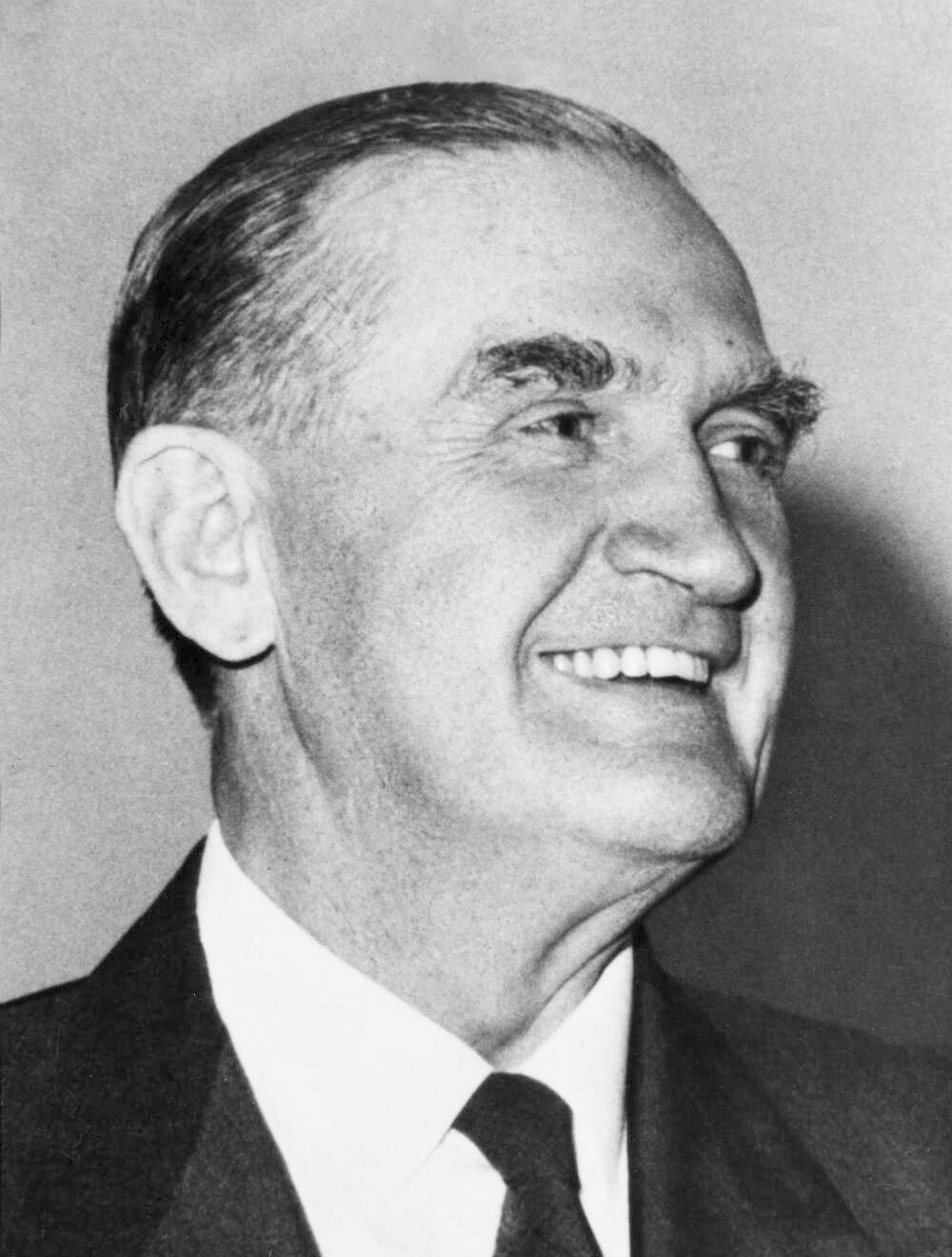
Sir John McEwen, Prime Minister of Australia 1967–68

The Country Party was formally founded in 1913 in Western Australia, and nationally in 1920, from a number of state-based parties such as the Victorian Farmers' Union (VFU) and the Farmers' and Settlers' Association of New South Wales. Australia's first Country Party was founded in 1912 by Harry J. Stephens, editor of The Farmer & Settler, but, under fierce opposition from rival newspapers, failed to gain momentum.

The VFU won a seat in the House of Representatives at the Corangamite by-election held in December 1918, with the help of the newly introduced preferential voting system. At the 1919 federal election the state-based Country Parties won federal seats in New South Wales, Victoria and Western Australia. They also began to win seats in state parliaments. In 1920 the Country Party was established as a national party led by William McWilliams from Tasmania. In his first speech as leader, McWilliams laid out the principles of the new party, stating "we crave no alliance, we spurn no support but we intend drastic action to secure closer attention to the needs of primary producers" McWilliams was deposed as party leader in favour of Earle Page in April 1921, following instances where McWilliams voted against the party line. McWilliams later left the Country Party to sit as an Independent.

According to historian B. D. Graham (1959), the graziers who operated the sheep stations were politically conservative. They disliked the Labor Party, which represented their workers, and feared that Labor governments would pass unfavorable legislation and listen to foreigners and communists. The graziers were satisfied with the marketing organisation of their industry, opposed any change in land tenure and labour relations, and advocated lower tariffs, low freight rates, and low taxes. On the other hand, Graham reports, the small farmers, not the graziers, founded the Country party. The farmers advocated government intervention in the market through price support schemes and marketing pools. The graziers often politically and financially supported the Country party, which in turn made the Country party more conservative.

The Country Party's first election as a united party, in 1922, saw it in an unexpected position of power. It won enough seats to deny the Nationalists an overall majority. It soon became apparent that the price for Country support would be a full-fledged coalition with the Nationalists. However, Page let it be known that his party would not serve under Hughes, and forced his resignation. Page then entered negotiations with the Nationalists' new leader, Stanley Bruce, for a coalition government. Page wanted five seats for his Country Party in a cabinet of 11, including the Treasurer portfolio and the second rank in the ministry for himself. These terms were unusually stiff for a prospective junior coalition partner in a Westminster system, and especially so for such a new party. With no other politically realistic coalition partner available, Bruce agreed, and the "Bruce-Page Ministry" was formed. This began the tradition of the Country Party leader ranking second in Coalition cabinets. The party has never had a coalition government with Labor as of 2025.

Page remained dominant in the party until 1939, and briefly served as caretaker prime minister between the death of Joseph Lyons and the election of Robert Menzies as his successor. However, Page gave up the leadership rather than serve under Menzies. The coalition was re-formed under Archie Cameron in 1940, and continued until October 1941 despite the election of Arthur Fadden as leader after the 1940 election. Fadden was well regarded within conservative circles and proved to be a loyal deputy to Menzies in the difficult circumstances of 1941. When Menzies was forced to resign as prime minister, the UAP was so bereft of leadership that Fadden briefly succeeded him (despite the Country Party being the junior partner in the governing coalition). However, the two independents who had been propping up the government rejected Fadden's budget and brought the government down. Fadden stood down in favour of Labor leader John Curtin.

The Fadden-led Coalition made almost no headway against Curtin, and was severely defeated in the 1943 election. After that loss, Fadden became deputy leader of the opposition under Menzies, a role that continued after Menzies folded the UAP into the Liberal Party of Australia in 1944. Fadden remained a loyal partner of Menzies, though he was still keen to assert the independence of his party. Indeed, in the lead up to the 1949 federal election, Fadden played a key role in the defeat of the Chifley Labor government, frequently making inflammatory claims about the "socialist" nature of the Labor Party, which Menzies could then "clarify" or repudiate as he saw fit, thus appearing more "moderate". In 1949, Fadden became Treasurer in the second Menzies government and remained so until his retirement in 1958. His successful partnership with Menzies was one of the elements that sustained the coalition, which remained in office until 1972 (Menzies himself retired in 1966).

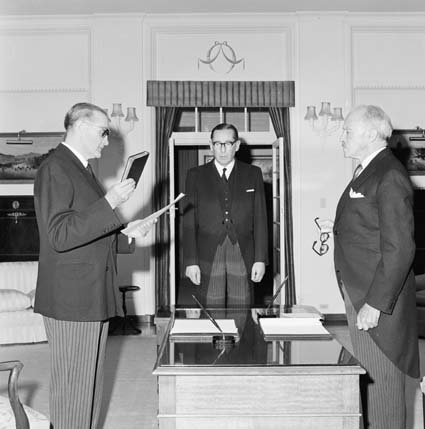
John McEwen being sworn in as Prime Minister on 19 December 1967.

Fadden's successor, Trade Minister John McEwen, took the then unusual step of declining to serve as treasurer, believing he could better ensure that the interests of Australian primary producers were safeguarded. Accordingly, McEwen personally supervised the signing of the first post-war trade treaty with Japan, new trade agreements with New Zealand and Britain, and Australia's first trade agreement with the USSR (1965). In addition to this, he insisted on developing an all-encompassing system of tariff protection that would encourage the development of those secondary industries that would "value add" Australia's primary produce. His success in this endeavour is sometimes dubbed "McEwenism". This was the period of the Country Party's greatest power, as was demonstrated in 1962 when McEwen was able to insist that Menzies sack a Liberal minister who claimed that Britain's entry into the European Economic Community was unlikely to severely impact the Australian economy as a whole.

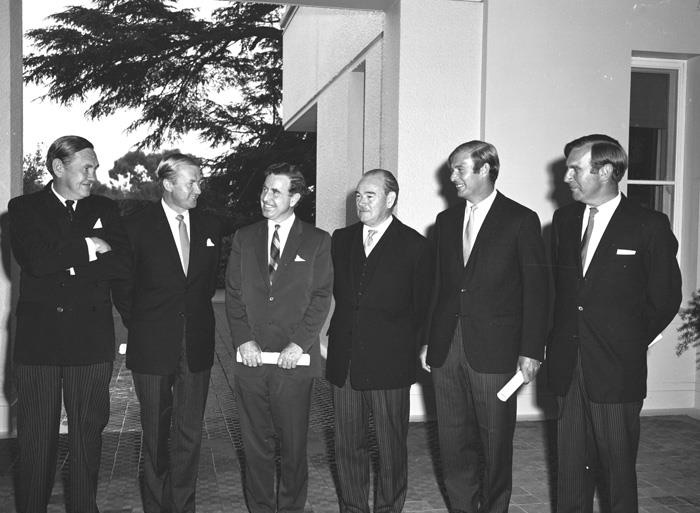
Prime Minister John Gorton and new Deputy Prime Minister Doug Anthony at the swearing-in of new Country Party ministers to the Second Gorton Ministry on 5 February 1971 following the retirement of McEwen.

Menzies retired in 1966 and was succeeded by Harold Holt. McEwen thus became the longest-tenured member of the government, with the informal right to veto government policy. The most significant instance in which McEwen exercised this right came when Holt disappeared in December 1967. John Gorton became the new Liberal prime minister in January 1968. McEwen was sworn in as interim prime minister pending the election of the new Liberal leader. Logically, the Liberals' deputy leader, William McMahon, should have succeeded Holt. However, McMahon was a staunch free-trader, and there were also rumours that he was homosexual. As a result, McEwen told the Liberals that he and his party would not serve under McMahon. McMahon stood down in favour of John Gorton. It was only after McEwen announced his retirement that McMahon was able to successfully challenge Gorton for the Liberal leadership. McEwen's reputation for political toughness led to him being nicknamed "Black Jack" by his allies and enemies alike.

At the state level, from 1957 to 1989, the Country Party under Frank Nicklin and Joh Bjelke-Petersen dominated governments in Queensland—for the last six of those years ruling in its own right, without the Liberals. This was due to the bjelkemander, a malapportionment in electorates which gave rural voters twice the voting power compared to voters within the city. It also took part in governments in New South Wales, Victoria, and Western Australia.

However, successive electoral redistributions after 1964 indicated that the Country Party was losing ground electorally to the Liberals as the rural population declined, and the nature of some parliamentary seats on the urban and rural fringe changed. A proposed merger with the Democratic Labor Party (DLP) under the banner of "National Alliance" was rejected when it failed to find favour with voters at the 1974 state election.

Also in 1974, the Northern Territory members of the party joined with its Liberal party members to form the independent Country Liberal Party. This party continues to represent both parent parties in that territory. A separate party, the Joh-inspired NT Nationals, competed in the 1987 election with former chief minister Ian Tuxworth retaining his seat of Barkly by a small margin. However, this splinter group was not endorsed by the national executive and soon disappeared from the political scene.

=== National Country Party and National Party ===
The National Party was confronted by the impact of demographic shifts from the 1970s: between 1971 and 1996, the population of Sydney and surrounds grew by 34%, with even larger growth in coastal New South Wales, while more remote rural areas grew by a mere 13%, further diminishing the National Party's base. At the federal convention held on 2 May 1975 in Canberra, the Country Party changed its name to the National Country Party of Australia as part of a strategy to expand into urban areas. This had some success in Queensland under Joh Bjelke-Petersen, but nowhere else. The party briefly walked out of the coalition agreement in Western Australia in May 1975, returning within the month. However, the party split in two over the decision and other factors in late 1978, with a new National Party forming and becoming independent, holding three seats in the Western Australian lower house, while the National Country Party remained in coalition and also held three seats. They reconciled after the Burke Labor government came to power in 1983.

The 1980s were dominated by the feud between Bjelke-Petersen and the federal party leadership under Ian Sinclair. Bjelke-Petersen briefly triumphed in 1987, forcing the Nationals to tear up the Coalition agreement and support his bid to become prime minister. The "Joh for Canberra" campaign backfired spectacularly when a large number of three-cornered contests allowed Labor to win a third term under Bob Hawke; however, in 1987 the National Party won a bump in votes and recorded its highest vote in more than four decades, but it also recorded a new low in the proportion of seats won. The collapse of the Joh for Canberra campaign also proved to be the Queensland Nationals' last hurrah; Bjelke-Petersen was forced into retirement a few months after the federal election, and his party was heavily defeated in 1989. The federal National Party were badly defeated at the 1990 election, losing five seats including that of leader Charles Blunt, who had ousted Sinclair months earlier.

Blunt's successor as leader, Tim Fischer, recovered two seats at the 1993 election, but lost an additional 1.2% of the vote from its 1990 result. In 1996, as the Coalition won a significant victory over Paul Keating's Labor government, the National Party recovered another two seats, and Fischer became deputy prime minister under John Howard.

The Nationals experienced difficulties in the late 1990s from two fronts – firstly from the Liberal Party, who were winning seats on the basis that the Nationals were not seen to be a sufficiently separate party, and from the One Nation Party riding a swell of rural discontent with many of the policies such as multiculturalism and gun control embraced by all of the major parties. The rise of Labor in formerly safe National-held areas in rural Queensland, particularly on the coast, has been the biggest threat to the Queensland Nationals.

At the 1998 Federal election, the National Party recorded only 5.3% of the vote in the House of Representatives, its lowest ever, and won only 16 seats, at 10.8% its second lowest proportion of seats.

The National Party under Fischer and his successor, John Anderson, rarely engaged in public disagreements with the Liberal Party, which weakened the party's ability to present a separate image to rural and regional Australia. In 2001 the National Party recorded its second-worst result at 5.6% winning 13 seats, and its third lowest at 5.9% at the 2004 election, winning only 12 seats.

Australian psephologist Antony Green argues that two important trends have driven the National Party's decline at a federal level: "the importance of the rural sector to the health of the nation's economy" and "the growing chasm between the values and attitudes of rural and urban Australia". Green has suggested that the result has been that "Both have resulted in rural and regional voters demanding more of the National Party, at exactly the time when its political influence has declined. While the National Party has never been the sole representative of rural Australia, it is the only party that has attempted to paint itself as representing rural voters above all else".

In June 2005, party leader John Anderson announced that he would resign from the ministry and as leader of the Nationals due to a benign prostate condition, he was succeeded by Mark Vaile. At the following 2007 election, the Nationals vote declined further, with the party winning a mere 5.4% of the vote and securing only 10 seats. Vaile announced his resignation as party leader which surprised his colleagues, as he had been expected to be re-elected unopposed following the election. He had planned the party leadership to go to Peter McGauran but the latter declined to stand. Warren Truss and Nigel Scullion were then elected unopposed as leader and deputy leader.

In 2010, under the leadership of Truss, the party received its lowest vote to date, at only 3.4%, however they secured a slight increase in seats from 10 to 12. At the following election in 2010 the national Party's fortunes improved slightly with a vote of 4.2% and an increase in seats from 12 to 15.

At the 2016 double dissolution election, under the leadership of Barnaby Joyce the party secured 4.6% of the vote and 16 seats. In 2018, reports emerged that the National Party leader and deputy prime minister, Barnaby Joyce was expecting a child with his former communications staffer Vikki Campion. Joyce resigned after revelations that he had been engaged in an extramarital affair. Later in the same year it was revealed that the NSW National party and its youth wing, the Young Nationals had been infiltrated by neo-Nazis with more than 30 members being investigated for alleged links to neo-Nazism. Leader Michael McCormack denounced the infiltration, and several suspected neo-Nazis were expelled from the party and its youth wing.

At the 2019 Australian federal election, despite severe drought, perceived inaction over the plight of the Murray–Darling basin, a poor performance in the New South Wales state election and sex scandals surrounding the member for Mallee, Andrew Broad and former party leader Barnaby Joyce, the National Party saw only a small decline in vote, down 0.10% to attain 4.51% of the primary vote.

Following the 2025 federal election, In May 2025 the Nationals decided not to sign a new Coalition agreement with the Liberals. This resulted in the two parties operating separately for the first time since the 1980s, and thus reducing the Nationals to third party status in the Australian Parliament, sitting on the crossbench. The split lasted only eight days, following agreement on several policy areas that the Nationals had advocated, and a new shadow ministry was revealed. In January 2026, The Nationals again quit the Coalition. The two parties reunified again on 8 February 2026.

== State and territory parties ==
The official state and territorial party organisations (or equivalents) of the National Party are:

Party	Leader	Last election					Status	Federal representatives	
Party	Leader	Lower House			Upper House		Status	MPs	Senators
Party	Leader	Year	Votes (%)	Seats	votes (%)	Seats	Status	MPs	Senators
Queensland (Note: The Liberal National Party of Queensland (LNP) is the result of a merger of the Queensland Liberal Party and the Queensland National Party to contest elections as a single party. It is officially a division of the federal Liberal Party, affiliated with The National Party.)	David Crisafulli	2024	41.5	52 / 93	—N/a (Note: Queensland no longer has an upper house, it voted to dissolve its Legislative Council in 1922)		Majority	5 / 30	2 / 12
Northern Territory (Note: The Country Liberal Party is an associate of both the Liberal and National parties on a federal level.)	Lia Finocchiaro	2024	48.9	17 / 25	—N/a (Note: The NT has a Unicameral parliament)		Majority	0 / 2	0 / 2
New South Wales	Gurmesh Singh	2023	8.6	11 / 93	29.8 (Note: Liberal/National joint ticket total shown)	5 / 42	Liberal–National Coalition opposition	6 / 47	1 / 12
Victoria	Danny O'Brien	2022	4.7	9 / 88	29.4 (Note: Liberal/National joint ticket total shown)	3 / 40	Liberal–National Coalition opposition	3 / 39	1 / 12
Western Australia	Shane Love	2025	4.1	6 / 59	2.8	2 / 36	Liberal–National opposition alliance	0 / 15	0 / 12
South Australia		2022	0.4	0 / 47	0.7	0 / 22	Extra-parliamentary	0 / 10	0 / 12
Tasmania		2025	1.7	0 / 35	—N/a (Note: Tasmania elects legislative council representatives on a periodic basis, with elections held almost every year)	0 / 15	Extra-parliamentary	0 / 5	0 / 12

== Political role ==
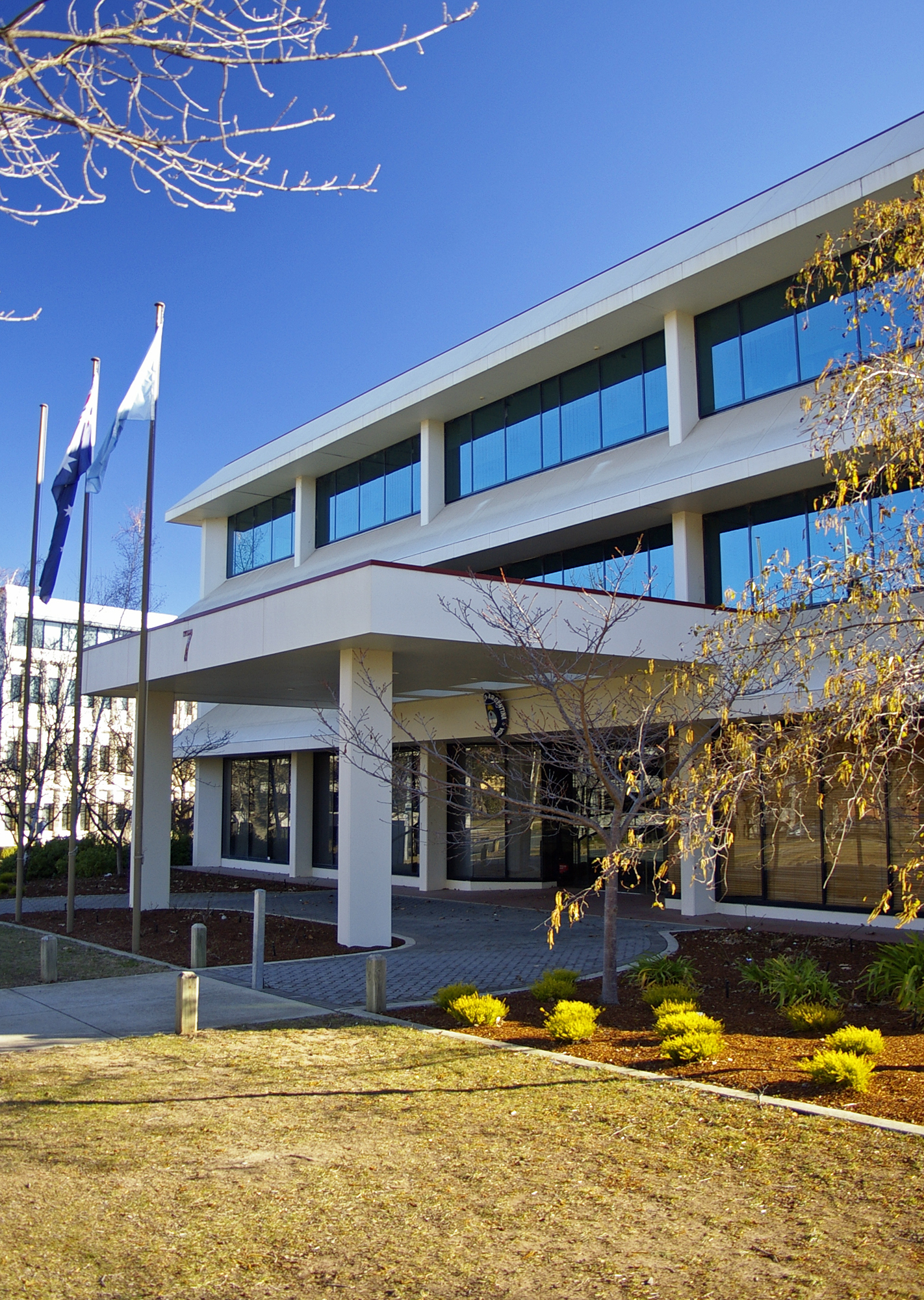
John McEwen House, The National Party's headquarters in Canberra

The Nationals see their main role as giving a voice to Australians who live outside the country's metropolitan areas.

Traditionally, the leader of the National Party serves as Deputy Prime Minister when there is a coalition agreement with the Liberal Party, and the two form Government. This tradition dates back to the creation of the office in 1968.

The National Party's support base and membership are closely associated with the agricultural community. Historically anti-union, the party has vacillated between state support for primary industries ("agrarian socialism") and free agricultural trade and has opposed tariff protection for Australia's manufacturing and service industries. It is usually in favor of industrial development, opposing green politics.

"Countrymindedness" was a slogan that summed up the ideology of the Country Party from 1920 through the early 1970s. It was an ideology that was physiocratic, populist, and decentralist; it fostered rural solidarity and justified demands for government subsidies. "Countrymindedness" grew out of the failure of the country areas to participate in the rapid economic and population expansions that occurred after 1890. The growth of the ideology into urban areas came as most country people migrated to jobs in the cities. Its decline was due mainly to the reduction of real and psychological differences between country and city brought about by the postwar expansion of the Australian urban population and to the increased affluence and technological changes that accompanied it.

The Nationals vote is in decline and its traditional supporters are turning instead to prominent independents such as Bob Katter, Tony Windsor and Peter Andren in Federal Parliament and similar independents in the Parliaments of New South Wales, Queensland and Victoria, many of whom are former members of the National Party. In fact since the 2004 Federal election, National Party candidates have received fewer first preference votes than the Australian Greens.

Demographic changes are not helping, with fewer people living and employed on the land or in small towns, the continued growth of the larger provincial centres, and, in some cases, the arrival of left-leaning "city refugees" in rural areas. The Liberals have also gained support as the differences between the coalition partners on a federal level have become invisible. This was highlighted in January 2006, when Nationals Senator Julian McGauran defected to the Liberals, saying that there was "no longer any real distinguishing policy or philosophical difference".

In Queensland, Nationals leader Lawrence Springborg advocated merger of the National and Liberal parties at a state level in order to present a more effective opposition to the Labor Party. Previously this plan had been dismissed by the Queensland branch of the Liberal party, but the idea received in-principle support from the Liberals. Federal leader Mark Vaile stated the Nationals will not merge with the Liberal Party at a federal level. The plan was opposed by key Queensland Senators Ron Boswell and Barnaby Joyce, and was scuttled in 2006. After suffering defeat in the 2006 Queensland poll, Lawrence Springborg was replaced by Jeff Seeney, who indicated he was not interested in merging with the Liberal Party until the issue is seriously raised at a Federal level.

In September 2008, Joyce replaced CLP Senator and Nationals deputy leader Nigel Scullion as leader of the Nationals in the Senate, and stated that his party in the upper house would no longer necessarily vote with their Liberal counterparts in the upper house, which opened up another possible avenue for the Rudd Labor government to get legislation through. Joyce was elected leader in a party-room ballot on 11 February 2016, following the retirement of former leader and Deputy Prime Minister Warren Truss. Joyce was one of five politicians disqualified from parliament in October 2017 for holding dual citizenship, along with former deputy leader, Fiona Nash.

The 1987 Australian federal election was the last time the National party received over 10% of the vote and the 2007 Australian federal election was the last time the National party received over 5% of the vote for the House of Representatives.

== Queensland Liberal/National merger ==
Merger plans came to a head in May 2008, when the Queensland state Liberal Party gave an announcement not to wait for a federal blueprint but instead to merge immediately. The new party, the Liberal National Party, was founded in July 2008.

== Electoral performance ==
=== House of Representatives ===
Election	Leader	Votes	%	Seats	+/–	Position	Status
1919	None	176,884	8.7	11 / 75	▲11	▲3rd	Crossbench
1922	Earle Page	197,513	12.5	14 / 75	▲3	3rd	Coalition
1925	Earle Page	313,363	10.7	13 / 75	▼1	3rd	Coalition
1928	Earle Page	271,686	10.4	13 / 75	Steady	3rd	Coalition
1929	Earle Page	295,640	10.2	10 / 75	▼3	3rd	Opposition
1931	Earle Page	388,544	12.2	16 / 75	▲6	▲2nd	Crossbench
1934	Earle Page	447,968	12.6	14 / 74	▼2	▼3rd	Coalition
1937	Earle Page	560,279	15.5	16 / 74	▲2	3rd	Coalition
1940	Archie Cameron	531,397	13.7	13 / 74	▼3	3rd	Coalition
1943	Arthur Fadden	287,000	6.9	7 / 74	▼6	3rd	Opposition
1946	Arthur Fadden	464,737	10.7	11 / 76	▲4	3rd	Opposition
1949	Arthur Fadden	500,349	10.8	19 / 121	▲8	3rd	Coalition
1951	Arthur Fadden	443,713	9.7	17 / 121	▼2	3rd	Coalition
1954	Arthur Fadden	388,171	8.5	17 / 121	Steady	3rd	Coalition
1955	Arthur Fadden	347,445	7.9	18 / 122	▲1	3rd	Coalition
1958	John McEwen	465,320	9.3	19 / 122	▲1	3rd	Coalition
1961	John McEwen	446,475	8.5	17 / 122	▼2	3rd	Coalition
1963	John McEwen	489,498	8.9	20 / 122	▲3	3rd	Coalition
1966	John McEwen	561,926	9.8	21 / 124	▲1	3rd	Coalition
1969	John McEwen	523,232	8.5	20 / 125	▼1	3rd	Coalition
1972	Doug Anthony	622,826	9.4	20 / 125	Steady	3rd	Opposition
1974	Doug Anthony	736,252	9.9	21 / 127	▲1	3rd	Opposition
1975	Doug Anthony	869,919	11.2	23 / 127	▲2	3rd	Coalition
1977	Doug Anthony	793,444	10.0	19 / 124	▼4	3rd	Coalition
1980	Doug Anthony	745,037	8.9	20 / 125	▲1	3rd	Coalition
1983	Doug Anthony	799,609	9.2	17 / 125	▼3	3rd	Opposition
1984	Ian Sinclair	921,151	10.6	21 / 148	▲4	3rd	Opposition
1987	Ian Sinclair	1,060,976	11.5	19 / 148	▼2	3rd	Opposition
1990	Charles Blunt	833,557	8.4	14 / 148	▼5	3rd	Opposition
1993	Tim Fischer	758,036	7.1	16 / 147	▲2	3rd	Opposition
1996	Tim Fischer	893,170	7.1	18 / 148	▲2	3rd	Coalition
1998	Tim Fischer	588,088	5.2	16 / 148	▼2	3rd	Coalition
2001	John Anderson	643,926	5.6	13 / 150	▼3	3rd	Coalition
2004	John Anderson	690,275	5.8	12 / 150	▼1	3rd	Coalition
2007	Mark Vaile	682,424	5.4	10 / 150	▼2	3rd	Opposition
2010	Warren Truss	419,286	3.4	12 / 150 (Note: Including the 5 LNP MPs who sit in the National party room.)	▲2	3rd	Opposition
2013	Warren Truss	554,268	4.2	15 / 150	▲3	3rd	Coalition
2016	Barnaby Joyce	624,555	4.6	16 / 150	▲1	3rd	Coalition
2019	Michael McCormack	642,233	4.5	16 / 151	Steady	3rd	Coalition
2022	Barnaby Joyce	528,442	3.6	16 / 151	Steady	3rd	Opposition
2025	David Littleproud	588,778	3.8	15 / 150	▼1	3rd	Opposition

=== Results timeline ===
Year	(Australia) AU	(Australian Capital Territory) ACT	(New South Wales) NSW	(Northern Territory) NT	(Queensland) Qld	(South Australia) SA	(Tasmania) Tas	(Victoria (state)) Vic	(Western Australia) WA
1914	N/A	N/A	N/A	N/A	N/A	N/A	N/A	N/A	14.0
1915	N/A	N/A	N/A	N/A	5.1	N/A	N/A	N/A	14.0
1916	N/A	N/A	N/A	N/A	5.1	N/A	N/A	N/A	14.0
1917	N/A	N/A	N/A	N/A	5.1	N/A	N/A	6.1	▲18.5
1918	N/A	N/A	N/A	N/A	N/A	4.3	N/A	6.1	
1919	8.7	N/A	N/A	N/A	N/A	4.3	N/A	6.1	
1920	8.7	N/A	N/A	N/A	17.1	4.3	N/A	▲14.4	
1921	8.7	N/A	N/A	N/A	17.1	▼4.1	N/A	▼14.0	▼17.8
1922	▲12.5	N/A	N/A	N/A	17.1	▼4.1	14.0	▼14.0	
1923		N/A	N/A	N/A	▼10.8	▼4.1		▼14.0	
1924		N/A	N/A	N/A	▼10.8	▲8.9		▼12.0	▲24.9
1925	▼10.7	N/A	N/A	N/A	▼10.8	▲8.9	N/A		▲24.9
1926		N/A	N/A	N/A	▲48.5	▲8.9	N/A		▲24.9
1927		N/A	▼8.9	N/A	▲48.5	▼5.4	N/A	▼8.1	▼16.0
1928	▼10.4	N/A		N/A	▲48.5		N/A	▼8.1	▼16.0
1929	▼10.2	N/A		N/A	▲54.3		N/A	▲8.8	▼16.0
1930	▼10.2	N/A	▲9.6	N/A		▲6.9	N/A	▲8.8	▲18.8
1931	▲12.2	N/A	▲9.6	N/A		▲6.9	N/A	▲8.8	
1932	▲12.2	N/A	▲13.2	N/A	▼45.2	▲6.9	N/A	▲12.3	
1933	▲12.2	N/A		N/A	▼45.2	N/A	N/A		▼14.3
1934	▲12.6	N/A		N/A	▼45.2	N/A	N/A		▼14.3
1935		N/A	▼12.9	N/A	▼33.8	N/A	N/A	▲13.7	▼14.3
1936		N/A		N/A	▼33.8	N/A	N/A		▲14.6
1937	▲15.5	N/A		N/A	▼33.8	N/A	N/A	▼11.4	▲14.6
1938		N/A	▲13.9	N/A	▼24.6	N/A	N/A		▲14.6
1939		N/A		N/A	▼24.6	N/A	N/A		▼12.0
1940	▼13.7	N/A		N/A	▼24.6	N/A	N/A	▲14.1	▼12.0
1941		N/A	▼11.1	N/A	▼20.2	N/A	N/A		▼12.0
1942		N/A	▼11.1	N/A	▼20.2	N/A	N/A		▼12.0
1943	▼6.9	N/A	▼11.1	N/A	▼20.2	N/A	N/A	▲14.3	▲12.4
1944	▼6.9	N/A	▼10.4	N/A	▼17.3	N/A	N/A		▲12.4
1945	▼6.9	N/A	▼10.4	N/A	▼17.3	N/A	N/A	▲18.7	▲12.4
1946	▲10.7	N/A	▼10.4	N/A	▼17.3	N/A	N/A	▲18.7	▲12.4
1947	▲10.7	N/A	▼10.2	N/A	▲20.2	N/A	N/A	▼14.9	▲16.2
1948	▲10.7	N/A	▼10.2	N/A	▲20.2	N/A	N/A		
1949	▲10.8	N/A	▼10.2	N/A	▲20.2	N/A	N/A		
1950		N/A	▼9.0	N/A	▼19.3	N/A	N/A	▼10.6	▼9.3
1951	▼9.7	N/A	▼9.0	N/A	▼19.3	N/A	N/A		
1952		N/A	▼9.0	N/A	▼19.3	N/A	N/A	▼8.3	
1953		N/A	▲11.6	N/A	▼18.7	N/A	N/A	▼8.3	▼4.9
1954	▼8.5	N/A	▲11.6	N/A	▼18.7	N/A	N/A	▼8.3	▼4.9
1955	▼7.9	N/A	▲11.6	N/A	▼18.7	N/A	N/A	▲9.5	▼4.9
1956		N/A	▼10.2	N/A	▲19.3	N/A	N/A	▲9.5	▲5.2
1957		N/A	▼10.2	N/A	▲20.0	N/A	N/A	▲9.5	▲5.2
1958	▲9.3	N/A	▼10.2	N/A		N/A	N/A	▼9.3	▲5.2
1959		N/A	▼8.7	N/A		N/A	N/A	▼9.3	▲6.6
1960		N/A	▼8.7	N/A	▼19.5	N/A	N/A	▼9.3	
1961	▼8.5	N/A	▼8.7	N/A		N/A	N/A	▼7.1	
1962		N/A	▲9.4	N/A		N/A	N/A	▼7.1	▼5.9
1963	▲8.9	N/A	▲9.4	N/A	▲20.3	N/A	N/A	▼7.1	
1964		N/A	▲9.4	N/A		N/A	5.3	▲8.8	
1965		N/A	▲10.2	N/A		0.5	5.3	▲8.8	▼4.9
1966	▲9.8	N/A		N/A	▼19.3	0.5	5.3	▲8.8	
1967		N/A		N/A		0.5	5.3	▼8.7	
1968		N/A	▲10.6	N/A		▼0.4	5.3	▼8.7	▲5.3
1969	▼8.5	N/A		N/A	▲21.0	▼0.4	▼4.3	▼8.7	
1970		N/A		N/A		▲1.9		▼6.4	
1971		N/A	▼8.7	N/A		▲1.9		▼6.4	▲5.6
1972	▼9.4	N/A		N/A	▼20.0	▲1.9	N/A	▼6.4	▲5.6
1973	▼9.4	N/A	▲10.5	N/A		▲3.9	N/A	▼6.0	▲5.6
1974	▲9.9	N/A		49.0	▲27.9	▲3.9	N/A	▼6.0	▲10.8
1975	▲11.2	N/A				▼2.8	N/A	▼6.0	
1976		N/A	▼10.0			▼2.8	N/A	▲7.1	
1977	▼10.0	N/A	▼10.0	▼40.1	▼27.1	▼1.6	N/A	▲7.1	▼5.3
1978		N/A	▼9.9			▼1.6	N/A	▲7.1	
1979		N/A	▼9.9			▲1.9	N/A	▼5.6	
1980	▼8.9	N/A	▼9.9	▲50.0	▲27.9	▲1.9	N/A	▼5.6	▲7.3
1981		N/A	▲11.2			▲1.9	N/A	▼5.6	
1982		N/A	▲11.2			▲2.3	N/A	▼5.0	
1983	▲9.2	N/A	▲11.2	▲58.2	▲38.9	▲2.3	N/A	▼5.0	▼5.1
1984	▲10.6	N/A	▼8.9			▲2.3	N/A	▼5.0	▼5.1
1985	▲10.6	N/A	▼8.9			▼1.7	N/A	▲7.3	▼5.1
1986	▲10.6	N/A	▼8.9		▲39.6	▼1.7	N/A	▲7.3	▼3.7
1987	▲11.5	N/A	▼8.9	▼39.4		▼1.7	N/A	▲7.3	▼3.7
1988	▲11.5	N/A	▲13.7			▼1.7	N/A	▲7.8	▼3.7
1989	▲11.5	N/A			▼24.1	▼1.2	N/A	▲7.8	▲4.6
1990	▼8.4	N/A		▲48.8	▼24.1	▼1.2	N/A	▲7.8	▲4.6
1991	▼8.4	N/A	▼10.5		▼24.1	▼1.2	N/A	▲7.8	▲4.6
1992	▼8.4	N/A			▼23.7	▼1.2	N/A	▲7.8	▲4.6
1993	▼7.2	N/A			▼23.7	▼1.1	N/A		▲5.3
1994	▼7.2	N/A		▲51.9	▼23.7	▼1.1	N/A		
1995	▼7.2	N/A	▲11.1		▲26.3	▼1.1	N/A		
1996	▲8.2	N/A	▲11.1		▲26.3	▼1.1	2.2	▼6.7	▲5.8
1997		N/A	▲11.1	▲54.7	▲26.3	▲1.7	2.2		
1998	▼5.3	N/A	▲11.1		▼15.2	▲1.7	N/A		
1999		N/A	▼8.9		▼15.2	▲1.7	N/A	▼4.8	
2000		N/A	▼8.9		▼15.2	▲1.7	N/A	▼4.8	
2001	▲5.6	N/A	▼8.9	▼45.4	▼14.2	▲1.7	N/A	▼4.8	▼3.3
2002		N/A	▼8.9	▼45.4	▼14.2	▼1.5	N/A	▼4.3	▼3.3
2003		N/A	▲9.6	▼45.4	▼14.2	▼1.5	N/A	▼4.3	▼3.3
2004	▲5.9	N/A	▲9.6	▼45.4	▲17.0	▼1.5	N/A	▼4.3	▼3.3
2005		N/A	▲9.6	▼25.7	▲17.0	▼1.5	N/A	▼4.3	▲3.7
2006		N/A	▲9.6	▼25.7	▲17.8	▲2.1	N/A	▲5.2	▲3.7
2007	▼5.5	N/A	▲10.1	▼25.7	▲17.8		N/A	▲5.2	▲3.7
2008	▼5.5	N/A	▲10.1	▲45.4	▲17.8		N/A	▲5.2	▲4.9
2009	▼5.5	N/A	▲10.1	▲45.4	▼41.6		N/A	▲5.2	
2010	▼3.4	N/A	▲10.1	▲45.4	▼41.6	▼1.1	N/A	▲6.8	
2011	▼3.4	N/A	▲12.6	▲45.4	▼41.6	▼1.1	N/A		
2012	▼3.4	N/A		▲50.6	▲49.6	▼1.1	N/A		
2013	▲4.3	N/A				▼1.1	N/A		▲6.1
2014		N/A				▼0.1	0.8	▼5.5	
2015		N/A	▼10.6		▼41.3	▼0.1	0.8	▼5.5	
2016	▼4.6	N/A		▼31.8	▼41.3	▼0.1	0.8	▼5.5	
2017		N/A		▼31.8	▼33.7	▼0.1	0.8	▼5.5	▼5.4
2018		N/A		▼31.8	▼33.7	N/A	N/A	▼4.8	▼5.4
2019	▼4.5	N/A	▼9.6	▼31.8	▼33.7	N/A	N/A	▼4.8	▼5.4
2020		N/A		▼31.3	▲35.9	N/A	N/A	▼4.8	▼5.4
2021		N/A		▼31.3	▲35.9	N/A	N/A	▼4.8	▼4.0
2022	▼3.6	N/A		▼31.3	▲35.9	0.5	N/A	▼4.8	▼4.0
2023	▼3.6	N/A	▼8.6	▼31.3	▲35.9	0.5	N/A	▼4.8	▼4.0
2024	▼3.6	N/A	▼8.6	▲49.2	▲41.6	0.5	N/A	▼4.8	▼4.0
2025	▲3.8	N/A	▼8.6			0.5	1.6	▼4.8	▲5.4
2026	▲3.8	N/A	▼8.6			▼0.1	1.6	—N/a (Note: The 2026 Victorian state election will be held on 28 November 2026)	▲5.4
Year	(Australia) AU	(Australian Capital Territory) ACT	(New South Wales) NSW	(Northern Territory) NT	(Queensland) Qld	(South Australia) SA	(Tasmania) Tas	(Victoria (state)) Vic	(Western Australia) WA
**Bold** indicates best result to date. Present in legislature (in opposition) Coalition partner

== Leadership ==
The leader of the National Party of Australia (formerly the Australian Country Party and National Country Party) is elected by majority vote of the federal parliamentary party. A deputy leader is elected in the same fashion.

The party's longest-serving leader is Earle Page, who held the office from 1921 to 1939. It is historically rare for the incumbent leader and deputy leader to be opposed in a bid for re-election.

The party's current leader is Matt Canavan, who has held the position since 11 March 2026.

=== List of leaders ===
#	Leader	Portrait	Electorate	Took office	Left office	Prime Minister (term)
1		William McWilliams	Franklin, Tas.	24 February 1920	5 April 1921	Hughes 1917–1923
2		Earle Page	Cowper, NSW	5 April 1921	13 September 1939	Hughes 1917–1923
2		Earle Page	Cowper, NSW	5 April 1921	13 September 1939	Bruce 1923–1929
2		Earle Page	Cowper, NSW	5 April 1921	13 September 1939	Scullin 1929–1932
2		Earle Page	Cowper, NSW	5 April 1921	13 September 1939	Lyons 1932–1939
2		Earle Page	Cowper, NSW	5 April 1921	13 September 1939	Himself 1939
2		Earle Page	Cowper, NSW	5 April 1921	13 September 1939	Menzies 1939–1941
3		Archie Cameron	Barker, SA	13 September 1939	16 October 1940	Menzies 1939–1941
4		Arthur Fadden	Darling Downs, Qld. McPherson, Qld.	16 October 1940 acting until 12 March 1941	12 March 1958	Menzies 1939–1941
4		Arthur Fadden	Darling Downs, Qld. McPherson, Qld.	16 October 1940 acting until 12 March 1941	12 March 1958	Himself 1941
4		Arthur Fadden	Darling Downs, Qld. McPherson, Qld.	16 October 1940 acting until 12 March 1941	12 March 1958	Curtin 1941–1945
4		Arthur Fadden	Darling Downs, Qld. McPherson, Qld.	16 October 1940 acting until 12 March 1941	12 March 1958	Forde 1945
4		Arthur Fadden	Darling Downs, Qld. McPherson, Qld.	16 October 1940 acting until 12 March 1941	12 March 1958	Chifley 1941–1945
4		Arthur Fadden	Darling Downs, Qld. McPherson, Qld.	16 October 1940 acting until 12 March 1941	12 March 1958	Menzies 1949–1966
5		John McEwen	Murray, Vic.	26 March 1958	1 February 1971	Menzies 1949–1966
5		John McEwen	Murray, Vic.	26 March 1958	1 February 1971	Holt 1966–1967
5		John McEwen	Murray, Vic.	26 March 1958	1 February 1971	Himself 1968
5		John McEwen	Murray, Vic.	26 March 1958	1 February 1971	Gorton 1968–1971
5		John McEwen	Murray, Vic.	26 March 1958	1 February 1971	McMahon 1971–1972
6		Doug Anthony	Richmond, NSW	2 February 1971	17 January 1984	McMahon 1971–1972
6		Doug Anthony	Richmond, NSW	2 February 1971	17 January 1984	Whitlam 1972–1975
6		Doug Anthony	Richmond, NSW	2 February 1971	17 January 1984	Fraser 1975–1983
6		Doug Anthony	Richmond, NSW	2 February 1971	17 January 1984	Hawke 1983–1991
7		Ian Sinclair	New England, NSW	17 January 1984	9 May 1989	Hawke 1983–1991
8		Charles Blunt	Richmond, NSW	9 May 1989	6 April 1990	Hawke 1983–1991
9		Tim Fischer	Farrer, NSW	19 April 1990	1 July 1999	Hawke 1983–1991
9		Tim Fischer	Farrer, NSW	19 April 1990	1 July 1999	Keating 1991–1996
9		Tim Fischer	Farrer, NSW	19 April 1990	1 July 1999	Howard 1996–2007
10		John Anderson	Gwydir, NSW	1 July 1999	23 June 2005	Howard 1996–2007
11		Mark Vaile	Lyne, NSW	23 June 2005	3 December 2007	Howard 1996–2007
12		Warren Truss	Wide Bay, Qld.	7 December 2007	11 February 2016	Rudd 2007–2010
12		Warren Truss	Wide Bay, Qld.	7 December 2007	11 February 2016	Gillard 2010–2013
12		Warren Truss	Wide Bay, Qld.	7 December 2007	11 February 2016	Rudd 2013
12		Warren Truss	Wide Bay, Qld.	7 December 2007	11 February 2016	Abbott 2013–2015
12		Warren Truss	Wide Bay, Qld.	7 December 2007	11 February 2016	Turnbull 2015–2018
13		Barnaby Joyce	New England, NSW	11 February 2016	26 February 2018	Turnbull 2015–2018
14		Michael McCormack	Riverina, NSW	26 February 2018	21 June 2021	Turnbull 2015–2018
14		Michael McCormack	Riverina, NSW	26 February 2018	21 June 2021	Morrison 2018–2022
(13)		Barnaby Joyce	New England, NSW	21 June 2021	30 May 2022	Morrison 2018–2022
(13)		Barnaby Joyce	New England, NSW	21 June 2021	30 May 2022	Albanese 2022–present
15		David Littleproud	Maranoa, Qld.	30 May 2022	10 March 2026	Albanese 2022–present
16		Matt Canavan	Senator for Queensland	11 March 2026	Incumbent	Albanese 2022–present

=== List of deputy leaders ===
Order	Name	State	Term start	Term end	Time in office	Leader
1	Edmund Jowett	Victoria	24 February 1920	5 April 1921	1 year, 40 days	McWilliams
2	Henry Gregory	Western Australia	5 April 1921	2 December 1921	241 days	Page
vacant			23 February 1922	27 June 1922		Page
3	William Fleming	New South Wales	27 June 1922	16 January 1923	203 days	Page
4	William Gibson	Victoria	16 January 1923	19 November 1929	6 years, 307 days	Page
5	Thomas Paterson	New South Wales	19 November 1929	27 November 1937	8 years, 8 days	Page
6	Harold Thorby				2 years, 262 days	Page
6	Harold Thorby	New South Wales	27 November 1937	15 October 1940	2 years, 262 days	Cameron
7	Arthur Fadden	Queensland	15 October 1940	12 March 1941	148 days	vacant
vacant			12 March 1941	22 September 1943		Fadden
8	John McEwen	Victoria	22 September 1943	26 March 1958	14 years, 185 days	Fadden
9	Charles Davidson	Queensland	26 March 1958	11 December 1963	5 years, 260 days	McEwen
10	Charles Adermann	Queensland	11 December 1963	8 December 1966	2 years, 362 days	McEwen
11	Doug Anthony	New South Wales	8 December 1966	2 February 1971	4 years, 56 days	McEwen
12	Ian Sinclair	New South Wales	2 February 1971	17 January 1984	12 years, 349 days	Anthony
13	Ralph Hunt	New South Wales	17 January 1984	24 July 1987	3 years, 188 days	Sinclair
14	Bruce Lloyd				5 years, 242 days	Sinclair
14	Bruce Lloyd	Victoria	24 July 1987	23 March 1993	5 years, 242 days	Blunt
14	Bruce Lloyd				5 years, 242 days	Fischer
15	John Anderson	New South Wales	23 March 1993	1 July 1999	6 years, 100 days	Fischer
16	Mark Vaile	New South Wales	1 July 1999	23 June 2005	5 years, 357 days	Anderson
17	Warren Truss	Queensland	23 June 2005	3 December 2007	2 years, 163 days	Vaile
18	Nigel Scullion	Northern Territory	3 December 2007	13 September 2013	5 years, 284 days	Truss
19	Barnaby Joyce	Queensland	13 September 2013	11 February 2016	2 years, 151 days	Truss
20	Fiona Nash	New South Wales	11 February 2016	7 December 2017	1 year, 299 days	Joyce
21	Bridget McKenzie		7 December 2017	2 February 2020		Joyce
21	Bridget McKenzie	Victoria	7 December 2017	2 February 2020	2 years, 57 days	McCormack
22	David Littleproud				2 years, 115 days	McCormack
22	David Littleproud	Queensland	4 February 2020	30 May 2022	2 years, 115 days	Joyce
23	Perin Davey	New South Wales	30 May 2022	12 May 2025	4 years, 172 days	Littleproud
24	Kevin Hogan	New South Wales	12 May 2025	11 March 2026	303 days	Littleproud
25	Darren Chester	Victoria	11 March 2026	Incumbent	252 days	Canavan

=== List of Senate leaders ===
The Country Party's first senators began their terms in 1926, but the party had no official leader in the upper chamber until 1935. Instead, the party nominated a "representative" or "liaison officer" where necessary – usually William Carroll. This was so that its members "were first and foremost representatives of their states, able to enjoy complete freedom of action and speech in the Senate and not beholden to the dictates of [...] a party Senate leader". On 3 October 1935, Charles Hardy was elected as Carroll's replacement and began using the title "Leader of the Country Party in the Senate". This usage was disputed by Carroll and Bertie Johnston, but a subsequent party meeting on 10 October confirmed Hardy's position. However, after Hardy's term ended in 1938 (due to his defeat at the 1937 election), the party did not elect another Senate leader until 1949 – apparently due to its small number of senators.

Unlike the leader in the House of Representatives, the Senate leader has not always been a member of the ministry or shadow ministry at all times.

#	Name	State	Term start	Term end	Time in office	Deputy
1	Charles Hardy	New South Wales	10 October 1935	30 June 1938	2 years, 263 days	
vacant			30 June 1938	1949		
2	Walter Cooper	Queensland	1949	1960		
3	Harrie Wade	Victoria	1961	1964		
4	Colin McKellar	New South Wales	1964	1969		
5	Tom Drake-Brockman	Western Australia	1969	1975		
6	James Webster	Victoria	1976	1980		
7	Douglas Scott	New South Wales	February 1980	30 June 1985		
8	Stan Collard	Queensland	1 July 1985	5 June 1987	1 year, 339 days	
9	John Stone	Queensland	21 August 1987	1 March 1990	2 years, 192 days	
10	Ron Boswell	Queensland	10 April 1990	3 December 2007	17 years, 237 days	Sandy Macdonald
11	Nigel Scullion	Northern Territory	3 December 2007	17 September 2008	289 days	Ron Boswell
12	Barnaby Joyce	Queensland	17 September 2008	8 August 2013	4 years, 325 days	Fiona Nash
(11)	Nigel Scullion	Northern Territory	8 August 2013	28 May 2019	5 years, 293 days	Fiona Nash
13	Bridget McKenzie	Victoria	28 May 2019	Incumbent	7 years, 174 days	Matt Canavan Susan McDonald

== Past heads of government and opposition leaders ==
=== Federal ===
Name	Role	Term
Earle Page	Prime Minister	7 April 1939 – 26 April 1939
Arthur Fadden	Prime Minister	29 August 1941 – 7 October 1941
Arthur Fadden	Leader of the Opposition	7 October 1941 – 23 September 1943
John McEwen	Prime Minister	19 December 1967 – 10 January 1968

=== Queensland ===
Name	Role	Term
William Vowles	Leader of the Opposition	28 July 1920 – 11 July 1923
Arthur Moore	Leader of the Opposition	19 April 1924 – 12 May 1925
Arthur Moore	Leader of the Opposition	7 April 1936 – 15 July 1936
Ted Maher	Leader of the Opposition	15 July 1936 – 21 May 1941
Frank Nicklin	Leader of the Opposition	21 May 1941 – 12 August 1957
Frank Nicklin	Premier	12 August 1957 – 17 January 1968
Jack Pizzey	Premier	17 January 1968 – 31 July 1968
Joh Bjelke-Petersen	Premier	8 August 1968 – 1 December 1987
Mike Ahern	Premier	1 December 1987 – 25 September 1989
Russell Cooper	Premier	25 September 1989 – 7 December 1989
Russell Cooper	Leader of the Opposition	7 December 1989 – 9 December 1991
Rob Borbidge	Leader of the Opposition	10 December 1991 – 19 February 1996
Rob Borbidge	Premier	19 February 1996 – 20 June 1998
Rob Borbidge	Leader of the Opposition	20 June 1998 – 2 March 2001
Mike Horan	Leader of the Opposition	2 March 2001 – 4 February 2003
Lawrence Springborg	Leader of the Opposition	4 February 2003 – 18 September 2006
Jeff Seeney	Leader of the Opposition	18 September 2006 – 29 January 2008
Lawrence Springborg	Leader of the Opposition	29 January 2008 – 26 July 2008

=== Victoria ===
Name	Role	Term
John Allan	Premier	18 November 1924 – 20 May 1927
Albert Dunstan	Premier	2 April 1935 – 14 September 1943
Albert Dunstan	Leader of the Opposition	14 September 1943 – 18 September 1943
Albert Dunstan	Premier	18 September 1943 – 2 October 1945
John McDonald	Leader of the Opposition	21 November 1945 – 20 November 1947
John McDonald	Leader of the Opposition	7 December 1948 – 27 June 1950
John McDonald	Premier	27 June 1950 – 28 October 1952
John McDonald	Premier	31 October 1952 – 17 December 1952

=== Western Australia ===
Name	Role	Term
Charles Latham	Leader of the Opposition	24 April 1933 – 8 October 1942
Arthur Watts	Leader of the Opposition	8 October 1942 – 1 April 1947
Mia Davies	Leader of the Opposition	14 April 2021 – 30 January 2023
Shane Love	Leader of the Opposition	30 January 2023 – 25 March 2025

== Donors ==
For the 2015–2016 financial year, the top ten disclosed donors to the National Party were: Manildra Group ($182,000), Ognis Pty Ltd ($100,000), Trepang Services ($70,000), Northwake Pty Ltd ($65,000), Hancock Prospecting ($58,000), Bindaree Beef ($50,000), Mowburn Nominees ($50,000), Retail Guild of Australia ($48,000), CropLife International ($43,000) and Macquarie Group ($38,000).

The National Party also receives undisclosed funding through several methods, such as "associated entities". John McEwen House, Pilliwinks and Doogary are entities which have been used to funnel donations to the National Party without disclosing the source.

== See also ==
- Young Nationals (Australia)
- Leader of the New South Wales National Party
- Katter's Australian Party
- National Party of Australia leadership spill, 2007
