= Australian Wool Reserve Price Scheme =

Th Australian Wool Reserve Price Scheme (RPS) was a price floor scheme for wool that operated in Australia between 1970 and 1991. The scheme was set up by the Australian Wool Commission, created in November 1970, which was succeeded in January 1973 by the Australian Wool Corporation (AWC). The scheme was set up to smooth out fluctuations in prices for wool, of which Australia continues to be a major producer. The objective was for the AWC to buy wool when its price was below the floor price, which after 1987 was set by the Wool Council of Australia, and then sell it later when the market recovered. The scheme was funded by a levy on wool sold by growers. The Wool Council of Australia was established in 1979, and was the peak national body representing Australia's woolgrowers on wool industry issues and was responsible for the development and implementation of woolgrower policy. In July 2001, it was replaced by WoolProducers Australia.

== Origins and establishment ==
=== The wool auction system ===
Australia was said to 'ride on the sheep's back'. Large amounts of relatively inexpensive land, originally obtained by dispossession of Aboriginal peoples, selective breeding of Merino sheep, and a climate well suited to wool growing led to formation of a fine wool industry. As a commodity, Australian wool had been sold at auction since the 1840s. That auction system allowed overseas buyers to have certainty of the price and quality, prior to shipping the wool to their mills, but the wool price was exposed to market forces and to significant fluctuation over time. Wool that had not sold when auctioned, called 'the carry over', still belonged to the grower, and needed to be stored, until, hopefully it too was sold. The huge wool stores of the woolbroking firms were a feature of those Australian cities where auctions were held.

=== Reserve price scheme ===
Ideas about a reserve price scheme for wool go back, at the latest, to the later part of the Second World War. A large wool stockpile had accumulated during the war; wool production had boomed and enemy nations were no longer able to participate in the wool market. An arrangement called the Dominions-UK Wool Disposal Plan (also known as the 'Joint Organisation', or 'J.O.') was set up in 1945, specifically to dispose of the stockpile. As the stockpile decreased, woolgrowers began to advocate for a new 'Post-J.O.' scheme to market wool. However, the subsequent boom in wool prices, during the Korean War, appears to have put such plans on hold.

From 1951, William (Bill) Gunn (1914–2003) was a strong advocate for a scheme for stabilising the price of wool, using a reserve price scheme. Gunn became Chairman of the Australian Wool Board in 1963. He made no progress on the reserve price scheme, during the years of high wool prices. In 1965, a referendum of wool growers overwhelmingly rejected a reserve price scheme. However, Gunn continued to lobby for such a scheme.

In 1970, falling wool prices finally caused the government to adopt Gunn's reserve price scheme, but now as a means of saving the declining wool industry. Much of the text of the legislation to establish the scheme could be drawn from earlier work dating from two previous attempts to create such legislation, in 1951 and the updates made in 1964. The scheme would be operated by a new statutory authority, Australian Wool Commission, established in November 1970. It was independent of the Australian Wool Board, although its new chairman, William Vines, was a long term associate of Gunn, and Gunn and Vines had selected the seven board members. It began to buy wool on 16 November 1970. Selection of the undisclosed 'floating' floor price would be critical, as would the underlying demand for wool and the response of wool buyers.

== Operation ==
The scheme worked well until the mid-1980s, but eventually over-confidence set in, and the reserve level was raised too much. In 1987, the relevant Minister was removed from the reserve price setting process, and the floor price came to be set by the Wool Council, which set the floor price at a high 830 cents a kilogram. This encouraged wool producers to vastly increase production. Shortly after that decision the market collapsed. For various reasons, both the Chinese and the Russian mills all but stopped buying wool. The AWC kept buying the wool coming onto the auctions in Australia at the floor price. Before long, the AWC had exhausted its billion dollar plus reserves and started borrowing. Warehouses all over Australia were bursting with a massive and unsalable wool stockpile. But the AWC and the Council resolutely refused to consider any reduction in the floor price.

A key cause of the collapse of the scheme has been attributed to a change in the scheme's governance arrangements, whereby the Wool Council came to set the floor price, which led to increased political pressures to raise the guaranteed minimum floor price in 1974 to unsustainable levels. The minimum floor price gave artificial confidence to wool mills which saw little to no price risk and began purchasing forward and increasing stockpiles. At the same time farmers bred more sheep and produced more wool. The floor price had increased by 70% by 1991 and the AWC had built up a stockpile that would crash the industry.

=== Australian Wool Commission ===
The new Australian Wool Commission was to have a working capital of $115 million annually, expected to come from trading banks. Its operating costs, forecast to be $18.7 million, was to be borne jointly by wool growers, via a levy on wool sales, and the government. Doug Anthony stated that an objective of the new commission was to stabilise wool prices, not increase those prices above those determined by the market.

Vines told the press that he believed that the scheme would result in stable wool prices, and that there was no expectation that a large stockpile would form. However, by early 1971, wool prices had fallen—to real price levels not seen since 1931, during the Great Depression—and by the end of June 1971—the end of the wool selling season— the corporation held 440,000 wool bales, valued at around $40 million. Worse was to come, because rumours that the commission had run out of money caused buyers to abstain from the market, more or less completely, for fear of over-paying if the scheme were to collapse. The commission bought 90% of the lots offered in August 1971, and the wool ended up in a massive stockpile.

It is accepted economic theory, that a floor price has no effect when the market price is above the floor price, but results in a surplus of production when the floor price is above the prevailing market price. In essence, that is what happened, with a huge stockpile of Australian wool accumulating. The resultant surplus of supply then had the effect of depressing the market price further; buyers sensed that, eventually, either the reserve price scheme would collapse, releasing the surplus wool into the market as the huge stockpile was liquidated, or the floor price would be lowered.

The commission had effectively run out of money in late 1971. The Liberal Party tried to end the scheme, in a Cabinet meeting in October 1971, but their Country Party colleagues threatened to withdraw from the coalition, and got their way. The result was an additional $30 million of government-guaranteed loans to keep the commission in operation, and the stockpile grew to 931,000 bales in December 1971.

=== Australian Wool Corporation ===
In March 1972, the Australian Wool Board and Australian Wool Commission were amalgamated into a new organisation, the Australian Wool Corporation, which would be responsible for wool marketing and market intervention under the reserve price scheme. The McMahon government lost the December 1972 elections, and the incoming Whitlam government purged some members of the new corporation's board—those with strong connections to the former government—including Bill Gunn. The new organisation that emerged was intended to effectively compulsorily acquire around 90% of the wool clip and be responsible for marketing it.

The proposed approach of the new Australian Wool Corporation—its rejection of competitive market principles—led to immediate strong opposition by wool buyers and the World Trade Organisation. There was also opposition in Australia from those favouring free markets. The opposition led to the abandonment of the plans for compulsory acquisition, but the corporation still achieved much of what had been intended, by continued operation of the reserve price scheme.

In September 1974, the government introduced a change to the operation of the reserve price scheme; the floor price would no longer be 'floating' at the discretion of the corporation, but fixed annually at a low level so that it was triggered only by a temporary 'hole' in the price. This change further alienated buyers who had bought wool under the previous regime, and had been devalued by the change. Treasury began to put pressure on the Treasurer, Bill Hayden, to lower the floor price further and so reduce the potential liability. A proposal to do was overturned in Cabinet, by supporters of the corporation, including John Kerin and Bob Whan. The decision, to not adopt a lower floor price, in 1974, would only make the situation worse for the global wool trade.

Although Bill Gunn had by then departed from the Australian Wool Corporation, his influence lived on in the form of its new chairman, David Asimus. Asimus was a more polished individual than Gunn, but just as firm on intervention. The corporation took on the outward appearance of a successful trading organisation, and some aspects of the excesses that characterized some other debt-funded Australian businesses of the 1980s, including its own art collection. However, if the reserve price scheme of the Gunn era had the intention of stabilizing the price, the new management took a more aggressive approach, apparently aiming to actively manage an increase the price of wool over time.

Rather than decrease the floor price, as indicated by a large stockpile, the corporation lifted it between 1979 and 1981, to a level very close to the prevailing market price. Appreciation of the Australian dollar—the effect of a minerals boom—also impacted the price of wool to overseas buyers, effectively increasing it, in foreign currency value, by around 25%.

The election of the Hawke-Keating government in 1983, led to a radical and wide-ranging restructuring of the Australian economy, including the floating of the Australian dollar, leading to a 40% fall in its value. The floating exchange rate—with movements often being totally unrelated to wool market conditions—effectively undermined the corporation's objective of maintaining wool price stability, and made determination of a sound floor price a near impossibility. In 1985, the corporation wanted to increase the floor price, to compensate for the falling dollar, but then dumped 500,000 bales of wool into the market, depressing prices. Later it began extensive buying at the floor price. It exhibited what one author described, as "stunning commercial naivety", by denying supply to the market at reasonable prices, ending up buying 38% of the clip. It was rescued by growth in the world economy, which led to rising wool prices, in late 1986 and 1987, with a further increase in the floor price being made in April 1987.

=== The peak ===
It was in 1987, that responsibility for determining the floor price of wool was given to the Wool Council of Australia, an organisation representing wool growers. Later, it was a long term critic of the scheme, Jim Maple-Brown, who stated what became an essential flaw in the concept of the reserve price scheme, "the floor price is now determined by people with a vested interest in keeping the price of wool as high as possible".

1988 began well, wool prices were at a record high, well above the floor price, and the stockpile was down to 15,000 bales. Asimus retired in June 1988, to widespread acclaim, and was succeeded by Hugh Beggs. Wool production reached record levels; the sheep flock was at near-record levels and good seasons increased its productivity. Growers were secure that they would receive the appropriate floor price, and so growers did not receive any market signals that might have prevented gross over-production. Further, the reliable high prices resulted in more growers entering the industry; grain farmers suffering low grain prices and rich individuals with money to invest in sheep farms. between 1984 and 1991, wool production increased as a faster pace than at any time in the previous 100 years. Beggs made a public statement to the effect that the floor price would never be lowered.

The problems of the reserve price scheme were exacerbated by changes in the composition of wool buyers. Traditionally these had been European and Japanese buyers, who favoured high-quality wools and who had well-established relationships with wool brokers and auction houses. Increasingly, Chinese and Russian buyers seeking lower-priced wool entered the auction market, adding to the apparent level of demand. Rumours that Russian buyers lacked hard currency to fund purchases and forecasts that Chinese purchases would decline were ignored, as was the October 1987 stock market crash. The corporation increased the floor price again, in June 1988, to an all-time high of 870 cents per kilogram.

=== Final failure of the scheme ===
Ominously, after the Easter break in 1989, Japanese wool purchases fell by half and few Chinese buyers returned to the market. The Australian dollar was increasing in value, further affecting the market. Russian buyers withdrew from the wool market, with the Soviet Union entering its final political crisis.

Logically, the floor price needed to fall, but the corporation instead bought wool at the floor price, with the stockpile growing by 700,000 bales in only two months; it reached a million bales, by the end of October 1989. By December 1989, the corporation had used its entire funding of $1.5 billion and had to borrow $500 million overseas, at 18% interest. By the end of February 1990, the lending limit had been increased to $2.5 billion. In December 1989, the corporation had issued $500 million of unsecured debt in the form of promissory notes, without any party underwriting the issue, increasing to $1,000 million in January 1990.

During an official visit to China, members of a government delegation were informed that the Chinese would stay out of the wool market, due to a belief that the high floor price would not survive. Realistic economic forecasts predicted a decrease in demand for wool, and that the existing stockpile would depress prices for many years.

By April 1990, the wool stockpile had reached 2.4 million bales, which had cost $2.5 billion to buy but was worth somewhat less in the falling market, and the corporation was still buying around 60% of the annual wool clip. If nothing changed, the stockpile was forecast to reach six million bales by the end of 1991. The Hawke-Keating government, preoccupied among other things with a coming leadership contest, did not tackle the looming crisis, and the minister, John Kerin, was unusually indecisive. However belatedly, Kerin saw the inevitability of resolving the situation, by March 1990. He initially did not take action himself, but tried to get wool industry's leaders to see reason.

Kerin delivered a well reasoned argument, for a lower floor price, in a speech that he gave at a wool growers conference, at Roma, on 23 May 1990. However, the Australian Wool Corporation board and Wool Council remained implacably opposed to either lowering the floor price of 870 cents per kilogram, or abandoning the scheme altogether. On 13 June 1990, Kerin exercised his power to set the floor price himself, at 700 cents a kilogram, but this failed to have a significant effect, and the stockpile continued to grow.

By August 1990, the stockpile stood at 3.25 million bales. With Australia in a recession, unemployment at 11%, and short term interest rates at 18%, the Wool Corporation's borrowings and the reduced export income, due to their wool buying, was negatively affecting Australia's current account. By September 1990, the stockpile was 3.5 million bales, with the market price just above the floor price. But the government and Wool Corporation both tried to tough out the situation, without a further drop in the 700 cent floor price, and tried to resolve the situation by a massive reduction in supply; 15 to 20 million sheep would be slaughtered, and each grower could only sell two-thirds of their previous clip into the market. By November 1991, the stockpile reached 4.2 million bales, nearly equivalent to a whole year's production. It was anticipated that, if the stockpile were to reach 5 million bales, just the annual costs for storage alone would be $560 million. It reached 4.77 million bales on 1 February 1991. It was incurring costs of around $3 million per day (over $1 billion per year), for storage and interest payments.

On 11 February 1991, the Cabinet took a decision to end the reserve price scheme and return to the free market. The scheme was 'suspended', but in reality it was over. A sum of $300 million was allocated to top up growers incomes to the 700 cent floor price, but only until June 1991. That still left a debt of around $3.1 billion and the monstrous stockpile. The Wool Corporation was put into receivership, and the debt would be repaid by selling off the stockpile and other assets of the corporation. The stockpiled wool would be sold off over the next 11 years.

== Aftermath ==
When free market auctions resumed, wool sold for 430 cents a kilogram. In October 1998, wool prices hit a record low of 465 cents per kilogram.

Necessary as it was, the restoration of the free market for wool was disastrous for those buyers who had contracts from the days of the 700 cent floor price, leading to series of large losses and some bankruptcies of European apparel manufacturers. A legacy of the Wool Corporation years was the destruction of the once solid relationship that had existed with the European and Japanese wool buyers. Substitution of wool for other fibres accelerated in the final years of corporation, and high prices made wool buyers seek out cheaper wool, from South America and Russia.

The Australian Wool Realisation Commission (AWRC) was formed, in 1991, to take control of the wool stockpile from the Australian Wool Corporation, and to liquidate it. It took AWRC to 2001 before it was able to sell the last of the stockpile. AWRC was dissolved in 2002. The sale process depressed the market price to some extent, while the stockpile was itself sold significantly below its cost price.

With the collapse of the reserve price scheme, many farmers and wool related businesses went broke. Key processors in England, Germany, France, Italy and Eastern Europe went out of business. The disruptions, caused by the reserve price scheme and its end, accelerated trends in the global apparel business. China invested heavily in new textile technology, factories and machinery, and by 2018 would be buying 80% of Australia's wool clip.

Australian wool production dived, and many growers left the industry. Australian wool production, in 2025, was forecast to be the lowest in 100 years. China still buys around 80% of wool sold in Australia, and it now grows a significant amount of wool itself.
