= Peacock shadow ministry (1989–90) =

Shadow ministry of the Australian opposition, from 1989 to 1990

The Shadow Ministry of Andrew Peacock was the opposition Coalition shadow ministry of Australia from 12 May 1989 to 3 April 1990, opposing Bob Hawke's Labor ministry.

The shadow ministry is a group of senior opposition spokespeople who form an alternative ministry to the government's, whose members shadow or mark each individual Minister or portfolio of the Government.

Andrew Peacock resumed his position as Leader of the Opposition upon his return as leader of the Liberal Party of Australia on 9 May 1989 and appointed a new Shadow Ministry.

== Shadow Ministry ==
The following were members of the Shadow Ministry:

Colour key
(for political parties)
Liberal
National

Shadow Minister	Portfolio
Andrew Peacock MP	Leader of the Opposition; Leader of the Liberal Party
Fred Chaney MP	Deputy Leader of the Opposition; Leader of the Opposition in the Senate; Shadow Minister for Industrial Relations; Deputy Leader of the Liberal Party
Charles Blunt MP	Leader of the National Party; Shadow Minister for Trade and Resources
Bruce Lloyd MP	Deputy Leader of the National Party; Shadow Minister for Primary Industry
Senator Robert Hill	Deputy Leader of the Opposition in the Senate; Shadow Minister for the Australian Capital Territory (to 11 June 1989); Shadow Minister for Foreign Affairs (from 11 June 1989)
Senator Richard Alston	Shadow Minister for Communications
Julian Beale MP	Shadow Minister for Employment and Training
Senator Bronwyn Bishop	Shadow Minister for Federal Affairs
Ray Braithwaite MP	Shadow Minister for Aged Care and Community Services
Neil Brown MP	Shadow Attorney-General
Jim Carlton MP	Shadow Minister for Defence
Wal Fife MP	Shadow Minister for Administrative Services
David Jull MP	Shadow Minister for Aviation
Senator Austin Lewis	Shadow Minister for Industry, Technology and Commerce; Shadow Minister for the Australian Capital Territory (from 11 June 1989)
Peter McGauran MP	Shadow Minister for Energy
Senator David MacGibbon	Shadow Minister for Customs
Ian Macphee MP	Shadow Minister for Foreign Affairs (to 11 June 1989)
John Moore MP	Shadow Minister for Business; Shadow Minister for Consumer Affairs
Senator Jocelyn Newman	Shadow Minister for Defence Science and Personnel
Senator Chris Puplick	Shadow Minister for Environment and Arts
Peter Reith MP	Shadow Minister for Education
Phillip Ruddock MP	Shadow Minister for Immigration and Ethnic Affairs
Peter Shack MP	Shadow Minister for Health
Warwick Smith MP	Shadow Minister for Aboriginal Affairs
Senator John Stone	Shadow Minister for Finance
Wilson Tuckey MP	Shadow Minister for Housing

== See also ==
- Shadow Ministry of John Howard
- Shadow Ministry of John Hewson
- Third Hawke Ministry
