= Electoral results for the Division of Sydney =

Australian division election results

This is a list of electoral results for the Division of Sydney in Australian federal elections from the division's creation in 1969 until the present.

== Members ==
Member	Party	Term
Jim Cope	Labor	1969–1975
Les McMahon	Labor	1975–1983
Peter Baldwin	Labor	1983–1998
Tanya Plibersek	Labor	1998–present

== Election results ==
=== Elections in the 2020s ===
==== 2025 ====
2025 Australian federal election: Sydney
Party	Candidate	Votes	%	±%
Labor	Tanya Plibersek	59,153	55.15	+4.10
Greens	Luc Velez	23,162	21.60	−1.12
Liberal	Alex Xu	18,860	17.59	−1.77
One Nation	Vedran Torbarac	3,698	3.45	+1.68
Socialist Alliance	Rachel Evans	2,376	2.22	+0.97
Total formal votes		107,249	96.27	−0.31
Informal votes		4,161	3.73	+0.31
Turnout		111,410	87.38	−2.50
Notional two-party-preferred count
Labor	Tanya Plibersek	83,737	78.08	+2.42
Liberal	Alex Xu	23,512	21.92	−2.42
Two-candidate-preferred result
Labor	Tanya Plibersek	76,089	70.95	+4.73
Greens	Luc Velez	31,160	29.05	−4.73
Labor hold		Swing	+4.73	

==== 2022 ====
2022 Australian federal election: Sydney
Party	Candidate	Votes	%	±%
Labor	Tanya Plibersek	52,410	50.82	+1.41
Greens	Chetan Sahai	23,732	23.01	+4.94
Liberal	Alexander Andruska	20,276	19.66	−6.95
United Australia	Ryan McAlister	2,298	2.23	+0.79
One Nation	Ben Ferguson	1,889	1.83	+1.83
Socialist Alliance	Andrew Chuter	1,518	1.47	+1.47
Citizens	Wen Zhou	1,002	0.97	+0.97
Total formal votes		103,125	96.72	+0.53
Informal votes		3,499	3.28	−0.53
Turnout		106,624	85.01	−1.29
Notional two-party-preferred count
Labor	Tanya Plibersek	77,933	75.57	+6.90
Liberal	Alexander Andruska	25,192	24.43	−6.90
Two-candidate-preferred result
Labor	Tanya Plibersek	68,770	66.69	−1.98
Greens	Chetan Sahai	34,355	33.31	+33.31
Labor hold				

Alluvial diagram for preference flows in the seat of Sydney in the 2022 federal election. The winning candidate got over 50% of first preference votes, so this alluvial diagram is indicative only, and preference flows were not used to determine the final result. The preference flows were used to determine the two-candidate-preferred.

=== Elections in the 2010s ===
==== 2019 ====
2019 Australian federal election: Sydney
Party	Candidate	Votes	%	±%
Labor	Tanya Plibersek	46,850	49.41	+5.67
Liberal	Jacqui Munro	25,230	26.61	−2.54
Greens	Matthew Thompson	17,134	18.07	−0.74
Science	Aaron Hammond	3,240	3.42	+1.87
United Australia	Adam Holt	1,366	1.44	+1.44
Christian Democrats	Rebecca Reddin	995	1.05	−0.64
Total formal votes		94,815	96.19	+2.18
Informal votes		3,754	3.81	−2.18
Turnout		98,569	86.30	+1.53
Two-party-preferred result
Labor	Tanya Plibersek	65,110	68.67	+3.36
Liberal	Jacqui Munro	29,705	31.33	−3.36
Labor hold		Swing	+3.36	

==== 2016 ====
2016 Australian federal election: Sydney
Party	Candidate	Votes	%	±%
Labor	Tanya Plibersek	38,449	43.74	+0.13
Liberal	Geoffrey Winters	25,622	29.15	−2.98
Greens	Sylvie Ellsmore	16,537	18.81	+0.46
Animal Justice	Mark Berriman	1,497	1.70	+1.70
Christian Democrats	Ula Falanga	1,489	1.69	+0.83
Sex Party	Rebecca Lanning	1,456	1.66	+1.66
Science	Tom Geiser	1,361	1.55	+1.55
Sustainable Australia	Kris Spike	606	0.69	+0.69
Socialist Alliance	Peter Boyle	500	0.57	−0.06
Online Direct Democracy	Tula Tzoras	383	0.44	+0.44
Total formal votes		87,900	94.01	+0.43
Informal votes		5,603	5.99	−0.43
Turnout		93,503	84.77	+0.05
Two-party-preferred result
Labor	Tanya Plibersek	57,410	65.31	+2.44
Liberal	Geoffrey Winters	30,490	34.69	−2.44
Labor hold		Swing	+2.44	

==== 2013 ====
2013 Australian federal election: Sydney
Party	Candidate	Votes	%	±%
Labor	Tanya Plibersek	40,579	46.03	+2.74
Liberal	Sean O'Connor	26,901	30.52	+2.42
Greens	Dianne Hiles	15,273	17.33	−6.42
Independent	Jane Ward	1,408	1.60	+0.06
Palmer United	Timothy Kelly	1,261	1.43	+1.43
Bullet Train	Leah Gartner	791	0.90	+0.90
Christian Democrats	Lesley Mason	723	0.82	+0.82
Socialist Alliance	Peter Boyle	613	0.70	+0.70
Independent	Joanna Rzetelski	602	0.68	+0.68
Total formal votes		88,151	93.80	−0.70
Informal votes		5,830	6.20	+0.70
Turnout		93,981	88.33	+0.18
Two-party-preferred result
Labor	Tanya Plibersek	56,994	64.65	−2.42
Liberal	Sean O'Connor	31,157	35.35	+2.42
Labor hold		Swing	−2.42	

==== 2010 ====
2010 Australian federal election: Sydney
Party	Candidate	Votes	%	±%
Labor	Tanya Plibersek	34,362	43.29	−5.92
Liberal	Gordon Weiss	22,307	28.10	+1.20
Greens	Tony Hickey	18,852	23.75	+3.44
Democrats	Brett Paterson	1,256	1.58	+0.48
Independent	Jane Ward	1,226	1.54	+0.30
Secular	Christopher Owen	718	0.90	+0.90
Communist Alliance	Denis Doherty	656	0.83	+0.83
Total formal votes		79,377	94.50	−1.32
Informal votes		4,620	5.50	+1.32
Turnout		83,997	88.16	−3.65
Two-party-preferred result
Labor	Tanya Plibersek	53,235	67.07	−2.25
Liberal	Gordon Weiss	26,142	32.93	+2.25
Labor hold		Swing	−2.25	

=== Elections in the 2000s ===
==== 2007 ====
2007 Australian federal election: Sydney
Party	Candidate	Votes	%	±%
Labor	Tanya Plibersek	37,506	48.99	+3.92
Liberal	Georgina Anderson	20,440	26.70	−0.81
Greens	Jenny Leong	15,854	20.71	−1.38
Independent	Jane Ward	979	1.28	−0.29
Democrats	Mayo Materazzo	874	1.14	−1.00
Christian Democrats	John Lee	727	0.95	+0.95
Citizens Electoral Council	Adrian Ford	184	0.24	+0.06
Total formal votes		76,564	95.88	+1.09
Informal votes		3,286	4.12	−1.09
Turnout		79,850	90.85	+0.84
Two-party-preferred result
Labor	Tanya Plibersek	53,214	69.50	+2.12
Liberal	Georgina Anderson	23,350	30.50	−2.12
Labor hold		Swing	+2.12	

==== 2004 ====
2004 Australian federal election: Sydney
Party	Candidate	Votes	%	±%
Labor	Tanya Plibersek	36,766	44.68	+0.35
Liberal	Michael Shevers	23,419	28.46	−1.64
Greens	Jenny Leong	17,784	21.61	+6.92
Democrats	Michelle Bleicher	1,701	2.07	−8.81
Independent	Jane Ward	1,346	1.64	+1.64
Socialist Alliance	Susan Price	564	0.69	+0.69
Independent	Michael Webb	553	0.67	+0.67
Citizens Electoral Council	Adrian Ford	150	0.18	+0.18
Total formal votes		82,283	94.71	−1.05
Informal votes		4,600	5.29	+1.05
Turnout		86,883	91.61	+1.37
Two-party-preferred result
Labor	Tanya Plibersek	54,656	66.42	+1.38
Liberal	Michael Shevers	27,627	33.58	−1.38
Labor hold		Swing	+1.38	

==== 2001 ====
2001 Australian federal election: Sydney
Party	Candidate	Votes	%	±%
Labor	Tanya Plibersek	32,962	44.33	−8.58
Liberal	Jeff Pettett	22,380	30.10	+4.28
Greens	Jamie Parker	10,924	14.69	+8.32
Democrats	Sydney Hickman	8,093	10.88	+4.01
Total formal votes		74,359	95.76	+0.08
Informal votes		3,292	4.24	−0.08
Turnout		77,651	91.07	
Two-party-preferred result
Labor	Tanya Plibersek	48,363	65.04	−4.72
Liberal	Jeff Pettett	25,996	34.96	+4.72
Labor hold		Swing	−4.72	

=== Elections in the 1990s ===
==== 1998 ====
1998 Australian federal election: Sydney
Party	Candidate	Votes	%	±%
Labor	Tanya Plibersek	38,920	51.59	+3.21
Liberal	Bruce Morrow	20,899	27.70	+0.09
Democrats	Ben Hanson	5,092	6.75	−2.00
Greens	Jenny Ryde	4,683	6.21	+0.42
One Nation	Warren Hensley	1,917	2.54	+2.54
Unity	Flavia Abdurahman	1,676	2.22	+2.22
Independent	Jenny Munro	591	0.78	+0.78
Democratic Socialist	John Percy	568	0.75	+0.75
No Aircraft Noise	Anna Lunsmann	538	0.71	−6.10
	Denis Doherty	441	0.58	+0.58
Natural Law	Michael Lippmann	112	0.15	−0.18
Total formal votes		75,437	95.77	+0.29
Informal votes		3,331	4.23	−0.29
Turnout		78,768	90.25	−2.60
Two-party-preferred result
Labor	Tanya Plibersek	50,463	66.89	+3.09
Liberal	Bruce Morrow	24,974	33.11	−3.09
Labor hold		Swing	+3.09	

==== 1996 ====
1996 Australian federal election: Sydney
Party	Candidate	Votes	%	±%
Labor	Peter Baldwin	35,788	48.38	−10.10
Liberal	Peter Fussell	20,430	27.62	+1.63
Democrats	Paul Nederlof	6,471	8.75	+4.81
No Aircraft Noise	Wendy Bacon	5,042	6.82	+6.82
Greens	Sue Stock	4,285	5.79	−1.95
	Karen Fletcher	584	0.79	+0.79
Independent	Peter Bushby	537	0.73	+0.73
Call to Australia	Janne Peterson	483	0.65	+0.65
Natural Law	Michael Lippmann	242	0.33	−0.57
	Donald O'Halloran	112	0.15	−0.11
Total formal votes		73,974	95.48	−1.28
Informal votes		3,502	4.52	+1.28
Turnout		77,476	92.85	+0.40
Two-party-preferred result
Labor	Peter Baldwin	46,703	63.80	−5.67
Liberal	Peter Fussell	26,495	36.20	+5.67
Labor hold		Swing	−5.67	

==== 1993 ====
1993 Australian federal election: Sydney
Party	Candidate	Votes	%	±%
Labor	Peter Baldwin	41,621	58.48	+13.40
Liberal	James Fisher	18,493	25.98	−0.87
Greens	Mark Berriman	5,513	7.75	+3.37
Democrats	Bob Dawson	2,805	3.94	−9.70
	Margaret Gleeson	1,914	2.69	+2.69
Natural Law	Bronia Hatfield	639	0.90	+0.90
	Donald O'Halloran	183	0.26	+0.26
Total formal votes		71,168	96.76	+0.33
Informal votes		2,385	3.24	−0.33
Turnout		73,553	92.45	
Two-party-preferred result
Labor	Peter Baldwin	49,402	69.47	+4.38
Liberal	James Fisher	21,708	30.53	−4.38
Labor hold		Swing	+4.38	

==== 1990 ====
1990 Australian federal election: Sydney
Party	Candidate	Votes	%	±%
Labor	Peter Baldwin	30,648	50.8	+0.3
Liberal	Stephen Woodhill	13,047	21.6	−3.7
Democrats	Bob Dawson	7,697	12.8	+4.5
Sydney Greens	Steve Brigham	6,745	11.2	+11.2
Independent	Ken Henderson	1,106	1.8	+1.8
Call to Australia	John Davern	757	1.3	+1.3
Independent	Nadar Ponnuswamy	274	0.5	+0.5
Total formal votes		60,274	96.0	
Informal votes		2,539	4.0	
Turnout		62,813	92.2	
Two-party-preferred result
Labor	Peter Baldwin	42,890	71.4	+1.5
Liberal	Stephen Woodhill	17,183	28.6	−1.5
Labor hold		Swing	+1.5	

=== Elections in the 1980s ===
==== 1987 ====
1987 Australian federal election: Sydney
Party	Candidate	Votes	%	±%
Labor	Peter Baldwin	29,795	50.5	−6.7
Liberal	Les Morka	14,911	25.3	+2.6
Independent	Jack Mundey	7,918	13.4	+13.4
Democrats	William Cole	4,916	8.3	+0.2
Independent	Vito Radice	1,457	2.5	+2.5
Total formal votes		58,997	93.6	
Informal votes		4,034	6.4	
Turnout		63,031	87.9	
Two-party-preferred result
Labor	Peter Baldwin	41,220	69.9	−3.5
Liberal	Les Morka	17,746	30.1	+3.5
Labor hold		Swing	−3.5	

==== 1984 ====
1984 Australian federal election: Sydney
Party	Candidate	Votes	%	±%
Labor	Peter Baldwin	32,412	57.2	−7.0
Liberal	James Harker-Mortlock	12,847	22.7	+1.2
Democrats	Michael Walsh	4,600	8.1	+1.0
Independent	Daphne Gollan	3,118	5.5	+5.5
Independent	Vito Radice	2,219	3.9	+3.9
Communist	Aileen Beaver	1,213	2.1	−1.3
Independent	Noel Hazard	290	0.5	+0.5
Total formal votes		56,699	89.6	
Informal votes		6,601	10.4	
Turnout		63,300	90.2	
Two-party-preferred result
Labor	Peter Baldwin	41,590	73.4	+0.7
Liberal	James Harker-Mortlock	15,095	26.6	−0.7
Labor hold		Swing	+0.7	

==== 1983 ====
1983 Australian federal election: Sydney
Party	Candidate	Votes	%	±%
Labor	Peter Baldwin	40,360	67.2	+5.2
Liberal	Ron Cibas	12,559	20.9	−1.7
Democrats	Jennifer Macleod	4,286	7.1	−1.0
Communist	Aileen Beaver	2,066	3.4	−1.4
Socialist Workers	James Percy	758	1.3	−2.2
Total formal votes		60,029	96.8	
Informal votes		1,954	3.2	
Turnout		61,983	90.2	
Two-party-preferred result
Labor	Peter Baldwin		75.7	+1.9
Liberal	Ron Cibas		24.3	−1.9
Labor hold		Swing	+1.9	

==== 1980 ====
1980 Australian federal election: Sydney
Party	Candidate	Votes	%	±%
Labor	Les McMahon	36,720	62.0	−1.2
Liberal	Cliff Reece	13,364	22.6	−0.1
Democrats	Maxwell Adams	4,816	8.1	+2.6
Communist	Judy Mundey	2,850	4.8	−1.5
Socialist Workers	Juanita Keig	1,477	2.5	+2.5
Total formal votes		59,227	95.9	
Informal votes		2,545	4.1	
Turnout		61,772	88.6	
Two-party-preferred result
Labor	Les McMahon		73.8	+0.4
Liberal	Cliff Reece		26.2	−0.4
Labor hold		Swing	+0.4	

=== Elections in the 1970s ===
==== 1977 ====
1977 Australian federal election: Sydney
Party	Candidate	Votes	%	±%
Labor	Les McMahon	39,307	63.2	−0.9
Liberal	Andrew Morrison	14,158	22.7	−5.1
Communist	Aileen Beaver	3,935	6.3	+0.7
Democrats	Judith Roberts	3,428	5.5	+5.5
Socialist	Harry Black	847	1.4	+1.4
Independent	Naomi Mayers	560	0.9	+0.9
Total formal votes		62,235	95.7	
Informal votes		2,773	4.3	
Turnout		65,008	90.5	
Two-party-preferred result
Labor	Les McMahon		73.4	+3.3
Liberal	Andrew Morrison		26.6	−3.3
Labor hold		Swing	+3.3	

==== 1975 ====
1975 Australian federal election: Sydney
Party	Candidate	Votes	%	±%
Labor	Les McMahon	31,493	66.1	−5.8
Liberal	Janis Wallace	12,268	25.8	+6.0
Communist	Laurie Aarons	2,667	5.6	+5.6
Workers	Merilyn Giesekam	644	1.4	+1.4
Independent	Roderick MacNeil	537	1.1	+1.1
Total formal votes		47,609	96.9	
Informal votes		1,539	3.1	
Turnout		49,148	88.4	
Two-party-preferred result
Labor	Les McMahon		72.1	−5.9
Liberal	Janis Wallace		27.9	+5.9
Labor hold		Swing	−5.9	

==== 1974 ====
1974 Australian federal election: Sydney
Party	Candidate	Votes	%	±%
Labor	Jim Cope	32,244	71.9	+1.6
Liberal	Janis Wallace	8,876	19.8	+5.1
Australia	Julia Bovard	2,598	5.8	−1.8
Socialist	Pat Clancy	1,132	2.5	+0.1
Total formal votes		44,850	96.3	
Informal votes		1,709	3.7	
Turnout		46,559	89.1	
Two-party-preferred result
Labor	Jim Cope		78.0	−2.7
Liberal	Janis Wallace		22.0	+2.7
Labor hold		Swing	−2.7	

==== 1972 ====
1972 Australian federal election: Sydney
Party	Candidate	Votes	%	±%
Labor	Jim Cope	31,585	70.3	+5.2
Liberal	Graham Robertson	6,609	14.7	−5.4
Australia	Allan Sorrensen	3,431	7.6	+7.6
Communist	Laurie Aarons	2,236	5.0	+5.0
Socialist	Pat Clancy	1,062	2.4	+2.4
Total formal votes		44,923	96.0	
Informal votes		1,883	4.0	
Turnout		46,806	90.2	
Two-party-preferred result
Labor	Jim Cope		80.7	+7.1
Liberal	Graham Robertson		19.3	−7.1
Labor hold		Swing	+7.1	

=== Elections in the 1960s ===
==== 1969 ====
1969 Australian federal election: Sydney
Party	Candidate	Votes	%	±%
Labor	Jim Cope	31,822	65.1	+0.1
Liberal	Graham Robertson	9,805	20.1	−6.5
Independent	Nick Origlass	3,362	6.9	+6.9
Democratic Labor	Norma Boyle	2,381	4.9	−1.2
Pensioner Power	Donald Lewis	623	1.3	+1.3
Independent	Ian Channell	571	1.2	+1.2
Independent	Shane Watson	316	0.6	+0.6
Total formal votes		48,880	94.6	
Informal votes		2,773	5.4	
Turnout		51,653	89.1	
Two-party-preferred result
Labor	Jim Cope		73.6	+6.8
Liberal	Graham Robertson		26.4	−6.8
Labor notional hold		Swing	+6.8	
