= James McMahon =

James McMahon may refer to:

== Politics ==
- James McMahon (Canadian politician) (1830–1909), Ontario, Canada doctor and politician
- James Leslie McMahon or Les McMahon (1930–2015), Australian politician
- James O'Brien McMahon or Brien McMahon (1903–1952), United States senator
- Jim McMahon (politician) (born 1980), British politician

== Others ==
- James McMahon (priest) (1817–1901), Irish-born priest
- James McMahon (astronomer), American amateur astronomer
- James McMahon (businessman) (1838–1914), Irish-Australian businessman
- James McMahon (mathematician) (1856–1922), American educator and mathematician
- James E. McMahon, United States Attorney in South Dakota
- Jim McMahon (born 1959), American football player
- James MacMahon (c. 1857–1915), Australian impresario, of MacMahon brothers

== See also ==
- James Macmahon (1865–1954), Irish businessman
