= Howard shadow ministry (1995–96) =

Shadow ministry of the Australian opposition leader, from 5 June 2022

The Shadow Ministry of John Howard was the opposition Coalition shadow ministry of Australia from 30 January 1995 to 11 March 1996, opposing Paul Keating's Australian Labor Party ministry.

The shadow cabinet is a group of senior Opposition spokespeople who form an alternative Cabinet to the government's, whose members shadow or mark each individual Minister or portfolio of the Government.

John Howard resumed his position as Leader of the Opposition upon his return as leader of the Liberal Party of Australia on 30 January 1995, and appointed a new Shadow Cabinet.

== Shadow Cabinet ==
The following were members of the Shadow Cabinet:

Colour key
(for political parties)
Liberal
National

Shadow Minister	Portfolio
John Howard MP	Leader of the Opposition; Leader of the Liberal Party
Peter Costello MP	Deputy Leader of the Opposition; Shadow Treasurer; Deputy Leader of the Liberal Party
Tim Fischer MP	Leader of the National Party; Shadow Minister for Trade
John Anderson MP	Deputy Leader of the National Party; Shadow Minister for Primary Industry
Senator Robert Hill	Leader of the Opposition in the Senate; Shadow Minister for Education, Science and Technology
Senator Richard Alston	Deputy Leader of the Opposition in the Senate; Shadow Minister for Communications and the Arts
Alexander Downer MP	Shadow Minister for Foreign Affairs
Ian McLachlan MP	Shadow Minister for Environment and Heritage (to 10 March 1995)
John Moore MP	Shadow Minister for Industry and Commerce
Peter Reith MP	Shadow Minister for Industrial Relations
Senator Jocelyn Newman	Shadow Minister for Defence
Bronwyn Bishop MP	Shadow Minister for Privatisation; Shadow Minister for Commonwealth-State Relations
David Kemp MP	Shadow Minister for Employment, Training and Family Services
Peter McGauran MP	Shadow Minister for Resources and Energy
Philip Ruddock MP	Shadow Minister for Social Security; Shadow Minister for Senior Citizens
Geoff Prosser MP	Shadow Minister for Finance
Senator Ian Macdonald	Shadow Minister for Regional Development and Infrastructure
Senator Jim Short	Shadow Minister for Immigration and Ethnic Affairs
John Sharp MP	Shadow Minister for Transport
Dr Michael Wooldridge MP	Shadow Minister for Health and Human Resources
Senator Amanda Vanstone	Shadow Attorney-General; Shadow Minister for Justice
Senator Rod Kemp	Shadow Minister for Environment and Heritage (from 10 March 1995)

== Outer shadow ministry ==
Shadow minister	Portfolio
Judi Moylan MP	Shadow Minister for Small Business; Shadow Minister for Women's Affairs
Senator Warwick Parer	Shadow Minister for Aviation; Shadow Minister for Tourism; Shadow Minister for Customs
Wilson Tuckey MP	Shadow Minister for Veterans' Affairs, Defence Science and Personnel
Chris Gallus MP	Shadow Minister for Aboriginal and Torres Strait Islander Affairs
Senator Grant Tambling	Shadow Minister for Housing, External Territories, Northern Development
Senator Rod Kemp	Shadow Minister for Administrative Services, Australian Capital Territory, Public Administration (to 10 March 1995)
Bruce Scott MP	Shadow Minister for Local Government
Senator Ian Campbell	Shadow Minister for Sport, Recreation and Youth Affairs
David Connolly MP	Shadow Minister for Superannuation and Retirement Income
Michael Ronaldson MP	Shadow Minister for Schools, Vocational Educational and Training
Warren Truss MP	Shadow Minister for Consumer Affairs
