= Electoral results for the Division of Pearce =

Australian division election results

This is a list of electoral results for the Division of Pearce in Australian federal elections from the division's creation in 1990 until the present.

== Members ==
Member	Party	Term
Fred Chaney	Liberal	1990–1993
Judi Moylan	Liberal	1993–2013
Christian Porter	Liberal	2013–2022
Tracey Roberts	Labor	2022–present

== Election results ==
=== Elections in the 2020s ===
==== 2025 ====
2025 Australian federal election: Pearce
Party	Candidate	Votes	%	±%
Labor	Tracey Roberts	39,303	40.07	−2.33
Liberal	Jan Norberger	27,979	28.52	−1.60
Greens	Nicholas D'Alonzo	11,640	11.87	+0.63
One Nation	John Burton	9,089	9.27	+4.57
Legalise Cannabis	Ramon Granados Rangel	6,777	6.91	+6.91
Christians	Vanessa Montgomery	3,305	3.37	+1.39
Total formal votes		98,093	96.94	+2.96
Informal votes		3,094	3.06	−2.96
Turnout		101,187	87.78	+5.43
Two-party-preferred result
Labor	Tracey Roberts	55,360	56.44	−2.40
Liberal	Jan Norberger	42,733	43.56	+2.40
Labor hold		Swing	−2.40	

==== 2022 ====
2022 Australian federal election: Pearce
Party	Candidate	Votes	%	±%
Labor	Tracey Roberts	40,596	42.77	+11.04
Liberal	Linda Aitken	28,380	29.90	−13.47
Greens	Donna Nelson	10,416	10.97	+1.22
One Nation	Aaron Malloy	4,295	4.53	−2.30
United Australia	Trevor Dalby	2,534	2.67	+0.05
Western Australia	Jim Paice	2,206	2.32	+1.57
Great Australian	Roslyn Stewart	2,160	2.28	+2.28
Christians	Vanessa Montgomery	2,097	2.21	+0.29
Liberal Democrats	David Marshall	1,548	1.63	+1.63
Federation	Nigel March	684	0.72	+0.72
Total formal votes		94,916	93.77	−0.22
Informal votes		6,306	6.23	+0.22
Turnout		101,222	87.86	−0.55
Two-party-preferred result
Labor	Tracey Roberts	56,040	59.04	+14.23
Liberal	Linda Aitken	38,876	40.96	−14.23
Labor gain from Liberal		Swing	+14.23	

Alluvial diagram for preference flows in the seat of Pearce in the 2022 federal election. indicates at what stage the winning candidate had over 50% of the votes and was declared the winner.

=== Elections in the 2010s ===
==== 2019 ====
2019 Australian federal election: Pearce
Party	Candidate	Votes	%	±%
Liberal	Christian Porter	43,689	43.72	−1.72
Labor	Kim Travers	29,027	29.05	−5.20
Greens	Eugene Marshall	8,676	8.68	−2.28
One Nation	Sandy Old	8,199	8.21	+8.21
United Australia	Rob Forster	2,495	2.50	+2.50
Shooters, Fishers, Farmers	Ross Williamson	2,125	2.13	+2.13
Christians	Magdeleen Strauss	1,609	1.61	+1.61
Independent	Colin Butland	1,456	1.46	+1.46
National	Steve Blyth	1,342	1.34	−3.35
Western Australia	Michael Calautti	1,305	1.31	+1.31
Total formal votes		99,923	93.03	−2.42
Informal votes		7,491	6.97	+2.42
Turnout		107,414	89.82	+2.47
Two-party-preferred result
Liberal	Christian Porter	57,478	57.52	+3.89
Labor	Kim Travers	42,445	42.48	−3.89
Liberal hold		Swing	+3.89	

==== 2016 ====
2016 Australian federal election: Pearce
Party	Candidate	Votes	%	±%
Liberal	Christian Porter	39,551	45.44	−1.65
Labor	Thomas French	29,809	34.25	+8.08
Greens	Lee-Anne Miles	9,543	10.96	+1.13
National	Maddison Simmonds	4,080	4.69	+0.14
Rise Up Australia	Taffy Samuriwo-Vuntarde	4,049	4.65	+3.72
Total formal votes		87,032	95.45	+1.18
Informal votes		4,150	4.55	−1.18
Turnout		91,182	87.35	+5.90
Two-party-preferred result
Liberal	Christian Porter	46,672	53.63	−5.68
Labor	Thomas French	40,360	46.37	+5.68
Liberal hold		Swing	−5.68	

==== 2013 ====
2013 Australian federal election: Pearce
Party	Candidate	Votes	%	±%
Liberal	Christian Porter	40,275	45.67	−4.24
Labor	Madeleine West	22,827	25.88	−3.64
Greens	Sarah Nielsen-Harvey	9,901	11.23	−2.01
Palmer United	Frank Hough	6,587	7.47	+7.47
National	Craig McAllister	4,326	4.91	+2.37
Christians	Danielle Canas	1,746	1.98	+1.98
Rise Up Australia	Diane Davies	791	0.90	+0.90
Katter's Australian	Eddie Richards	727	0.82	+0.82
Democrats	Matthew Corica	572	0.65	+0.65
Citizens Electoral Council	Norman Gay	439	0.50	−0.08
Total formal votes		88,191	94.10	−0.19
Informal votes		5,528	5.90	+0.19
Turnout		93,719	92.49	−0.63
Two-party-preferred result
Liberal	Christian Porter	51,206	58.06	−0.80
Labor	Madeleine West	36,985	41.94	+0.80
Liberal hold		Swing	−0.80	

==== 2010 ====
2010 Australian federal election: Pearce
Party	Candidate	Votes	%	±%
Liberal	Judi Moylan	39,248	49.91	−0.52
Labor	Bill Leadbetter	23,214	29.52	−3.63
Greens	Toni Warden	10,414	13.24	+4.32
National	Darren Moir	1,999	2.54	+2.54
Christian Democrats	Janet Broadstock	1,691	2.15	+0.18
Family First	Ian Rose	1,619	2.06	+0.60
Citizens Electoral Council	Chris Pepper	456	0.58	+0.28
Total formal votes		78,641	94.29	−1.72
Informal votes		4,762	5.71	+1.72
Turnout		83,403	93.16	−0.02
Two-party-preferred result
Liberal	Judi Moylan	46,292	58.86	+1.17
Labor	Bill Leadbetter	32,349	41.14	−1.17
Liberal hold		Swing	+1.17	

=== Elections in the 2000s ===
==== 2007 ====
2007 Australian federal election: Pearce
Party	Candidate	Votes	%	±%
Liberal	Judi Moylan	43,874	51.81	−1.91
Labor	Christopher Myson	27,111	32.01	+3.96
Greens	Yvonne Dols	7,277	8.59	+0.74
Christian Democrats	Paul Mewhor	1,683	1.99	−0.99
Independent	Steve Branwhite	1,533	1.81	+1.81
One Nation	David Gunnyon	1,375	1.62	−2.12
Family First	David Bolt	1,239	1.46	+1.46
Socialist Alliance	Annolies Truman	316	0.37	−0.01
Citizens Electoral Council	Ron McLean	275	0.32	−0.21
Total formal votes		84,683	96.03	+1.33
Informal votes		3,505	3.97	−1.33
Turnout		88,188	93.30	−0.37
Two-party-preferred result
Liberal	Judi Moylan	50,022	59.07	−3.87
Labor	Christopher Myson	34,661	40.93	+3.87
Liberal hold		Swing	−3.87	

==== 2004 ====
2004 Australian federal election: Pearce
Party	Candidate	Votes	%	±%
Liberal	Judi Moylan	40,300	53.72	+8.89
Labor	David Ritter	21,046	28.05	−2.27
Greens	Dominique Lieb	5,891	7.85	+0.63
One Nation	David Gunnyon	2,803	3.74	−4.95
Christian Democrats	Robert Merrells	2,235	2.98	+1.76
Democrats	Donella McLean	1,155	1.54	−2.94
New Country	Jeanette Radisich	911	1.21	+1.21
Citizens Electoral Council	Ron McLean	396	0.53	+0.10
Socialist Alliance	Annolies Truman	286	0.38	+0.38
Total formal votes		75,023	94.70	−0.32
Informal votes		4,201	5.30	+0.32
Turnout		79,224	93.67	−1.30
Two-party-preferred result
Liberal	Judi Moylan	47,219	62.94	+6.06
Labor	David Ritter	27,804	37.06	−6.06
Liberal hold		Swing	+6.06	

==== 2001 ====
2001 Australian federal election: Pearce
Party	Candidate	Votes	%	±%
Liberal	Judi Moylan	31,509	44.83	+4.45
Labor	Liam Costello	21,306	30.32	+1.12
One Nation	Ken Collins	6,105	8.69	−4.36
Greens	Juanita Miller	5,072	7.22	+1.86
Democrats	Jack Fox	3,147	4.48	−0.04
National	Chris Nelson	1,985	2.82	+0.12
Christian Democrats	Vivian Hill	858	1.22	+1.11
Citizens Electoral Council	Stuart Smith	299	0.43	+0.05
Total formal votes		70,281	95.02	−1.22
Informal votes		3,682	4.98	+1.22
Turnout		73,963	95.33	
Two-party-preferred result
Liberal	Judi Moylan		56.87	+1.68
Labor	Liam Costello		43.13	−1.68
Liberal hold		Swing	+1.68	

=== Elections in the 1990s ===
==== 1998 ====
1998 Australian federal election: Pearce
Party	Candidate	Votes	%	±%
Liberal	Judi Moylan	32,475	43.54	−11.41
Labor	Paul Andrews	22,751	30.51	+2.85
One Nation	David Gunnyon	9,381	12.58	+12.58
Greens	Keith Schekkerman	4,420	5.93	−0.95
Democrats	Barbara Moxham	4,248	5.70	−3.96
National	Roger Cooper	1,017	1.36	+0.59
Citizens Electoral Council	John Burt	288	0.39	+0.39
Total formal votes		74,580	96.36	−0.65
Informal votes		2,820	3.64	+0.65
Turnout		77,400	95.25	−0.63
Two-party-preferred result
Liberal	Judi Moylan	41,246	55.30	−8.29
Labor	Paul Andrews	33,334	44.70	+8.29
Liberal hold		Swing	−8.29	

==== 1996 ====
1996 Australian federal election: Pearce
Party	Candidate	Votes	%	±%
Liberal	Judi Moylan	38,070	54.18	+2.82
Labor	Paul Andrews	20,313	28.91	−3.68
Democrats	Julie Ward	7,031	10.01	+5.46
Greens	Robert Barnacle	4,857	6.91	−1.15
Total formal votes		70,271	96.93	−0.99
Informal votes		2,229	3.07	+0.99
Turnout		72,500	95.88	−0.34
Two-party-preferred result
Liberal	Judi Moylan	43,306	62.18	+3.42
Labor	Paul Andrews	26,342	37.82	−3.42
Liberal hold		Swing	+3.42	

==== 1993 ====
1993 Australian federal election: Pearce
Party	Candidate	Votes	%	±%
Liberal	Judi Moylan	34,777	51.35	−0.80
Labor	Patrick Jebb	22,065	32.58	+5.05
Greens	Stephen Hall	5,458	8.06	−0.61
Democrats	Peter Lambert	3,077	4.54	−5.50
National	Mark Forecast	2,345	3.46	+3.46
Total formal votes		67,722	97.91	+0.92
Informal votes		1,443	2.09	−0.92
Turnout		69,165	96.22	
Two-party-preferred result
Liberal	Judi Moylan	39,771	58.76	−0.17
Labor	Patrick Jebb	27,909	41.24	+0.17
Liberal hold		Swing	−0.17	

==== 1990 ====
1990 Australian federal election: Pearce
Party	Candidate	Votes	%	±%
Liberal	Fred Chaney	32,424	52.2	+8.8
Labor	John Duncan	17,115	27.5	−16.9
Democrats	Peter Lambert	6,245	10.0	+6.0
Greens	Greg Bankoff	5,389	8.7	+8.7
Grey Power	Gina Pintabona	994	1.6	+1.6
Total formal votes		62,167	97.0	
Informal votes		1,924	3.0	
Turnout		64,091	95.0	
Two-party-preferred result
Liberal	Fred Chaney	36,563	58.9	+6.0
Labor	John Duncan	25,477	41.1	−6.0
Liberal notional hold		Swing	+6.0	
