= Hewson shadow ministry =

Shadow ministry of Australia (1990–1994)

The Shadow Ministry of John Hewson was the opposition Coalition shadow ministry of Australia from 11 April 1990 to 23 May 1994, opposing the Australian Labor Party's Hawke–Keating government.

The shadow cabinet is a group of senior Opposition spokespeople who form an alternative Cabinet to the government's, whose members shadow or mark each individual Minister or portfolio of the Government.

John Hewson became Leader of the Opposition upon his election as leader of the Liberal Party on 3 April 1990, and appointed his first Shadow Cabinet. He appointed a second, rearranged Shadow Cabinet after losing the 1993 election.

== First arrangement ==
=== Shadow Cabinet ===
The following were members of the Shadow Cabinet:

Colour key
(for political parties)
Liberal
National
Country Liberal (Nationals caucus)

Shadow Minister	Portfolio
John Hewson MP	Leader of the Opposition; Leader of the Liberal Party
Peter Reith MP	Deputy Leader of the Opposition; Shadow Treasurer; Deputy Leader of the Liberal Party
Tim Fischer MP	Leader of the National Party; Shadow Minister for Energy and Resources
Bruce Lloyd MP	Deputy Leader of the National Party; Shadow Minister for Primary Industry
Senator Robert Hill	Leader of the Opposition in the Senate; Shadow Minister for Foreign Affairs
Senator Peter Durack	Deputy Leader of the Opposition in the Senate; Shadow Minister for Defence (to 24 April 1992); Shadow Attorney-General (24 April 1992 to 23 May 1992)
Neil Brown MP	Shadow Minister for Communications (to 25 February 1991)
Jim Carlton MP	Shadow Minister without portfolio
Fred Chaney MP	Shadow Minister for the Environment
Wal Fife MP	Shadow Minister without portfolio
John Howard MP	Shadow Minister for Industrial Relations, Employment and Training
David Jull MP	Shadow Minister for Tourism and Aviation
Dr David Kemp MP	Shadow Minister for Education
Ian McLachlan MP	Shadow Minister for Industry and Commerce
Andrew Peacock MP	Shadow Attorney-General (to 24 April 1992); Shadow Minister for Justice (to 24 April 1992)
John Sharp MP	Shadow Minister for Shipping and Waterfront Reform

=== Outer shadow ministry ===
Shadow minister	Portfolio
Senator Richard Alston	Shadow Minister for Social Security
Senator Michael Baume	Shadow Minister for Arts, Heritage, Sport and Youth Affairs
Julian Beale MP	Shadow Minister for Privatisation
Ray Braithwaite MP	Shadow Minister for Community Services and Aged Care
Peter Costello MP	Shadow Minister for Corporate Law Reform, Consumer Affairs; Shadow Attorney-General (from 23 May 1992)
Alexander Downer MP	Shadow Minister for Trade; Shadow Minister for Trade Negotiations
David Hawker MP	Shadow Minister for Land Transport
Peter McGauran MP	Shadow Minister for Science and Technology
Senator Jocelyn Newman	Shadow Minister for Veterans' Affairs; Shadow Minister for Defence Science and Personnel; Shadow Minister for Status of Women
Senator Warwick Parer	Shadow Minister for Administrative Services and Local Government; Shadow Minister for the Australian Capital Territory (to 28 April 1992)
Geoff Prosser MP	Shadow Minister for Small Business, Housing and Customs
Phillip Ruddock MP	Shadow Minister for Immigration and Ethnic Affairs
Senator Jim Short	Shadow Minister for Finance
Warwick Smith MP	Shadow Minister for Communications (from 25 February 1991)
Senator Grant Tambling	Shadow Minister for Regional Development, External Territories and Northern Australia
Dr Bob Woods MP	Shadow Minister for Health
Dr Michael Wooldridge MP	Shadow Minister for Aboriginal Affairs
Senator Ian Macdonald	Shadow Minister for the Australian Capital Territory (from 28 April 1992)

== Second arrangement ==
The Shadow Ministry was rearranged following the 1993 election.

=== Shadow Cabinet ===
Colour key
(for political parties)
Liberal
National
Country Liberal (Nationals caucus)

Shadow Minister	Portfolio
John Hewson MP	Leader of the Opposition; Leader of the Liberal Party
Dr Michael Wooldridge MP	Deputy Leader of the Opposition; Shadow Minister for Education, Employment and Training; Deputy Leader of the Liberal Party
Tim Fischer MP	Leader of the National Party; Shadow Minister for Trade
John Anderson MP	Deputy Leader of the National Party; Shadow Minister for Primary Industry
Senator Robert Hill	Leader of the Opposition in the Senate; Shadow Minister for Foreign Affairs
Senator Richard Alston	Deputy Leader of the Opposition in the Senate; Shadow Minister for Communications
Senator Ron Boswell	Shadow Minister for Northern Australia and External Territories
Peter Costello MP	Shadow Minister for Finance
Alexander Downer MP	Shadow Treasurer
John Howard MP	Shadow Minister for Industrial Relations
David Jull MP	Shadow Minister for Tourism and Aviation
Dr David Kemp MP	Shadow Minister for Science, Technology and Export Development
Senator Ian McDonald	Shadow Minister for Local Government and the Australian Capital Territory
Peter McGauran MP	Shadow Minister for Resources and Energy
Ian McLachlan MP	Shadow Minister for Infrastructure and National Development
Senator Jocelyn Newman	Shadow Minister for the Family; Shadow Minister for Health
Andrew Peacock MP	Shadow Minister for Foreign Affairs
Phillip Ruddock MP	Shadow Minister for Social Security
Senator Jim Short	Shadow Minister for Immigration and Citizenship

=== Outer shadow ministry ===
Shadow minister	Portfolio
Kevin Andrews MP	Shadow Minister for Privatisation, Administrative Services
David Connolly MP	Shadow Minister for Schools, Vocational Education and Training
Chris Gallus MP	Shadow Minister for the Environment
Senator Sue Knowles	Shadow Minister for Multicultural Affairs
Senator David MacGibbon	Shadow Minister for Veterans' Affairs, Defence Science and Personnel
Peter Nugent MP	Shadow Minister for Aboriginal and Torres Strait Islander Affairs
Senator Kay Patterson	Shadow Minister for Senior Citizens and Aged Care
Michael Ronaldson MP	Shadow Minister for Youth, Sport and Recreation
Bruce Scott MP	Shadow Minister for Rural and Regional Development
John Sharp MP	Shadow Minister for Transport
Senator Grant Tambling	Shadow Minister for Public Housing and Community Services
Senator Amanda Vanstone	Shadow Minister for Justice; Shadow Minister for Consumer Affairs
Daryl Williams QC MP	Shadow Attorney-General

== See also ==
- Shadow Ministry of Alexander Downer
- Fourth Hawke Ministry
- First Keating Ministry
- Second Keating Ministry
