= Minister for Women (Australia) =

Australian cabinet position

- Commonwealth Coat of Arms

- Flag of Australia

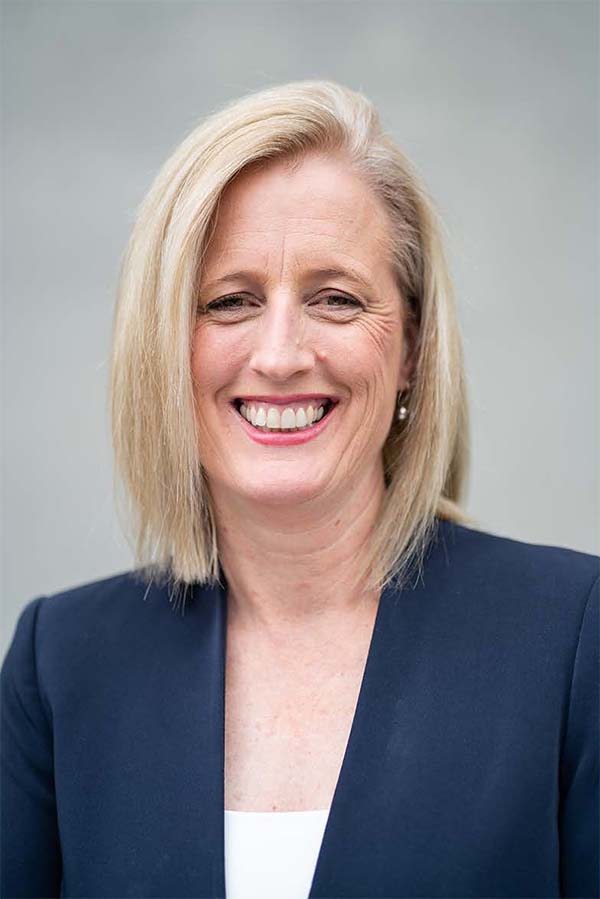
- Incumbent; Katy Gallagher since 23 May 2022
- Department of the Prime Minister and Cabinet
- Style: The Honourable
- Appointer: Governor-General on the advice of the prime minister
- Inaugural holder: Judi Moylan (as Minister for the Status of Women)
- Formation: 9 October 1997
- Website: ministers.pmc.gov.au/gallagher

The Minister for Women in the Government of Australia is Katy Gallagher, who since 23 May 2022 has been a member of the Albanese ministry. Ministers holding the position, first introduced in 1976 during the Second Fraser ministry, have held several different titles. They have often held other portfolios, and sometimes sat in Cabinet of Australia. All but the first two office-holders have been women.

== History ==
A women's affairs branch was established within the Department of Prime Minister and Cabinet in 1976. Prime Minister Malcolm Fraser announced he wished to "have formal machinery set up for the co-ordination of government activity in women's affairs". He appointed Tony Street as the first Minister Assisting the Prime Minister in Women’s Affairs; Street and his successor Ian Macphee are the only men to have held the post. Senator Margaret Guilfoyle, the only female minister at the time (and one of only six women in parliament), declined the position, as she was unwilling to be pigeonholed into portfolios that were considered "women's work".

== Scope ==
In the Government of Australia, the Minister administers the portfolio through the Office for Women within the Department of the Prime Minister and Cabinet, with the budget being administered through the Department of Social Services. Currently, the Minister works with other Government Ministers to ensure that women's issues and gender equality are taken into consideration in policy and program development and implementation. The Office for Women supports the Minister in this role, and is the central source of advice for Government agencies on the impact of Government policies and programmes for Australian women.

== List of ministers ==
The following individuals have been appointed as Minister for Women, or any of its precedent titles:

Order	Minister	Party	Prime Minister	Title	Term start	Term end	Term in office
1	Tony Street	Liberal	Fraser	Minister Assisting the Prime Minister in Women's Affairs	16 August 1976	8 November 1976	84 days
2	Ian Macphee	Liberal	Fraser	Minister Assisting the Prime Minister in Women's Affairs	8 November 1976	20 December 1977	1 year, 42 days
3	Susan Ryan	Labor	Hawke	Minister Assisting the Prime Minister for the Status of Women	11 March 1983	19 January 1988	4 years, 314 days
4	Margaret Reynolds	Labor	Hawke	Minister Assisting the Prime Minister for the Status of Women	19 January 1988	4 April 1990	2 years, 75 days
5	Wendy Fatin	Labor	Hawke	Minister Assisting the Prime Minister for the Status of Women	4 April 1990	20 December 1991	2 years, 354 days
5	Wendy Fatin	Labor	Keating	Minister Assisting the Prime Minister for the Status of Women	20 December 1991	24 March 1993	2 years, 354 days
6	Rosemary Crowley	Labor	Keating	Minister Assisting the Prime Minister for the Status of Women	24 March 1993	23 December 1993	274 days
7	Ros Kelly	Labor	Keating	Minister Assisting the Prime Minister for the Status of Women	23 December 1993	1 March 1994	68 days
8	Carmen Lawrence	Labor	Keating	Minister Assisting the Prime Minister for the Status of Women	25 March 1994	11 March 1996	1 year, 352 days
9	Jocelyn Newman	Liberal	Howard	Minister Assisting the Prime Minister for the Status of Women	11 March 1996	9 October 1997	1 year, 212 days
10	Judi Moylan	Liberal	Howard	Minister for the Status of Women	9 October 1997	21 October 1998	1 year, 12 days
(9)	Jocelyn Newman	Liberal	Howard	Minister Assisting the Prime Minister for the Status of Women	21 October 1998	30 January 2001	2 years, 101 days
11	Amanda Vanstone	Liberal	Howard	Minister Assisting the Prime Minister for the Status of Women	30 January 2001	7 October 2003	2 years, 250 days
12	Kay Patterson	Liberal	Howard	Minister Assisting the Prime Minister for the Status of Women	7 October 2003	26 October 2004	2 years, 112 days
12	Kay Patterson	Liberal	Howard	Minister Assisting the Prime Minister for Women's Issues	26 October 2004	27 January 2006	2 years, 112 days
13	Julie Bishop	Liberal	Howard	Minister Assisting the Prime Minister for Women's Issues	27 January 2006	3 December 2007	1 year, 310 days
14	Tanya Plibersek	Labor	Rudd	Minister for the Status of Women	3 December 2007	24 June 2010	2 years, 285 days
14	Tanya Plibersek	Labor	Gillard	Minister for the Status of Women	24 June 2010	14 September 2010	2 years, 285 days
15	Kate Ellis	Labor	Gillard	Minister for the Status of Women	15 September 2010	14 December 2011	1 year, 90 days
16	Julie Collins	Labor	Gillard	Minister for the Status of Women	14 December 2011	27 June 2013	1 year, 278 days
16	Julie Collins	Labor	Rudd	Minister for the Status of Women	27 June 2013	18 September 2013	1 year, 278 days
17	Michaelia Cash	Liberal	Abbott	Minister Assisting the Prime Minister for Women	18 September 2013	15 September 2015	4 years, 93 days
17	Michaelia Cash	Liberal	Turnbull	Minister Assisting the Prime Minister for Women	15 September 2015	21 September 2015	4 years, 93 days
17	Michaelia Cash	Liberal	Turnbull	Minister for Women	21 September 2015	20 December 2017	4 years, 93 days
18	Kelly O'Dwyer	Liberal	Turnbull	Minister for Women	20 December 2017	24 August 2018	1 year, 112 days
18	Kelly O'Dwyer	Liberal	Morrison	Minister for Women	24 August 2018	11 April 2019	1 year, 112 days
19	Marise Payne	Liberal	Morrison	Minister for Women	29 May 2019	22 May 2022	2 years, 358 days
20	Katy Gallagher	Labor	Albanese	Minister for Women	23 May 2022	Incumbent	4 years, 107 days

== Assistant ministers ==
Order	Minister	Party	Prime Minister	Title	Term start	Term end	Term in office	Ref
1	Kate Thwaites	Labor	Albanese	Assistant Minister for Women	29 July 2024	13 May 2025	288 days	
2	Rebecca White	Labor	Albanese	Assistant Minister for Women	13 May 2025	Incumbent	1 year, 117 days	
