= 1994 Liberal Party of Australia leadership spill =

Liberal Party of Australia Leadership spill, 1994
- 23 May 1994
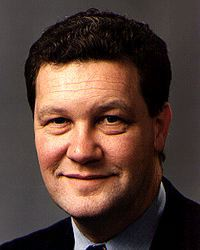

Candidate	Alexander Downer	John Hewson
Caucus vote	43	36
Percentage	54.4%	45.6%
Seat	Mayo (SA)	Wentworth (NSW)
Leader before election
John Hewson
Elected Leader
Alexander Downer

A leadership spill of the federal parliamentary leader of the Liberal Party of Australia was held on 23 May 1994. The incumbent, John Hewson, was defeated by Alexander Downer in a vote of Liberal Party Members of Parliament (MPs) by 43 votes to 36 votes. Downer thus became the Leader of the Opposition in the Parliament of Australia.

== Background ==
After John Hewson lost the so-called unlosable 1993 election, he stayed on as Leader of the Opposition despite stating he would resign if he lost. Hewson stayed on to prevent John Howard being elected leader who Hewson defeated in a 1993 leadership challenge. However, Hewson was undermined over the next 14 months amidst the Liberals having a hard time trying to fundraise and create momentum against the Keating government and after being embarrassed on Lateline about negative Liberal polling, Hewson called a leadership spill.

== Candidates ==
- Alexander Downer, Shadow Treasurer, Member for Mayo
- John Hewson, incumbent Leader, Member for Wentworth

== Potential candidates who declined to run ==
- Peter Costello, Shadow Minister for Finance, Member for Higgins
- John Howard, Shadow Minister for Industrial Relations, Member for Bennelong

== Results ==
Liberal Party of Australia deputy leadership ballot, 1994

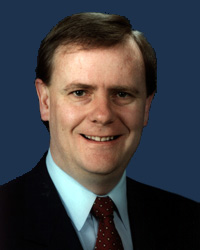

Candidate	Peter Costello	Michael Wooldridge
Vote	Unopposed	Withdrew
Seat	Higgins (Vic.)	Chisholm (Vic.)
Deputy Leader before election
Michael Wooldridge
Elected Deputy Leader
Peter Costello

The following table gives the ballot results:

Name	Votes	Percentage
Alexander Downer	43	54.4
John Hewson	36	45.6

== Aftermath ==
Michael Wooldridge was replaced as Deputy Leader by Peter Costello who became Shadow Treasurer. Downer placed Hewson in his shadow ministry as Shadow Minister for Industry, Commerce, Infrastructure, and Customs, however he was sacked after less than three months.
