= William McMahon =

Prime Minister of Australia from 1971 to 1972

The Right Honourable Sir William McMahon GCMG CH
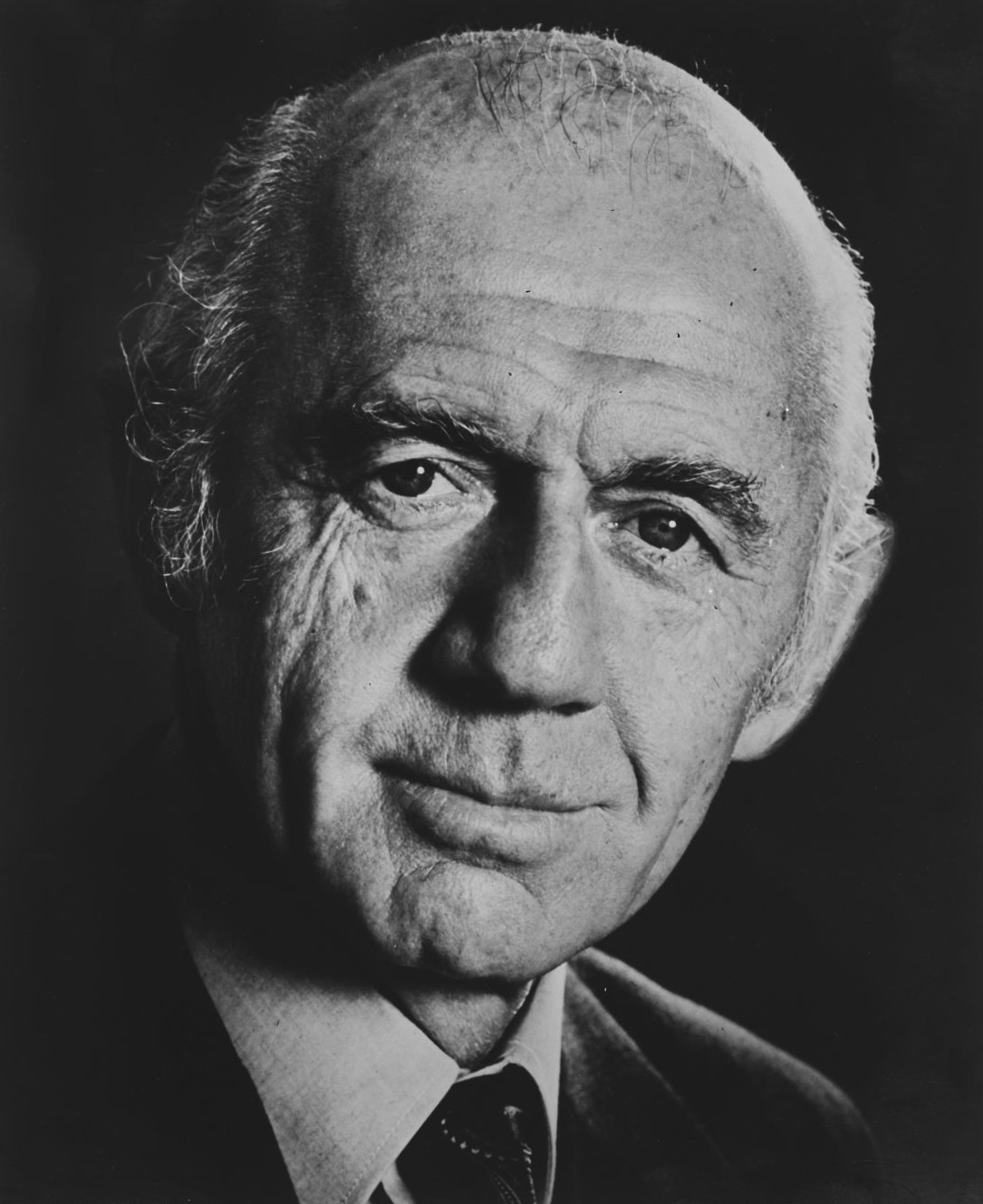
- Official portrait, 1972

20th Prime Minister of Australia
- In office 10 March 1971 – 5 December 1972
- Monarch: Elizabeth II
- Governor-General: Sir Paul Hasluck
- Deputy: Doug Anthony
- Preceded by: John Gorton
- Succeeded by: Gough Whitlam

4th Leader of the Liberal Party
- In office 10 March 1971 – 20 December 1972
- Deputy: John Gorton; Billy Snedden
- Preceded by: John Gorton
- Succeeded by: Billy Snedden

Deputy Leader of the Liberal Party
- In office 20 January 1966 – 10 March 1971
- Leader: Harold Holt; John Gorton
- Preceded by: Harold Holt
- Succeeded by: John Gorton

Minister for Foreign Affairs
- In office 12 November 1969 – 22 March 1971
- Prime Minister: John Gorton; Himself
- Preceded by: Gordon Freeth
- Succeeded by: Les Bury

Treasurer of Australia
- In office 26 January 1966 – 11 November 1969
- Prime Minister: Harold Holt; John McEwen; John Gorton
- Preceded by: Harold Holt
- Succeeded by: Les Bury

Minister for Labour and National Service
- In office 10 December 1958 – 26 January 1966
- Prime Minister: Robert Menzies
- Preceded by: Athol Townley
- Succeeded by: Hugh Robertson

Minister for Primary Industry
- In office 11 January 1956 – 10 December 1958
- Prime Minister: Robert Menzies
- Preceded by: John McEwen
- Succeeded by: Charles Adermann

Minister for Social Services
- In office 9 July 1954 – 28 February 1956
- Prime Minister: Robert Menzies
- Preceded by: Athol Townley
- Succeeded by: Hugh Robertson

Minister for the Navy Minister for Air
- In office 17 July 1951 – 9 July 1954
- Prime Minister: Robert Menzies
- Preceded by: Philip McBride
- Succeeded by: Josiah Francis (Navy); Athol Townley (Air Force)

Father of the House
- In office 20 September 1980 – 5 January 1982
- Preceded by: Clyde Cameron
- Succeeded by: Malcolm Fraser

Member of the Australian Parliament for Lowe
- In office 10 December 1949 – 4 January 1982
- Preceded by: Constituency established
- Succeeded by: Michael Maher

Personal details
- Born: 23 February 1908 Redfern, New South Wales, Australia
- Died: 31 March 1988 (aged 80) Potts Point, New South Wales, Australia
- Party: Liberal
- Spouse: Sonia Hopkins (m. 1965)
- Relations: James McMahon (grandfather); Samuel Walder (uncle)
- Children: 3, including Julian
- Education: University of Sydney
- Profession: Lawyer

Military service
- Branch/service: Australian Imperial Force
- Years of service: 1940–1945
- Rank: Major
- Unit: 6th Division
- Battles/wars: World War II

Sir William McMahon (Note: /məkˈmɑːn/ mək-MAHN) (23 February 1908 – 31 March 1988) was the 20th prime minister of Australia, serving from 1971 to 1972. He held office as the leader of the Liberal Party of Australia, and previously held various ministerial positions from 1951 to 1971, the longest continuous service in Australian history.

McMahon was born and raised in Sydney, and worked as a commercial lawyer before entering politics. He served in the Australian Army during World War II, reaching the rank of major. After the war's end he returned to university to complete an economics degree. McMahon was elected to the House of Representatives at the 1949 federal election. Robert Menzies promoted him to the ministry in 1951 and added him to cabinet in 1956. He held several different portfolios in the Menzies government, most notably as Minister for Labour and National Service from 1958 to 1966. In that capacity, he oversaw the reintroduction of conscription in 1964.

In 1966, Menzies retired and was replaced as prime minister by Harold Holt. McMahon then succeeded Holt as deputy leader of the Liberal Party. He was appointed Treasurer in the Holt government, and over the following three years oversaw a large reduction in the national deficit. After Holt's death in 1967, McMahon would have normally been the frontrunner to succeed Holt as Liberal leader and hence Prime Minister. However, he had his candidacy vetoed by John McEwen, the leader of the Liberals' junior partner, the Country Party. The new prime minister was John Gorton. McMahon initially continued on as Treasurer in the Gorton government, but in 1969 was demoted to Minister for External Affairs after an unsuccessful challenge for the leadership. He eventually replaced Gorton in March 1971 following Gorton's resignation, winning a vote against Billy Snedden.

McMahon became prime minister at the age of 63, and remains the oldest non-interim prime minister to take office. His government has been described by the Australian Dictionary of Biography as "a blend of cautious innovation and fundamental orthodoxy". It continued many of the policies of its immediate predecessors, such as the phased withdrawal of Australian troops from Vietnam. In its final year it faced high inflation and unemployment. Gough Whitlam's Labor Party defeated McMahon at the 1972 federal election, ending 23 consecutive years of Coalition rule. No other Australian prime minister has served for longer without winning a general election. He resigned the Liberal leadership, but remained in parliament until 1982 as a backbencher.

McMahon has been described as one of Australia's worst prime ministers by Australian political scientists and historians, and after leaving office several of his former colleagues openly criticised his leadership style and personal character. Whitlam, his successor, acknowledged him as "an extraordinarily skilful, resourceful and tenacious politician", and credited him with having prevented a larger margin of defeat in 1972.

== Early life ==
=== Birth and family background ===
McMahon was born in Redfern, Sydney, New South Wales, on 23 February 1908. He was the third of five children born to solicitor William Daniel McMahon and Mary (née Walder), daughter of a sailmaker; an older brother predeceased him. His father, a Catholic, had a reputation as a heavy drinker and habitual gambler; his mother, an Anglican, was of Irish and English descent.

McMahon's paternal grandfather, James "Butty" McMahon, was born in County Clare, Munster, Ireland, and married Mary Coyle of County Fermanagh, Ulster, Ireland. He arrived in Australia as a child, and eventually founded his own freight company, which became one of the largest in Sydney. Upon his death in 1914, his estate was valued at almost £240,000, an immense sum at the time. (Note: £240,000 in 1914 equates to about A$25.5 million in purchasing power as of 2018, according to the MeasuringWorth comparison tool.)

=== Childhood and education ===
McMahon spent his early life in Redfern. His mother died in 1917, when he was nine years old, and he was subsequently raised by her relatives. He moved home frequently as he was shifted between family members, living for periods in Kensington, Beecroft, Gordon, and Centennial Park. McMahon saw little of his father or his siblings, who were raised separately; his older brother James died of Spanish flu in 1919. His uncle Samuel Walder – a businessman who was Lord Mayor of Sydney in 1932 – acted as a sort of surrogate father. McMahon began his education at Abbotsholme College, a short-lived private school in Killara. One of his schoolmates there was Harold Holt, another future prime minister. He was later sent to Sydney Grammar School, where he was an above-average student without excelling academically.

McMahon's father died in 1926, when his son was 18 years old, leaving him a substantial inheritance. He had failed the leaving certificate at Sydney Grammar, but by his passing a matriculation exam was able to enter the University of Sydney in 1927. At the insistence of Walder, he chose to study law, graduating with a Bachelor of Laws in 1930. McMahon, who lived at St Paul's College, was more interested in the social scene than his degree. He spent his inheritance freely, owning several racehorses, and was known for betting significant amounts on the races. According to Alan Reid, "his reputation was that he completed his university career on less actual work than anyone in the college".

Despite his diminutive physique – he stood 5 feet 7 inches (170 cm) as an adult – McMahon did achieve some success as an athlete. He won his university's lightweight boxing title, and in his final year at Sydney Grammar rowed in the Head of the River race.

=== Legal career and military service ===
According to Don Whitington, McMahon's life before entering politics was "the aimless, indolent existence of a wealthy young man with a position in a big city's smart set, no positive ambition or even interests, except in enjoying himself, and no family ties to give him a feeling of responsibility or even consideration for others". After graduating from university, he secured a position as a solicitor with Allen, Allen & Hemsley, a major Sydney law firm; he was made a junior partner in 1939. He was assigned to the Commonwealth Bank and the Bank of New South Wales for periods, which helped spark his interest in economics. McMahon had hoped to practise as a barrister, but his partial deafness made this impractical. His hearing remained an issue throughout his life, making parliamentary debates hard to follow, but did improve somewhat through surgery and the use of hearing aids.

In April 1940, McMahon was commissioned as a lieutenant in the Citizens Military Force. He transferred to the Australian Imperial Force (the regular army) in October 1940, and was promoted to captain in 1942 and to major in 1943. McMahon was turned down for overseas service due to his hearing loss and a knee injury. In the early part of the war he was attached to coastal defence units in Sydney. He later served on the headquarters staff of the II Corps (1942–1943) and the Second Army (1943–1945). He was formally discharged in October 1945.

After leaving the military, McMahon travelled overseas for 18 months, visiting Europe and North America. His experience of post-war Europe was said to have been one of the primary influences on his subsequent decision to enter politics. In 1947, McMahon returned to the University of Sydney to study economics and public administration. He graduated with a Bachelor of Economics degree in 1948, completing the course two years early due to his previous studies. He topped his economics class and won two prizes for proficiency in his final year.

== Politics ==
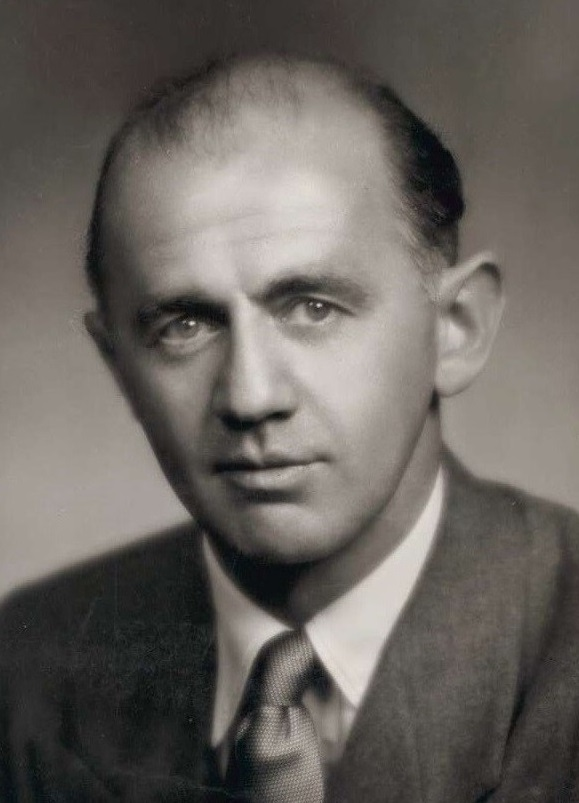
McMahon in 1950, as a newly elected backbencher

=== Menzies government ===
McMahon was elected to the House of Representatives at the 1949 federal election, winning the newly created Division of Lowe for the Liberal Party. His candidacy was endorsed by Billy Hughes, who had known his grandfather. McMahon soon developed a reputation as "a deadly earnest, dogged, enormously hardworking and dedicated member". In 1950, he successfully proposed an amendment to the Menzies government's Communist Party Dissolution Bill, reversing the effect of a clause so that the burden of proof was on the government rather than an accused person. However, the bill was subsequently struck down by the High Court. In July 1951, McMahon replaced Philip McBride as Minister for the Navy and Minister for Air. He subsequently approved and oversaw Donald Hardman's proposal to reorganise the Royal Australian Air Force (RAAF) along functional command lines (rather than the previous area command system).

After the 1954 election, McMahon was appointed Minister for Social Services in place of Athol Townley. In January 1956, he was instead made Minister for Primary Industry, an appointment that was seen as a surprise given his lack of experience in agriculture. He effectively became the junior minister to John McEwen, the deputy leader of the Country Party and Minister for Trade. It was hoped by the Country Party (and tacitly accepted by Menzies) that McMahon would simply be a proxy for McEwen on policy matters. However, he managed to preserve the influence and independence of his department, and in fact made a number of cabinet submissions that were contrary to McEwen's wishes. This impressed his colleagues in the Liberal Party, but laid the foundations for the poor relations with the Country Party that would prove challenging later in his career.

McMahon was promoted to Minister for Labour and National Service after the 1958 election, in place of Harold Holt. This brought him firmly into the inner ranks of the Liberal Party, and in terms of cabinet rank placed him among the party's most senior figures in New South Wales. McMahon oversaw the creation and administration of what became the National Service Act 1964, which re-introduced compulsory conscription for 20-year-old males in anticipation of further Australian involvement in South-East Asia. On the labour side of his portfolio, he frequently came into conflict with the leadership of the Australian Council of Trade Unions (ACTU), though there was no major industrial action during his tenure. He attempted to reduce the influence of trade unions known to be controlled by the Communist Party, particularly the Waterside Workers' Federation. In 1964, McMahon was made Vice-President of the Executive Council, further confirming his status within the government.

=== Holt government: treasurer and deputy leader ===
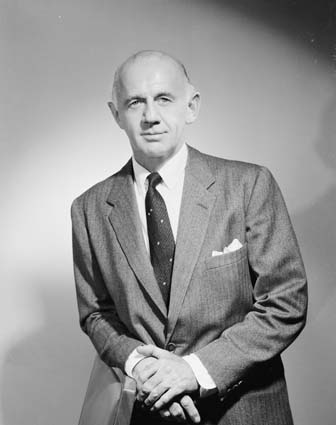
McMahon in 1963

In January 1966, following Menzies' retirement, Harold Holt was elected unopposed as Liberal leader and prime minister. McMahon narrowly defeated external affairs minister Paul Hasluck to replace Holt as deputy leader, following multiple ballots.

McMahon was appointed federal treasurer in Holt's new ministry, a position he had long sought. He was the first person with an economics degree to hold the post. McMahon proclaimed a "very deep liking and respect" for the Department of the Treasury and upheld its advice in policy battles with McEwen's Department of Trade and Industry. According to Alan Reid, he "fought relentlessly to maintain Treasury's influence, prestige and power". Although he consulted widely within his department, he also had a reputation for indecisiveness and deferring difficult decisions. the early retirement of long-serving Treasury secretary Roland Wilson in October 1966 was credited in part to his dislike of McMahon.

As treasurer, McMahon oversaw the implementation of Australia's conversion to decimal currency (a decision of the previous government), with the Australian dollar introduced in February 1966 in place of the Australian pound. A year later he announced that the transition had cost half as much as estimated and that the period of dual currencies would be shortened, with the dollar being the only legal tender from August 1967. In November 1967, McMahon secured cabinet approval for Australia to leave the sterling area, by refusing to match the British government's devaluation of the pound sterling. The decision brought him into renewed conflict with McEwen, who had been out of the country when it was taken and sought to secure its reversal. There was further conflict over McEwen's proposal for a government-owned Australian Industry Development Corporation, which McMahon and Treasury sought to counter with a proposal for a privately owned Australian Resources Development Bank.

=== Gorton government: treasurer and foreign minister ===
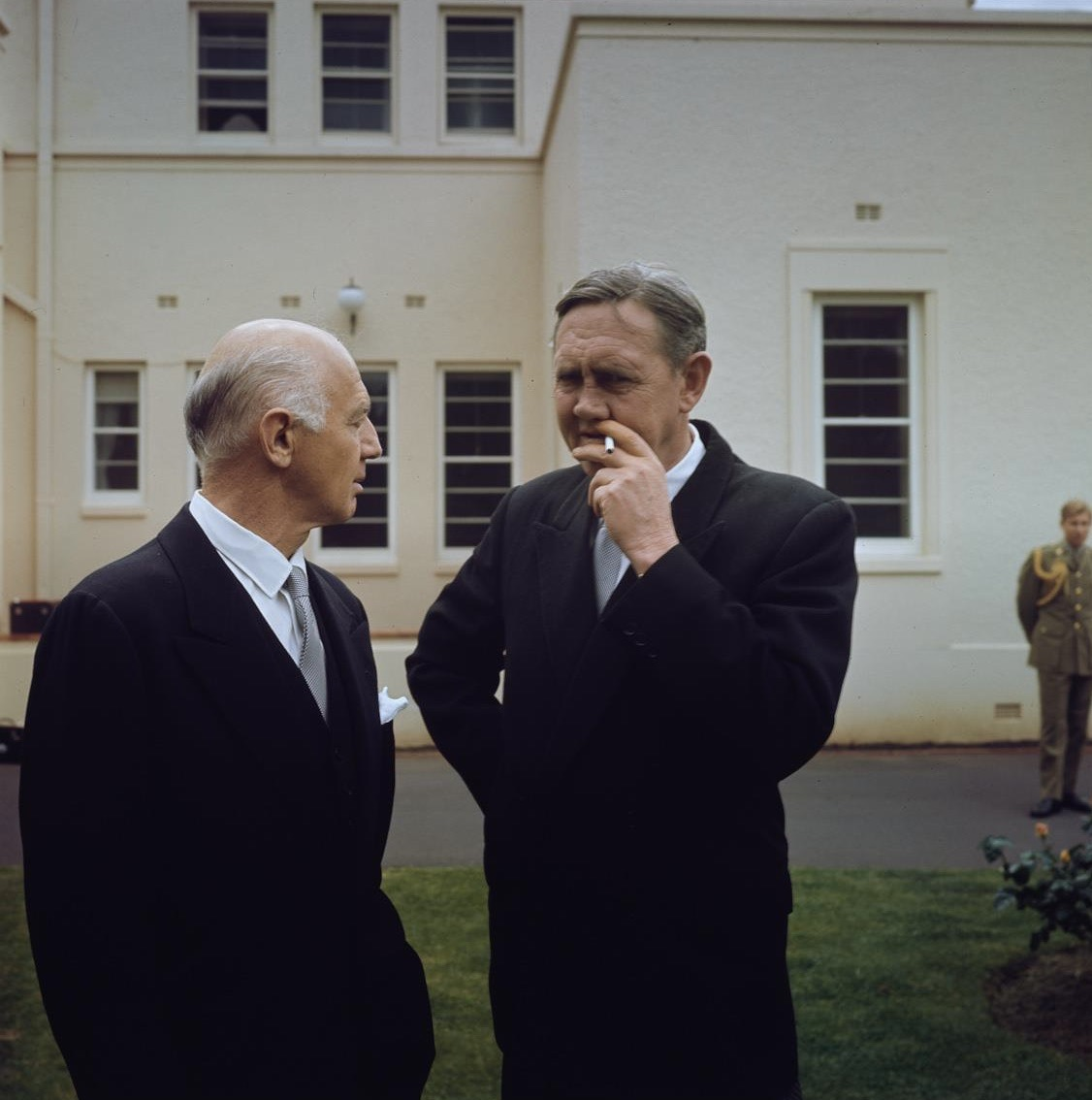
McMahon with Prime Minister John Gorton shortly after McMahon's unsuccessful leadership challenge in 1969

When Holt disappeared in December 1967, McMahon was assumed to be his probable successor. However, John McEwen, interim prime minister and leader of the Country Party, announced that he and his party would not serve in a government led by McMahon. McEwen did not state his reasons publicly, but privately he told McMahon he did not trust him. McEwen, an arch-protectionist, correctly suspected that McMahon favoured policies of free trade and deregulation.

McMahon therefore withdrew, and Senator John Gorton won the subsequent party room ballot for party leader and therefore Prime Minister. McMahon remained Treasurer and waited for his chance at a comeback. The Coalition was nearly defeated at the 1969 federal election. After the election, McMahon unsuccessfully challenged for the leadership, but was nonetheless re-elected as deputy leader. He was subsequently demoted from Treasurer to Minister for External Affairs. John McEwen had announced in the lead-up to the spill that he would lift his party's veto on McMahon as prime minister.

In March 1971, the defence minister, Malcolm Fraser, resigned from Cabinet and denounced Gorton, who then announced a leadership spill. The ensuing party room vote was tied, and under the party rules of the time this meant the motion was lost and Gorton could have theoretically remained as leader and prime minister. Nevertheless, Gorton declared that a tie vote meant he no longer had the confidence of the party, and voluntarily resigned the leadership. McMahon was then elected leader (and thus prime minister), and Gorton was elected deputy leader.

== Prime Minister (1971–1972) ==
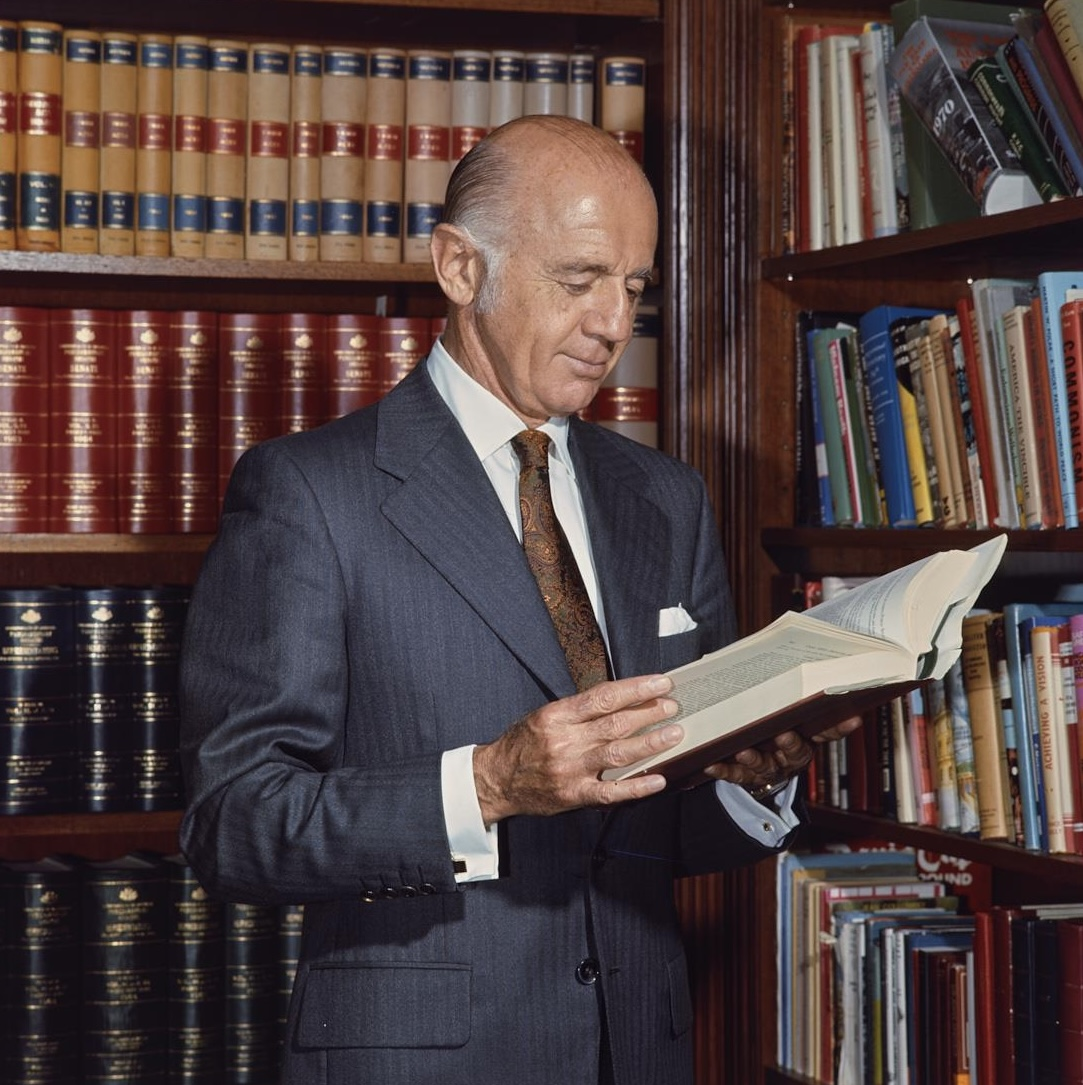
McMahon in 1971

McMahon came into office at a bad time for the Coalition, which was increasingly seen as tired and unfocused after more than 21 years in power. His first problem was Gorton. Since Gorton had been elected as Liberal deputy leader, McMahon was all but forced to name him Defence Minister. This farcical situation came to a head when Gorton published two articles detailing the problems he had with ministers leaking information from cabinet. McMahon forced Gorton's resignation. Billy Snedden was chosen as the new deputy Liberal leader.

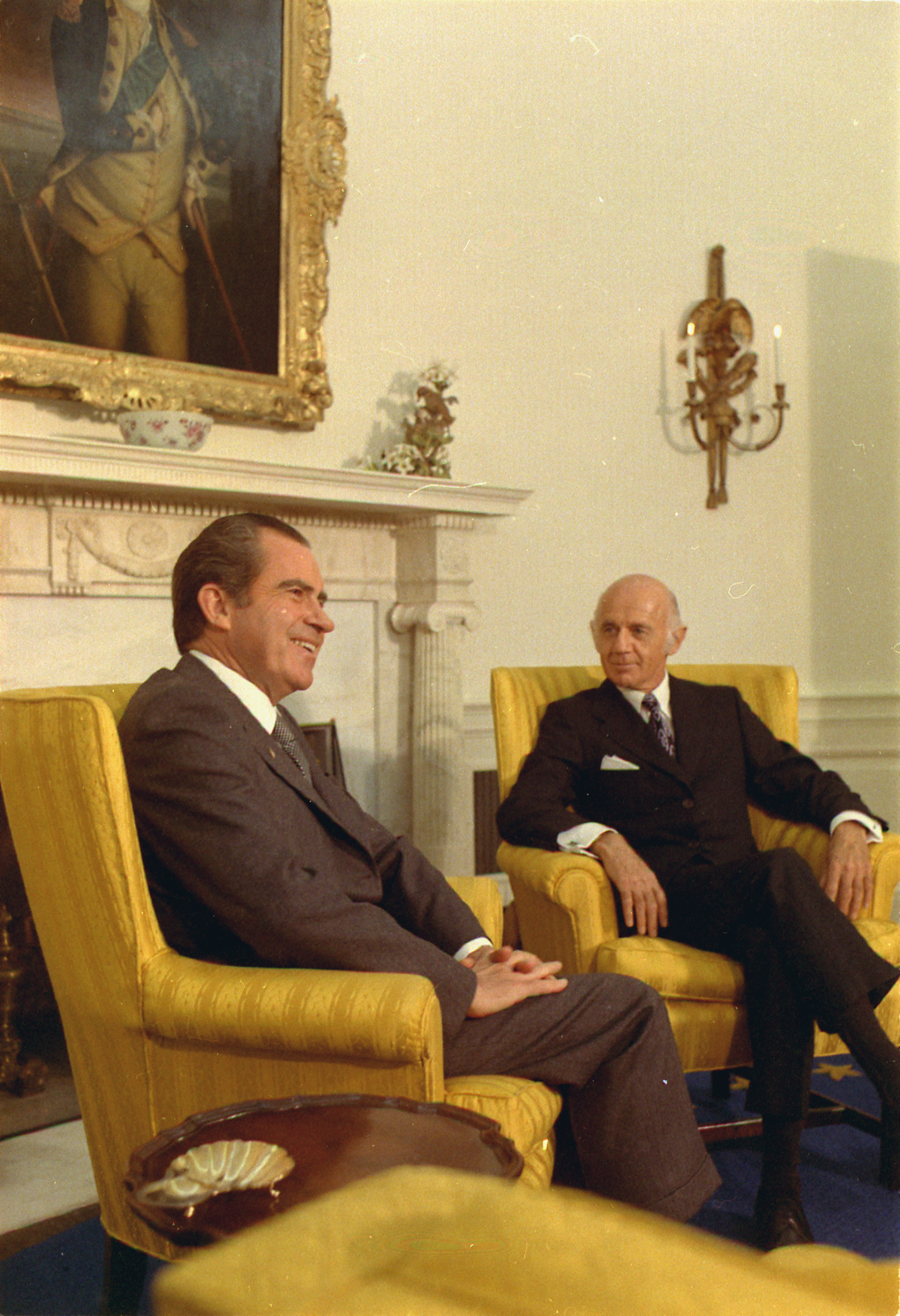
McMahon visiting US President Richard Nixon at the White House in 1971

McMahon found himself dealing with a resurgent Labor Party under Gough Whitlam. Labor had come within four seats of winning government in 1969, and since then had positioned itself as a credible government-in-waiting. Over the next year-and-a-half, McMahon was unable to get the better of Whitlam. McMahon was no match in parliamentary debates for Whitlam, a witty and powerful orator. He frequently found himself on the defensive as Whitlam attacked the increasingly unpopular Vietnam War and advocated radical new policies such as universal health insurance. In a typical instance, McMahon attacked Whitlam for his demands that Australia recognise the People's Republic of China, only to have to back down when U.S President Richard Nixon announced his visit to China. He was not helped by rising inflation, which hurt his reputation as a sound economic manager. Additionally, the Liberal Party was showing severe schisms, which came at an especially bad time since McMahon had, at most, two years before the next election. His voice and appearance also came across badly on television.

In June 1971, McMahon cancelled Gorton's planned nuclear power program, which had included a reactor capable of generating weapons-grade plutonium. He considered it inconsistent with the goals of the Nuclear Non-Proliferation Treaty, signed under Gorton in 1970 and ratified under Whitlam in 1973.

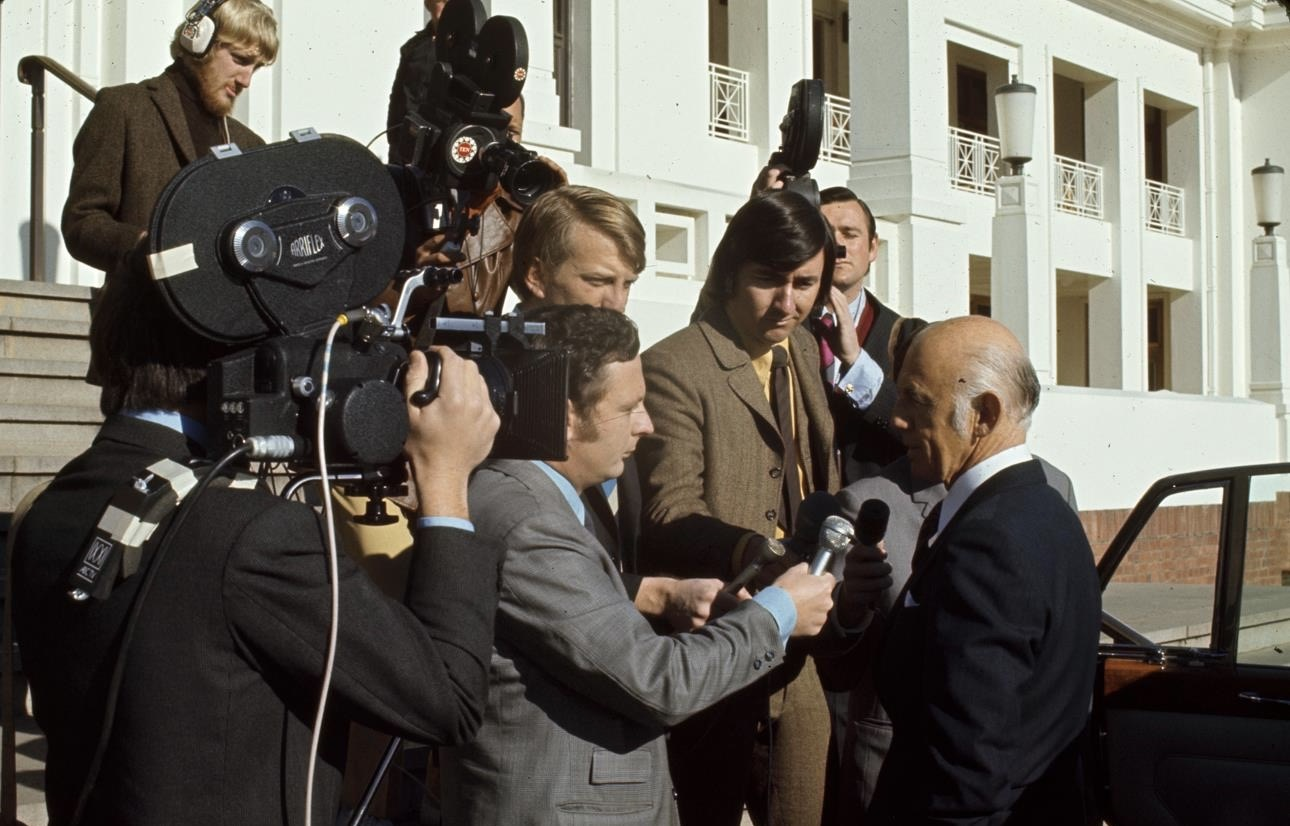
McMahon confronted by reporters in 1972

McMahon went into 1972 facing a statutory general election. By then, Labor had established a clear lead in the polls and McMahon's approval ratings had dwindled to 28 percent. The press had turned on him so violently that the British psephologist David Butler recalled on a visit to Australia that he could not recall a prime minister in any country being "so comprehensively panned" as McMahon. By then, it was widely perceived that McMahon simply "did not look or sound like a Prime Minister". He waited for as long as he could, but finally called a federal election for 2 December. During the campaign, McMahon was abandoned by some of his own ministers, unheard of in a Westminster system. The Coalition was swept from power on an eight-seat swing. Late on election night, with the result beyond doubt, McMahon conceded defeat, ending the longest unbroken run in government in Australian history.

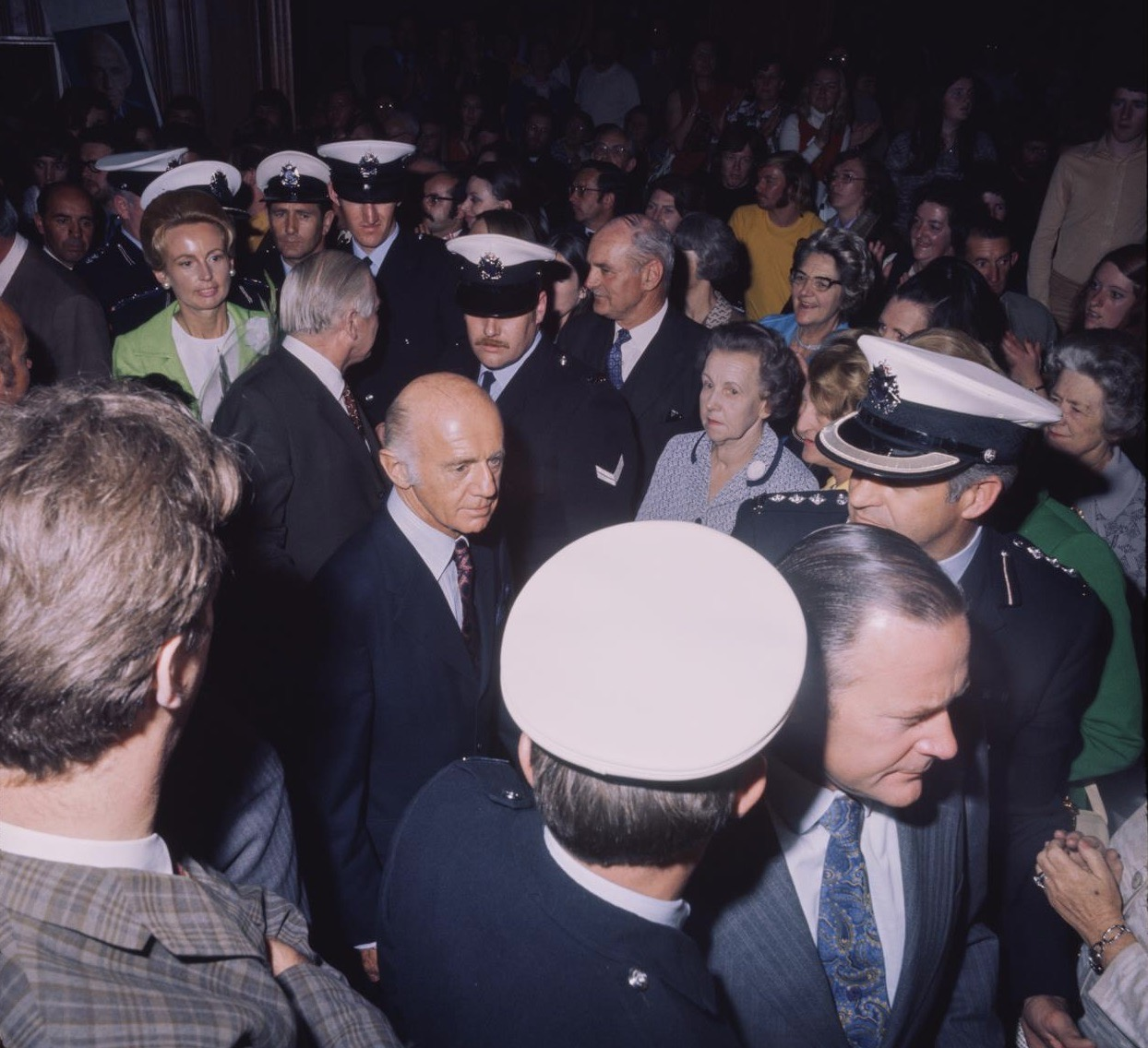
McMahon at a campaign rally in Springvale, Victoria during the 1972 federal election

McMahon had been a minister continuously for 21 years and 6 months, a record in the Australian Government that has never been threatened. Only Sir George Pearce and Sir John McEwen had longer overall ministerial service, but their terms were not continuous.

== Later parliamentary career (1972–1982) ==
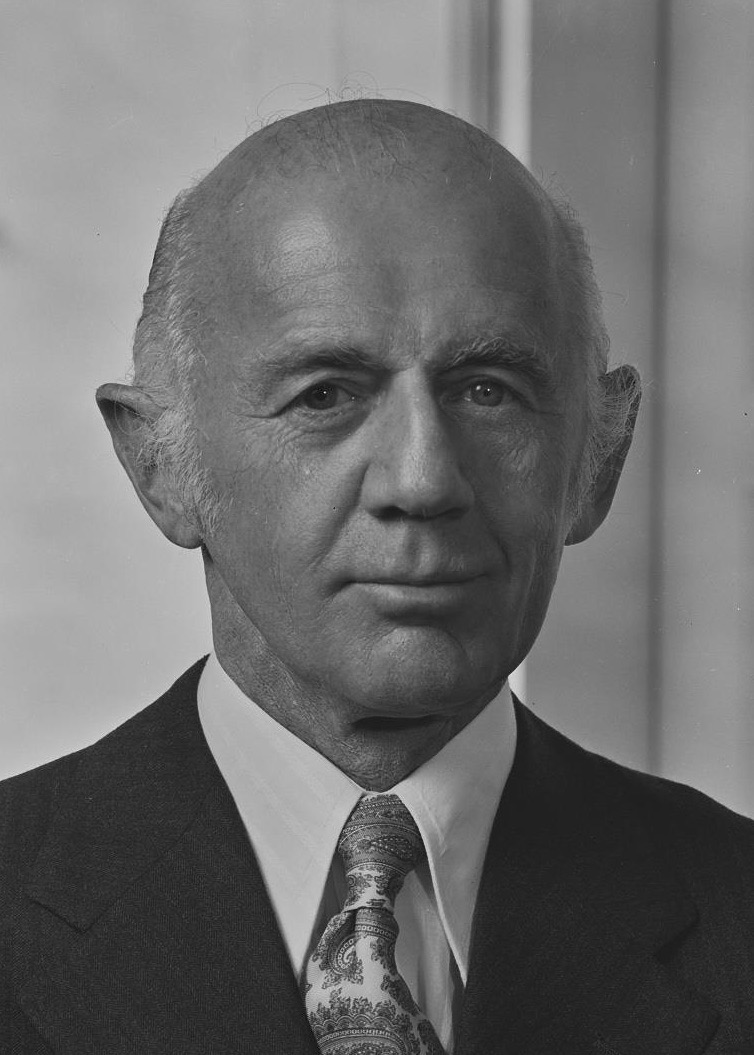
Official portrait, 1973

McMahon's term as prime minister ended on 5 December 1972. He did not immediately resign as Liberal leader, but it soon became clear that there was no support for him to continue.

McMahon became the first prime minister to have lost an election and retained his seat who did not then serve as Leader of the Opposition.

On 20 December, the Liberal Party elected Billy Snedden as his successor. As a mark of respect for his past service, McMahon was included in Snedden's new shadow cabinet (as was John Gorton). However, at his own request he was not allocated a specific portfolio. In an interview with HSV7 in June 1973, McMahon stated that "disloyalty within our own party" was the main reason the Liberals had lost the election. He also said that he had three regrets from his time as prime minister – that he failed to abolish national service, that he had mishandled the 1971 budget, and that he had been a poor communicator.

After the 1974 election, McMahon returned to the backbench for the first time since 1951. In the lead-up to the dismissal of the Whitlam government in 1975, he strongly defended the power of the Senate to block supply. However, he believed that Governor-general John Kerr had acted unconstitutionally in dismissing the prime minister, and said that he would have challenged the decision in the High Court if he had been in Whitlam's position. McMahon believed that those responsible for the "loans affair" – including Whitlam and several of his ministers – had acted illegally and should be prosecuted for their involvement. He assisted Danny Sankey (a private citizen) in bringing a private prosecution against Whitlam, which eventually came before the High Court as Sankey v Whitlam. Malcolm Fraser had promised Kerr that his government would bring no action against its predecessor, and was frustrated by McMahon's actions. In his memoirs, he said: "I knew McMahon was running around up to his tricks ... I couldn't control what he did, but I could make damn sure that the government, my government, did not get involved".

Prior to the 1977 election, McMahon was unsuccessfully challenged for Liberal preselection by John Abel, whose Division of Evans had been abolished in an electoral redistribution. After being re-elected, he became the joint Father of the House of Representatives with Clyde Cameron. He was the sole Father of the House after the 1980 election, winning election for a fourteenth and final time at the age of 72. In his final years in parliament he was often critical of the Fraser government. McMahon left parliament after 32 years in January 1982, citing dissatisfaction with the 1981 budget as a major factor in his decision to retire before a general election. He nominated future prime minister Malcolm Turnbull as his preferred successor in Lowe, but the Liberal Party chose another candidate Philip Taylor. The by-election was won by the Labor Party on a 9.4-point swing.

He was the last former prime minister to be reelected to Parliament until Kevin Rudd in 2010.

== Final years and death ==
In retirement, McMahon devoted much of his time to working on his memoirs, which he planned to title A Liberal View. They were rejected by six publishers, and reviewers (who included Barry Jones and Phillip Adams) considered them to be poorly written and overly detailed. In 1984, McMahon endorsed Bob Hawke and the Labor Party for re-election over the Coalition, which he said would not be ready for government for another four or five years. Later that year, he described Andrew Peacock's hold on the Liberal leadership as "very, very fragile", and tacitly endorsed John Howard as a future leader.

In his final years, McMahon underwent a series of operations related to skin cancer. He died aged 80 in his sleep at St Luke's Private Hospital, Potts Point, on the morning of 31 March 1988. His remains were cremated at the Northern Suburbs Crematorium. A state memorial service was held at St Andrew's Cathedral, Sydney, on 8 April, with the eulogy given by David Fairbairn.

== Personal life ==
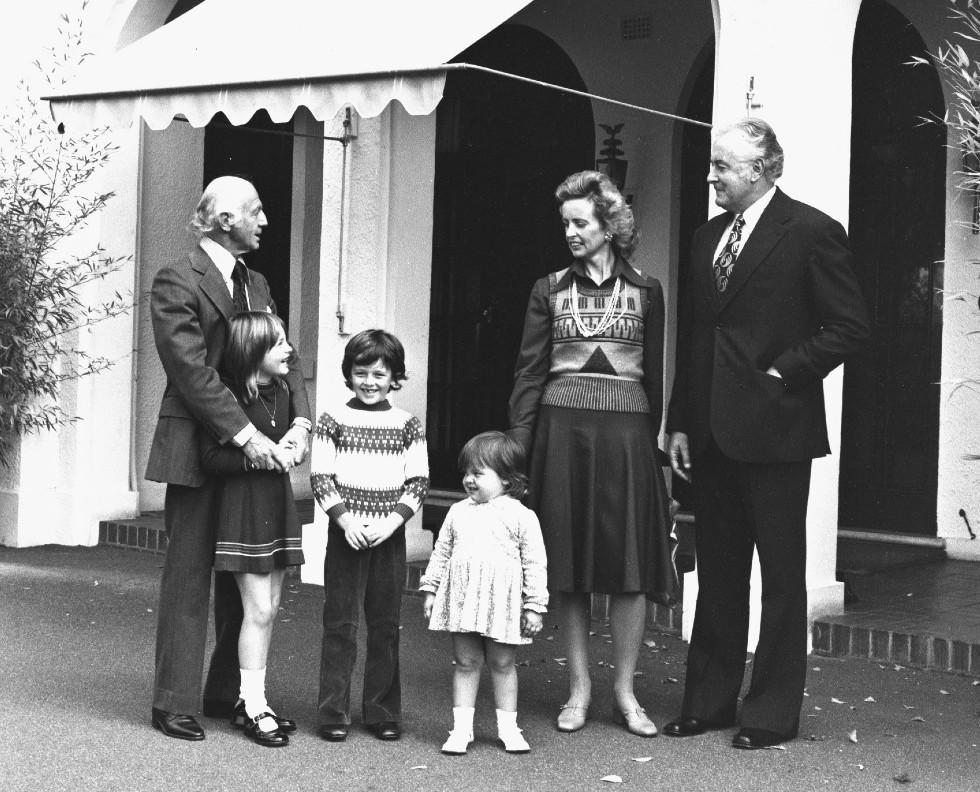
McMahon with his wife and children visiting Prime Minister Gough Whitlam at The Lodge in 1975

In 1965, aged 57, McMahon married Sonia Rachel Hopkins, who was then aged 32. McMahon had proposed six months after the pair first met. The wedding was held three months later at St Mark's Church, Darling Point, followed by a reception for 400 people at the Royal Sydney Golf Club. She survived him by more than twenty years, dying on 2 April 2010, aged 77. The couple had three children, one of whom was the actor Julian McMahon.

There were frequent rumours throughout his life that McMahon was homosexual. The suggestion was repeatedly denied by Lady McMahon. On one occasion in the 1970s, that resulted in an infamous headline in the defunct Melbourne tabloid, Sunday Observer: "My Billy's No Poofter – Sonia Tells".

In the 1972 election, David Widdup, a pioneer of LGBTQ+ rights in Australia, ran as a candidate against McMahon in the seat of Lowe, making history as Australia's first openly gay candidate for public office. His campaign slogan, “I’ve got my eyes on Billy’s seat!”, garnered significant media attention, particularly given the rumours about McMahon’s sexuality.

=== Religion ===
McMahon was an Anglican, although he did not have a strong religious upbringing. His father was a lapsed Catholic and self-described "rationalist", while his mother's family were Anglican. McMahon developed an interest in theology as a teenager, and read widely on the subject over the rest of his life. He cited the works of William Temple as a major influence. McMahon was one of the few contemporary politicians to speak publicly on the connection between their religious and political beliefs. In 1953, he gave an address to the Australian Institute of Political Science in which he explained how he believed Christian doctrines necessitated parliamentary democracy and a market economy.

== Evaluation ==
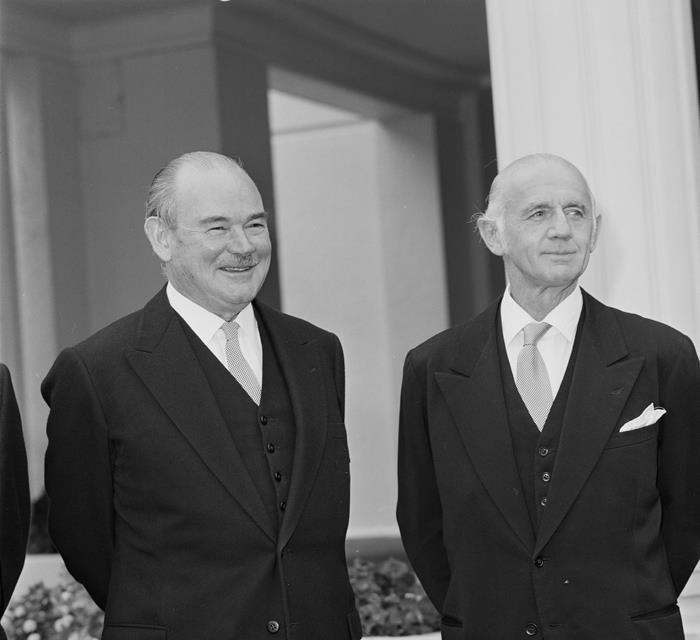
McMahon with Governor-General Sir Paul Hasluck in March 1971. Hasluck would go on to become one of the most vociferous critics of McMahon

McMahon is often ranked among Australia's worst prime ministers. In 2001, five out of six historians surveyed by Australian Financial Review ranked him among their worst five prime ministers. Similarly, The Age surveyed eight historians in 2004 and all but one ranked McMahon as Australia's worst prime minister since World War II. Some of McMahon's most prominent critics have been those who served with him in cabinet. John Gorton called him "utterly untrustworthy", while Doug Anthony said he was "just not big enough for the job". Malcolm Fraser said he "had an insatiable ambition [...] he wasn't immoral, he was totally amoral". Billy Snedden considered McMahon "conspiratorial, devious, untrustworthy", and Paul Hasluck viewed him as "disloyal, devious, dishonest, untrustworthy, petty, cowardly", in his diaries referring to him as "that treacherous bastard".

McMahon was nicknamed "Billy the Leak" for his willingness to divulge intimate and confidential information to the media. Despite this, he was disliked by many journalists and political commentators. Donald Horne called him "perhaps the silliest prime minister we ever had", and Peter Ryan said that "McMahon's way of politics was one of lying and leaking, conniving and conspiring, deceit and double-crossing". Malcolm Mackerras thought that he had "no achievements beyond actually getting the top job". Political journalist Laurie Oakes described McMahon as "devious, nasty, dishonest - he lied all the time and stole things" before describing an incident where McMahon attempted to steal a tape recorder from his radio station by claiming ownership of the device despite it having the radio station's name engraved on it. He concludes by saying that McMahon was a "totally unworthy individual and the fact that he was Prime Minister of this country was a disgrace".

Some writers have defended McMahon's reputation, arguing that he was a skilled politician who has been unfairly scapegoated for an almost inevitable election loss. According to John Hawkins, McMahon was "grudgingly admired for his energy and diligence", and generally acknowledged as having a mastery of economic policy. Mungo MacCallum, while noting that he left no lasting achievements, called his prime ministership a "brief but cheerful interlude" and praised him for leaving office with good grace. Marian Simms compared McMahon to Richard Nixon, suggesting that his character traits have been overemphasised, while Troy Bramston viewed him as "a prime minister who clearly understood the challenge of the times and was fighting to get his ship back on course" when he was forced out of office. Andrew Peacock, who served in McMahon's ministry, said that McMahon was "much better than he has been painted... He is somewhat ill-treated by history", and described him as "difficult, irascible, nervous yet capable". In his memoirs, Gough Whitlam wrote that McMahon was "an extraordinarily skilful, resourceful and tenacious politician ... had he been otherwise, the ALP victory in December 1972 would have been more convincing than it was".

== Honours ==
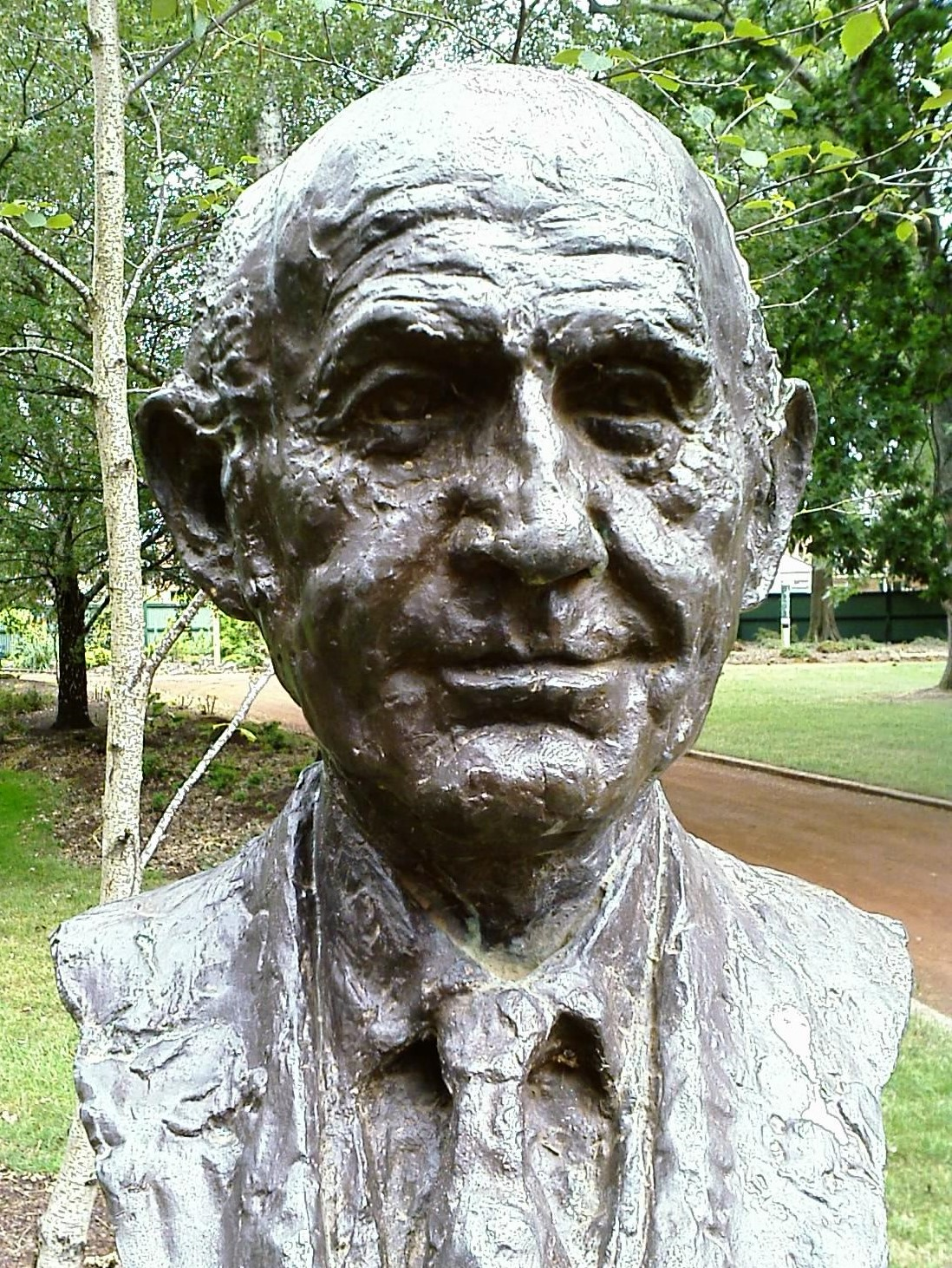
Bust of McMahon by sculptor Victor Greenhalgh located in the Prime Minister's Avenue in the Ballarat Botanical Gardens

McMahon was appointed a Privy Counsellor in 1966, a Member of the Order of the Companions of Honour in the 1972 New Year Honours, and a Knight Grand Cross of the Order of St Michael and St George in the Queen's Birthday Honours of 1977.

Following the 2009 redistribution of New South Wales federal electorates, the Division of Prospect was renamed the Division of McMahon starting at the 2010 federal election.

== See also ==
- McMahon Ministry

== Notes ==
Parliament of Australia
New division	Member for Lowe; 1949–1982	Succeeded by Michael Maher
Preceded by Kim Beazley Sr. Clyde Cameron	Father of the House of Representatives; 1980–1982	Succeeded by Malcolm Fraser; Billy Snedden; Sir James Killen
Political offices
Preceded by Philip McBride	Minister for Air; 1951–1954	Succeeded by Athol Townley
Preceded by Philip McBride	Minister for the Navy; 1951–1954	Succeeded by Josiah Francis
Preceded by Athol Townley	Minister for Social Services; 1954–1956	Succeeded by Hugh Roberton
Preceded by John McEwen	Minister for Primary Industry; 1956–1958	Succeeded by Charles Adermann
Preceded by Harold Holt	Minister for Labour and National Service; 1958–1966	Succeeded by Les Bury
Preceded by Bill Spooner	Vice-President of the Executive Council; 1964–1966	Succeeded by Alan Hulme
Preceded by Harold Holt	Treasurer of Australia; 1966–1969	Succeeded by Les Bury
Preceded by Gordon Freeth	Minister for External Affairs/ Minister for Foreign Affairs; 1969–1971	Succeeded by Les Bury
Preceded by John Gorton	Prime Minister of Australia; 1971–1972	Succeeded by Gough Whitlam
Party political offices
Preceded by Harold Holt	Deputy Leader of the Liberal Party of Australia; 1966–1971	Succeeded by John Gorton
Preceded by John Gorton	Leader of the Liberal Party of Australia; 1971–1972	Succeeded by Billy Snedden
