= James McMahon (businessman) =

Australian businessman

- Born: 31 May 1838; County Clare, Ireland, United Kingdom
- Died: 17 November 1914 (aged 76); Redfern, New South Wales, Australia
- Occupation: Businessman
- Spouse: Mary Coyle (m. 1864)
- Relatives: William McMahon (grandson); Julian McMahon (great-grandson)

James "Butty" McMahon (31 May 1838 – 17 November 1914) was an Australian businessman. He was a significant figure in Sydney's freight industry in the late 19th and early 20th centuries.

== Early life ==
McMahon was born on 31 May 1838 in County Clare, Ireland. He was the oldest son of Catherine (née Cunningham) and John McMahon, who worked as a labourer and carter. The family immigrated to Australia when he was nine years old, during the Great Famine. McMahon had "little education, if any". He began working as a baker's assistant at the age of 13, receiving seven shillings per week, and later worked for a wine and spirit merchant.

== Business career ==
McMahon became involved in Sydney's freight industry as a young man (then known as "carriers"), spending six years with Patrick Murphy and then two years with J. P. Elliot & Co. at Woolloomooloo. He subsequently launched his own business as a young man by "buying a horse and harness and renting a dilapidated dray".

In the early 1860s McMahon obtained a contract to carry copper ore from Peak Downs, Queensland, to the port at St Lawrence. In 1864 he was awarded an exclusive contract with New South Wales Government Railways to deliver wool from the Darling Harbour Yard to the portside warehouses. By the time of his death 50 years later he was said to be transporting 750,000 bales of wool per year, owning 550 horses and employing over 250 men.

McMahon served as the inaugural president of the Master Carriers' Association of New South Wales from 1890 to 1892 and served a second term from 1900 to 1911. He had a reputation for violence and during the 1890 Australian maritime dispute reportedly assaulted three striking employees. He was then picketed by the Trolley, Draymen and Carters' Union and Wharf Labourers' Union and assaulted one of the picketers by striking him on the head with a stave. His nickname "Butty" was allegedly earned by his "propensity to settle disputes by head-butting his antagonists".

McMahon's business success allowed him to acquire extensive real estate holdings in Sydney as well as pastoral lands. He owned land at Mount Druitt and grazing properties at Molong and Bumbaldry (near Cowra). In the city he built cottages to rent to his drivers and owned pubs near his yards, with the aim of recouping some of their wages.

McMahon's estate was sworn for probate at £236,325 (equivalent to $31,370,000 in 2022); however, he reputedly had a net worth of £1 million (equivalent to $132,700,000 in 2022). Two years after his death, his widow paid for the construction of a family vault at Rookwood Cemetery.

== Personal life ==
McMahon married Mary Coyle, a housemaid born in County Fermanagh, Ireland, on 6 June 1864. The couple had six sons and one daughter, all of whom were employed in the family business. Their son James Patrick McMahon served on the Sydney City Council and was president of the NRMA, and their grandson William McMahon later served as prime minister of Australia from 1971 to 1972.
