= Peter Baldwin (politician) =

Australian politician (born 1951)

The Honourable Peter Baldwin

Minister for Social Security
- In office 24 March 1993 – 11 March 1996
- Prime Minister: Paul Keating
- Preceded by: Neal Blewett
- Succeeded by: Jocelyn Newman

Member of the Australian Parliament for Sydney
- In office 5 March 1983 – 31 August 1998
- Preceded by: Les McMahon
- Succeeded by: Tanya Plibersek

Member of the New South Wales Legislative Council
- In office 23 April 1976 – 18 August 1982

Personal details
- Born: 12 April 1951 (age 75) Aldershot, England
- Party: Labor
- Education: University of Sydney; Macquarie University
- Occupation: Activist

Peter Jeremy Baldwin (born 12 April 1951) is a former Australian politician. He was a member of the House of Representatives from 1983 to 1998, representing the seat of Sydney for the Australian Labor Party (ALP). He served as Minister for Social Security in the Keating government from 1993 to 1996. He was previously a member of the New South Wales Legislative Council from 1976 to 1982.

== Early life ==
Baldwin was born in Aldershot, England. His family moved to Australia in 1958. He attended Normanhurst Boys High School in Sydney, and later received a Bachelor of Electrical Engineering from the University of Sydney and a Bachelor of Arts from Macquarie University.

== State politics ==
Baldwin was a member of the New South Wales Legislative Council from 1976 to 1982. In the 1970s he was prominent as a left-wing activist in the Australian Labor Party (ALP).

In the early morning hours of 17 July 1980, Baldwin was assaulted at his home in the nearby Sydney suburb of Marrickville. Pictures of his battered face dominated the front pages of newspapers around the nation, and led to increased pressure for reform of the party. Baldwin claimed that his assault was the result of his efforts to expose fraud and corruption among right-wing Labor members in the inner Sydney area, and Labor officials said they believed they knew the identity of one of Baldwin's attackers.

Although nobody was ever charged with the assault, an article from The Sydney Morning Herald in 2005 claimed that the assault was undertaken by underworld figure Tom Domican acting on suggestions from then-Labor state secretary Graham Richardson. In March 2007, Richardson won a settlement against Fairfax Media of $50,000 for defamation.

== Federal politics ==
After leaving state politics, Baldwin was selected for the federal Division of Sydney following the deselection of the previous right-aligned MP, Les McMahon. He ran on a platform similar to that advocated by Tony Benn in the British Labour Party, arguing for a revival of Labor's commitment to state ownership and for the implementation of industrial democracy. He held the seat from 1983 to 1998. He served as Minister for Employment and Education Services in April 1990, Minister for Higher Education and Employment Services from May 1990 to March 1993, and Minister for Social Security from March 1993 to the defeat of the Keating government in March 1996.

== Later career ==
After leaving politics, Baldwin developed and co-founded Debategraph in March 2008, a web-based collaborative argument visualisation tool for mapping complex public policy debates which is used by the White House, the UK Foreign and Commonwealth Office, and the Amanpour series on CNN. He chairs the Blackheath Philosophy Forum.

Political offices
Preceded by Neal Blewett	Minister for Social Security; 1993–96	Succeeded by Jocelyn Newman
Parliament of Australia
Preceded by Les McMahon	Member for Sydney; 1983–98	Succeeded by Tanya Plibersek
