= Judi Moylan =

Australian politician

The Honourable Judi Moylan AO

Minister for the Status of Women
- In office 9 October 1997 – 21 October 1998
- Prime Minister: John Howard
- Preceded by: Jocelyn Newman
- Succeeded by: Jocelyn Newman

Minister for Family Services
- In office 11 March 1996 – 9 October 1997
- Prime Minister: John Howard
- Preceded by: Rosemary Crowley
- Succeeded by: Warwick Smith

Member of the Australian Parliament for Pearce
- In office 13 March 1993 – 5 August 2013
- Preceded by: Fred Chaney
- Succeeded by: Christian Porter

Personal details
- Born: 24 February 1944 (age 82) Guildford, Western Australia, Australia
- Party: Liberal
- Occupation: Lecturer, company director

Judith Eleanor Moylan AO (born 24 February 1944) is a former Australian politician. She served in the House of Representatives from 1993 to 2013, representing the Western Australian seat of Pearce for the Liberal Party. She served as Minister for Family Services (1996–1997) and Minister for the Status of Women (1997–1998) in the early years of Howard government and was known for her liberal views.

== Early life ==
Moylan was born on 24 February 1944 in Guildford, Western Australia. She completed a diploma in real estate management at Perth Technical College. She obtained a real estate licence in 1979 and subsequently established her own real estate business. Moylan was also a TAFE coordinator and lecturer from 1984 to 1987. She was president of the Midland and Districts Chamber of Commerce from 1990 to 1991.

== Politics ==
Moylan was first elected to parliament at the 1993 federal election. She was the first woman to hold a WA seat in the House of Representatives for the Liberal Party. She was a supporter of John Hewson in the 1994 leadership spill, in which Hewson was defeated by Alexander Downer. She was subsequently appointed to Downer's shadow ministry as the shadow small business minister.

Following the Coalition's victory at the 1996 federal election, Moylan was appointed Minister for Family Services in the Howard government. She was moved to the status of women portfolio in October 1997 and dropped from the ministry after the 1998 election. In November 1997 she appeared in a television advertising supporting a "Yes" vote in the republic referendum, alongside other Liberal ministers Amanda Vanstone and John Fahey.

Moylan was a leading member of the Liberal Party's "small-l liberal" wing, which made her stand out in an increasingly conservative party. In June 2005 she joined a backbench revolt led by Liberal colleague Petro Georgiou in an attempt to end the system of mandatory detention in Australia of asylum seekers. On 28 July 2011, she announced she would stand down at the next federal election.

== Notes ==
Political offices
Preceded by Rosemary Crowley	Minister for Family Services; 1996–1997	Succeeded by Warwick Smith
Preceded by Jocelyn Newman	Minister assisting the Prime; Minister for the Status of Women; 1997–1998	Succeeded by Jocelyn Newman
Parliament of Australia
Preceded by Fred Chaney	Member for Pearce; 1993–2013	Succeeded by Christian Porter
