= Downer shadow ministry =

The Shadow Ministry of Alexander Downer was a shadow ministry led by the Opposition Leader and leader of the Liberal Party of Australia, Alexander Downer, in the Parliament of Australia between 23 May 1994 and 30 January 1995. While serving no formal status—only the Leader and Deputy Leader received remuneration for their role over and above that of a Member of Parliament—it was intended to improve the effectiveness of the Opposition by providing an alternative Ministry to voters, consisting of shadow ministers who could ask role-specific questions in parliament, provide comment to the media and offer alternative policies to the government in their areas of responsibility.

The governing ministry at the time was the Second Keating Ministry.

== Shadow Ministry (May 1994 to September 1994) ==
The list below contains a list of Downer's initial shadow ministry:

Party key	Liberal
Party key	National

Shadow Minister	Office
Alexander Downer	Leader of the Liberal Party; Leader of the Opposition
Tim Fischer	Leader of the National Party; Shadow Minister for Trade
Peter Costello	Deputy Leader of the Opposition; Shadow Treasurer
Robert Hill	Leader of the Opposition in the Senate; Shadow Minister for Education; Shadow Minister for Science and Technology
John Anderson	Deputy Leader of the National Party; Shadow Minister for Primary Industry
Richard Alston	Shadow Minister for Communications; Shadow Minister for the Arts
Dr John Hewson	Shadow Minister for Industry and Commerce; Shadow Minister for Infrastructure; Shadow Minister for Customs
Andrew Peacock	Shadow Minister for Foreign Affairs
Peter Reith	Shadow Minister for Defence
John Howard	Shadow Minister for Industrial Relations; Manager of Opposition Business
Dr David Kemp	Shadow Minister for Employment and Training; Shadow Minister for Family Services
Ian McLachlan, AO	Shadow Minister for Environment and Heritage
John Moore	Shadow Minister for Privatisation; Shadow Minister for Public Administration
Bronwyn Bishop	Shadow Minister for Health
Peter McGauran	Shadow Minister for Resources and Energy
Philip Ruddock	Shadow Minister for Social Security
Ian Macdonald	Shadow Minister for Regional Development
Geoff Prosser	Shadow Minister for Finance
Ron Boswell	Shadow Minister for Consumer Affairs

=== Outer Shadow Ministry ===
Party key	Liberal
Party key	National
Party key	Country Liberal

Shadow Minister	Office
Chris Miles	Shadow Minister for Schools; Shadow Minister for Vocational Education and Training
John Sharp	Shadow Minister for Transport
Amanda Vanstone	Shadow Minister for Justice; Shadow Attorney-General
Jim Short	Shadow Minister for Immigration; Shadow Minister for Ethnic Affairs
Judi Moylan	Shadow Minister for Small Business; Shadow Minister for Women's Affairs
Warwick Parer	Shadow Minister for Aviation; Shadow Minister for Tourism
Michael Wooldridge	Shadow Minister for Community Services; Shadow Minister for Senior Citizens
Wilson Tuckey	Shadow Minister for Veterans Affairs; Shadow Minister for Defence Personnel
Chris Gallus	Shadow Minister for Aboriginal Affairs
Grant Tambling	Shadow Minister for Housing; Shadow Minister for External Territories; Shadow Minister for Northern Development
Rod Kemp	Shadow Minister for Administrative Services
Bruce Scott	Shadow Minister for Local Government
Ian Campbell	Shadow Minister for Sport and Recreation; Shadow Minister for Youth Affairs

== Shadow Ministry (September 1994 to January 1995) ==
After the resignation of Peacock and the sacking of Hewson, Downer reshuffled his ministry as follows.

Party key	Liberal
Party key	National

Shadow Minister	Office
Alexander Downer	Leader of the Liberal Party; Leader of the Opposition
Tim Fischer	Leader of the National Party; Shadow Minister for Trade
Peter Costello	Deputy Leader of the Opposition; Shadow Treasurer
Robert Hill	Leader of the Opposition in the Senate; Shadow Minister for Education; Shadow Minister for Science and Technology
John Anderson	Deputy Leader of the National Party; Shadow Minister for Primary Industry
Richard Alston	Shadow Minister for Communications; Shadow Minister for the Arts
John Moore	Shadow Minister for Industry and Commerce; Shadow Minister for Privatisation
Peter Reith	Shadow Minister for Foreign Affairs
Jocelyn Newman	Shadow Minister for Defence
John Howard	Shadow Minister for Industrial Relations; Manager of Opposition Business
Dr David Kemp	Shadow Minister for Employment and Training; Shadow Minister for Family Services
Ian McLachlan, AO	Shadow Minister for Environment and Heritage
Bronwyn Bishop	Shadow Minister for Health
Peter McGauran	Shadow Minister for Resources and Energy
Philip Ruddock	Shadow Minister for Social Security
Ian Macdonald	Shadow Minister for Regional Development; Shadow Minister for Infrastructure
Geoff Prosser	Shadow Minister for Finance
Ron Boswell	Shadow Minister for Consumer Affairs

=== Outer Shadow Ministry ===
Party key	Liberal
Party key	National
Party key	Country Liberal

Shadow Minister	Office
Chris Miles	Shadow Minister for Schools; Shadow Minister for Vocational Education and Training
John Sharp	Shadow Minister for Transport
Amanda Vanstone	Shadow Minister for Justice; Shadow Attorney-General
Jim Short	Shadow Minister for Immigration; Shadow Minister for Ethnic Affairs
Judi Moylan	Shadow Minister for Small Business; Shadow Minister for Women's Affairs
Warwick Parer	Shadow Minister for Aviation; Shadow Minister for Tourism; Shadow Minister for Customs
Michael Wooldridge	Shadow Minister for Community Services; Shadow Minister for Senior Citizens
Wilson Tuckey	Shadow Minister for Veterans Affairs; Shadow Minister for Defence Personnel
Chris Gallus	Shadow Minister for Aboriginal Affairs
Grant Tambling	Shadow Minister for Housing; Shadow Minister for External Territories; Shadow Minister for Northern Development
Rod Kemp	Shadow Minister for Administrative Services; Shadow Minister for Public Administration
Bruce Scott	Shadow Minister for Local Government
Ian Campbell	Shadow Minister for Sport and Recreation; Shadow Minister for Youth Affairs
David Connolly	Shadow Minister for Superannuation/Retirement Income
