= Les McMahon =

Australian politician

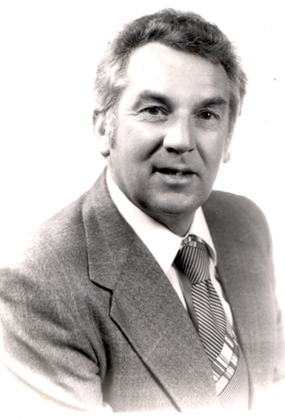
- James Leslie McMahon

Member of the Australian Parliament for Sydney
- In office 13 December 1975 – 4 February 1983
- Preceded by: Jim Cope
- Succeeded by: Peter Baldwin

Personal details
- Born: 26 February 1930 Sydney
- Died: 23 January 2015 (aged 84) Sydney
- Party: Australian Labor Party
- Spouse: Patricia Kathleen Wellings
- Occupation: Plumber

James Leslie "Les" McMahon (26 February 1930 – 23 January 2015) was an Australian politician. Born in Sydney, he was a plumber, gasfitter and drainer and then an organiser for the Plumbers and Gasfitters Employees Union of Australia (NSW branch). He was elected to Sydney City Council in 1967, Leichhardt City Council in 1968, and Sydney City Council again in 1971.

In 1975, he was elected to the Australian House of Representatives as the Labor member for Sydney, a position he held until his retirement in 1983 after being deselected for the seat in favour of Peter Baldwin. During that time in Parliament, he had two full-time staff, he was on three Parliamentary Committees for Labor, namely, the Industry and Works Committee, Health Committee and Urban Committee. McMahon was also on three joint Parliamentary Committees in the Commonwealth Parliament, House of Parliament Committee, Road Safety Committee and Public Works Committee (where he was appointed Deputy President). McMahon was also the Deputy Chair of the Labor Caucus and Deputy Whip in Parliament. A few months after retiring from Politics in 1983, he was employed as a Commissioner of the NSW Conciliation and Arbitration Commission, where he remained until he retired from work in 1993.

On 11 February 2015, the Australian Federal Parliament observed a moment of silence in honor of McMahon following his death. The current sitting Labor member of the Federal seat of Sydney, Ms Tanya Plibersek described McMahon as "a man of strong convictions" and quoted:

McMahon's loyalty remained always to the Labor Party. It is a measure of the man that, when he was defeated as a sitting member in a preselection, he handed out for the winning candidate on election day. He was a dedicated and committed local member. He was accessible and proud of the urban renewal legacy left by the Whitlam government. The people of Sydney owe a great deal to McMahon's enthusiastic and energetic championing of their interests.

== Biography ==
In 1952, McMahon married Patricia Wellings. McMahon and Patricia were married for 60 years before Patricia's death in 2013. They had 8 children, 24 grandchildren and 16 great-grandchildren.

In 2013, McMahon's grandson Lee McMahon, wrote a biography of McMahon's life. The story is told pretty much in McMahon's own words from his perspective because the Commonwealth Parliament Oral History Project interviewed McMahon in 1989 at the age of 59, just six years after his retirement. McMahon died on 23 January 2015 in Sydney from prostate cancer.

Parliament of Australia
Preceded by Jim Cope	Member for Sydney; 1975–1983	Succeeded by Peter Baldwin
