= Jocelyn Newman =

Australian politician

The Honourable Jocelyn Newman AO

Minister for Social Security
- In office 11 March 1996 – 21 October 1998
- Prime Minister: John Howard
- Preceded by: Peter Baldwin
- Succeeded by: Joe Hockey

Minister for Family and Community Services
- In office 21 October 1998 – 30 January 2001
- Prime Minister: John Howard
- Preceded by: Michael Wooldridge
- Succeeded by: Amanda Vanstone

Senator for Tasmania
- In office 13 March 1986 – 1 February 2002
- Preceded by: Peter Rae
- Succeeded by: Richard Colbeck

Personal details
- Born: Jocelyn Margaret Mullett; 8 July 1937 Melbourne, Victoria, Australia
- Died: 1 April 2018 (aged 80) Berry, New South Wales, Australia
- Citizenship: Australian
- Party: Liberal Party of Australia
- Spouse: Kevin Newman (m. 1961; died 1999)
- Children: Campbell Newman, Kate Roff
- Education: University of Melbourne
- Profession: Barrister, solicitor

Jocelyn Margaret Newman AO (née Mullett; 8 July 1937 – 1 April 2018) was an Australian politician. She was a Senator for Tasmania for 15 years, and a minister in the Howard government.

== Early life and career ==
Jocelyn Margaret Mullett was born in 1937 in Melbourne, the eldest of three surviving children of Lyndhurst Mullett, a solicitor, and his wife Margaret (née Maughan). She was educated at Mont Albert Central School and Presbyterian Ladies' College. She was a barrister and solicitor before entering Parliament.

== Political career ==
Newman was appointed to the Senate on 13 March 1986. In her first Senate speech, she quoted Dame Enid Lyons's first speech in the House of Representatives [from 1943]: "I know so well that fear, want and idleness can kill the spirit of any people. But I know too that security can be bought at too great a cost—the cost of spiritual freedom."

She served as Minister for Social Security in the first Howard Ministry from March 1996 to October 1998, Minister assisting the Prime Minister for the Status of Women from March 1996 to October 1997 and Minister for Family and Community Services and Minister assisting the Prime Minister for the Status of Women from October 1998 to January 2001.

She resigned from parliament on 1 February 2002.

In the 2005 Queen's Birthday Honours Newman was made an Officer of the Order of Australia (AO) "For service to the community through contributions to the development of government policies in relation to social security reform, as an advocate for women's issues, particularly in the health and welfare areas, and as a supporter of local organisations in Tasmania."

== Personal life ==
Newman was married to Kevin Newman from 1961 until his death in 1999, and had two children, including Campbell Newman.

She was successfully treated for breast cancer during her time in office.

Newman died at Berry, New South Wales on 1 April 2018, aged 80, from Alzheimer's disease.

== See also ==
- Political families of Australia

Political offices
| Preceded by Peter Baldwin | Minister for Social Security; 1996–98 | Succeeded by Joe Hockey |
| Preceded by Carmen Lawrence | Minister assisting the Prime; Minister for the Status of Women; 1996–97 | Succeeded by Judi Moylan |
| Preceded by Warwick Smith as Minister for Family Services | Minister for Family and Community Services; 1998–2001 | Succeeded by Amanda Vanstone |
| Preceded by Judi Moylan | Minister assisting the Prime; Minister for the Status of Women; 1998–2001 | Succeeded by Amanda Vanstone |
