= Electoral results for the Division of Solomon =

Division election results

This is a list of electoral results for the Division of Solomon in Australian federal elections from the division's creation in 2001 until the present.

== Members ==
Member	Party	Term
Dave Tollner	Country Liberal	2001–2007
Damian Hale	Labor	2007–2010
Natasha Griggs	Country Liberal	2010–2016
Luke Gosling	Labor	2016–present

== Election results ==
=== Elections in the 2020s ===
==== 2025 ====
2025 Australian federal election: Solomon
Party	Candidate	Votes	%	±%
Country Liberal	Lisa Bayliss	21,642	35.99	+10.28
Labor	Luke Gosling	19,751	32.85	−5.97
Independent	Phil Scott	7,501	12.47	+12.47
Greens	Jonathan Parry	6,167	10.26	−4.28
One Nation	Benjamin Craker	4,033	6.71	+1.28
Independent	Janey Davies	693	1.15	+1.15
Citizens	Brian Kristo	343	0.57	+0.49
Total formal votes		60,130	96.41	+0.10
Informal votes		2,240	3.59	−0.10
Turnout		62,370	79.25	+0.49
Two-candidate-preferred result
Labor	Luke Gosling	30,853	51.31	−7.09
Country Liberal	Lisa Bayliss	29,277	48.69	+7.09
Labor hold		Swing	−7.09	

==== 2022 ====
2022 Australian federal election: Solomon
Party	Candidate	Votes	%	±%
Labor	Luke Gosling	21,775	39.50	−0.54
Country Liberal	Tina Macfarlane	13,771	24.98	−13.07
Greens	Aiya Goodrich Carttling	8,164	14.81	+2.97
Liberal Democrats	Kylie Bonanni	5,839	10.59	+10.59
One Nation	Emily Lohse	2,948	5.35	+5.35
United Australia	Tayla Selfe	2,628	4.77	+1.90
Total formal votes		55,125	96.48	+0.85
Informal votes		2,011	3.52	−0.85
Turnout		57,136	79.53	−3.55
Two-party-preferred result
Labor	Luke Gosling	32,726	59.37	+6.29
Country Liberal	Tina Macfarlane	22,399	40.63	−6.29
Labor hold		Swing	+6.29	

Alluvial diagram for preference flows in the seat of Solomon in the 2022 federal election. indicates at what stage the winning candidate had over 50% of the votes and was declared the winner.

=== Elections in 2010s ===
==== 2019 ====
2019 Australian federal election: Solomon
Party	Candidate	Votes	%	±%
Labor	Luke Gosling	22,057	40.04	−0.90
Country Liberal	Kathy Ganley	20,962	38.05	+3.61
Greens	Timothy Parish	6,521	11.84	+1.58
Independent	Sue Fraser-Adams	2,684	4.87	+4.87
United Australia	Raj Samson Rajwin	1,583	2.87	+2.87
Rise Up Australia	Lorraine Gimini	1,277	2.32	+0.53
Total formal votes		55,084	95.63	+2.58
Informal votes		2,518	4.37	−2.58
Turnout		57,602	83.08	−0.95
Two-party-preferred result
Labor	Luke Gosling	29,240	53.08	−3.01
Country Liberal	Kathy Ganley	25,844	46.92	+3.01
Labor hold		Swing	−3.01	

==== 2016 ====
2016 Australian federal election: Solomon
Party	Candidate	Votes	%	±%
Labor	Luke Gosling	22,308	40.87	+5.44
Country Liberal	Natasha Griggs	18,804	34.45	−10.24
Greens	Todd Williams	5,553	10.17	+2.18
Independent	Mark Garner	1,644	3.01	+3.01
Shooters, Fishers, Farmers	Marty Reinhold	1,523	2.79	+2.79
Liberal Democrats	Robert Dawes	1,275	2.34	+2.34
HEMP	Lance Lawrence	1,143	2.09	+2.09
Rise Up Australia	Silvija Majetic	985	1.80	+0.81
Australia First	John Kearney	798	1.46	+1.46
Online Direct Democracy	Nevin Cartwright	369	0.68	+0.68
Citizens Electoral Council	Brigid McCullough	183	0.34	−0.07
Total formal votes		54,585	93.05	−1.65
Informal votes		4,080	6.95	+1.65
Turnout		58,665	83.81	−5.50
Two-party-preferred result
Labor	Luke Gosling	30,566	56.00	+7.40
Country Liberal	Natasha Griggs	24,019	44.00	−7.40
Labor gain from Country Liberal		Swing	+7.40	

==== 2013 ====
2013 Australian federal election: Solomon
Party	Candidate	Votes	%	±%
Country Liberal	Natasha Griggs	23,875	44.69	−1.68
Labor	Luke Gosling	18,929	35.43	−0.65
Greens	Todd Williams	4,269	7.99	−5.30
Palmer United	Stephen Spain	2,691	5.04	+5.04
Sex Party	Krystal Metcalf	1,847	3.46	+3.46
Voluntary Euthanasia	Martin Burgess	597	1.12	+1.12
Rise Up Australia	Paul Sellick	527	0.99	+0.99
First Nations	Eileen Cummings	470	0.88	+0.88
Citizens Electoral Council	Trudy Campbell	217	0.41	−0.90
Total formal votes		53,422	94.70	−0.24
Informal votes		2,991	5.30	+0.24
Turnout		56,413	89.17	−0.45
Two-party-preferred result
Country Liberal	Natasha Griggs	27,461	51.40	−0.35
Labor	Luke Gosling	25,961	48.60	+0.35
Country Liberal hold		Swing	−0.35	

==== 2010 ====
2010 Australian federal election: Solomon
Party	Candidate	Votes	%	±%
Country Liberal	Natasha Griggs	23,627	46.37	−0.43
Labor	Damian Hale	18,384	36.08	−5.82
Greens	Emma Young	6,772	13.29	+4.22
One Nation	John Kearney	1,505	2.95	+2.95
Citizens Electoral Council	Trudy Campbell	668	1.31	+0.83
Total formal votes		50,956	94.94	−2.13
Informal votes		2,716	5.06	+2.13
Turnout		53,672	89.63	−2.43
Two-party-preferred result
Country Liberal	Natasha Griggs	26,371	51.75	+1.94
Labor	Damian Hale	24,585	48.25	−1.94
Country Liberal gain from Labor		Swing	+1.94	

=== Elections in the 2000s ===
==== 2007 ====
2007 Australian federal election: Solomon
Party	Candidate	Votes	%	±%
Country Liberal	Dave Tollner	24,109	46.80	−1.95
Labor	Damian Hale	21,581	41.90	+3.37
Greens	Debbie Hudson	4,672	9.07	+2.30
Independent	Maurice Foley	545	1.06	−0.44
Liberty & Democracy	Jacques Chester	358	0.70	+0.70
Citizens Electoral Council	Trudy Campbell	245	0.48	−0.01
Total formal votes		51,510	97.07	+0.98
Informal votes		1,555	2.93	−1.07
Turnout		53,065	91.29	+0.98
Two-party-preferred result
Labor	Damian Hale	25,853	50.19	+3.00
Country Liberal	Dave Tollner	25,657	49.81	−3.00
Labor gain from Country Liberal		Swing	+3.00	

==== 2004 ====
2004 Australian federal election: Solomon
Party	Candidate	Votes	%	±%
Country Liberal	Dave Tollner	23,361	48.75	+6.94
Labor	Jim Davidson	18,464	38.53	+0.17
Greens	Ilana Eldridge	3,256	6.77	+1.63
Family First	Mark West	1,000	2.09	+2.09
Democrats	Duncan Dean	892	1.86	−3.58
	Maurice Foley	718	1.50	+1.50
Citizens Electoral Council	Peter Flynn	235	0.49	+0.49
Total formal votes		47,916	96.00	+0.43
Informal votes		1,996	4.00	−0.43
Turnout		49,912	91.21	−0.78
Two-party-preferred result
Country Liberal	Dave Tollner	25,303	52.81	+2.72
Labor	Jim Davidson	22,613	47.19	−2.72
Country Liberal hold		Swing	+2.72	

==== 2001 ====
2001 Australian federal election: Solomon
Party	Candidate	Votes	%	±%
Country Liberal	Dave Tollner	19,828	41.81	−0.87
Labor	Laurene Hull	18,195	38.36	−0.22
Democrats	Ted Dunstan	2,582	5.44	+0.32
Greens	David Pollock	2,439	5.14	+1.72
Independent	Maisie Austin	2,378	5.01	+5.01
One Nation	Mervyn Stewart	1,669	3.52	−4.77
Independent	Maurie Ryan-Japarta	337	0.71	+0.71
Total formal votes		47,428	95.57	−0.85
Informal votes		2,196	4.43	+0.85
Turnout		49,624	92.40	
Two-party-preferred result
Country Liberal	Dave Tollner	23,758	50.09	−2.15
Labor	Laurene Hull	23,670	49.91	+2.15
Country Liberal notional hold		Swing	−2.15	
