= Eileen Cummings =

Australian Northern Territory indigenous leader

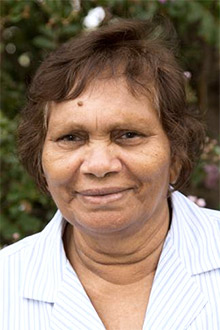

Australia's First Nations Political Party candidate for the Division of Solomon in the Australian House of Representatives
- Election date 7 September 2013
- Opponent(s): Natasha Griggs (CLP), Luke Gosling (ALP), Todd Williams (Greens)
- Incumbent: Natasha Griggs (CLP)

Personal details
- Born: 1943 (age 82–83) Arnhem Land
- Party: Australia's First Nations Political Party
- Parent: Florrie Lindsay
- Occupation: Policy and liaison officer, teacher

Eileen Cummings (born 1943) is a teacher, policy and liaison officer and Indigenous leader in the Northern Territory of Australia. She is a member of the Rembarrnga Ngalakan ethnic groups. She is also a member of the 'Stolen Generation' and is an activist advocating for the well-being of living members of that group.

== Early life ==
Eileen Cummings was born in Arnhem Land in the Barunga-Wugularr region where she lived along with her mother, Florrie Lindsay, and her stepfather, Chuckerduck. She is a member of the 'Stolen Generation' having been separated from her family when she was four and a half. This event took place at Mainoru Station in central Arnhem Land in 1949. Her departure initially met with excitement to be going for a ride. However, her joy gave way to longing for her mother when a red truck came to pick her up without her mother's knowledge. Subsequently, she was taken to the Maranboy Police Station before finding her new home on Croker Island. Her name was changed and she was taught to be ashamed of her aboriginal identity while growing up in the institution. Cummings remained at this institution until she was fifteen, after which she resided in a foster home in Darwin until she was eighteen. It was in her adulthood when she returned to see her mother, Lindsay.

== Career ==
Cummings was the first Indigenous person in the Northern Territory to qualify as a pre-school teacher. She also worked as a policy adviser to the Northern Territory Chief Minister in the Office of Women's Policies where she gave advice on women's issues. She coordinated the consultation in the development of the Aboriginal Family Violence Strategy and was a co-author.

In the 2013 Federal Election, Cummings was unsuccessful as Australian First Nations Political Party candidate for the Division of Solomon in the House of Representatives.

She is the Chairperson of the Northern Territory Stolen Generations Aboriginal Corporation. She works to bring compensation to those who are part of the Stolen Generation and on Sorry Day, 2017, filed a case with the NT Stolen Generations organization against the federal government.

She is a University Fellow of Charles Darwin University.
