= COVID-19 pandemic in Asia =

- Disease: COVID-19
- Pathogen: SARS-CoV-2
- Location: Asia
- First outbreak: Wuhan, Hubei, China
- Confirmed cases: 17,725,946
- Active cases: 1,770,067
- Recovered: 15,651,219
- Deaths: 304,660
- Territories: 49

The COVID-19 pandemic began in Asia in Wuhan, Hubei, China, and has spread widely through the continent. As of 25 September 2026, at least one case of COVID-19 had been reported in every country in Asia except Turkmenistan.

The Asian countries with the highest numbers of confirmed coronavirus cases are India, South Korea, Turkey, Vietnam, and Iran. Despite being the first area of the world hit by the outbreak, the early wide-scale response of some Asian states, particularly Bhutan, Singapore, Taiwan, and Vietnam has allowed them to fare comparatively well. China was criticised for initially minimising the severity of the outbreak, but its wide-scale response has largely contained the disease since March 2020.

As of July 2021, the highest numbers of deaths are recorded in India, Indonesia, Iran, and Turkey, each with more than 90,000 deaths and more than 900,000 deaths combined. However, the death toll in Iran and Indonesia are claimed to be much higher than the official figures. Per capita, the highest deaths have been disproportionally in several Western Asian states, with Georgia having the highest figure closely followed by Armenia, and Iran in third, whereas China had the lowest.

== Statistics by country and territory ==
Summary table of confirmed cases in Asia (as of 30 December 2023)
Country/Territory	Cases	Active cases	Deaths	Recoveries	Ref
China	99,381,761	N/A	122,398	N/A	
India	45,040,752	247	533,622	44,506,883	
South Korea	34,571,873	N/A	35,934	N/A	
Japan	33,803,572	N/A	74,694	N/A	
Russia	22,900,755	178,807	398,736	22,323,212	
Turkey	16,829,941	57,717	100,979	16,677,245	
Vietnam	11,619,990	936,822	43,206	10,639,962	
Taiwan	10,152,881	N/A	18,425	N/A	
Iran	7,539,698	79,055	144,199	7,316,444	
Indonesia	6,812,127	8,245	161,879	6,642,003	
Malaysia	5,227,322	27,894	37,293	5,162,135	
Thailand	4,730,490	3,907	33,947	4,692,636	
Israel	4,642,530	8,635	11,656	4,622,239	
Philippines	3,908,295	25,262	62,342	3,820,691	
Hong Kong	2,862,312	271,006	13,203	1,371,169	
Iraq	2,458,509	1,504	25,348	2,431,657	
Bangladesh	2,038,488	3,206	29,446	2,005,836	
Singapore	1,859,937	77,752	1,602	1,782,583	
Jordan	1,738,867	2,903	14,114	1,721,850	
(Georgia (country)) Georgia	1,735,682	81,500	16,889	1,637,293	
Pakistan	1,580,631	1,689	30,656	1,548,286	
Kazakhstan	1,407,823	1,566	13,843	1,392,414	
Lebanon	1,212,668	114,435	10,646	1,087,587	
United Arab Emirates	1,067,030	10,156	2,349	1,054,525	
Nepal	1,003,361	9	12,031	991,321	
Mongolia	980,442	4,328	2,179	973,935	
Saudi Arabia	827,861	2,843	9,570	815 448	
Azerbaijan	831,659	91	10,268	821,300	
Bahrain	673,996	1,722	1,518	670,756	
Sri Lanka	670,444	290	16,728	653,426	
Kuwait	657,745	312	2,563	654,870	
Myanmar	634,258	110	19,490	614,658	
Palestine	620,371	8,267	5,402	606,702	
Cyprus	579,899	5,161	1,173	573,565	
Qatar	436,820	5,047	682	431,091	
Armenia	436,727	4,706	8,662	423,359	
Oman	397,846	8,917	4,260	384,669	
Uzbekistan	243,893	770	1,637	241,876	
Brunei	223,059	3,273	225	219,561	
Laos	212,083	N/A	883	N/A	
Kyrgyzstan	205,835	6,438	2,991	196,406	
Afghanistan	196,182	14,458	7,789	174,935	
Maldives	184,924	20,929	308	163,687	
Cambodia	137,719	73	3,056	134,590	
Bhutan	59,614	29	21	59,564	
Syria	57,166	135	3,163	53,868	
Timor-Leste	23,217	44	138	23,035	
Tajikistan	17,388	0	124	17,264	
Yemen	11,932	658	2,155	9,119	
Macau	3,587	19	121	3,447	
Christmas Island	521	N/A	0	511	
Cocos (Keeling) Islands	249	N/A	0	248	
Total	201,938,760	5,751,120	1,858,735	194,125,378	

== Timeline by country and territory ==
=== Afghanistan ===
On 23 February 2020, at least three citizens of Herat who had recently returned from Qom were suspected of COVID-19 infection. Blood samples were sent to Kabul for further testing. Afghanistan later closed its border with Iran.

On 24 February, Afghanistan confirmed the first COVID-19 case involving one of the three people from Herat, a 35-year-old man who tested positive for SARS-CoV-2. On 7 March, three new cases were confirmed in Herat Province. On 10 March, the first case reported outside of Herat province, was in Samangan Province, bringing to the total to five cases.

=== Armenia ===
Armenia confirmed the first case of coronavirus during the late night of 29 February/early morning of 1 March, announcing a 29-year-old Armenian citizen had returned from Iran and was confirmed positive for the virus. His wife was tested and results came in negative. Prime Minister Nikol Pashinyan declared that he is "now in good condition". About 30 people who came in contact with him are being tested and will be quarantined. Armenia had earlier closed its border with Iran. As of 15 March there are 23 confirmed cases with over 300 being in quarantine. On 23 March, it confirmed 23 cases.

=== Azerbaijan ===
On 28 February, Azerbaijan confirmed the first case from a Russian national, who was travelling from Iran. On 12 March, a woman died from multiorgan failure who had been diagnosed with COVID-19 a day earlier. This marked the first death of coronavirus in Azerbaijan. On 22 March, the first domestic human to human transmission was confirmed. On 31 March, Azerbaijan declared nationwide quarantine. People are required to stay in private houses and apartments, permanent or temporary places of residence until 20 April.

=== Bahrain ===
The first case in the country was confirmed on 21 February. The index case was a school bus driver who had travelled to Iran. Bahrain has recorded a total of 2,009 COVID-19 cases including 7 deaths and 1,026 recoveries. The Bahraini government has unveiled a stimulus packages of 4.3 billion Bahraini Dinars that include exempting consumers from bills of electricity and water for three months.

=== Bangladesh ===
The first three COVID-19 cases of the country were found on 7 March 2020 that was officially confirmed on 8 March 2020 by Professor Dr Meerjady Sabrina Flora, former director, Institute of Epidemiology, Disease Control and Research (IEDCR), then. Two of those affected returned to Bangladesh from Italy and one was a family member of one of those two. On 18 March, the first known coronavirus death in the country was reported.

On 22 March, Bangladesh declared a 10-day shutdown effective from 26 March to 4 April to fight the spread of coronavirus. Bangladesh on Wednesday reported the fifth death from the coronavirus though no new case of the infection came out in the last 24 hours as the country suspended all domestic flights, trains and public transport to fight the pandemic.

The Institute of Epidemiology, Disease Control and Research (IEDCR) has confirmed that one more person has died of coronavirus (COVID-19) infection in Bangladesh, taking the number of deaths from the disease in the country to five, the Dhaka Tribune reported.

Bangladesh on Wednesday confirmed another death taking the death toll in the country to six while number of positive cases rose to 54.The nationwide lockdown has been extended till 9 April to curb the spread, however Prime Minister Sheikh Hasina on Tuesday said that offices and industries could resume work. Health minister Zahid Malik said "another 300 ventilators are being imported. There are about 700 ventilators across private hospitals".

=== Bhutan ===
On 6 March, the first case in the country was confirmed, a 76-year-old US male who travelled to the country.

=== Brunei ===
On 9 March, the Ministry of Health confirmed that a preliminary coronavirus test had returned positive for a 53-year-old male who had returned from Kuala Lumpur, Malaysia on 3 March. The patient was moved to the National Isolation Centre in Tutong for treatment.

=== Cambodia ===
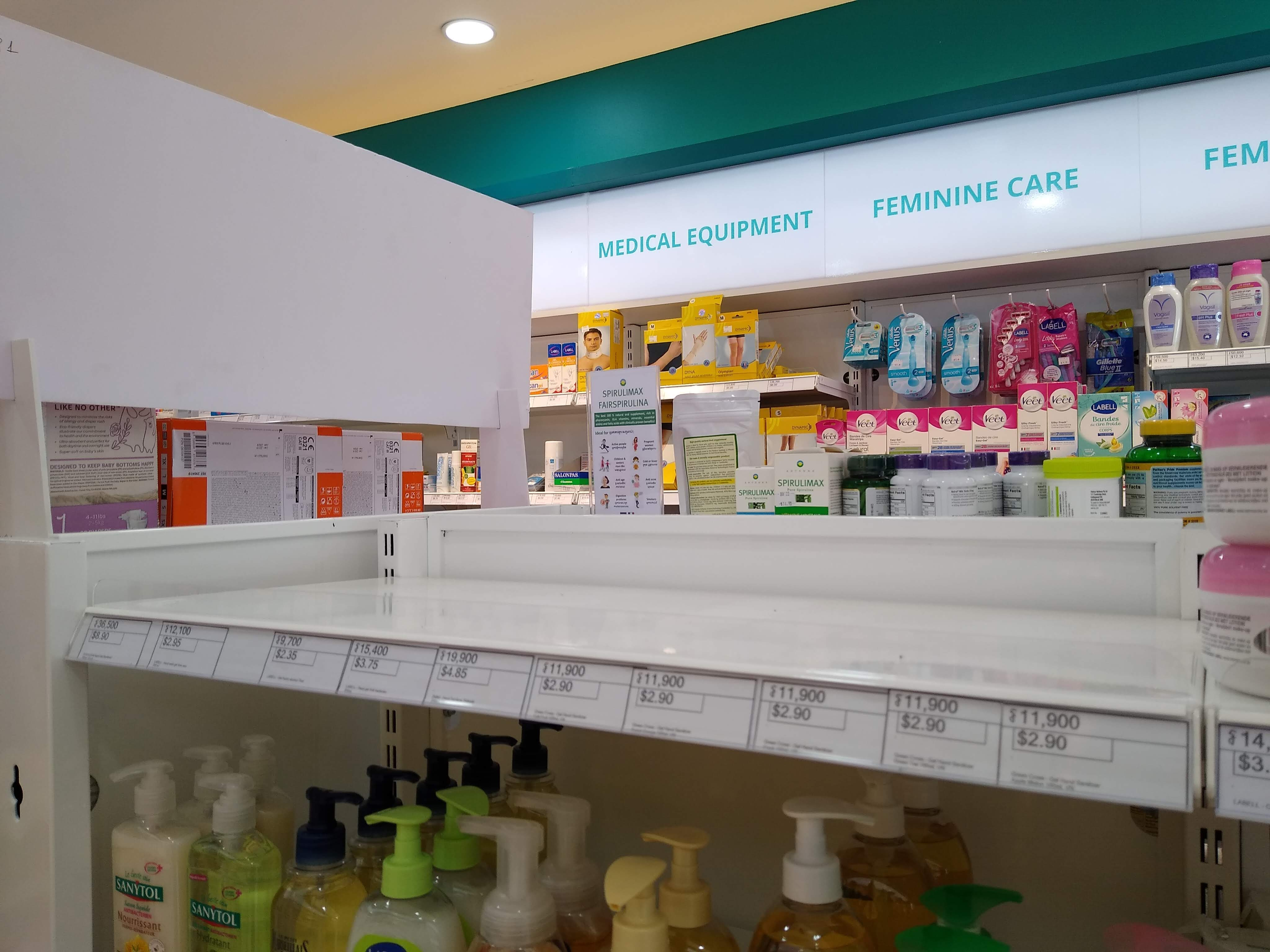
The hand sanitizer shelf at a pharmacy in Kep, Cambodia, was emptied the day after the first COVID-19 case was confirmed in the country.

On 27 January, Cambodia confirmed the first COVID-19 case in Sihanoukville, a 60-year-old Chinese man, travelling to the coastal city from Wuhan with his family on 23 January. Three other members of his family were placed under quarantine as they did not appear to have symptoms, while he was placed in a separate room at the Preah Sihanouk Referral Hospital. By 10 February, after two weeks of being treated and kept under observation, he had fully recovered, Health Ministry stated on account of testing negative for the third time by Pasteur Institute of Cambodia. The family were finally discharged and flew back to their home country on the next day as of the 80 Chinese nationals who arrived in Sihanoukville on the same flight as the patient, most had since returned to China, although the city of Wuhan remained under quarantine at that time.

=== China ===
COVID-19 cases in mainland China, as of 13 April 2020, broken down by provinces

The COVID-19 pandemic first originated in Wuhan, Hubei in which it manifested itself as cluster of mysterious suspected pneumonia cases. Sophisticated modelling of the outbreak suggests that the number of cases in mainland China would have been many times higher without interventions such as early detection, and isolation of the infected.

Analyses have found that southern China had COVID-19 cases per capita than northern China, except in the early days of the pandemic. Some researchers have argued that could be because southern China has a history of rice farming, which required more coordination to manage shared irrigation networks. Thus, rice-farming cultures have stronger social norms, which were linked to stronger COVID pre-cautions, such as mask-wearing.

Following the initial outbreak, China opted for containment, inflicting strict lockdowns to eliminate spread. The vaccines distributed in China included the BIBP, WIBP, and CoronaVac. It was reported on 11 December 2021, that China had vaccinated 1.162 billion of its citizens, or 82.5% of the total population of the country against COVID-19. China's large-scale adoption of zero-COVID had largely contained the first waves of infections of the disease. When the waves of infections due to the Omicron variant followed, China was almost alone in pursuing the strategy of zero-Covid to combat the spread of the virus in 2022. Lockdown continued to be employed in November to combat a new wave of cases; however, protests erupted in cities across China over the country's stringent measures, and in December that year, the country relaxed its zero-COVID policy. On 20 December 2022, the Chinese State Council narrowed its definition of what would be counted as a COVID-19 death to include solely respiratory failure, which led to skepticism by health experts of the government's total death count at a time when hospitals reported being overwhelmed with cases following the abrupt discontinuation of zero-COVID.

On 29 December 2022, the U.S. joined Italy, Japan, Taiwan and India in requiring negative COVID-19 test results from all people traveling from China due to the new surge in cases. The European Union initially refused similar measures, stating that the BF7 omicron variant had already spread throughout Europe without becoming dominant, but changed its stance following an emergency meeting of EU diplomats on 4 January 2023.

=== Christmas Island ===
On 8 March, the Australian external territory of Christmas Island reported its first case of COVID-19.

=== Cyprus ===
On 9 March, Cyprus confirmed its first 2 cases, one in Nicosia and one in Limassol.

=== Georgia ===
The outbreak in Georgia (as of 15 April): Red dots represent medical centers currently treating patients Strict quarantine regime Confirmed cases reported

All flights from China and Wuhan to Tbilisi International Airport were cancelled until 27 January. The Health Ministry announced that all arriving passengers from China would be screened. Georgia also temporarily shut down all flights to Iran.

On 26 February, Georgia confirmed its first COVID-19 case. A 50-year-old man, who returned to Georgia from Iran, was admitted to Infectious Diseases Hospital in Tbilisi. He came back to the Georgian border via Azerbaijan by taxi.

On 28 February, Georgia confirmed that a 31-year-old Georgia woman who had travelled to Italy tested positive and was admitted to Infectious Diseases Hospital in Tbilisi.

29 more are being kept in isolation in a Tbilisi hospital, with Head of the Georgian National Centre for Disease Control, Amiran Gamkrelidze stating there was a "high probability" that some of them have the virus.

On 5 March, five people have tested positive for the new coronavirus COVID-19 in Georgia increasing the total number of people infected in the country to nine. Head of the Georgian National Centre for Disease Control Amiran Gamkrelidze made the announcement at the recent news briefing following today. He said, all of the five people belong to the same cluster who travelled together to Italy and returned to Georgia on Sunday.

On 7 March, three people have tested positive for the new coronavirus in Georgia increasing the total number of people infected individuals in the country to twelve. Head of the Georgian National Centre for Disease Control Amiran Gamkrelidze said at a news briefing the following day that there is still no reason to panic. One of the infected individuals is Gamkrelidze's son Nikoloz. Gamkrelidze wrote on his Facebook page that he contracted the illness from a coworker, who has been tested positive for COVID-19 on Wednesday. Georgia has suspended direct flights with Italy to prevent the spread of coronavirus in the country. Coronavirus in Georgia has mostly been detected in passengers who have travelled in Italy recently.

=== Hong Kong ===
As of 1 March, Hong Kong's Centre for Health Protection had identified 100 cases (Including 2 Suspected Recovered Cases) in Hong Kong, with 36 patients since recovered and 2 died. By 2 April, the number of confirmed or probable cases in Hong Kong has risen to 767 after an influx of returning overseas students. 467, or 60.89% of cases were imported cases.

=== India ===
India COVID-19 cumulative cases map

The COVID-19 pandemic in India is a part of the COVID-19 pandemic. COVID-19 is caused by SARS-CoV-2. As of 25 September 2026, according to Indian government figures, India has the second-highest number of confirmed cases in the world (after the United States) with 45,056,221 reported cases of COVID-19 infection and the third-highest number of COVID-19 deaths (after the United States and Brazil) at 533,849 deaths. In October 2021, the World Health Organization estimated 4.7 million excess deaths, both directly and indirectly related to COVID-19 to have taken place in India. Multiple studies, using several different sources of data and methods, have found similarly large estimates of excess deaths in India. These deaths were distributed unequally - marginalized social groups and women were more likely to have been impacted compared to privileged social groups and men.

The first cases of COVID-19 in India were reported on 30 January 2020 in three towns of Kerala, among three Indian medical students who had returned from Wuhan, the epicenter of the pandemic. Lockdowns were announced in Kerala on 23 March, and in the rest of the country on 25 March. Infection rates started to drop in September. Daily cases peaked mid-September with over 90,000 cases reported per-day, dropping to below 15,000 in January 2021. A second wave beginning in March 2021 was much more devastating than the first, with shortages of vaccines, hospital beds, oxygen cylinders and other medical supplies in parts of the country. By late April, India led the world in new and active cases. On 30 April 2021, it became the first country to report over 400,000 new cases in a 24-hour period. Experts stated that the virus may reach an endemic stage in India rather than completely disappear; in late August 2021, Soumya Swaminathan said India may be in some stage of endemicity where the country learns to live with the virus.

India began its vaccination programme on 16 January 2021 with AstraZeneca vaccine (Covishield) and the indigenous Covaxin. Later, Sputnik V and the Moderna vaccine was approved for emergency use too. On 30 January 2022, India announced that it administered about 1.7 billion doses of vaccines and more than 720 million people were fully vaccinated.

=== Indonesia ===

COVID-19 was confirmed to have spread to Indonesia on 2 March 2020, after a dance instructor and her mother tested positive for the virus. Both were infected from a Japanese national.

By 9 April 2020, the pandemic had spread to all 34 provinces in the country at that time. Jakarta, West Java, and Central Java are the worst-hit provinces, together accounting more than half of the national total cases. On 13 July 2020, the recoveries exceeded active cases for the first time.

As of , Indonesia has reported cases, the second highest in Southeast Asia, behind Vietnam. With deaths, Indonesia ranks second in Asia and ninth in the world. Review of data, however, indicated that the number of deaths may be much higher than what has been reported as those who died with acute COVID-19 symptoms but had not been confirmed or tested were not counted in the official death figure.

Instead of implementing a nationwide lockdown, the government applied "Large-Scale Social Restrictions" (Indonesian: Pembatasan Sosial Berskala Besar, abbreviated as PSBB), which was later modified into the "Community Activities Restrictions Enforcement" (Indonesian: Pemberlakuan Pembatasan Kegiatan Masyarakat, abbreviated as PPKM). On 30 December 2022, the restrictions were lifted for all regions in Indonesia since satisfied population immunity exceeded the expectation, although it did not lift the pandemic status.

On 13 January 2021, President Joko Widodo was vaccinated at the presidential palace, officially kicking off Indonesia's vaccination program. As of 5 February 2023 at 18:00 WIB (UTC+7), 204,266,655 people had received the first dose of the vaccine and 175,131,893 people had been fully vaccinated; 69,597,474 of them had been inoculated with the booster or the third dose.

=== Iran ===
Iran reported its first confirmed cases of SARS-CoV-2 infections on 19 February 2020 in Qom. Later that day, the Ministry of Health and Medical Education stated that both had died.

By 21 February, a total of 18 people had been confirmed to have SARS-CoV-2 infections and four COVID-19 deaths had occurred. On 24 February, according to the Ministry of Health and Medical Education, twelve COVID-19 deaths had occurred in Iran, out of a total of 64 SARS-CoV-2 confirmed infections.

On 25 February, Iran's Deputy Health Minister, Iraj Harirchi tested positive for COVID-19, having shown some signs of infection during the press conference. On 3 March, the official number of deaths in Iran rose to 77, the second highest deaths recorded outside China after Italy which has surpassed Iran, although the number of deaths is believed to be higher, up to 1,200 deaths due to Iranian Government's censorship and its eventual mishandling of virus outbreak. Iran currently has the most cases in Western Asia as well as the fourth most cases worldwide, with China, South Korea, and Italy surpassing Iran.

Iran's death toll goes to 2,234 on 26 March as 29,000 cases are reported. Public gatherings are banned as is transportation between cities; public parks are closed.

=== Iraq ===
The first case in the country was confirmed on 22 February.

=== Israel ===
On 21 February, Israel confirmed the first case of COVID-19.

On 20 March, the first confirmed death in Israel was reported.

As of 9 August, there are a total of 82,324 confirmed cases, with 57,071 recovered and 593 deaths.

=== Japan ===
16 January 2020, the first case was confirmed in a 30-year-old Chinese national who had previously travelled to Wuhan, developed a fever on 3 January, and returned to Japan on 6 January. He was a resident of the Kanagawa prefecture The first mass infection was confirmed on a cruise ship returning to Japan, with 713 cases and 13 deaths. The cruise ship left Yokohama on 20 January 2020 and called at Kagoshima, Hong Kong, Vietnam, Taiwan and Okinawa before returning to Yokohama on 3 February.

Since then, there have been 6 peaks of infection and death in Japan by February 2022, with the fifth being caused by the Delta variant and the sixth by the Omicron variant. As of February 2022, the total number of infected persons was about 4.16 million and the total number of deaths was about 21,000.

The 2020 Tokyo Olympics was postponed from July 2020 to July 2021 due to COVID-19. Around the same time as the Olympics began, the delta variant began to spread in Japan, marking the fifth peak in COVID-19 infections since the Games ended.

=== Jordan ===
On 2 March, the first case in the country was confirmed. Jordan has 212 confirmed infections on 26 March. Anyone who disobeys nightly curfew will be fined up to 500 dinars (around $700). The government placed Irbid under quarantine after it recorded 26 cases in the area.

=== Kazakhstan ===
On 13 March, the first two cases in the country were confirmed.

As of 10 June, there are 13,319 confirmed cases with 62 deaths.

=== Kuwait ===
The first case in the country was confirmed on 24 February.

The Kuwaiti prime minister stressed that the State of Kuwait greatly values the contribution of the large Indian community there and would continue to ensure their safety and welfare in the present situation, a statement issued by the Prime Minister's Office said.

Modi expressed his thanks and appreciation for the reassurance.

Both leaders discussed the domestic and international aspects of the ongoing COVID-19 pandemic, the statement said.

=== Kyrgyzstan ===
On 18 March, the first three cases in the country were confirmed. Kyrgyzstan had confirmed its first three coronavirus cases, Healthcare Minister Kosmosbek Cholponbayev said on Wednesday.

Three Kyrgyz nationals tested positive after arriving from Saudi Arabia.

=== Laos ===
As of 23 April, there are 19 confirmed cases in Laos.

=== Lebanon ===
On 21 February 2020, Lebanon confirmed the first case of COVID-19, a 45-year-old woman travelling from Qom, Iran tested positive for SARS-CoV-2 and was transferred to a hospital in Beirut. Lebanon had 386 cases and nine deaths through 25 March, when it instituted a lockdown through 12 April. Essential services, such as drugstores and supermarkets, must close at nightfall.

The number of COVID-19 infections remained unchanged at 333, NNA said.

Meanwhile, the cabinet decided to extend the curfew to 13 April, citing the increasing number of coronavirus infections.

=== Macau ===
The first case in Macau was confirmed on 22 January. As of 9 August, Macau has confirmed 46 cases, with all cases discharged.

=== Malaysia ===
Eight Chinese nationals were quarantined at a hotel in Johor Bahru on 24 January after coming into contact with an infected person in neighbouring Singapore. Despite early reports of them testing negative for the virus, three of them were confirmed to be infected on 25 January.

On 16 February, the 15th infected patient involving a Chinese female national had fully recovered, becoming the 8th patient cured from the virus in Malaysia. The following day, the first infected Malaysian also reportedly recovered, becoming the 9th cured.

In March 2020, several Southeast Asian countries experienced a significant rise in cases following an event held by Tablighi Jamaat at Jamek Mosque in Sri Petaling, Kuala Lumpur, where many people are believed to have been infected. By 17 March, almost two-thirds of the 673 cases confirmed in Malaysia were related to the event. More than 620 people, including those from other countries, who attended the event have tested positive, making it the largest-known centre of transmission in South East Asia. In response to the rapid spread of cases, the Government introduced Movement Control Order lockdown restrictions on 18 March 2020, which helped to lower the infection and death rates.

The number of active cases peaked in April and slowly declined, leading to a relaxation of Movement Control Order lockdown restrictions over the next several months. Since mid-September, an outbreak of cases in Sabah, Selangor, Negeri Sembilan, Johor, Penang and Kedah led to a resurgence of COVID-19 cases throughout the country. By 18 November 2020, the total number of cases in Malaysia had exceeded the 50,000 mark. A Sin Chew Daily editorial has attributed the rapid surge of cases to the failure of the public, businesses and their employees including migrant workers to practise health and social distancing procedures during the relaxation of Movement Control Order restrictions throughout 2020.

By 24 December 2020, the total number of cases in Malaysia had exceeded the 100,000 mark. By 6 January 2021, the number of recovered had exceeded 100,000. On the same day, the Director General reported there were 252 active clusters in Malaysia. In late February 2021, the Malaysian government launched a twelve-month immunization program, with Prime Minister Muhyiddin Yassin being the first individual to receive the COVID-19 vaccine.

By 22 May, the total number of cases had reached the 500,000 mark, reaching 505,115. By 2 June 2021, the total number of recoveries had exceeded the 500,000 mark, reaching 501,898. By 4 July, eight percent of the Malaysian population (roughly 2,618,316 people) had completed two doses of COVID-19 vaccination.

On 26 July, the total number of cases exceeded the one million mark, reaching 1,013,438. By 5 August, the death toll had reached the 10,000 mark, reaching 10,019. By 7 August, the total number of recoveries had reached the 1 million mark, reaching 1,009,343.

=== Maldives ===
On 7 March, the first two cases in the country were confirmed. By 21 July there are 3,252 confirmed cases in Maldives.

=== Mongolia ===
On 10 March, the first case have been confirmed, a 57-year-old French citizen came from Moscow-Ulaanbaatar flight on 2 March and symptoms were shown on 7 March.

=== Myanmar ===
On 23 March, Myanmar confirmed its first and second COVID-19 cases. Myanmar reported its first coronavirus death on 31 March, a 69-year-old man who also had cancer and died in a hospital in the commercial capital of Yangon, a government spokeswoman said.

He had sought medical treatment in Australia and stopped in Singapore on his way home, according to the health ministry.

After the coup d'état on 1 February 2021, testing collapsed and the medical response to COVID-19 in the country became severely hampered.

=== Nepal ===
A Nepali student who had returned to Kathmandu from Wuhan became the first case of the country and South Asia on 23 January 2020. The first case of local transmission inside the country was confirmed on 4 April, while the first COVID-19 death came on 14 May. The country observed an almost four-month-long nationwide lockdown between 24 March and 21 July. As of 26 July 2022, the country has a total of 984,475 cases, 968,802 recoveries, and 11,959 deaths.

=== North Korea ===
North Korea was one of the first countries to close borders due to COVID-19. In February 2020, wearing face masks was obligatory and visiting public places such as restaurants was forbidden. Ski resorts and spas were closed and military parades, marathons, and other public events were cancelled.

On 31 March 2020, the Asia Times reported that North Korea's measures against the pandemic seemed largely successful. Edwin Salvador, WHO's representative in North Korea, reported that as of 2 April 709 people had been tested, with no confirmed cases, and 509 people were in quarantine. On 23 April, US analyst website 38 North reported that North Korea's early and extensive response appeared to be successful in containing the virus.

Some anonymous reports claimed that North Korea was ineffective in curbing the disease, and that an order was enacted to 'spot and shoot', so as to hide the cases being reported nationwide. Rumours also spread that first cases were reported when three soldiers were found infected, and that they were shot to death.

On 8 May 2022, samples collected from a group of people experiencing fevers were tested positive for the Omicron variant.

On 12 May 2022, North Korea confirmed its first official COVID-19 outbreak and imposed a nationwide lockdown.

=== Oman ===
On 24 February, the first two cases in the country were confirmed. As of 22 July, there are a total of 69,887 confirmed cases, with 46,608 discharged and 337 deaths.

=== Pakistan ===
Pakistan reported its first two cases of COVID-19 on 26 February 2020. By early September 2020, Pakistan had the 10th-highest number of confirmed cases in Asia.

=== Palestine ===
The first seven cases were confirmed in the State of Palestine on 5 March.

=== Philippines ===
The COVID-19 pandemic in the Philippines was a part of the coronavirus disease 2019 (COVID-19) worldwide pandemic caused by severe acute respiratory syndrome coronavirus 2 (SARS-CoV-2). As of September 18, 2026, there have been 4,173,631 reported cases and 66,864 reported deaths, the fifth highest in Southeast Asia, behind Vietnam, Indonesia, Malaysia, and Thailand.

The first case in the Philippines was identified on January 30, 2020, involving a 38-year-old Chinese woman at San Lazaro Hospital in Metro Manila. (Note: The patient arrived in the Philippines from Wuhan, China via Hong Kong on January 21 and sought consultation on January 25 after experiencing a mild cough.) On February 1, 2020, a posthumous test result from a 44-year-old Chinese man returned positive for the virus, making the Philippines the first country outside China to record a confirmed death from the disease.

After over a month without recording any cases, the Philippines confirmed its first local transmission on March 7, 2020. The virus subsequently spread to every province in the country. National and local governments imposed community quarantines after March 15, 2020, to limit the spread of the virus, including the Luzon-wide enhanced community quarantine (ECQ) from March to May 2020. (Note: The first imposition of the ECQ in Luzon encompassed the whole island group.) On March 24, President Rodrigo Duterte signed the Bayanihan to Heal as One Act, granting him additional powers to handle the pandemic. This was repealed by the Bayanihan to Recover as One Act, which he signed on September 11.

The Philippines had a slightly lower testing capacity than its Southeast Asian neighbors during the first months of the pandemic. By the end of January 2020, the Research Institute for Tropical Medicine (RITM) in Muntinlupa, Metro Manila became the country's first COVID-19 testing laboratory; before this, samples had to be sent to Australia for testing. The Philippines' Department of Health (DOH) has since accredited 279 laboratories as capable of detecting the SARS-CoV-2 virus. As of September 10, 2021, 277 of these laboratories conducted 19,742,325 tests from over 18,551,810 unique individuals.

In February 2022, COVID-19 cases throughout the country started to decline, and by May 2022 the DOH noted that the country was at "minimal-risk case classification," with an average of only 159 cases per day recorded from May 3 to 9. As of early June 2022, 69.4 million Filipinos had been fully vaccinated, while 14.3 million individuals received their booster shots. In August 2022, Filipino public schools reopened for in-person learning for the first time in two years. As of February 23, 2023, a total of 170,545,638 vaccine doses were administered. On July 22, 2023, President Bongbong Marcos lifted the COVID-19 pandemic as a state of public health emergency.

On June 14, 2024, a Reuters exposé revealed the United States had launched a clandestine campaign in the Philippines at the height of the pandemic to undermine China's inoculation, vaccine, face masks, and testing kits. Its purpose was to counter China's growing sphere of influence in the country under the Duterte administration. The Philippines' DOH expressed the need for further investigations into the matter. A subsequent Reuters report found that the Embassy of China in Manila hired a local marketing firm to conduct a covert astroturfing social media campaign which included promoting CoronaVac in the country.

=== Qatar ===
Qatar confirmed its first case on 29 February, in a person who had returned from Iran. The first death in Qatar was recorded in on 28 March 2020, a 57-year-old Bangladeshi national who was already suffering from chronic disease.

=== Russia ===
Russia implemented preventive measures to curb the spread of COVID-19 in the country by imposing quarantines, carrying raids on potential virus carriers and using facial recognition to impose quarantine measures.

On 31 January, two cases were confirmed, one in Tyumen Oblast, another in Zabaykalsky Krai. Both were Chinese nationals, who have since recovered. By 17 April, first case was confirmed in the Altai Republic, thus all 27 federal subjects of Asian Russia had confirmed cases.

=== Saudi Arabia ===
On 27 February, Saudi Arabia announced temporary suspension of entry for individuals wanting to perform Umrah pilgrimage in Mecca or to visit the Prophet's Mosque in Medina, as well as tourists. The rule was also extended to visitors traveling from countries where SARS-CoV-2 posed a risk.

On 28 February, the Foreign Minister of Saudi Arabia announced a temporary suspension of entry for Gulf Cooperation Council (GCC) citizens to Mecca and Medina. Citizens of the GCC who had been in Saudi Arabia for more than 14 continuous days and didn't show any symptoms of COVID-19 would be excluded from this rule.

Saudi Arabia confirmed the first case on 2 March, a Saudi national returning from Iran via Bahrain.

On Thursday, 19 March Saudi Arabia suspended the holding of daily prayers and the weekly Friday prayers inside and outside the walls of the two mosques in Mecca and Medina to limit the spread of coronavirus. As of Thursday, 334 confirmed cases have been reported in Saudi Arabia with eight cases been recovered. No deaths have been reported.

On Friday, 20 March, Saudi Arabia announced it is going to suspend all domestic flights, buses, taxis and trains for 14 days amid the COVID-19 pandemic.

At the virtual G20 meeting, chaired by King Salman on 25 March, collective pledges were made to inject $4.8 trillion into the global economy to counteract the social and financial impacts of the pandemic.

On 26 March, authorities announced a total lockdown of Riyadh, Mecca and Medina, plus a nationwide curfew. 1,012 cases and four deaths are reported.

=== Singapore ===
The first case in Singapore was confirmed on 23 January 2020. Early cases were primarily imported until local transmission began to develop in February and March. In late March and April, COVID-19 clusters were detected at multiple migrant worker dormitories, which soon contributed to an overwhelming proportion of new cases in the country.

To stem the tide of infections, strict "circuit breaker" lockdown measures were implemented from 7 April to 1 June 2020, after which restrictions have been gradually lifted as conditions permitted. A mass vaccination campaign was launched, and has been successful in achieving a very high vaccination rate, with more than 96% of the eligible populace having completed their vaccination regimen as of June 2022. Various measures have been taken to mass test the population for the virus and isolate infected people. Contact tracing measures SafeEntry and TraceTogether were implemented to identify and quarantine close contacts of positive cases.

The last record of COVID-19 cases was on 4 June 2023, which was at 2,481,404 confirmed cases, 2,456,295 recoveries and 1,727 deaths, with a case fatality rate of 0.08%, one of the lowest in the world. It introduced what was considered one of the world's largest and best-organised epidemic control programmes.

=== South Korea ===
Epidemic curve of COVID-19 in South Korea

The first confirmed case in South Korea was announced 20 January 2020. The number of confirmed cases increased on 19 February by 20, and on 20 February by 58, giving a total of 346 confirmed cases on 21 February 2020, according to the Centers for Disease Control and Prevention Korea (KCDC), with the sudden jump mostly attributed to "Patient No. 31" who attended a gathering at a Shincheonji Church of Jesus the Temple of the Tabernacle of the Testimony church in Daegu. As of 20 February 2020, the number of confirmed cases in South Korea was the third largest after China and the infections on the Diamond Princess. By 24 February, the number of confirmed cases in South Korea was the second largest; as of 14 March 2020, the number was the fourth largest. A reason for the high number of confirmed cases is the high number of tests conducted. In South Korea more than 66,650 people were tested within a week of its first case of community transmission, and South Korea quickly became able to test 10,000 people a day.

=== Sri Lanka ===
Confirmed cases per districts

The first case in the country was confirmed on 27 January 2020. The country has 135,796 cases with 892 deaths as of 13 May 2021. As of 10 October 2020, Sri Lankan authorities have tracked down over 1,430,864 people who had contacted the identified patients and had ordered self quarantine for such people. Near tested 3 million PCR tested on 5 May 2021.

=== Syria ===
Due to Syria already coping with the rampant civil war, fearing that Syria will be the most affected country is raising concerns, following a number of cases found in neighboring Iraq, Lebanon and Jordan, and collapsed healthcare system as the result of the civil war. The Government of Iraqi Kurdistan, in a rare collaboration with its Syrian counterpart on 2 March, ordered complete closure of Syrian–Iraqi border to halt the spread.

The first case in Syria was confirmed on 22 March.

=== Taiwan ===
Confirmed cases per million residents by subdivision

The pandemic has had a smaller impact in Taiwan than in most other industrialized countries, with a total of eleven deaths out of a population of 23 million as of 11 April 2021, a rate of 0.042 deaths per 100,000 people. The number of active cases peaked on 6 April 2020 at 307 cases. Out of approximately 1,000 cases total, only 77 (along with one additional case of unknown origin) were infected within Taiwan due to strict border control and quarantine measures of incoming travelers and thorough contact tracing of all confirmed cases, allowing for minimal disruption of society, education, and industry. No lockdowns have been imposed in Taiwan. All the other cases have been imported from abroad.

=== Tajikistan ===
On 30 April 2020, the first 15 cases of COVID-19 were reported in Tajikistan.

=== Thailand ===
On 13 January, Thailand had its first case, also the first outside China.

On 1 March, the first confirmed death in Thailand was reported.

As of 19 July, there were a total of 3,246 confirmed cases with 58 deaths and 3,096 recoveries.

=== Timor-Leste ===
On 20 March, Timor-Leste confirmed its first COVID-19 case.

=== Turkey ===
The COVID-19 pandemic in Turkey is part of the ongoing pandemic of coronavirus disease 2019 (COVID-19) caused by severe acute respiratory syndrome coronavirus 2 (SARS-CoV-2).

The first case in Turkey was recorded on 11 March, when a local returned home (Note: Data Protection Law number 6698 precludes the Turkish Ministry of Health from disclosing sensitive patient health information, interpreted broadly to include location during the pandemic.) from a trip to Europe. The first death due to COVID-19 in the country occurred on 15 March. Turkey stood out from the rest of Europe by not ordering a legal lockdown (Note: Turkey's Article 11/C of the Law on Public Health authorizes only provinces to order quarantines, for a maximum period of 15 days. The national government is barred by the constitution from ordering lockdowns.) until April 2021, when the country enacted its first nationwide restrictions. The government kept many businesses open, and allowed companies to set their own guidelines for workers.

The Turkish health system has the highest number of intensive care units in the world at 46.5 beds per 100,000 people (compared to 9.6 in Greece, 11.6 in France, and 12.6 in Italy). As of 3 May 2021, Turkey's observed case-fatality rate stood at 0.84%, the 148th highest rate globally. This low case-fatality rate has generated various explanations, including the relative rarity of nursing homes, favorable demographics, a long legacy of contact tracing, the high number of intensive care units, universal health care, and a lockdown regime that led to a higher proportion of positive cases among working-age adults. But according to an August 2020 academic study by The International Journal of Health Planning and Management, the government of Turkey has been underreporting COVID-19 statistics.

On 30 September 2020, Turkish Minister of Health Fahrettin Koca acknowledged that since 29 July, the reported number of cases was limited to symptomatic cases that required monitoring, which was met with rebuke by the Turkish Medical Association. This practice ended on 25 November, when the ministry started to report asymptomatic and mildly symptomatic cases alongside symptomatic ones.

=== United Arab Emirates ===
The first case in the United Arab Emirates was confirmed on 29 January 2020. It was the first country in the Middle East to report a confirmed case.

The first death due to COVID-19 was reported on 20 March 2020.

=== Uzbekistan ===
On 15 March, the first case in the country was confirmed.

=== Vietnam ===
Cities and provinces in Vietnam with confirmed COVID-19 cases

The first two confirmed cases in Vietnam were admitted to Cho Ray Hospital, Ho Chi Minh City on 23 January 2020: a 66-year-old Chinese man traveling from Wuhan to Hanoi to visit his son, and his son who believed to have contracted the virus from his father when they met in Nha Trang.

On 21 March, Vietnam suspended entry for all foreigners from midnight of 22 March, and concentrated isolation for 14 days in all cases of entry for Vietnamese citizens. From 1 April, Vietnam implemented nationwide isolation for 15 days.

=== Yemen ===
The pandemic was confirmed to have spread to Yemen when its first confirmed case in Hadhramaut was reported on 10 April.

The country is seen to be extremely vulnerable to the outbreak, given the dire humanitarian situation due to the civil war, exacerbated by the famine, cholera outbreaks, and military blockade by Saudi Arabia and allies.

== Prevention in other countries and territories ==
=== Turkmenistan ===
As of May 2020, there are no confirmed COVID-19 cases in Turkmenistan. The government has censored use of the word "coronavirus" to control information about the virus, and experts suspect that it may be spreading in the country unreported.

Turkmenistan is a notoriously opaque state, purposefully isolated by an authoritarian regime led by former president Gurbanguly Berdimuhamedow, who has also been described as totalitarian. Independent media in the country is virtually nonexistent so reporting about the current situation is difficult due to the inability to access and confirm reliable information from the country.

== See also ==
- COVID-19 pandemic by country and territory

== Notes ==
Map Notes
