= Division of Solomon =

Australian federal electoral division

Coordinates: 12.423°S 130.936°E

Solomon Australian House of Representatives Division
- Interactive map of boundaries since the 2025 federal election
- Created: 2000
- MP: Luke Gosling
- Party: Labor
- Namesake: Vaiben Louis Solomon
- Electors: 71,888 (2022)
- Area: 337 km^{2} (130.1 sq mi)
- Demographic: Inner metropolitan
- Territory electorates: List: Blain; Brennan; Casuarina; Drysdale; Fannie Bay; Fong Lim; Johnston; Karama; Nelson; Nightcliff; Port Darwin; Sanderson; Spillett; Wanguri
Electorates around Solomon:
Indian Ocean	Indian Ocean	Indian Ocean
Indian Ocean	Solomon	Lingiari
Indian Ocean	Lingiari	Lingiari

The Division of Solomon is an Australian electoral division in the Northern Territory. It is largely coextensive with the Darwin/Palmerston metropolitan area. The only other division in the territory, the Division of Lingiari, covers the remainder of the territory.

Since 2016 its MP has been Luke Gosling of the Labor Party.

== Geography ==
Federal electoral division boundaries in Australia are determined at redistributions by a redistribution committee appointed by the Australian Electoral Commission. Redistributions occur for the boundaries of divisions in a particular state or territory, and they occur every seven years, or sooner if a state or territory's representation entitlement changes or when divisions of a state or territory are malapportioned.

Since the 2024 redistribution, the division is co-extensive with the City of Darwin and City of Palmerston local government areas, as well as the Darwin Waterfront Precinct and the unincorporated Northern Territory Rates Act Area.

== History ==
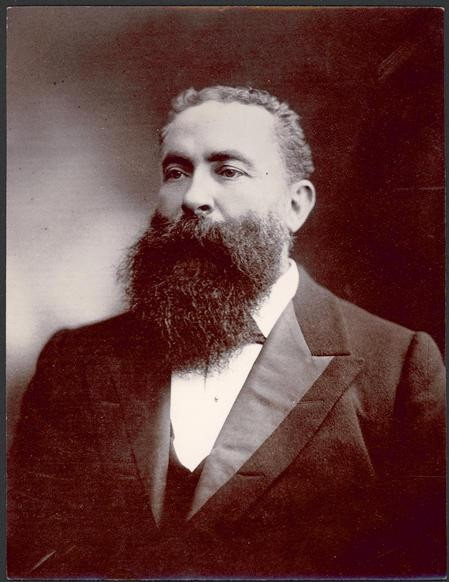
Vaiben Louis Solomon, the division's namesake

The division was one of the two established when the former Division of Northern Territory was redistributed on 21 December 2000. It is named for Hon Vaiben Louis Solomon, a Premier of South Australia, a delegate to the second Constitutional convention and member of the first Australian Parliament. He had represented the Northern Territory in the South Australian House of Assembly, when it was still part of that colony.

The Division was first contested at the 2001 federal election. Although the Darwin/Palmerston area had historically been a stronghold for the Country Liberal Party at the territorial level, recent gains by Labor made it much more competitive by the time the seat was created. It has taken on a character similar to mortgage belt seats. As such, for most of its history, it has been a marginal seat usually held by the party of government.

The CLP's Dave Tollner very narrowly won the seat in 2001, then increased his majority in 2004 before narrowly losing it to Labor's Damian Hale at the 2007 election, where Labor won a landslide victory. At the 2010 election, the CLP's Natasha Griggs won Solomon back with a two-party-preferred margin of 1.75 percent from a 1.94 percent swing. She therefore became the first opposition member in the seat's history. Griggs was re-elected with a reduced two-party margin of 1.4 percent at the 2013 election as the Coalition won government.

A MediaReach seat-level opinion poll in Solomon of 513 voters conducted 22−23 June during the 2016 election campaign unexpectedly found Labor heavily leading the Liberals 61–39 on the two-party vote from a large 12.4 percent swing.

Griggs and the CLP lost Solomon to Labor's Luke Gosling, at the 2016 election held on 2 July, with Gosling becoming the first Labor candidate to win the primary vote and defeating Griggs on a 56–44 two-party vote from a record 7.4 percent swing—in both cases, the strongest result in the seat's history. Gosling, who had previously run in 2013, is the second opposition member to hold the seat. This was later seen as a forerunner to the CLP's disastrous performance at the NT general election held later that year, where the party won just 2 seats out of 25, including only one in the Darwin area. Gosling retained the seat in 2019 with a reduced majority, but won in 2022 by a margin just under the threshold for making Solomon a safe Labor seat.

== Members ==
Image	Member	Party	Term	Notes
	Dave Tollner (1966–)	Country Liberal	10 November 2001 – 24 November 2007	Lost seat. Later elected to the Northern Territory Legislative Assembly seat of Fong Lim in 2008
	Damian Hale (1969–)	Labor	24 November 2007 – 21 August 2010	Lost seat
	Natasha Griggs (1969–)	Country Liberal	21 August 2010 – 2 July 2016	Lost seat
	Luke Gosling (1971–)	Labor	2 July 2016 – present	Incumbent

== Election results ==
2025 Australian federal election: Solomon
Party	Candidate	Votes	%	±%
Country Liberal	Lisa Bayliss	21,642	35.99	+10.28
Labor	Luke Gosling	19,751	32.85	−5.97
Independent	Phil Scott	7,501	12.47	+12.47
Greens	Jonathan Parry	6,167	10.26	−4.28
One Nation	Benjamin Craker	4,033	6.71	+1.28
Independent	Janey Davies	693	1.15	+1.15
Citizens	Brian Kristo	343	0.57	+0.49
Total formal votes		60,130	96.41	+0.10
Informal votes		2,240	3.59	−0.10
Turnout		62,370	79.25	+0.49
Two-candidate-preferred result
Labor	Luke Gosling	30,853	51.31	−7.09
Country Liberal	Lisa Bayliss	29,277	48.69	+7.09
Labor hold		Swing	−7.09	
