= COVID-19 pandemic in Christmas Island =

Ongoing viral pandemic in Christmas Island

- Disease: COVID-19
- Pathogen: SARS-CoV-2
- Location: Christmas Island
- Arrival date: 6 March 2022
- Confirmed cases: 493
- Active cases: 47
- Recovered: 446
- Deaths: 0

Government website
- https://indianoceanterritories.com.au/news/

The COVID-19 pandemic in Christmas Island is part of the ongoing worldwide pandemic of coronavirus disease 2019 (COVID-19) caused by severe acute respiratory syndrome coronavirus 2 (SARS-CoV-2). The virus was confirmed to have reached Christmas Island on 6 March 2022.

== Background ==
On 12 January 2020, the World Health Organization (WHO) confirmed that a novel coronavirus was the cause of a respiratory illness in a cluster of people in Wuhan City, Hubei Province, China, which was reported to the WHO on 31 December 2019.

The case fatality ratio for COVID-19 has been much lower than SARS of 2003, but the transmission has been significantly greater, with a significant total death toll.

Christmas Island along with the Cocos (Keeling) Islands constitute the Australian Indian Ocean Territories. Christmas Island was formerly part of the Straits Settlements until they were transferred to Australia during the 1950s. As an Australian dependency, the island is not self-governing, but has its own local government.

== Timeline ==
=== March 2022 ===
On 6 March 2022, a traveller from Australia tested positive for COVID-19.

On 9 March, a new positive case (not related with the first case) was confirmed on a passenger who had traveled from Australia.

On 12 March, two new cases are reported.

On 19 March, the Christmas Island reported one new case, bringing the total number to eight. There were a total of three recoveries.

On 21 March, Christmas Island reported three new cases and five new recoveries.

On 23 March, Christmas Island reported two new recoveries, bringing the total number of recoveries to five.

On 27 March, one new recovery was reported on Christmas Island, bringing the total number of recoveries to eight.

On 29 March, one new case was reported, bringing the total number of cases to 11.

=== April 2022 ===
On 1 April, one new case was reported, bringing the total number of cases to 12. That same day, Administrator Natasha Griggs identified the Christmas Island Recreation Centre as a casual contact exposure centre.

On 4 April, one new cases was reported, bringing the total number of cases to 13.

== See also ==
- COVID-19 pandemic in Asia
