= Responses to the COVID-19 pandemic in March 2022 =

Aspect of viral disease pandemic

This article documents the chronology of the response to the COVID-19 pandemic in March 2022, originating in Wuhan, China in December 2019. Some developments may become known or fully understood only in retrospect. Reporting on this pandemic began in December 2019.

== Reactions and measures in South, East and Southeast Asia ==
=== 8 March ===
- Malaysian Prime Minister Ismail Sabri Yaakob has announced that Malaysia will fully reopen its borders to foreign travellers from 1 April. Fully vaccinated travellers will be allowed to enter the country with having to undergo quarantine.

== Reactions and measures in the Western Pacific ==
=== 1 March ===
- The New Zealand Cabinet has approved the Novavax COVID-19 vaccine for people aged 18 and above. The first doses are expected to arrive in the country in March 2022.

=== 9 March ===
- New Zealand COVID-19 Response Minister Chris Hipkins announced that the isolation period for COVID-19 positive cases and household contacts would be reduced from ten days to seven days from 11:59pm on 11 March 2022.

=== 16 March ===
- New Zealand will allow fully-vaccinated tourists from Australia to enter the country from 13 April 2022 without having to go into managed or self-isolation.

=== 18 March ===
- American Samoa's Department of Health has suspended all flights to the Manu'a Islands after 800 cases were reported on the main island of Tutuila.
- The Vanuatu Government has imposed a curfew in commercial stores and ordered the closure of roadside food stalls and kava bars in response to a surge in cases nationwide.

=== 23 March ===
- New Zealand Prime Minister Jacinda Ardern announced that the Government would ease outdoor and indoor gathering restrictions by 11:59pm on 25 March 2022. In addition, vaccine pass requirements and the vaccine mandates for educators, Police, and Defence Force personnel would be eliminated from 11:59pm on 4 April.

== See also ==
- Timeline of the COVID-19 pandemic in March 2022
- Responses to the COVID-19 pandemic
