= COVID-19 pandemic in the Cocos (Keeling) Islands =

Part of the ongoing worldwide pandemic of coronavirus disease 2019

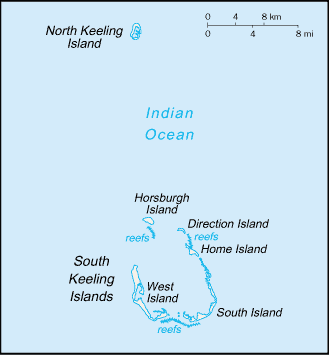
- Disease: COVID-19
- Pathogen: SARS-CoV-2
- Location: Cocos (Keeling) Islands
- Arrival date: 19 March 2022
- Confirmed cases: 242
- Recovered: 236
- Deaths: 0

Government website
- https://indianoceanterritories.com.au/news/

The COVID-19 pandemic in the Cocos (Keeling) Islands is part of the ongoing worldwide pandemic of coronavirus disease 2019 (COVID-19) caused by severe acute respiratory syndrome coronavirus 2 (SARS-CoV-2). The virus was confirmed to have reached the Cocos (Keeling) Islands on 19 March 2022.

== Background ==
On 12 January 2020, the World Health Organization (WHO) confirmed that a novel coronavirus was the cause of a respiratory illness in a cluster of people in Wuhan City, Hubei Province, China, which was reported to the WHO on 31 December 2019.

The case fatality ratio for COVID-19 has been much lower than SARS of 2003, but the transmission has been significantly greater, with a significant total death toll.

The Cocos (Keeling) Islands along with Christmas Island constitute the Australian Indian Ocean Territories. The Cocos (Keeling) Islands were formerly part of the Straits Settlements until they were transferred to Australia during the 1950s. As Australian dependencies, they are not self-governing but do have their own local government.

== Timeline ==
=== March 2022 ===
On 19 March 2022, the territory reported its first case of COVID-19.

On 21 March, the Cocos (Keeling) Islands reported one new case, bringing the total number of cases to two.

On 26 March, one of the two positive cases recovered.

On 29 March, the second remaining positive case recovered from COVID-19.

=== April 2022 ===
On 1 April, one new case was reported, bringing the total number of cases to three.

On 3 April, Administrator Natasha Griggs identified Pondok Indah and the Home Island House as casual exposure sites in the island territory. That same day, Griggs identified the Shire of Cocos Keeling Islands Home Island Office as another casual exposure site.

== See also ==
- COVID-19 pandemic in Asia
