= Damian Hale =

Australian politician (born 1969)

Member of the Australian Parliament for Solomon
- In office 24 November 2007 – 21 August 2010
- Preceded by: Dave Tollner
- Succeeded by: Natasha Griggs

Personal details
- Born: 28 December 1969 (age 56) Ipswich, Queensland
- Party: Australian Labor Party
- Occupation: Australian rules footballer

Damian Francis Hale (born 28 December 1969) is an Australian politician who was an Australian Labor Party member of the House of Representatives, representing the Division of Solomon from 2007 to 2010.

Hale moved to the Northern Territory in 1974 and grew up in Maningrida, Katherine and Darwin, with his teacher parents, Bob and Bev Hale. While growing up he was actively involved in sports, representing the Northern Territory in rugby league and Australian rules football. He later coached St Mary's Football Club to three premierships (2003-5) in the Northern Territory Football League. He has five children.

Hale won the marginal seat of Solomon for the Australian Labor Party at the 2007 Australia federal election, defeating sitting Country Liberal Party member Dave Tollner. Hale won an extremely close preselection process which included a letter of support from Labor leader Kevin Rudd despite Rudd having never met Hale.

In June 2007, Hale was involved in an altercation with Fremantle Football Club player Chris Tarrant in a popular Darwin nightspot. Hale received a black eye when he was struck by Tarrant after intervening when the inebriated Tarrant exposed his buttocks to a female colleague of Hale.

Hale contested the 2016 Northern Territory election in the seat of Blain, which had been vacated by Nathan Barrett. He finished first on the primary vote, ahead of former Country Liberal Party Chief Minister Terry Mills, who ran for his old seat as an independent. However, despite the massive Labor wave that swept through Darwin/Palmerston, Mills defeated Hale on CLP preferences.

Parliament of Australia
Preceded by Dave Tollner	Member for Solomon; 2007–2010	Succeeded by Natasha Griggs
