= Luke Gosling =

Australian politician (born 1971)

Luke Gosling OAM, MP

Member of the Australian Parliament for Solomon
- Incumbent
- Assumed office 2 July 2016
- Preceded by: Natasha Griggs

Personal details
- Born: 17 September 1971 (age 55) Melbourne, Australia
- Party: Australian Labor Party
- Spouse: Kate Sieper
- Children: 2
- Education: University of New South Wales (BA)
- Occupation: Politician
- Awards: Medal of the Order of Australia; Medal of Merit (Timor-Leste)
- Website: www.lukegosling.com.au

Luke John Anthony Gosling (born 17 September 1971) is an Australian politician and retired Australian Army officer. Gosling has been the Australian Labor Party member for the Australian House of Representatives seat of Solomon in the Northern Territory since the 2016 federal election.

== Background ==
Gosling is the eldest of eight children. He has a Bachelor of Arts in history and politics from the University of New South Wales.

Gosling served in the Australian Defence Force (ADF) for 13 years in the Parachute Infantry, Commandos and Defence Cooperation Programs. During his service he deployed to Papua New Guinea, Malaysia and Timor-Leste.

After leaving the army, Gosling worked abroad in countries such as Afghanistan, Cambodia, Albania and Timor-Leste. He co-founded Life, Love and Health, a not-for-profit, non-governmental organisation, an Australian charity for Timor-Leste. For his work with the NGO, he was awarded the Medal of the Order of Australia in 2006 regarding relief work in the 2006 humanitarian crisis. He received the Medal of Merit from the President of Timor-Leste in 2009.

Gosling established the Remote Area Health Corps in 2008. He has worked at Saint Vincent de Paul as a volunteer after serving as the Darwin CEO of the organisation.

== Political career ==
=== 2013 election ===
Gosling ran for the Darwin-based seat of Solomon as a Labor candidate at the 2013 federal election, but was narrowly defeated by one-term Country Liberal incumbent Natasha Griggs. Gosling received a 48.6 percent two-party vote after gaining a 0.4-point two-party swing.

=== 2016 election ===
Gosling ran for Solomon again at the 2016 federal election. A MediaReach seat-level opinion poll of 513 voters in Solomon conducted one week before the Saturday 2 July 2016 election found Gosling heavily leading Griggs 61–39 on the two-party vote from a large 12.4-point swing.

Gosling defeated Griggs on 56 percent two-party vote after gaining a 7.4-point two-party swing.

The federal election came at a bad time for the CLP government in the Territory, whose poll numbers had suffered after numerous cabinet reshuffles and leadership spills. Gosling's victory foreshadowed his party's landslide victory at the 2016 Territory election, at which Labor won the third-largest majority government in the history of the Territory–including all but one seat within Solomon's borders.

Gosling made national headlines during the election campaign by using photographs from his past army service in his campaign materials. The Australian Defence Force issued a directive to retract any advertising showing him in military uniform. Gosling defended use of the photographs, stating the claimed restrictions on their use did not apply as he was "no longer a member of Defence".

=== 2022 election ===
Gosling was re-elected for a third term after defeating CLP candidate Tina MacFarlane at the 2022 federal election. A first-time occurrence for the seat as no MP had served for more than two terms.

=== 2025 election ===
Following his re-election in the 2025 federal election, Gosling was named Special Envoy for Defence, Veterans' Affairs and Northern Australia in the second Albanese ministry. He resigned as Special Envoy for Defence, Veterans' Affairs and Northern Australia on 26 August 2026 due to an alleged assault on the Northern Territory administrator David Connolly.

== Personal life ==
Gosling is married and has two children.

Gosling was arrested on 30 July 2026 due to an alleged assault on the Northern Territory administrator David Connolly at a festival in Darwin on 18 July. He was charged with breaching his bail conditions on 14 August, though the charge was later dropped by the prosecution. Gosling was cautioned for breaking his bail conditions in a separate incident on 1 September, though the NT Police later admitted in a document leaked to News24 that it may have been a case of mistaken identity.

Parliament of Australia
Preceded by Natasha Griggs	Member for Solomon; 2016–present	Incumbent
