= Natasha Griggs =

Australian politician

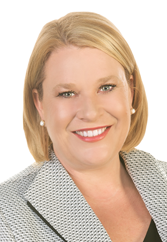
- Griggs in 2014

President of the Country Liberal Party
- In office 16 February 2025 – 11 October 2025
- Leader: Lia Finocchiaro
- Preceded by: Shane Stone
- Succeeded by: Nathan Land

Administrator of the Australian Indian Ocean Territories
- In office 5 October 2017 – 4 October 2022
- Monarchs: Elizabeth II; Charles III
- Governors-General: Peter Cosgrove; David Hurley
- Preceded by: Barry Haase
- Succeeded by: Sarah Vandenbroek (acting)

Member of the Australian Parliament for Solomon
- In office 21 August 2010 – 2 July 2016
- Preceded by: Damian Hale
- Succeeded by: Luke Gosling

Personal details
- Born: Natasha Louise Griggs; 24 January 1969 (age 57) Adelaide, South Australia
- Party: Liberal
- Other political affiliations: Country Liberal
- Spouse: Paul Griggs
- Children: 1
- Education: Northern Territory University
- Occupation: Politician

Natasha Louise Griggs (born 24 January 1969) is an Australian former politician and the administrator of the Australian Indian Ocean Territories from 2017 to 2022.

Griggs was first elected at the 2010 federal election as a member of the House of Representatives for the division of Solomon, representing the Country Liberal Party. She sat with the Liberal Party in federal parliament. She was re-elected at the 2013 federal election, but lost her seat to Labor candidate Luke Gosling at the 2016 federal election. From February 2025 to October 2025, she served as the president of the Country Liberal Party.

== Background ==
Griggs was born in Adelaide, moved to the Northern Territory when she was four weeks old and attended primary and secondary schools in Alice Springs before moving to Darwin in 1987 to complete a Bachelor of Business at the Northern Territory University (now Charles Darwin University).

She started her working life in the Northern Territory government in the IT sector. Before her election to public office she had a career in both the Government and private sectors, holding both senior project and business manager positions. In 2002 Griggs was diagnosed with thyroid cancer, undergoing six months of intensive treatment. She beat the illness and returned to work. She remains an advocate for charities and NGO's focused around cancer prevention, research and treatment. Beyond this, Griggs has long been a prominent advocate for community and non-profit organisations, raising $30,000 and being named the Territory's leading fundraiser in 1992.

Griggs stood as an Alderman in 2008 and won election to the Palmerston City Council, during which she was elected by her colleagues to the position of deputy mayor.

== Political career ==
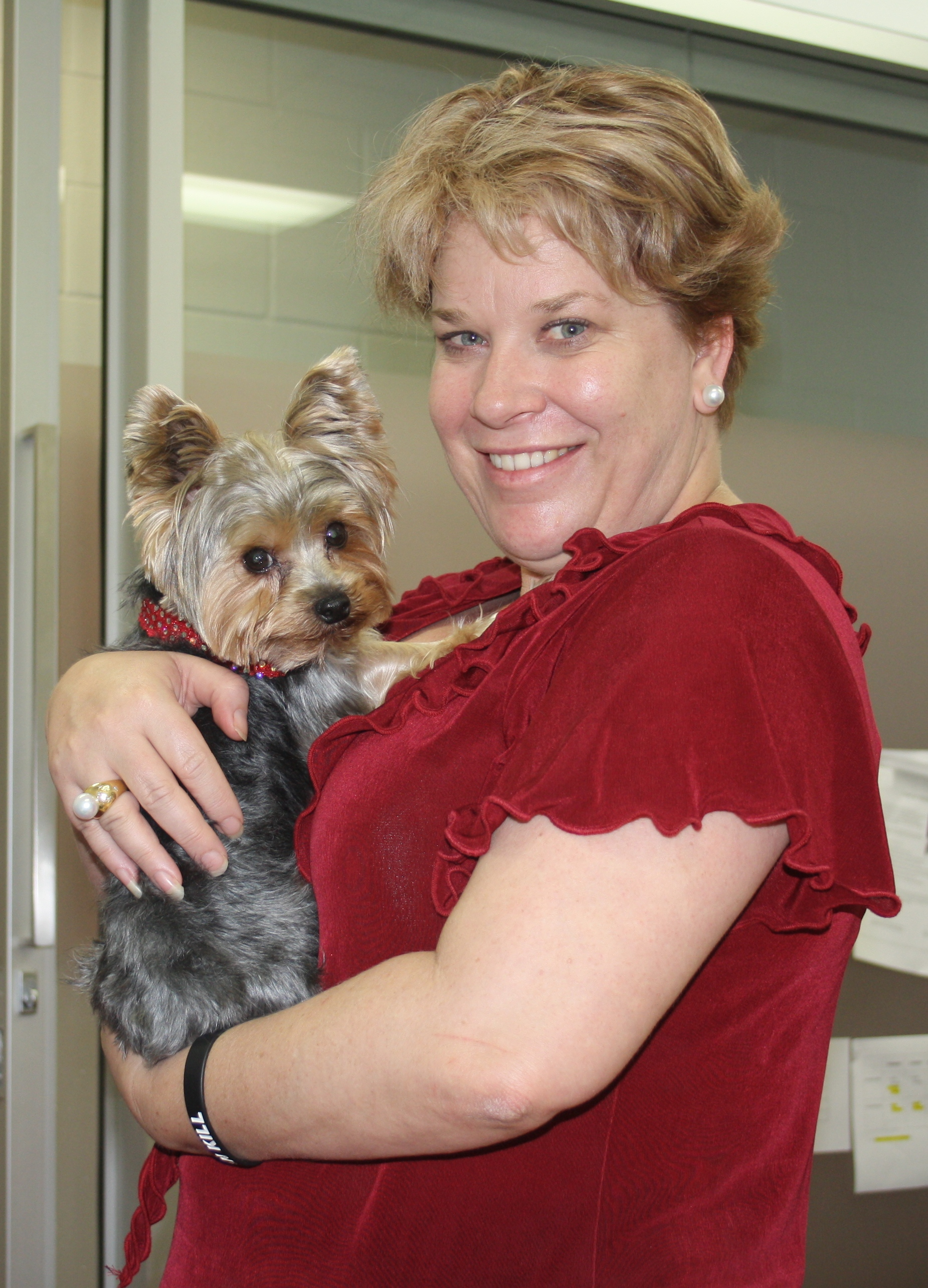
Griggs in 2011

In 2009 she won Country Liberals pre-selection for Solomon, the marginal Labor seat that had been held by Damian Hale since the 2007 election. At the 2010 election, she won with a two-party-preferred margin of 1.75 percent from a 1.94 percent swing. She therefore became the first opposition member in the seat's history. She became the first female member of the House of Representatives to represent the Northern Territory. She also sat with the Liberal Party in federal parliament. During her first term she opposed the construction of a nuclear waste facility in the Northern Territory arguing that science, and not politics, should determine its location.

Griggs also campaigned strongly against the removal of houses from RAAF Base Darwin, championed the need for on-going support for Defence Force personnel returning home from deployment overseas and gained bi-partisan support to have 19 February, Bombing of Darwin Day, declared a National Day of Observance.

Between 2010 and 2013 Griggs was a member of three parliamentary committees: the House of Representatives Standing Aboriginal and Torres Strait Islander Affairs Committee, the Joint Standing National Capital and External Territories Committee and the Joint Select Australia's Immigration Detention Network Committee.

Griggs was re-elected with a reduced two-party margin of 1.4 percent at the 2013 election as the Coalition won government. Griggs remained a backbencher.

Griggs was one of the founding members of Riding for the Disabled NT. She is Patron of SIDS and Kids NT.

Griggs was a supporter of Liberal Party leader and Prime Minister Tony Abbott and supported the latter in the party's leadership spill against him in September 2015. After Abbott was ousted and replaced by Malcolm Turnbull in the spill, Griggs said that Turnbull now had her loyalty as she was "very loyal" to her leader, and "it doesn't matter who the leader is".

=== 2016 election ===
Griggs made national headlines two weeks out from the 2016 election after physically taking exception to being filmed on a smartphone at a public local community event. The footage, widely published since, showed Griggs approaching the smartphone user and appearing to act in what was described as a "hostile" and "aggressive" manner, telling the smartphone user to "don't video me!" shortly before appearing to make direct contact with the owner's device which was reported to have hit the ground. Griggs claimed that she was the victim of a "union set-up."

A MediaReach seat-level opinion poll in Solomon of 513 voters conducted 22−23 June during the 2016 election campaign unexpectedly found Labor heavily leading the Liberals 61–39 on the two-party vote from a large 12.4 percent swing.

At the election, Griggs was heavily defeated by her 2013 Labor opponent, Luke Gosling, at the 2016 election held on 2 July, with Gosling defeating Griggs on a 56–44 two-party vote from a 7.4 percent swing—in both cases, historic Solomon records.

The federal election came at a very bad time for the CLP government in the Territory, whose reputation had suffered from a series of cabinet reshuffles—including multiple leadership spills. As it turned out, Griggs' defeat foreshadowed the CLP's massive defeat at the 2016 Territory election. The CLP suffered a near-meltdown in the Darwin/Palmerston area—which is virtually coextensive with Solomon—losing all but one seat there.

== Indian Ocean Territories ==
Griggs was appointed the Administrator of the Territories of Christmas Island and the Cocos (Keeling) Islands on 5 October 2017. In response to the COVID-19 pandemic, Griggs declared a state of emergency in the territories on 18 March 2020. Entry was only allowed for local residents and essential staff, and a self-isolation period of 14 days was required for any arrivals.

== Personal life ==
Griggs lives in Palmerston with her husband Paul.

Parliament of Australia
Preceded by Damian Hale	Member for Solomon; 2010–2016	Succeeded by Luke Gosling
Government offices
Preceded by Barry Haase	Administrator of the Australian Indian Ocean Territories; 2017–2022	Succeeded by Sarah Vandenbroek (acting)
