= Opinion polling for the 2016 Australian federal election =

Several research and polling firms conducted polls during the parliamentary term and prior to the 2016 Australian federal election on 2 July in relation to voting intention for the Australian House of Representatives (lower house) and leader ratings. Most firms use the flow of preferences at the previous election to determine the two-party-preferred vote; others ask respondents to nominate their second preference before applying the preference flows at the previous election.

Every federal election after 1961 has been won by the grouping that also won the majority of federal seats in New South Wales. Unusually, in the upcoming election nearly half of all marginal government seats are in NSW; of these, nearly half are in Western Sydney and half are in rural and regional areas. No more than a few government seats in each other state are marginal.

Assuming a theoretical uniform swing, for the Labor opposition to get to 76 seats and majority government would require at least 50.5 percent of the two-party vote (a 4.0-point two-party swing or greater), while for the incumbent Coalition to lose majority government would require 50.2 percent of the two-party vote (a 3.3-point two-party swing or greater).

== Graphical aggregate of national voting intention polling ==
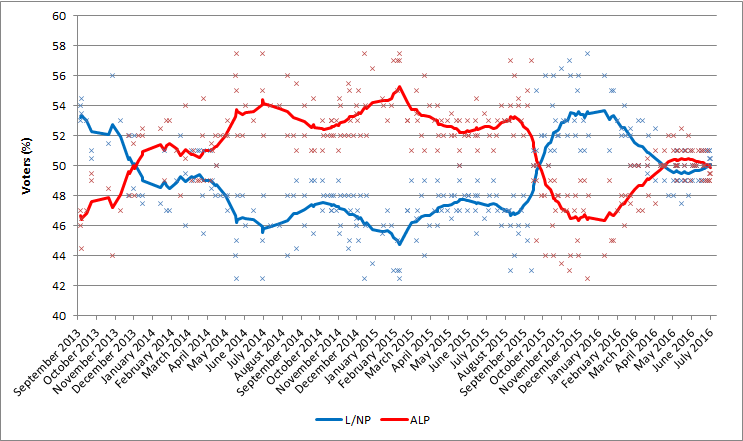
Two-party-preferred vote.

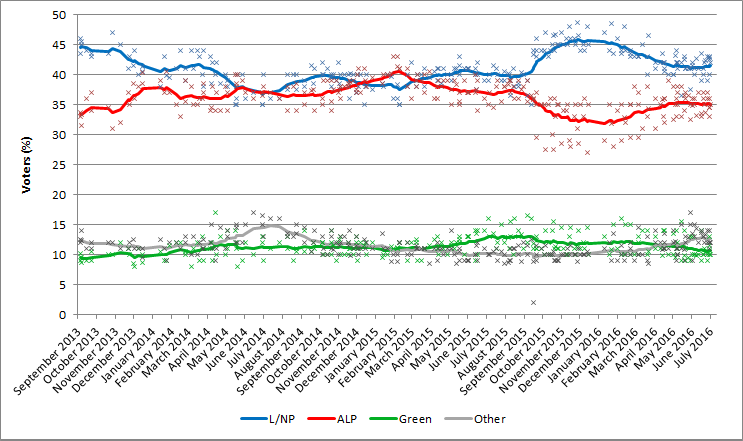
Primary vote.

Graphs are a compilation of aggregate data from voting intention in the below list of all opinion polling for the 2016 federal election. A moving average is shown in a solid line.

== Federal two-party-preferred polling aggregates by state ==
The table below published by The Poll Bludger sets out the final release of federal two-party-preferred polling aggregates by state/territory (and swings since the previous election).

Two-party-preferred % polling aggregates by state
| State (seats) | L/NP 2PP | ALP 2PP | L/NP swing |
|---|---|---|---|
| New South Wales (47) | 51.3 | 48.7 | –3.1 |
| Victoria (37) | 47.6 | 52.4 | –2.2 |
| Queensland (30) | 52.7 | 47.3 | –4.3 |
| Western Australia (16) | 54.2 | 45.8 | –4.1 |
| South Australia (11) | 53.8 | 46.2 | +1.4 |
| Tasmania (5) | 47.3 | 52.7 | –1.4 |
| ACT & NT (4) | 40.4 | 59.6 | –2.7 |
| Australia (150) | 50.9 | 49.1 | –2.6 |

Source: BludgerTrack 1 Jul 2016: Poll Bludger – Methodology – State 2PP history

== National polling ==
=== Voting intention ===
| Date | Firm | Primary vote | | | | 2PP vote | | Sample size | Margin of error | Method |
| | | L/NP | ALP | GRN | OTH | L/NP | ALP |
|---|---|---|---|---|---|---|---|---|---|---|
| Election | | 42% | 34.7% | 10.2% | 13% | 50.4% | 49.6% | 13,541,101 |
| 28 Jun – 1 Jul 2016 | Newspoll | 42% | 35% | 10% | 13% | 50.5% | 49.5% | 4,135 | ? | Landline |
| 30 Jun 2016 | ReachTEL | 42.8% | 34.6% | 10.7% | 12% | 51% | 49% | 2,084 | ? | Telephone (random) |
| 27–30 Jun 2016 | Essential | 42.5% | 34.5% | 11.5% | 12% | 50.5% | 49.5% | 1,212 | ±3 | Online (members) |
| 28–29 Jun 2016 | Galaxy | 43% | 36% | 10% | 11% | 51% | 49% | 1,768 | ? | Landline |
| 26–29 Jun 2016 | Ipsos | 40% | 33% | 13% | 14% | 50% | 50% | 1,377 | ? | Telephone (random) |
| 23–26 Jun 2016 | Essential | 39% | 37% | 10% | 14% | 49% | 51% | 1,773 | ±3 | Online (members) |
| 23–26 Jun 2016 | Newspoll | 43% | 36% | 9% | 12% | 51% | 49% | 1,713 | ±3 | Landline |
| 23 Jun 2016 | ReachTEL | 42.3% | 33.7% | 10.5% | 13.3% | 51% | 49% | 2,349 | ? | Telephone (random) |
| 20–22 Jun 2016 | Galaxy | 42% | 35% | 11% | 12% | 50% | 50% | ? | ? | Landline |
| 16–19 Jun 2016 | Essential | 40% | 37% | 10% | 13% | 49% | 51% | 1,013 | ±3 | Online (members) |
| 16–19 Jun 2016 | Newspoll | 41% | 36% | 10% | 13% | 50% | 50% | 1,805 | ±3 | Landline |
| 16 Jun 2016 | ReachTEL | 43.5% | 33.6% | 9.1% | 13.7% | 51% | 49% | 2,576 | ? | Telephone (random) |
| 14–16 Jun 2016 | Ipsos | 39% | 33% | 14% | 14% | 49% | 51% | 1,437 | ? | Telephone (random) |
| 9–12 Jun 2016 | Essential | 41% | 37% | 10% | 12% | 49% | 51% | 1,784 | ±3 | Online (members) |
| 9 Jun 2016 | ReachTEL | 42.7% | 33.2% | 9.9% | 14.3% | 50% | 50% | 2,175 | ? | Telephone (random) |
| 2–5 Jun 2016 | Essential | 41% | 36% | 10% | 13% | 50% | 50% | 1,772 | ±3 | Online (members) |
| 2–5 Jun 2016 | Newspoll | 40% | 35% | 10% | 15% | 50% | 50% | 1,867 | ±3 | Landline |
| 2 Jun 2016 | ReachTEL | 41.5% | 34.9% | 10.1% | 13.5% | 50% | 50% | 2,414 | ? | Telephone (random) |
| 31 May – 2 Jun 2016 | Ipsos | 42% | 36% | 13% | 9% | 49% | 51% | 1,359 | ±2.7 | Telephone (random) |
| 26–29 May 2016 | Essential | 41% | 35% | 9% | 15% | 51% | 49% | 1,767 | ±3 | Online (members) |
| 21–22, 28–29 May 2016 | Morgan | 37.5% | 32.5% | 13% | 17% | 49% | 51% | 3,099 | ±1 | In person and SMS |
| 26 May 2016 | ReachTEL | 41.1% | 36.5% | 9.6% | 12.8% | 48% | 52% | 2,700 | ? | Telephone (random) |
| 19–22 May 2016 | Essential | 41% | 37% | 9% | 13% | 49% | 51% | 1,794 | ±3 | Online (members) |
| 19–22 May 2016 | Newspoll | 41% | 36% | 11% | 12% | 49% | 51% | ? | ±3 | Landline |
| 19 May 2016 | ReachTEL | 42.6% | 36.6% | 9.9% | 10.9% | 50% | 50% | 2,407 | ? | Telephone (random) |
| 17–19 May 2016 | Ipsos | 43% | 34% | 14% | 9% | 51% | 49% | 1,497 | ±2.5 | Telephone (random) |
| 14–15 May 2016 | Morgan | 36.5% | 33% | 15.5% | 15% | 47.5% | 52.5% | 2,318 | ±1 | In person and SMS |
| 12–15 May 2016 | Essential | 42% | 38% | 9% | 11% | 49% | 51% | 1,784 | ±3 | Online (members) |
| 6–8 May 2016 | Lonergan | 42% | 35% | 12% | 10% | 50% | 50% | 1,841 | ? | Landline and mobile |
| 5–8 May 2016 | Essential | 42% | 38% | 10% | 10% | 49% | 51% | 1,754 | ±3 | Online (members) |
| 9 May 2016 | 2016 Federal Election campaign begins |
| 5–8 May 2016 | Newspoll | 41% | 37% | 11% | 11% | 49% | 51% | ? | ±3 | Landline |
| 5–7 May 2016 | Ipsos | 44% | 33% | 14% | 9% | 51% | 49% | 1,410 | ±2.6 | Telephone (random) |
| 4–6 May 2016 | Galaxy | 42% | 36% | 11% | 11% | 50% | 50% | 1,739 | ±2.5 | ? |
| 5 May 2016 | ReachTEL | 43.2% | 35.1% | 9.5% | 12.2% | 50% | 50% | 2,450 | ? | Telephone (random) |
| 27 Apr – 1 May 2016 | Essential | 40% | 38% | 10% | 12% | 48% | 52% | 1,753 | ±3 | Online (members) |
| 23–24, 30 Apr – 1 May 2016 | Morgan | 40% | 32.5% | 13.5% | 14% | 49% | 51% | 2,951 | ±1 | In person and SMS |
| 20–24 Apr 2016 | Essential | 40% | 39% | 10% | 11% | 48% | 52% | 1,740 | ±3 | Online (members) |
| 14–17 Apr 2016 | Newspoll | 41% | 36% | 11% | 12% | 49% | 51% | ? | ±3 | Landline |
| 13–17 Apr 2016 | Essential | 42% | 36% | 11% | 11% | 50% | 50% | 1,753 | ±3 | Online (members) |
| 9–10, 16–17 Apr 2016 | Morgan | 40.5% | 32% | 14% | 13.5% | 50% | 50% | 3,083 | ±1 | In person and SMS |
| 14–16 Apr 2016 | Ipsos | 42% | 33% | 14% | 11% | 50% | 50% | 1,402 | ±2.6 | Telephone (random) |
| 14 Apr 2016 | ReachTEL | 43.5% | 35.8% | 9.8% | 10.9% | 50% | 50% | 2,415 | ? | Telephone (random) |
| 6–10 Apr 2016 | Essential | 42% | 35% | 11% | 12% | 50% | 50% | 1,792 | ±3 | Online (members) |
| 31 Mar – 3 Apr 2016 | Newspoll | 41% | 36% | 11% | 12% | 49% | 51% | ? | ±3 | Landline |
| 26–27 Mar, 2–3 Apr 2016 | Morgan | 42% | 31% | 13% | 14% | 52.5% | 47.5% | 3,174 | ±1 | In person and SMS |
| 21 Mar 2016 | ReachTEL | 46.6% | 34.4% | 10.5% | 8.6% | 52% | 48% | 3,274 | ? | Telephone (random) |
| 17–20 Mar 2016 | Newspoll | 43% | 34% | 12% | 11% | 51% | 49% | ? | ±3% | Landline |
| 16–20 Mar 2016 | Essential | 43% | 38% | 10% | 9% | 50% | 50% | 1,790 | ±3 | Online (members) |
| 12–13, 19–20 Mar 2016 | Morgan | 40% | 33% | 14% | 13% | 49.5% | 50.5% | 2,948 | ±1 | In person and SMS |
| 10–12 Mar 2016 | Ipsos | 45% | 31% | 14% | 10% | 53% | 47% |
| 3–6 Mar 2016 | Newspoll | 43% | 35% | 12% | 10% | 50% | 50% |
| 2–6 Mar 2016 | Essential | 43% | 37% | 10% | 10% | 50% | 50% |
| 27–28 Feb, 5–6 Mar 2016 | Morgan | 43% | 29.5% | 13% | 14.5% | 53% | 47% |
| 24–28 Feb 2016 | Essential | 43% | 38% | 10% | 9% | 50% | 50% |
| 18–21 Feb 2016 | Newspoll | 43% | 35% | 12% | 10% | 50% | 50% |
| 17–21 Feb 2016 | Essential | 44% | 35% | 10% | 11% | 52% | 48% |
| 13–14, 20–21 Feb 2016 | Morgan | 43.5% | 29.5% | 15% | 12% | 52.5% | 47.5% |
| 11–13 Feb 2016 | Ipsos | 44% | 32% | 15% | 10% | 52% | 48% |
| 11 Feb 2016 | ReachTEL | 48.1% | 32.8% | 10.1% | 9% | 54% | 46% |
| 3–7 Feb 2016 | Essential | 44% | 35% | 10% | 10% | 52% | 48% |
| 30–31 Jan, 6–7 Feb 2016 | Morgan | 43.5% | 29% | 16% | 11.5% | 52.5% | 47.5% |
| 28–31 Jan 2016 | Newspoll | 46% | 34% | 11% | 9% | 53% | 47% |
| 16–17, 23–24 Jan 2016 | Morgan | 43.5% | 28% | 15% | 13.5% | 55% | 45% |
| 21 Jan 2016 | ReachTEL | 48.5% | 31.8% | 10.8% | 9.1% | 55% | 45% |
| 15–18 Jan 2016 | Essential | 44% | 35% | 10% | 12% | 51% | 49% |
| 2–3, 9–10 Jan 2016 | Morgan | 47% | 29% | 13% | 11% | 56% | 44% |
| 15 Dec 2015 | Essential | 45% | 35% | 10% | 10% | 52% | 48% |
| 5–6, 12–13 Dec 2015 | Morgan | 48% | 27% | 14.5% | 10.5% | 57.5% | 42.5% |
| 8 Dec 2015 | Essential | 44% | 36% | 11% | 10% | 51% | 49% |
| 4–6 Dec 2015 | Newspoll | 45% | 33% | 12% | 10% | 53% | 47% |
| 1 Dec 2015 | Essential | 44% | 35% | 11% | 10% | 51% | 49% |
| 21–22, 28–29 Nov 2015 | Morgan | 46.5% | 28.5% | 14% | 11% | 56% | 44% |
| 26 Nov 2015 | ReachTEL | 48.8% | 31.1% | 11.2% | 8.9% | 55% | 45% |
| 24 Nov 2015 | Essential | 45% | 35% | 10% | 10% | 52% | 48% |
| 19–22 Nov 2015 | Newspoll | 46% | 33% | 11% | 10% | 53% | 47% |
| 7–8, 14–15 Nov 2015 | Morgan | 46% | 28% | 14.5% | 11.5% | 56% | 44% |
| 12–14 Nov 2015 | Ipsos (Note: Ipsos asked respondents to nominate their own second preferences. Based only on 2013 preference flows, TPP is LNP 56% to ALP 44%.) | 48% | 29% | 13% | 10% | 57% | 43% |
| 10 Nov 2015 | Essential | 45% | 35% | 10% | 11% | 52% | 48% |
| 6–8 Nov 2015 | Newspoll | 46% | 34% | 10% | 10% | 53% | 47% |
| 3 Nov 2015 | Essential | 45% | 34% | 11% | 10% | 53% | 47% |
| 24–25 Oct, 1 Nov 2015 | Morgan | 47% | 28.5% | 14.5% | 10% | 56.5% | 43.5% |
| 27 Oct 2015 | Essential | 45% | 35% | 11% | 9% | 52% | 48% |
| 23–25 Oct 2015 | Newspoll | 45% | 35% | 11% | 9% | 52% | 48% |
| 22 Oct 2015 | ReachTEL | 46.7% | 33.0% | 11.3% | 9.1% | 53% | 47% |
| 20 Oct 2015 | Essential | 44% | 36% | 11% | 9% | 51% | 49% |
| 10–11, 17–18 Oct 2015 | Morgan | 46.5% | 27.5% | 15.5% | 10.5% | 56% | 44% |
| 15–17 Oct 2015 | Ipsos | 45% | 30% | 14% | 10% | 54% | 46% |
| 13 Oct 2015 | Essential | 44% | 36% | 10% | 10% | 51% | 49% |
| 9–11 Oct 2015 | Newspoll | 43% | 35% | 12% | 10% | 50% | 50% |
| 26–27 Sep, 1–5 Oct 2015 | Morgan | 47% | 27.5% | 14% | 11.5% | 56% | 44% |
| 1–4 Oct 2015 | Essential | 44% | 35% | 10% | 10% | 52% | 48% |
| 24–28 Sep 2015 | Essential | 44% | 35% | 11% | 11% | 52% | 48% |
| 17–21 Sep 2015 | Essential | 43% | 37% | 11% | 9% | 50% | 50% |
| 19–20 Sep 2015 | Morgan | 46% | 29.5% | 13% | 11.5% | 55% | 45% |
| 17–20 Sep 2015 | Newspoll | 44% | 35% | 11% | 10% | 51% | 49% |
| 15–16 Sep 2015 | Galaxy | 44% | 36% | 11% | 9% | 51% | 49% |
| 15 Sep 2015 | ReachTEL (Note: Malcolm Turnbull succeeded Tony Abbott as Liberal Party leader on 14 September 2015. Poll was conducted to gauge the public's response.) | 43.3% | 35.9% | 11.9% | 8.9% | 50% | 50% |
| 14 Sep 2015 | Turnbull replaces Abbott as Liberal leader |
| 12–13 Sep 2015 | Morgan | 35% | 36.5% | 16% | 12.5% | 43% | 57% |
| 5–6 Sep 2015 | Morgan | 36.5% | 35.5% | 16.5% | 11.5% | 45% | 55% |
| 4–6 Sep 2015 | Newspoll | 39% | 39% | 12% | 10% | 46% | 54% |
| 26–30 Aug 2015 | Essential | 40% | 38% | 11% | 12% | 48% | 52% |
| 27 Aug 2015 | ReachTEL | 40.3% | 37.5% | 13.4% | 8.9% | 47% | 53% |
| 22–23 Aug 2015 | Morgan | 38.5% | 36% | 14% | 11.5% | 45.5% | 54.5% |
| 20–23 Aug 2015 | Newspoll | 38% | 39% | 13% | 10% | 46% | 54% |
| 13–15 Aug 2015 | Ipsos | 38% | 36% | 16% | 11% | 44% | 56% |
| 11–14 Aug 2015 | Essential | 41% | 38% | 10% | 11% | 48% | 52% |
| 8–9 Aug 2015 | Morgan | 36.5% | 37% | 15.5% | 11% | 43% | 57% |
| 8–9 Aug 2015 | Newspoll | 39% | 39% | 13% | 9% | 46% | 54% |
| 4–7 Aug 2015 | Essential | 40% | 39% | 11% | 9% | 47% | 53% |
| 6 Aug 2015 | ReachTel | 40.2% | 38.3% | 12.8% | 8.7% | 47% | 53% |
| 28–31 Jul 2015 | Essential | 39% | 38% | 12% | 10% | 47% | 53% |
| 30 Jul 2015 | ReachTel | 40.6% | 38% | 12.9% | 8.6% | 47% | 53% |
| 25–26 Jul 2015 | Morgan | 39% | 35.5% | 15% | 10.5% | 46% | 54% |
| 16–19 Jul 2015 | Newspoll | 40% | 39% | 12% | 9% | 47% | 53% |
| 14–17 Jul 2015 | Essential | 41% | 38% | 11% | 11% | 48% | 52% |
| 11–12 Jul 2015 | Morgan | 41.5% | 34.5% | 13.5% | 10.5% | 49% | 51% |
| 4–5 Jul 2015 | Newspoll | 40% | 37% | 13% | 10% | 48% | 52% |
| 2–4 Jul 2015 | Ipsos | 39% | 35% | 16% | 10% | 47% | 53% |
| 27–28 Jun 2015 | Morgan | 39% | 36% | 14% | 11% | 46.5% | 53.5% |
| 16 Jun 2015 | Newspoll | 40% | 34% | 14% | 12% | 49% | 51% |
| 16 Jun 2015 | Essential | 42% | 39% | 10% | 9% | 48% | 52% |
| 13–14 Jun 2015 | Morgan | 37.5% | 37.5% | 13.5% | 11.5% | 45.5% | 54.5% |
| 11–13 Jun 2015 | Ipsos | 40% | 37% | 14% | 10% | 47% | 53% |
| 11–13 Jun 2015 | Essential | 41% | 40% | 9% | 10% | 48% | 52% |
| 2 Jun 2015 | Newspoll | 41% | 37% | 13% | 9% | 48% | 52% |
| 2 Jun 2015 | Essential | 41% | 37% | 13% | 9% | 48% | 52% |
| 23–24, 30–31 May 2015 | Morgan | 41% | 37% | 13% | 9% | 47% | 53% |
| 26 May 2015 | Essential | 41% | 39% | 10% | 9% | 48% | 52% |
| 18 May 2015 | Morgan | 41.5% | 35.5% | 12.5% | 10.5% | 49% | 51% |
| 17 May 2015 | Ipsos | 43% | 35% | 13% | 9% | 50% | 50% |
| 17 May 2015 | Newspoll | 40% | 37% | 12% | 11% | 47% | 53% |
| 13 May 2015 | ReachTel | 41.1% | 38.3% | 12.1% | 8.6% | 47% | 53% |
| 7–10 May 2015 | Essential | 41% | 39% | 11% | 10% | 48% | 52% |
| 6 May 2015 | Di Natale replaces Milne as Greens leader |
| 4 May 2015 | Newspoll | 39% | 35% | 12% | 14% | 48% | 52% |
| 4 May 2015 | Morgan | 40% | 37.5% | 11.5% | 11% | 46.5% | 53.5% |
| 28 Apr 2015 | Essential | 40% | 39% | 10% | 11% | 47% | 53% |
| 21 Apr 2015 | Essential | 41% | 39% | 11% | 10% | 48% | 52% |
| 11–12, 18–19 Apr 2015 | Morgan | 38.5% | 38% | 12% | 11% | 47% | 53% |
| 14 Apr 2015 | Essential | 41% | 39% | 10% | 11% | 48% | 52% |
| 10–12 Apr 2015 | Newspoll | 41% | 36% | 11% | 12% | 49% | 51% |
| 9–11 Apr 2015 | Ipsos | 39% | 38% | 13% | 9% | 46% | 54% |
| 28–29 Mar, 3–6 Apr 2015 | Morgan | 40.5% | 36% | 12.5% | 11% | 47% | 53% |
| 29 Mar 2015 | ReachTEL | 39.6% | 40.5% | 11.5% | 8.5% | 46% | 54% |
| 20–22 Mar 2015 | Newspoll | 41% | 37% | 11% | 11% | 49% | 51% |
| 14–15, 21–22 Mar 2015 | Morgan | 38% | 40% | 11% | 11% | 44% | 56% |
| 17 Mar 2015 | Essential | 40% | 39% | 9% | 11% | 48% | 52% |
| 10 Mar 2015 | Essential | 40% | 40% | 9% | 11% | 47% | 53% |
| 7–8 Mar 2015 | Newspoll | 38% | 39% | 12% | 11% | 45% | 55% |
| 28 Feb–1, 7–8 Mar 2015 | Morgan | 39% | 38% | 12.5% | 11.5% | 46.5% | 53.5% |
| 26–28 Feb 2015 | Ipsos | 42% | 36% | 12% | 10% | 49% | 51% |
| 20–22 Feb 2015 | Essential | 40% | 41% | 9% | 10% | 47% | 53% |
| 20–22 Feb 2015 | Newspoll | 38% | 38% | 12% | 12% | 47% | 53% |
| 6–8 Feb 2015 | Newspoll | 35% | 41% | 12% | 12% | 43% | 57% |
| 31 Jan–1, 7–8 Feb 2015 | Morgan | 35% | 41% | 12% | 12% | 42.5% | 57.5% |
| 5 Feb 2015 | ReachTEL | 38.4% | 41.4% | 11.2% | 8.9% | 45% | 55% |
| 4–5 Feb 2015 | Galaxy | 36% | 43% | 11% | 10% | 43% | 57% |
| 28–30 Jan 2015 | Galaxy | 36% | 43% | 11% | 10% | 43% | 57% |
| 27 Jan 2015 | ReachTEL | 39.7% | 40.2% | 11.3% | 8.8% | 46% | 54% |
| 27 Jan 2015 | Essential | 39% | 41% | 9% | 11% | 46% | 54% |
| 20 Jan 2015 | Essential | 40% | 40% | 10% | 11% | 47% | 53% |
| 13 Jan 2015 | Essential | 38% | 40% | 10% | 11% | 46% | 54% |
| 12 Jan 2015 | Morgan | 38.5% | 38.5% | 9.5% | 13.5% | 45.5% | 54.5% |
| 23–27 Dec 2014 | Morgan | 37.5% | 39.5% | 12% | 11% | 43.5% | 56.5% |
| 16 Dec 2014 | Essential | 40% | 38% | 10% | 12% | 48% | 52% |
| 12–15 Dec 2014 | Newspoll | 38% | 39% | 12% | 11% | 46% | 54% |
| 6–7, 13–14 Dec 2014 | Morgan | 35% | 41% | 11.5% | 12.5% | 42.5% | 57.5% |
| 4–6 Dec 2014 | Ipsos | 40% | 37% | 12% | 11% | 48% | 52% |
| 2–4 Dec 2014 | Galaxy | 38% | 41% | 11% | 10% | 45% | 55% |
| 2 Dec 2014 | Essential | 40% | 40% | 9% | 11% | 47% | 53% |
| 29–30 Nov 2014 | Newspoll | 37% | 37% | 13% | 13% | 46% | 54% |
| 22–23, 29–30 Nov 2014 | Morgan | 37% | 37.5% | 12% | 11.5% | 46.5% | 53.5% |
| 25 Nov 2014 | Essential | 40% | 39% | 10% | 11% | 48% | 52% |
| 21 Nov 2014 | ReachTEL | 40.2% | 38.7% | 11.1% | 9.9% | 47% | 53% |
| 18 Nov 2014 | Newspoll | 36% | 39% | 11% | 14% | 45% | 55% |
| 17 Nov 2014 | Essential | 40% | 38% | 10% | 12% | 48% | 52% |
| 17 Nov 2014 | Morgan | 38% | 38.5% | 12% | 11.5% | 44.5% | 55.5% |
| 11 Nov 2014 | Essential | 40% | 38% | 10% | 13% | 48% | 52% |
| 4 Nov 2014 | Newspoll | 38% | 36% | 13% | 13% | 46% | 54% |
| 4 Nov 2014 | Essential | 40% | 38% | 10% | 12% | 48% | 52% |
| 25–26 Oct, 1–2 Nov 2014 | Morgan | 38.5% | 37.5% | 12.5% | 11.5% | 45.5% | 54.5% |
| 30 Oct–1 Nov 2014 | Ipsos | 42% | 37% | 12% | 10% | 49% | 51% |
| 28 Oct 2014 | Essential | 39% | 39% | 9% | 12% | 47% | 53% |
| 23 Oct 2014 | ReachTEL | 40.1% | 37.5% | 11.5% | 10.9% | 48% | 52% |
| 21 Oct 2014 | Essential | 40% | 39% | 10% | 11% | 47% | 53% |
| 21 Oct 2014 | Newspoll | 38% | 34% | 14% | 14% | 47% | 53% |
| 20 Oct 2014 | Morgan | 39.5% | 35.5% | 12% | 13% | 48% | 52% |
| 14 Oct 2014 | Essential | 41% | 39% | 10% | 10% | 48% | 52% |
| 7 Oct 2014 | Essential | 40% | 39% | 10% | 11% | 48% | 52% |
| 4–5 Oct 2014 | Morgan | 40% | 35% | 12% | 13% | 47% | 53% |
| 4–5 Oct 2014 | Galaxy | 42% | 36% | 12% | 10% | 49% | 51% |
| 23 Sep 2014 | Newspoll | 41% | 34% | 11% | 14% | 49% | 51% |
| 13–14, 20–21 Sep 2014 | Morgan | 38.5% | 37.5% | 12% | 12% | 45.5% | 54.5% |
| 18 Sep 2014 | ReachTEL | 41.6% | 37.4% | 10.5% | 10.5% | 49% | 51% |
| 30–31 Aug, 6–7 Sep 2014 | Morgan | 38% | 37% | 10.5% | 14.5% | 46% | 54% |
| 5–7 Sep 2014 | Newspoll | 39% | 35% | 14% | 12% | 48% | 52% |
| 22–24 Aug 2014 | Newspoll | 40% | 34% | 11% | 15% | 49% | 51% |
| 16–17, 23–24 Aug 2014 | Morgan | 37.5% | 38.5% | 10.5% | 13.5% | 44.5% | 55.5% |
| 19 Aug 2014 | Essential | 40% | 38% | 9% | 13% | 48% | 52% |
| 9–10 Aug 2014 | Morgan | 37.5% | 38% | 11% | 13.5% | 44% | 56% |
| 8–10 Aug 2014 | Newspoll | 40% | 34% | 13% | 13% | 48% | 52% |
| 25–27 Jul 2014 | Newspoll | 36% | 36% | 12% | 16% | 46% | 54% |
| 11–13 Jul 2014 | Newspoll | 36% | 37% | 11% | 16% | 46% | 54% |
| 1 Jul 2014 | Essential | 40% | 38% | 9% | 13% | 48% | 52% |
| 30 Jun 2014 | Morgan | 35% | 36.5% | 12% | 16.5% | 42.5% | 57.5% |
| 27–29 Jun 2014 | Newspoll | 35% | 37% | 13% | 15% | 45% | 55% |
| 13–15 Jun 2014 | Newspoll | 37% | 36% | 10% | 17% | 47% | 53% |
| 30 May–1 Jun 2014 | Newspoll | 36% | 37% | 12% | 15% | 46% | 54% |
| 27 May 2014 | Essential | 40% | 39% | 9% | 12% | 48% | 52% |
| 20 May 2014 | Essential | 40% | 40% | 8% | 12% | 48% | 52% |
| 17–18 May 2014 | Morgan | 35% | 38.5% | 12% | 14.5% | 42.5% | 57.5% |
| 16–18 May 2014 | Newspoll | 36% | 38% | 11% | 15% | 45% | 55% |
| 15–17 May 2014 | Nielsen | 35% | 40% | 14% | 12% | 44% | 56% |
| 4 May 2014 | Galaxy | 39% | 37% | 11% | 13% | 48% | 52% |
| 2–4 May 2014 | Newspoll | 38% | 34% | 14% | 14% | 47% | 53% |
| 30 Apr 2014 | Essential | 40% | 38% | 10% | 11% | 48% | 52% |
| 22 Apr 2014 | Morgan | 38.5% | 34% | 13% | 14.5% | 48% | 52% |
| 15 Apr 2014 | Essential | 42% | 37% | 10% | 11% | 50% | 50% |
| 13 Apr 2014 | Nielsen | 40% | 34% | 17% | 9% | 48% | 52% |
| 8 Apr 2014 | Essential | 42% | 38% | 9% | 11% | 49% | 51% |
| 7 Apr 2014 | Morgan | 38.5% | 34.5% | 12% | 15% | 48.5% | 51.5% |
| 4–6 Apr 2014 | Newspoll | 43% | 34% | 11% | 12% | 51% | 49% |
| 25 Mar 2014 | Morgan | 38% | 38.5% | 11% | 12.5% | 45.5% | 54.5% |
| 25 Mar 2014 | Essential | 44% | 37% | 9% | 11% | 51% | 49% |
| 21–23 Mar 2014 | Newspoll | 40% | 36% | 13% | 11% | 48% | 52% |
| 18 Mar 2014 | Essential | 43% | 36% | 9% | 12% | 51% | 49% |
| 13–15 Mar 2014 | Nielsen | 44% | 35% | 12% | 10% | 51% | 49% |
| 7–9 Mar 2014 | Newspoll | 41% | 35% | 11% | 13% | 49% | 51% |
| 5 Mar 2014 | Essential | 44% | 38% | 8% | 10% | 51% | 49% |
| 23 Feb 2014 | Morgan | 41% | 35.5% | 10.5% | 13% | 49.5% | 50.5% |
| 21–23 Feb 2014 | Newspoll | 39% | 39% | 10% | 12% | 46% | 54% |
| 15 Feb 2014 | Nielsen | 44% | 33% | 12% | 11% | 52% | 48% |
| 7–9 Feb 2014 | Newspoll | 41% | 35% | 12% | 12% | 49% | 51% |
| 28 Jan 2014 | Morgan | 39.5% | 37% | 11.5% | 12% | 47% | 53% |
| 23 Jan 2014 | ReachTEL | 39.8% | 40.6% | 9.1% | 9.1% | 47% | 53% |
| 17–20 Jan 2014 | Essential | 43% | 37% | 9% | 11% | 51% | 49% |
| 13 Jan 2014 | Morgan | 38% | 39% | 10.5% | 12.5% | 47.5% | 52.5% |
| 16 Dec 2013 | Morgan | 40.5% | 38.5% | 10% | 11% | 47.5% | 52.5% |
| 15 Dec 2013 | ReachTEL | 41.4% | 40.4% | 8.7% | 9.5% | 48% | 52% |
| 6–8 Dec 2013 | Newspoll | 40% | 38% | 11% | 11% | 48% | 52% |
| 28 Nov–2 Dec 2013 | Essential | 44% | 36% | 8% | 11% | 52% | 48% |
| 30 Nov–1 Dec 2013 | Morgan (multi) | 41.5% | 38.5% | 8.5% | 12.5% | 48.5% | 51.5% |
| 22–24 Nov 2013 | Newspoll | 43% | 35% | 10% | 12% | 52% | 48% |
| 21–23 Nov 2013 | Nielsen | 41% | 37% | 11% | 11% | 48% | 52% |
| 8–10 Nov 2013 | Newspoll | 45% | 32% | 12% | 11% | 53% | 47% |
| 25–27 Oct 2013 | Newspoll | 47% | 31% | 10% | 12% | 56% | 44% |
| 19–20 Oct 2013 | Morgan | 43.5% | 34.5% | 10% | 12% | 51.5% | 48.5% |
| 13 Oct 2013 | Shorten replaces Rudd as Labor leader |
| 21–22 Sep 2013 | Morgan | 43.5% | 34% | 10.5% | 12% | 50.5% | 49.5% |
| 19–22 Sep 2013 | Essential | 43% | 37% | 9% | 11% | 51% | 49% |
| 12–15 Sep 2013 | Essential | 44% | 36% | 9% | 11% | 53% | 47% |
| 7 Sep 2013 | 2013 election | 45.6% | 33.4% | 8.7% | 12.3% | 53.5% | 46.5% |
| 4–6 Sep 2013 | Morgan (multi) | 45% | 31.5% | 9.5% | 14% | 54.5% | 44.5% |
| 5 Sep 2013 | ReachTEL | 43.5% | 33.7% | 10.2% | 12.6% | 53% | 47% |
| 3–5 Sep 2013 | Newspoll | 46% | 33% | 9% | 12% | 54% | 46% |

=== Preferred prime minister and satisfaction ===
| Date | Firm | Preferred prime minister | | Satisfied | Dissatisfied | Satisfied | Dissatisfied |
| | | Turnbull | Shorten | Turnbull | | Shorten |
|---|---|---|---|---|---|---|---|
| 28 Jun – 1 Jul 2016 | Newspoll | 48% | 31% | 40% | 47% | 36% | 51% |
| 30 Jun 2016 | ReachTEL | 52.9% | 47.1% |
| 26–29 Jun 2016 | Ipsos | 49% | 35% | 49% | 41% | 42% | 50% |
| 23–26 Jun 2016 | Essential | 40% | 29% | 40% | 40% | 37% | 39% |
| 23–26 Jun 2016 | Newspoll | 45% | 30% | 37% | 51% | 35% | 50% |
| 23 Jun 2016 | ReachTEL | 58.4% | 41.6% |
| 16–19 Jun 2016 | Newspoll | 46% | 31% | 36% | 51% | 35% | 51% |
| 16 Jun 2016 | ReachTEL | 57.6% | 42.4% |
| 14–16 Jun 2016 | Ipsos | 48% | 34% | 47% | 42% | 43% | 47% |
| 9–12 Jun 2016 | Essential | 40% | 29% | 38% | 40% | 34% | 40% |
| 9 Jun 2016 | ReachTEL | 55.4% | 44.6% |
| 2–5 Jun 2016 | Newspoll | 45% | 30% | 37% | 51% | 33% | 52% |
| 2 Jun 2016 | ReachTEL | 55.6% | 44.4% |
| 31 May – 2 Jun 2016 | Ipsos | 49% | 31% | 45% | 42% | 41% | 47% |
| 26–29 May 2016 | Essential | 40% | 27% | 41% | 39% | 34% | 44% |
| 26 May 2016 | ReachTEL | 54.9% | 45.1% |
| 19–22 May 2016 | Newspoll | 46% | 31% | 38% | 50% | 37% | 49% |
| 19 May 2016 | ReachTEL | 55.6% | 44.4% |
| 17–19 May 2016 | Ipsos | 47% | 30% | 48% | 38% | 40% | 46% |
| 12–15 May 2016 | Essential | 43% | 28% | 40% | 42% | 34% | 43% |
| 5–8 May 2016 | Newspoll | 49% | 27% | 38% | 49% | 33% | 52% |
| 5–7 May 2016 | Ipsos | 51% | 29% | 48% | 40% | 38% | 49% |
| 5 May 2016 | ReachTEL | 57.7% | 42.3% |
| 4–5 May 2016 | Morgan | 57% | 24% | 43% | 41% | 34% | 49% |
| 14–17 Apr 2016 | Newspoll | 47% | 28% | 36% | 49% | 31% | 52% |
| 14–16 Apr 2016 | Ipsos | 54% | 27% | 51% | 38% | 33% | 55% |
| 14 Apr 2016 | ReachTEL | 58.4% | 41.6% |
| Apr 2016 | Essential | 44% | 22% | 39% | 39% | 30% | 44% |
| 31 Mar–3 Apr 2016 | Newspoll | 48% | 27% | 38% | 48% | 32% | 53% |
| Mar 2016 | Essential | 48% | 19% | 45% | 35% | 27% | 47% |
| 21 Mar 2016 | ReachTEL | 60.0% | 40.0% |
| 10–12 Mar 2016 | Ipsos | 61% | 24% | 55% | 32% | 33% | 52% |
| 3–6 Mar 2016 | Newspoll | 55% | 21% | 44% | 41% | 30% | 55% |
| Feb 2016 | Essential | 52% | 15% | 51% | 27% | 27% | 48% |
| 18–21 Feb 2016 | Newspoll | 55% | 21% | 48% | 38% | 28% | 57% |
| 11–13 Feb 2016 | Ipsos | 64% | 19% | 62% | 24% | 30% | 55% |
| 11 Feb 2016 | ReachTEL | 74.9% | 25.1% |
| Jan 2016 | Essential | 51% | 18% | 51% | 25% | 27% | 47% |
| 28–31 Jan 2016 | Newspoll | 59% | 20% | 53% | 31% | 25% | 60% |
| Dec 2015 | Essential | 54% | 15% | 56% | 23% | 27% | 47% |
| 4–6 Dec 2015 | Newspoll | 60% | 14% | 52% | 30% | 23% | 61% |
| Nov 2015 | Essential | 55% | 14% | 56% | 20% | 27% | 47% |
| 26 Nov 2015 | ReachTEL | 71.4% | 28.6% |
| 19–22 Nov 2015 | Newspoll | 64% | 15% | 60% | 22% | 26% | 57% |
| 12–14 Nov 2015 | Ipsos | 69% | 18% | 69% | 16% | 29% | 57% |
| 6–8 Nov 2015 | Newspoll | 55% | 14% | 56% | 20% | 27% | 47% |
| Oct 2015 | Essential | 48% | 19% | 47% | 17% | 30% | 42% |
| 23–25 Oct 2015 | Newspoll | 63% | 17% | 58% | 23% | 26% | 58% |
| 20–22 Oct 2015 | Morgan | 76% | 14% | 66% | 18% | 25% | 62% |
| 15–17 Oct 2015 | Ipsos | 67% | 21% | 68% | 17% | 32% | 56% |
| 9–11 Oct 2015 | Newspoll | 57% | 19% | 50% | 25% | 28% | 53% |
| Sep 2015 | Essential | 53% | 17% | N/A | N/A | 29% | 50% |
| 17–20 Sep 2015 | Newspoll | 55% | 21% | 42% | 24% | 29% | 54% |
| 15–16 Sep 2015 | Galaxy | 51% | 20% |
| 15 Sep 2015 | ReachTEL | 61.9% | 38.1% |
| 15 Sep 2015 | Morgan | 70% | 24% |
| | | Abbott | Shorten | Abbott | | Shorten |
| 4–6 Sep 2015 | Newspoll | 37% | 41% | 30% | 63% | 30% | 58% |
| 27 Aug 2015 | ReachTEL | 42.1% | 57.9% |
| 20–23 Aug 2015 | Newspoll | 35% | 40% | 30% | 63% | 34% | 52% |
| 13–15 Aug 2015 | Ipsos | 39% | 45% | 35% | 59% | 39% | 49% |
| 11 Aug 2015 | Essential | 36% | 32% | 38% | 53% | 29% | 52% |
| 9 Aug 2015 | Newspoll | 39% | 39% | 33% | 61% | 29% | 57% |
| 6 Aug 2015 | ReachTEL | 41.5% | 58.5% |
| 31 Jul 2015 | ReachTEL | 44.9% | 55.1% |
| 16–19 Jul 2015 | Newspoll | 39% | 36% | 33% | 60% | 27% | 59% |
| 7 Jul 2015 | Essential | 37% | 30% | 37% | 53% | 27% | 52% |
| 6 Jul 2015 | Newspoll | 39% | 39% | 33% | 60% | 28% | 56% |
| 11–13 Jun 2015 | Newspoll | 41% | 38% | 34% | 56% | 28% | 54% |
| 11–13 Jun 2015 | Ipsos | 41% | 42% |
| 2 Jun 2015 | Essential | 38% | 33% | 39% | 50% | 32% | 45% |
| 2 Jun 2015 | Newspoll | 41% | 37% | 38% | 53% | 32% | 50% |
| 17 May 2015 | Ipsos | 44% | 39% | 42% | 50% | 41% | 45% |
| 17 May 2015 | Newspoll | 41% | 40% | 39% | 52% | 35% | 46% |
| 12 Apr 2015 | Essential | 35% | 32% | 36% | 54% | 32% | 41% |
| 5 Apr 2015 | Newspoll | 38% | 38% | 37% | 56% | 34% | 50% |
| 27 Apr 2015 | Morgan | 44% | 39% | 37% | 53% | 34% | 48% |
| 14 Apr 2015 | Essential | 33% | 35% | 33% | 58% | 33% | 42% |
| 10–12 Apr 2015 | Newspoll | 40% | 41% | 33% | 59% | 33% | 51% |
| 9–11 Apr 2015 | Ipsos | 38% | 46% | 34% | 60% | 42% | 44% |
| 20–22 Mar 2015 | Newspoll | 36% | 41% | 29% | 61% | 36% | 47% |
| 7–8 Mar 2015 | Newspoll | 33% | 44% | 28% | 63% | 39% | 42% |
| 26–28 Feb 2015 | Ipsos | 39% | 44% | 32% | 62% | 43% | 43% |
| 20–22 Feb 2015 | Newspoll | 35% | 43% | 25% | 68% | 35% | 49% |
| 6–8 Feb 2015 | Newspoll | 30% | 48% | 24% | 68% | 42% | 40% |
| 1 Feb 2015 | Galaxy | 27% | 44% |
| 28–30 Jan 2015 | Galaxy | 27% | 44% |
| 14 Jan 2015 | Morgan | 41% | 43% | 37% | 52% | 37% | 40% |
| 13 Jan 2015 | Essential | 35% | 37% | 37% | 53% | 39% | 33% |
| 28–30 Nov 2014 | Newspoll | 37% | 44% | 33% | 58% | 37% | 43% |
| 4–6 Dec 2014 | Ipsos | 39% | 47% |
| 28–30 Nov 2014 | Newspoll | 36% | 43% | 33% | 57% | 39% | 43% |
| 18 Nov 2014 | Newspoll | 37% | 43% | 36% | 55% | 39% | 41% |
| 11 Nov 2014 | Essential | 36% | 34% | 39% | 50% | 37% | 38% |
| 4 Nov 2014 | Newspoll | 39% | 38% | 37% | 52% | 37% | 45% |
| 30 Oct–1 Nov 2014 | Ipsos | 41% | 41% | 42% | 49% | 43% | 40% |
| 21 Oct 2014 | Newspoll | 39% | 38% | 38% | 53% | 35% | 46% |
| 14 Oct 2014 | Essential | 38% | 32% | 40% | 48% | 35% | 36% |
| 23 Sep 2014 | Newspoll | 41% | 37% | 41% | 52% | 38% | 43% |
| 5–7 Sep 2014 | Newspoll | 37% | 37% | 35% | 54% | 36% | 43% |
| 22–24 Aug 2014 | Newspoll | 39% | 40% | 36% | 55% | 40% | 39% |
| 8–10 Aug 2014 | Newspoll | 41% | 37% | 36% | 54% | 36% | 44% |
| 25–27 Jul 2014 | Newspoll | 38% | 38% | 36% | 53% | 38% | 41% |
| 11–13 Jul 2014 | Newspoll | 36% | 41% | 31% | 60% | 34% | 43% |
| 27–29 Jun 2014 | Newspoll | 34% | 44% | 31% | 62% | 34% | 41% |
| 13–15 Jun 2014 | Newspoll | 37% | 40% | 30% | 61% | 34% | 45% |
| 30 May – 1 Jun 2014 | Newspoll | 35% | 45% | 33% | 59% | 38% | 43% |
| 16–18 May 2014 | Newspoll | 34% | 44% | 30% | 60% | 42% | 39% |
| 15–17 May 2014 | Nielsen | 40% | 51% | 34% | 62% | 47% | 39% |
| 2–4 May 2014 | Newspoll | 40% | 38% | 35% | 56% | 35% | 41% |
| 13 Apr 2014 | Nielsen | 45% | 44% | 43% | 50% | 43% | 41% |
| 8 Apr 2014 | Essential | 42% | 32% | 41% | 47% | 34% | 38% |
| 4–6 Apr 2014 | Newspoll | 41% | 33% | 40% | 47% | 31% | 42% |
| 21–23 Mar 2014 | Newspoll | 43% | 36% | 40% | 50% | 36% | 43% |
| 13–15 Mar 2014 | Nielsen | 48% | 43% | 45% | 49% | 42% | 42% |
| 7–9 Mar 2014 | Newspoll | 42% | 36% | 38% | 50% | 33% | 43% |
| 21–23 Feb 2014 | Newspoll | 38% | 37% | 36% | 52% | 35% | 39% |
| 15 Feb 2014 | Nielsen | 49% | 39% | 45% | 47% | 40% | 40% |
| 7–9 Feb 2014 | Newspoll | 41% | 33% | 40% | 45% | 35% | 35% |
| 6–8 Dec 2013 | Newspoll | 41% | 34% | 40% | 45% | 44% | 27% |
| 22–24 Nov 2013 | Newspoll | 44% | 33% | 42% | 42% | 39% | 27% |
| 21–23 Nov 2013 | Nielsen | 49% | 41% | 47% | 46% | 51% | 30% |
| 8–10 Nov 2013 | Newspoll | 46% | 30% | 45% | 38% | 37% | 24% |
| 25–27 Oct 2013 | Newspoll | 47% | 28% | 47% | 34% | 32% | 24% |
| 2013 election | | – | – | – | – | – | – |
| 3–5 Sep 2013 | Newspoll | 45% | | 44% | 50% |
^ Remainder were "uncommitted" to either leader.
