= Results of the 1996 Australian federal election in territories =

This is a list of electoral division results for the Australian 1996 federal election for the Australian Capital Territory and the Northern Territory.

== Australian Capital Territory ==
1996 Australian federal election (Australian Capital Territory)
← 1993	2 March 1996	1998 →

All 3 Australian Capital Territory seats in the Australian House of Representatives and both seats in the Australian Senate

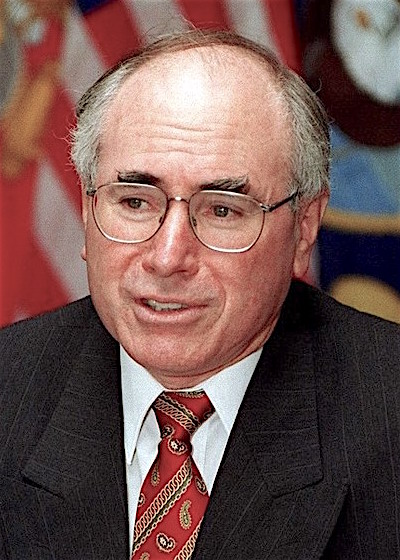
	First party	Second party
Leader	Paul Keating	John Howard
Party	Labor	Coalition
Last election	2 seats	0 seats
Seats won	3 seats	0 seats
Seat change	▲1	Steady
Popular vote	91,447	78,109
Percentage	47.91%	40.92%
Swing	▼5.43	▲6.73
TPP	55.5%	45.5%
TPP swing	▼5.7	▲5.7

Turnout 96.7% (CV) — Informal 2.8%
Party	Votes	%	Swing	Seats	Change
Labor	91,447	47.91	–5.43	3	▲1
Liberal	78,109	40.92	+6.73		Steady
Greens	16,596	8.70	+6.97		
Natural Law	778	0.41	–0.39		
Independents	3,933	2.06	–1.21		
Total	190,863			3	▲1
Two-party-preferred vote
Labor	105,323	55.5	–5.7	3	▲1
Liberal	84,592	45.5	+5.7	0	Steady
Invalid/blank votes	5,543	2.82	–0.53		
Turnout	196,406	96.67			
Registered voters	203,170				
Source: Federal Elections 1996

=== Canberra ===
1996 Australian federal election: Canberra
Party	Candidate	Votes	%	±%
Labor	Bob McMullan	32,405	48.28	−3.70
Liberal	Gwen Wilcox	25,594	38.13	+3.32
Greens	Gordon McAllister	6,047	9.01	+9.01
Independent	Sue Bull	1,508	2.25	+2.25
Independent	Jerzy Gray-Grzeszkiewicz	789	1.18	+1.18
Natural Law	Maryan Chaplin	778	1.16	+0.27
Total formal votes		67,121	97.33	+0.70
Informal votes		1,839	2.67	−0.70
Turnout		68,960	95.87	−1.09
Two-party-preferred result
Labor	Bob McMullan	38,338	57.52	−3.29
Liberal	Gwen Wilcox	28,317	42.48	+3.29
Labor gain from Liberal		Swing	−3.29	

Ros Kelly (Labor) had won Canberra at the 1993 election, however she resigned in 1995 and Brendan Smyth (Liberal) won the seat at the resulting by-election. Smyth contested the new seat of Namadgi

=== Fraser ===
1996 Australian federal election: Fraser
Party	Candidate	Votes	%	±%
Labor	John Langmore	30,459	50.51	−3.77
Liberal	Cheryl Hill	23,877	39.59	+7.15
Greens	Miko Kirschbaum	5,970	9.90	+9.90
Total formal votes		60,306	96.74	+0.55
Informal votes		2,032	3.26	−0.55
Turnout		62,338	96.84	+0.32
Two-party-preferred result
Labor	John Langmore	34,443	57.32	−4.74
Liberal	Cheryl Hill	25,647	42.68	+4.74
Labor hold		Swing	−4.74	

=== Namadgi ===
1996 Australian federal election: Namadgi
Party	Candidate	Votes	%	±%
Liberal	Brendan Smyth	28,638	45.14	+9.99
Labor	Annette Ellis	28,583	45.06	−8.89
Greens	Shane Rattenbury	4,579	7.22	+7.22
Independent	Derek Rosborough	1,636	2.58	+2.58
Total formal votes		63,436	97.43	+0.33
Informal votes		1,672	2.57	−0.33
Turnout		65,108	97.37	
Two-party-preferred result
Labor	Annette Ellis	32,542	51.51	−9.28
Liberal	Brendan Smyth	30,628	48.49	+9.28
Labor notional hold		Swing	−9.28	

Brendan Smyth (Liberal) was the sitting member for Canberra, having won the seat at the 1995 by-election.

== Northern Territory ==
1996 Australian federal election (Northern Territory)
← 1993	2 March 1996	1998 →

The one Northern Territory seat in the Australian House of Representatives and both seats in the Australian Senate
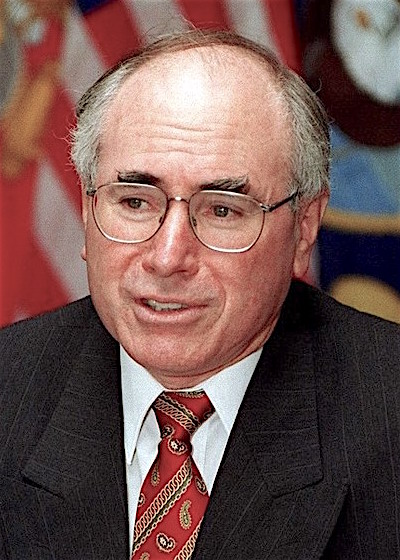

	First party	Second party
Leader	John Howard	Paul Keating
Party	Coalition	Labor
Last election	0 seats	1 seat
Seats won	1	0
Seat change	▲1	▼1
Popular vote	38,302	36,994
Percentage	45.04%	43.50%
Swing	▲0.35	▼11.81
TPP	50.37%	49.63%
TPP swing	▲5.68	▼5.68

=== Northern Territory ===
1996 Australian federal election: Northern Territory
Party	Candidate	Votes	%	±%
Country Liberal	Nick Dondas	38,302	45.04	+0.35
Labor	Warren Snowdon	36,994	43.50	−11.81
Greens	Philip Nitschke	5,324	6.26	+6.26
Independent	Bernie Brian	2,710	3.19	+3.19
Independent	Pamela Gardiner	1,713	2.01	+2.01
Total formal votes		85,043	96.61	−0.29
Informal votes		2,985	3.39	+0.29
Turnout		88,028	89.10	+0.30
Two-party-preferred result
Country Liberal	Nick Dondas	42,630	50.37	+5.68
Labor	Warren Snowdon	42,003	49.63	−5.68
Country Liberal gain from Labor		Swing	+5.68	

== See also ==
- Results of the 1996 Australian federal election (House of Representatives)
- Members of the Australian House of Representatives, 1996–1998
