= Electoral results for the Division of Canberra =

Australian division election results

This is a list of electoral results for the Division of Canberra in Australian federal elections from the division's creation in 1974 until the present.

== Members ==
Member	Party	Term
Kep Enderby	Labor	1974–1975
John Haslem	Liberal	1975–1980
Ros Kelly	Labor	1980–1995
Brendan Smyth	Liberal	1995–1996
Bob McMullan	Labor	1996–1998
Annette Ellis	Labor	1998–2010
Gai Brodtmann	Labor	2010–2019
Alicia Payne	Labor	2019–present

== Election results ==
=== Elections in the 2020s ===
==== 2025 ====
2025 Australian federal election: Canberra
Party	Candidate	Votes	%	±%
Greens	Isabel Mudford			
HEART	Mary-Jane Liddicoat			
Independent	Claire Miles			
Liberal	Will Roche			
Labor	Alicia Payne			
Animal Justice	Teresa McTaggart			
Total formal votes				
Informal votes				
Turnout				

==== 2022 ====
2022 Australian federal election: Canberra
Party	Candidate	Votes	%	±%
Labor	Alicia Payne	41,435	44.88	+4.38
Greens	Tim Hollo	22,795	24.69	+1.38
Liberal	Slade Minson	20,102	21.77	−6.08
Independent	Tim Bohm	4,772	5.17	+0.47
United Australia	Catherine Smith	1,687	1.83	+0.25
One Nation	James Miles	1,531	1.66	+1.66
Total formal votes		92,322	98.23	+0.39
Informal votes		1,668	1.77	−0.39
Turnout		93,990	92.08	−0.54
Notional two-party-preferred count
Labor	Alicia Payne	66,898	72.46	+5.38
Liberal	Slade Minson	25,424	27.54	−5.38
Two-candidate-preferred result
Labor	Alicia Payne	57,421	62.20	−4.89
Greens	Tim Hollo	34,901	37.80	+37.80
Labor hold				

Alluvial diagram for preference flows in the seat of Canberra in the 2022 federal election. indicates at what stage the winning candidate had over 50% of the votes and was declared the winner.

=== Elections in the 2010s ===
==== 2019 ====
2019 Australian federal election: Canberra
Party	Candidate	Votes	%	±%
Labor	Alicia Payne	34,989	40.50	−1.95
Liberal	Mina Zaki	24,063	27.85	−4.94
Greens	Tim Hollo	20,144	23.31	+4.59
Independent	Tim Bohm	4,062	4.70	+4.70
Progressives	Robert Knight	1,784	2.06	+2.06
United Australia	Greg De Maine	1,361	1.58	+1.58
Total formal votes		86,403	97.84	+0.13
Informal votes		1,904	2.16	−0.13
Turnout		88,307	92.62	+1.17
Two-party-preferred result
Labor	Alicia Payne	57,961	67.08	+4.14
Liberal	Mina Zaki	28,442	32.92	−4.14
Labor hold		Swing	+4.14	

==== 2016 ====
2016 Australian federal election: Canberra
Party	Candidate	Votes	%	±%
Labor	Gai Brodtmann	55,091	42.80	+1.65
Liberal	Jessica Adelan-Langford	48,416	37.61	+0.28
Greens	Patricia Cahill	19,200	14.92	+1.86
Bullet Train	Christopher Bucknell	6,013	4.67	+0.51
Total formal votes		128,720	97.29	+1.14
Informal votes		3,590	2.71	−1.14
Turnout		132,310	92.38	−4.08
Two-party-preferred result
Labor	Gai Brodtmann	75,247	58.46	+0.95
Liberal	Jessica Adelan-Langford	53,473	41.54	−0.95
Labor hold		Swing	+0.95	

==== 2013 ====
2013 Australian federal election: Canberra
Party	Candidate	Votes	%	±%
Labor	Gai Brodtmann	47,613	41.06	−3.17
Liberal	Tom Sefton	43,919	37.87	+0.66
Greens	Julie Melrose	14,691	12.67	−5.89
Bullet Train	Damien Maher	4,756	4.10	+4.10
Palmer United	Tony Hanley	3,725	3.21	+3.21
Secular	Nicolle Burt	1,264	1.09	+1.09
Total formal votes		115,968	96.06	+0.94
Informal votes		4,758	3.94	−0.94
Turnout		120,726	94.75	−0.11
Two-party-preferred result
Labor	Gai Brodtmann	66,074	56.98	−2.17
Liberal	Tom Sefton	49,894	43.02	+2.17
Labor hold		Swing	−2.17	

==== 2010 ====
2010 Australian federal election: Canberra
Party	Candidate	Votes	%	±%
Labor	Gai Brodtmann	49,608	44.23	−6.87
Liberal	Giulia Jones	41,732	37.21	+2.08
Greens	Sue Ellerman	20,816	18.56	+5.61
Total formal votes		112,156	95.12	−2.62
Informal votes		5,755	4.88	+2.62
Turnout		117,911	94.92	−1.09
Two-party-preferred result
Labor	Gai Brodtmann	66,335	59.15	−2.67
Liberal	Giulia Jones	45,821	40.85	+2.67
Labor hold		Swing	−2.67	

=== Elections in the 2000s ===
==== 2007 ====
2007 Australian federal election: Canberra
Party	Candidate	Votes	%	±%
Labor	Annette Ellis	58,711	51.10	+1.17
Liberal	Natalie Colbert	40,359	35.13	−1.56
Greens	Amanda Bresnan	14,878	12.95	+2.65
Citizens Electoral Council	John Holder	953	0.83	+0.13
Total formal votes		114,901	97.74	+1.11
Informal votes		2,660	2.26	−1.11
Turnout		117,561	96.05	+0.91
Two-party-preferred result
Labor	Annette Ellis	71,030	61.82	+1.91
Liberal	Natalie Colbert	43,871	38.18	−1.91
Labor hold		Swing	+1.91	

==== 2004 ====
2004 Australian federal election: Canberra
Party	Candidate	Votes	%	±%
Labor	Annette Ellis	50,214	49.88	+3.40
Liberal	Belinda Barnier	37,238	36.99	+2.95
Greens	Sue Ellerman	10,243	10.17	+3.92
Democrats	Aaron Matthews	2,218	2.20	−5.87
Citizens Electoral Council	Jim Arnold	765	0.76	+0.76
Total formal votes		100,678	96.60	+0.01
Informal votes		3,544	3.40	−0.01
Turnout		104,222	95.20	−0.13
Two-party-preferred result
Labor	Annette Ellis	60,029	59.62	+0.18
Liberal	Belinda Barnier	40,649	40.38	−0.18
Labor hold		Swing	+0.18	

==== 2001 ====
2001 Australian federal election: Canberra
Party	Candidate	Votes	%	±%
Labor	Annette Ellis	46,632	46.48	−2.42
Liberal	Belinda Barnier	34,148	34.04	+1.10
Democrats	Aaron Matthews	8,098	8.07	+0.70
Greens	Stephanie Koorey	6,268	6.25	+2.40
One Nation	Barry Cox	3,179	3.17	−2.05
Christian Democrats	John Miller	2,003	2.00	+2.00
Total formal votes		100,328	96.59	−0.58
Informal votes		3,542	3.41	+0.58
Turnout		103,870	95.88	
Two-party-preferred result
Labor	Annette Ellis	59,632	59.44	−0.62
Liberal	Belinda Barnier	40,696	40.56	+0.62
Labor hold		Swing	−0.62	

=== Elections in the 1990s ===
==== 1998 ====
1998 Australian federal election: Canberra
Party	Candidate	Votes	%	±%
Labor	Annette Ellis	48,015	48.90	+3.39
Liberal	Ian Morison	32,336	32.93	−10.89
Democrats	Yulia Onsman	7,237	7.37	+7.37
One Nation	Burl Doble	5,122	5.22	+5.22
Greens	Sue Ellerman	3,774	3.84	−3.67
Democratic Socialist	Nikki Ulasowski	1,427	1.45	+1.45
Natural Law	Maryan England	281	0.29	−0.10
Total formal votes		98,192	97.17	−0.38
Informal votes		2,860	2.38	+0.38
Turnout		101,052	95.91	+0.04
Two-party-preferred result
Labor	Annette Ellis	58,972	60.06	+7.74
Liberal	Ian Morison	39,220	39.94	−7.74
Labor hold		Swing	+7.74	

==== 1996 ====
1996 Australian federal election: Canberra
Party	Candidate	Votes	%	±%
Labor	Bob McMullan	32,405	48.28	−3.70
Liberal	Gwen Wilcox	25,594	38.13	+3.32
Greens	Gordon McAllister	6,047	9.01	+9.01
Independent	Sue Bull	1,508	2.25	+2.25
Independent	Jerzy Gray-Grzeszkiewicz	789	1.18	+1.18
Natural Law	Maryan Chaplin	778	1.16	+0.27
Total formal votes		67,121	97.33	+0.70
Informal votes		1,839	2.67	−0.70
Turnout		68,960	95.87	−1.09
Two-party-preferred result
Labor	Bob McMullan	38,338	57.52	−3.29
Liberal	Gwen Wilcox	28,317	42.48	+3.29
Labor gain from Liberal		Swing	−3.29	

Ros Kelly (Labor) had won Canberra at the 1993 election, however she resigned in 1995 and Brendan Smyth (Liberal) won the seat at the resulting by-election. Smyth contested the new seat of Namadgi

==== 1995 by-election ====
1995 Canberra by-election
Party	Candidate	Votes	%	±%
Liberal	Brendan Smyth	39,021	46.29	+10.07
Labor	Sue Robinson	25,689	30.48	−21.78
Greens	James Warden	10,835	12.85	+12.85
Against Further Immigration	Robyn Spencer	3,515	4.17	+4.17
Independent	Joanne Clarke	2,274	2.70	+2.70
Independent	Jerzy Gray-Grzeszkiewicz	1,956	2.32	+2.32
Republican	Joseph Cotta	1,003	1.19	+1.19
Total formal votes		84,293	96.46	−0.68
Informal votes		3,095	3.54	+0.68
Turnout		87,388	88.57	−8.39
Two-party-preferred result
Liberal	Brendan Smyth	47,672	56.58	+16.12
Labor	Sue Robinson	36,577	43.42	−16.12
Liberal gain from Labor		Swing	+16.12	

==== 1993 ====
1993 Australian federal election: Canberra
Party	Candidate	Votes	%	±%
Labor	Ros Kelly	46,895	52.26	+8.53
Liberal	Bill Stefaniak	32,504	36.22	−2.34
Democrats	Peter Myers	4,796	5.34	−7.40
Green Democratic	Greg Adamson	3,109	3.46	+3.46
Abolish Self Govt	Mike Trevethan	1,663	1.85	+1.85
Natural Law	Sally Kelly	775	0.86	+0.86
Total formal votes		89,742	97.14	−0.28
Informal votes		2,640	2.86	+0.28
Turnout		92,382	96.96	
Two-party-preferred result
Labor	Ros Kelly	53,432	59.56	+3.82
Liberal	Bill Stefaniak	36,275	40.44	−3.82
Labor hold		Swing	+3.82	

==== 1990 ====
1990 Australian federal election: Canberra
Party	Candidate	Votes	%	±%
Labor	Ros Kelly	35,286	43.8	−01.1
Liberal	Bill Mackey	31,009	38.5	+6.8
Democrats	Julie McCarron-Benson	10,215	12.7	+6.2
Green Democratic	Gina Jeffrey	2,856	3.5	+3.5
Nuclear Disarmament	Barbara Meyer	1,183	1.5	−2.7
Total formal votes		80,549	97.4	
Informal votes		2,191	2.6	
Turnout		82,740	95.9	
Two-party-preferred result
Labor	Ros Kelly	44,872	55.8	−6.2
Liberal	Bill Mackey	35,529	44.2	+6.2
Labor hold		Swing	−6.2	

=== Elections in the 1980s ===
==== 1987 ====
1987 Australian federal election: Canberra
Party	Candidate	Votes	%	±%
Labor	Ros Kelly	39,175	53.9	+2.3
Liberal	John Louttit	23,039	31.7	−1.7
Democrats	Frances English	4,712	6.5	+0.2
Nuclear Disarmament	Chris Warren	3,060	4.2	+4.2
Family Movement	Bev Cains	2,015	2.8	+2.8
Independent	John Farrell	742	1.0	+1.0
Total formal votes		72,743	96.9	
Informal votes		2,340	3.1	
Turnout		75,083	95.5	
Two-party-preferred result
Labor	Ros Kelly	45,070	62.0	+0.4
Liberal	John Louttit	27,661	38.0	−0.4
Labor hold		Swing	+0.4	

==== 1984 ====
1984 Australian federal election: Canberra
Party	Candidate	Votes	%	±%
Labor	Ros Kelly	33,454	51.6	−10.4
Liberal	Gary Humphries	21,667	33.4	−1.2
Nuclear Disarmament	Robyn Hancock	4,945	7.6	+7.6
Democrats	Fiona Richardson	4,087	6.3	+6.3
Deadly Serious	Joanne Hansen	724	1.1	−2.3
Total formal votes		64,877	95.8	
Informal votes		2,829	4.2	
Turnout		67,706	94.2	
Two-party-preferred result
Labor	Ros Kelly	39,946	61.6	−2.1
Liberal	Gary Humphries	24,931	38.4	+2.1
Labor hold		Swing	−2.1	

==== 1983 ====
1983 Australian federal election: Canberra
Party	Candidate	Votes	%	±%
Labor	Ros Kelly	40,434	62.2	+9.8
Liberal	Gerard Brennan	22,365	34.4	−7.7
Deadly Serious	Joanne Hansen	2,191	3.4	+3.4
Total formal votes		64,990	98.0	
Informal votes		1,330	2.0	
Turnout		66,320	96.1	
Two-party-preferred result
Labor	Ros Kelly		63.9	+8.2
Liberal	Gerard Brennan		36.1	−8.2
Labor hold		Swing	+8.2	

==== 1980 ====
1980 Australian federal election: Canberra
Party	Candidate	Votes	%	±%
Labor	Ros Kelly	32,352	52.4	+11.6
Liberal	John Haslem	25,957	42.1	−1.1
Democrats	Leo Nesic	2,845	4.6	−10.4
Independent	Kevin Wise	574	0.9	+0.9
Total formal votes		61,728	98.1	
Informal votes		1,215	1.9	
Turnout		62,943	94.9	
Two-party-preferred result
Labor	Ros Kelly		55.7	+6.7
Liberal	John Haslem		44.3	−6.7
Labor gain from Liberal		Swing	+6.7	

=== Elections in the 1970s ===
==== 1977 ====
1977 Australian federal election: Canberra
Party	Candidate	Votes	%	±%
Liberal	John Haslem	24,578	43.2	−6.2
Labor	Henry Lawrence	23,214	40.8	−4.4
Democrats	John Bellhouse	8,544	15.0	+15.0
Independent	Oleg Kavunenko	534	0.9	+0.9
Total formal votes		56,870	97.8	
Informal votes		1,289	2.2	
Turnout		58,159	93.2	
Two-party-preferred result
Liberal	John Haslem	28,976	51.0	−2.3
Labor	Henry Lawrence	27,894	49.0	+2.3
Liberal hold		Swing	−2.3	

==== 1975 ====
1975 Australian federal election: Canberra
Party	Candidate	Votes	%	±%
Liberal	John Haslem	25,697	49.4	+13.2
Labor	Kep Enderby	23,517	45.2	−8.6
Liberal Movement	Tony Harris	1,572	3.0	+3.0
Independent	Kevin Wise	434	0.8	+0.8
Independent	John Moloney	406	0.8	+0.8
Workers	Oleg Kavunenko	377	0.7	+0.7
Total formal votes		52,003	98.4	
Informal votes		853	1.6	
Turnout		52,856	93.9	
Two-party-preferred result
Liberal	John Haslem		53.3	+10.4
Labor	Kep Enderby		46.7	−10.4
Liberal gain from Labor		Swing	+10.4	

==== 1974 ====
1974 Australian federal election: Canberra
Party	Candidate	Votes	%	±%
Labor	Kep Enderby	24,761	53.8	+1.7
Liberal	Peter Hughes	16,658	36.2	+13.4
Australia	Mary Thomas	2,520	5.5	−8.2
Country	Dorothy Mattress	1,871	4.1	+4.1
Republican	Doreen Story	211	0.5	+0.5
Total formal votes		46,021	98.9	
Informal votes		508	1.1	
Turnout		46,529	93.0	
Two-party-preferred result
Labor	Kep Enderby		57.1	−9.5
Liberal	Peter Hughes		42.9	+9.5
Labor notional hold		Swing	−9.5	
