= Post-election pendulum for the 1996 Australian federal election =

The Mackerras pendulum as a way of predicting the outcome of an election contested between two major parties in a Westminster style lower house legislature such as the Australian House of Representatives, which is composed of single-member electorates and which uses a preferential voting system such as a Condorcet method or instant-runoff voting.

The pendulum works by lining up all of the seats held in Parliament for the government, the opposition and the crossbenches according to the percentage point margin they are held by on a two party preferred basis. This is also known as the swing required for the seat to change hands. Given a uniform swing to the opposition or government parties, the number of seats that change hands can be predicted.

Government seats (94)
Marginal
Northern Territory	NT	Nick Dondas	CLP	0.37
Paterson	NSW	Bob Baldwin	LIB	0.43
Canning	WA	Ricky Johnston	LIB	0.69
Lilley	Qld	Elizabeth Grace	LIB	0.73
Bendigo	Vic	Bruce Reid	LIB	0.88
Bowman	Qld	Andrea West	LIB	0.89
Makin	SA	Trish Draper	LIB	1.08
La Trobe	Vic	Bob Charles	LIB	1.37
Griffith	Qld	Graeme McDougall	LIB	1.47
Lindsay	NSW	Jackie Kelly	LIB	1.58
Kingston	SA	Susan Jeanes	LIB	2.01
McMillan	Vic	Russell Broadbent	LIB	2.07
McEwen	Vic	Fran Bailey	LIB	2.18
Cowan	WA	Richard Evans	LIB	2.39
Lowe	NSW	Paul Zammit	LIB	2.47
Deakin	Vic	Phil Barresi	LIB	2.48
Chisholm	Vic	Michael Wooldridge	LIB	2.59
Dickson	Qld	Tony Smith	LIB	3.17
Dunkley	Vic	Bruce Billson	LIB	3.36
Adelaide	SA	Trish Worth	LIB	3.52
Robertson	NSW	Jim Lloyd	LIB	3.56
Capricornia	Qld	Paul Marek	NAT	3.62
Ballarat	Vic	Michael Ronaldson	LIB	3.67
Murray	Vic	Sharman Stone	LIB	3.70 v NAT
Swan	WA	Don Randall	LIB	3.71
Parramatta	NSW	Ross Cameron	LIB	3.87
Leichhardt	Qld	Warren Entsch	LIB	4.18
Page	NSW	Ian Causley	NAT	4.31
Bass	Tas	Warwick Smith	LIB	4.57
Eden-Monaro	NSW	Gary Nairn	LIB	4.76
Hughes	NSW	Danna Vale	LIB	4.89
Moreton	Qld	Gary Hardgrave	LIB	5.09
Stirling	WA	Eoin Cameron	LIB	5.17
Aston	Vic	Peter Nugent	LIB	5.59
Braddon	Tas	Chris Miles	LIB	5.70
Fairly safe
Gilmore	NSW	Joanna Gash	LIB	6.24
Macquarie	NSW	Kerry Bartlett	LIB	6.36
Parkes	NSW	Michael Cobb	NAT	6.50
Herbert	Qld	Peter Lindsay	LIB	6.59
Casey	Vic	Bob Halverson	LIB	6.65
Richmond	NSW	Larry Anthony	NAT	6.75
Corangamite	Vic	Stewart McArthur	LIB	7.69
Petrie	Qld	Teresa Gambaro	LIB	7.70
Wentworth	NSW	Andrew Thomson	LIB	7.83
Hindmarsh	SA	Chris Gallus	LIB	8.06
Grey	SA	Barry Wakelin	LIB	8.54
Forde	Qld	Kay Elson	LIB	9.70
Dawson	Qld	De-Anne Kelly	NAT	9.92
Sturt	SA	Christopher Pyne	LIB	9.99
Safe
Flinders	Vic	Peter Reith	LIB	10.07
Bennelong	NSW	John Howard	LIB	10.13
Hinkler	Qld	Paul Neville	NAT	10.36
Macarthur	NSW	John Fahey	LIB	10.69
Higgins	Vic	Peter Costello	LIB	10.73
Goldstein	Vic	David Kemp	LIB	10.94
Menzies	Vic	Kevin Andrews	LIB	10.99
Cowper	NSW	Garry Nehl	NAT	11.56
Longman	Qld	Mal Brough	LIB	11.59
Boothby	SA	Andrew Southcott	LIB	11.60
Hume	NSW	Alby Schultz	LIB	11.77
Tangney	WA	Daryl Williams	LIB	12.13
Pearce	WA	Judi Moylan	LIB	12.18
Cook	NSW	Stephen Mutch	LIB	12.28
Wannon	Vic	David Hawker	LIB	12.31
Forrest	WA	Geoff Prosser	LIB	13.64
Kooyong	Vic	Petro Georgiou	LIB	13.81
Kennedy	Qld	Bob Katter	NAT	14.49
Mayo	SA	Alexander Downer	LIB	15.16
Warringah	NSW	Tony Abbott	LIB	15.32
Lyne	NSW	Mark Vaile	NAT	15.44
North Sydney	NSW	Joe Hockey	LIB	15.56
Mackellar	NSW	Bronwyn Bishop	LIB	16.53
Ryan	Qld	John Moore	LIB	16.87
McPherson	Qld	John Bradford	LIB	17.00
Indi	Vic	Lou Lieberman	LIB	17.79
Fadden	Qld	David Jull	LIB	17.84
Fairfax	Qld	Alex Somlyay	LIB	18.09
Berowra	NSW	Philip Ruddock	LIB	18.40
Gwydir	NSW	John Anderson	NAT	18.51
Wide Bay	Qld	Warren Truss	NAT	18.53
Gippsland	Vic	Peter McGauran	NAT	18.64
New England	NSW	Ian Sinclair	NAT	19.18
Wakefield	SA	Neil Andrew	LIB	19.96
Very safe
Moncrieff	Qld	Kathy Sullivan	LIB	20.25
Fisher	Qld	Peter Slipper	LIB	20.34
Barker	SA	Ian McLachlan	LIB	20.89
Riverina	NSW	Noel Hicks	NAT	21.01
Farrer	NSW	Tim Fischer	NAT	21.23
Groom	Qld	Bill Taylor	LIB	21.28
Mallee	Vic	John Forrest	NAT	23.50
Mitchell	NSW	Alan Cadman	LIB	24.32
Maranoa	Qld	Bruce Scott	NAT	25.73
Bradfield	NSW	Brendan Nelson	LIB	25.77
O'Connor	WA	Wilson Tuckey	LIB	25.93

Opposition seats (49)
Marginal
Dobell	NSW	Michael Lee	ALP	0.08
Brand	WA	Kim Beazley	ALP	0.23
Brisbane	Qld	Arch Bevis	ALP	0.36
Bruce	Vic	Alan Griffin	ALP	0.76
Lyons	Tas	Dick Adams	ALP	1.31
Rankin	Qld	David Beddall	ALP	1.35
Banks	NSW	Daryl Melham	ALP	1.41
Namadgi	ACT	Annette Ellis	ALP	1.51
Isaacs	Vic	Greg Wilton	ALP	1.56
Jagajaga	Vic	Jenny Macklin	ALP	2.71
Greenway	NSW	Frank Mossfield	ALP	3.39
Fremantle	WA	Carmen Lawrence	ALP	4.25
Barton	NSW	Robert McClelland	ALP	4.34
Franklin	Tas	Harry Quick	ALP	4.68
Wills	Vic	Kelvin Thomson	ALP	5.77 v IND
Fairly safe
Melbourne Ports	Vic	Clyde Holding	ALP	6.05
Werriwa	NSW	Mark Latham	ALP	6.21
Perth	WA	Stephen Smith	ALP	6.46
Corio	Vic	Gavan O'Connor	ALP	6.80
Hunter	NSW	Joel Fitzgibbon	ALP	6.97
Chisholm	Vic	Neil O'Keefe	ALP	7.03
Port Adelaide	SA	Rod Sawford	ALP	7.05
Fraser	ACT	John Langmore	ALP	7.32
Canberra	ACT	Bob McMullan	ALP	7.52
Shortland	NSW	Peter Morris	ALP	8.15
Charlton	NSW	Kelly Hoare	ALP	9.32
Bonython	SA	Bob Brown	ALP	9.32
Safe
Kingsford Smith	NSW	Laurie Brereton	ALP	10.15
Hotham	Vic	Simon Crean	ALP	10.56
Newcastle	NSW	Allan Morris	ALP	11.19
Reid	NSW	Laurie Ferguson	ALP	11.38
Watson	NSW	Leo McLeay	ALP	11.68
Denison	Tas	Duncan Kerr	ALP	11.79
Holt	Vic	Gareth Evans	ALP	12.81
Cunningham	NSW	Stephen Martin	ALP	12.91
Blaxland	NSW	Paul Keating	ALP	12.98
Sydney	NSW	Peter Baldwin	ALP	13.80
Prospect	NSW	Janice Crosio	ALP	13.91
Chifley	NSW	Roger Price	ALP	14.54
Grayndler	NSW	Anthony Albanese	ALP	16.38
Calwell	Vic	Andrew Theophanous	ALP	17.19
Fowler	NSW	Ted Grace	ALP	18.27
Lalor	Vic	Barry Jones	ALP	18.51
Maribyrnong	Vic	Bob Sercombe	ALP	18.85
Throsby	NSW	Colin Hollis	ALP	19.62
Very safe
Melbourne	Vic	Lindsay Tanner	ALP	20.21
Scullin	Vic	Harry Jenkins	ALP	20.74
Gellibrand	Vic	Ralph Willis	ALP	21.23
Batman	Vic	Martin Ferguson	ALP	21.31
Crossbench seats (5)
Oxley	Qld	Pauline Hanson	IND (Note: Pauline Hanson had been disendorsed as the Liberal candidate and ran as an independent, but she remained a Liberal on the ballot paper)	4.66 v ALP
Curtin	WA	Allan Rocher	IND	7.28 v LIB
Calare	NSW	Peter Andren	IND	13.32 v NAT
Kalgoorlie	WA	Graeme Campbell	IND	10.35 v ALP
Moore	WA	Paul Filing	IND	15.48 v ALP
