= Sports rorts affair (1993–1994) =

1993–94 political scandal in Australia

The "sports rorts" affair was the name by which Australian media and political commentators came to refer to events during the second Keating ministry in late 1993 and early 1994, where the then Sports Minister, Ros Kelly, was unable to appropriately explain the distribution of federal sporting grants to marginal electorates held by the governing Australian Labor Party. On 28 February 1994, Kelly resigned from her position under consistent pressure from the Australian Democrats and the Liberal opposition about the matter. Ultimately, the controversy also led to her resignation from Parliament and, at the resulting by-election on 25 March 1995, the government lost the normally safe Labor seat of Canberra.

In December 1993, the Auditor-General complained about the manner in which the Department had administered A$30 million of grants under the Community Cultural, Recreational and Sporting Facilities Program, which had been initiated by Graham Richardson in 1988. The Auditor-General reported that he could not find any documentation explaining the rationale for grants made by Kelly's department, and therefore could not assess her decision-making procedures. The opposition, led by John Hewson and Peter Costello, claimed in Parliament that the money had been directed into marginal Labor-held electorates before the 1993 federal election as a pork barrelling exercise. Initially, she avoided answering questions on the matter, but she relented following threats by the Australian Democrats to vote for a Liberal proposition establishing a Senate inquiry if she did not give evidence to a House of Representatives committee. During the enquiry, she said that she had assessed 2,800 submissions for funding on the sole basis of verbal advice from her staff, and that decisions on short-listed applications had been made on a "great big whiteboard" in her office, having been erased without permanent record once the decisions were made. The 12-person committee, despite having a Labor majority, ultimately found in February 1994 that her actions were "not illegal" but her administration was "deficient".

On 21 February 1994, following changes to Australian House of Representatives Question Time which created a roster for ministers to appear in the House, the Liberals, led by Hewson and Costello, used the opportunity to demand her resignation. On 28 February, she did so, although Keating continued to support her, speaking out on 3 March 1994 accusing the Senate of holding the Government to ransom.

Eleven months later, Kelly resigned from parliament, triggering a 1995 by-election. A 16.1% swing against Labor in the normally comfortably safe Labor seat resulted in the election of Liberal challenger Brendan Smyth on 25 March 1995. Labor was heavily defeated in the 1996 election, but Bob McMullan regained Canberra for Labor while Smyth failed to win the new seat of Namadgi.

== See also ==
- Sports rorts affair (2020)
