= Results of the 1998 Australian federal election in territories =

This is a list of electoral division results for the Australian 1998 federal election for the Australian Capital Territory and the Northern Territory.

== Australian Capital Territory ==
1998 Australian federal election (Australian Capital Territory)
← 1996	3 October 1998	2001 →

Both Australian Capital Territory seats in the Australian House of Representatives and both seats in the Australian Senate
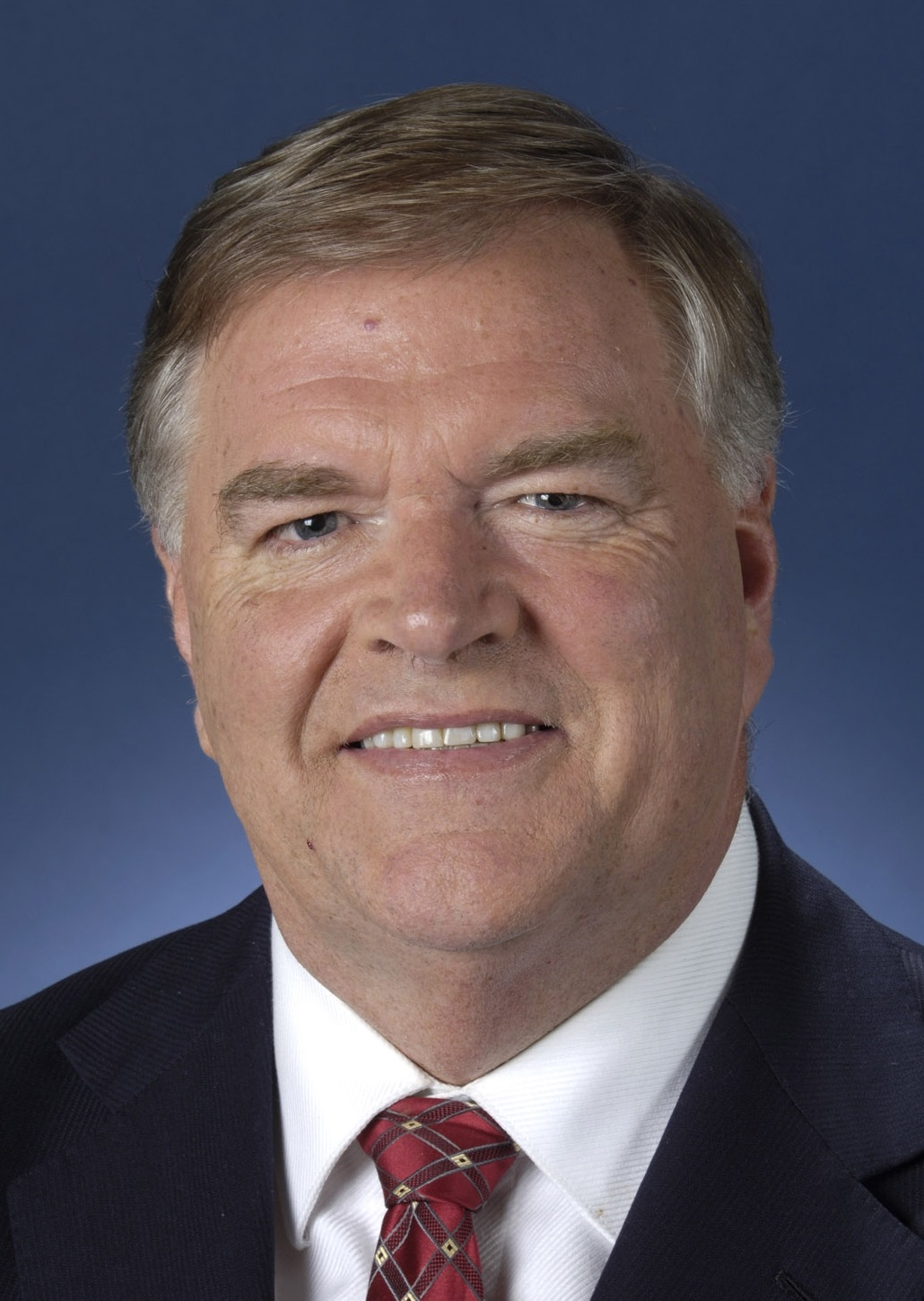

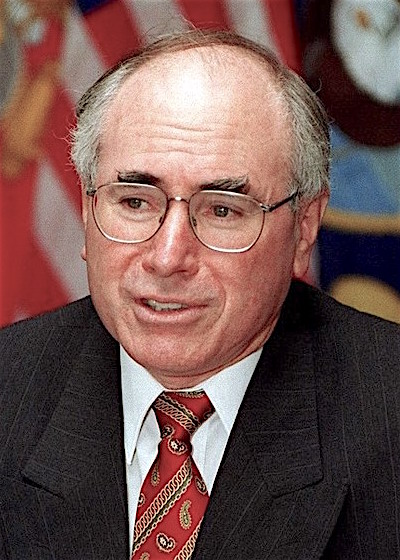
	First party	Second party
Leader	Kim Beazley	John Howard
Party	Labor	Coalition
Last election	3 seats	0 seats
Seats won	2 seats	0 seats
Seat change	▼1	Steady
Popular vote	98,588	59,424
Percentage	50.64%	30.52%
Swing	▲2.73	▼10.40
TPP	62.4%	37.6%
TPP swing	▲7.0	▼7.0

Turnout 95.7% (CV) — Informal 2.9%
Party	Votes	%	Swing	Seats	Change
Labor	98,588	50.64	+2.73	2	▼1
Liberal	59,424	30.52	–10.40		Steady
Democrats	14,394	7.39			
One Nation	9,895	5.08			
Greens	8,145	4.18	–4.52		
Democratic Socialist	2,641	1.36			
Natural Law	539	0.28	–0.13		
Independents	1,057	0.54	–1.52		
Total	194,683			2	▼1
Two-party-preferred vote
Labor	121,552	62.4	+7.0	2	▼1
Liberal	73,131	37.6	–7.0	0	Steady
Invalid/blank votes	5,743	2.87	+0.05		
Turnout	200,426	95.65			
Registered voters	209,536				
Source: Federal Elections 1998

=== Canberra ===
1998 Australian federal election: Canberra
Party	Candidate	Votes	%	±%
Labor	Annette Ellis	48,015	48.90	+3.39
Liberal	Ian Morison	32,336	32.93	−10.89
Democrats	Yulia Onsman	7,237	7.37	+7.37
One Nation	Burl Doble	5,122	5.22	+5.22
Greens	Sue Ellerman	3,774	3.84	−3.67
Democratic Socialist	Nikki Ulasowski	1,427	1.45	+1.45
Natural Law	Maryan England	281	0.29	−0.10
Total formal votes		98,192	97.17	−0.38
Informal votes		2,860	2.38	+0.38
Turnout		101,052	95.91	+0.04
Two-party-preferred result
Labor	Annette Ellis	58,972	60.06	+7.74
Liberal	Ian Morison	39,220	39.94	−7.74
Labor hold		Swing	+7.74	

=== Fraser ===
1998 Australian federal election: Fraser
Party	Candidate	Votes	%	±%
Labor	Bob McMullan	50,573	52.41	+1.89
Liberal	Peter Smith	27,088	28.07	−9.72
Democrats	Jason Wood	7,157	7.42	+7.42
One Nation	Chris Spence	4,773	4.95	+4.95
Greens	Gordon McAllister	4,371	4.53	−5.45
Democratic Socialist	Sue Bull	1,214	1.26	+1.26
Independent	Joanne Clark	1,057	1.10	+1.10
Natural Law	David Seaton	258	0.27	−0.16
Total formal votes		96,491	97.10	+0.32
Informal votes		2,883	2.90	−0.32
Turnout		99,374	95.39	−1.45
Two-party-preferred result
Labor	Bob McMullan	62,580	64.86	+6.00
Liberal	Peter Smith	33,911	35.14	−6.00
Labor hold		Swing	+6.00	

== Northern Territory ==
1998 Australian federal election (Northern Territory)
← 1996	3 October 1998	2001 →

The one Northern Territory seat in the Australian House of Representatives and both seats in the Australian Senate
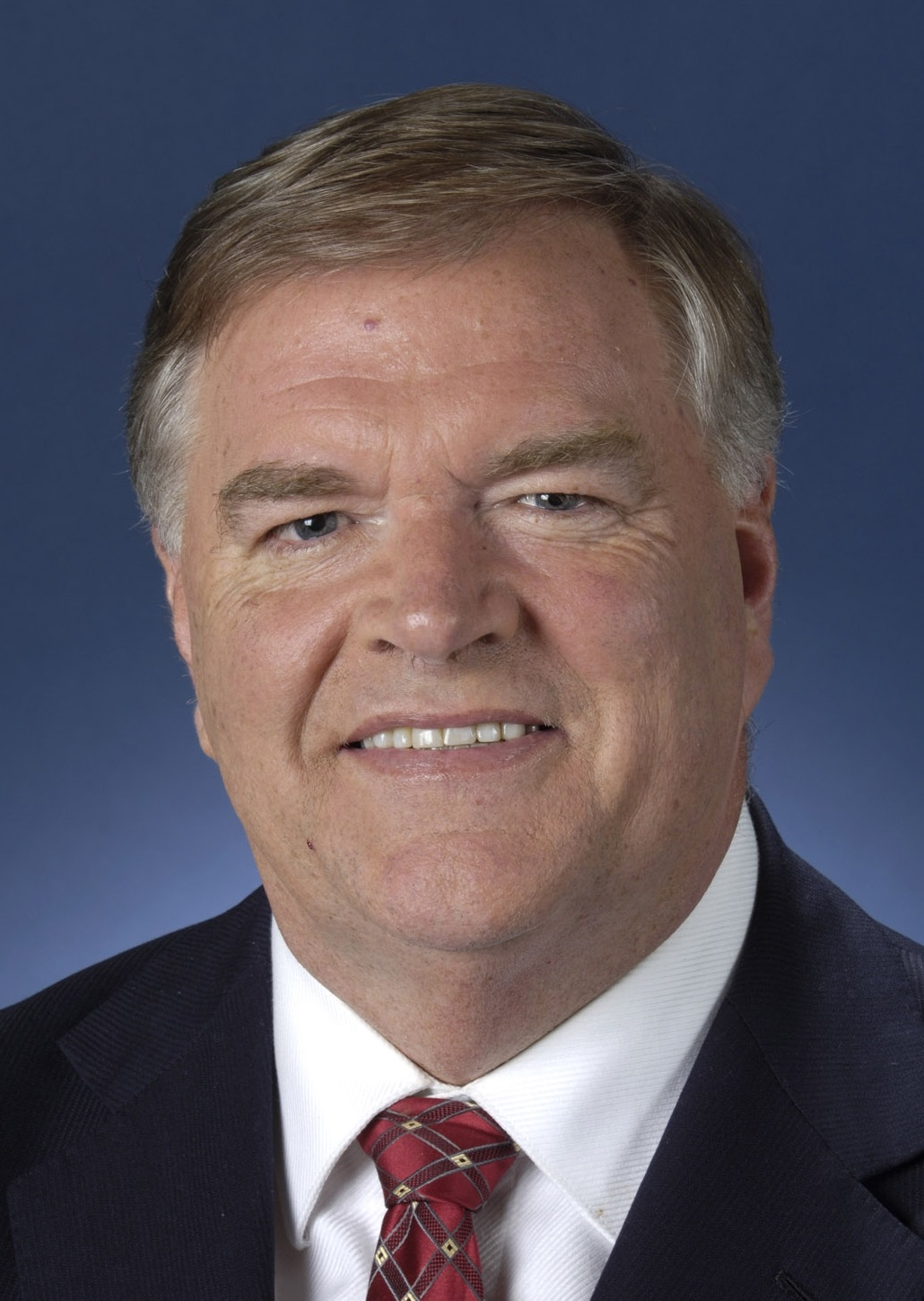

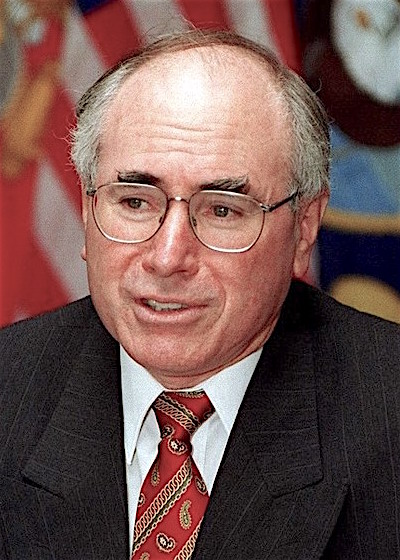
	First party	Second party
Leader	Kim Beazley	John Howard
Party	Labor	Coalition
Last election	0 seats	1 seat
Seats won	1	0
Seat change	▲1	▼1
Popular vote	38,469	36,014
Percentage	42.30%	39.60%
Swing	▼1.20	▼5.44
TPP	50.6%	49.4%
TPP swing	▲0.90	▼0.90

=== Northern Territory ===
1998 Australian federal election: Northern Territory
Party	Candidate	Votes	%	±%
Labor	Warren Snowdon	38,469	42.30	−1.20
Country Liberal	Nick Dondas	36,014	39.60	−5.44
One Nation	Peter Schirmer	7,401	8.14	+8.14
Democrats	Craig Seiler	4,658	5.12	+5.12
Greens	Ilana Eldridge	2,753	3.03	−3.23
Independent	Barry Nattrass	1,018	1.12	+1.12
Democratic Socialist	Natalie Zirngast	624	0.69	+0.69
Total formal votes		90,937	95.84	−0.77
Informal votes		3,951	4.16	+0.77
Turnout		94,888	90.33	+1.23
Two-party-preferred result
Labor	Warren Snowdon	45,986	50.57	+0.94
Country Liberal	Nick Dondas	44,951	49.43	−0.94
Labor gain from Country Liberal		Swing	+0.94	

== See also ==
- Results of the 1998 Australian federal election (House of Representatives)
- Members of the Australian House of Representatives, 1998–2001
