= Results of the 2001 Australian federal election in territories =

This is a list of electoral division results for the Australian 2001 federal election for the Australian Capital Territory and the Northern Territory.

== Australian Capital Territory ==
2001 Australian federal election (Australian Capital Territory)
← 1998	10 November 2001	2004 →

All 2 Australian Capital Territory seats in the Australian House of Representatives and all 2 seats in the Australian Senate
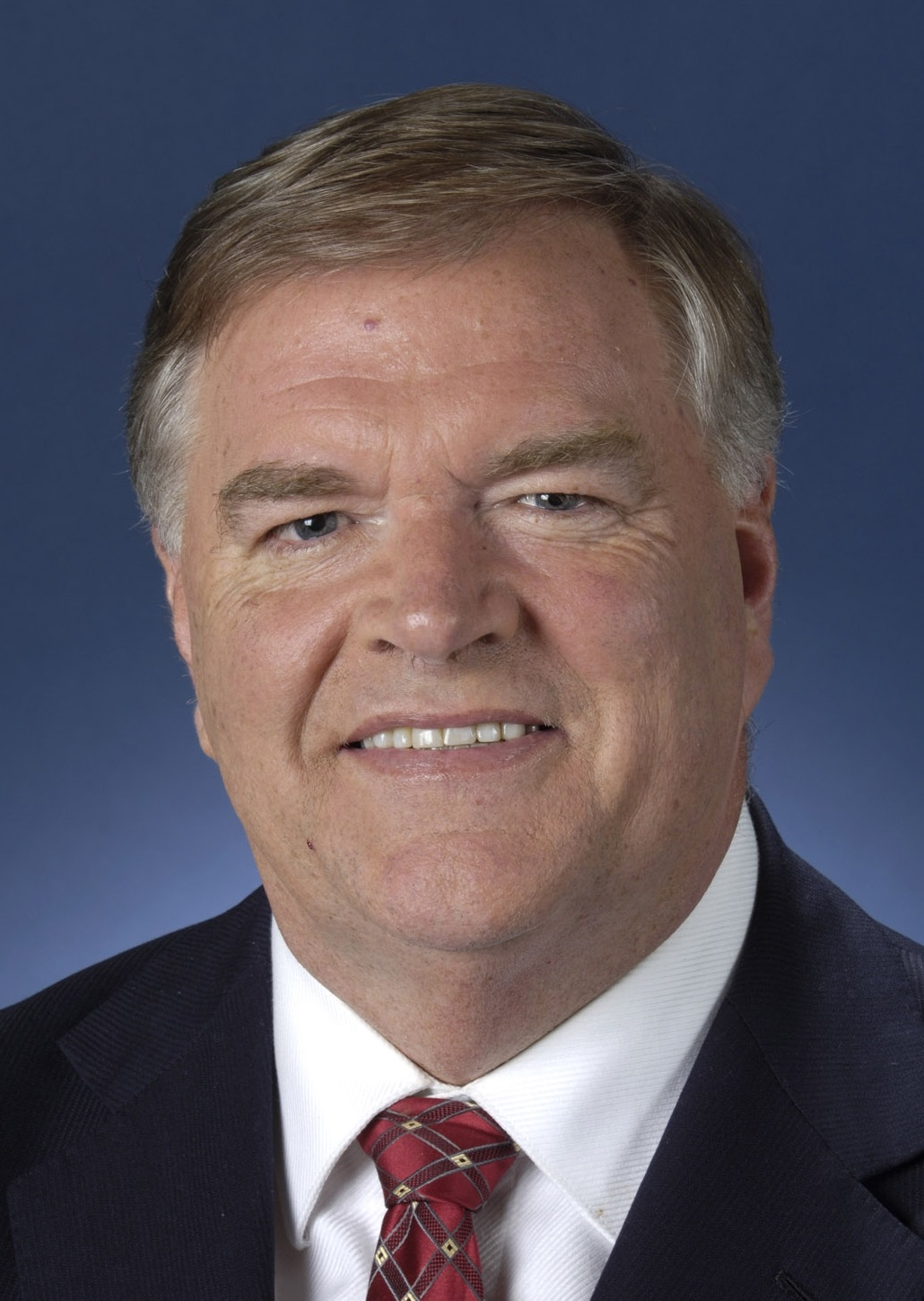

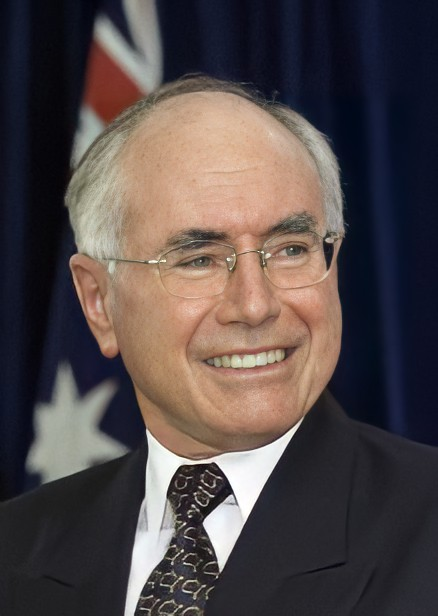
	First party	Second party
Leader	Kim Beazley	John Howard
Party	Labor	Liberal/National coalition
Last election	2 seats	0 seats
Seats won	2	0
Seat change	Steady	Steady
Popular vote	95,215	65,651
Percentage	46.98%	32.39%
Swing	▲3.66	▲1.87
TPP	61.08%	38.93%
TPP swing	▼1.36	▲1.36

Turnout 96.48% (CV) — Informal 3.52%
Party	Votes	%	Swing	Seats	Change
Labor	95,215	46.98	–3.66	2	Steady
Liberal	65,651	32.39	1.87	0	Steady
Democrats	16,266	8.03	0.63		
Greens	14,335	7.07	2.89		
One Nation	5,576	2.75	–2.33		
Christian Democrats	5,623	2.77	0.60		
Total	202,666			2	
Two-party-preferred vote
Labor		61.08	–1.36	2	Steady
Liberal		38.92	1.36	0	Steady

=== Canberra ===
2001 Australian federal election: Canberra
Party	Candidate	Votes	%	±%
Labor	Annette Ellis	46,632	46.48	−2.42
Liberal	Belinda Barnier	34,148	34.04	+1.10
Democrats	Aaron Matthews	8,098	8.07	+0.70
Greens	Stephanie Koorey	6,268	6.25	+2.40
One Nation	Barry Cox	3,179	3.17	−2.05
Christian Democrats	John Miller	2,003	2.00	+2.00
Total formal votes		100,328	96.59	−0.58
Informal votes		3,542	3.41	+0.58
Turnout		103,870	95.88	
Two-party-preferred result
Labor	Annette Ellis	59,632	59.44	−0.62
Liberal	Belinda Barnier	40,696	40.56	+0.62
Labor hold		Swing	−0.62	

=== Fraser ===
2001 Australian federal election: Fraser
Party	Candidate	Votes	%	±%
Labor	Bob McMullan	48,583	47.47	−4.94
Liberal	Martin Dunn	31,503	30.78	+2.71
Democrats	Fleur Wimborne	8,168	7.98	+0.56
Greens	Ben O'Callaghan	8,067	7.88	+3.35
One Nation	Paul Kemp	2,397	2.34	−2.60
Christian Democrats	Caroline O'Sullivan	2,251	2.20	+2.20
	James Vassilopoulos	1,369	1.34	+1.34
Total formal votes		102,338	96.58	−0.72
Informal votes		3,844	3.62	+0.72
Turnout		106,182	95.19	
Two-party-preferred result
Labor	Bob McMullan	64,154	62.69	−2.17
Liberal	Martin Dunn	38,184	37.31	+2.17
Labor hold		Swing	−2.17	

== Northern Territory ==
2001 Australian federal election (Northern Territory)
← 1998	10 November 2001	2004 →

All 2 Northern Territory seats in the Australian House of Representatives and all 2 seats in the Australian Senate
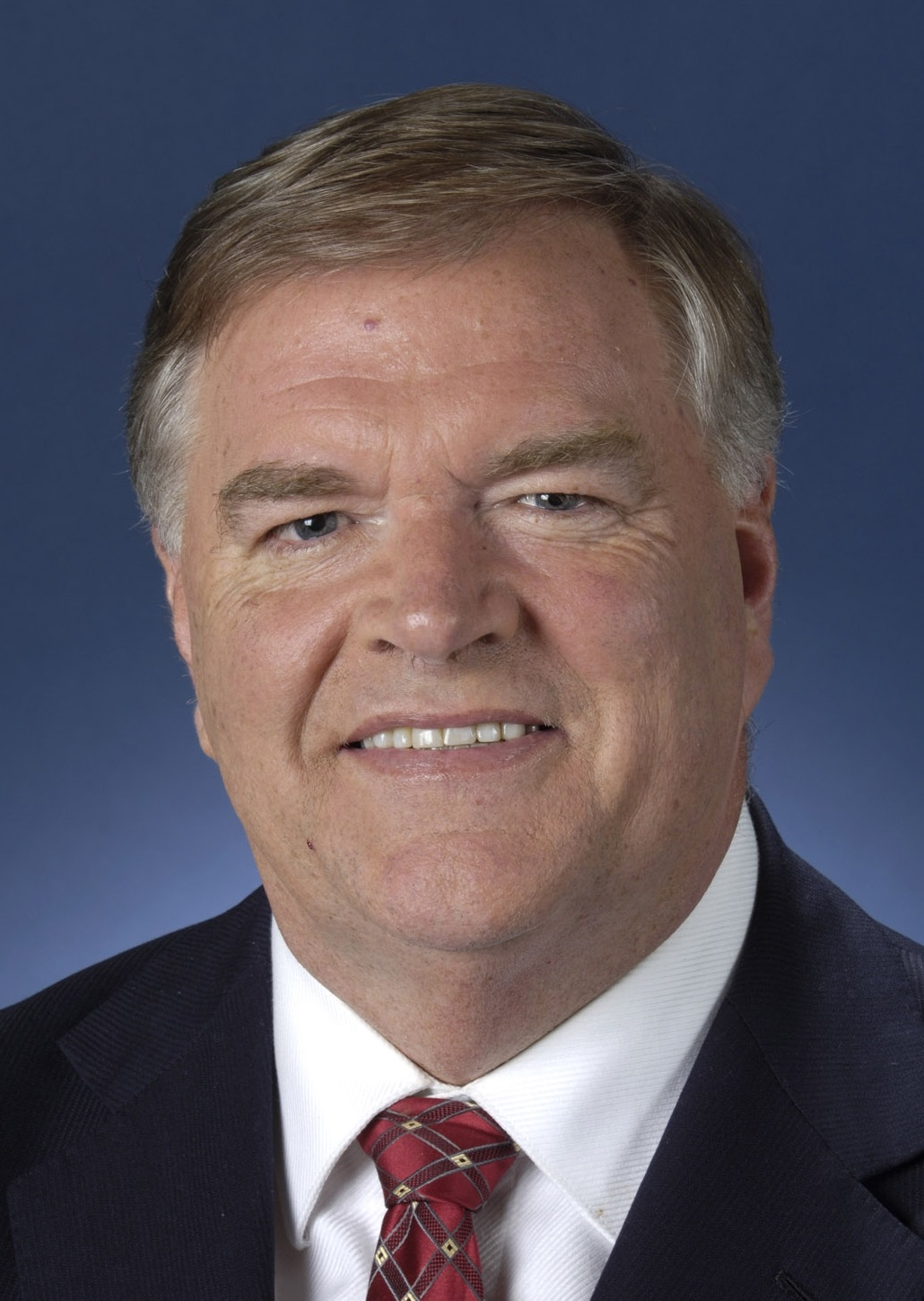

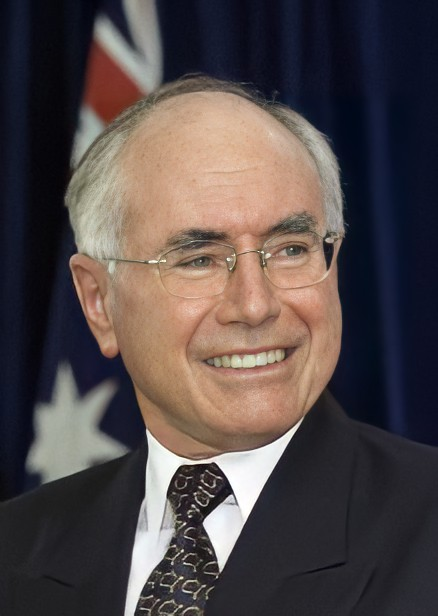
	First party	Second party
Leader	Kim Beazley	John Howard
Party	Labor	Liberal/National coalition
Last election	1 seat	0 seats
Seats won	1	1
Seat change	Steady	▲1
Popular vote	39,111	36,961
Percentage	42.90%	40.54%
Swing	▲0.60	▲0.94
TPP	50.57%	49.43%
TPP swing	▲1.92	▼1.92

Turnout 95.36% (CV) — Informal 4.54%
Party	Votes	%	Swing	Seats	Change
Labor	39,111	42.90	0.60	1	Steady
Country Liberal	36,961	40.54	0.94	1	▲1
Democrats	4,795	5.26	0.14		Steady
Greens	3,665	4.02	0.99		Steady
One Nation	3,486	3.82	-4.31		Steady
Independents	3,143	3.45	2.33		Steady
Total	91,161			2	▲1
Two-party-preferred vote
Labor		52.49	1.92	1	Steady
Country Liberal		47.51	–1.92	1	▲1

=== Lingiari ===
2001 Australian federal election: Lingiari
Party	Candidate	Votes	%	±%
Labor	Warren Snowdon	20,916	47.83	+1.60
Country Liberal	Ron Kelly	17,133	39.18	+2.81
Democrats	Linda Chellew	2,213	5.06	−0.06
One Nation	Wayne Norris	1,817	4.15	−3.83
Greens	Rob Hoad	1,226	2.80	+0.19
	Wayne Wright	428	0.98	+0.98
Total formal votes		43,733	95.13	−0.10
Informal votes		2,240	4.87	+0.10
Turnout		45,973	80.94	
Two-party-preferred result
Labor	Warren Snowdon	24,182	55.29	+1.76
Country Liberal	Ron Kelly	19,551	44.71	−1.76
Labor notional hold		Swing	+1.76	

=== Solomon ===
2001 Australian federal election: Solomon
Party	Candidate	Votes	%	±%
Country Liberal	Dave Tollner	19,828	41.81	−0.87
Labor	Laurene Hull	18,195	38.36	−0.22
Democrats	Ted Dunstan	2,582	5.44	+0.32
Greens	David Pollock	2,439	5.14	+1.72
Independent	Maisie Austin	2,378	5.01	+5.01
One Nation	Mervyn Stewart	1,669	3.52	−4.77
Independent	Maurie Ryan-Japarta	337	0.71	+0.71
Total formal votes		47,428	95.57	−0.85
Informal votes		2,196	4.43	+0.85
Turnout		49,624	92.40	
Two-party-preferred result
Country Liberal	Dave Tollner	23,758	50.09	−2.15
Labor	Laurene Hull	23,670	49.91	+2.15
Country Liberal notional hold		Swing	−2.15	

== See also ==
- Results of the 2001 Australian federal election (House of Representatives)
- Members of the Australian House of Representatives, 2001–2004
