= Results of the 2004 Australian federal election in territories =

This is a list of electoral division results for the Australian 2004 federal election for the Australian Capital Territory and the Northern Territory.

== Australian Capital Territory ==
2004 Australian federal election (Australian Capital Territory)
← 2001	9 October 2004	2007 →

All 2 Australian Capital Territory seats in the Australian House of Representatives and all 2 seats in the Australian Senate
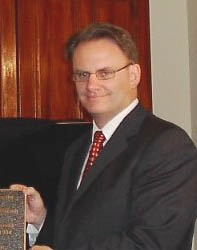

	First party	Second party
Leader	Mark Latham	John Howard
Party	Labor	Liberal/National coalition
Last election	2 seats	0 seats
Seats won	2 seats	0 seats
Seat change	Steady	Steady
Popular vote	104,836	73,508
Percentage	50.20%	35.20%
Swing	▲3.30	▲2.80
TPP	61.10%	38.90%
TPP swing	▼1.40	▲1.40

Turnout 95.85% (CV) — Informal 2.31%
Party	Votes	%	Swing	Seats	Change
Labor	104,836	50.2	+3.3	2	Steady
Liberal	73,508	35.2	+2.8	0	Steady
Greens	22,440	10.8	+3.7		
Democrats	5,010	2.4	–5.6		
Socialist Alliance	2,067	1.0	+1.0		
Citizens Electoral Council	765	0.4	+0.4		
Total	208,626			2	
Two-party-preferred vote
Labor		61.1	–1.4	2	Steady
Liberal		38.9	+1.4	0	Steady

=== Canberra ===
2004 Australian federal election: Canberra
Party	Candidate	Votes	%	±%
Labor	Annette Ellis	50,214	49.88	+3.40
Liberal	Belinda Barnier	37,238	36.99	+2.95
Greens	Sue Ellerman	10,243	10.17	+3.92
Democrats	Aaron Matthews	2,218	2.20	−5.87
Citizens Electoral Council	Jim Arnold	765	0.76	+0.76
Total formal votes		100,678	96.60	+0.01
Informal votes		3,544	3.40	−0.01
Turnout		104,222	95.20	−0.13
Two-party-preferred result
Labor	Annette Ellis	60,029	59.62	+0.18
Liberal	Belinda Barnier	40,649	40.38	−0.18
Labor hold		Swing	+0.18	

=== Fraser ===
2004 Australian federal election: Fraser
Party	Candidate	Votes	%	±%
Labor	Bob McMullan	54,622	50.60	+3.13
Liberal	Adam Giles	36,270	33.60	+2.82
Greens	David Turbayne	12,197	11.30	+3.42
Democrats	Lynne Grimsey	2,792	2.59	−5.39
Socialist Alliance	James Vassilopoulos	2,067	1.91	+1.91
Total formal votes		107,948	96.52	+0.14
Informal votes		3,887	3.48	−0.14
Turnout		111,835	94.72	+0.11
Two-party-preferred result
Labor	Bob McMullan	68,359	63.33	+0.64
Liberal	Adam Giles	39,589	36.67	−0.64
Labor hold		Swing	+0.64	

== Northern Territory ==
2004 Australian federal election (Northern Territory)
← 2001	9 October 2004	2007 →

All 2 Northern Territory seats in the Australian House of Representatives and all 2 seats in the Australian Senate
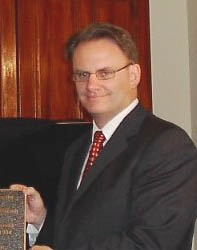

	First party	Second party
Leader	Mark Latham	John Howard
Party	Labor	Liberal/National coalition
Last election	1 seat	1 seat
Seats won	1 seat	1 seat
Seat change	Steady	Steady
Popular vote	40,246	39,855
Percentage	44.27%	43.84%
Swing	▲1.34	▲3.30
TPP	52.15%	47.85%
TPP swing	▼0.34	▲0.34

Turnout 86.53% (CV) — Informal 3.85%
Party	Votes	%	Swing	Seats	Change
Labor	40,246	44.27	+1.37	1	Steady
Country Liberal	39,855	43.84	+3.30	1	Steady
Greens	5,646	6.21	+2.19		
Democrats	2,152	2.37	–2.89		
Family First	1,000	1.10	+1.10		
Citizens Electoral Council	235	0.26	+0.26		
Independents	1,781	1.96	–1.49		
Total	89,972			2	
Two-party-preferred vote
Labor		52.15	–0.34	1	Steady
Country Liberal		47.85	+0.34	0	Steady

=== Lingiari ===
2004 Australian federal election: Lingiari
Party	Candidate	Votes	%	±%
Labor	Warren Snowdon	21,782	50.66	+2.83
Country Liberal	Maisie Austin	16,494	38.36	−0.82
Greens	James Bristow	2,400	5.58	+2.78
Democrats	David Curtis	1,260	2.93	−2.13
Independent	Andrew Mills	1,063	2.47	+2.47
Total formal votes		42,999	95.06	−0.07
Informal votes		2,235	4.94	+0.07
Turnout		45,234	77.71	−2.84
Two-party-preferred result
Labor	Warren Snowdon	24,795	57.66	+2.37
Country Liberal	Maisie Austin	18,204	42.32	−2.37
Labor hold		Swing	+2.37	

=== Solomon ===
2004 Australian federal election: Solomon
Party	Candidate	Votes	%	±%
Country Liberal	Dave Tollner	23,361	48.75	+6.94
Labor	Jim Davidson	18,464	38.53	+0.17
Greens	Ilana Eldridge	3,256	6.77	+1.63
Family First	Mark West	1,000	2.09	+2.09
Democrats	Duncan Dean	892	1.86	−3.58
	Maurice Foley	718	1.50	+1.50
Citizens Electoral Council	Peter Flynn	235	0.49	+0.49
Total formal votes		47,916	96.00	+0.43
Informal votes		1,996	4.00	−0.43
Turnout		49,912	91.21	−0.78
Two-party-preferred result
Country Liberal	Dave Tollner	25,303	52.81	+2.72
Labor	Jim Davidson	22,613	47.19	−2.72
Country Liberal hold		Swing	+2.72	

== See also ==
- Members of the Australian House of Representatives, 2004–2007
