= Results of the 2007 Australian federal election in territories =

This is a list of electoral division results for the Australian 2007 federal election for the Australian Capital Territory and the Northern Territory.

== Australian Capital Territory ==
2007 Australian federal election (Australian Capital Territory)
← 2004	24 November 2007	2010 →

All 2 Australian Capital Territory seats in the Australian House of Representatives and all 2 seats in the Australian Senate
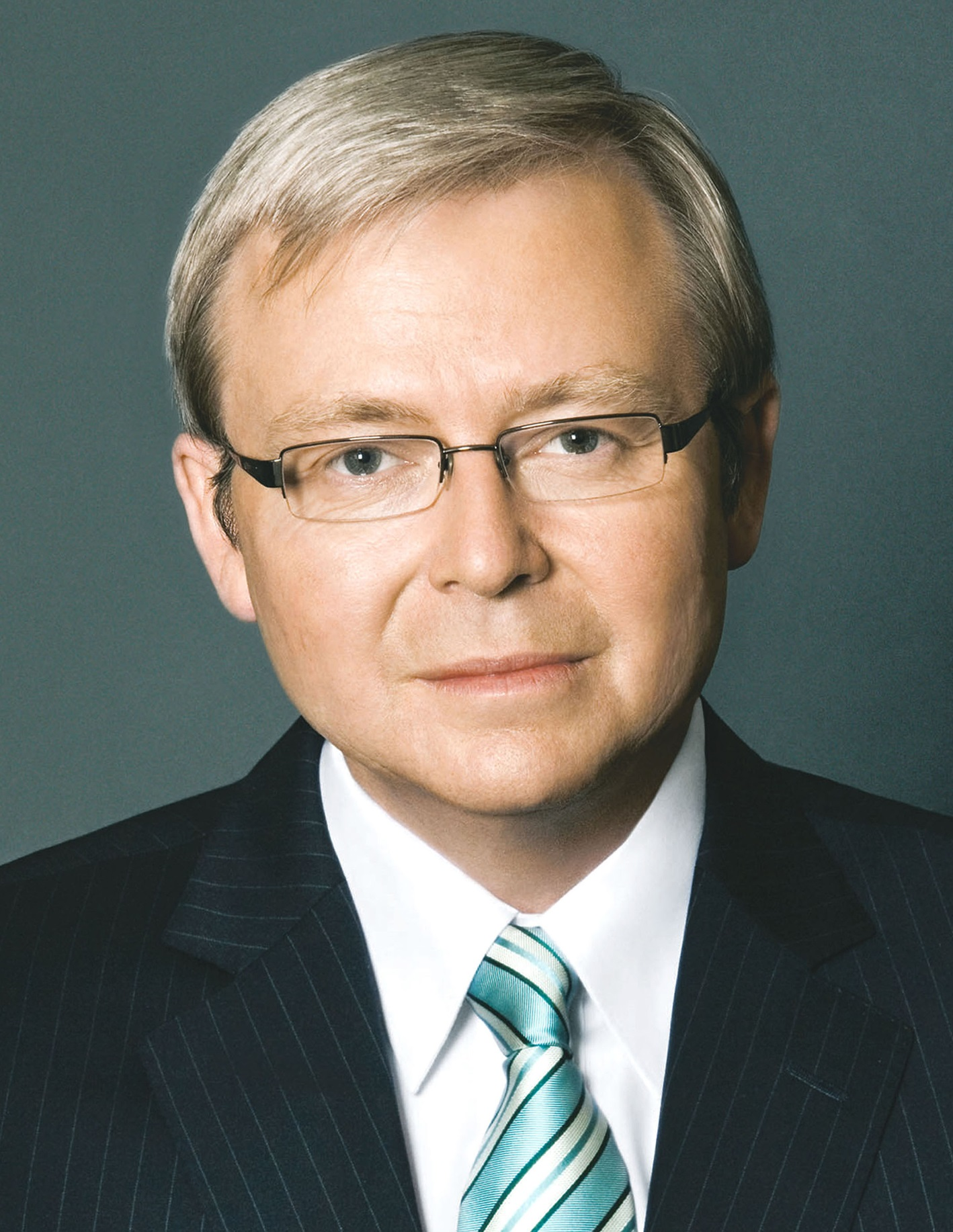

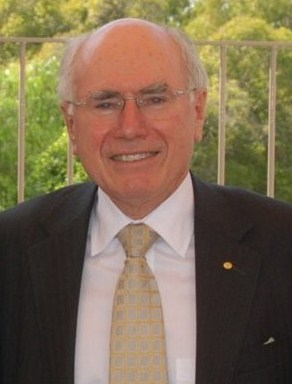
	First party	Second party
Leader	Kevin Rudd	John Howard
Party	Labor	Liberal/National coalition
Last election	2 seats	0 seats
Seats won	2	0
Seat change	Steady	Steady
Popular vote	114,244	74,295
Percentage	51.10%	33.23%
Swing	▲2.05	▼2.00
TPP	63.40%	36.60%
TPP swing	▲1.86	▼1.86

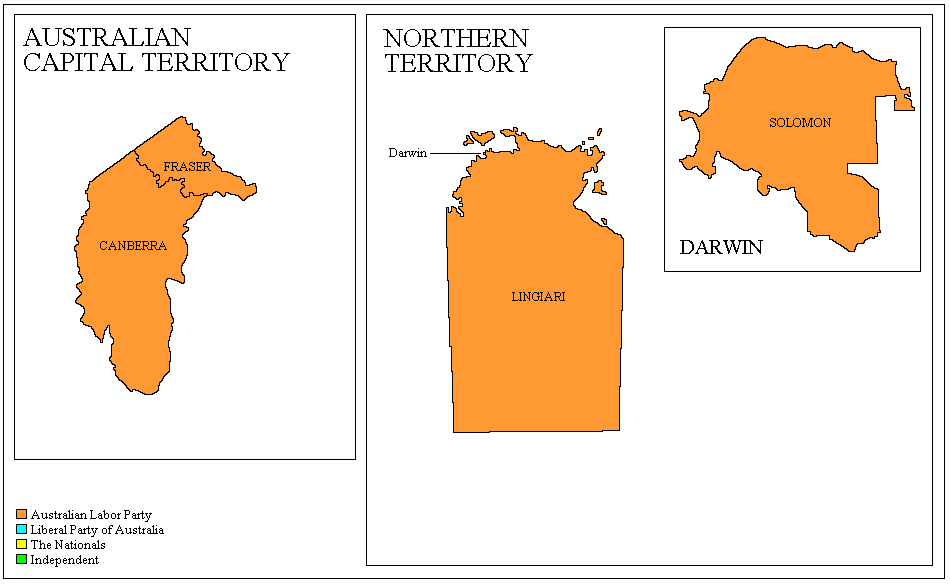
Electoral divisions: Australian Capital Territory (ACT) and the Northern Territory

Turnout 95.85% (CV) — Informal 2.31%
Party	Votes	%	Swing	Seats	Change
Labor	114,244	51.10	+0.85	2	Steady
Liberal	74,295	33.23	–2.00	0	Steady
Australian Greens	29,424	13.16	+2.40		
Australian Democrats	2,509	1.12	–1.28		
Citizens Electoral Council	1,295	0.58	+0.21		
Socialist Alliance	539	0.24	–0.75		
Independents	1,275	0.57	+0.57		
Total	223,581			2	
Two-party-preferred vote
Labor	141,745	63.40	+1.86	2	Steady
Liberal	81,836	36.60	–1.86	0	Steady
Invalid/blank votes		5,289	2.31	−1.13	
Registered voters/turnout		238,786	95.85		
Source: Commonwealth Election 2007

=== Canberra ===
2007 Australian federal election: Canberra
Party	Candidate	Votes	%	±%
Labor	Annette Ellis	58,711	51.10	+1.17
Liberal	Natalie Colbert	40,359	35.13	−1.56
Greens	Amanda Bresnan	14,878	12.95	+2.65
Citizens Electoral Council	John Holder	953	0.83	+0.13
Total formal votes		114,901	97.74	+1.11
Informal votes		2,660	2.26	−1.11
Turnout		117,561	96.05	+0.91
Two-party-preferred result
Labor	Annette Ellis	71,030	61.82	+1.91
Liberal	Natalie Colbert	43,871	38.18	−1.91
Labor hold		Swing	+1.91	

=== Fraser ===
2007 Australian federal election: Fraser
Party	Candidate	Votes	%	±%
Labor	Bob McMullan	55,533	51.10	+0.50
Liberal	Troy Williams	33,936	31.23	−2.41
Greens	Meredith Hunter	14,546	13.38	+2.12
Democrats	Darren Churchill	2,509	2.31	−0.27
Independent	Kerri Taranto	1,275	1.17	+1.17
Socialist Alliance	Farida Iqbal	539	0.50	−1.42
Citizens Electoral Council	Jim Arnold	342	0.31	+0.31
Total formal votes		108,680	97.64	+1.15
Informal votes		2,629	2.36	−1.15
Turnout		111,309	95.67	+0.92
Two-party-preferred result
Labor	Bob McMullan	70,715	65.07	+1.75
Liberal	Troy Williams	37,965	34.93	−1.75
Labor hold		Swing	+1.75	

== Northern Territory ==
2007 Australian federal election (Northern Territory)
← 2004	24 November 2007	2010 →

All 2 Northern Territory seats in the Australian House of Representatives and all 2 seats in the Australian Senate
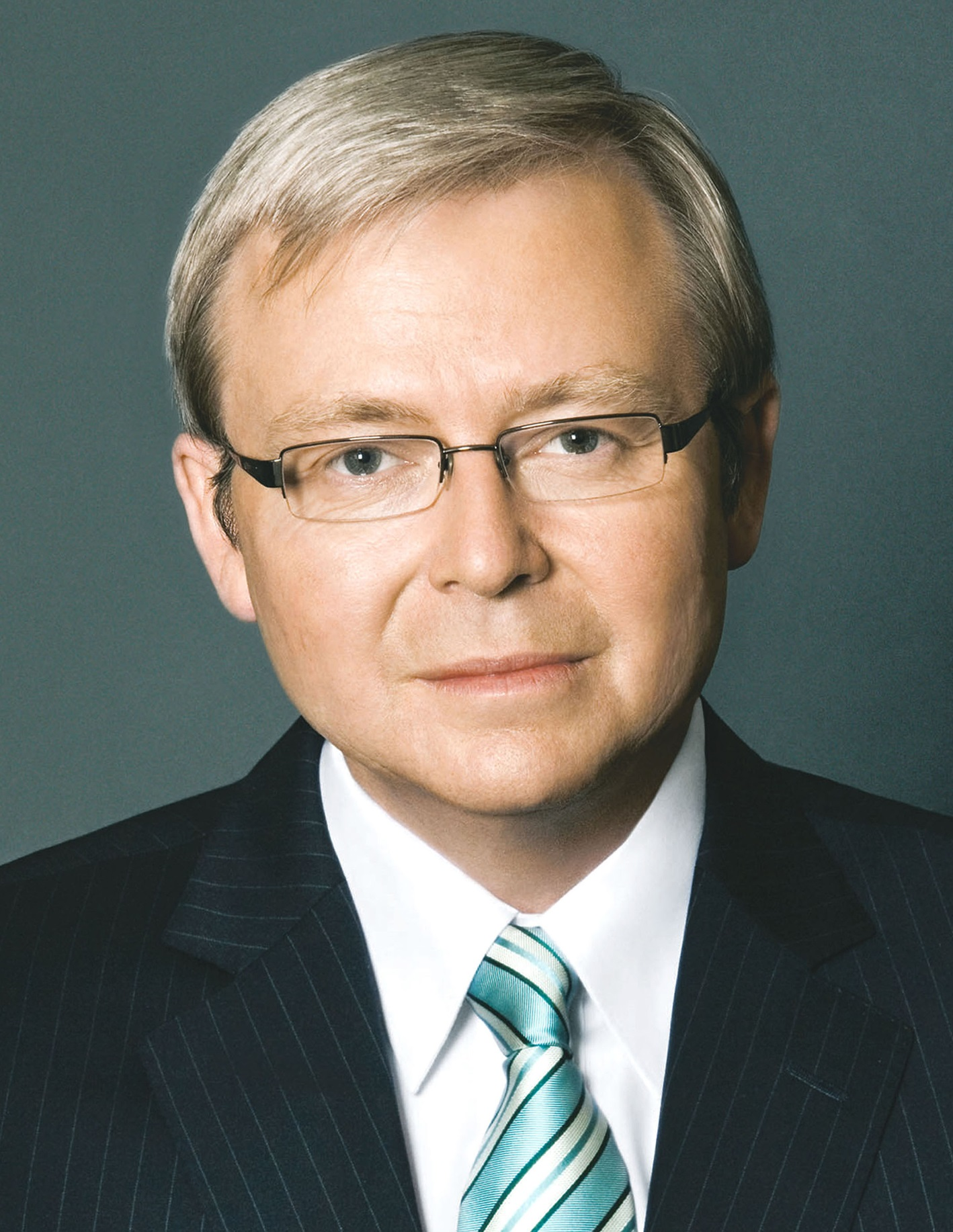

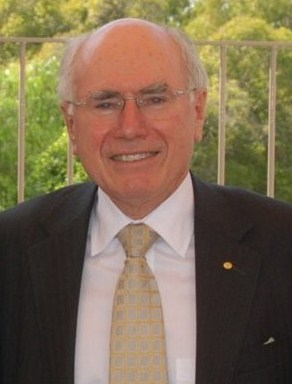
	First party	Second party
Leader	Kevin Rudd	John Howard
Party	Labor	Liberal/National coalition
Last election	1 seat	1 seat
Seats won	2	0
Seat change	▲1	▼1
Popular vote	46,794	40,298
Percentage	47.65%	41.03
Swing	▲3.38	▼2.81
TPP	55.41%	44.59%
TPP swing	▲3.26	▼3.26

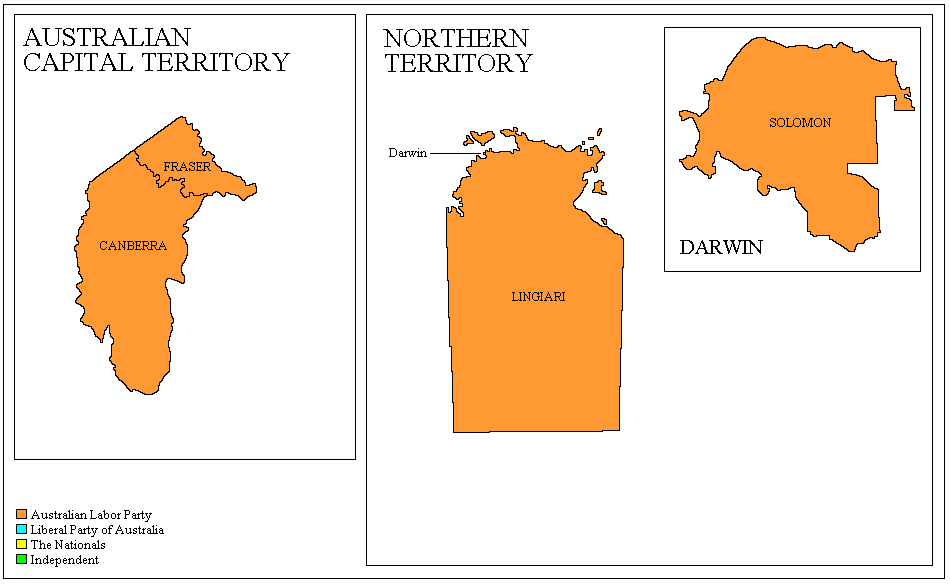
Electoral divisions: Australian Capital Territory (ACT) and the Northern Territory

Turnout 86.53% (CV) — Informal 3.85%
Party	Votes	%	Swing	Seats	Change
Labor	46,794	47.65	+3.38	2	▲1
Country Liberal	40,298	41.03	–2.81	0	▼1
Greens	7,903	8.05	+1.84		
Liberty and Democracy Party	358	0.36	+0.36		
Citizens Electoral Council	245	0.25	–0.01		
Independents	2,615	2.66	+0.70		
Total	98,213			2	
Two-party-preferred vote
Labor	54,418	55.41	+3.26	2	▲1
Country Liberal	43,795	44.59	–3.26	0	▼1
Invalid/blank votes		3,936	3.85	−0.60	
Registered voters/turnout		118,045	86.53		
Source: Commonwealth Election 2007

CLP to Labor: Solomon.

=== Lingiari ===
2007 Australian federal election: Lingiari
Party	Candidate	Votes	%	±%
Labor	Warren Snowdon	25,213	53.99	+3.33
Country Liberal	Adam Giles	16,189	34.66	−3.70
Greens	Emma Young	3,231	6.92	+1.34
Independent	Maurie Ryan	1,206	2.58	+2.58
Independent	Wayne Wright	864	1.85	+1.85
Total formal votes		46,703	95.15	+0.09
Informal votes		2,381	4.85	−0.09
Turnout		49,084	81.34	+3.63
Two-party-preferred result
Labor	Warren Snowdon	28,565	61.16	+3.50
Country Liberal	Adam Giles	18,138	38.84	−3.50
Labor hold		Swing	+3.50	

=== Solomon ===
2007 Australian federal election: Solomon
Party	Candidate	Votes	%	±%
Country Liberal	Dave Tollner	24,109	46.80	−1.95
Labor	Damian Hale	21,581	41.90	+3.37
Greens	Debbie Hudson	4,672	9.07	+2.30
Independent	Maurice Foley	545	1.06	−0.44
Liberty & Democracy	Jacques Chester	358	0.70	+0.70
Citizens Electoral Council	Trudy Campbell	245	0.48	−0.01
Total formal votes		51,510	97.07	+0.98
Informal votes		1,555	2.93	−1.07
Turnout		53,065	91.29	+0.98
Two-party-preferred result
Labor	Damian Hale	25,853	50.19	+3.00
Country Liberal	Dave Tollner	25,657	49.81	−3.00
Labor gain from Country Liberal		Swing	+3.00	

== See also ==
- Members of the Australian House of Representatives, 2007–2010
