= Sports rorts affair (2020) =

Australian political controversy

The "sports rorts" affair, also called the McKenzie scandal, is a scandal involving the Sport Australia's Community Sport Infrastructure Program that engulfed Senator Bridget McKenzie, the then Minister for Sport in the Morrison government commencing in February 2019.

On 15 January 2020, the Australian National Audit Office published a report into the Community Sport Infrastructure Program titled 'Award of Funding under the Community Sport Infrastructure Program'. The report had two main conclusions: the award of grant funding was not informed by an appropriate assessment process and sound advice and the successful applications were not those that had been assessed as the most meritorious in terms of the published program guidelines. The outcomes of the report resulted in extensive media coverage due to Minister McKenzie using her ministerial discretion to favour marginal or targeted electorates in the allocation of grants in the lead up to 2019 Australian federal election.

The scandal was compared to the sports rorts affair in 1993–1994 that resulted in the resignation of Ros Kelly, Minister for Sport in the Keating government.

== Background ==
The Community Sport Infrastructure Grant Program was established by the Turnbull government as part of its 2018 Australian federal budget, which allocated A$27.9 million for the program. The December 2018 Mid-Year Economic and Fiscal Outlook (MYEFO) and 2019 Australian federal budget allocated a further A$30.3 million and A$42.5 million to the program with the total allocation of A$102.5 million.

The aim of the program was for more Australians to have access to quality sporting facilities, encouraging greater community participation in sport and physical activity. Sport Australia was given the responsibility for administering the program and its guidelines identified three aspects with appropriate weightings: community participation (50%); community need (25%); and project design and delivery (25%). However, Sports Australia did not establish a framework for assessing the three aspects inline with the program objectives. The decision-making process involved Sport Australia assessment panel assessing applications, all eligible applications subjectively assessed as meeting the criteria were submitted to the Sport Australia board for its endorsement and the Minister for Sport identified as the final funding decision-maker as to the extent the proposal met the program objectives. Applications opened on 2 August 2018 and closed on 14 September 2018. Sport Australia received 2056 project proposals seeking more than A$396.6 million in Australian government funding. Funding totalling A$102.5 million was approved for 684 projects, which due to the large number and great variety, were assessed in three rounds completed in December 2018, February 2019 and April 2019.

The program came under media and the Australian Labor Party Opposition attention when Georgina Downer, Liberal Party of Australia candidate for Mayo was photographed presenting a mock cheque for A$127,373 to the Yankalilla Bowling Club in February 2019. This presentation was not approved either by the Government or Sports Australia, but was the initiative of the candidate as part of her electioneering. The Shadow Attorney-General, Mark Dreyfus requested that the Australian National Audit Office (ANAO) investigate the management of the program.

== ANAO report ==
The Australian National Audit Office (ANAO) on 15 January 2020 released its report titled "Award of Funding under the Community Sport Infrastructure Program". The ANAO found there were two processes in awarding grant: Sport Australia providing ranking lists based on three factors which were subjectively assessed, and the minister's office later produced a list based on its subjective assessment that the proposal was more in line with the programs objective, with a colour-coded spreadsheet highlighting types of electorates. The report found that in the first round, 91 of the projects (41%) approved by the Minister were not on the preliminary list endorsed by the Sport Australia board. In the second round, 162 (70%) of the projects initially recommended were not included, and in the final round 167 (73%) of the approved projects had not been initially recommended by Sport Australia. ANAO also found that while the guidelines identified the Minister in an approval role, there are no records that evidence that the Department of Health or Sport Australia advised the Minister on the legal basis on which the Minister could undertake an approval role. The report recommended that Sport Australia improve its grants management for high demand programs and improve conflict of interest guidelines.

== Consequences of ANAO report ==
The ANAO report led to extensive media coverage and its outcomes were compared to the 1993–1994 sports rorts affair within the Keating government.

McKenzie's response to the report was that it was "a very popular program that funded 684 projects right across the country to help get people up and moving" and "all projects selected for funding were eligible to receive it." McKenzie also highlighted that the final list of approvals was not a Sports Rort, as the outcome was "reverse pork-barrelling" because Labor seats benefited from her ministerial intervention. Australian Labor Party spokesman for sport Don Farrell called for Senator McKenzie to resign and made the following comments about grants awarded in April 2019, just weeks out from the May 18 election "more than 400 grassroots sports club had their applications, which were highly regarded by Sport Australia, thrown out by this government so they could funnel money into marginal seats instead."

McKenzie resigned as deputy leader of the Nationals and from her ministerial portfolio on 2 February 2020, after a report by the Secretary of the Department of Prime Minister and Cabinet found that she had breached ministerial standards by not declaring her membership of one of the clubs which had received funding under the program. The planned deputy leadership contest culminated into a larger National leadership spill, resulting in the resignation of Nationals MP Matt Canavan from the cabinet and the resignation of Llew O'Brien from the Nationals party room.

== Gaetjens report ==
Prime Minister Morrison commissioned an investigation by the Secretary of the Department of the Prime Minister and Cabinet. The resulting report, handed down in early February 2020, indicated that there was "no basis for the suggestion that political considerations were the primary determining factor" and did not unduly influence the decision-making process; though what influence this report (known as the Gaetjens report) found political considerations actually had is unknown. Morrison said the Gaetjens report was a cabinet document and therefore would not be made public.

Labor, Greens and the crossbenches in the Senate demanded the release of the report. On 12 February 2020, the Senate voted down a motion which would have stripped Senate government leader Mathias Cormann of his ability to represent the Prime Minister in the chamber until 6 March, unless the government tabled the report.

John Hewson, who as the Liberal Opposition leader led the attack on then Sports Minister Ros Kelly in the 1993–94 sports rorts affair which led to Kelly's resignation, condemned Prime Minister Morrison's disregard for the auditor general's report into the sports grant program. He described this current sports saga as even worse than the 1993–94 sports rorts affair and joined in calling for Senator McKenzie's resignation. Hewson had months earlier revealed that he was no longer a member of the Liberal Party meaning he did not face any repercussions for this criticism of the Prime Minister.

== Senate Select Committee on Administration of Sports Grants ==
In February 2020, the Senate established Select Committee to inquire into and report on the administration and award of funding under the Community Sport Infrastructure Grants. The Committee accepted submissions and held several hearings. An interim report was released in December 2020. Final report was tabled in Parliament in March 2021. The final report examined and made recommendations in relation to Sport Australia's processes and authority in relation to the grants, the role of the Prime Minister's Office in the grants process and development of a coordinated national policy framework for community sport infrastructure.

== See also ==
- 2020 National Party of Australia leadership spill
