= 2020 National Party of Australia leadership spill =

Declaration of a political vcacancy

- 4 February 2020
- Leadership election
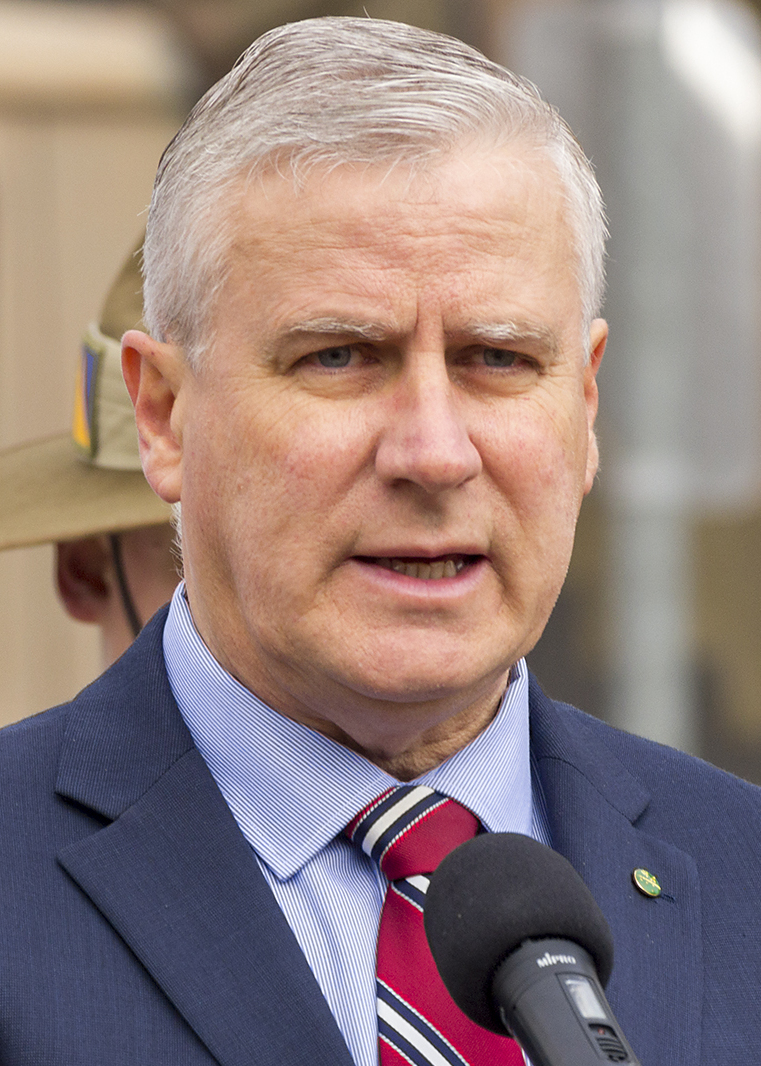

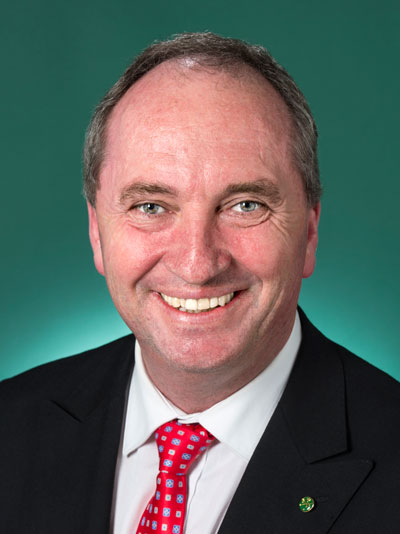
Candidate	Michael McCormack	Barnaby Joyce
Caucus vote	≥11 (Note: The National Party does not release the results of their internal elections.)	<11
Seat	Riverina (NSW)	New England (NSW)
Leader before election
Michael McCormack
Elected Leader
Michael McCormack
- Deputy leadership election

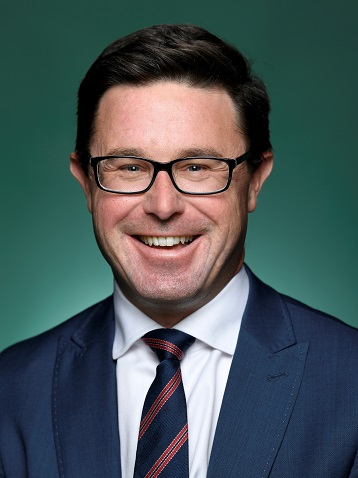

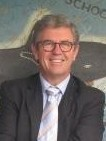

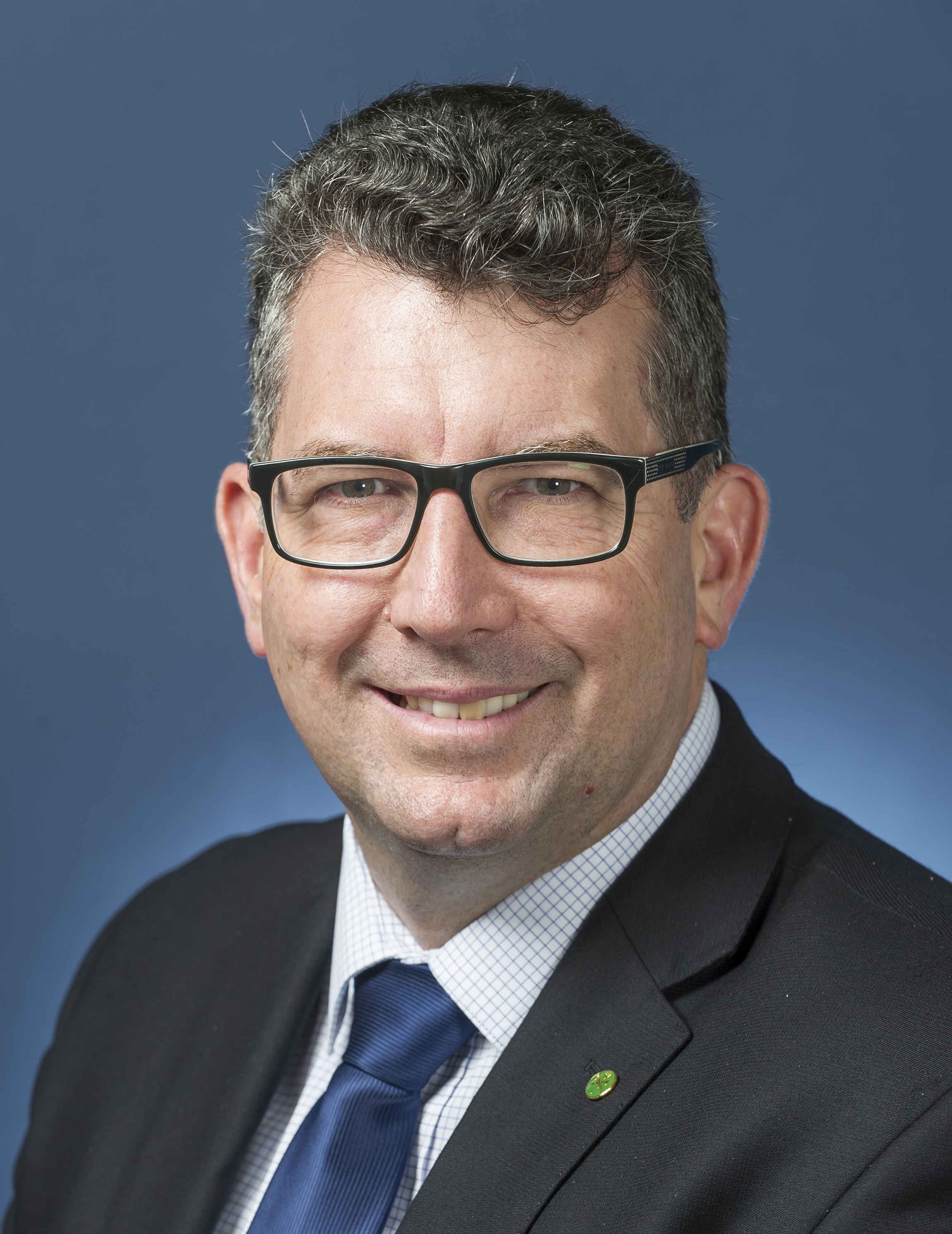
Candidate	David Littleproud	David Gillespie	Keith Pitt
Caucus vote	≥11	<11	<11
Seat	Maranoa (QLD)	Lyne (NSW)	Hinkler (QLD)
Deputy Leader before election
Bridget McKenzie
Elected Deputy Leader
David Littleproud

A leadership spill for the federal leadership of the National Party of Australia was held on 4 February 2020, and was called by the Member for Wide Bay, Llew O'Brien.

The spill was called amid reports that former Deputy Prime Minister and Nationals leader Barnaby Joyce was considering a challenge against the incumbent, Michael McCormack. Following the spill in the regularly scheduled party room meeting, McCormack retained his position as leader. Some National MPs claimed the vote was as close as 11 to 10, however others say it was closer to 16-5.

A ballot for the deputy leadership was also held following Bridget McKenzie's resignation following the 2018–20 "Sports rorts" affair. It was won by David Littleproud.

== Candidates ==
=== Declared ===
Leader

- Michael McCormack, incumbent leader
- Barnaby Joyce, MP for New England

Deputy Leader

- David Gillespie, MP for Lyne
- Keith Pitt, MP for Hinkler and Assistant Minister to the Deputy Prime Minister
- David Littleproud, MP for Maranoa and Minister for Water Resources

=== Declined ===
Deputy Leader

- Matt Canavan, Senator for Queensland, Minister for Resources and Northern Australia
- Darren Chester, MP for Gippsland

== Aftermath ==
As Matt Canavan resigned the day before the spill to support Joyce in the leadership spill, Canavan joined McKenzie in the backbenches. However, they remained deputy and leader of the Nationals in the Senate, despite losing their ministerial portfolios, as the other three Nationals senators were first-termers and thus considered ill-equipped to assume the leadership positions.

On 10 February 2020, O'Brien quit the Nationals party room and sat with neither Nationals nor the Liberals, but remained a member of the Liberal National Party and sat with the Morrison government in parliament. The following day he was elected the Deputy Speaker of the House of Representatives, having been nominated by the Labor Opposition to the position made vacant by the resignation of Kevin Hogan, who had recently been elevated to the Ministry. O'Brien was elected over the Government's nominated choice, Nationals MP Damian Drum. O'Brien returned to sit in the Nationals party room in December 2020.
