= John Haslem (politician) =

Australian politician

Member of the Australian Parliament for Canberra
- In office 13 December 1975 – 18 October 1980
- Preceded by: Kep Enderby
- Succeeded by: Ros Kelly

Personal details
- Born: 1 February 1939 (age 87) Melbourne
- Party: Liberal Party of Australia
- Spouse: Caryl Lynette Haslem
- Children: Emma-Jane Scambler, Benjamin Haslem, Sophie Haslem
- Education: Melbourne University
- Occupation: Businessman

John Whitton Haslem (born 1 February 1939) was born in Melbourne, Victoria and educated at Brighton Grammar School and Melbourne University where he attained an LLB and B.Com. His early career was as a solicitor in Melbourne before moving to Canberra in 1965 to join the Federal Department of Trade and Industry. He returned to legal practice in 1970 with a leading Canberra law firm, Macphillamy Cummins & Gibson, where he became a Partner. In 1975 he stood for pre-selection for the Federal Electorate of Canberra for the Liberal Party.

He was elected as the first Liberal Party member for the House of Representatives electorate of Canberra in 1975, serving until his defeat by the Labor Party's Ros Kelly in the 1980 election. His notable achievement in office being his service on the Parliamentary Committee that initiated and launched the New Parliament House.

After leaving Parliament he returned to the practice of law in Canberra as a Partner in National firm Dawson Waldron, now owned by Ashurst LLC. In 1989, Haslem unsuccessfully sought election to the inaugural ACT Legislative Assembly, running as an independent candidate.

He later became Chairman of an Australian top ten legal firm. He also with his wife (Caryl Haslem) interested himself in investing in award-winning food, wine and cooking businesses. He is a keen Rotarian, supporter of private schools, and business associations in Canberra, and from 2000, on the south coast of New South Wales. He owned and grew three national real estate franchises in the coastal area and today continues to work as a successful real estate agent in Batemans Bay. In 2018 he was elected as National President of The Association of Former Members of the Parliament of Australia.

Parliament of Australia
Preceded by Kep Enderby	Member for Canberra; 1975–1980	Succeeded by Ros Kelly
