= 1995 Canberra by-election =

← 1993	25 March 1995	1996 →
- Opinion polls
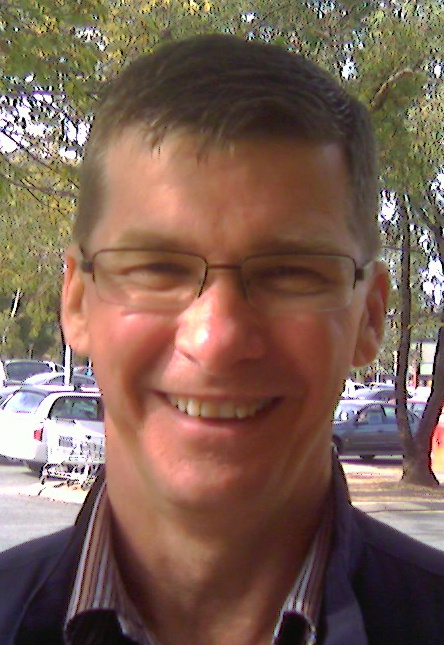

	First party	Second party	Third party
Candidate	Brendan Smyth	Sue Robinson	James Warden
Party	Liberal	Labor	Greens
Popular vote	39,021	25,689	10,835
Percentage	46.29%	30.48%	12.85%
Swing	▲10.07	▼21.78	▲12.85
TPP	56.58%	43.42%
TPP swing	▲16.12	▼16.12
MP before election
Ros Kelly
Labor
Elected MP
Brendan Smyth
Liberal

The 1995 Canberra by-election was held in the Australian electorate of Canberra in Australian Capital Territory on 25 March 1995. The by-election was triggered by the resignation of the sitting member, the Australian Labor Party's Ros Kelly on 30 January 1995. The writ for the by-election was issued on 17 February 1995.

The by-election was won by Liberal Party candidate Brendan Smyth, making it the first (and currently the only) by-election in the ACT to have been won by the Liberal Party.

The by-election took place in the shadow of the "sports rorts" affair which resulted in Kelly's resignation as a minister.

Smyth would later contest the new seat of Namadgi at the 1996 election but was defeated. Subsequent to his career in Federal Parliament, Smyth became leader of the ACT Liberal Party from 2002 to 2006.

This was the last by election that the Liberal Party took a seat off of another party.

== Results ==
1995 Canberra by-election
Party	Candidate	Votes	%	±%
Liberal	Brendan Smyth	39,021	46.29	+10.07
Labor	Sue Robinson	25,689	30.48	−21.78
Greens	James Warden	10,835	12.85	+12.85
Against Further Immigration	Robyn Spencer	3,515	4.17	+4.17
Independent	Joanne Clarke	2,274	2.70	+2.70
Independent	Jerzy Gray-Grzeszkiewicz	1,956	2.32	+2.32
Republican	Joseph Cotta	1,003	1.19	+1.19
Total formal votes		84,293	96.46	−0.68
Informal votes		3,095	3.54	+0.68
Turnout		87,388	88.57	−8.39
Two-party-preferred result
Liberal	Brendan Smyth	47,672	56.58	+16.12
Labor	Sue Robinson	36,577	43.42	−16.12
Liberal gain from Labor		Swing	+16.12	

== Opinion polling ==
=== Voting intention ===
Date	Firm	Interview mode	Sample size	Primary vote						2PP	
Date	Firm	Interview mode	Sample size	LIB	ALP	GRN	AAFI	OTH	UND	LIB	ALP
25 March 1995	1995 by-election	—	84,293	46.29%	30.48%	12.85%	4.17%	6.21%	—	56.58%	43.42%
27 February−2 March 1995	Internal Labor polling		505	40.2%	30.7%	9.0%	—	11% (Note: Independents had 11%.)	5%	—	—
18 February 1995	Liberal Party wins ACT election with 7 seats										
28 January−7 February 1995	Canberra Times/Datacol	Telephone	916	29%	38%	3%	—	4% (Note: The Democrats had 3% and independents had 2%.)	26%	—	—
13 March 1993	1993 election	—	92,382	36.22%	52.26%	3.46%	—	8.05% (Note: The Australian Democrats had 5.34%, the Abolish Self Government Coalition had 1.85% and the Natural Law Party had 0.86%.)	—	40.44%	59.56%

== See also ==
- List of Australian federal by-elections
