= Alicia Payne =

Australian politician (born 1982)

Alicia Payne MP

Member of the Australian Parliament for Canberra
- Incumbent
- Assumed office 18 May 2019
- Preceded by: Gai Brodtmann

Personal details
- Born: 24 July 1982 (age 44) Canberra, ACT, Australia
- Party: Labor
- Education: University of Sydney
- Occupation: Researcher
- Website: www.aliciapayne.com.au

Alicia Emma Payne (born 24 July 1982) is an Australian politician who has been a member of the House of Representatives since the 2019 federal election. She is a member of the Australian Labor Party (ALP) and represents the Division of Canberra in the Australian Capital Territory (ACT).

== Early life ==
Payne was born in Canberra. She attended Kambah High School before going on to study economics at the University of Sydney. Before entering politics, she worked at the National Centre For Social And Economic Modelling (NATSEM) and at the Department of the Treasury.

== Politics ==
Payne joined the Labor Party in 2006. She has worked as a political staffer for several Labor MPs, serving as a senior adviser to Lindsay Tanner and Bill Shorten and later as chief of staff to Jenny Macklin. In September 2018, she won ALP preselection for the Division of Canberra, replacing the retiring MP Gai Brodtmann. Before her preselection, she was the vice-president of the Australian Labor Party (Australian Capital Territory Branch). Payne retained Canberra for her party at the 2019 federal election. She is factionally unaligned.

Parliament of Australia
Preceded by Gai Brodtmann	Member for Canberra; 2019–present	Incumbent
