= Results of the 1993 Australian federal election in territories =

This is a list of electoral division results for the Australian 1993 federal election for the Australian Capital Territory and the Northern Territory.

== Australian Capital Territory ==
1993 Australian federal election (Australian Capital Territory)
- 13 March 1993

Both Australian Capital Territory seats in the Australian House of Representatives and both seats in the Australian Senate

| | First party | Second party |
|---|---|---|
| Leader | Paul Keating | John Hewson |
| Party | Labor | Coalition |
| Last election | 2 seats | 0 seats |
| Seats won | 2 | 0 |
| Seat change | Steady | Steady |
| Popular vote | 99,993 | 61,535 |
| Percentage | 53.34% | 34.19% |
| Swing | ▲8.46 | ▼0.64 |
| TPP | 61.2% | 38.8% |
| TPP swing | ▲2.6 | ▼2.6 |

Turnout 96.7% (CV) — Informal 3.4%
| Party | Votes | % | Swing | Seats | Change |
|---|---|---|---|---|---|
| Labor | 95,993 | 53.34 | +8.46 | 2 | Steady |
| Liberal | 61,535 | 34.19 | –0.64 | | Steady |
| Democrats | 10,355 | 5.75 | –8.67 | | |
| Green Democratic | 3,109 | 1.73 | –2.06 | | |
| Abolish Self Govt | 1,663 | 0.92 | | | |
| Natural Law | 1,429 | 0.79 | | | |
| Independent | 5,885 | 3.27 | +2.68 | | |
| Total | 179,969 | | | 2 | |
Two-party-preferred vote
| Labor | 110,055 | 61.2 | +2.6 | 2 | Steady |
| Liberal | 69,796 | 38.8 | –2.6 | 0 | Steady |
| Invalid/blank votes | 6,240 | 3.35 | +0.40 | | |
| Turnout | 186,209 | 96.74 | | | |
| Registered voters | 192,487 | | | | |
Source: Federal Elections 1993

=== Canberra ===
1993 Australian federal election: Canberra
| Party | Candidate | Votes | % | ±% |
|---|---|---|---|---|
| Labor | Ros Kelly | 46,895 | 52.26 | +8.53 |
| Liberal | Bill Stefaniak | 32,504 | 36.22 | −2.34 |
| Democrats | Peter Myers | 4,796 | 5.34 | −7.40 |
| Green Democratic | Greg Adamson | 3,109 | 3.46 | +3.46 |
| Abolish Self Govt | Mike Trevethan | 1,663 | 1.85 | +1.85 |
| Natural Law | Sally Kelly | 775 | 0.86 | +0.86 |
| Total formal votes | | 89,742 | 97.14 | −0.28 |
| Informal votes | | 2,640 | 2.86 | +0.28 |
| Turnout | | 92,382 | 96.96 | |
Two-party-preferred result
| Labor | Ros Kelly | 53,432 | 59.56 | +3.82 |
| Liberal | Bill Stefaniak | 36,275 | 40.44 | −3.82 |
| Labor hold | | Swing | +3.82 | |

=== Fraser ===
1993 Australian federal election: Fraser
| Party | Candidate | Votes | % | ±% |
|---|---|---|---|---|
| Labor | John Langmore | 49,098 | 54.42 | +8.52 |
| Liberal | Martin Dunn | 29,031 | 32.18 | +0.64 |
| Democrats | Greg Kramer | 5,559 | 6.16 | −9.75 |
| Independent | David Eastman | 2,070 | 2.29 | +2.29 |
| | Sue Bolton | 2,023 | 2.24 | +2.24 |
| Independent | Emile Brunoro | 672 | 0.74 | −0.37 |
| Independent | Kev Wise | 657 | 0.73 | +0.73 |
| Natural Law | Andrew Gordon | 654 | 0.72 | +0.72 |
| Independent | Peter Joseph | 463 | 0.51 | +0.51 |
| Total formal votes | | 90,227 | 96.16 | −0.56 |
| Informal votes | | 3,600 | 3.84 | +0.56 |
| Turnout | | 90,227 | 96.52 | |
Two-party-preferred result
| Labor | John Langmore | 56,623 | 62.81 | +1.78 |
| Liberal | Martin Dunn | 33,521 | 37.19 | −1.78 |
| Labor hold | | Swing | +1.78 | |

== Northern Territory ==
1993 Australian federal election (Northern Territory)
- 13 March 1993

The one Northern Territory seat in the Australian House of Representatives and both seats in the Australian Senate

| | First party | Second party |
|---|---|---|
| Leader | Paul Keating | John Hewson |
| Party | Labor | Coalition |
| Last election | 1 seat | 0 seats |
| Seats won | 1 | 0 |
| Seat change | Steady | Steady |
| Popular vote | 43,578 | 35,207 |
| Percentage | 55.31% | 44.69% |
| Swing | ▲5.35 | ▼9.5 |
| TPP | 55.3% | 44.7% |
| TPP swing | ▲0.3 | ▼0.3 |

=== Northern Territory ===
1993 Australian federal election: Northern Territory
| Party | Candidate | Votes | % | ±% |
|---|---|---|---|---|
| Labor | Warren Snowdon | 43,578 | 55.31 | +5.35 |
| Country Liberal | Arthur Palmer | 35,207 | 44.69 | +4.15 |
| Total formal votes | | 78,785 | 96.90 | +0.28 |
| Informal votes | | 2,518 | 3.10 | −0.28 |
| Turnout | | 81,303 | 88.79 | |
| Labor hold | | Swing | +0.29 | |

== See also ==
- Results of the 1993 Australian federal election (House of Representatives)
- Members of the Australian House of Representatives, 1993–1996
