= 1996 Australian federal election =

- 2 March 1996

All 148 seats in the House of Representatives 75 seats were needed for a majority in the House 40 (of the 76) seats in the Senate
- Registered: 11,740,568 ▲3.13%
- Turnout: 11,244,017 (95.77%) (▲0.02 pp)
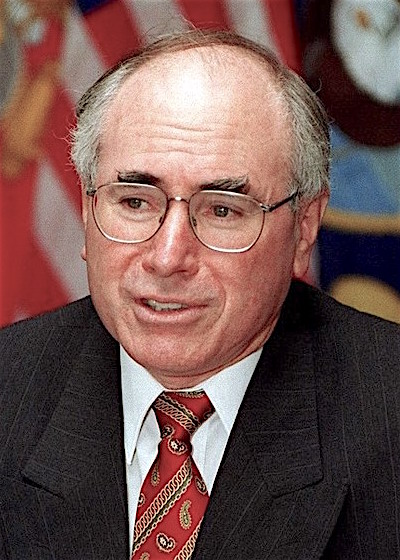

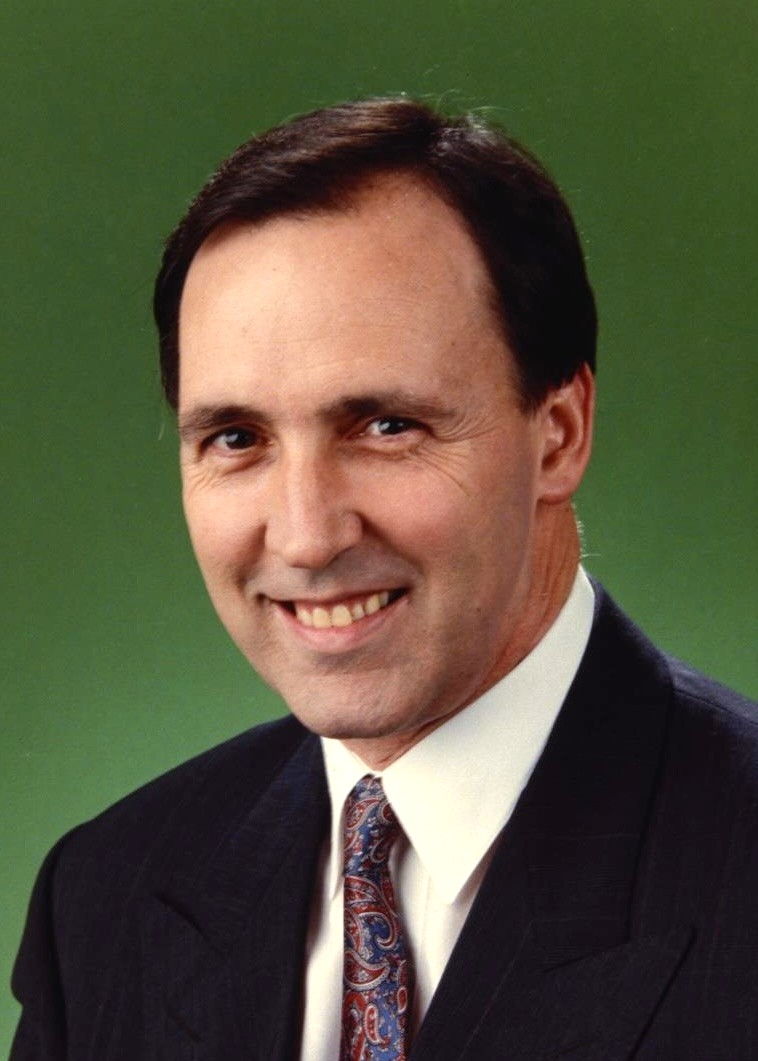
	First party	Second party
Leader	John Howard	Paul Keating
Party	Coalition	Labor
Leader since	30 January 1995	19 December 1991
Leader's seat	Bennelong (NSW)	Blaxland (NSW)
Last election	65 seats	80 seats
Seats won	94	49
Seat change	▲29	▼31
Primary vote	5,142,161	4,217,765
Percentage	47.25%	38.75%
Swing	▲2.98%	▼6.17%
TPP	53.63%	46.37%
TPP swing	▲5.07	▼5.07
- Results by division for the House of Representatives, shaded by winning party's margin of victory.
Prime Minister before election
Paul Keating
Labor
Subsequent Prime Minister
John Howard
Liberal/National coalition

A federal election was held on 2 March 1996 to elect members of the 38th Parliament of Australia. All 148 seats of the House of Representatives were up for election, along with 40 of the 76 seats in the Senate. The Liberal–National Coalition led by Opposition Leader John Howard defeated the incumbent Labor government led by Prime Minister Paul Keating in a landslide victory. The Coalition won 94 seats in the House of Representatives, at the time the largest number of seats won by a federal government to date (since tied with Labor's win in 2025). It was also only the second time that a party or alliance had won over 90 seats at a federal election; the first occurred in the Coalition's 1975 victory.

The election marked the end of the five-term, 13-year Hawke-Keating Government that began in 1983. Howard was sworn in as the new prime minister of Australia on 11 March 1996, along with the First Howard Ministry. This election was the start of the 11-year Howard Government; Labor would remain in opposition until the 2007 election.

This was the first federal election that future prime minister Tony Abbott contested as a member of parliament, having entered parliament at the 1994 Warringah by-election. Future prime minister Anthony Albanese and future opposition leader Brendan Nelson also entered parliament at this election.

Future prime ministers Kevin Rudd and Julia Gillard were unsuccessful candidates for the House of Representatives and Senate respectively, but were elected to the House of Representatives at the next election, in 1998.

Howard became the first Liberal leader to win an election from opposition since Robert Menzies in 1949. (Malcolm Fraser was caretaker prime minister in the 1975 election.) The victory also saw the Liberal Party gain enough seats to not require the support of the National Party, though John Howard opted to stay in the Coalition. As of 2025, this is the last time the Liberal Party has won an overall majority of seats in federal parliament. It is also the last where both major party leaders were born prior to 1946, the first year of the Post-war era.

== Background ==
John Howard, who had previously led the Liberal Party from 1985 to 1989, returned to the leadership in January 1995 following the party's disastrous eight months under the leadership of Alexander Downer. Downer and deputy PM Peter Costello had succeeded John Hewson and Michael Wooldridge early in 1994 and were touted as the leaders of the new-generation Liberals. In the end the party opted for the seasoned Howard, perhaps an acknowledgement that he was the only one left standing after a decade of party infighting.

== Campaign ==
Howard focussed the Coalition's attacks mainly on the governing record of the long-serving Labor government, refusing to detail specific policy proposals. Keating's handling of the recession was particularly unpopular, exemplified by his infamous description of it as "a recession that Australia had to have." Although Keating's big-picture approach to republicanism, reconciliation with Australia's Indigenous peoples and engagement with Asia galvanised support within Labor's urban constituencies, Howard was able to attract support amongst disaffected mainstream Australians, uniting middle-class suburban residents with traditionally Labor-voting blue-collar workers. He also promised to retain Medicare and hold a constitutional convention to decide whether Australia would become a republic.

The election-eve Newspoll reported the Liberal/National Coalition held an estimated 53.5 percent two-party-preferred vote.

In the final week of the campaign, Treasurer Ralph Willis released a letter purporting to be secret correspondence between Howard and Liberal Premier of Victoria, Jeff Kennett. After Howard denounced the letter as a forgery, the news was dominated by the narrative that Labor was dishonestly seeking to undermine Howard. The letter was subsequently revealed to be the work of university students.

== Results ==
=== House of Representatives results ===
Government (94) Coalition Liberal (75) National (18) CLP (1) Opposition (49) Labor (49) Crossbench (5) Independent (5)

House of Reps (IRV) – 1996–1998 – Turnout 94.99% (CV) — Informal 3.78%
Party	Votes	%	Swing	Seats	Change
Liberal	4,210,689	38.69	+1.92	75	▲26
National	893,170	8.21	+1.04	18	▲2
Country Liberal	38,302	0.35	+0.02	1	▲1
Liberal/National Coalition	5,142,161	47.25	+2.98	94	▲29
Labor	4,217,765	38.75	−6.17	49	▼31
Democrats	735,848	6.76	+3.01		
Greens (Note: The Australian Greens were founded in 1992, but not all local organisations immediately affiliated. The Greens total includes Australian Greens, Greens Western Australia, Victorian Greens, Tasmanian Greens, Central Coast Green Party, and Richmond/Clarence Greens.)	317,654	2.92	+1.09		
Independents	262,420	2.41	−0.73	5	▲3
Others	208,004	1.91	+1.05		
Total	10,883,852			148	▲1
Two-party-preferred vote
Liberal–National coalition	Win	53.63	+5.07	94	▲29
Labor		46.37	−5.07	49	▼31

Popular vote
Labor	38.75%
Liberal	38.69%
National	8.21%
Democrats	6.76%
Greens	1.74%
CLP	0.35%
Independents	2.27%
Other	3.23%

Two-party-preferred vote
Coalition	53.63%
Labor	46.37%

Parliament seats
Coalition	63.51%
Labor	33.11%
Independents	3.38%

=== Senate results ===
Government (37) Coalition Liberal (31) National (5) CLP (1) Opposition (29) Labor (29) Crossbench (10) Democrats (7) Greens (2) Independent (1)

Senate (STV GV) — 1996–99 – Turnout 95.20% (CV) — Informal 3.89%
Group (Note: Parties and candidates may run together in one group, where group votes are allocated top-down within that group.)	First preferences			Seats			
Group	Votes	%	Swing	Seats won	Not up	New total	Change
Liberal–National coalition	4,792,682	43.97	+0.92	20	37	38	▲1
Liberal–National joint ticket	2,669,377	24.49	+0.09	4	4	8	Steady
Liberal–National joint ticket	2,669,377	24.49	+0.09	2	1	3	Steady
Liberal	1,770,486	16.24	+0.65	12	11	22	▲1
National	312,769	2.87	+0.15	1	1	2	Steady
Country Liberal	40,050	0.37	+0.04	1	0	1	Steady
Labor	3,940,150	36.15	−7.35	14	15	29	▼1
Democrats	1,179,357	10.82	+5.51	5	2	7	Steady
Greens (Note: Although the Australian Greens were formed in 1992, the Greens Western Australia and the Tasmanian Greens had not yet aligned with the federal party, Tasmania did following the election.)	345,513	3.17	+0.67	1	1	2	Steady
Australian Greens	261,677	2.40	+0.82	0	0	0	Steady
Tasmanian Greens	26,830	0.25	+0.05	1	0	1	▲1
Others (Note: The independent senator was Brian Harradine (Tasmania).)	641,335	5.88		0	1	Steady	
Total	10,899,037			40	36	76	
Invalid/blank votes	395,442	3.5					
Turnout	11,294,479	96.2					
Registered voters	11,740,568						
Source: Federal Elections 1996

== House of Representatives preference flows ==
- The Democrats contested 138 electorates with preferences slightly favouring Labor (54.02%)
- The Greens contested 102 electorates with preferences favouring Labor (67.10%)

== Seats changing hands ==
Seat	Pre-1996			Swing	Post-1996		
Seat	Party	Member	Margin	Swing	Margin	Member	Party
Bass, Tas	Labor	Silvia Smith	0.03	4.60	4.57	Warwick Smith	Liberal
Bowman, Qld	Labor	Con Sciacca	8.14	9.03	0.89	Andrea West	Liberal
Calare, NSW	Labor	David Simmons	N/A	N/A	13.32	Peter Andren	Independent
Canberra, ACT (Note: Ros Kelly (Labor) had won Canberra at the 1993 election, however she resigned in 1995 and Brendan Smyth (Liberal) won the seat at the resulting by-election.)	Labor	Ros Kelly	9.56	2.04	7.52	Bob McMullan	Labor
Canberra, ACT	Liberal	Brendan Smyth (Note: Brendan Smyth (Liberal) had won Canberra at the 1995 by-election, however he contested the new seat of Namadgi.)	6.58	14.1	7.52	Bob McMullan	Labor
Canning, WA	Labor	George Gear	0.19	0.88	0.69	Ricky Johnston	Liberal
Capricornia, Qld	Labor	Marjorie Henzell	2.78	6.40	3.62	Paul Marek	National
Curtin, WA	Liberal	Allan Rocher	N/A	N/A	7.28	Allan Rocher	Independent
Dickson, Qld	Labor	Michael Lavarch	2.55	5.72	3.17	Tony Smith	Liberal
Eden-Monaro, NSW	Labor	Jim Snow	4.27	9.03	4.76	Gary Nairn	Liberal
Gilmore, NSW	Labor	Peter Knott	0.45	6.69	6.24	Joanna Gash	Liberal
Griffith, Qld	Labor	Ben Humphreys	5.90	7.37	1.47	Graeme McDougall	Liberal
Herbert, Qld	Labor	Ted Lindsay	3.31	9.90	6.59	Peter Lindsay	Liberal
Hughes, NSW	Labor	Robert Tickner	6.42	11.31	4.89	Danna Vale	Liberal
Kalgoorlie, WA	Labor	Graeme Campbell	N/A	N/A	10.35	Graeme Campbell	Independent
Kingston, SA	Labor	Gordon Bilney	1.45	3.46	2.01	Susan Jeanes	Liberal
Leichhardt, Qld	Labor	Peter Dodd	1.33	5.51	4.18	Warren Entsch	Liberal
Lilley, Qld	Labor	Wayne Swan	6.18	6.91	0.73	Elizabeth Grace	Liberal
Lindsay, NSW	Labor	Ross Free	10.22	11.80	1.58	Jackie Kelly (Note: Kelly conceded that she was incapable of being chosen as a member of the House of Representatives while serving as an officer of the RAAF and won the subsequent by-election with an increased margin: Holland, I (2004). "Section 44 of the Constitution". Parliamentary Library of Australia.)	Liberal
Lowe, NSW	Labor	Mary Easson	5.01	7.48	2.47	Paul Zammit	Liberal
Macarthur, NSW	Labor	Chris Haviland	1.28	11.97	10.69	John Fahey	Liberal
Macquarie, NSW	Labor	Maggie Deahm	0.12	6.48	6.36	Kerry Bartlett	Liberal
Makin, SA	Labor	Peter Duncan	3.71	4.79	1.08	Trish Draper	Liberal
McEwen, Vic	Labor	Peter Cleeland	0.69	1.50	2.19	Fran Bailey	Liberal
McMillan, Vic	Labor	Barry Cunningham	0.53	2.60	2.07	Russell Broadbent	Liberal
Moore, WA	Liberal	Paul Filing	N/A	N/A	15.48	Paul Filing	Independent
Moreton, Qld	Labor	Garrie Gibson	0.21	5.30	5.09	Gary Hardgrave	Liberal
Murray, Vic	National	Bruce Lloyd	N/A	N/A	3.70*	Sharman Stone	Liberal
North Sydney, NSW	Independent	Ted Mack	1.8	17.4	15.6	Joe Hockey	Liberal
Northern Territory, NT	Labor	Warren Snowdon	5.31	5.68	0.37	Nick Dondas	Country Liberal
Oxley, Qld	Labor	Les Scott	14.65	19.31**	4.66	Pauline Hanson (Note: Originally ran as a Liberal candidate, however after her views on immigration became known she was disendorsed. However, because the election was being held very soon after many ballot papers listed her as a Liberal. Therefore, John Howard made it clear if she were to win she would not sit as a Liberal MP so she resigned from the party and sat as an Independent. Flipping the seat from Labor to Independent.)	Independent
Page, NSW	Labor	Harry Woods	0.13	4.44	4.31	Ian Causley	National
Parramatta, NSW	Labor	Paul Elliott	3.24	7.11	3.87	Ross Cameron	Liberal
Paterson, NSW	Labor	Bob Horne	3.30	3.73	0.43	Bob Baldwin	Liberal
Petrie, Qld	Labor	Gary Johns	2.15	9.85	7.70	Teresa Gambaro	Liberal
Richmond, NSW	Labor	Neville Newell	1.78	8.53	6.75	Larry Anthony	National
Robertson, NSW	Labor	Frank Walker	5.56	9.12	3.56	Jim Lloyd	Liberal
Swan, WA	Labor	Kim Beazley	0.22	3.93	3.71	Don Randall	Liberal
Wills, Vic	Independent	Phil Cleary	n/a	4.37	n/a	Kelvin Thomson	Labor

- *Figure is Liberal against Nationals.
- **Figure is a swing compared to Liberal vote at the last election.

== Analysis ==
Overall the coalition won 29 seats from Labor while the ALP won 4 seats from the Liberals. These 4 seats were Canberra and Namadgi in the ACT and Isaacs and Bruce in Victoria. The ACT seats, which had been won by the Liberals in a by-election, fell to Labor due to a strong return to the ALP in a traditional Labor town by public servants fearing conservative cuts. The division of Brendan Smyth's seat of Canberra into the two new (of the three) ACT seats limited his campaign to the southernmost Tuggeranong seat of Namadgi where the ACT Labor right wing stood former MLA Annette Ellis who ran a tight grassroots campaign. Isaacs and Bruce fell to Labor due to demographic changes due to a redistribution of electoral boundaries.

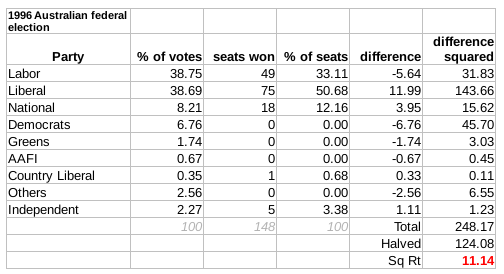
The Gallagher Index result: 11.14

Labor lost five percent of its two-party vote from 1993, and tallied its lowest primary vote since 1934 (an additional eight percent coming from preferences). The swing against Labor would not normally have been enough in and of itself to cause a change of government. However, Labor lost 13 of its 33 seats in New South Wales, and all but two of its 13 seats in Queensland. The 29-seat swing was the second-largest defeat, in terms of seats lost, by a sitting government in Australia. Three members of Keating's government – including Attorney-General Michael Lavarch – lost their seats. Keating resigned as Labor leader on the night of the election, and was succeeded by former deputy prime minister and Finance Minister Kim Beazley.

Due in part to this large swing, Howard entered office with a 45-seat majority, the second-largest in Australian history (behind only the 55-seat majority won by Malcolm Fraser in 1975). The Liberals actually won a majority in their own right at this election with 75 seats, the most the party had ever won. Although Howard had no need for the support of the Nationals, the Coalition was retained. As of 2025, this was the last time the Liberals have won a majority in their own right at a federal election.

Exit polling showed the Coalition winning 47 percent of the blue-collar vote, compared with Labor's 39 percent; there was a 16-point drop in Labor's vote among members of trade unions. The Coalition won 48 percent of the Catholic vote and Labor 37 percent, a reversal of the usual figures.

== See also ==
- Candidates of the 1996 Australian federal election
- Members of the Australian House of Representatives, 1996–1998
- Members of the Australian Senate, 1996–1999
