= Division of Namadgi =

Former Australian federal electoral division

Coordinates: 35°22′03″S 149°06′41″E

Namadgi Australian House of Representatives Division
- Created: 1996
- Abolished: 1998
- Namesake: Namadgi National Park

The Division of Namadgi (namad-jee) was an Australian Electoral Division in the Australian Capital Territory. It was located in the southern suburbs of Canberra, and included all suburbs in the district of Tuggeranong, the southern Woden Valley suburbs of Chifley, Farrer, Isaacs, Mawson, Pearce and Torrens, and the remainder of the ACT south and west of the Murrumbidgee River, reminiscent of the present-day Division of Bean.

The Division was proclaimed at the redistribution of 20 September 1994, and was first contested at the 1996 federal election. It was abolished at the redistribution of 10 December 1997. It was held for the entirety of its existence by former ACT MLA Annette Ellis, who subsequently became the member for Canberra after Namadgi's abolition.

== Members ==
Image	Member	Party	Term	Notes
	Annette Ellis (1946–)	Labor	2 March 1996 – 3 October 1998	Previously a member of the Australian Capital Territory Legislative Assembly. Transferred to the Division of Canberra after Namadgi was abolished in 1998

== Election results ==
=== 1996 ===
1996 Australian federal election: Namadgi
Party	Candidate	Votes	%	±%
Liberal	Brendan Smyth	28,638	45.14	+9.99
Labor	Annette Ellis	28,583	45.06	−8.89
Greens	Shane Rattenbury	4,579	7.22	+7.22
Independent	Derek Rosborough	1,636	2.58	+2.58
Total formal votes		63,436	97.43	+0.33
Informal votes		1,672	2.57	−0.33
Turnout		65,108	97.37	
Two-party-preferred result
Labor	Annette Ellis	32,542	51.51	−9.28
Liberal	Brendan Smyth	30,628	48.49	+9.28
Labor notional hold		Swing	−9.28	

Brendan Smyth (Liberal) was the sitting member for Canberra, having won the seat at the 1995 by-election.
