= Ros Kelly =

Australian politician (born 1948)

The Honourable Ros Kelly AO
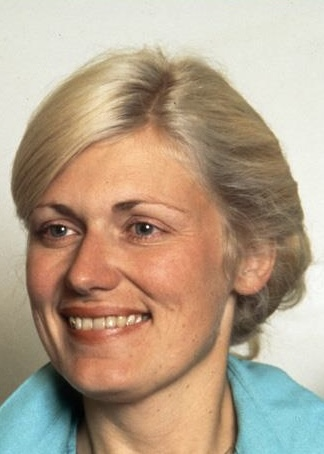

Minister Assisting the Prime Minister for the Status of Women
- In office 23 December 1993 – 1 March 1994
- Prime Minister: Paul Keating
- Preceded by: Wendy Fatin
- Succeeded by: Carmen Lawrence

Minister for the Environment, Sport and Territories
- In office 4 April 1990 – 1 March 1994
- Prime Minister: Bob Hawke; Paul Keating
- Preceded by: Graham Richardson
- Succeeded by: Graham Richardson

Minister for Tourism
- In office 4 April 1990 – 27 December 1991
- Prime Minister: Bob Hawke; Paul Keating
- Preceded by: Graham Richardson
- Succeeded by: Alan Griffiths

Minister for the Arts
- In office 4 April 1990 – 24 March 1993
- Prime Minister: Bob Hawke; Paul Keating
- Preceded by: Graham Richardson
- Succeeded by: Bob McMullan

Minister for Telecommunications and Aviation Support
- In office 6 April 1989 – 4 April 1990
- Prime Minister: Bob Hawke
- Preceded by: Gary Punch
- Succeeded by: Title abolished

Minister for Defence Science and Personnel
- In office 18 September 1987 – 6 April 1989
- Prime Minister: Bob Hawke
- Preceded by: New title
- Succeeded by: David Simmons

Member of the Australian Parliament for Canberra
- In office 18 October 1980 – 30 January 1995
- Preceded by: John Haslem
- Succeeded by: Brendan Smyth

Personal details
- Born: Roslyn Joan Raw; 25 January 1948 (age 78)
- Party: Labor
- Education: University of Sydney
- Occupation: Teacher

Roslyn Joan Kelly AO (née Raw; born 25 January 1948) is an Australian former politician. She was a member of the Australian House of Representatives, having represented the Division of Canberra from 18 October 1980 to 30 January 1995. She was a minister in the governments of Bob Hawke and Paul Keating.

== Early life and ACT politics ==
Kelly is the daughter of Michael and Patricia Raw. She studied at the University of Sydney and received a degree in teaching in 1968 and worked as a secondary school teacher from 1969 until 1974. Kelly was elected to the then advisory Australian Capital Territory House of Assembly as a member for Canberra in 1974. She was a member of the assembly until 1979.

== Federal politics ==
Kelly was elected to the House of Representatives in 1980. In 1983, she was the first Australian Federal MP to give birth while in office. In 1987, she became the first female Labor minister from the House of Representatives, when she was appointed Minister for Defence Science and Personnel. She subsequently held the portfolios of Communications and Aviation Support 1988–90; Arts, Sport, Environment, Tourism and Territories 1991–93; Environment, Sport and Territories 1993–94; and Arts, Sport, the Environment, Tourism and Territories 1994–95. She also served as Minister Assisting the Prime Minister on the Status of Women until 1994.

She suffered considerable embarrassment as a result of the so-called 'sports rorts affair', when she revealed that funding for sporting bodies was arranged on the basis of a group discussion around a "great big whiteboard" in her office. She resigned from the ministry on 28 February 1994 and from parliament 11 months later on 30 January 1995. The resulting by-election on 25 March 1995 saw the loss of the Canberra electorate to the opposition Liberal Party.

== Personal life and honours ==
Kelly is married to David Morgan, the former CEO of Westpac. She was formerly married to journalist Paul Kelly, whose surname she has retained.

Kelly was made an Officer (AO) of the Order of Australia in 2004 for service to the community through promoting corporate environmental responsibility and fostering dialogue between business and conservation groups, to the Australian Parliament, and to women's health.

When acting as minister of Arts, Sport, the Environment, Tourism and Territories, Kelly gave support to research at the Riversleigh World Heritage Area and was honoured for this in the naming of a new species Priscileo roskellyae in 1997.

== See also ==
- List of the first women holders of political offices in Oceania

Political offices
New title	Minister for Defence Science and Personnel; 1987–89	Succeeded by David Simmons
Preceded by Gary Punch	Minister for Telecommunications and Aviation Support; 1989–90	Title abolished
Preceded by Graham Richardson	Minister for Arts, Sport, the Environment, (Tourism) and Territories; 1990–93	Succeeded by Graham Richardson
Preceded by Graham Richardson	Minister for the Environment, Sport and Territories; 1993–94	Succeeded by Graham Richardson
Preceded by Wendy Fatin	Minister assisting the Prime Minister for the Status of Women; 1993–94	Succeeded by Carmen Lawrence
Parliament of Australia
Preceded by John Haslem	Member for Canberra; 1980–95	Succeeded by Brendan Smyth
