= Annette Ellis =

Australian politician (born 1946)

Annette Ellis MP
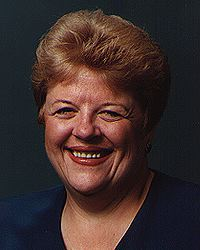

Member of the Australian Parliament for Canberra
- In office 3 October 1998 – 19 July 2010
- Preceded by: Bob McMullan
- Succeeded by: Gai Brodtmann

Member of the Australian Parliament for Namadgi
- In office 2 March 1996 – 3 October 1998
- Preceded by: New seat
- Succeeded by: Seat abolished

Personal details
- Born: 13 October 1946 (age 80) Melbourne, Victoria, Australia
- Party: Labor
- Occupation: Public servant

Annette Louise Ellis (born 13 October 1946) is an Australian politician who was a Labor Party member of the Australian House of Representatives from the Australian Capital Territory, from March 1996 to July 2010, representing the Division of Namadgi 1996–98 and the Division of Canberra 1998–2010.

In the 1996 federal election she contested the newly created seat of Namadgi against the Liberal Member for Canberra, Brendan Smyth. Notionally, the seat was very safe for Labor; as originally drawn it had a notional Labor majority of 10.9 percent. However, due to the heavy swing nationwide against the Keating government, Ellis was only assured of victory when she received a large flow of Green preferences on the third count. Ellis become one of the few Labor candidates to defeat a Liberal during the landslide election that brought the Howard government to power. Namadgi was abolished after only one cycle, and most of its territory was merged back into Canberra. Ellis transferred to Canberra, and won it easily. She continued to hold it with little difficulty until her retirement prior to the 2010 federal election.

Ellis was born in Melbourne, Victoria, and was a public servant, electorate adviser and ministerial adviser before entering politics. She was a member of the Australian Capital Territory Legislative Assembly from 1992 to 1995.

In Federal Parliament Ellis was a member of the Opposition Shadow Ministry between 2001 and 2004. She served as Shadow Minister for Ageing and Seniors and Shadow Minister for Disabilities until the 2004 election, after which she retired from the shadow ministry.

She was re-elected in November 2007—with an increased majority—in the election that returned Labor to power federally under new Prime Minister Kevin Rudd.

She is a leading member of the ACT right wing Labor caucus, Centre Coalition.

Parliament of Australia
New division	Member for Namadgi; 1996–1998	Division abolished
Preceded by Bob McMullan	Member for Canberra; 1998–2010	Succeeded by Gai Brodtmann
