= Division of Canberra =

Australian federal electoral division

Coordinates: 35.2970°S 149.1372°E

Canberra Australian House of Representatives Division
- Interactive map of boundaries since the 2019 federal election
- Created: 1974
- MP: Alicia Payne
- Party: Labor
- Namesake: Canberra
- Electors: 102,980 (2025)
- Area: 312 km^{2} (120.5 sq mi)
- Demographic: Inner metropolitan
- Territory electorates: Ginninderra; Kurrajong; Murrumbidgee; Yerrabi
Electorates around Canberra:
Fenner	Fenner	Eden-Monaro (NSW)
Bean	Canberra	Eden-Monaro (NSW)
Bean	Bean	Eden-Monaro (NSW)

The Division of Canberra is an Australian electoral division in the Australian Capital Territory. It is named for the city of Canberra, Australia's national capital, and includes all of central Canberra, Kowen, Majura, as well as part of Weston Creek, Woden Valley, Molonglo Valley, Belconnen, and Jerrabomberra. Canberra's Parliament House, the meeting place of the Parliament of Australia, is located within the division. It is currently held by Alicia Payne of the Labor Party.

== Geography ==
Since 1984, federal electoral division boundaries in Australia have been determined at redistributions by a redistribution committee appointed by the Australian Electoral Commission. Redistributions occur for the boundaries of divisions in a particular state or territory, and they occur every seven years, or sooner if a state or territory's representation entitlement changes or when divisions of a state or territory are malapportioned.

As of 2018, the division of Canberra includes Canberra Central, the Woden Valley suburbs of Curtin, Chifley, Garran and Hughes, the Belconnen suburbs of Aranda, Bruce, Cook, Giralang, Hawker, Kaleen, Lawson and Weetangera, the Jerrabomberra suburbs of Beard and Oaks Estate and the districts of Majura and Kowen.

== History ==
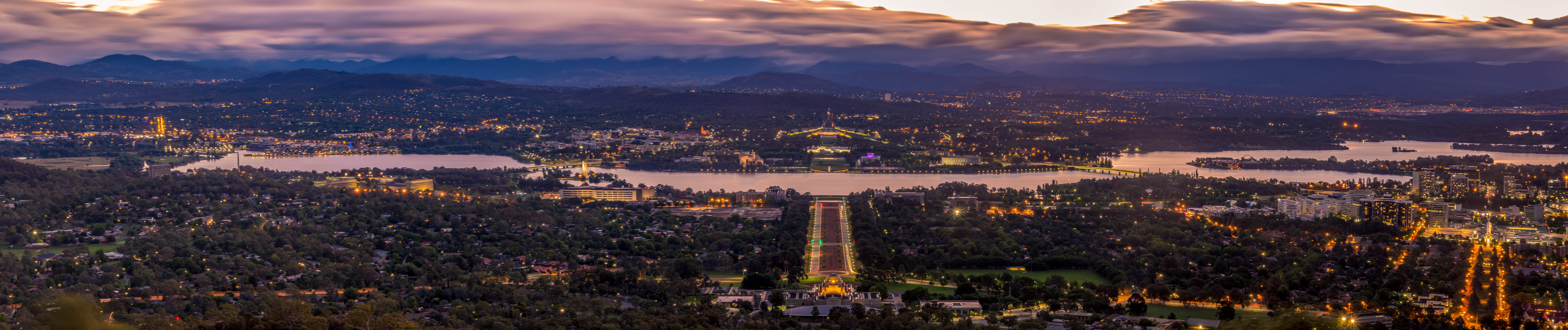
The city of Canberra, the division's namesake

The division was created in a redistribution of the former Division of Australian Capital Territory, gazetted on 19 April 1974. It originally encompassed the southern suburbs of Canberra, including the districts of Tuggeranong, Weston Creek and Woden Valley. It also generally included the land in the ACT south of the Molonglo River and Lake Burley Griffin, although at one time some suburbs in the inner south of the lake were includes in the now abolished division of Fraser. Later the division included Reid and Campbell and prior to the 2018 redistribution, it included Civic, Acton, Turner south of Haig Park and east of Sullivans Creek, Braddon south of Haig Park, Reid, Campbell and Pialligo. From 2016, the division included Norfolk Island.

In 2018, the Australian Electoral Commission announced substantial alterations to the boundaries of the electorate, due to the creation of a new seat (the Division of Bean) covering the majority of the Australian Capital Territory, centred on its south, as well as Norfolk Island. The new Division of Canberra only covers Canberra's inner suburbs, Majura and Kowen in the Territory's north-east, the Belconnen suburbs of Aranda, Bruce, Cook, Giralang, Hawker, Kaleen, Lawson and Weetangera, and parts of Woden Valley north of Hindmarsh Drive.

For most of its history it has been a fairly safe seat for the Australian Labor Party, but it has been won by the Liberal Party three times, most recently at a 1995 by-election. In recent elections, the Australian Greens vote has increased steadily, with the party being only just under 4,000 votes of surpassing the Liberal Party on primary vote to enter the two-party preferred vote. In particular, the Greens came second on primary vote in 12 booths at the 2019 federal election, and won in two booths (Dickson East and Canberra City). However, the Labor Party retains a vote almost double that of the Greens in the electorate.

== Members ==
Image	Member	Party	Term	Notes
	Kep Enderby (1926–2015)	Labor	18 May 1974 – 13 December 1975	Previously held the Division of Australian Capital Territory. Served as minister under Whitlam. Lost seat
	John Haslem (1939–)	Liberal	13 December 1975 – 18 October 1980	Lost seat
	Ros Kelly (1948–)	Labor	18 October 1980 – 30 January 1995	Previously held the Australian Capital Territory House of Assembly seat of Canberra. Served as minister under Hawke and Keating. Resigned to retire from politics
	Brendan Smyth (1959–)	Liberal	25 March 1995 – 2 March 1996	Did not contest in 1996. Failed to win the Division of Namadgi. Later elected to the Australian Capital Territory Legislative Assembly seat of Brindabella in 1998
	Bob McMullan (1947–)	Labor	2 March 1996 – 3 October 1998	Previously a member of the Senate. Transferred to the Division of Fraser
	Annette Ellis (1946–)	Labor	3 October 1998 – 19 July 2010	Previously held the Division of Namadgi. Retired
	Gai Brodtmann (1963–)	Labor	21 August 2010 – 11 April 2019	Retired
	Alicia Payne (1982–)	Labor	18 May 2019 – present	Incumbent

== Election results ==
2025 Australian federal election: Canberra
Party	Candidate	Votes	%	±%
Labor	Alicia Payne	45,133	48.32	+3.44
Greens	Isabel Mudford	18,504	19.81	−4.88
Liberal	Will Roche	17,101	18.31	−3.46
Independent	Claire Miles	10,187	10.91	+10.91
Animal Justice	Teresa McTaggart	1,258	1.35	+1.35
HEART	Mary-Jane Liddicoat	1,222	1.31	+1.31
Total formal votes		93,405	97.88	−0.35
Informal votes		2,021	2.12	+0.35
Turnout		95,426	92.70	+0.62
Notional two-party-preferred count
Labor	Alicia Payne	71,378	76.42	+3.96
Liberal	Will Roche	22,027	23.58	−3.96
Two-candidate-preferred result
Labor	Alicia Payne	64,936	69.52	+7.32
Greens	Isabel Mudford	28,469	30.48	−7.32
Labor hold		Swing	+7.32	
