= Members of the Australian House of Representatives, 1996–1998 =

This is a list of members of the Australian House of Representatives from 1996 to 1998, as elected at the 1996 federal election.

Member	Party	Electorate	State	Term in office
Tony Abbott	Liberal	Warringah	NSW	1994–2019
Dick Adams	Labor	Lyons	Tas	1993–2013
Anthony Albanese	Labor	Grayndler	NSW	1996–present
John Anderson	National	Gwydir	NSW	1989–2007
Peter Andren	Independent	Calare	NSW	1996–2007
Neil Andrew	Liberal	Wakefield	SA	1983–2004
Kevin Andrews	Liberal	Menzies	Vic	1991–2022
Larry Anthony	National	Richmond	NSW	1996–2004
Fran Bailey	Liberal	McEwen	Vic	1990–1993, 1996–2010
Bob Baldwin	Liberal	Paterson	NSW	1996–1998, 2001–2016
Peter Baldwin	Labor	Sydney	NSW	1983–1998
Phil Barresi	Liberal	Deakin	Vic	1996–2007
Kerry Bartlett	Liberal	Macquarie	NSW	1996–2007
Kim Beazley	Labor	Brand	WA	1980–2007
David Beddall	Labor	Rankin	Qld	1983–1998
Arch Bevis	Labor	Brisbane	Qld	1990–2010
Bruce Billson	Liberal	Dunkley	Vic	1996–2016
Bronwyn Bishop	Liberal	Mackellar	NSW	1994–2016
John Bradford ^{[5]}	Liberal/CDP	McPherson	Qld	1990–1998
Laurie Brereton	Labor	Kingsford Smith	NSW	1990–2004
Russell Broadbent	Liberal	McMillan	Vic	1990–1993, 1996–1998; 2004–2025
Mal Brough	Liberal	Longman	Qld	1996–2007, 2013–2016
Bob Brown	Labor	Charlton	NSW	1980–1998
Alan Cadman	Liberal	Mitchell	NSW	1974–2007
Eoin Cameron	Liberal	Stirling	WA	1993–1998
Ross Cameron	Liberal	Parramatta	NSW	1996–2004
Graeme Campbell	Independent	Kalgoorlie	WA	1980–1998
Ian Causley	National	Page	NSW	1996–2007
Bob Charles	Liberal	La Trobe	Vic	1990–2004
Michael Cobb	National	Parkes	NSW	1984–1998
Peter Costello	Liberal	Higgins	Vic	1990–2009
Simon Crean	Labor	Hotham	Vic	1990–2013
Janice Crosio	Labor	Prospect	NSW	1990–2004
Steve Dargavel^{[3]}	Labor	Fraser	ACT	1997–1998
Nick Dondas	Country Liberal	Northern Territory	NT	1996–1998
Alexander Downer	Liberal	Mayo	SA	1984–2008
Trish Draper	Liberal	Makin	SA	1996–2007
Annette Ellis	Labor	Namadgi	ACT	1996–2010
Kay Elson	Liberal	Forde	Qld	1996–2007
Warren Entsch	Liberal	Leichhardt	Qld	1996–2007, 2010–2025
Gareth Evans	Labor	Holt	Vic	1996–1999
Martyn Evans	Labor	Bonython	SA	1994–2004
Richard Evans	Liberal	Cowan	WA	1993–1998
John Fahey	Liberal	Macarthur	NSW	1996–2001
Laurie Ferguson	Labor	Reid	NSW	1990–2016
Martin Ferguson	Labor	Batman	Vic	1996–2013
Paul Filing	Independent	Moore	WA	1990–1998
Tim Fischer	National	Farrer	NSW	1984–2001
Joel Fitzgibbon	Labor	Hunter	NSW	1996–2022
John Forrest	National	Mallee	Vic	1993–2013
Chris Gallus	Liberal	Hindmarsh	SA	1990–2004
Teresa Gambaro	Liberal	Petrie	Qld	1996–2007, 2010–2016
Joanna Gash	Liberal	Gilmore	NSW	1996–2013
Petro Georgiou	Liberal	Kooyong	Vic	1994–2010
Ted Grace	Labor	Fowler	NSW	1984–1998
Elizabeth Grace	Liberal	Lilley	Qld	1996–1998
Alan Griffin	Labor	Bruce	Vic	1993–2016
Bob Halverson	Liberal	Casey	Vic	1984–1998
Pauline Hanson ^{[4]}	Independent/ONP	Oxley	Qld	1996–1998
Gary Hardgrave	Liberal	Moreton	Qld	1996–2007
Michael Hatton ^{[1]}	Labor	Blaxland	NSW	1996–2007
David Hawker	Liberal	Wannon	Vic	1983–2010
Noel Hicks	National	Riverina	NSW	1980–1998
Joe Hockey	Liberal	North Sydney	NSW	1996–2015
Clyde Holding	Labor	Melbourne Ports	Vic	1977–1998
Colin Hollis	Labor	Throsby	NSW	1984–2001
John Howard	Liberal	Bennelong	NSW	1974–2007
Susan Jeanes	Liberal	Kingston	SA	1996–1998
Harry Jenkins	Labor	Scullin	Vic	1986–2013
Ricky Johnston	Liberal	Canning	WA	1996–1998
Barry Jones	Labor	Lalor	Vic	1977–1998
David Jull	Liberal	Fadden	Qld	1975–1983, 1984–2007
Bob Katter	National	Kennedy	Qld	1993–present
Paul Keating ^{[1]}	Labor	Blaxland	NSW	1969–1996
De-Anne Kelly	National	Dawson	Qld	1996–2007
Jackie Kelly^{[2]}	Liberal	Lindsay	NSW	1996–2007
David Kemp	Liberal	Goldstein	Vic	1990–2004
Duncan Kerr	Labor	Denison	Tas	1987–2010
John Langmore^{[3]}	Labor	Fraser	ACT	1984–1997
Mark Latham	Labor	Werriwa	NSW	1994–2005
Carmen Lawrence	Labor	Fremantle	WA	1994–2007
Michael Lee	Labor	Dobell	NSW	1984–2001
Lou Lieberman	Liberal	Indi	Vic	1993–2001
Peter Lindsay	Liberal	Herbert	Qld	1996–2010
Jim Lloyd	Liberal	Robertson	NSW	1996–2007
Stewart McArthur	Liberal	Corangamite	Vic	1984–2007
Robert McClelland	Labor	Barton	NSW	1996–2013
Graeme McDougall	Liberal	Griffith	Qld	1996–1998
Peter McGauran	National	Gippsland	Vic	1983–2008
Ian McLachlan	Liberal	Barker	SA	1990–1998
Leo McLeay	Labor	Watson	NSW	1979–2004
Bob McMullan	Labor	Canberra	ACT	1996–2010
Jenny Macklin	Labor	Jagajaga	Vic	1996–2019
Paul Marek	National	Capricornia	Qld	1996–1998
Stephen Martin	Labor	Cunningham	NSW	1984–2002
Daryl Melham	Labor	Banks	NSW	1990–2013
Chris Miles	Liberal	Braddon	Tas	1984–1998
John Moore	Liberal	Ryan	Qld	1975–2001
Allan Morris	Labor	Newcastle	NSW	1983–2001
Peter Morris	Labor	Shortland	NSW	1972–1998
Frank Mossfield	Labor	Greenway	NSW	1996–2004
Judi Moylan	Liberal	Pearce	WA	1993–2013
Stephen Mutch	Liberal	Cook	NSW	1996–1998
Gary Nairn	Liberal	Eden-Monaro	NSW	1996–2007
Garry Nehl	National	Cowper	NSW	1984–2001
Brendan Nelson	Liberal	Bradfield	NSW	1996–2009
Paul Neville	National	Hinkler	Qld	1993–2013
Peter Nugent	Liberal	Aston	Vic	1990–2001
Gavan O'Connor	Labor	Corio	Vic	1993–2007
Neil O'Keefe	Labor	Burke	Vic	1984–2001
Roger Price	Labor	Chifley	NSW	1984–2010
Geoff Prosser	Liberal	Forrest	WA	1987–2007
Christopher Pyne	Liberal	Sturt	SA	1993–2019
Harry Quick	Labor	Franklin	Tas	1993–2007
Don Randall	Liberal	Swan	WA	1996–1998, 2001–2015
Bruce Reid	Liberal	Bendigo	Vic	1990–1998
Peter Reith	Liberal	Flinders	Vic	1982–1983, 1984–2001
Allan Rocher	Independent	Curtin	WA	1981–1998
Michael Ronaldson	Liberal	Ballarat	Vic	1990–2001
Philip Ruddock	Liberal	Berowra	NSW	1973–2016
Rod Sawford	Labor	Port Adelaide	SA	1988–2007
Bruce Scott	National	Maranoa	Qld	1990–2016
Bob Sercombe	Labor	Maribyrnong	Vic	1996–2007
John Sharp	National	Hume	NSW	1984–1998
Ian Sinclair	National	New England	NSW	1963–1998
Peter Slipper	Liberal	Fisher	Qld	1984–1987, 1993–2013
Tony Smith	Liberal/Independent ^{[7]}	Dickson	Qld	1996–1998
Stephen Smith	Labor	Perth	WA	1993–2013
Warwick Smith	Liberal	Bass	Tas	1984–1993, 1996–1998
Alex Somlyay	Liberal	Fairfax	Qld	1990–2013
Andrew Southcott	Liberal	Boothby	SA	1996–2016
Sharman Stone	Liberal	Murray	Vic	1996–2016
Kathy Sullivan	Liberal	Moncrieff	Qld	1984–2001
Lindsay Tanner	Labor	Melbourne	Vic	1993–2010
Bill Taylor	Liberal	Groom	Qld	1988–1998
Andrew Theophanous	Labor	Calwell	Vic	1980–2001
Andrew Thomson	Liberal	Wentworth	NSW	1995–2001
Kelvin Thomson	Labor	Wills	Vic	1996–2016
Warren Truss	National	Wide Bay	Qld	1990–2016
Wilson Tuckey	Liberal	O'Connor	WA	1980–2010
Mark Vaile	National	Lyne	NSW	1993–2008
Danna Vale	Liberal	Hughes	NSW	1996–2010
Barry Wakelin	Liberal	Grey	SA	1993–2007
Andrea West	Liberal	Bowman	Qld	1996–1998
Daryl Williams	Liberal	Tangney	WA	1993–2004
Ralph Willis	Labor	Gellibrand	Vic	1972–1998
Greg Wilton	Labor	Isaacs	Vic	1996–2000
Michael Wooldridge	Liberal	Chisholm	Vic	1987–2001
Trish Worth	Liberal	Adelaide	SA	1993–2004
Paul Zammit	Liberal/Independent ^{[6]}	Lowe	NSW	1996–1998

^{1} The Labor member for Blaxland, Paul Keating resigned before the swearing in of parliament, after losing the election and thus, the position of Prime Minister. The resulting by-election held on 15 June 1996 was won by Labor's Michael Hatton.
^{2} The election of Jackie Kelly in Lindsay was declared invalid by the High Court of Australia, but she was subsequently re-elected in a by-election on 19 October 1996.
^{3} Labor member John Langmore, member for Fraser, resigned. At the resulting by-election on 1 February 1997, Labor candidate Steve Dargavel was elected.
^{4} Pauline Hanson, the member for Oxley, was elected as a Liberal, though she had been disendorsed during the campaign. She subsequently sat in Parliament as an independent, until forming her own party, One Nation, later in her term.
^{5} John Bradford, member for the Gold Coast seat of McPherson, resigned from the Liberal Party in 1998 and joined the Christian Democratic Party, serving as their only representative in the parliament. He was defeated at the subsequent general election.
^{6} Paul Zammit, member for the inner western Sydney seat of Lowe, resigned from the Liberal Party in 1998 over a dispute about Sydney Airport. He served the remainder of his term as an independent.
^{7} Tony Smith, the member for Dickson, resigned from the Liberal Party in 1998 and sat as an independent.
