= Electoral results for the Division of Fraser (Australian Capital Territory) =

Australian division election results

This is a list of electoral results for the Division of Fraser (Australian Capital Territory) in Australian federal elections from the division's creation in 1974 until its abolition in 2016.

== Members ==
Member	Party	Term
Ken Fry	Labor	1974–1984
John Langmore	Labor	1984–1996
Steve Dargavel	Labor	1997–1998
Bob McMullan	Labor	1998–2010
Andrew Leigh	Labor	2010–2016

== Election results ==
=== Elections in the 2010s ===
==== 2013 ====
2013 Australian federal election: Fraser
Party	Candidate	Votes	%	±%
Labor	Andrew Leigh	56,063	44.66	−1.15
Liberal	Elizabeth Lee	39,693	31.62	−0.79
Greens	Adam Verwey	17,665	14.07	−5.77
Bullet Train	Sam Huggins	5,099	4.06	+4.06
Palmer United	Freddy Alcazar	3,063	2.44	+2.44
Democrats	Darren Churchill	2,444	1.95	+1.95
Rise Up Australia	Jill Ross	1,508	1.20	+1.20
Total formal votes		125,535	96.27	+0.70
Informal votes		4,859	3.73	−0.70
Turnout		130,394	94.46	+0.07
Two-party-preferred result
Labor	Andrew Leigh	78,614	62.62	−1.58
Liberal	Elizabeth Lee	46,921	37.38	+1.58
Labor hold		Swing	−1.58	

==== 2010 ====
2010 Australian federal election: Fraser
Party	Candidate	Votes	%	±%
Labor	Andrew Leigh	51,092	45.81	−5.29
Liberal	James Milligan	36,148	32.41	+1.18
Greens	Indra Esguerra	22,126	19.84	+6.46
Secular	Quintin Hedges-Phillips	2,175	1.95	+1.95
Total formal votes		111,541	95.57	−2.07
Informal votes		5,171	4.43	+2.07
Turnout		116,712	94.55	−1.12
Two-party-preferred result
Labor	Andrew Leigh	71,613	64.20	−0.87
Liberal	James Milligan	39,928	35.80	+0.87
Labor hold		Swing	−0.87	

=== Elections in the 2000s ===
==== 2007 ====
2007 Australian federal election: Fraser
Party	Candidate	Votes	%	±%
Labor	Bob McMullan	55,533	51.10	+0.50
Liberal	Troy Williams	33,936	31.23	−2.41
Greens	Meredith Hunter	14,546	13.38	+2.12
Democrats	Darren Churchill	2,509	2.31	−0.27
Independent	Kerri Taranto	1,275	1.17	+1.17
Socialist Alliance	Farida Iqbal	539	0.50	−1.42
Citizens Electoral Council	Jim Arnold	342	0.31	+0.31
Total formal votes		108,680	97.64	+1.15
Informal votes		2,629	2.36	−1.15
Turnout		111,309	95.67	+0.92
Two-party-preferred result
Labor	Bob McMullan	70,715	65.07	+1.75
Liberal	Troy Williams	37,965	34.93	−1.75
Labor hold		Swing	+1.75	

==== 2004 ====
2004 Australian federal election: Fraser
Party	Candidate	Votes	%	±%
Labor	Bob McMullan	54,622	50.60	+3.13
Liberal	Adam Giles	36,270	33.60	+2.82
Greens	David Turbayne	12,197	11.30	+3.42
Democrats	Lynne Grimsey	2,792	2.59	−5.39
Socialist Alliance	James Vassilopoulos	2,067	1.91	+1.91
Total formal votes		107,948	96.52	+0.14
Informal votes		3,887	3.48	−0.14
Turnout		111,835	94.72	+0.11
Two-party-preferred result
Labor	Bob McMullan	68,359	63.33	+0.64
Liberal	Adam Giles	39,589	36.67	−0.64
Labor hold		Swing	+0.64	

==== 2001 ====
2001 Australian federal election: Fraser
Party	Candidate	Votes	%	±%
Labor	Bob McMullan	48,583	47.47	−4.94
Liberal	Martin Dunn	31,503	30.78	+2.71
Democrats	Fleur Wimborne	8,168	7.98	+0.56
Greens	Ben O'Callaghan	8,067	7.88	+3.35
One Nation	Paul Kemp	2,397	2.34	−2.60
Christian Democrats	Caroline O'Sullivan	2,251	2.20	+2.20
	James Vassilopoulos	1,369	1.34	+1.34
Total formal votes		102,338	96.58	−0.72
Informal votes		3,844	3.62	+0.72
Turnout		106,182	95.19	
Two-party-preferred result
Labor	Bob McMullan	64,154	62.69	−2.17
Liberal	Martin Dunn	38,184	37.31	+2.17
Labor hold		Swing	−2.17	

=== Elections in the 1990s ===
==== 1998 ====
1998 Australian federal election: Fraser
Party	Candidate	Votes	%	±%
Labor	Bob McMullan	50,573	52.41	+1.89
Liberal	Peter Smith	27,088	28.07	−9.72
Democrats	Jason Wood	7,157	7.42	+7.42
One Nation	Chris Spence	4,773	4.95	+4.95
Greens	Gordon McAllister	4,371	4.53	−5.45
Democratic Socialist	Sue Bull	1,214	1.26	+1.26
Independent	Joanne Clark	1,057	1.10	+1.10
Natural Law	David Seaton	258	0.27	−0.16
Total formal votes		96,491	97.10	+0.32
Informal votes		2,883	2.90	−0.32
Turnout		99,374	95.39	−1.45
Two-party-preferred result
Labor	Bob McMullan	62,580	64.86	+6.00
Liberal	Peter Smith	33,911	35.14	−6.00
Labor hold		Swing	+6.00	

==== 1997 by-election ====
1997 Fraser by-election
Party	Candidate	Votes	%	±%
Labor	Steve Dargavel	25,867	49.10	−1.41
Independent	Cheryl Hill	9,642	18.30	+18.30
Greens	Dierk von Behrens	5,584	10.60	+0.70
Independent	Alice Chu	4,135	7.85	+7.85
AAFI	Angela Walker	1,870	3.55	+3.55
Call to Australia	John Richard Miller	1,766	3.35	+3.35
Independent	Douglas S. Thompson	1,456	2.76	+2.76
Reclaim Australia	John Hutchinson	1,228	2.33	+2.33
Advance Australia	Kevin Connor	490	0.93	+0.93
Independent	Joanne Clarke	455	0.86	+0.86
Independent	Jim Bernard	189	0.36	+0.36
Total formal votes		52,682	94.08	−2.66
Informal votes		3,313	5.92	+2.66
Turnout		55,995	85.25	−11.59
Two-candidate-preferred result
Labor	Steve Dargavel	34,370	65.24	+7.92
Independent	Cheryl Hill	18,312	34.76	+34.76
Labor hold		Swing	N/A	

==== 1996 ====
1996 Australian federal election: Fraser
Party	Candidate	Votes	%	±%
Labor	John Langmore	30,459	50.51	−3.77
Liberal	Cheryl Hill	23,877	39.59	+7.15
Greens	Miko Kirschbaum	5,970	9.90	+9.90
Total formal votes		60,306	96.74	+0.55
Informal votes		2,032	3.26	−0.55
Turnout		62,338	96.84	+0.32
Two-party-preferred result
Labor	John Langmore	34,443	57.32	−4.74
Liberal	Cheryl Hill	25,647	42.68	+4.74
Labor hold		Swing	−4.74	

==== 1993 ====
1993 Australian federal election: Fraser
Party	Candidate	Votes	%	±%
Labor	John Langmore	49,098	54.42	+8.52
Liberal	Martin Dunn	29,031	32.18	+0.64
Democrats	Greg Kramer	5,559	6.16	−9.75
Independent	David Eastman	2,070	2.29	+2.29
	Sue Bolton	2,023	2.24	+2.24
Independent	Emile Brunoro	672	0.74	−0.37
Independent	Kev Wise	657	0.73	+0.73
Natural Law	Andrew Gordon	654	0.72	+0.72
Independent	Peter Joseph	463	0.51	+0.51
Total formal votes		90,227	96.16	−0.56
Informal votes		3,600	3.84	+0.56
Turnout		90,227	96.52	
Two-party-preferred result
Labor	John Langmore	56,623	62.81	+1.78
Liberal	Martin Dunn	33,521	37.19	−1.78
Labor hold		Swing	+1.78	

==== 1990 ====
1990 Australian federal election: Fraser
Party	Candidate	Votes	%	±%
Labor	John Langmore	36,544	46.0	−8.0
Liberal	Sandie Brooke	24,746	31.1	+2.2
Democrats	Heather Jeffcoat	12,876	16.2	+9.0
Green Democratic	Sue Bolton	3,213	4.0	+4.0
Nuclear Disarmament	Gareth Smith	1,185	1.5	−3.6
Independent	Emile Brunoro	949	1.2	+0.6
Total formal votes		79,513	96.7	
Informal votes		2,680	3.3	
Turnout		82,193	95.6	
Two-party-preferred result
Labor	John Langmore	48,626	61.3	−3.2
Liberal	Sandie Brooke	30,677	38.7	+3.2
Labor hold		Swing	−3.2	

=== Elections in the 1980s ===
==== 1987 ====
1987 Australian federal election: Fraser
Party	Candidate	Votes	%	±%
Labor	John Langmore	40,616	54.0	−1.0
Liberal	Ian Farrow	21,767	28.9	−2.2
Democrats	Peter Hayes	5,412	7.2	−1.6
Nuclear Disarmament	Gareth Smith	3,852	5.1	+5.1
Family Movement	Dawn Casley-Smith	2,050	2.7	+2.7
Independent	Larry O'Sullivan	539	0.7	+0.7
Independent	Kevin Wise	536	0.7	+0.2
Independent	Emile Brunoro	473	0.6	−0.5
Total formal votes		75,245	96.2	
Informal votes		2,988	3.8	
Turnout		78,233	93.0	
Two-party-preferred result
Labor	John Langmore	48,505	64.5	+2.2
Liberal	Ian Farrow	26,718	35.5	−2.2
Labor hold		Swing	+2.2	

==== 1984 ====
1984 Australian federal election: Fraser
Party	Candidate	Votes	%	±%
Labor	John Langmore	38,183	55.0	−10.0
Liberal	John McLaren	21,558	31.1	+0.9
Democrats	Andrew Freeman	6,138	8.8	+8.8
Deadly Serious	Rozalyn Daniell	2,102	3.0	+0.5
Independent	Emile Brunoro	737	1.1	+1.1
Independent	Kevin Wise	353	0.5	−1.7
Independent	Arthur Burns	345	0.5	+0.5
Total formal votes		69,416	94.1	
Informal votes		4,375	5.9	
Turnout		73,791	94.0	
Two-party-preferred result
Labor	John Langmore	43,261	62.3	−5.1
Liberal	John McLaren	26,143	37.7	+5.1
Labor hold		Swing	−5.1	

==== 1983 ====
1983 Australian federal election: Fraser
Party	Candidate	Votes	%	±%
Labor	Ken Fry	41,755	65.6	+8.3
Liberal	Liz Grant	18,848	29.6	−5.0
Deadly Serious	Rohan Greenland	1,619	2.5	+2.5
Independent	Kevin Wise	1,419	2.2	+1.2
Total formal votes		63,641	97.6	
Informal votes		1,572	2.4	
Turnout		65,213	95.3	
Two-party-preferred result
Labor	Ken Fry		68.0	+5.5
Liberal	Liz Grant		32.0	−5.5
Labor hold		Swing	+5.5	

==== 1980 ====
1980 Australian federal election: Fraser
Party	Candidate	Votes	%	±%
Labor	Ken Fry	36,564	57.3	−2.1
Liberal	Michael Yabsley	22,059	34.6	−6.0
Democrats	Dimmen de Graaff	4,156	6.5	+6.5
Independent	Kevin Wise	636	1.0	+1.0
Independent	Basil Yakimov	367	0.6	+0.6
Total formal votes		63,782	97.6	
Informal votes		1,537	2.4	
Turnout		65,319	93.8	
Two-party-preferred result
Labor	Ken Fry		62.5	+3.1
Liberal	Michael Yabsley		37.5	−3.1
Labor hold		Swing	+3.1	

=== Elections in the 1970s ===
==== 1977 ====
1977 Australian federal election: Fraser
Party	Candidate	Votes	%	±%
Labor	Ken Fry	34,609	59.4	+8.3
Liberal	George Mailath	23,612	40.6	−4.7
Total formal votes		58,221	97.5	
Informal votes		1,522	2.5	
Turnout		59,743	92.0	
Labor hold		Swing	+7.4	

==== 1975 ====
1975 Australian federal election: Fraser
Party	Candidate	Votes	%	±%
Labor	Ken Fry	28,227	51.1	−6.2
Liberal	George Mailath	25,030	45.3	+10.3
Liberal Movement	Claude Hammond	1,944	3.5	+3.5
Total formal votes		55,201	98.3	
Informal votes		969	1.7	
Turnout		56,170	94.2	
Two-party-preferred result
Labor	Ken Fry		52.0	−8.7
Liberal	George Mailath		48.0	+8.7
Labor hold		Swing	−8.7	

==== 1974 ====
1974 Australian federal election: Fraser
Party	Candidate	Votes	%	±%
Labor	Ken Fry	27,294	57.3	+5.2
Liberal	Larry Pickering	16,662	35.0	+12.2
Australia	John Filler	1,610	3.4	−10.3
Country	Stephen Lamb	1,429	3.0	+3.0
Independent	Anthony Emerson-Elliott	393	0.8	+0.8
Independent	Kevin Wise	279	0.6	+0.6
Total formal votes		47,667	98.5	
Informal votes		741	1.5	
Turnout		48,408	91.9	
Two-party-preferred result
Labor	Ken Fry		60.7	−4.8
Liberal	Larry Pickering		39.3	+4.8
Labor notional hold		Swing	−4.8	
