= Electoral results for the Division of Blaxland =

Australian division election results

This is a list of electoral results for the Division of Blaxland in Australian federal elections since the electorate's creation in 1949 until the present.

== Members ==
Member	Party	Term
Eli Harrison	Labor	1949–1969
Paul Keating	Labor	1969–1996
Michael Hatton	Labor	1996–2007
Jason Clare	Labor	2007–present

== Election results ==
=== Elections in the 2020s ===
==== 2025 ====
2025 Australian federal election: Blaxland
Party	Candidate	Votes	%	±%
Labor	Jason Clare	40,001	46.04	−5.52
Liberal	Courtney Nguyen	17,023	19.59	−7.58
Independent	Ahmed Ouf	16,302	18.76	+18.76
Greens	Omar Sakr	6,854	7.89	+1.07
One Nation	Mitchell Klievens	3,086	3.55	−0.90
Libertarian	Mike Luo	1,894	2.18	+1.08
Family First	Jennifer Di Girolamo	1,726	1.99	+1.99
Total formal votes		86,886	87.14	−1.32
Informal votes		12,822	12.86	+1.32
Turnout		99,708	85.43	+3.41
Two-party-preferred result
Labor	Jason Clare	62,474	71.90	+8.86
Liberal	Courtney Nguyen	24,412	28.10	−8.86
Labor hold		Swing	+8.86	

==== 2022 ====
2022 Australian federal election: Blaxland
Party	Candidate	Votes	%	±%
Labor	Jason Clare	44,905	54.98	−2.80
Liberal	Oz Guney	22,059	27.01	−1.81
Greens	Linda Eisler	5,187	6.35	+0.99
United Australia	Elvis Sinosic	5,105	6.25	+3.37
One Nation	Adam Stepanoff	4,421	5.41	+5.41
Total formal votes		81,677	89.21	+2.51
Informal votes		9,884	10.79	−2.51
Turnout		91,561	85.37	−3.08
Two-party-preferred result
Labor	Jason Clare	53,039	64.94	+0.22
Liberal	Oz Guney	28,638	35.06	−0.22
Labor hold		Swing	+0.22	

Alluvial diagram for preference flows in the seat of Blaxland in the 2022 federal election. The winning candidate got over 50% of first preference votes, so this alluvial diagram is indicative only, and preference flows were not used to determine the final result. The preference flows were used to determine the two-candidate-preferred.

=== Elections in the 2010s ===
==== 2019 ====
2019 Australian federal election: Blaxland
Party	Candidate	Votes	%	±%
Labor	Jason Clare	46,689	57.78	−5.53
Liberal	Oz Guney	23,289	28.82	+4.00
Greens	James Rooney	4,329	5.36	+0.73
Christian Democrats	Veronica Rowe	4,173	5.16	−0.86
United Australia	Nadeem Ashraf	2,328	2.88	+2.88
Total formal votes		80,808	86.70	−1.75
Informal votes		12,401	13.30	+1.75
Turnout		93,209	88.45	+1.20
Two-party-preferred result
Labor	Jason Clare	52,299	64.72	−4.76
Liberal	Oz Guney	28,509	35.28	+4.76
Labor hold		Swing	−4.76	

==== 2016 ====
2016 Australian federal election: Blaxland
Party	Candidate	Votes	%	±%
Labor	Jason Clare	50,572	63.31	+8.07
Liberal	Felicity Findlay	19,825	24.82	−8.49
Christian Democrats	Clint Nasr	4,810	6.02	+3.91
Greens	Suzan Virago	3,698	4.63	+1.34
Socialist Equality	Gabriela Zabala	980	1.23	+1.23
Total formal votes		79,885	88.45	+1.81
Informal votes		10,429	11.55	−1.81
Turnout		90,314	87.25	−3.20
Two-party-preferred result
Labor	Jason Clare	55,507	69.48	+8.24
Liberal	Felicity Findlay	24,378	30.52	−8.24
Labor hold		Swing	+8.24	

==== 2013 ====
2013 Australian federal election: Blaxland
Party	Candidate	Votes	%	±%
Labor	Jason Clare	43,568	55.73	+4.75
Liberal	Anthony Khouri	25,579	32.72	−0.58
Greens	John Ky	2,416	3.09	−3.17
Palmer United	Zali Burrows	2,119	2.71	+2.71
Katter's Australian	Nafez Taleb	1,921	2.46	+2.46
Christian Democrats	Juliat Nasr	1,757	2.25	+2.25
Democratic Labour	Boutros Zalloua	817	1.05	+1.05
Total formal votes		78,177	86.33	+0.39
Informal votes		12,380	13.67	−0.39
Turnout		90,557	90.30	+0.21
Two-party-preferred result
Labor	Jason Clare	48,025	61.43	−0.80
Liberal	Anthony Khouri	30,152	38.57	+0.80
Labor hold		Swing	−0.80	

==== 2010 ====
2010 Australian federal election: Blaxland
Party	Candidate	Votes	%	±%
Labor	Jason Clare	37,641	50.98	−8.78
Liberal	Mark Majewski	24,583	33.30	+7.11
Greens	Malikeh Michels	4,625	6.26	+0.69
Independent	Abdul Charaf	2,131	2.89	+2.89
Socialist Equality	Richard Phillips	2,058	2.79	+2.79
One Nation	Bob Vinnicombe	1,351	1.83	+0.74
Independent	David Ball	1,153	1.56	+1.56
Communist League	Ronald Poulsen	288	0.39	+0.39
Total formal votes		73,830	85.94	−5.17
Informal votes		12,081	14.06	+5.17
Turnout		85,911	90.10	−2.65
Two-party-preferred result
Labor	Jason Clare	45,948	62.23	−4.42
Liberal	Mark Majewski	27,882	37.77	+4.42
Labor hold		Swing	−4.42	

=== Elections in the 2000s ===
==== 2007 ====
2007 Australian federal election: Blaxland
Party	Candidate	Votes	%	±%
Labor	Jason Clare	47,495	61.32	+5.09
Liberal	Mark Majewski	18,665	24.10	−5.34
Greens	John Ky	5,004	6.46	+1.14
Christian Democrats	Chris McLachlan	1,850	2.39	−0.14
Independent	Harry Stavrinos	1,535	1.98	+1.98
One Nation	Bob Vinnicombe	1,202	1.55	−1.86
Family First	Gabrielle Kent	1,183	1.53	+1.53
Socialist Alliance	Raul Bassi	522	0.67	+0.17
Total formal votes		77,456	90.51	+0.78
Informal votes		8,126	9.49	−0.78
Turnout		85,582	93.26	+0.12
Two-party-preferred result
Labor	Jason Clare	52,953	68.37	+3.14
Liberal	Mark Majewski	24,503	31.63	−3.14
Labor hold		Swing	+3.14	

==== 2004 ====
2004 Australian federal election: Blaxland
Party	Candidate	Votes	%	±%
Labor	Michael Hatton	37,117	53.79	−0.34
Liberal	Mark Majewski	21,407	31.02	+5.11
One Nation	Bob Vinnicombe	3,300	4.78	−1.28
Greens	Marlene Marquez-Obeid	3,205	4.64	+2.02
Christian Democrats	Matthew Squires	2,378	3.45	+1.26
Democrats	Martine Eve-Macleod	875	1.27	−3.67
Socialist Alliance	Raul Bassi	493	0.71	+0.71
Citizens Electoral Council	Terry Boath	230	0.33	+0.33
Total formal votes		69,005	89.30	−0.92
Informal votes		8,271	10.70	+0.92
Turnout		77,276	93.73	−0.17
Two-party-preferred result
Labor	Michael Hatton	43,383	62.87	−2.34
Liberal	Mark Majewski	25,622	37.13	+2.34
Labor hold		Swing	−2.34	

==== 2001 ====
2001 Australian federal election: Blaxland
Party	Candidate	Votes	%	±%
Labor	Michael Hatton	37,956	54.13	−6.40
Liberal	Les Osmond	18.170	25.91	+3.78
One Nation	Bob Vinnicombe	4,248	6.06	−0.94
Democrats	Colin McDermott	3,461	4.94	+2.53
Greens	Sonya McKay	1,839	2.62	+1.07
Christian Democrats	Janne Peterson	1,535	2.19	−0.03
Unity	Dario Hawat	1,493	2.13	−1.35
Independent	Peter Sayegh	975	1.39	+1.39
Independent	Munther Anny	443	0.63	+0.63
Total formal votes		70,120	90.22	−4.26
Informal votes		7,605	9.78	+4.26
Turnout		77,725	94.49	
Two-party-preferred result
Labor	Michael Hatton	45,725	65.21	−6.50
Liberal	Les Osmond	24,395	34.79	+6.50
Labor hold		Swing	−6.50	

=== Elections in the 1990s ===
==== 1998 ====
1998 Australian federal election: Blaxland
Party	Candidate	Votes	%	±%
Labor	Michael Hatton	44,096	61.42	+2.71
Liberal	Maureen Shelley	15,649	21.80	−9.25
One Nation	Hussein Abou-Ghaida	5,052	7.04	+7.04
Unity	Harold Hassapis	2,536	3.53	+3.53
Democrats	Matthew Hua	1,733	2.41	−1.05
Christian Democrats	Kylie Mary Laurence	1,623	2.26	+0.93
Greens	Benjamin Donnelly	1,107	1.54	+1.54
Total formal votes		71,796	94.46	+1.08
Informal votes		4,211	5.54	−1.08
Turnout		76,007	94.31	−1.75
Two-party-preferred result
Labor	Michael Hatton	51,738	72.06	+9.08
Liberal	Maureen Shelley	20,058	27.94	−9.08
Labor hold		Swing	+9.08	

==== 1996 by-election ====
1996 Blaxland by-election
Party	Candidate	Votes	%	±%
Labor	Michael Hatton	37,804	58.83	+0.12
AAFI	Peter John Krumins	8,759	13.63	+10.88
Reclaim Australia	John Hutchinson	5,771	8.98	+8.98
Greens	Vicki Kearney	3,148	4.90	+4.90
Call to Australia	Melodie Rahme	2,782	4.33	+4.16
Independent	Peter Sayegh	2,334	3.63	+2.65
Independent	Neil Baird	1,499	2.33	+2.33
Independent	Bob Reid	750	1.17	+1.17
Anti-Super League	Adam Spencer	499	0.78	+0.78
	Marnie Kennedy	388	0.60	+0.60
Independent	Marc Aussie-Stone	298	0.46	+0.11
Natural Law	Linda Cogger	224	0.35	+0.10
Total formal votes		64,256	92.66	−0.72
Informal votes		5,092	7.34	+0.72
Turnout		69,348	87.00	−9.06
Two-party-preferred result
Labor	Michael Hatton		69.06	+6.08
Reclaim Australia	John Hutchinson		30.94	+30.94
Labor hold		Swing	+6.08	

==== 1996 ====
1996 Australian federal election: Blaxland
Party	Candidate	Votes	%	±%
Labor	Paul Keating	41,444	58.71	−10.69
Liberal	Nick Korovin	21,916	31.05	+6.80
Democrats	Jeffrey Meikle	2,442	3.46	+1.47
AAFI	Michael Lavis	1,944	2.75	+2.75
Call to Australia	Melodie Rahme	936	1.33	+0.17
Independent	Peter Sayegh	695	0.98	+0.98
Independent	Eric Lawrence	526	0.75	+0.75
Independent	Marc Aussie-Stone	267	0.38	+0.09
	Nick Beams	244	0.35	+0.35
Natural Law	Peter Smith	176	0.25	−0.29
Total formal votes		70,590	93.38	−1.59
Informal votes		5,005	6.62	+1.59
Turnout		75,595	96.06	+0.55
Two-party-preferred result
Labor	Paul Keating	44,328	62.98	−9.12
Liberal	Nick Korovin	26,056	37.02	+9.12
Labor hold		Swing	−9.12	

==== 1993 ====
1993 Australian federal election: Blaxland
Party	Candidate	Votes	%	±%
Labor	Paul Keating	48,446	69.40	+13.88
Liberal	Les Osmond	16,927	24.25	−6.40
Democrats	Peter Hennessy	1,388	1.99	−6.43
Call to Australia	Trevor Carrick	804	1.15	+0.48
Independent	Jon Hillman	678	0.97	+0.97
	Linda Tenenbaum	413	0.59	+0.59
Independent	Bob Reid	388	0.56	+0.56
Natural Law	Peter O'Neill	378	0.54	+0.54
Independent	Marcus Aussie-Stone	204	0.29	+0.29
Independent	Wilfred Kelvin	179	0.26	+0.26
Total formal votes		69,805	94.97	+0.44
Informal votes		3,698	5.03	−0.44
Turnout		73,503	95.51	
Two-party-preferred result
Labor	Paul Keating	50,283	72.10	+9.10
Liberal	Les Osmond	19,461	27.90	−9.10
Labor hold		Swing	+9.10	

==== 1990 ====
1990 Australian federal election: Blaxland
Party	Candidate	Votes	%	±%
Labor	Paul Keating	33,780	55.3	+2.1
Liberal	David Voight	19,243	31.5	−2.1
Democrats	Fiona Richardson	5,382	8.8	+5.0
Independent	Mohamad Arja	1,313	2.1	+2.1
Democratic Socialist	Stephanie Miller	707	1.2	+1.2
New Australia	Michael Irsak	646	1.1	+1.1
Total formal votes		61,071	94.5	
Informal votes		3,567	5.5	
Turnout		64,638	95.0	
Two-party-preferred result
Labor	Paul Keating	37,887	62.2	+3.4
Liberal	David Voight	23,056	37.8	−3.4
Labor hold		Swing	+3.4	

=== Elections in the 1980s ===
==== 1987 ====
1987 Australian federal election: Blaxland
Party	Candidate	Votes	%	±%
Labor	Paul Keating	30,968	53.2	−8.6
Liberal	Andrew Thorn	19,573	33.6	+2.7
Independent	Philip Black	2,782	4.8	+4.8
Democrats	John Young	2,222	3.8	−3.5
Independent	Paul Keating	1,239	2.1	+2.1
Independent	Tony Leitao	759	1.3	+1.3
Independent	Frank Rayner	431	0.7	+0.7
Independent	Kaye Tucker	221	0.4	+0.4
Total formal votes		58,195	90.9	
Informal votes		5,860	9.1	
Turnout		64,055	94.0	
Two-party-preferred result
Labor	Paul Keating	34,192	58.8	−7.4
Liberal	Andrew Thorn	23,950	41.2	+7.4
Labor hold		Swing	−7.4	

==== 1984 ====
1984 Australian federal election: Blaxland
Party	Candidate	Votes	%	±%
Labor	Paul Keating	35,139	61.8	−0.9
Liberal	Bob Young	17,581	30.9	−2.0
Democrats	Samuel Adams	4,165	7.3	+3.5
Total formal votes		56,885	90.5	
Informal votes		6,006	9.5	
Turnout		62,891	94.1	
Two-party-preferred result
Labor	Paul Keating	37,646	66.2	+1.3
Liberal	Bob Young	19,197	33.8	−1.3
Labor hold		Swing	+1.3	

==== 1983 ====
1983 Australian federal election: Blaxland
Party	Candidate	Votes	%	±%
Labor	Paul Keating	41,609	62.9	+3.3
Liberal	David Brown	21,604	32.7	+1.7
Democrats	Phillip Grattan	2,504	3.8	+0.5
Socialist Workers	Siong Hoe Goh	388	0.6	−4.4
Total formal votes		66,105	96.5	
Informal votes		2,407	3.5	
Turnout		68,512	94.6	
Two-party-preferred result
Labor	Paul Keating	42,982	65.02	−2.18
Liberal	David Brown	23,123	34.98	+2.18
Labor hold		Swing	−2.18	

==== 1980 ====
1980 Australian federal election: Blaxland
Party	Candidate	Votes	%	±%
Labor	Paul Keating	38,493	59.6	+5.4
Liberal	Salvatore Napoli	20,024	31.0	−2.0
Socialist Workers	James Doughney	3,203	5.0	+5.0
Democrats	Phillip Grattan	2,103	3.3	−3.5
Socialist Labour	Craig Marley	802	1.2	+1.2
Total formal votes		64,625	96.3	
Informal votes		2,485	3.7	
Turnout		67,110	93.7	
Two-party-preferred result
Labor	Paul Keating		67.2	+5.6
Liberal	Salvatore Napoli		32.8	−5.6
Labor hold		Swing	+5.6	

=== Elections in the 1970s ===
==== 1977 ====
1977 Australian federal election: Blaxland
Party	Candidate	Votes	%	±%
Labor	Paul Keating	36,109	54.2	−3.1
Liberal	Salvatore Napoli	21,978	33.0	−7.3
Democrats	Steven Suli	4,500	6.8	+6.8
Independent	William Haggerty	3,974	6.0	+6.0
Total formal votes		66,561	96.3	
Informal votes		2,541	3.7	
Turnout		69,102	95.1	
Two-party-preferred result
Labor	Paul Keating		61.6	+3.8
Liberal	Salvatore Napoli		38.4	−3.8
Labor hold		Swing	+3.8	

==== 1975 ====
1975 Australian federal election: Blaxland
Party	Candidate	Votes	%	±%
Labor	Paul Keating	36,338	59.8	−7.0
Liberal	Joseph Touma	22,957	37.8	+9.1
Workers	Robert Symes	1,463	2.4	+2.4
Total formal votes		60,758	97.5	
Informal votes		1,584	2.5	
Turnout		62,342	96.2	
Two-party-preferred result
Labor	Paul Keating		60.3	−9.5
Liberal	Joseph Touma		39.7	+9.5
Labor hold		Swing	−9.5	

==== 1974 ====
1974 Australian federal election: Blaxland
Party	Candidate	Votes	%	±%
Labor	Paul Keating	40,484	66.8	+0.1
Liberal	Wallace Smallwood	17,398	28.7	−0.9
Australia	Kenneth Higgs	2,689	4.4	+4.4
Total formal votes		60,571	97.9	
Informal votes		1,311	2.1	
Turnout		61,882	96.2	
Two-party-preferred result
Labor	Paul Keating		69.8	+2.4
Liberal	Wallace Smallwood		30.2	−2.4
Labor hold		Swing	+2.4	

==== 1972 ====
1972 Australian federal election: Blaxland
Party	Candidate	Votes	%	±%
Labor	Paul Keating	36,724	66.7	+5.0
Liberal	John Ghent	16,317	29.6	−2.1
Democratic Labor	Anthony Young	2,020	3.7	−2.9
Total formal votes		55,061	97.8	
Informal votes		1,231	2.2	
Turnout		56,292	95.3	
Two-party-preferred result
Labor	Paul Keating		67.4	+4.6
Liberal	John Ghent		32.6	−4.6
Labor hold		Swing	+4.6	

=== Elections in the 1960s ===
==== 1969 ====
1969 Australian federal election: Blaxland
Party	Candidate	Votes	%	±%
Labor	Paul Keating	32,426	61.7	+10.1
Liberal	John Ghent	16,658	31.7	−11.5
Democratic Labor	Joseph Conroy	3,493	6.6	+1.4
Total formal votes		52,577	97.2	
Informal votes		1,508	2.8	
Turnout		54,085	95.1	
Two-party-preferred result
Labor	Paul Keating		62.8	+10.2
Liberal	John Ghent		37.2	−10.2
Labor hold		Swing	+10.2	

==== 1966 ====
1966 Australian federal election: Blaxland
Party	Candidate	Votes	%	±%
Labor	Eli Harrison	24,924	55.8	−5.2
Liberal	Robert Lovell	17,411	39.0	+6.4
Democratic Labor	Terence Keenan	2,299	5.2	−1.2
Total formal votes		44,634	96.6	
Informal votes		1,582	3.4	
Turnout		46,216	94.4	
Two-party-preferred result
Labor	Eli Harrison		56.8	−6.3
Liberal	Robert Lovell		43.2	+6.3
Labor hold		Swing	−6.3	

==== 1963 ====
1963 Australian federal election: Blaxland
Party	Candidate	Votes	%	±%
Labor	Eli Harrison	27,558	61.0	−5.3
Liberal	Terence Morrish	14,741	32.6	+7.2
Democratic Labor	Kevin Davis	2,883	6.4	−2.0
Total formal votes		45,182	98.1	
Informal votes		894	1.9	
Turnout		46,076	95.5	
Two-party-preferred result
Labor	Eli Harrison		63.1	−4.7
Liberal	Terence Morrish		36.9	+4.7
Labor hold		Swing	−4.7	

==== 1961 ====
1961 Australian federal election: Blaxland
Party	Candidate	Votes	%	±%
Labor	Eli Harrison	29,565	66.3	+2.6
Liberal	David Cowan	11,319	25.4	−2.1
Democratic Labor	Bernard Atkinson	3,742	8.4	−0.4
Total formal votes		44,626	97.0	
Informal votes		1,363	3.0	
Turnout		45,989	95.2	
Two-party-preferred result
Labor	Eli Harrison		67.8	+1.5
Liberal	David Cowan		32.2	−1.5
Labor hold		Swing	+1.5	

=== Elections in the 1950s ===
==== 1958 ====
1958 Australian federal election: Blaxland
Party	Candidate	Votes	%	±%
Labor	Eli Harrison	27,548	63.7	+1.2
Liberal	Winston Pickering	11,908	27.5	−10.0
Democratic Labor	Carlyle Dalgleish	3,784	8.8	+8.8
Total formal votes		43,240	96.5	
Informal votes		1,554	3.5	
Turnout		44,794	95.7	
Two-party-preferred result
Labor	Eli Harrison		66.3	+3.8
Liberal	Winston Pickering		33.7	−3.8
Labor hold		Swing	+3.8	

==== 1955 ====
1955 Australian federal election: Blaxland
Party	Candidate	Votes	%	±%
Labor	Eli Harrison	25,577	62.5	−0.6
Liberal	Reginald Allsop	15,371	37.5	+5.5
Total formal votes		40,948	96.6	
Informal votes		1,429	3.4	
Turnout		42,377	95.0	
Labor hold		Swing	−5.0	

==== 1954 ====
1954 Australian federal election: Blaxland
Party	Candidate	Votes	%	±%
Labor	Eli Harrison	27,621	64.9	+1.0
Liberal	Reginald Allsop	13,604	32.0	−4.1
Communist	Jack Hughes	1,308	3.1	+3.1
Total formal votes		42,533	98.7	
Informal votes		539	1.3	
Turnout		43,072	95.3	
Two-party-preferred result
Labor	Eli Harrison		67.7	+3.8
Liberal	Reginald Allsop		32.3	−3.8
Labor hold		Swing	+3.8	

==== 1951 ====
1951 Australian federal election: Blaxland
Party	Candidate	Votes	%	±%
Labor	Eli Harrison	25,749	63.9	+14.6
Liberal	Jim Dennison	14,547	36.1	+12.3
Total formal votes		40,296	97.5	
Informal votes		1,039	2.5	
Turnout		41,335	94.9	
Labor hold		Swing	+10.5	

=== Elections in the 1940s ===
==== 1949 ====
1949 Australian federal election: Blaxland
Party	Candidate	Votes	%	±%
Labor	Eli Harrison	19,403	49.3	+21.7
Lang Labor	Jack Lang	9,752	24.8	−15.0
Liberal	Thomas Handran-Smith	9,364	23.8	−7.7
Communist	Roy Kirby	865	2.2	+2.2
Total formal votes		39,384	98.0	
Informal votes		802	2.0	
Turnout		40,186	96.1	
Two-party-preferred result
Labor	Eli Harrison		53.4	+53.4
Lang Labor	Jack Lang		46.6	−13.9
Labor notional gain from Lang Labor		Swing	+53.4	
