= 1997 Fraser by-election =

1 February 1997
	First party	Second party	Third party
Candidate	Steve Dargavel	Cheryl Hill	Dierk von Behrens
Party	Labor	Independent	Greens
Popular vote	25,867	9,642	5,584
Percentage	49.10%	18.30%	10.60%
Swing	▼1.41pp	▲18.30pp	▲0.70pp
TPP	65.24%	34.76%
TPP swing	▲7.92pp	▲34.76pp
MP before election
John Langmore
Labor
Elected MP
Steve Dargavel
Labor

The 1997 Fraser by-election was held in the Australian electorate of Fraser in the Australian Capital Territory on 1 February 1997. The by-election was triggered by the resignation of the sitting member, the Australian Labor Party's John Langmore on 6 December 1996. The writ for the by-election was issued on 30 December 1996.

== Background ==
John Langmore had held the seat of Fraser since the 1984 election, but resigned to take up the post of Director of the Division for Social Policy and Development at the United Nations.

Cheryl Hill had previously stood for election in Fraser as a Liberal Party candidate in the 1996 federal election. She had also unsuccessfully stood for election for the New South Wales Legislative Assembly seat of Bulli in the 1991 New South Wales election. By the time of the Fraser by-election, Hill had resigned from the Liberal Party because of the party's attitude to race and immigration, and chose to run as an independent.

== Results ==
1997 Fraser by-election
Party	Candidate	Votes	%	±%
Labor	Steve Dargavel	25,867	49.10	−1.41
Independent	Cheryl Hill	9,642	18.30	+18.30
Greens	Dierk von Behrens	5,584	10.60	+0.70
Independent	Alice Chu	4,135	7.85	+7.85
Against Further Immigration	Angela Walker	1,870	3.55	+3.55
Call to Australia	John Richard Miller	1,766	3.35	+3.35
Independent	Douglas S. Thompson	1,456	2.76	+2.76
Reclaim Australia	John Hutchinson	1,228	2.33	+2.33
Advance Australia	Kevin Connor	490	0.93	+0.93
Independent	Joanne Clarke	455	0.86	+0.86
Independent	Jim Bernard	189	0.36	+0.36
Total formal votes		52,682	94.08	−2.66
Informal votes		3,313	5.92	+2.66
Turnout		55,995	85.25	−11.59
Two-candidate-preferred result
Labor	Steve Dargavel	34,370	65.24	+7.92
Independent	Cheryl Hill	18,312	34.76	+34.76
Labor hold		Swing	N/A	

== Aftermath ==
The by-election was won easily by Steve Dargavel, the ALP candidate, who held the seat until 1998 when he lost preselection in favour of Bob McMullan.

Dargavel's election saw only a minor swing away from the ALP, a remarkable result since the by-election fielded ten candidates in contrast to three candidates in the previous general election in 1996.

In contrast to Dargavel as the ALP candidate, the absence of the Liberal Party in the by-election and with their 1996 candidate Cheryl Hill running as an independent, the by-election saw Hill's personal vote dropped more than 20% in the primary vote and a fall of 8% in the two-candidate preferred basis.

== See also ==
- List of Australian federal by-elections
