= Electoral results for the Division of Fraser =

Electoral results for the Division of Fraser may refer to:

- Electoral results for the Division of Fraser (Australian Capital Territory), a former federal electoral division located in the Australian Capital Territory
- Electoral results for the Division of Fraser (Victoria), a current federal electoral division located in Victoria
