= Results of the 1987 Australian federal election in territories =

This is a list of electoral division results for the Australian 1987 federal election for the Australian Capital Territory and the Northern Territory.

== Australian Capital Territory ==
1987 Australian federal election (Australian Capital Territory)
← 1984	11 July 1987	1990 →

Both Australian Capital Territory seats in the Australian House of Representatives and both seats in the Australian Senate
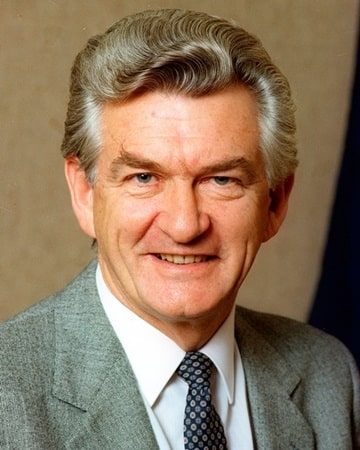

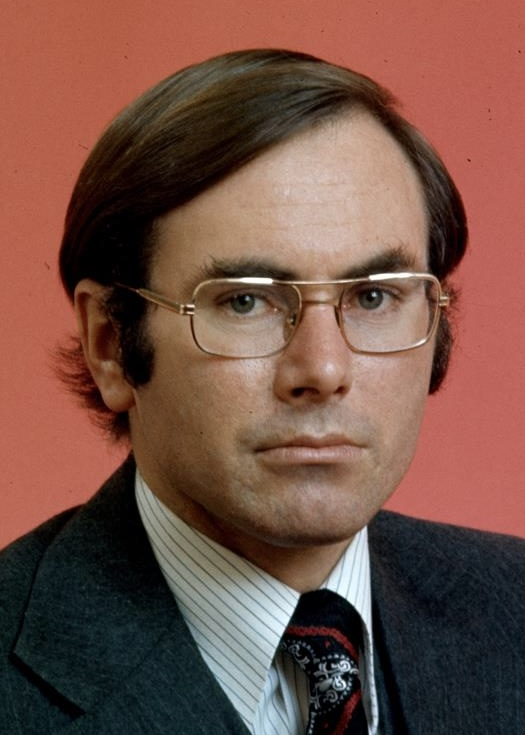
	First party	Second party
Leader	Bob Hawke	John Howard
Party	Labor	Coalition
Last election	2 seats	0 seats
Seats won	2	0
Seat change	Steady	Steady
Popular vote	79,791	44,806
Percentage	53.92%	30.28%
Swing	▲0.58	▼1.91
TPP	63.25%	38.04%
TPP swing	▲1.29	▼1.29

Turnout 94.1% (CV) — Informal 2.9%
Party	Votes	%	Swing	Seats	Change
Labor	79,791	53.92	0.58	2	Steady
Liberal	44,806	30.28	-1.91	0	Steady
Democrats	10,124	6.84	-0.77		
Nuclear Disarmament	6,912	4.67	0.99		
Family Movement	4,065	2.75	0.00		
Independent	2,290	1.55	0.48		
Total	147,988			2	
Two-party-preferred vote
Labor	93,575	63.25	1.29	2	Steady
Liberal	54,379	36.75	-1.29	0	Steady
Invalid/blank votes	5,328	3.48	-1.61		
Turnout	153,316	94.22			
Registered voters	162,717				
Source: Psephos Adam Carr's Election Archive 1987

=== Canberra ===
1987 Australian federal election: Canberra
Party	Candidate	Votes	%	±%
Labor	Ros Kelly	39,175	53.9	+2.3
Liberal	John Louttit	23,039	31.7	−1.7
Democrats	Frances English	4,712	6.5	+0.2
Nuclear Disarmament	Chris Warren	3,060	4.2	+4.2
Family Movement	Bev Cains	2,015	2.8	+2.8
Independent	John Farrell	742	1.0	+1.0
Total formal votes		72,743	96.9	
Informal votes		2,340	3.1	
Turnout		75,083	95.5	
Two-party-preferred result
Labor	Ros Kelly	45,070	62.0	+0.4
Liberal	John Louttit	27,661	38.0	−0.4
Labor hold		Swing	+0.4	

=== Fraser ===
1987 Australian federal election: Fraser
Party	Candidate	Votes	%	±%
Labor	John Langmore	40,616	54.0	−1.0
Liberal	Ian Farrow	21,767	28.9	−2.2
Democrats	Peter Hayes	5,412	7.2	−1.6
Nuclear Disarmament	Gareth Smith	3,852	5.1	+5.1
Family Movement	Dawn Casley-Smith	2,050	2.7	+2.7
Independent	Larry O'Sullivan	539	0.7	+0.7
Independent	Kevin Wise	536	0.7	+0.2
Independent	Emile Brunoro	473	0.6	−0.5
Total formal votes		75,245	96.2	
Informal votes		2,988	3.8	
Turnout		78,233	93.0	
Two-party-preferred result
Labor	John Langmore	48,505	64.5	+2.2
Liberal	Ian Farrow	26,718	35.5	−2.2
Labor hold		Swing	+2.2	

== Northern Territory ==
1987 Australian federal election (Northern Territory)
← 1984	11 July 1987	1990 →

The one Northern Territory seat in the Australian House of Representatives and both seats in the Australian Senate
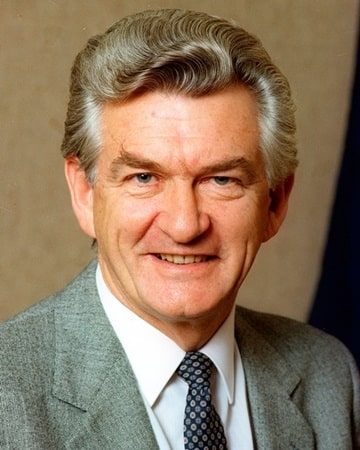

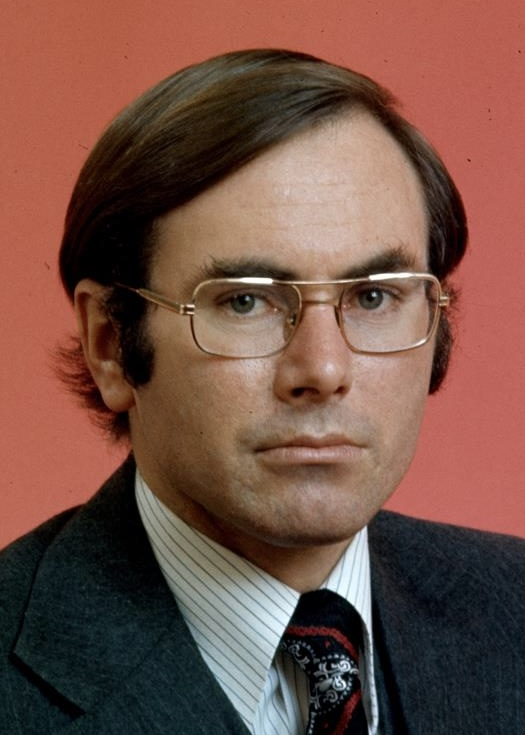
	First party	Second party
Leader	Bob Hawke	John Howard
Party	Labor	Coalition
Last election	0 seats	1 seat
Seats won	1	0
Seat change	▲1	▼1
Popular vote	28,195	21,668
Percentage	46.9%	36.0%
Swing	▲2.0	▼12.8
TPP	52.2%	47.8%
TPP swing	▲3.6	▼3.6

=== Northern Territory ===
1987 Australian federal election: Northern Territory
Party	Candidate	Votes	%	±%
Labor	Warren Snowdon	28,195	46.9	+2.0
Country Liberal	Peter Paroulakis	21,668	36.0	−12.8
NT Nationals	Bob Liddle	10,273	17.1	+17.1
Total formal votes		60,136	94.2	
Informal votes		3,684	5.8	
Turnout		63,820	79.9	
Two-party-preferred result
Labor	Warren Snowdon	31,386	52.2	+3.6
Country Liberal	Peter Paroulakis	28,723	47.8	−3.6
Labor gain from Country Liberal		Swing	+3.6	

== See also ==
- Results of the 1987 Australian federal election (House of Representatives)
- Members of the Australian House of Representatives, 1987–1990
