= Kenneth Fry =

Kenneth Fry may refer to:

- Ken Fry (1920–2007), Member of the Australian House of Representatives
- Kenneth Fry (cricketer) (1883–1949), English cricketer
