= Dargavel =

Dargavel is a surname. Notable people with the surname include:

- John Robertson Dargavel (1846–1930), Canadian farmer, merchant, and political figure
- Steve Dargavel (born 1966), Australian politician
