= Harold Quodling =

Australian public servant

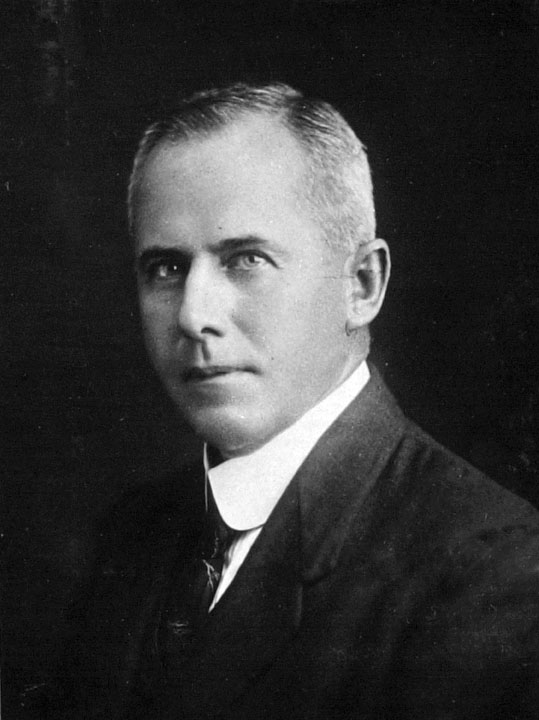
- Born: 1872; New South Wales
- Died: 1960; Queensland
- Education: Newington College; Hawkesbury Agricultural College
- Occupation: Public Servant

Harold Cecil Quodling (1872–1960) was an Australian Public Servant who was the Queensland Director of Agriculture (1915-1931) and General Manager of the Agricultural Bank (1931-1937).

== Biography ==
He attended Newington College entering in 1881 from his family residence in Burwood and graduated from Hawkesbury Agricultural College in 1891. Quodling entered the Queensland Agricultural Department as a farm foreman at the Gatton Agriculture College and subsequently managed the state farms at Westbrook, Queensland and Hermitage, Warwick, Queensland. After a term as an agricultural inspector he was appointed acting principal of Gatton College in 1910. In 1915 he became Director of Agriculture until his transfer to the management of the Agriculture Bank in 1931. In 1937 he retired, having reached the statutory age limit, but was recalled to help the department during World War II.
