= Results of the 1984 Australian federal election in territories =

This is a list of electoral division results for the Australian 1984 federal election for the Australian Capital Territory and the Northern Territory.

== Australian Capital Territory ==
1984 Australian federal election (Australian Capital Territory)
← 1983	5 March 1984	1987 →

Both Australian Capital Territory seats in the Australian House of Representatives and both seats in the Australian Senate
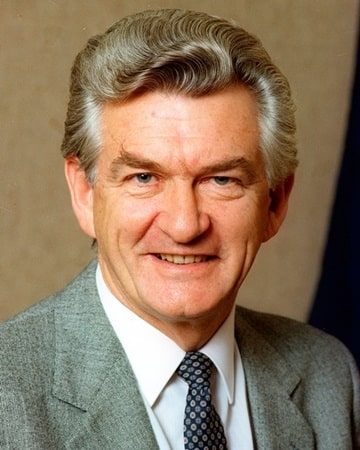

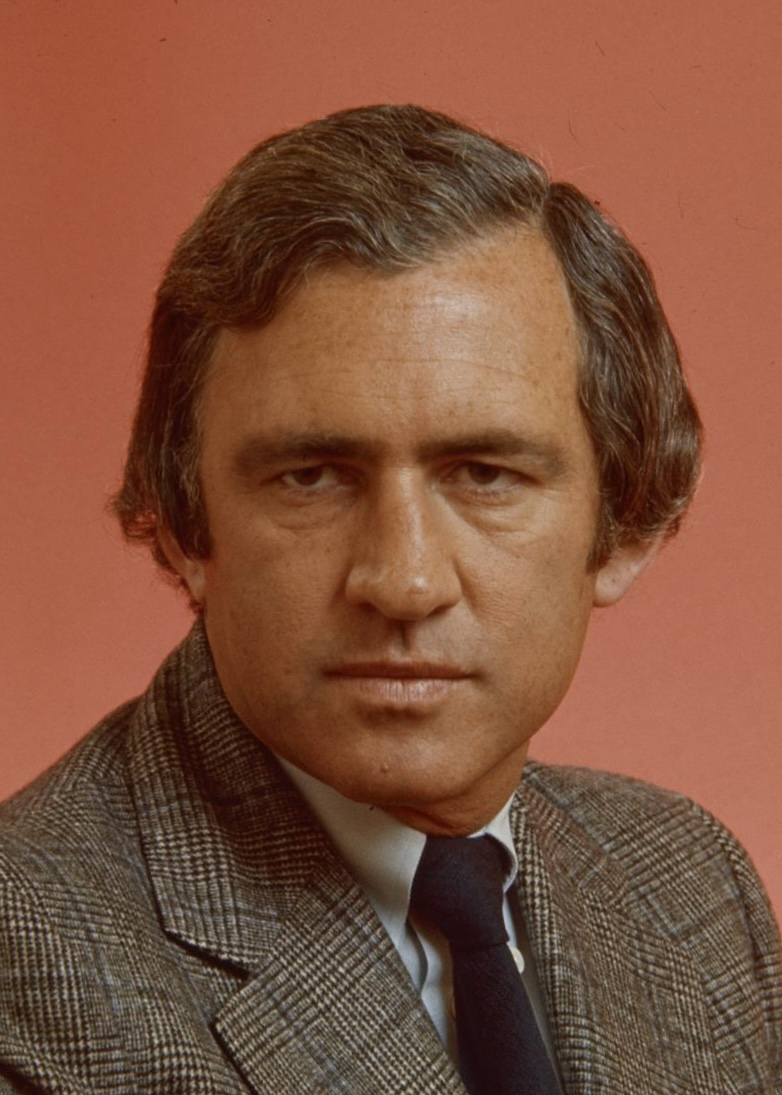
	First party	Second party
Leader	Bob Hawke	Andrew Peacock
Party	Labor	Coalition
Last election	2 seats	0 seats
Seats won	2	0
Seat change	Steady	Steady
Popular vote	71,637	43,225
Percentage	53.34%	32.19%
Swing	▼10.56	▲0.15
TPP	61.96%	38.04%
TPP swing	▼3.53	▲3.53

Turnout 94.1% (CV) — Informal 2.9%
Party	Votes	%	Swing	Seats	Change
Labor	71,637	53.34	-10.56	2	Steady
Liberal	43,225	32.19	+0.15	0	Steady
Democrats	10,225	7.61			
Nuclear Disarmament	4,945	3.68			
Deadly Serious	2,826	2.10	-0.86		
Independents	1,435	1.07	-0.03		
Total	134,293			2	
Two-party-preferred vote
Labor	83,207	61.96	-3.53	2	Steady
Liberal	51,074	38.04	3.53	0	Steady
Invalid/blank votes	7,204	5.09	2.88		
Turnout	141,497	94.07			
Registered voters	150,416				
Source: Federal Election Results 1949-1993

=== Canberra ===
1984 Australian federal election: Canberra
Party	Candidate	Votes	%	±%
Labor	Ros Kelly	33,454	51.6	−10.4
Liberal	Gary Humphries	21,667	33.4	−1.2
Nuclear Disarmament	Robyn Hancock	4,945	7.6	+7.6
Democrats	Fiona Richardson	4,087	6.3	+6.3
Deadly Serious	Joanne Hansen	724	1.1	−2.3
Total formal votes		64,877	95.8	
Informal votes		2,829	4.2	
Turnout		67,706	94.2	
Two-party-preferred result
Labor	Ros Kelly	39,946	61.6	−2.1
Liberal	Gary Humphries	24,931	38.4	+2.1
Labor hold		Swing	−2.1	

=== Fraser ===
1984 Australian federal election: Fraser
Party	Candidate	Votes	%	±%
Labor	John Langmore	38,183	55.0	−10.0
Liberal	John McLaren	21,558	31.1	+0.9
Democrats	Andrew Freeman	6,138	8.8	+8.8
Deadly Serious	Rozalyn Daniell	2,102	3.0	+0.5
Independent	Emile Brunoro	737	1.1	+1.1
Independent	Kevin Wise	353	0.5	−1.7
Independent	Arthur Burns	345	0.5	+0.5
Total formal votes		69,416	94.1	
Informal votes		4,375	5.9	
Turnout		73,791	94.0	
Two-party-preferred result
Labor	John Langmore	43,261	62.3	−5.1
Liberal	John McLaren	26,143	37.7	+5.1
Labor hold		Swing	−5.1	

== Northern Territory ==
1984 Australian federal election (Northern Territory)
← 1983	5 March 1984	1987 →

The one Northern Territory seat in the Australian House of Representatives and both seats in the Australian Senate
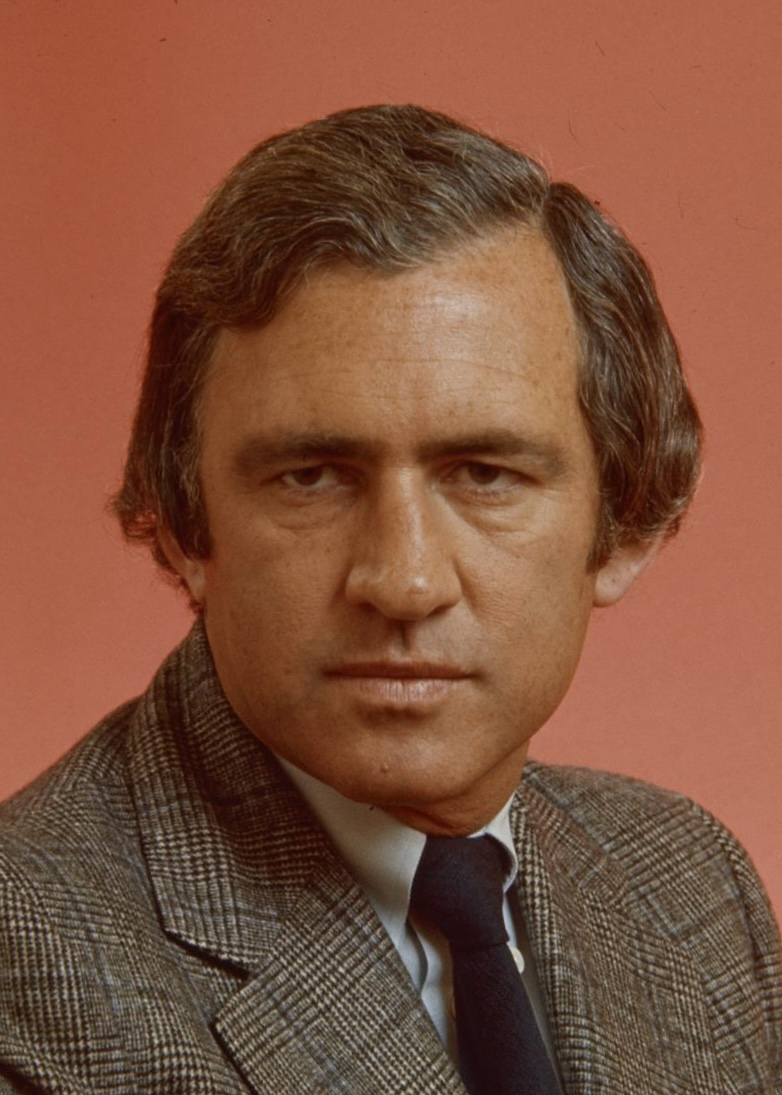

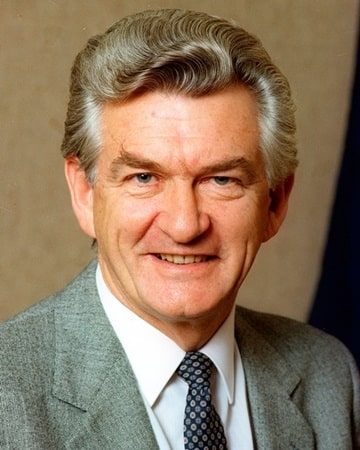
	First party	Second party
Leader	Andrew Peacock	Bob Hawke
Party	Coalition	Labor
Last election	0 seats	1 seat
Seats won	1	0
Seat change	▲1	▼1
Popular vote	27,335	25,140
Percentage	48.8%	44.9%
Swing	▲2.0	▼1.7
TPP	51.4%	48.6%
TPP swing	▲3.3	▼3.3

=== Northern Territory ===
1984 Australian federal election: Northern Territory
Party	Candidate	Votes	%	±%
Country Liberal	Paul Everingham	27,335	48.8	+2.0
Labor	John Reeves	25,140	44.9	−1.7
Democrats	Wiyendji Roberts	1,906	3.4	−0.1
Independent	Phil Ward	1,191	2.1	+2.1
Independent	Strider	390	0.7	+0.1
Total formal votes		55,962	95.1	
Informal votes		2,909	4.9	
Turnout		58,871	85.5	
Two-party-preferred result
Country Liberal	Paul Everingham	28,747	51.4	+3.3
Labor	John Reeves	27,194	48.6	−3.3
Country Liberal gain from Labor		Swing	+3.3	

== See also ==
- Results of the 1984 Australian federal election (House of Representatives)
- Members of the Australian House of Representatives, 1984–1987
