= Toxana =

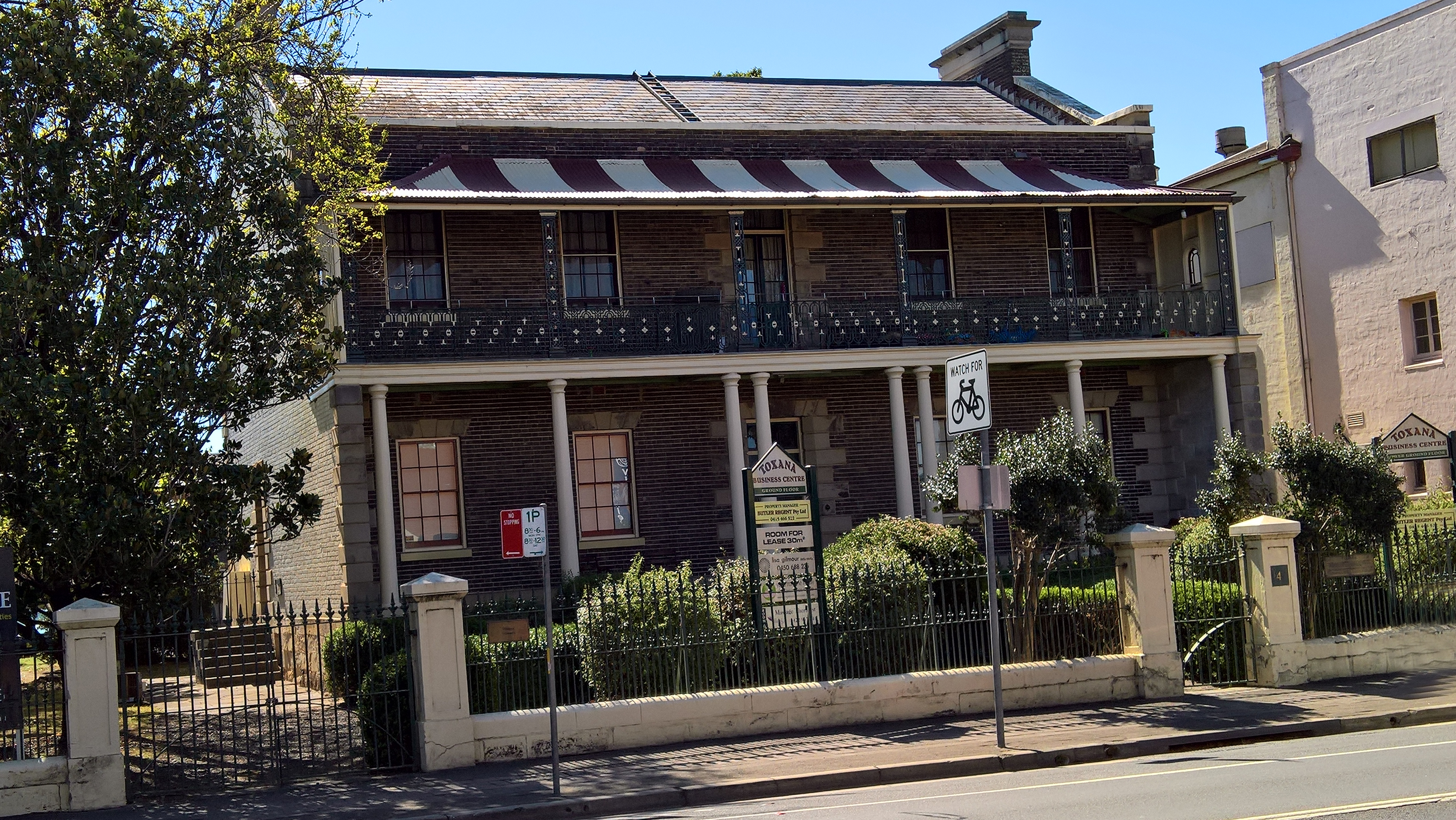
- Toxana, 157 Windsor Street, Richmond, New South Wales

- Location within New South Wales Location within Australia
- 33.5976°S 150.7534°E
- Location: 157 Windsor Street, Richmond, City of Hawkesbury, New South Wales, Australia

History
- Built: 1843–1844

Site notes
- Owner: Edds Family Superannuation Fund

New South Wales Heritage Register
- Official name: Toxana
- Type: state heritage (built)
- Designated: 2 April 1999
- Reference no.: 14
- Type: Town House
- Category: Residential buildings (private)
- Builders: James Melville (bricks); George Marlin (carpentry)

Toxana is a heritage-listed residence and initial premises of the Hawkesbury Agricultural College (1891-1896) at 147 Windsor Street, Richmond, City of Hawkesbury, New South Wales, Australia. It was added to the New South Wales State Heritage Register on 2 April 1999.

== History ==
The lower Hawkesbury was home to the Dharug people. The proximity to the Nepean River and South Creek qualifies it as a key area for food resources for indigenous groups. The Dharug and Darkinjung people called the river Deerubbin and it was a vital source of food and transport.

Governor Arthur Phillip explored the local area in search of suitable agricultural land in 1789 and discovered and named the Hawkesbury River after Baron Hawkesbury. This region played a significant role in the early development of the colony with European settlers established here by 1794. Situated on fertile floodplains and well known for its abundant agriculture, Green Hills (as it was originally called) supported the colony through desperate times. However, frequent flooding meant that the farmers along the riverbanks were often ruined.

John Bowman (1763-1825) arrived in NSW in 1798 and settled at Richmond, farming the property "Archerfield" which he received as a grant of 100 acres on 8 April 1799. He came from England as a free settler under certain encouraging conditions.

Bowman quickly identified himself with the cause of free settlers on the Hawkesbury, opposing the monopolistic practices of the New South Wales Corps and supporting stable government as administered by Governors William Bligh and Lachlan Macquarie. The settlers submitted various petitions and addresses from time to time to the Governors, particularly to Bligh, and even wrote to Viscount Castlereagh, Colonial Secretary in England, plainly stating their case against the military faction. Their efforts were rewarded by the instructions given to Macquarie to give help and encouragement to the smaller settlers, and by the decline of the influence of the military during his governorship.

After Bligh was deposed by the Rum Rebellion, the Hawkesbury settlers still persisted in supporting the deposed Governor and stating their claims, and fourteen of them, including Bowman, sent off the 1809 memorial to Viscount Castlereagh stating that they had no hand in the rebellion.

Under Macquarie, who replaced Bligh from 1 January 1810, the colony prospered. He implemented an unrivalled public works program, completing 265 public buildings, establishing new public amenities and improving existing services such as roads. In December 1810, he proclaimed the five Macquarie Towns in the Hawkesbury Region, including Richmond. As a result, the locality became more permanent, with streets, public buildings, and a town square (Richmond Park).

When Macquarie had brought stability to the colony, and regained respect for the administration, Bowman concentrated on farming pursuits.

John Bowman was promised land (the site that would become Toxana) by Macquarie. In 1821 he commenced building a house on Richmond's main street, now 367 Windsor Street. He died on 16 December 1825, and left his house to his son, George Bowman, who lived until 1878 and concerned himself with farming and grazing stock on the Hunter River, as well as with public affairs, being elected to the new Parliament of New South Wales in 1851.

John and Honor Bowman had four children and their son William is listed in the 1828 census as having 300 acres at Richmond, with 137 of these cleared and 130 cultivated. He also had four horses and two horned cattle at this time.

In the 1830s William Bowman (the fourth and youngest child of John) became interested in the promotion of free immigration to the colony. He left for a two-year visit to England in 1836, and married Elizabeth Arthur there. In 1837, to sponsor immigrants, he signed an agreement with John Marshall, captain of the ship City of Edinburgh, to pay for the passage of twelve married couples from London to Sydney.

William Bowman was granted the site of Toxana, in Windsor Street, Richmond between Market and Toxana Streets, c. 1830s. H. F. White's 1836 survey of Richmond shows six buildings on Bowman's land, all of which pre-date Toxana. A garden and a series of sheds were shown on the future site of Toxana. Toxana's construction dates are the subject of conflicting sources, but the building's heritage listing notes that recent research suggests its construction dates were probably 1843-4.

There is some dispute as to the identify of Toxana's builder, some claiming it was (carpenter) George Marlin and others asserting brick layer James Melville was the builder. Sam Boughton writing under pseudonym of "Cooramil" in the early 20th century claimed that George Marlin built it after coming under contract from England with his family. Marlin and family settled in Richmond afterwards. George C Johston writing under pseudonym "Cooyal" disputed whether it was built by Marlin and claimed the builder was James Melville. Johnston had heard from Melville himself that he had done the brickwork on Toxana and seen Melville's receipts for sand and other materials for the work. "Cooramil" replied agreeing Melville completed the brickwork, and remembered him working there. It appears that about 1842, James Melville and George Martin/Marlin (who had done the carpenter's and joiner's work with his three sons George Jr., Phil and Jack) erected Toxana for Bowman.

William Bowman, along with his older brother George, played a major role in the development of the district, involved in pastoralism and farming and prominent in public affairs. He also owned several properties in the Bathurst district and was involved in wine-growing. Toxana was a substantial town house erected at the height of the 1840s boom before depression meant straitened circumstances for many of the pastoral elite of the colony. It represents an expression of optimism in a time of boom.

William Bowman died at Richmond on 11 December 1874 and is buried in St Peter's graveyard. The property was left to his wife Elizabeth, who lived there until her death on 25 November 1885. It passed to Ann Catherine Cadell, widow of Thomas Cadell. On 5 January 1881 Cadell (of Mullanmuddy, near Mudgee) mortgaged her life estate under Bowman's will to Thomas Forster Knox of Sydney and Henry Edward Augustus Allan, merchant of Sydney for 3 years. This included various land parcels, but not Toxana. There were doubts whether it did include Toxana in some later legal transactions.

Eliza Sophia Cameron, née Bowman, wife of Rev. James Cameron died on 27 January 1886. In that year Ann Cadell agreed to sell Toxana and 8 acres of land in Windsor Street to Rev. Cameron for 5000 pounds if she could get the agreement of all the children affected. This was done and she signed a conveyance of the land on 17 June 1886. The land consisted of two lots: the first 4 acres 3 roods 24 perches on which Toxana sat and the second was part of lot 2 section 11.

Toxana became the property of the Rev. James Cameron (bought in 1886, releasing the mortgage from Cadell). He was later Moderator-General of the Presbyterian Church in Australia.

Photographs from 1888 show the front of Toxana obscured by a large jacaranda (Jacaranda mimosifolia) tree on the eastern side and an even larger pair of trees on the western side - these appear to be a silky oak (Grevillea robusta) and a Southern nettle tree/ hackberry (Celtis australis). The front fence at this time was a low masonry wall, with stone pillared gate posts; a wrought iron and "crinkle wire" gate; and low wrought iron balustrade (possibly infilled with wire mesh) atop the masonry wall - the whole below 1m high.

In 1891 it was leased by the newly set up Hawkesbury Agricultural College to provide temporary accommodation for its students, who (25 students originally) took up occupation on 10 March 1891. The College was officially opened on 16 March 1891, a photo shows the Ministerial party and others on Toxana's front steps. An 1891 photo showing the view up Windsor Street from Toxana's upper verandah showed some details of its timber picket, apparently white fence, and what appear to be two Mediterranean cypresses (Cupressus sempervirens) in the front western-half garden.

Meals were served in the basement and lectures held in the eastern front verandah room. The rest of Toxana was used for student accommodation. In 1892 meals were taken at Toxana (soon known as the No. 1 College) in the large double first floor room, whilst the front half of that room was used as the first lecture room. The college's work horses were housed in the stables behind Toxana. The College's Ayrshire bull was kept in the "Toxana paddock" and a rough dairy operated in old sheds behind Toxana, where primitive conditions hampered production, halted the manufacture of cheese most of the time and blighted students with fleas. In October 1891 some students moved out of Toxana into Towns' house known as No. 2 College). In 1896 all students moved into the purpose-built college erected on the College site in Ham Common (south-east of the town).

The College gave scientific and practical training to aspiring young farmers, and had acquired land just out of Richmond.

A heavy wind was recorded as having blown down the upper verandah of No. 1 College (Toxana) on 16 August 1892. When a water supply was turned on for Richmond on 27 October 1892 Toxana began to receive a piped water supply replacing the earlier supply from tanks on its roof. Early in 1893 a bee farm was established in the walled-in garden behind Toxana and remained there until moved in 1894. A photo shows staff and students on Toxana's front steps in 1894.

Cameron applied to bring Toxana's land under Torrens Title on 6 October 1893. He noted that it was leased to the Department of Mines and Agriculture and used as an agricultural college. A certificate of title was issued to him for 7 acres 3 roods 9 perches on 22 January 1894. It was replaced on 24 April 1899 by a new certificate of title for 7 acres 3 roods 22 perches to take account of the amended area after the new survey.

A draft conservation plan for Toxana prepared by Graham Edds & Associates provided a series of historic photographs over the life of the building which reveal change in the landscaping of the forecourt since c. 1842. The earliest photograph located to date appeared in the Hawkesbury Agricultural College Journal of 1907.

A photo from the 1890s or 1900s from the Woodhill collection shows a masonry low balustrade and iron picket fence, with masonry pillars had replaced the earlier timber pickets. This photo also clearly shows the large jacaranda and silky oak trees part-obscuring the house's street front.

Cameron died on 8 September 1905. Toxana was then leased to "Head Quarters 3rd Australian Infantry Regiment" at 75 pounds per annum, and estimated to be worth 2000 pounds including the land value according to valuer C.S.Guest. Richmond was the headquarters of the 3rd Australian Infantry Regiment and Guest, who happened to be the unit's commander, as Lt. Col. Charles Septimus Guest. He was Mayor of Richmond from 1906-07.

Title passed to the Perpetual Trustee Co. Ltd. as executor of Cameron's will on 24 February 1906. E. H. Cowdery surveyed the land for auction sale in 10/1906. Auction of the Toxana Estate, with its surrounding land divided into 25 lots was held on 3 November 1906. Toxana stood on a triple lot (Lot 7) aside three lots to its east facing Windsor Street.

Toxana's lot 7, plus lots 6 (immediately to its north) and 10 (the south-eastern corner lot facing Windsor Street) were transferred to George Edward Woodhill of Richmond, store keeper, with the certificate of title issued to him on 18 April 1907. The property was converted into and leased as flats, though the date of conversion is unknown.

On 8 January 1920 part of lot 7 (15.75 perches) at the corner of Windsor and East Market Street was sold to James Timmins Jr., of Richmond, butcher and a new certificate of title was issued to George Woodhill, then living at Coogee, store keeper, for lot 10 DP 4906 and lot 6 and part of lot 7 (containing Toxana).

On 15 April 1921 Lot 6 and part lot 7 (containing Toxana) DP 4906 totalling 3 roods 6.75 perches were transferred to John Mulvena of Richmond, chemist and a new certificate of title was issued to him on 14 September 1921. A mortgage of 15 April 1921 to George Woodhill of Coogee, store keeper was discharged on 17 March 1923. A survey of the land for subdivision dated show of 23 October 1934ed no detail of buildings. After two parcels of land, part of that property, were transferred in 12/1934 a new certificate of title was issued on 22 February 1935 to Mulvena, who was then living in Marrickville.

On 7 May 1942 during the World War II the combined ministers of Richmond requested that the Army lease Toxana for a service club to be operated by the combined churches. When the property was examined on 8 May, it was occupied by "Kellie". The owner was Chandos Scouller of Glamis Park, North Richmond. The upper flat was occupied by Leading Aircraftsman Stocks of the RAAF and his wife. RAAF headquarters requested that Stocks be allowed to remain due to the rapid expansion of Richmond air base and the difficulty of obtaining accommodation. Stock's flat had a separate entrance so the lower floor could be used as a club. The lease was never implemented.

After the death of Scouller, the property passed to the Perpetual Trustee Co. on 31 May 1960, who transferred it to Isabel Valentine Scouller of North Richmond, spinster on 24 August 1971.

In 1978 Toxana was bought by Windsor Municipal Council for $75,000 and restored at a cost of $179.500 with assistance from the Commonwealth Government grants program. The formal transfer to the Council was signed on 29 November 1978 and it was mortgaged to Isabel Scouller until discharged on 29 November 1979. A series of photographs from before 1978 are held at the Hawkesbury City Library's local studies collection and document the state of the building before conservation work commenced. Another series of photographs held in HCL's local studies collection document the 1978 restoration works to the building.

Fisher Lucas Architects were engaged by Council to prepare documentation for the building and forecourt restoration. Council staff supervised the works. The former forecourt planting was removed and replaced as part of these works. Some of the original front fence was removed/relocated during works. A jacaranda (Jacaranda mimosifolia) tree in the eastern portion of the forecourt was retained. Photographs show another jacaranda on the west of the house.

A March 1979 garden plan and fence details prepared by Fisher Lucas confirms that the subject sweet bay/ bay laurel (Laurus nobilis) were planted as part of the replacement forecourt garden. With the exception of the Queensland. black bean (Castanospermum australe) and date palm (Phoenix sp.) still within the rear yard, none of the former mature trees indicated on that plan (figure 1-4) or noted on the detail drawing (figure 1-5) below are extant in 2013.

Toxana was given a Permanent Conservation Order under the NSW Heritage Act on 23 July 1979 and entered on the Register of the National Estate on 21 October 1980. On 2 April 1999 it was listed on the NSW State Heritage Register.

By 29 November 1979 the property was leased to the Commonwealth of Australia. A lease of rooms 1, 3-5 and 7 of the ground floor to the Commonwealth of Australia followed on 9 October 1981.

On 18 June 1988 the basement was leased to Paul James Clarke, Malcolm James Dahmes and Graham Allen Paull.

Unspecified works were undertaken by Council in the 1990s, apparently in the roof space.

== Description ==
Toxana is on a lot facing Richmond's main street, near its main intersection and Richmond Park. The site has a set back from the street with a front garden, behind a masonry pier and iron palisade fence. At the rear is a driveway and car parking area.

Toxana has outstanding Regency and Georgian detailing. It is a substantial two storey house with iron-work balustrading and open iron columns on the first floor, while the ground storey has tapered round timber columns. The house is raised well above ground level and has a very prominent entry. It is built of face brick with sandstone quoins and reveals, as well as heavy stonework surrounding the front door.

== Heritage listing ==
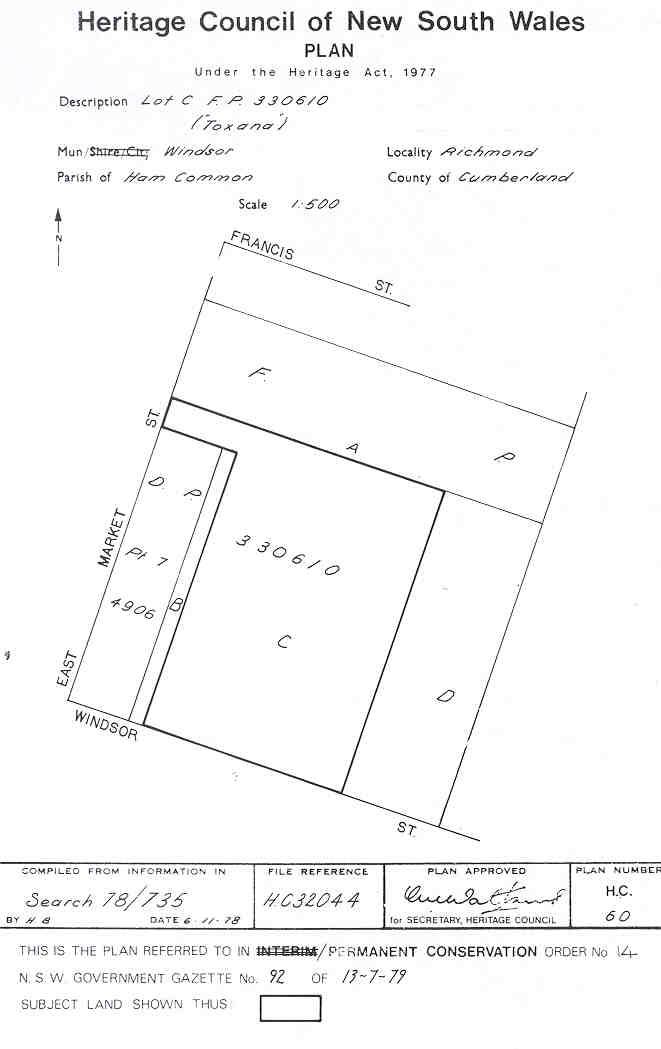
Heritage boundaries

Toxana dates from c. 1840 and was built for William Bowman who was elected to the first Parliament of NSW in 1843. Toxana is one of the most important house in the Richmond district with important historic associations and outstanding Regency and Georgian detailing. The house is a substantial two storey building with iron-work balustrading and open iron columns on the first floor, while the ground storey has tapered round timber columns. The house, which is raised well above ground, level and has a very prominent entry. The house is built of face brick with sandstone quoins and reveals, as well as heavy stonework surrounding the front door.

Toxana was listed on the New South Wales State Heritage Register on 2 April 1999.
