= Andrew Leigh =

Australian politician (born 1972)

The Honourable Dr Andrew Leigh FASSA MP
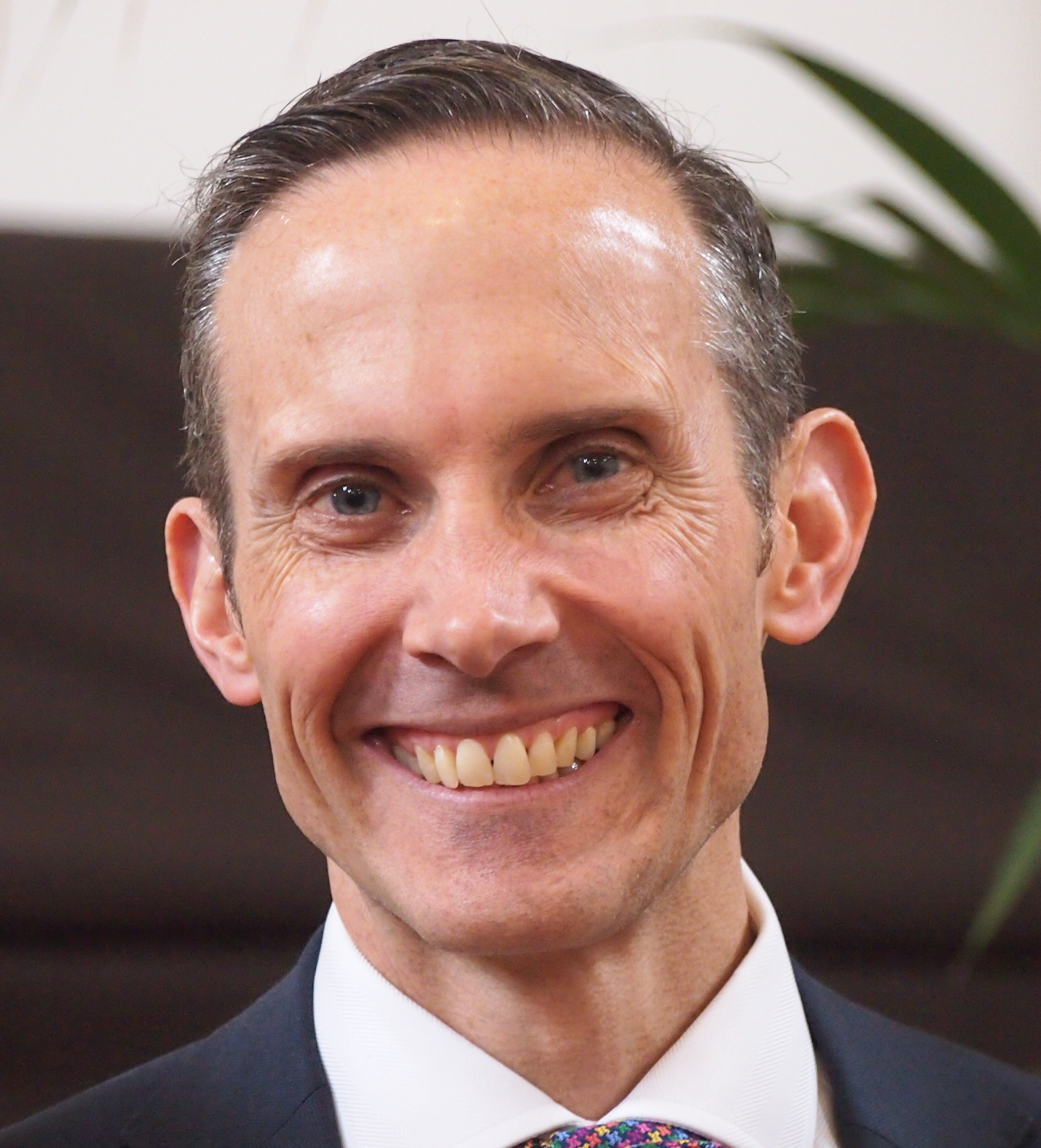
- Leigh in 2017

Assistant Minister for Productivity, Competition, Charities and Treasury
- Incumbent
- Assumed office 13 May 2025
- Prime Minister: Anthony Albanese
- Preceded by: Himself (as Assistant Minister for Competition, Charities and Treasury)

Assistant Minister for Competition, Charities and Treasury
- In office 23 May 2022 – 13 May 2025
- Prime Minister: Anthony Albanese
- Preceded by: Position created
- Succeeded by: Himself (as Assistant Minister for Productivity, Competition, Charities and Treasury)

Assistant Minister for Employment
- In office 23 May 2023 – 13 May 2025
- Prime Minister: Anthony Albanese
- Preceded by: Position created
- Succeeded by: Patrick Gorman (as Assistant Minister for Employment and Workplace Relations)

Member of the Australian Parliament for Fenner
- Incumbent
- Assumed office 2 July 2016
- Preceded by: New seat

Member of the Australian Parliament for Fraser
- In office 21 August 2010 – 2 July 2016
- Preceded by: Bob McMullan
- Succeeded by: Division abolished

Personal details
- Born: Andrew Keith Leigh; 3 August 1972 (age 54) Sydney, Australia
- Party: Labor
- Spouse: Gweneth
- Children: 3 sons
- Education: University of Sydney (BA, LLB); Harvard Kennedy School (MPA, PhD)
- Occupation: Politician
- Profession: Lawyer, academic, political adviser
- Website: www.andrewleigh.com

Andrew Keith Leigh (born 3 August 1972) is an Australian politician, author, lawyer and former professor of economics at the Australian National University. He currently serves as the Assistant Minister for Productivity, Competition, Charities and Treasury. He briefly served as the Parliamentary Secretary to Prime Minister Julia Gillard in 2013 and then served as Shadow Assistant Treasurer from 2013 to 2019. He has been a Labor member of the Australian House of Representatives since 2010 representing the seat of Fraser until 2016 and Fenner thereafter. Leigh is not a member of any factions of the Labor Party.

== Early life and education ==
Both Leigh's parents are academics and both came from homes of social activists "in the Christian socialist tradition". Leigh's maternal grandfather, a boilermaker and Methodist lay preacher, used the family's spare room to shelter a constant stream of refugees from places like Cambodia and Chile, who were escaping the regimes of Pol Pot and Augusto Pinochet.

Leigh's early years of education were in Sydney, Melbourne, Malaysia and Indonesia before completing secondary education at James Ruse Agricultural High School in Sydney, New South Wales. He graduated from the University of Sydney with a Bachelor of Arts with First Class Honours in 1994, and a Bachelor of Laws with First Class Honours in 1996. He then obtained a Master of Public Administration degree and a PhD in Public Policy from Harvard Kennedy School, where his thesis was "Essays in poverty and inequality". At Harvard, Leigh was a Doctoral Fellow at the Malcolm Wiener Centre for Social Policy from 2002 to 2004, and a Frank Knox Fellow from 2000 to 2004.

Leigh has been a member of the Australian Labor Party since 1991.

Leigh is one of at least ten MPs in the 47th Parliament of Australia who possess PhD degrees, the others including Anne Aly, Jim Chalmers, Andrew Charlton, Daniel Mulino, Jess Walsh, Carina Garland, Adam Bandt, Mehreen Faruqi, Anne Webster and Helen Haines.

== Professional career ==
Before entering politics, Leigh worked as a lawyer for Minter Ellison in Sydney and Clifford Chance in London from 1995 to 1997. He was then associate to Justice Michael Kirby of the High Court of Australia from 1997 to 1998. Leigh has said that he "probably learnt more from (Kirby) than anyone except for my parents" He was senior trade adviser to Shadow Minister for Trade Senator Peter Cook from 1998 to 2000, and research fellow with the Progressive Policy Institute in Washington, D.C. in 2001. Leigh also served as a principal adviser to the Australian Treasury from 2008 to 2009.

== Academic career ==
Leigh was Professor of Economics at the Australian National University from 2004 to 2010. He also had several visiting appointments at the University of Melbourne, New York University, the Research Institute of Industrial Economics and the University of Michigan. Over his academic career, Leigh has published over 100 journal articles in the disciplines of economics, public policy and law and over 200 opinion pieces. Since entering parliament in 2010, he has authored or co-authored ten books.

== Political career ==
In the 1995 NSW election, Leigh stood as the Labor candidate for the New South Wales state seat of Northcott, receiving an 8-point swing, but nonetheless losing by a large margin to Barry O'Farrell of the Liberal Party. Since then, O'Farrell occasionally sends Leigh "lovely little handwritten congratulations" for life milestones.

On 24 April 2010, Leigh was selected as Labor's candidate for the Australian federal seat of Fraser following the announced retirement of Bob McMullan. Fraser was a safe Labor seat. Leigh was subsequently elected in the Australian federal election held on 21 August 2010.

=== Gillard government ministry ===
In 2013, Leigh served as the government spokesperson on Opposition costings. Leigh was then promoted into the Ministry of Julia Gillard on the 25 March 2013 as the Parliamentary Secretary to the Prime Minister following a Cabinet reshuffle in the wake of a failed leadership challenge on Prime Minister Julia Gillard. Leigh, a supporter of Gillard, lost this position after the June 2013 Labor leadership spill.

=== Shorten and Albanese shadow ministry ===
After the 2013 federal election, Leigh was appointed by Bill Shorten as Shadow Assistant Treasurer and Shadow Minister for Competition. After the 2016 federal election, Leigh continued as the Shadow Assistant Treasurer and added the portfolios of Shadow Minister for Competition and Productivity, Shadow Minister for Charities and Not-for-Profits, and Shadow Minister for Trade in Services.

After the 2019 federal election, Leigh was dropped from the outer ministry of the Shadow Ministry of Anthony Albanese due to his decision to remain factionally unaligned. Leigh however was appointed to the parliamentary secretary-level positions of Shadow Assistant Minister for Treasury and Shadow Assistant Minister for Charities.

=== Albanese government ministry ===
After the 2022 federal election, Leigh was appointed the Assistant Minister for Competition, Charities and Treasury. In this role, he has criticised the lack of dynamism in the Australian economy, and the decline in social capital in the Australian community. In May 2023, Leigh was appointed Assistant Minister for Employment. Following the re-election of the Albanese government in the 2025 federal election, Leigh was appointed Assistant Minister for Productivity, Competition, Charities and Treasury to the second Albanese ministry.

In 2026, the Australian parliament approved Deductible Gift Recipient (DGR) status for Equality Australia, specifically listing the charity in the Income Tax Assessment Act 1997. Around 230 charities (out of 29,000) are specifically listed in this way. Specific listing is only open to charities that are not eligible for endorsement by the ATO under a DGR category, as was the case with Equality Australia. The decision on ineligibility was made by the Australian Charities and Not-for-profits Commission, and was unsuccessfully appealed by Equality Australia to the Federal Court. Specific listing was announced in the 2025 budget, and implemented by parliament through the Treasury Laws Amendment (Supporting Choice in Superannuation and Other Measures) Bill 2025, which became law on 26 March 2026.

== Political views ==
Leigh identifies as a social democrat, but within the Australian Labor Party he is aligned to no faction. He has argued that Labor MPs should have more autonomy to dissent from caucus decisions. In a 2002 book he co-edited with the political scientist David Burchell, The Prince's New Clothes: Why Do Australians Dislike Their Politicians? Leigh suggested a more aggressive media, which covers politics like sport and gossip, and a general breakdown in "interpersonal" trust were largely responsible for politicians' falling stocks.

In making his first speech, he identified the American Democratic Senator, Daniel Patrick Moynihan, as a role model. In the central part of his speech, he spoke about the Australian Project:

This Australian project is not finished. It’s not something that stopped with the end of the First World War or with the death of Ben Chifley....To me, the Australian project is about encouraging economic growth, while ensuring that its benefits are shared across the community. It is about making sure that all Australians have great public services, regardless of ethnicity, income or postcode. And it is about recognising that governments have a role in expanding opportunities, because no child gets to choose the circumstances of their birth.

=== Economic growth ===
Leigh believes the "passion for raising living standards" is part of the Australian identity. He believes growth comes with free markets and innovation — and he strongly identifies with the liberalism of Australia's second Prime Minister, Alfred Deakin. In 2019, Leigh claimed the beliefs of the contemporary Australian Labor Party was that of social liberalism. Leigh credits Labor to being the inheritor of small-l liberalism in Australia, and that "social liberals have been cast out of the Liberal Party of Australia". In the digital age, that liberalism means a market that is free to develop technological innovation, even with its "creative destruction". With his co-author Joshua Gans, Leigh has argued that the state must be wary of making entrepreneurs face prohibitively high costs, even as they face high chance of failure.

=== Community ===
When Leigh went to Harvard for post-graduate research, he studied under the social scientist Robert Putnam, who had published the major work on declining social capital in America, Bowling Alone. Leigh has observed that Australians also 'bowl alone', as they are financially stretched, time poor, and unable to make regular commitments. Leigh is concerned that online communities have actually created more alienation for Australians, but this can be ameliorated when the state encourages volunteering and community groups.

=== Opportunity ===
Inequality is a key concern for Leigh, whose research has indicated that inequality is at a 75-year high within Australia. Though Leigh maintains that inequality is not automatically a bad thing in itself, it does concern him in practice because he believes that "rising inequality strains the social fabric". As a result, Leigh advocates some redistribution of wealth, in order to maintain opportunity for people. Leigh particularly wants to see university made more affordable than it is for most young people now.

== Honours and awards ==
Leigh delivered the 2004 Garran Oration of the Institute of Public Administration Australia. In 2006 he was awarded the Best Discussant Award at the Annual PhD Conference in Economics and Business in 2006 and the Early Career Award by the Academy of the Social Sciences in Australia. Also in 2011 Leigh was appointed a Fellow of the Academy of the Social Sciences in Australia. In 2011, Leigh was awarded the Economic Society of Australia's Young Economist Award. This award, presented once every two years, is given to "honour that Australian economist under the age of forty who is deemed to have made a significant contribution to economic thought and knowledge". In 2022, Leigh was awarded the Accountability Round Table's John Button integrity award.

== Sport ==
Leigh is the first sitting Australian politician to complete the following:

- The six World Marathon Majors (Berlin, Tokyo, Boston, London, Chicago and New York)
- The Comrades Ultramarathon
- The Cradle Mountain Run
- The three Australian Ironman Triathlon events

His best marathon time is 2:42:48, in the 2017 Tokyo Marathon, and he has run all six marathon majors in under three hours. Leigh's best Ironman time is 10:48:11 in the 2021 Cairns Ironman.

In an article in Men's Health, he described his favourite running routes in each Australian capital city. Leigh races as a supporter of the Indigenous Marathon Foundation. Leigh discusses the role of sport in his life in his book Fair Game: Lessons from Sport for a Fairer Society and a Stronger Economy.

== Personal life ==
Leigh is married to Gweneth Leigh, a landscape architect. As of 2024, they have been married for 20 years. Leigh met Gweneth during his time at Harvard University. They live in Canberra with their three sons, Sebastian, Theodore and Zachary. He has said that "both parenting and politics should be done with a sense of kindness".

Leigh is close friends with Justin Wolfers, a professor of economics at University of Michigan, and his wife Betsey Stevenson, the Obama administration’s key economic adviser.

In 2015, Leigh's family Christmas card went viral for his scowling toddler. Speaking of the Christmas card in 2019, Leigh said, "people didn’t want to see airbrushed politics; they preferred to know that our kids were just as grumpy as everyone else’s". Leigh appeared on America's Today Show to discuss the photograph.

== Bibliography ==
=== Books ===
- Leigh, Andrew & David Burchell, eds. (2002). The prince's new clothes : why do Australians dislike their politicians. University of NSW Press. ISBN 978-0-86840-604-6.
- —; Magregor Duncan; David Madden & Peter Tynan (2004). Imagining Australia : ideas for our future. Allen & Unwin. ISBN 978-1-74114-382-9.
- — (2010). Disconnected. University of NSW Press. ISBN 978-1-74223-153-2.
- — (2013). Battlers and billionaires : the story of inequality in Australia. Black Inc. ISBN 978-1-86395-607-9.
- — (2014). The economics of just about everything: the hidden reasons for our curious choices and surprising successes. Allen & Unwin. ISBN 978-1-74331-471-5.
- — (2015). The luck of politics. Black Inc. ISBN 9781863957557.
- — (2017). Choosing openness : why global engagement is best for Australia. Penguin. ISBN 9780143788317.
- — (2018). Randomistas. Black Inc. ISBN 9781863959711.
- — & Joshua Gans (2019). Innovation + equality : how to create a future that is more Star Trek than Terminator. MIT Press. ISBN 9780262043229.
- — & Nick Terrell (2020). Reconnected : a community builder's handbook. Black Inc. ISBN 9781760642617.
- — (2021). What's the worst that could happen? Existential risk and extreme politics. The MIT Press. ISBN 9780262046077.
- — (2022). Fair game : lessons from sport for a fairer society and a stronger economy. Monash Publishing. ISBN 9781922633477.
- — (2024). The Shortest History of Economics. Old Street Publishing. ISBN 9781913083496.
- — (2024). Battlers and Billionaires: The Updated Story of Inequality in Australia. Black Inc. ISBN 9781760645243.
- — (2024). How Economics Explains the World: A Short History of Humanity. Mariner Books. ISBN 9780063383784.
- — (17 February 2026). The Shortest History of Innovation. Black Inc. ISBN 9781760645533.

=== Critical studies and reviews of Leigh's work ===
Reconnected

- Mares, Peter (January–February 2021). "Bucking the loneliness trend : addressing social fragmentation". Australian Book Review. 428: 61.

Parliament of Australia
Preceded by Bob McMullan	Member for Fraser; 2010–2016	Abolished
New seat	Member for Fenner; 2016–present	Incumbent
