= Results of the 1990 Australian federal election in territories =

This is a list of electoral division results for the Australian 1990 federal election for the Australian Capital Territory and the Northern Territory.

== Australian Capital Territory ==
1990 Australian federal election (Australian Capital Territory)
- 1 December 1990

Both Australian Capital Territory seats in the Australian House of Representatives and both seats in the Australian Senate
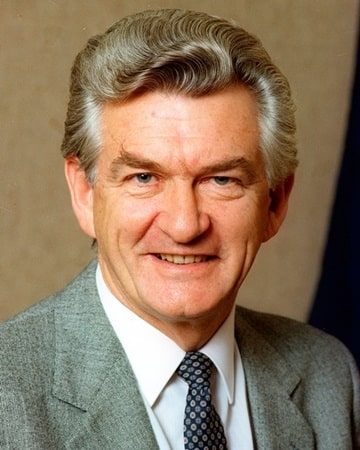

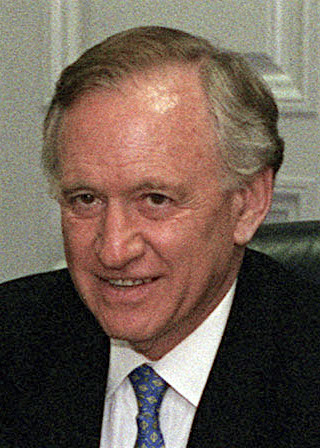
	First party	Second party
Leader	Bob Hawke	Andrew Peacock
Party	Labor	Coalition
Last election	2 seats	0 seats
Seats won	2	0
Seat change	Steady	Steady
Popular vote	71,830	55,755
Percentage	44.88%	34.83%
Swing	▼9.04	▲4.55
TPP	58.54%	41.46%
TPP swing	▼4.71	▲4.71

Turnout 94.1% (CV) — Informal 2.9%
Party	Votes	%	Swing	Seats	Change
Labor	71,830	44.88	-9.04	2	Steady
Liberal	55,755	34.83	4.55		Steady
Democrats	23,091	14.43	7.59		
Green Democratic	6,069	3.79	0.00		
Nuclear Disarmament	2,368	1.48	-3.19		
Independent	949	0.59	-0.96		
Total	160,062			2	
Two-party-preferred vote
Labor	93,498	58.54	-4.71	2	Steady
Liberal	66,206	41.46	4.71	0	Steady
Invalid/blank votes	4,871	2.95	-0.53		
Turnout	164,933	95.78			
Registered voters	172,200				
Source: Psephos Adam Carr's Election Archive 1990

=== Canberra ===
1990 Australian federal election: Canberra
Party	Candidate	Votes	%	±%
Labor	Ros Kelly	35,286	43.8	−01.1
Liberal	Bill Mackey	31,009	38.5	+6.8
Democrats	Julie McCarron-Benson	10,215	12.7	+6.2
Green Democratic	Gina Jeffrey	2,856	3.5	+3.5
Nuclear Disarmament	Barbara Meyer	1,183	1.5	−2.7
Total formal votes		80,549	97.4	
Informal votes		2,191	2.6	
Turnout		82,740	95.9	
Two-party-preferred result
Labor	Ros Kelly	44,872	55.8	−6.2
Liberal	Bill Mackey	35,529	44.2	+6.2
Labor hold		Swing	−6.2	

=== Fraser ===
1990 Australian federal election: Fraser
Party	Candidate	Votes	%	±%
Labor	John Langmore	36,544	46.0	−8.0
Liberal	Sandie Brooke	24,746	31.1	+2.2
Democrats	Heather Jeffcoat	12,876	16.2	+9.0
Green Democratic	Sue Bolton	3,213	4.0	+4.0
Nuclear Disarmament	Gareth Smith	1,185	1.5	−3.6
Independent	Emile Brunoro	949	1.2	+0.6
Total formal votes		79,513	96.7	
Informal votes		2,680	3.3	
Turnout		82,193	95.6	
Two-party-preferred result
Labor	John Langmore	48,626	61.3	−3.2
Liberal	Sandie Brooke	30,677	38.7	+3.2
Labor hold		Swing	−3.2	

== Northern Territory ==
1990 Australian federal election (Northern Territory)
- 1 December 1990

The one Northern Territory seat in the Australian House of Representatives and both seats in the Australian Senate
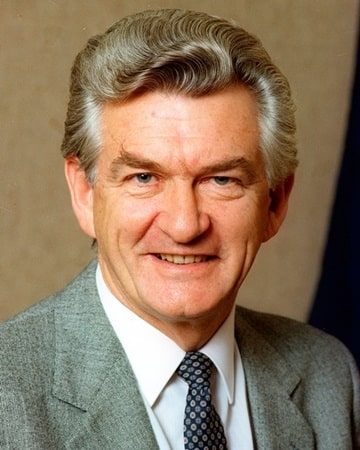

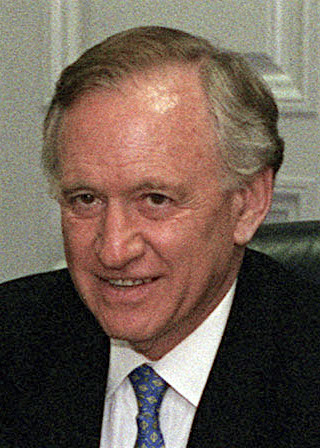
	First party	Second party
Leader	Bob Hawke	Andrew Peacock
Party	Labor	Coalition
Last election	1 seat	0 seats
Seats won	1	0
Seat change	Steady	Steady
Popular vote	34,106	27,668
Percentage	50.0%	40.5%
Swing	▲3.1	▲4.5
TPP	55.0%	45.0%
TPP swing	▲2.8	▼2.8

=== Northern Territory ===
1990 Australian federal election: Northern Territory
Party	Candidate	Votes	%	±%
Labor	Warren Snowdon	34,106	50.0	+3.1
Country Liberal	Helen Galton	27,668	40.5	+4.5
Independent	Don Beaton	1,900	2.8	+2.8
Independent	Bob Liddle	1,427	2.1	+2.1
Independent	Tig Donnellan	1,380	2.0	+2.0
Independent	Strider	975	1.4	+1.4
Independent	Ron Sterry	801	1.2	+1.2
Total formal votes		68,257	96.6	
Informal votes		2,387	3.4	
Turnout		70,644	89.4	
Two-party-preferred result
Labor	Warren Snowdon	37,498	55.0	+2.8
Country Liberal	Helen Galton	30,650	45.0	−2.8
Labor hold		Swing	+2.8	

== See also ==
- Results of the 1990 Australian federal election (House of Representatives)
- Members of the Australian House of Representatives, 1990–1993
