= Electoral results for the Division of Fraser (Victoria) =

Australian division election results

This is a list of electoral results for the Division of Fraser in Australian federal elections from the division's creation in 2019 until the present.

== Members ==
Member	Party	Term
Daniel Mulino	Labor	2019–present

== Election results ==
=== Elections in the 2020s ===
==== 2025 ====
2025 Australian federal election: Fraser
Party	Candidate	Votes	%	±%
Family First	Rob Rancie			
Greens	Huong Truong			
One Nation	George Rozario			
Liberal	Satish Patel			
Victorian Socialists	Jasmine Duff			
Labor	Daniel Mulino			
Total formal votes				
Informal votes				
Turnout				

==== 2022 ====
2022 Australian federal election: Fraser
Party	Candidate	Votes	%	±%
Labor	Daniel Mulino	38,732	42.05	−8.73
Liberal	David Wood	22,730	24.68	+0.73
Greens	Bella Mitchell-Sears	17,078	18.54	+4.66
Victorian Socialists	Catherine Robertson	4,429	4.81	+4.81
United Australia	Keith Raymond	4,088	4.44	−2.05
One Nation	Sabine de Pyle	2,695	2.93	+2.93
Liberal Democrats	Anthony Cursio	2,349	2.55	+2.55
Total formal votes		92,101	95.58	+0.39
Informal votes		4,258	4.42	−0.39
Turnout		96,359	86.84	−3.26
Two-party-preferred result
Labor	Daniel Mulino	61,251	66.50	−1.55
Liberal	David Wood	30,850	33.50	+1.55
Labor hold		Swing	−1.55	

Alluvial diagram for preference flows in the seat of Fraser in the 2022 federal election. indicates at what stage the winning candidate had over 50% of the votes and was declared the winner.

=== Elections in the 2010s ===
==== 2019 ====
2019 Australian federal election: Fraser
Party	Candidate	Votes	%	±%
Labor	Daniel Mulino	46,709	50.46	−8.05
Liberal	Peter Bain	23,929	25.85	+0.47
Greens	Rebecca Scorgie	7,645	8.26	−1.50
United Australia	Vinh Van Chau	7,314	7.90	+7.90
Independent	Van Tran	5,306	5.73	+4.25
Great Australian	Tony Dobran	1,656	1.79	+1.79
Total formal votes		92,559	93.87	−0.48
Informal votes		6,046	6.13	+0.48
Turnout		98,605	90.13	+1.25
Two-party-preferred result
Labor	Daniel Mulino	59,403	64.18	−5.61
Liberal	Peter Bain	33,156	35.82	+5.61
Labor notional hold		Swing	−5.61	

Fraser was a new seat as a result of the 2018 boundary redistribution and was notionally held by Labor with a margin of 19.79%.
