= Ken Fry =

Australian politician

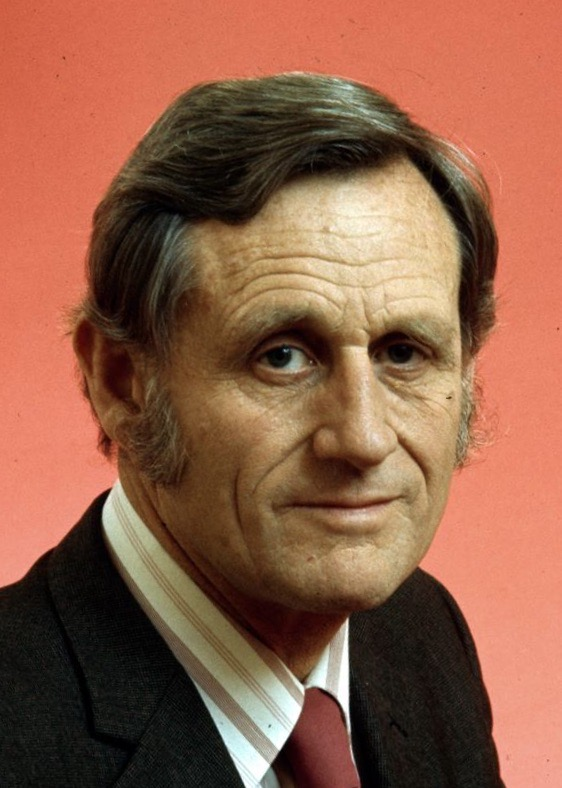

Member of the Australian Parliament for Fraser
- In office 18 May 1974 – 26 October 1984
- Preceded by: New seat
- Succeeded by: John Langmore

Personal details
- Born: 8 November 1920 Inverell, New South Wales
- Died: 10 October 2007 (aged 86) Broulee, New South Wales
- Party: ACT Community Party (1989)
- Other political affiliations: Australian Labor Party (until 1989)
- Spouse: Audrey Clibbens
- Children: 1 son, 2 daughters
- Education: Hawkesbury Agricultural College 1938; Australian National University 1973, 1981, 1993
- Occupation: Farmer, business owner

Kenneth Lionel Fry (8 November 1920 – 10 October 2007) was a Member of the Australian House of Representatives representing Fraser, Australian Capital Territory for the Australian Labor Party, from 1974 to 1984.

== Early years ==
Fry was born in Inverell, New South Wales, the youngest of seven children, and spent many of his early years around Bathurst. He completed a diploma at the Hawkesbury Agricultural College in 1938. During World War II, he served in the Second Australian Imperial Force from 1939 to 1945, including service in New Guinea, Borneo and South East Asia. He married Audrey Clibbens in 1946 and then worked in business and farming in the Bathurst district from 1947 to 1967. He joined the Australian Public Service in 1968 as an agricultural officer. He completed a BA at the Australian National University (ANU) in 1973 and a BLitt in 1981.

== Political career ==
Fry was a member of the Australian Capital Territory Advisory Council from 1970 to 1974. In 1973, he was elected as the first president of the Australian Capital Territory branch of the Labor Party. In 1974 he was elected as the first member for Fraser. From 1975, he became particularly involved in the campaign for the independence of East Timor. Subsequently, Fry addressed three international bodies on this issue: the UN Security Council in April 1976, the international conference on East Timor in Lisbon in May 1979 and the Permanent Peoples Tribunal hearing on East Timor in Lisbon in 1981. Fry retired from politics in 1984.

== Life after politics ==
After retiring from Parliament, Fry returned initially to study, completing his PhD in Australian history under the guidance of Professor Manning Clark at ANU. Fry and his wife later retired to the South Coast of New South Wales.

Parliament of Australia
Preceded by New	Member for Fraser; 1974–1984	Succeeded by John Langmore
