= 1996 Blaxland by-election =

← Mar. 1996	15 June 1996	1998 →

Division of Blaxland (New South Wales) in the House of Representatives
	First party	Second party	Third party
		AAFI	RARI
Candidate	Michael Hatton	Peter John Krumins	John Hutchinson
Party	Labor	AAFI	Reclaim Australia
Primary vote	37,804	8,759	5,771
Percentage	58.83%	13.63%	8.98%
Swing	▲0.12	▲10.88	▲8.98
TPP	69.06%		30.94%
TPP swing	▲6.08		▲30.94
MP before election
Paul Keating
Labor
Elected MP
Michael Hatton
Labor

The 1996 Blaxland by-election was held in the Australian electorate of Blaxland in New South Wales on 15 June 1996. The by-election was triggered by the resignation of the sitting member, the Australian Labor Party's Paul Keating on 23 April 1996. The writ for the by-election was issued on 13 May 1996.

== Background ==
Blaxland had been held since 1969 by Paul Keating, who had been Treasurer under Bob Hawke from 1983, until he defeated Hawke in a leadership challenge in December 1991, becoming Prime Minister of Australia. Keating went on to defeat John Hewson at the 1993 election, but three years later the ALP was defeated in a landslide victory by a resurgent Coalition led by John Howard at the 1996 election on 2 March. Following the party's election loss, Keating immediately resigned as party leader, and several weeks later, resigned from the Parliament.

== Results ==
1996 Blaxland by-election
Party	Candidate	Votes	%	±%
Labor	Michael Hatton	37,804	58.83	+0.12
AAFI	Peter John Krumins	8,759	13.63	+10.88
Reclaim Australia	John Hutchinson	5,771	8.98	+8.98
Greens	Vicki Kearney	3,148	4.90	+4.90
Call to Australia	Melodie Rahme	2,782	4.33	+4.16
Independent	Peter Sayegh	2,334	3.63	+2.65
Independent	Neil Baird	1,499	2.33	+2.33
Independent	Bob Reid	750	1.17	+1.17
Anti-Super League	Adam Spencer	499	0.78	+0.78
	Marnie Kennedy	388	0.60	+0.60
Independent	Marc Aussie-Stone	298	0.46	+0.11
Natural Law	Linda Cogger	224	0.35	+0.10
Total formal votes		64,256	92.66	−0.72
Informal votes		5,092	7.34	+0.72
Turnout		69,348	87.00	−9.06
Two-candidate-preferred result
Labor	Michael Hatton	44,188	69.06	+6.08
Reclaim Australia	John Hutchinson	19,800	30.94	+30.94
Labor hold		Swing	N/A	

== Aftermath ==
The Australian Labor Party retained the seat with an increased majority, with Michael Hatton as their candidate. The Liberal Party of Australia declined to run a candidate, and this saw a rise in the vote for two minor anti-immigration parties: Australians Against Further Immigration and Reclaim Australia: Reduce Immigration, which came second and third in the popular vote. On a two-party preferred basis, RARI gained their best ever result in an election, gaining over 30% of the vote on preferences.

== See also ==
- List of Australian federal by-elections
