= David Burchell =

Australian journalist

David Burchell is a senior lecturer in humanities at the University of Western Sydney and a regular columnist for The Australian. He has also contributed articles to the Australian Financial Review and Griffith Review.

Burchell is the author of several books on Australian politics and the Australian Labor Party, including Western Horizon: Sydney's Heartland and the Future of Australian Politics (Scribe Books, 2003); co-author of The Prince's New Clothes: Why do Australians Dislike Their Politicians? (UNSW Press, 2002); and Labor's Troubled Times (Pluto Press, 1991).

Burchell was also a regular contributor to Counterpoint, a weekly ABC radio program (discontinued) and enduring podcast from Radio National, hosted in its final years by Amanda Vanstone.
