= Eli Harrison =

Australian politician (1903–1976)

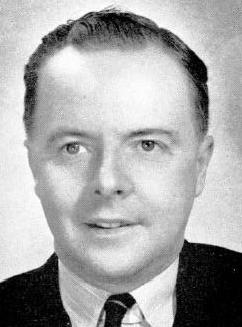
- Harrison c. 1950

Member of the Australian Parliament for Blaxland
- In office 10 December 1949 – 29 September 1969
- Preceded by: New seat
- Succeeded by: Paul Keating

Personal details
- Born: Eli James Harrison; 12 October 1903 Port Macquarie, New South Wales, Australia
- Died: 9 September 1976 (aged 72) North Melbourne, Australia
- Party: Labor
- Children: 2
- Occupation: Railway worker - Fireman to Ben Chifley on 50 class locomotive 5112
- Profession: Politician

Eli James Harrison (12 October 1903 – 9 September 1976) was an Australian politician. Born in Port Macquarie to farmer William Binney and Sophia Selina Turnbull, he was educated at state schools. He then worked on a dairy farm before joining New South Wales Government Railways in 1925. He was an official of the Australian Federated Union of Locomotive Enginemen from 1930 to 1949, and was its president in 1948. He was active in local Labor Party politics, and was elected to the New South Wales Legislative Council in 1943. He held that position until 1949, when he transferred to federal politics, defeating former premier Jack Lang for the new seat of Blaxland. He held the seat until his retirement in 1969. He first married Una Grace May Brown at Pleasant Plains, near Port Macquarie, on 15 October 1924, three days after reaching adulthood. This marriage was dissolved on 6 July 1968. He subsequently married Joyce Ethel McGovern on 7 September 1975 at North Melbourne, but died the following year.

Parliament of Australia
Preceded by New seat	Member for Blaxland; 1949 – 1969	Succeeded by Paul Keating
