= Kenneth Fry (cricketer) =

English cricketer

Kenneth Robert Burgess Fry (15 March 1883 – 21 June 1949) was an English cricketer who played for the Sussex County Cricket Club and Cambridge University between 1901 and 1904. He was born in Surat, British India and died in Chelsea, London. He appeared in 26 first-class matches as a right-handed batsman who sometimes kept wicket. He scored 1,036 runs with a highest score of 129 and completed 15 catches with two stumpings.
