= Hawkesbury Agricultural College =

Agricultural school of the University of Western Sydney

Coordinates: 33°37′S 150°45′E

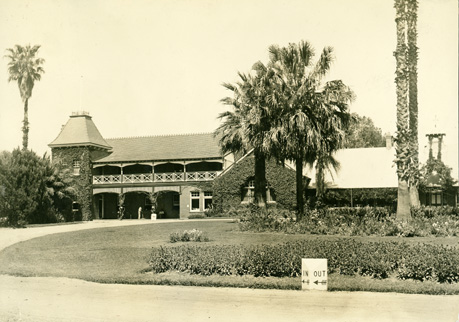

Hawkesbury Agricultural College was the first agricultural college in New South Wales, Australia, based in Richmond. It operated from 1891 to 1989.

== History ==
It was established on 10 March 1891, and formally opened by Minister for Mines and Agriculture Sydney Smith on 16 March.

The college initially operated out of two historic residences in Richmond, "Toxana" and "Andrew Towns House", with construction of the campus buildings beginning from 1895. Two central campus precincts, the Quadrangle (the initial teaching area) and Stable Square (the initial base for student practical work), both date from this initial 1890s phase of construction. Stable Square, now the main student recreation and support facility, was designed by Walter Liberty Vernon; it was completed in 1895, burned down in April 1896, and was then rebuilt.

The college was operated by the state Department of Agriculture. Initially offering a two-year full-time residential course in general agriculture, it expanded to three years in 1910, after which time the course became known as the Hawkesbury Diploma in Agriculture. A dairying diploma was also introduced in 1910.

Lorna Byrne, who was one of the first two women to graduate in agricultural science from the University of Sydney in 1921, had part of her practical training here. The first female students admitted to this college was in 1971 when the college began relaxing requirements that students reside on campus. It became a College of Advanced Education from 1 January 1972. It continued to be operated by the Department of Agriculture until 1976, after which time it became autonomous with its own governing council.

It operated a separate residential campus at Scheyville, using the former Officer Training Unit, Scheyville buildings, from 1977 to 1983. It was solely residential, with all teaching remaining at the Richmond campus, and the college opted to consolidate all operations there at the conclusion of its five-year lease.

Notable faculty included George Lowe Sutton and E. A. Southee (principal 1921–1954), while notable students included the broadcaster Lorna Byrne and Walter Lawry Waterhouse.

In 1985, Premier Neville Wran initiated a Higher Education Board inquiry into higher education in Western Sydney, headed by Ron Parry. The report recommended the amalgamation of the Hawkesbury Agricultural College and the Nepean College of Advanced Education to form a new university. The state government gave effect to the report's recommendations in the University of Western Sydney Act 1988, and the college formally amalgamated into the new University of Western Sydney from 1 January 1989. It thereafter became the university's Hawkesbury campus.
