= Division of Fraser (Australian Capital Territory) =

Former Australian federal electoral division

Coordinates: 35.236°S 149.111°E

Fraser Australian House of Representatives Division
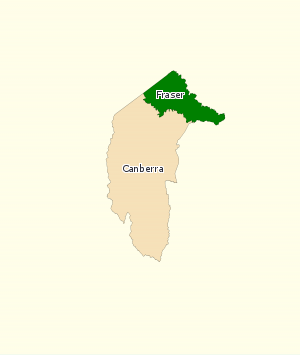
- Created: 1974
- Abolished: 2016 (replaced by the Division of Fenner)
- Party: Labor (1974–2016)
- Namesake: Jim Fraser
- Electors: 138,047 (2013)
- Area: 513 km^{2} (198.1 sq mi)
- Demographic: Inner metropolitan

The Division of Fraser was an Australian electoral division in the Australian Capital Territory and the Jervis Bay Territory which existed from 1974 to 2016. For the entirety of its existence it was held by the Labor Party.

== History ==
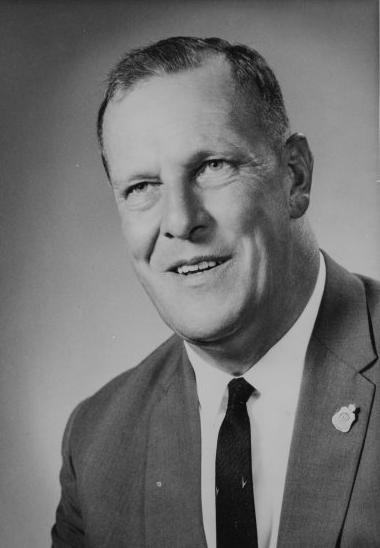
Jim Fraser, the division's namesake

The division was created in a redistribution of the former Division of Australian Capital Territory, gazetted on 19 April 1974. It was named for Jim Fraser, who was the Member for Australian Capital Territory from 1951 to 1970.

It encompassed the northern suburbs of Canberra, including the districts of Belconnen, Gungahlin, North Canberra and also the Jervis Bay Territory. It also generally included the land in the ACT north of the Molonglo River and Lake Burley Griffin, although at one time it included some suburbs in the inner south and immediately prior to its abolition it had lost Reid and Campbell to the division of Canberra. It was always a safe seat for the Australian Labor Party.

The Australian Electoral Commission decided that, with effect from the 2016 election, the seat name would be changed to Fenner, to honour scientist Frank Fenner. The name change was due to plans by the AEC to name a seat in Victoria after former prime minister Malcolm Fraser. The proposed name change met with opposition from a number of ACT residents. For instance, former ACT Chief Minister Jon Stanhope said that the name change "traduces" the legacy of Fraser, a man "close to the heart of Canberrans." He also claimed that Fenner himself would have objected to the proposal.

== Members ==
Image	Member	Party	Term	Notes
	Ken Fry (1920–2007)	Labor	18 May 1974 – 26 October 1984	Previously a member of the Australian Capital Territory Advisory Council. Retired
	John Langmore (1939–)	Labor	1 December 1984 – 6 December 1996	Resigned to retire from politics
	Steve Dargavel (1966–)	Labor	1 February 1997 – 31 August 1998	Lost preselection and retired
	Bob McMullan (1947–)	Labor	3 October 1998 – 19 July 2010	Previously held the Division of Canberra. Retired
	Andrew Leigh (1972–)	Labor	21 August 2010 – 2 July 2016	Transferred to the Division of Fenner after Fraser was abolished in 2016

== Election results ==
2013 Australian federal election: Fraser
Party	Candidate	Votes	%	±%
Labor	Andrew Leigh	56,063	44.66	−1.15
Liberal	Elizabeth Lee	39,693	31.62	−0.79
Greens	Adam Verwey	17,665	14.07	−5.77
Bullet Train	Sam Huggins	5,099	4.06	+4.06
Palmer United	Freddy Alcazar	3,063	2.44	+2.44
Democrats	Darren Churchill	2,444	1.95	+1.95
Rise Up Australia	Jill Ross	1,508	1.20	+1.20
Total formal votes		125,535	96.27	+0.70
Informal votes		4,859	3.73	−0.70
Turnout		130,394	94.46	+0.07
Two-party-preferred result
Labor	Andrew Leigh	78,614	62.62	−1.58
Liberal	Elizabeth Lee	46,921	37.38	+1.58
Labor hold		Swing	−1.58	
