= Michael Hatton =

Australian politician (born 1951)

Member of the Australian Parliament for Blaxland
- In office 15 June 1996 – 17 October 2007
- Preceded by: Paul Keating
- Succeeded by: Jason Clare

Personal details
- Born: 28 August 1951 (age 75) Sydney, Australia
- Party: Labor
- Education: University of New South Wales
- Occupation: School teacher
- Profession: Politician

Michael John Hatton (born 28 August 1951, in Sydney, Australia) is an Australian former politician who served as the Australian Labor Party member of the House of Representatives from June 1996 to October 2007, representing the Division of Blaxland, New South Wales.

== Background and career ==
He was educated at the University of New South Wales. He was a school teacher before entering politics. From 1985 to 1996, he was an electorate officer for his predecessor as MP for Blaxland, Paul Keating (Prime Minister 1991–1996). He entered parliament at a by-election necessitated by Keating's resignation from parliament after he lost the 1996 election to John Howard.

In May 2007, he lost party preselection and retired at the 2007 federal election which had seen his party return to power. This meant that the entirety of his parliamentary career equated to the entirety of his party's time in Opposition.

Parliament of Australia
Preceded by Paul Keating	Member for Blaxland; 1996–2007	Succeeded by Jason Clare
