= Bob McMullan =

Australian politician (born 1947)

The Honourable Bob McMullan
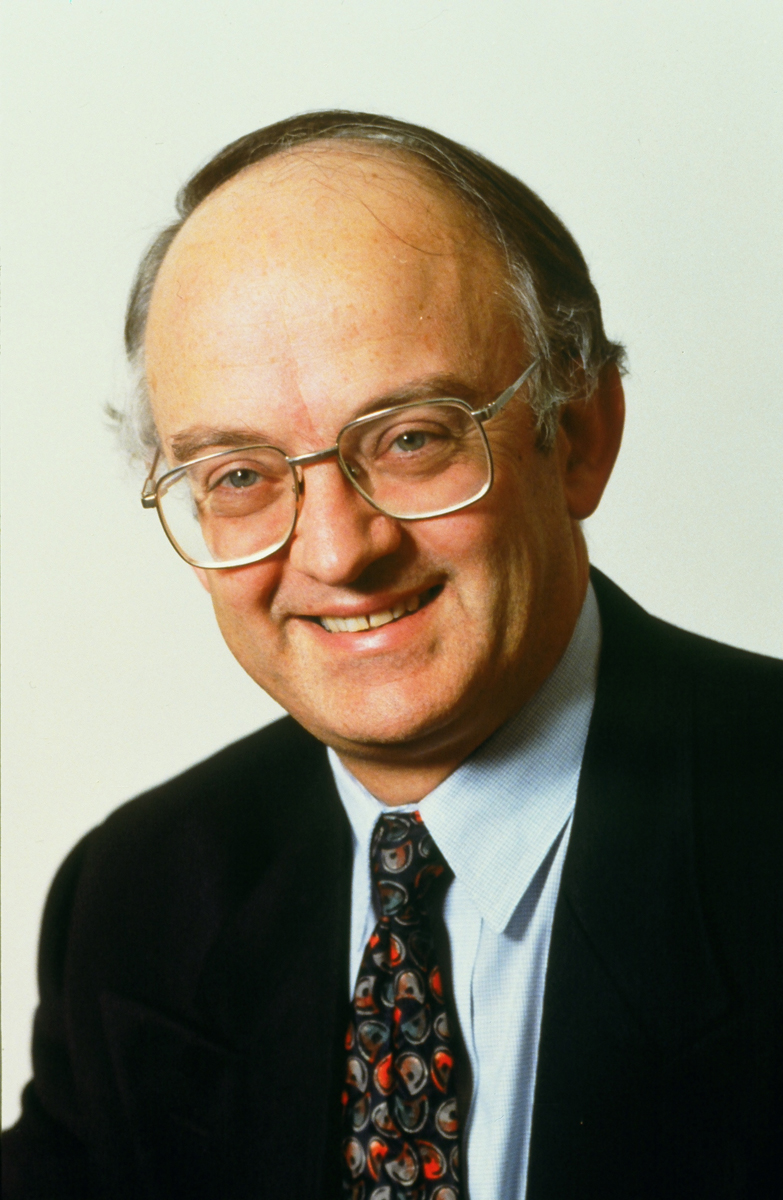

Manager of Opposition Business
- In office 20 October 1998 – 25 November 2001
- Leader: Kim Beazley
- Preceded by: Simon Crean
- Succeeded by: Wayne Swan

Minister for Trade
- In office 30 January 1994 – 11 March 1996
- Prime Minister: Paul Keating
- Preceded by: Peter Cook
- Succeeded by: Tim Fischer

Minister for the Arts
- In office 24 March 1993 – 30 January 1994
- Prime Minister: Paul Keating
- Preceded by: Ros Kelly
- Succeeded by: Michael Lee

Minister for Administrative Services
- In office 24 March 1993 – 25 March 1994
- Prime Minister: Paul Keating
- Preceded by: Nick Bolkus
- Succeeded by: Frank Walker

Member of the Australian Parliament for Fraser
- In office 3 October 1998 – 19 July 2010
- Preceded by: Steve Dargavel
- Succeeded by: Andrew Leigh

Member of the Australian Parliament for Canberra
- In office 2 March 1996 – 3 October 1998
- Preceded by: Brendan Smyth
- Succeeded by: Annette Ellis

Senator for the Australian Capital Territory
- In office 16 February 1988 – 6 February 1996
- Preceded by: Susan Ryan
- Succeeded by: Kate Lundy

National Secretary of the Australian Labor Party
- In office 28 July 1981 – 7 April 1988
- Preceded by: David Combe
- Succeeded by: Bob Hogg

Personal details
- Born: 10 December 1947 (age 78) Perth, Western Australia
- Party: Labor
- Education: University of Western Australia
- Occupation: Politician

Robert Francis McMullan (born 10 December 1947) is a former Australian politician. A member of the Australian Labor Party (ALP), he was a cabinet minister in the Keating government as Minister for Arts and Administrative Services (1993–1994) and Minister for Trade (1994–1996). He was a member of federal parliament for over 22 years, initially as a Senator for the Australian Capital Territory from 1988 to 1996 and then as a member of the House of Representatives from 1996 to 2010. Prior to entering parliament he was state secretary of the ALP in Western Australia from 1975 to 1981 and national secretary from 1981 to 1988.

== Early life ==
McMullan was born in Perth on 10 December 1947. He attended Guildford Primary School and Governor Stirling Senior High School. He was raised in a working-class family; his older brothers left school prematurely to support the family, but he was able to continue to Year 12 after receiving a state government bursary.

McMullan graduated from the University of Western Australia with a Bachelor of Arts in economics and a Bachelor of Economics in industrial relations. He was the first member of his family to attend university. He was active in the movement against the Vietnam War and was conscripted for military service in 1968 but successfully argued in court that he was a conscientious objector. After university he tutored in industrial relations and worked as a freelance industrial advocate from 1971 to 1973.

== Early political involvement ==
McMullan joined the Australian Labor Party in 1967 while at university. Active in student politics, he was elected to the ALP state executive the following year and in 1971 became the state president of Young Labor.

McMullan was appointed state secretary of the Western Australian branch of the ALP in 1975. He was elected national secretary in 1981, and moved to Canberra. His tenure included the ALP's victory at the 1983, 1984 and 1987 federal elections. In December 1987 he announced he would seek ALP preselection to fill the casual vacancy caused by Susan Ryan's resignation from the Senate.

== Parliamentary career ==
On 16 February 1988, McMullan was chosen by a joint sitting of the House of Representatives and the Senate to fill a casual vacancy in the representation of the Australian Capital Territory in the Senate, caused by the resignation of Susan Ryan. This was the second (and last) time that a territory senate vacancy was filled in this way.

McMullan was Parliamentary Secretary to the Treasurer 1990–93, Minister for the Arts and Minister for Administrative Services 1993–94, Minister for Administrative Services 1994 and Minister for Trade 1994–96 in the government of Paul Keating.

As Arts Minister he was shadowed by Opposition leader John Hewson who had appointed himself as Shadow Arts Minister.

On 6 February 1996 he resigned his Senate seat in order to contest the Division of Canberra in the House of Representatives at the March election; he was successful. He was the first person to represent the Australian Capital Territory in both houses of federal parliament. The Keating government having been defeated by John Howard, Labor went into opposition and McMullan was elected as a member of the Opposition Shadow Ministry. In 1998, following a redistribution, McMullan moved to the neighbouring seat of Fraser.

McMullan became Manager of Opposition Business (opposite number to the Leader of the House) in 1998, and following Labor's 2001 electoral defeat he was made Shadow Treasurer. In July 2003 McMullan was replaced as Shadow Treasurer by Mark Latham and relegated to the post of Shadow Minister for Finance, taking on additional responsibility for Reconciliation and Indigenous Affairs. McMullan then became Shadow Minister for Finance and Shadow Minister for Small Business.

In Question Time in Parliament, McMullan gained a reputation for repeatedly asking the same question in different words if he did not get a direct answer. After the 2004 election, McMullan did not stand for election to the Shadow Cabinet, in what was widely seen as an expression of lack of confidence in the leadership of Mark Latham.

Following the election of Kevin Rudd on 4 December 2006 as Opposition Leader in place of Kim Beazley, McMullan returned to the front bench in the junior role of Labor spokesperson on Federal-State Relations, the reform of which was one of Rudd's declared priorities.

In the 2007 federal election McMullan held his seat of Fraser, albeit with a two-party preferred swing to Labor of less than 2%, one-third of the national average swing to Labor.

When the First Rudd Ministry was sworn in on 3 December 2007, McMullan was given the junior post of Parliamentary Secretary for International Development Assistance. On 19 January 2010, McMullan announced he would not contest the next federal election. He retired prior to the 2010 federal election.

Political offices
Preceded by Ros Kelly	Minister for the Arts; 1993–1994	Succeeded by Michael Lee
Preceded by Nick Bolkus	Minister for Administrative Services; 1994	Succeeded by Frank Walker
Preceded by Peter Cook	Minister for Trade; 1994–1996	Succeeded by Tim Fischer
Parliament of Australia
Preceded by Susan Ryan	Senator for the Australian Capital Territory; 1988–1996; Served alongside: Margaret Reid	Succeeded by Kate Lundy
Preceded by Brendan Smyth	Member for Canberra; 1996–1998	Succeeded by Annette Ellis
Preceded by Steve Dargavel	Member for Fraser; 1998–2010	Succeeded by Andrew Leigh
Party political offices
Preceded by David Combe	National Secretary of the Australian Labor Party; 1981-1988	Succeeded by Bob Hogg
