= Steve Dargavel =

Australian politician

Member of the Australian Parliament for Fraser
- In office 1 February 1997 – 31 August 1998
- Preceded by: John Langmore
- Succeeded by: Bob McMullan

Personal details
- Born: 10 June 1966 (age 60) Traralgon, Victoria
- Party: Australian Labor Party
- Education: Monash University

Steven John Dargavel (born 10 June 1966) is a former Australian politician.

Dargavel was born in Traralgon, Victoria and received an Associate Diploma in Welfare Studies from Monash University. He then worked as a youth refuge worker, youth housing worker and employment counsellor. He then became a research officer and, from 1996, an organiser for the Australian Manufacturing Workers Union.

Dargavel won a by-election in 1997 as the Australian Labor Party candidate for the House of Representatives seat of Fraser following the resignation of John Langmore to take up a position in the United Nations. He was beaten for preselection for the seat for the 1998 election by Bob McMullan, when the electorate of Namadgi was abolished, leading to a reshuffling of Labor candidates between the Australian Capital Territory electorates.

== Notes ==
Parliament of Australia
Preceded by John Langmore	Member for Fraser; 1997–1998	Succeeded by Bob McMullan
