= John Langmore =

Australian academic and politician

John Langmore AM

Member of the Australian Parliament for Fraser
- In office 1 December 1984 – 6 December 1996
- Preceded by: Ken Fry
- Succeeded by: Steve Dargavel

Personal details
- Born: 3 September 1939 (age 87)
- Party: Australian Labor Party
- Education: University of Melbourne; Monash University; University of Cambridge
- Occupation: Lecturer

John Vance Langmore AM (born 3 September 1939) is an Australian academic and politician. He was a member of the Australian House of Representatives from 1984 to 1996.

He studied for a Bachelor of Commerce degree at the University of Melbourne, a Master of Economics degree from Monash University, and a Diploma of Developmental Economics from the University of Cambridge. He then worked as a lecturer in economics at the University of Papua New Guinea from 1969 to 1973. He worked for Ralph Willis in 1983 and 1984 when Willis was the Minister for Employment and Industrial Relations under Prime Minister Bob Hawke.

Langmore was an Australian Labor Party (ALP) politician, and member for the Division of Fraser (ACT). He resigned from Parliament on 6 December 1996, and was replaced in a by-election by Steve Dargavel, another ALP politician. He then worked for the United Nations (UN), as the director of the Division for Social Policy and Development in the UN's Department of Economic and Social Affairs from 1997 to 2002, and then as UN representative of the International Labour Organization; at the time of his appointment in 1997, he was the most senior Australian official in the United Nations Secretariat.

He is now a professorial fellow in the Department of Political Science at the University of Melbourne, and a visiting fellow at the University of New England. He is also the president of the United Nations Association of Australia and an Australian board member of the International Campaign to Abolish Nuclear Weapons.

He has published several books on public and international policy. On 22 September 2005, he launched Dealing with America: The UN, the US and Australia (ISBN 0-86840-970-7), which examined the relationships the George W. Bush administration in the United States had with the Australian Howard government, and with the United Nations.

== Books ==
Dealing with America: the UN, the US and Australia, (UNSW Press, Sydney, 2005)

To Firmer Ground: Restoring Hope in Australia, (UNSW Press, Sydney, 2007)

Parliament of Australia
Preceded by Ken Fry	Member for Fraser; 1984–1996	Succeeded by Steve Dargavel
