= Peter Hamilton Bailey =

Australian public servant and academic (1927–2021)

Peter Hamilton Bailey AM OBE
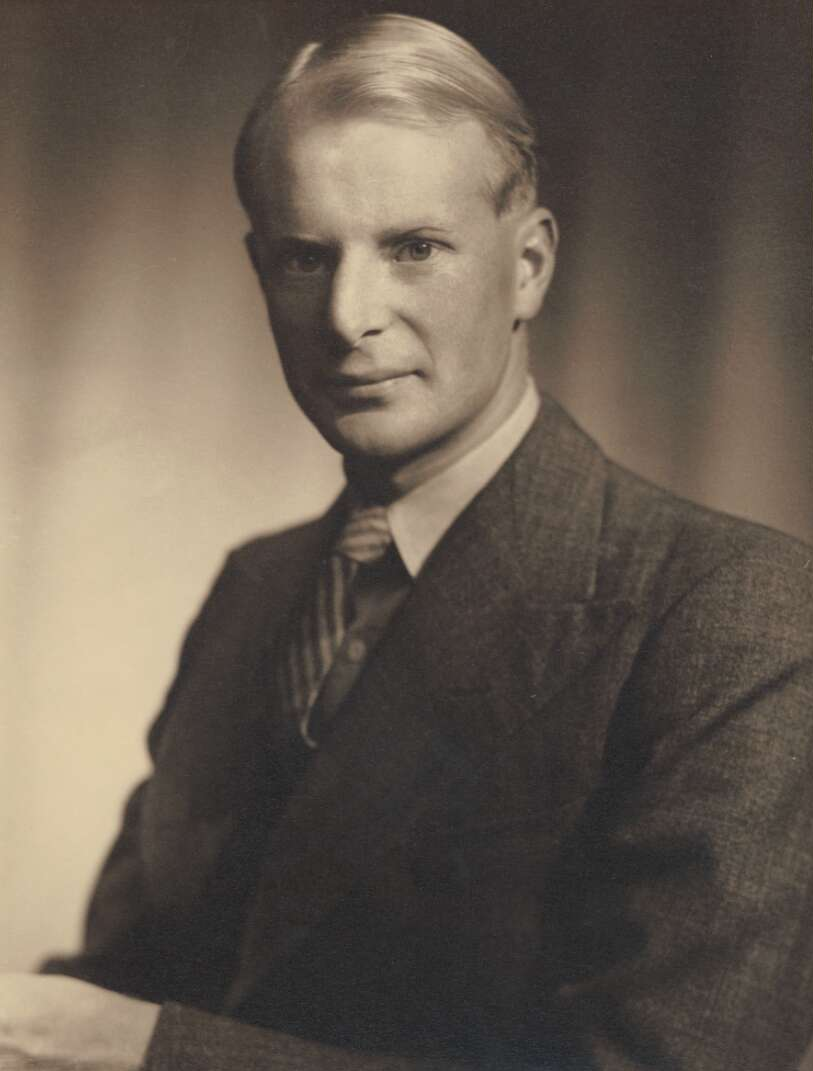
- Peter H. Bailey, ca. 1948
- Born: 3 September 1927; Melbourne, Victoria, Australia
- Died: 7 November 2021 (aged 94)
- Education: Carey Baptist Grammar School; Wesley College
- Alma mater: University of Melbourne (LL.B.); Corpus Christi College, Oxford; Canberra University College (LL.M.)
- Occupations: Public servant, academic
- Years active: 1949–2016
- Parent(s): Editha Bailey (née Donnison; mother); Kenneth Bailey (father)

Peter Hamilton Bailey AM OBE (3 September 1927 – 7 November 2021) was a former Australian civil servant and academic who served as an advisor to seven Australian prime ministers, and later became a professor in human rights law at the Australian National University (ANU).

== Early life ==
Bailey was born in Melbourne to Editha (née Donnison) and Kenneth Bailey. His father served as Solicitor-General of Australia. Bailey attended Carey Baptist Grammar School and Wesley College, and then completed a Bachelor of Laws degree at the University of Melbourne. He won a Rhodes Scholarship in 1949, emulating his father who had been a Rhodes Scholar in 1918. They both attended Corpus Christi College, Oxford. After Oxford, Bailey returned to Australia to complete a Master of Laws degree at Canberra University College.

== Public service ==
Bailey had entered the Commonwealth Public Service in 1946, as an assistant to George Knowles, Secretary of the Attorney-General's Department. He joined the Department in Treasury in 1962, and then the Prime Minister's Department in 1965. The first prime minister Bailey worked under was Robert Menzies, who he described as "the most careful listener and the most effective of the prime ministers I saw". He was most influential during the prime ministership of Harold Holt, who he had first worked under at Treasury. Under Holt, Bailey was given the title of "first assistant secretary" and was in charge of the prime minister's private office. In December 1967, he was given the task of informing Zara Holt of her husband's disappearance.

In 1972, Bailey became deputy secretary of the Department of the Prime Minister and Cabinet in 1972, under John Bunting. He was appointed an Officer of the Order of the British Empire in the 1972 Queen's Birthday Honours. He served on the Royal Commission on Australian Government Administration from 1974 to 1976, under the chairmanship of H. C. Coombs. During the Fraser government, Bailey was tasked with setting up the Australian Human Rights Commission (AHRC). He served as its inaugural CEO and deputy chairman from 1981 to 1986.

== Academia and other areas ==
From 1977 to 1982, Bailey served as chairman of the board of Canberra Grammar School. In 1986, he accepted an offer to join the ANU College of Law as a visiting fellow, teaching human rights law. Bailey was made a Member of the Order of Australia (AM) in the 1998 Australia Day Honours. He became an adjunct professor in 1999. Bailey retired from ANU at the end of 2016, aged 89.
