= Australian Government Solicitor =

Agency and legal officer in the Australian Government

The Australian Government Solicitor (AGS) is an Australian public servant and a federal government agency of the same name which provides legal advice to the federal government and its agencies.

AGS was originally the Crown Solicitor's Office, which was established on 1 July 1903 on the appointment of Charles Powers as the first Commonwealth Crown Solicitor. With a major restructure of the Attorney-General's Department from 1983 to 1984, the Crown Solicitor's Office became the Office of the Australian Government Solicitor, with Crown Solicitor Tom Sherman appointed the first Australian Government Solicitor. Some functions of the Crown Solicitor's Office were transferred to other parts of the Attorney-General's Department. In 1999, the Australian Government Solicitor ceased being an office held by an individual, and instead became a government business enterprise, headed by a CEO, separate from the Attorney-General's Department. On 1 July 2015, AGS was consolidated within the Attorney-General's Department as a functionally independent group under a lawyer titled the Australian Government Solicitor.

Some Commonwealth legal work, including constitutional law, is 'tied' work that only AGS is able to perform as solicitor on behalf of the Commonwealth.

== List of office-holders ==
Individuals who have served as Commonwealth Crown Solicitor, Australian Government Solicitor or CEO of AGS are:

- Charles Powers (1903–1913)
- Gordon Castle (1913–1927)
- William Sharwood (1927–1936)
- Fred Whitlam (1936–1949)
- Keith Cameron Waugh (1949–1951)
- David Bell (1951–1955)
- Harry Renfree (1955–1970)
- Bob Hutchison (1970–1975)
- Alan Neaves (1975–1979)
- Brian O'Donovan (1979–1983)
- Tom Sherman (1983–1989)
- Stephen Skehill (1989–1990)
- John Pyne (1990–1993)
- Dale Boucher (1993–1999)
- Rayne de Gruchy (1999–2010)
- Ian Govey (2010–2016)
- Louise Vardanega (Acting) (2016–2017)
- Michael Kingston (2017–2023)
- Matthew Blunn (2023–present)

== See also ==
- Attorney-General for Australia
- Solicitor-General of Australia
- Treasury Solicitor (Equivalent in the United Kingdom)
