= Results of the 2016 Australian federal election in territories =

== Australian Capital Territory ==
2016 Australian federal election (Australian Capital Territory)
← 2013	2 July 2016	2019 →

All 2 Australian Capital Territory seats in the Australian House of Representatives and all 2 seats in the Australian Senate
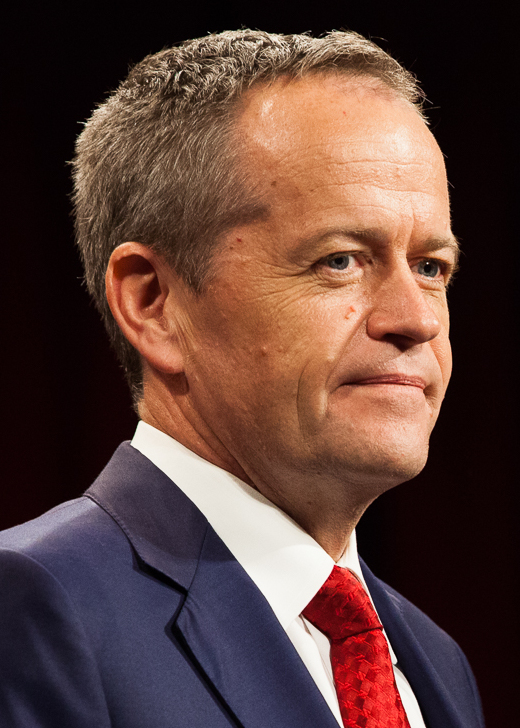

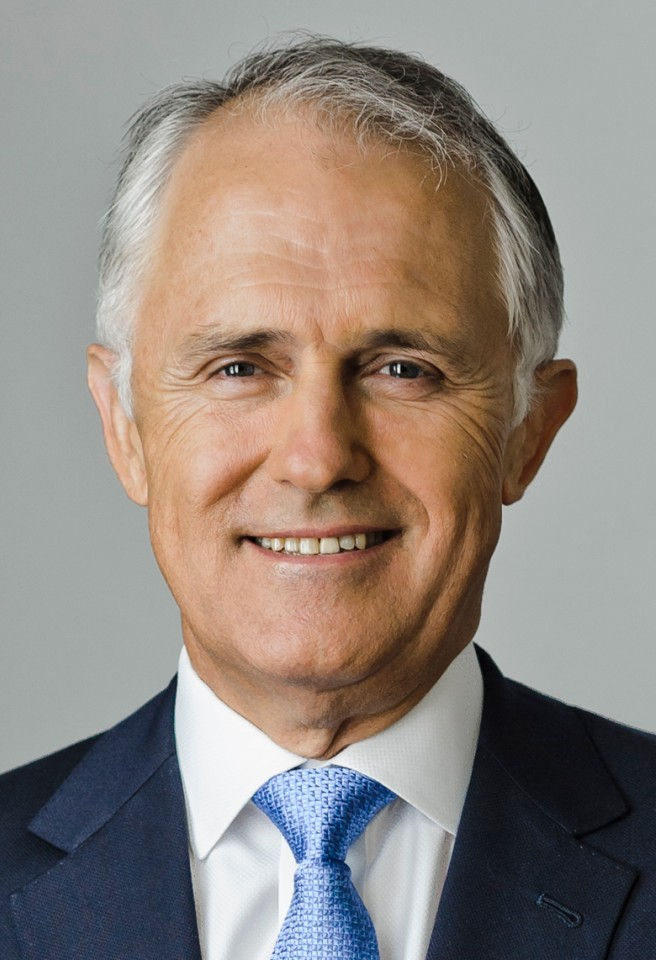
	First party	Second party
Leader	Bill Shorten	Malcolm Turnbull
Party	Labor	Liberal
Last election	2 seats	0 seats
Seats won	2 seats	0 seats
Seat change	Steady	Steady
Popular vote	111,887	87,346
Percentage	44.27%	34.56%
Swing	▲1.22	▼0.06
TPP	61.23%	38.87%
TPP swing	▲1.22	▼1.22
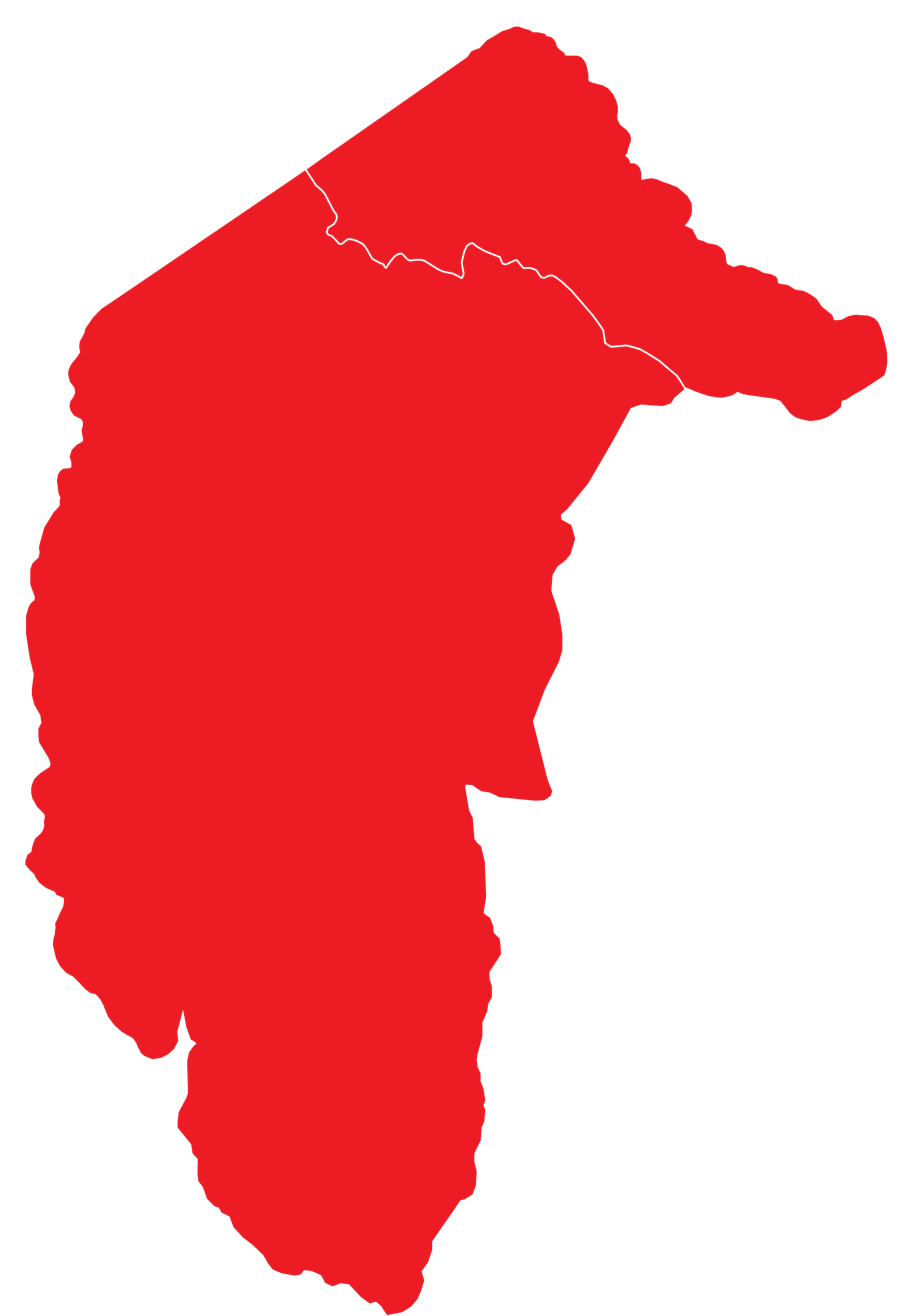

This is a list of electoral division results for the 2016 Australian federal election in the Australian Capital Territory.

=== Overall results ===
Party	Votes	%	Swing	Seats	Change
Australian Labor Party	111,887	44.27	+1.34	2	Steady
Liberal Party of Australia	87,346	34.56	–0.06	0	Steady
Australian Greens	38,129	15.09	+1.69		
Bullet Train for Australia	10,673	4.22	+0.14		
Independent	4,707	1.86	+1.86		
Total	252,742			2	
Two-party-preferred vote
Australian Labor Party	154,489	61.13	+1.22	2	0
Liberal Party of Australia	98,253	38.87	−1.22	0	0

=== Results by division ===
==== Canberra ====
2016 Australian federal election: Canberra
Party	Candidate	Votes	%	±%
Labor	Gai Brodtmann	55,091	42.80	+1.65
Liberal	Jessica Adelan-Langford	48,416	37.61	+0.28
Greens	Patricia Cahill	19,200	14.92	+1.86
Bullet Train	Christopher Bucknell	6,013	4.67	+0.51
Total formal votes		128,720	97.29	+1.14
Informal votes		3,590	2.71	−1.14
Turnout		132,310	92.38	−4.08
Two-party-preferred result
Labor	Gai Brodtmann	75,247	58.46	+0.95
Liberal	Jessica Adelan-Langford	53,473	41.54	−0.95
Labor hold		Swing	+0.95	

==== Fenner ====
2016 Australian federal election: Fenner
Party	Candidate	Votes	%	±%
Labor	Andrew Leigh	56,796	45.80	+0.96
Liberal	Robert Gunning	38,930	31.39	−0.33
Greens	Carly Saeedi	18,929	15.26	+1.50
Independent	Andrew Woodman	4,707	3.80	+3.80
Bullet Train	Tim Bohm	4,660	3.76	−0.24
Total formal votes		124,022	97.18	+0.99
Informal votes		3,595	2.82	−0.99
Turnout		127,617	91.93	−0.88
Two-party-preferred result
Labor	Andrew Leigh	79,242	63.89	+1.40
Liberal	Robert Gunning	44,780	36.11	−1.40
Labor notional hold		Swing	+1.40	

== Northern Territory ==
2016 Australian federal election (Northern Territory)
← 2013	2 July 2016	2019 →

All 2 Northern Territory seats in the Australian House of Representatives and all 2 seats in the Australian Senate
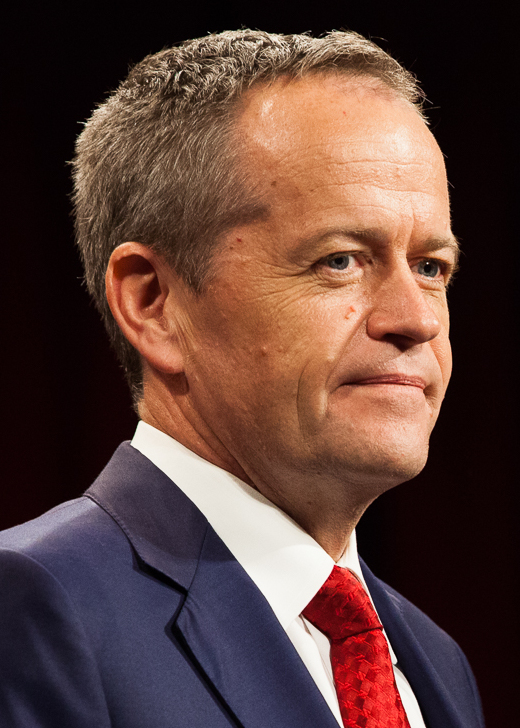

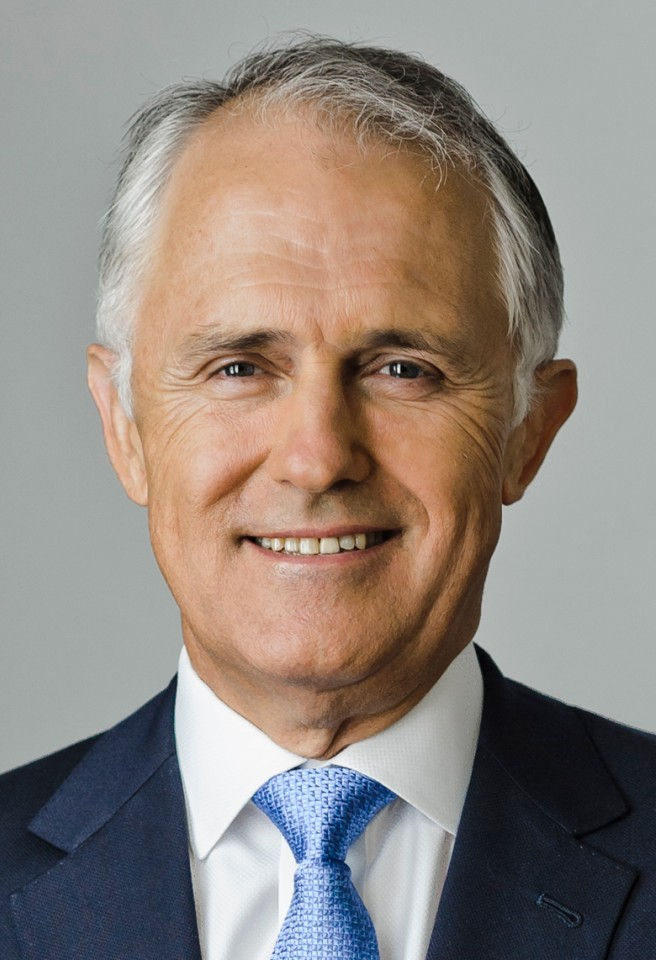
	First party	Second party
Leader	Bill Shorten	Malcolm Turnbull
Party	Labor	Liberal/National coalition
Last election	1 seat	1 seat
Seats won	2 seats	0 seats
Seat change	▲1	▼1
Popular vote	39,364	32,409
Percentage	40.39%	33.25%
Swing	▲2.96	▼8.45
TPP	57.06%	42.94%
TPP swing	▲7.41	▼7.41
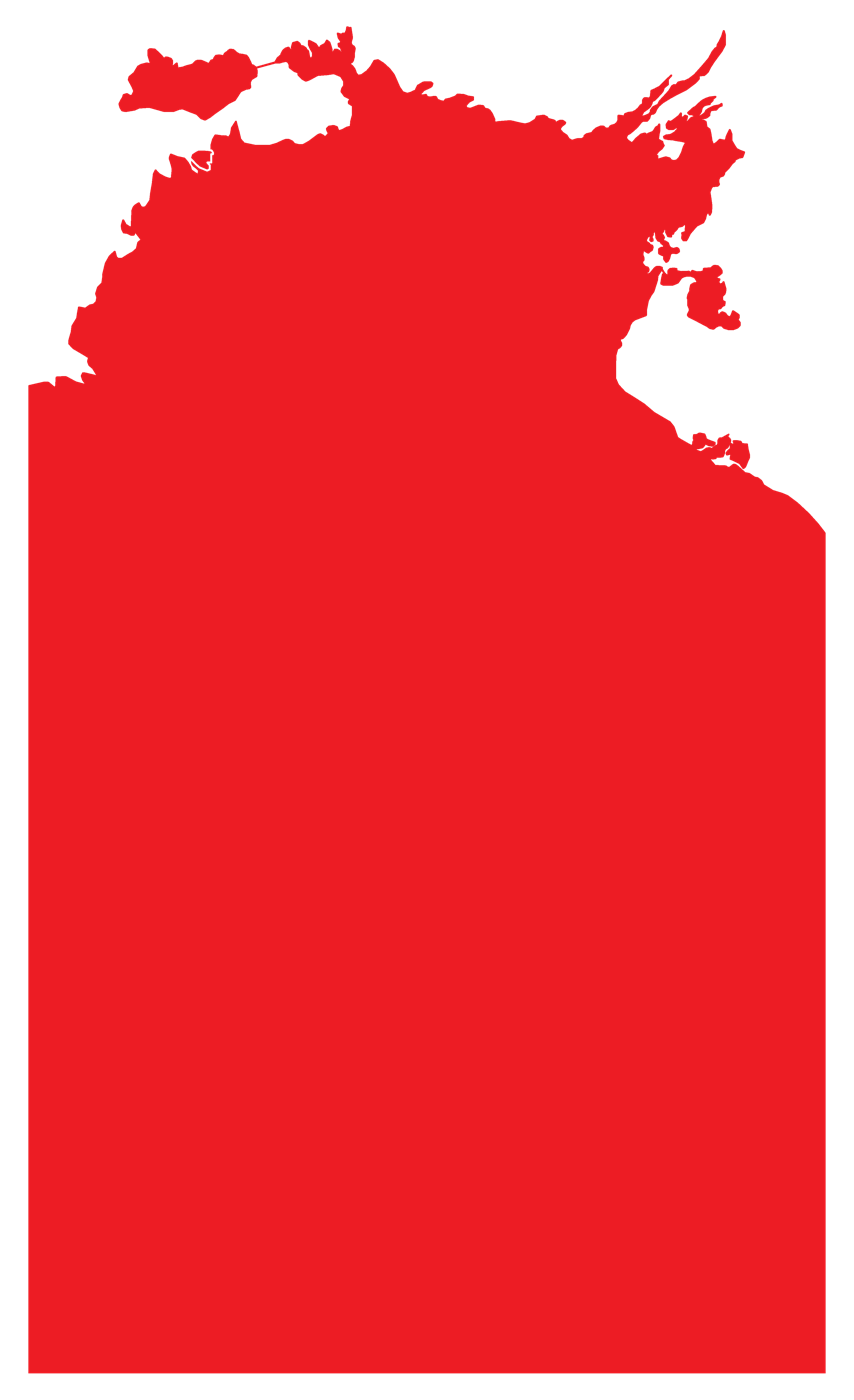
- Electorate Results (%)

This is a list of electoral division results for the 2016 Australian federal election in the Northern Territory.

=== Overall results ===
Party	Votes	%	Swing	Seats	Change
Australian Labor Party	39,364	40.39	+2.96	2	▲1
Country Liberal Party	32,409	33.25	–8.45	0	▼1
Australian Greens	8,858	9.09	+1.20		
Shooters, Fishers and Farmers Party	4,584	4.70	+4.70		
Rise Up Australia Party	2,483	2.55	+1.10		
Liberal Democratic Party	1,275	1.31	+1.31		
Help End Marijuana Prohibition (HEMP) Party	1,143	1.17	+1.17		
Australia First Party	798	0.82	+0.82		
Citizens Electoral Council	444	0.46	−1.41		
Online Direct Democracy	369	0.38	+0.38		
Independent	5,733	5.88	+5.13		
Total	97,460			2	
Two-party-preferred vote
Australian Labor Party	55,614	57.06	+7.41	2	▲1
Country Liberal Party	41,846	42.94	−7.41	0	▼1

Country Liberal to Labor: Solomon

=== Results by division ===
==== Lingiari ====
2016 Australian federal election: Lingiari
Party	Candidate	Votes	%	±%
Labor	Warren Snowdon	17,056	39.78	+0.03
Country Liberal	Tina MacFarlane	13,605	31.73	−6.50
Greens	Rob Hoad	3,305	7.71	−0.05
Shooters, Fishers, Farmers	Chris Righton	3,061	7.14	+7.14
Independent	Yingiya Mark Guyula	1,854	4.32	+4.32
Independent	Braedon Earley	1,808	4.22	+4.22
Rise Up Australia	Regina McCarthy	1,498	3.49	+1.50
Independent	Alfred Gould	427	1.00	−0.63
Citizens Electoral Council	Peter Flynn	261	0.61	−2.95
Total formal votes		42,875	92.15	−0.42
Informal votes		3,650	7.85	+0.42
Turnout		46,525	73.70	−1.72
Two-party-preferred result
Labor	Warren Snowdon	25,048	58.42	+7.54
Country Liberal	Tina MacFarlane	17,827	41.58	−7.54
Labor hold		Swing	+7.54	

==== Solomon ====
2016 Australian federal election: Solomon
Party	Candidate	Votes	%	±%
Labor	Luke Gosling	22,308	40.87	+5.44
Country Liberal	Natasha Griggs	18,804	34.45	−10.24
Greens	Todd Williams	5,553	10.17	+2.18
Independent	Mark Garner	1,644	3.01	+3.01
Shooters, Fishers, Farmers	Marty Reinhold	1,523	2.79	+2.79
Liberal Democrats	Robert Dawes	1,275	2.34	+2.34
HEMP	Lance Lawrence	1,143	2.09	+2.09
Rise Up Australia	Silvija Majetic	985	1.80	+0.81
Australia First	John Kearney	798	1.46	+1.46
Online Direct Democracy	Nevin Cartwright	369	0.68	+0.68
Citizens Electoral Council	Brigid McCullough	183	0.34	−0.07
Total formal votes		54,585	93.05	−1.65
Informal votes		4,080	6.95	+1.65
Turnout		58,665	83.81	−5.50
Two-party-preferred result
Labor	Luke Gosling	30,566	56.00	+7.40
Country Liberal	Natasha Griggs	24,019	44.00	−7.40
Labor gain from Country Liberal		Swing	+7.40	
