= Editha Olga Bailey =

(1903–1980) community worker

Lady Editha Bailey OBE
- Born: Edith Olga Yseult; 3 July 1903; London, England
- Died: 1 August 1980 (aged 77); England
- Known for: Founding president of the Canberra Nursery Kindergarten Society; President of the Australian Capital Territory branch of the National Council of Women; President of the Australian Pre-School Association
- Spouse: Kenneth Bailey (m. 1925)
- Children: 3

Editha Olga Yseult, Lady Bailey OBE (née Donnison, 3 July 1903 – 1 August 1980) was founding president of the Canberra Nursery Kindergarten Society (1943), and president of the Australian Capital Territory branch of the National Council of Women (1946–50).

== Life and career ==
Bailey was born on 3 July 1903, in London, England. Her father was Frank Samuel Donnison. She was educated at Wycombe Abbey, a renowned independent school for girls, and went on to study sculpture at the Slade School of Fine Art, at the University of London. She met her future husband Kenneth Bailey, a Rhodes Scholar from Melbourne, through her brother Vernon Donnison, who was at Corpus Christi College, Oxford with him.

Despite the ill feelings of her mother, Yseult Bailey married Kenneth Bailey on 12 August 1925 at Queen's College Chapel at the University of Melbourne. Living in Melbourne in the 1930s and early 1940s, and mother of three sons, Yseult Bailey was active in the Kindergarten Union of Victoria, the establishment of the Lady Gowrie Centre for pre-school education and the University Women's Wartime Nursery.

During World War II the family moved to Canberra, where Kenneth Bailey was Consultant to the Commonwealth Government and later head of the Attorney-General's Department. Yseult Bailey became active in the movement to establish a kindergarten in Canberra. In 1942 she was a member of an unsuccessful delegation to the Minister for Health and Social Services, E. J. Holloway, seeking the establishment of a nursery school in Canberra to free mothers for war work. After the focus changed to seeking provision of a nursery kindergarten, Yseult Bailey and two other members of the deputation were invited to Government House to advise Lady Gowrie on the progress of the project. Following this meeting, Yseult Bailey was appointed president of a provisional pre-school committee. She continued in this role when the Canberra Nursery Kindergarten Society (later the Canberra Pre-School Society) was formally constituted in November 1943.

Yseult Bailey was prominent in the formation of the Australian Pre-School Association, served as president, was made a life member and remained an honorary life vice-president until her death. In the New Year's Honours of 1961, she was appointed an Officer of the Order of the British Empire (OBE) for her work for pre-school education.

Her husband was knighted in 1958, and she became Lady Bailey. She died on 1 August 1980, in England, aged 77.
