= Results of the 2013 Australian federal election in territories =

== Australian Capital Territory ==
2013 Australian federal election (Australian Capital Territory)
← 2010	7 September 2013	2016 →

All 2 Australian Capital Territory seats in the Australian House of Representatives and all 2 seats in the Australian Senate
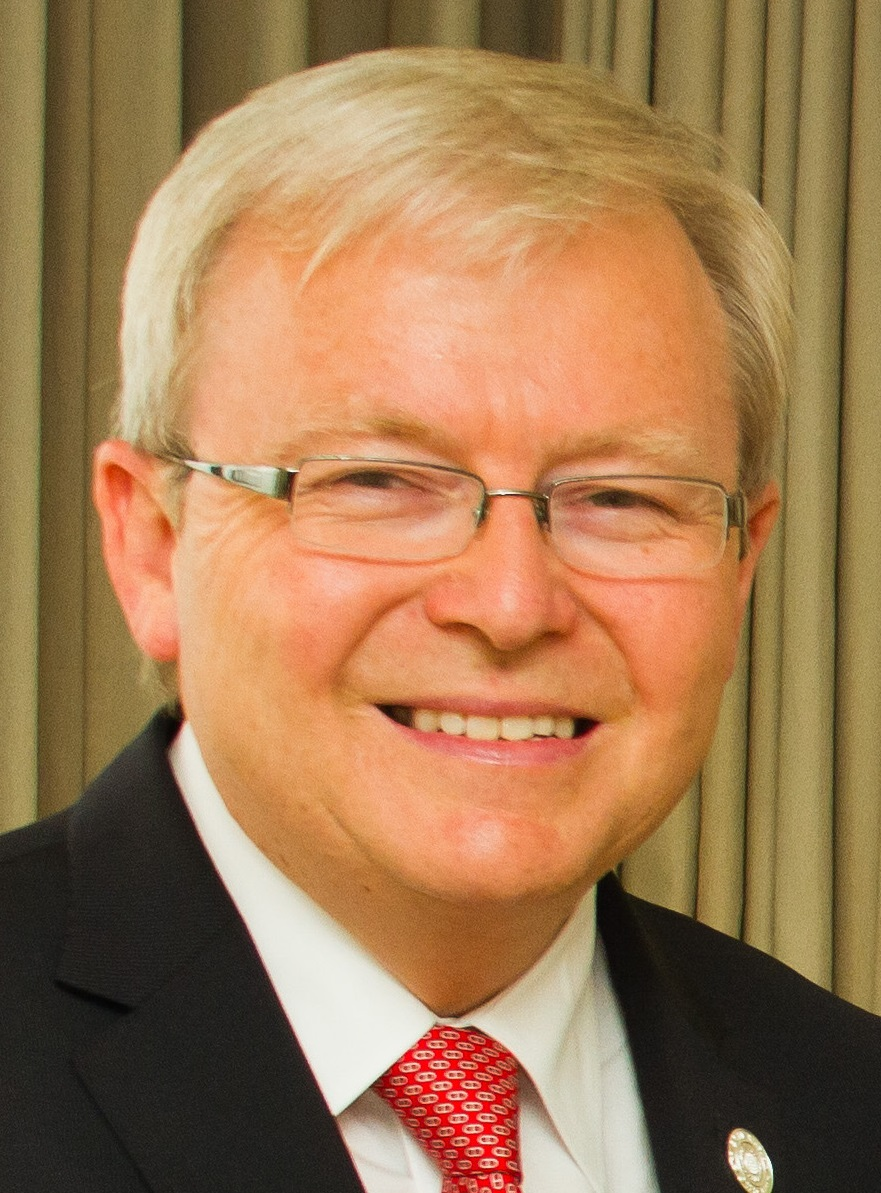

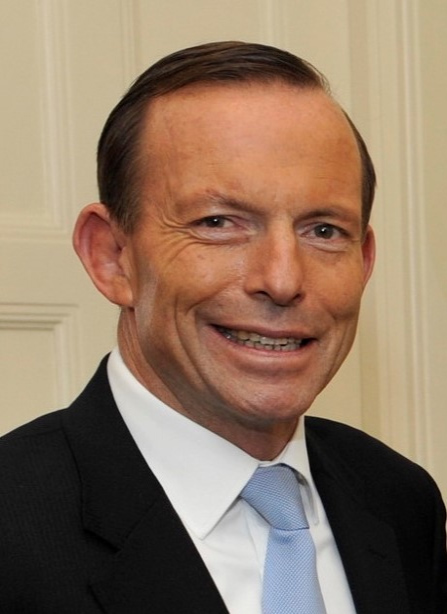
	First party	Second party
Leader	Kevin Rudd	Tony Abbott
Party	Labor	Liberal
Last election	2 seats	0 seats
Seats won	2 seats	0 seats
Seat change	Steady	Steady
Popular vote	103,676	96,815
Percentage	42.93%	34.62%
Swing	▼2.09	▼0.19
TPP	59.91%	40.09%
TPP swing	▼1.76	▲1.76
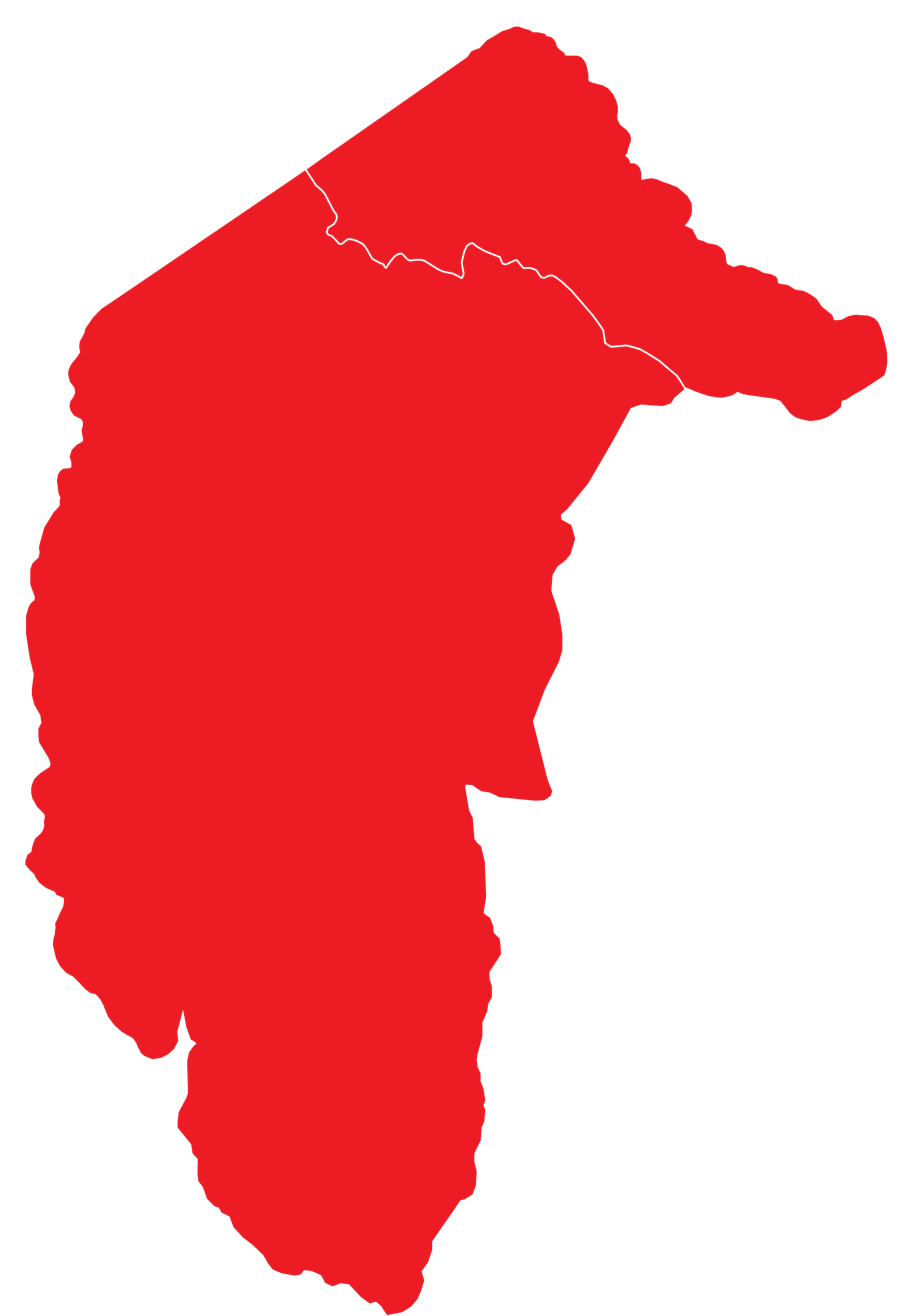

Turnout 94.59% (CV) — Informal 3.83%
Party	Votes	%	Swing	Seats	Change
Australian Labor Party	103,676	42.93	–2.09	2	Steady
Liberal Party of Australia	83,612	34.62	−0.19	0	Steady
Australian Greens	32,356	13.40	–5.80		
Bullet Train for Australia	9,855	4.08	+4.08		
Palmer United Party	6,788	2.81	+2.81		
Australian Democrats	2,444	1.01	+1.01		
Rise Up Australia Party	1,508	0.62	+0.62		
Secular Party of Australia	1,264	0.52	−0.45		
Total	241,503			2	
Two-party-preferred vote
Australian Labor Party	144,688	59.91	–1.76	2	Steady
Liberal/National Coalition	96,815	40.09	+1.76	0	Steady

=== Canberra ===
2013 Australian federal election: Canberra
Party	Candidate	Votes	%	±%
Labor	Gai Brodtmann	47,613	41.06	−3.17
Liberal	Tom Sefton	43,919	37.87	+0.66
Greens	Julie Melrose	14,691	12.67	−5.89
Bullet Train	Damien Maher	4,756	4.10	+4.10
Palmer United	Tony Hanley	3,725	3.21	+3.21
Secular	Nicolle Burt	1,264	1.09	+1.09
Total formal votes		115,968	96.06	+0.94
Informal votes		4,758	3.94	−0.94
Turnout		120,726	94.75	−0.11
Two-party-preferred result
Labor	Gai Brodtmann	66,074	56.98	−2.17
Liberal	Tom Sefton	49,894	43.02	+2.17
Labor hold		Swing	−2.17	

=== Fraser ===
2013 Australian federal election: Fraser
Party	Candidate	Votes	%	±%
Labor	Andrew Leigh	56,063	44.66	−1.15
Liberal	Elizabeth Lee	39,693	31.62	−0.79
Greens	Adam Verwey	17,665	14.07	−5.77
Bullet Train	Sam Huggins	5,099	4.06	+4.06
Palmer United	Freddy Alcazar	3,063	2.44	+2.44
Democrats	Darren Churchill	2,444	1.95	+1.95
Rise Up Australia	Jill Ross	1,508	1.20	+1.20
Total formal votes		125,535	96.27	+0.70
Informal votes		4,859	3.73	−0.70
Turnout		130,394	94.46	+0.07
Two-party-preferred result
Labor	Andrew Leigh	78,614	62.62	−1.58
Liberal	Elizabeth Lee	46,921	37.38	+1.58
Labor hold		Swing	−1.58	

== Northern Territory ==
2013 Australian federal election (Northern Territory)
← 2010	7 September 2013	2016 →

All 2 Australian Capital Territory seats in the Australian House of Representatives and all 2 seats in the Australian Senate
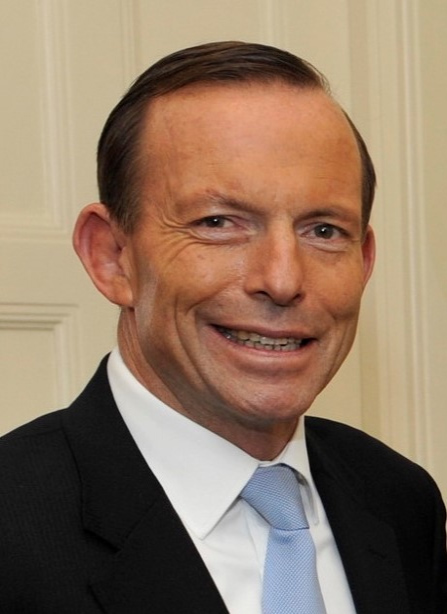

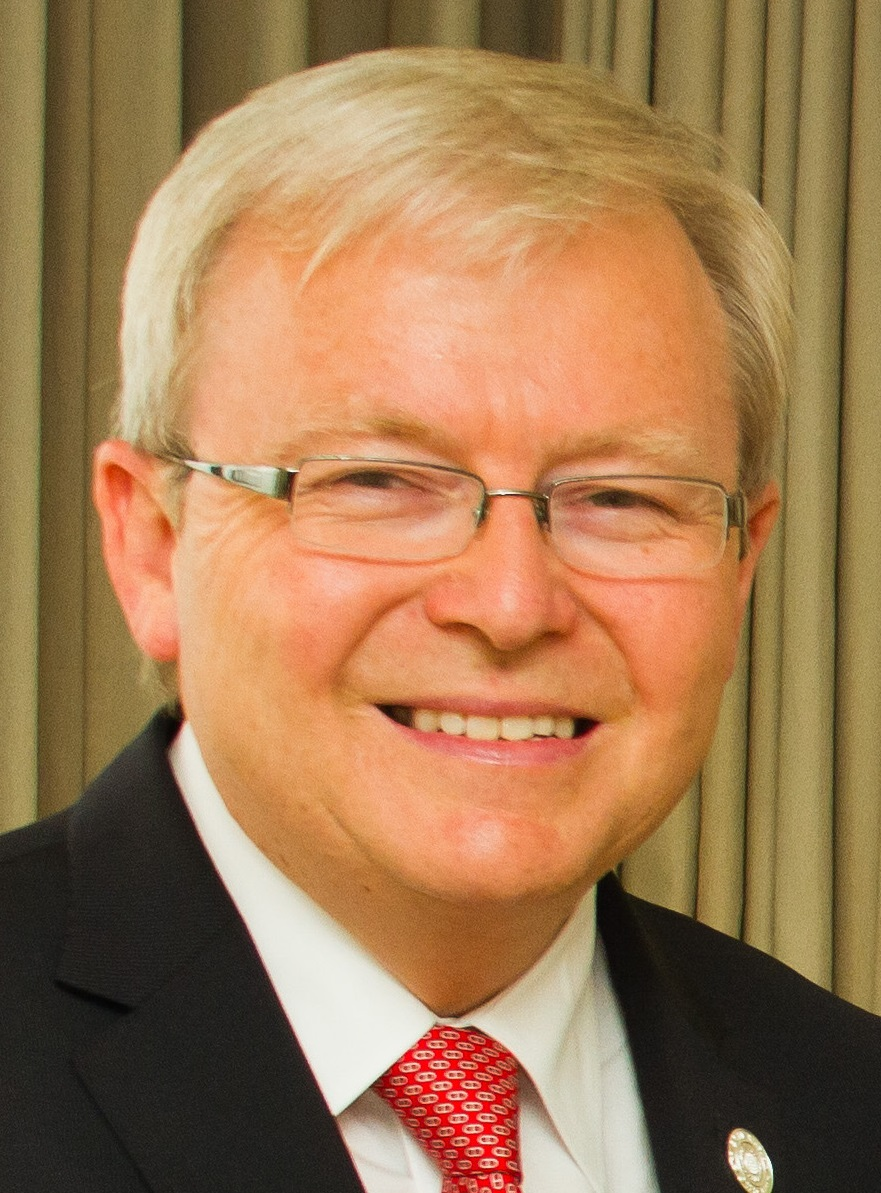
	First party	Second party
Leader	Tony Abbott	Kevin Rudd
Party	Liberal/National coalition	Labor
Last election	1 seat	1 seat
Seats won	1	1
Seat change	Steady	Steady
Popular vote	41,468	37,221
Percentage	41.70%	37.43%
Swing	▲0.87	▼0.48
TPP	50.35%	49.65%
TPP swing	▲1.09	▼1.09
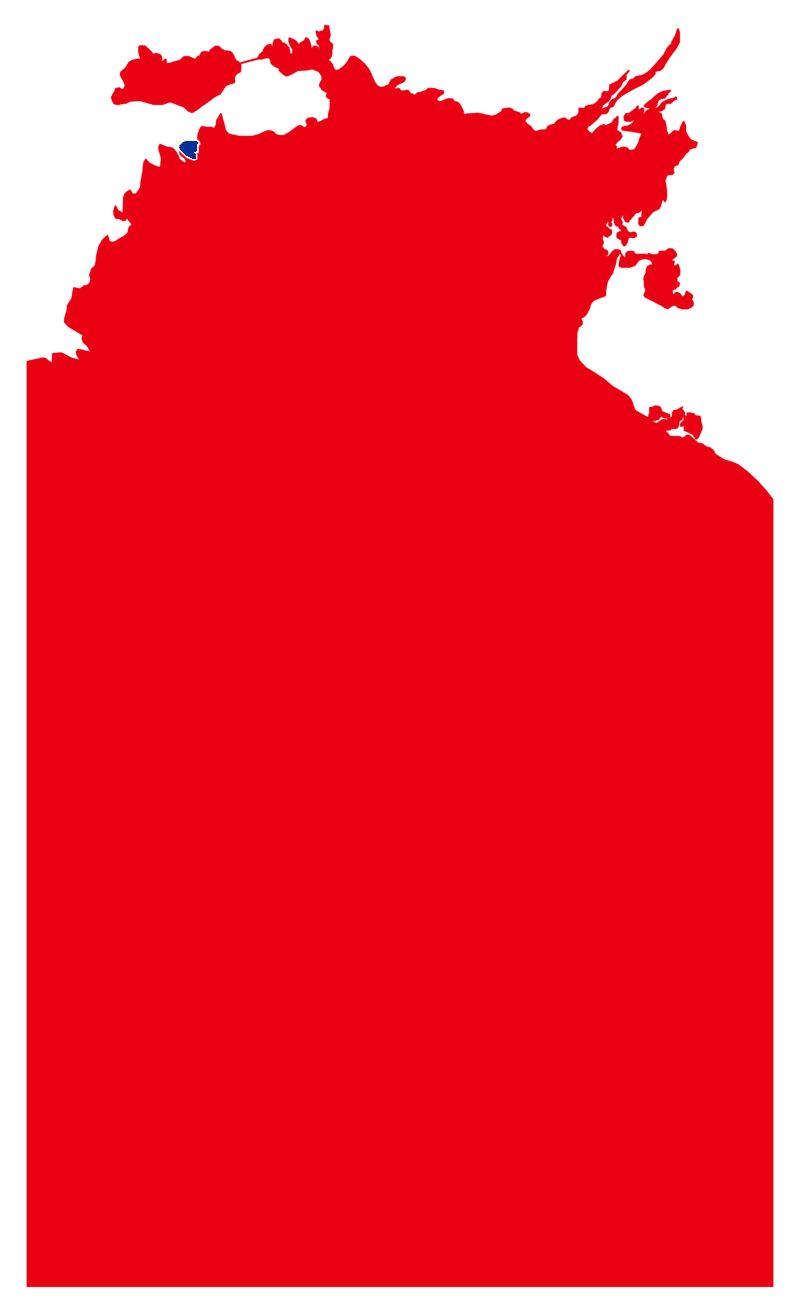
- Electorate Results

Turnout 82.14% (CV) — Informal 6.30%
Party	Votes	%	Swing	Seats	Change
Country Liberal Party	41,468	41.70	+0.87	1	Steady
Australian Labor Party	37,221	37.43	–0.48	1	Steady
Australian Greens	7,841	7.89	–5.08		
Palmer United Party	4,609	4.63	+4.63		
Citizens Electoral Council	1,856	1.87	−0.61		
Australian Sex Party	1,847	1.86	+1.86		
Australian First Nations Political Party	1,810	1.82	+1.82		
Rise Up Australia Party	1,444	1.45	+1.45		
Voluntary Euthanasia Party	597	0.60	+0.60		
Independents	748	0.75	−3.46		
Total	99,441			2	
Two-party-preferred vote
Country Liberal	50,067	50.35	+1.09	1	Steady
Australian Labor Party	49,374	49.65	–1.09	1	Steady

=== Lingiari ===
2013 Australian federal election: Lingiari
Party	Candidate	Votes	%	±%
Labor	Warren Snowdon	18,292	39.75	−0.33
Country Liberal	Tina MacFarlane	17,593	38.23	+3.97
Greens	Barbara Shaw	3,572	7.76	−4.83
Palmer United	Trevor Hedland	1,918	4.17	+4.17
Citizens Electoral Council	Peter Flynn	1,639	3.56	−0.31
First Nations	Kenneth Lechleitner	1,340	2.91	+2.91
Rise Up Australia	Regina McCarthy	917	1.99	+1.99
Independent	Alf Gould	748	1.63	+1.63
Total formal votes		46,019	92.57	+0.07
Informal votes		3,696	7.43	−0.07
Turnout		49,715	75.40	−0.47
Two-party-preferred result
Labor	Warren Snowdon	23,413	50.88	−2.82
Country Liberal	Tina MacFarlane	22,606	49.12	+2.82
Labor hold		Swing	−2.82	

=== Solomon ===
2013 Australian federal election: Solomon
Party	Candidate	Votes	%	±%
Country Liberal	Natasha Griggs	23,875	44.69	−1.68
Labor	Luke Gosling	18,929	35.43	−0.65
Greens	Todd Williams	4,269	7.99	−5.30
Palmer United	Stephen Spain	2,691	5.04	+5.04
Sex Party	Krystal Metcalf	1,847	3.46	+3.46
Voluntary Euthanasia	Martin Burgess	597	1.12	+1.12
Rise Up Australia	Paul Sellick	527	0.99	+0.99
First Nations	Eileen Cummings	470	0.88	+0.88
Citizens Electoral Council	Trudy Campbell	217	0.41	−0.90
Total formal votes		53,422	94.70	−0.24
Informal votes		2,991	5.30	+0.24
Turnout		56,413	89.17	−0.45
Two-party-preferred result
Country Liberal	Natasha Griggs	27,461	51.40	−0.35
Labor	Luke Gosling	25,961	48.60	+0.35
Country Liberal hold		Swing	−0.35	

== See also ==
- 2013 Australian federal election
- Results of the 2013 Australian federal election (House of Representatives)
- Post-election pendulum for the 2013 Australian federal election
- Members of the Australian House of Representatives, 2013–2016
