= Results of the 2010 Australian federal election in territories =

This is a list of electoral divisions for the Australian 2010 federal election for the Australian Capital Territory and the Northern Territory.

== Australian Capital Territory ==
2010 Australian federal election (Australian Capital Territory)
← 2007	21 August 2010	2013 →

Both Australian Capital Territory seats in the Australian House of Representatives and both seats in the Australian Senate
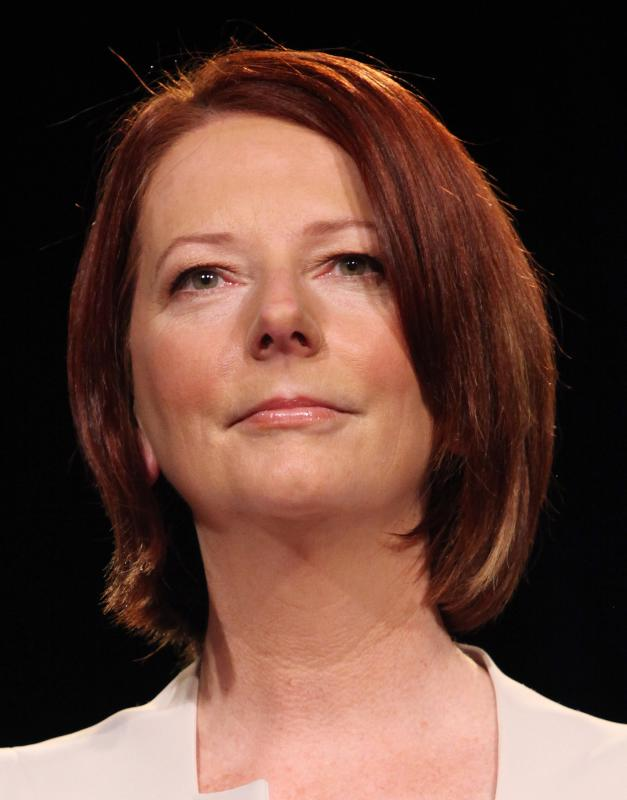

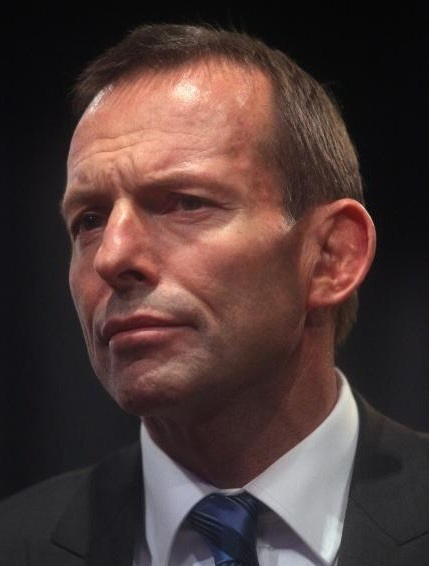
	First party	Second party
Leader	Julia Gillard	Tony Abbott
Party	Labor	Liberal
Last election	2 seats	0 seats
Seats won	2 seats	0 seats
Seat change	Steady	Steady
Popular vote	100,700	77,880
Percentage	45.02%	34.81%
Swing	▼6.08	▲1.58
TPP	61.67%	38.33%
TPP swing	▲1.73	▼1.73
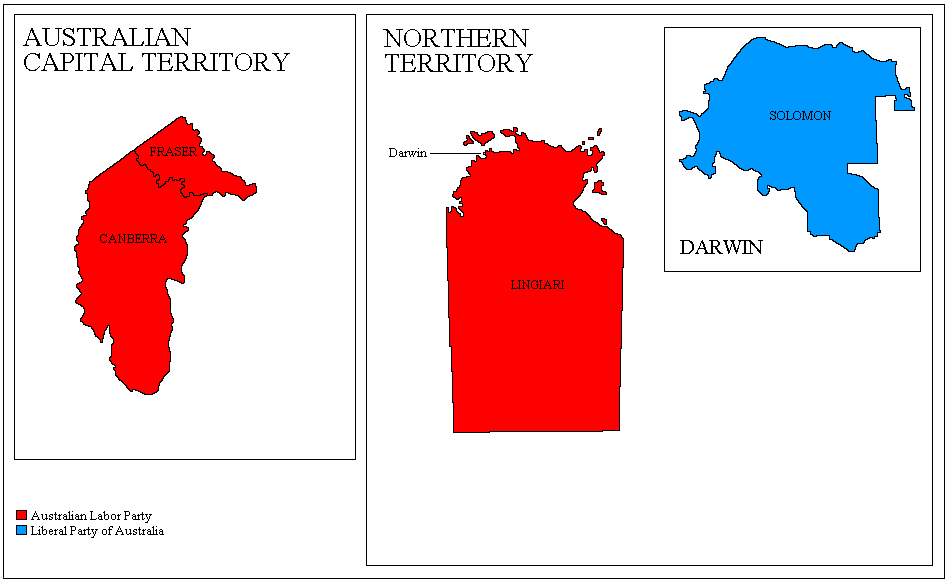
- Electoral divisions: Territories

House of Representatives (IRV) — Turnout 94.74% (CV) — Informal 4.66%
Party	Votes	%	Swing	Seats	Change
Australian Labor Party	100,700	45.02	–6.08	2	Steady
Liberal	77,880	34.81	+1.58	0	Steady
Australian Greens	42,942	19.20	+6.04		
Secular Party of Australia	2,175	0.97	+0.97		
Total	223,697			2	
Two-party-preferred vote
Australian Labor Party	137,948	61.67	–1.73	2	Steady
Liberal	85,749	38.33	+1.73	0	Steady
Invalid/blank votes		10,926	4.66	+2.35	
Registered voters/turnout		247,941	94.63		
Source: Commonwealth Election 2010

=== Results by division ===
==== Canberra ====
2010 Australian federal election: Canberra
Party	Candidate	Votes	%	±%
Labor	Gai Brodtmann	49,608	44.23	−6.87
Liberal	Giulia Jones	41,732	37.21	+2.08
Greens	Sue Ellerman	20,816	18.56	+5.61
Total formal votes		112,156	95.12	−2.62
Informal votes		5,755	4.88	+2.62
Turnout		117,911	94.92	−1.09
Two-party-preferred result
Labor	Gai Brodtmann	66,335	59.15	−2.67
Liberal	Giulia Jones	45,821	40.85	+2.67
Labor hold		Swing	−2.67	

==== Fraser ====
2010 Australian federal election: Fraser
Party	Candidate	Votes	%	±%
Labor	Andrew Leigh	51,092	45.81	−5.29
Liberal	James Milligan	36,148	32.41	+1.18
Greens	Indra Esguerra	22,126	19.84	+6.46
Secular	Quintin Hedges-Phillips	2,175	1.95	+1.95
Total formal votes		111,541	95.57	−2.07
Informal votes		5,171	4.43	+2.07
Turnout		116,712	94.55	−1.12
Two-party-preferred result
Labor	Andrew Leigh	71,613	64.20	−0.87
Liberal	James Milligan	39,928	35.80	+0.87
Labor hold		Swing	−0.87	

== Northern Territory ==
2010 Australian federal election (Northern Territory)
← 2007	21 August 2010	2013 →

Both Northern Territory seats in the Australian House of Representatives and both seats in the Australian Senate
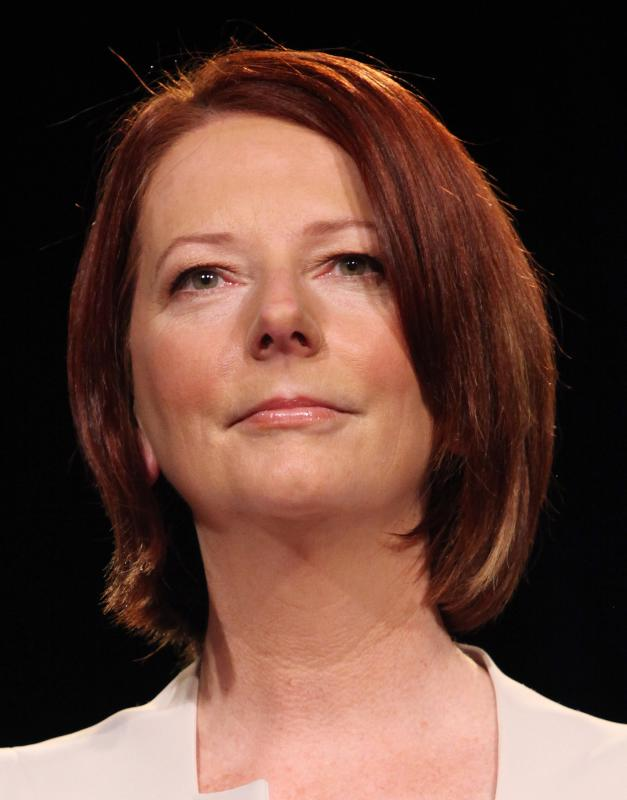

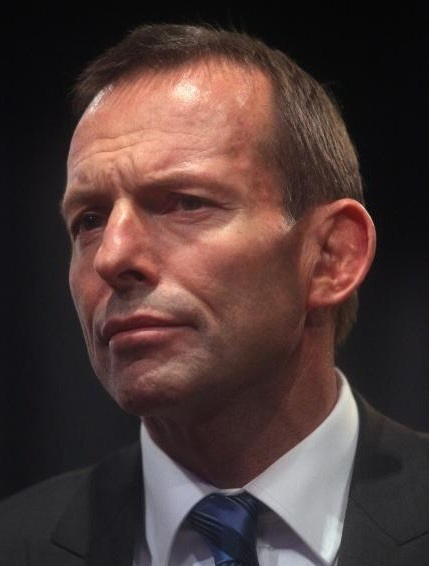
	First party	Second party
Leader	Julia Gillard	Tony Abbott
Party	Labor	Liberal/National coalition
Last election	2 seats	0 seats
Seats won	1	1
Seat change	▼1	▲1
Popular vote	35,589	38,335
Percentage	37.91%	40.83%
Swing	▼9.74	▼0.20
TPP	50.74%	49.26%
TPP swing	▼4.67	▲4.67
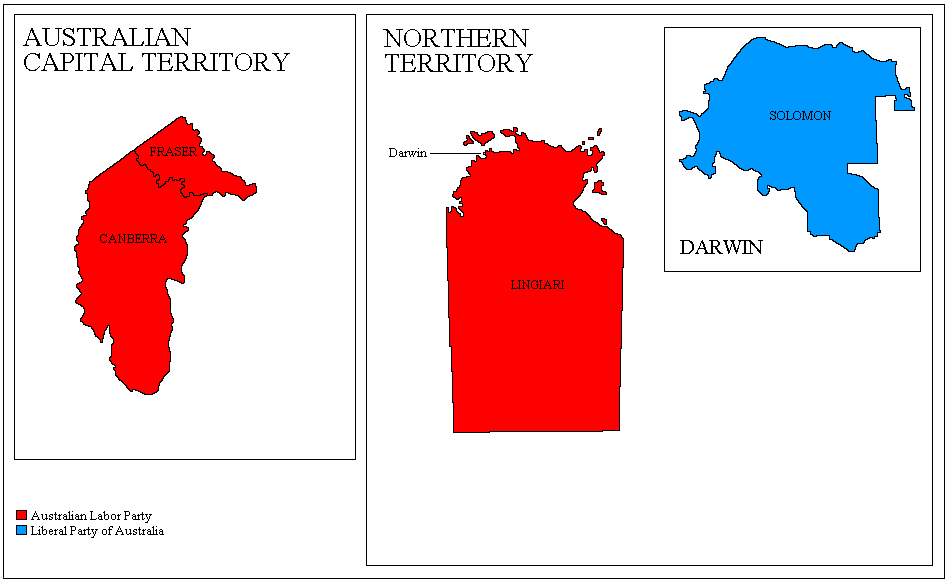
- Electoral divisions: Territories

House of Representatives (IRV) — Turnout 82.71% (CV) — Informal 6.19%
Party	Votes	%	Swing	Seats	Change
Country Liberal Party	38,335	40.83	–0.20	1	▲1
Australian Labor Party	35,589	37.91	–9.74	1	▼1
Australian Greens	12,175	12.97	+4.92		
Independents	3,948	4.21	+1.55		
Citizens Electoral Council	2,331	2.48	+2.23		
One Nation	1,505	1.60	+1.60		
Total	93,883			2	
Two-party-preferred vote
Australian Labor Party	47,636	50.74	–4.67	1	▼1
Country Liberal Party	46,247	49.26	+4.67	1	▲1
Invalid/blank votes		6,198	6.19	+2.34	
Registered voters/turnout		121,059	82.67		
Source: Commonwealth Election 2010

=== Results by division ===
==== Lingiari ====
2010 Australian federal election: Lingiari
Party	Candidate	Votes	%	±%
Labor	Warren Snowdon	17,205	40.08	−13.91
Country Liberal	Leo Abbott	14,708	34.26	−0.40
Greens	Barbara Shaw	5,403	12.59	+5.67
Independent	Deirdre Finter	2,038	4.75	+4.75
First Nations	Kenny Lechleitner	1,910	4.45	+4.45
Citizens Electoral Council	Peter Flynn	1,663	3.87	+3.87
Total formal votes		42,927	92.50	−2.65
Informal votes		3,482	7.50	+2.65
Turnout		46,409	75.92	−5.34
Two-party-preferred result
Labor	Warren Snowdon	23,051	53.70	−7.46
Country Liberal	Leo Abbott	19,876	46.30	+7.46
Labor hold		Swing	−7.46	

==== Solomon ====
2010 Australian federal election: Solomon
Party	Candidate	Votes	%	±%
Country Liberal	Natasha Griggs	23,627	46.37	−0.43
Labor	Damian Hale	18,384	36.08	−5.82
Greens	Emma Young	6,772	13.29	+4.22
One Nation	John Kearney	1,505	2.95	+2.95
Citizens Electoral Council	Trudy Campbell	668	1.31	+0.83
Total formal votes		50,956	94.94	−2.13
Informal votes		2,716	5.06	+2.13
Turnout		53,672	89.63	−2.43
Two-party-preferred result
Country Liberal	Natasha Griggs	26,371	51.75	+1.94
Labor	Damian Hale	24,585	48.25	−1.94
Country Liberal gain from Labor		Swing	+1.94	

== See also ==
- 2010 Australian federal election
- Results of the 2010 Australian federal election (House of Representatives)
- Post-election pendulum for the 2010 Australian federal election
- Members of the Australian House of Representatives, 2010–2013
