= Alan Rose (public servant) =

Australian public servant

Alan Rose AO

Secretary of the Attorney-General's Department
- In office 1989–1994

Secretary of the Department of Community Services
- In office 4 March 1986 – 24 July 1987

Personal details
- Born: Alan Douglas Rose; 3 May 1944
- Education: University of Queensland; London School of Economics
- Occupation: Public servant

Alan Douglas Rose AO (born 3 May 1944) is a former senior Australian public servant. He was Secretary of the Attorney-General's Department between 1989 and 1994.

== Life and career ==
Alan Rose was born in Brisbane on 3 May 1944. He was educated at state schools: Rainworth State School and Indooroopilly State High School. He later attended the University of Queensland, where he earned a BA in 1966 and an LLB(Hons) in 1969, and the London School of Economics, where he earned an LLM in 1979.

From 1986 to 1987, Rose was Secretary of the Department of Community Services. In the 1987 public service restructure, when all Australian Government departments were reorganised into 16 "super-ministries", Rose was named Associate Secretary of the Attorney-General's Department. He was promoted to become the Department's Secretary in 1989.

In May 1994, Rose left his Secretary role and was appointed President of the Australian Law Reform Commission.

Rose joined law firm HWL Ebsworth as a consultant in 2011. The same year, he was also appointed Chair of the Defence Honours and Awards Tribunal.

== Awards ==
Rose was made an Officer of the Order of Australia in January 1994 for service to public administration, particularly through service to the Attorney-General's Department.

== Notes ==
Preceded by Mike Codd	Secretary of the Department of Community Services; 1986 – 1987	Succeeded by Tony Ayers as Secretary of the Department of Community Services and Health
Preceded by Pat Brazil	Secretary of the Attorney-General's Department; 1989 – 1994	Succeeded by Stephen Skehill
