= Results of the 2019 Australian federal election in territories =

This is a list of division results for the 2019 Australian federal election in the Australian Capital Territory and the Northern Territory.

== Australian Capital Territory ==
2019 Australian federal election (Australian Capital Territory)
← 2016	18 May 2019	2022 →

All 3 Australian Capital Territory seats in the Australian House of Representatives and all 2 seats in the Australian Senate
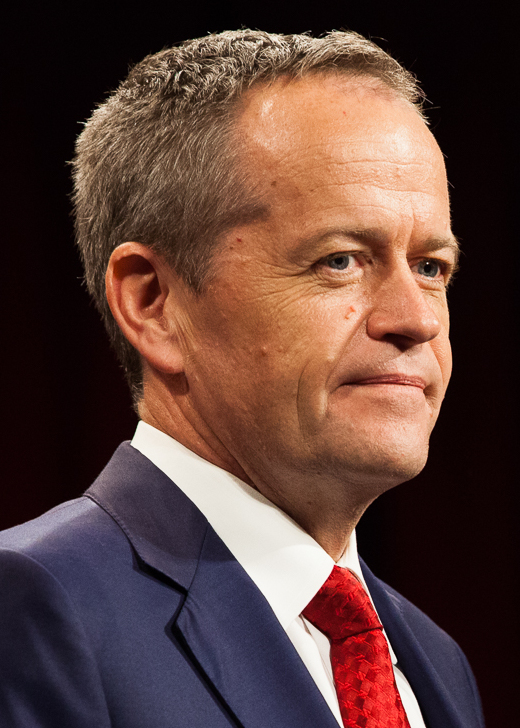

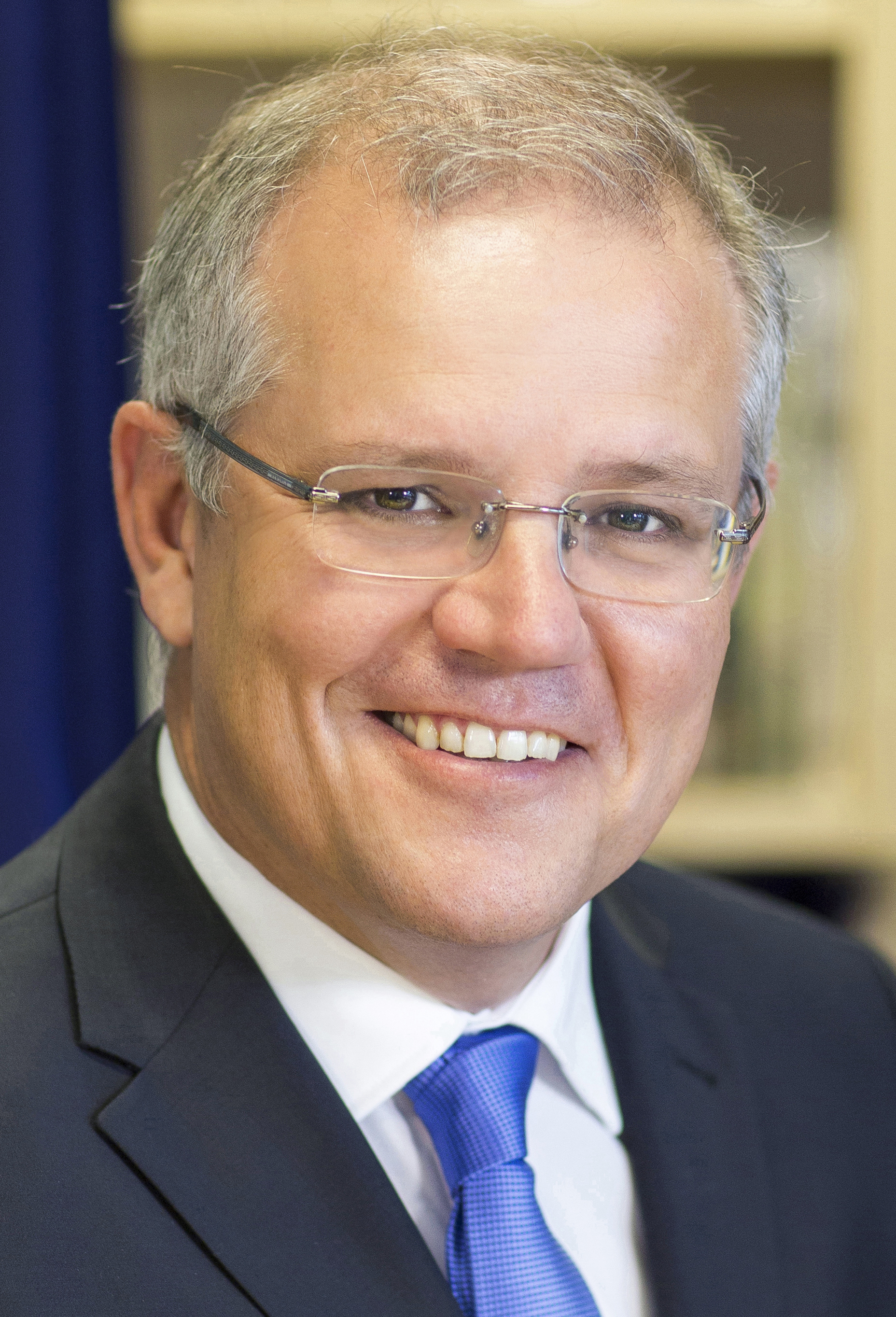
	First party	Second party
Leader	Bill Shorten	Scott Morrison
Party	Labor	Liberal
Last election	2 seats	0 seats
Seats won	3 seats	0 seats
Seat change	▲1	Steady
Popular vote	109,300	83,311
Percentage	41.09%	31.32%
Swing	▼3.18	▼3.24
TPP	61.61%	38.39%
TPP swing	▲0.48	▼0.48
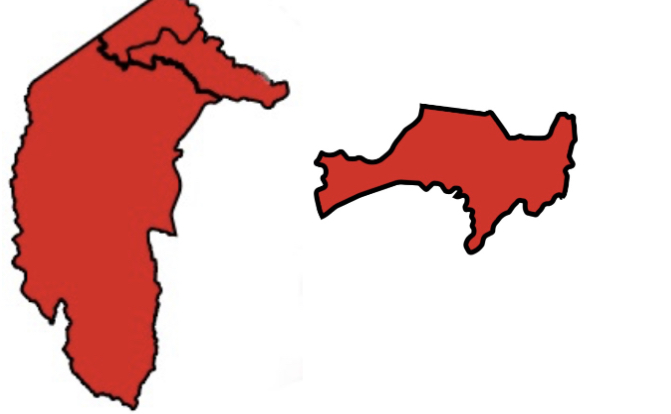
- Results by electorate.

=== Overall results ===
Party	Votes	%	Swing	Seats	Change
Australian Labor Party	109,300	41.09	−3.18	3	▲1
Liberal Party of Australia	83,311	31.32	−3.24	0	Steady
Australian Greens	44,804	16.85	+1.76		
United Australia Party	7,117	2.68	+2.68		
Australian Progressives	6,229	2.34	+2.34		
Liberal Democratic Party	2,540	0.95	+0.95		
The Great Australian Party	929	0.35	+0.35		
Independent	11,745	4.42	+2.56		
Total	265,975			3	▲1
Two-party-preferred vote
Labor	163,878	61.61	+0.48		▲1
Liberal	102,097	38.39	−0.48		Steady
Invalid/blank votes	9,616	3.49	+0.73		
Registered voters/turnout	295,847	93.15	+0.99		
Source: AEC Tally Room

=== Results by division ===
==== Bean ====
2019 Australian federal election: Bean
Party	Candidate	Votes	%	±%
Labor	David Smith	35,447	38.14	−6.25
Liberal	Ed Cocks	29,223	31.44	−5.85
Greens	Johnathan Davis	12,168	13.09	−0.57
Independent	Jamie Christie	7,683	8.27	+8.27
Progressives	Therese Faulkner	2,722	2.93	+2.93
Liberal Democrats	Matt Donnelly	2,540	2.73	+2.73
United Australia	Tony Hanley	2,227	2.40	+2.40
Great Australian	Ben Rushton	929	1.00	+1.00
Total formal votes		92,939	94.85	−2.16
Informal votes		5,043	5.15	+2.16
Turnout		97,982	93.78	+0.09
Two-party-preferred result
Labor	David Smith	53,455	57.52	−1.33
Liberal	Ed Cocks	39,484	42.48	+1.33
Labor notional hold		Swing	−1.33	

==== Canberra ====
2019 Australian federal election: Canberra
Party	Candidate	Votes	%	±%
Labor	Alicia Payne	34,989	40.50	−1.95
Liberal	Mina Zaki	24,063	27.85	−4.94
Greens	Tim Hollo	20,144	23.31	+4.59
Independent	Tim Bohm	4,062	4.70	+4.70
Progressives	Robert Knight	1,784	2.06	+2.06
United Australia	Greg De Maine	1,361	1.58	+1.58
Total formal votes		86,403	97.84	+0.13
Informal votes		1,904	2.16	−0.13
Turnout		88,307	92.62	+1.17
Two-party-preferred result
Labor	Alicia Payne	57,961	67.08	+4.14
Liberal	Mina Zaki	28,442	32.92	−4.14
Labor hold		Swing	+4.14	

==== Fenner ====
2019 Australian federal election: Fenner
Party	Candidate	Votes	%	±%
Labor	Andrew Leigh	38,864	44.86	−1.12
Liberal	Leanne Castley	30,025	34.66	+1.37
Greens	Andrew Braddock	12,492	14.42	+1.42
United Australia	Glen Hodgson	3,529	4.07	+4.07
Progressives	Kagiso Ratlhagane	1,723	1.99	+1.99
Total formal votes		86,633	97.01	+0.01
Informal votes		2,669	2.99	−0.01
Turnout		89,302	93.01	+1.81
Two-party-preferred result
Labor	Andrew Leigh	52,462	60.56	−1.28
Liberal	Leanne Castley	34,171	39.44	+1.28
Labor hold		Swing	−1.28	

== Northern Territory ==
2019 Australian federal election (Northern Territory)
← 2016	18 May 2019	2022 →

All 2 Northern Territory seats in the Australian House of Representatives and all 2 seats in the Australian Senate
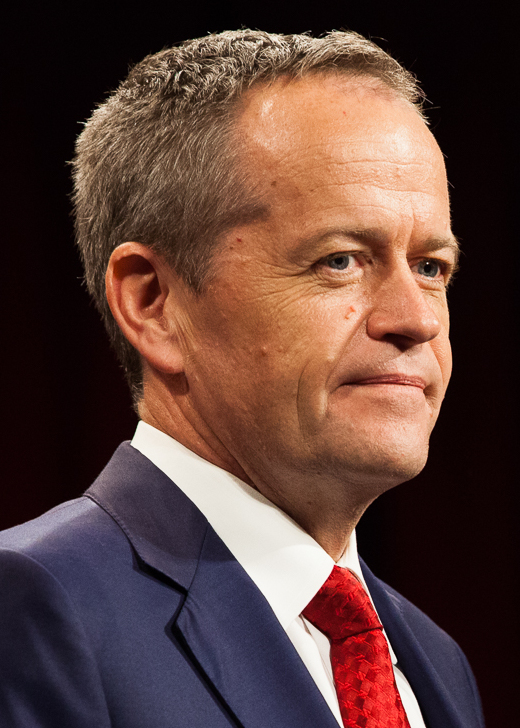

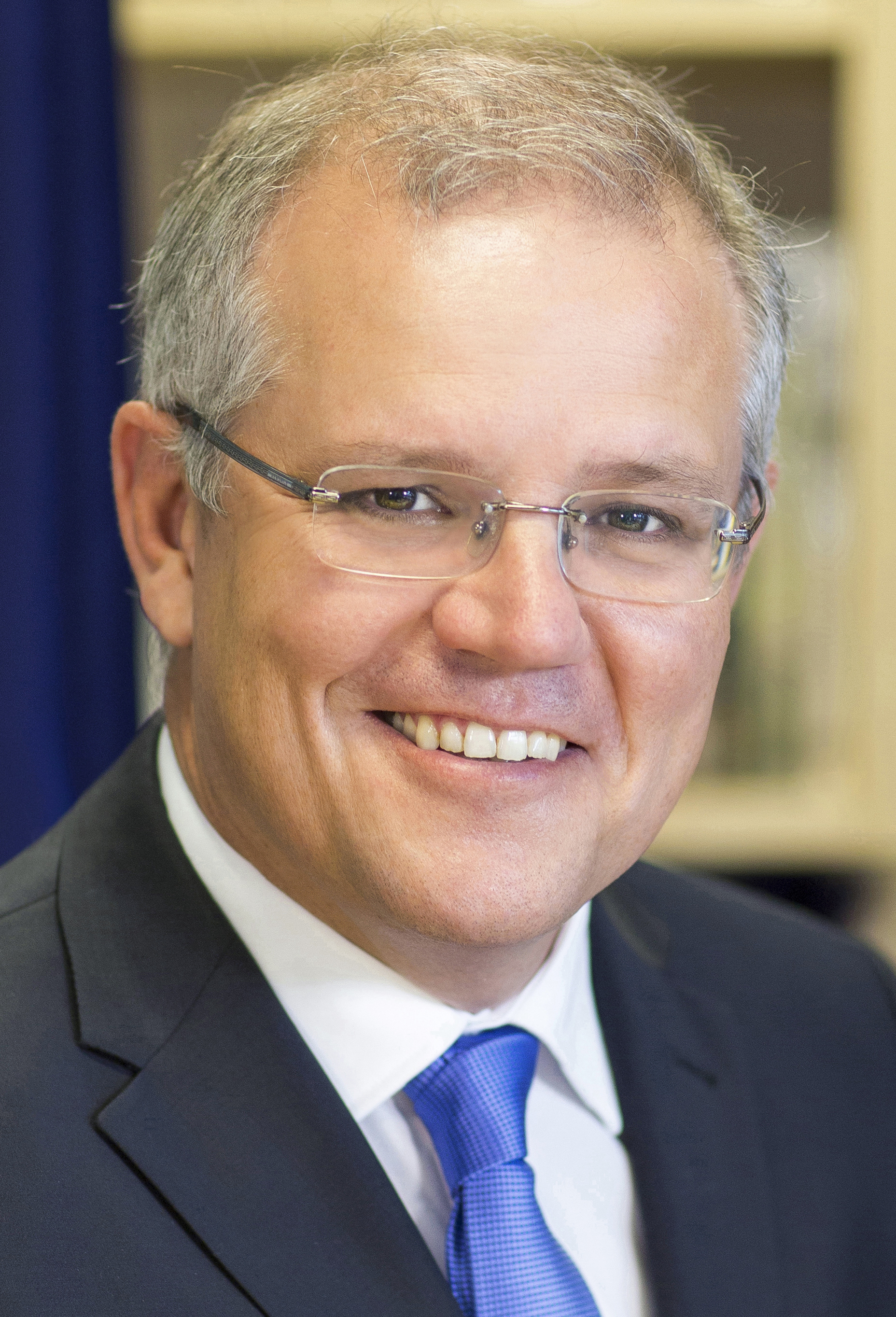
	First party	Second party
Leader	Bill Shorten	Scott Morrison
Party	Labor	Coalition
Last election	2 seats	0 seats
Seats won	2 seats	0 seats
Seat change	Steady	Steady
Popular vote	43,755	38,837
Percentage	42.27%	37.52%
Swing	▲1.88	▲4.27
TPP	54.20%	45.80%
TPP swing	▼2.86	▲2.86
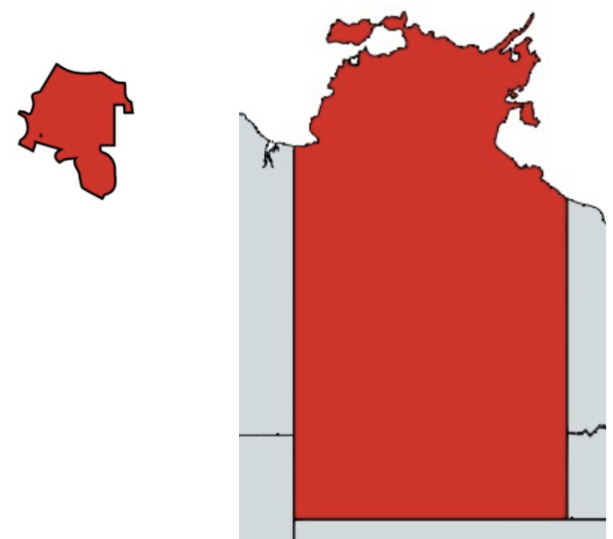
- Results by electorate.

=== Overall results ===
Party	Votes	%	Swing	Seats	Change
Australian Labor Party	43,755	42.27	+1.88	2	Steady
Country Liberal Party	38,837	37.52	+4.27	0	Steady
Australian Greens	10,512	10.15	+1.06		
United Australia Party	2,950	2.85	+2.85		
Rise Up Australia Party	2,657	2.57	+0.02		
Independent	4,807	4.64	−1.24		
Total	103,518			2	
Two-party-preferred vote
Australian Labor Party	56,103	54.20	−2.86	2	Steady
Country Liberal Party	47,415	45.80	+2.86	0	Steady
Invalid/blank votes	5,093	4.69	−2.66		
Registered voters/turnout	139,359	77.94	−1.07		
Source: AEC Tally Room

=== Results by division ===
==== Lingiari ====
2019 Australian federal election: Lingiari
Party	Candidate	Votes	%	±%
Labor	Warren Snowdon	21,698	44.80	+5.04
Country Liberal	Jacinta Price	17,875	36.91	+5.03
Greens	George Hanna	3,991	8.24	+0.50
Independent	Hamish MacFarlane	2,123	4.38	+4.38
Rise Up Australia	Regina McCarthy	1,380	2.85	−0.57
United Australia	Daniel Hodgson	1,367	2.82	+2.82
Total formal votes		48,434	94.95	+2.75
Informal votes		2,575	5.05	−2.75
Turnout		51,009	72.85	−1.11
Two-party-preferred result
Labor	Warren Snowdon	26,863	55.46	−2.73
Country Liberal	Jacinta Price	21,571	44.54	+2.73
Labor hold		Swing	−2.73	

==== Solomon ====
2019 Australian federal election: Solomon
Party	Candidate	Votes	%	±%
Labor	Luke Gosling	22,057	40.04	−0.90
Country Liberal	Kathy Ganley	20,962	38.05	+3.61
Greens	Timothy Parish	6,521	11.84	+1.58
Independent	Sue Fraser-Adams	2,684	4.87	+4.87
United Australia	Raj Samson Rajwin	1,583	2.87	+2.87
Rise Up Australia	Lorraine Gimini	1,277	2.32	+0.53
Total formal votes		55,084	95.63	+2.58
Informal votes		2,518	4.37	−2.58
Turnout		57,602	83.08	−0.95
Two-party-preferred result
Labor	Luke Gosling	29,240	53.08	−3.01
Country Liberal	Kathy Ganley	25,844	46.92	+3.01
Labor hold		Swing	−3.01	
