= Ted Hook =

Australian public servant

Ted Hook CBE

Secretary of the Attorney-General's Department
- In office 3 February 1964 – 2 February 1970

Personal details
- Born: Edwin John Hook; 3 April 1910 Forest Lodge, Sydney, New South Wales
- Died: 2 April 1990 (aged 79) Benowa, Queensland
- Spouse: Valerie Norma Fowler Macmillan (m. 1937–1990; his death)
- Occupation: Public servant

Edwin John "Ted" Hook CBE (3 April 1910 – 2 April 1990) was a senior Australian public servant best known for his time as Secretary of the Attorney-General's Department in the 1960s.

== Life and career ==
Ted Hook was born to English-born parents in Forest Lodge, Sydney on 3 April 1910.

In 1951 Hook joined the Attorney-General's Department. He was promoted quickly in the Department, and took a key role in the development and passage of several major pieces of legislation, including the Marriage Act 1961, and major amendments to the Crimes Act 1914. Between February 1964 and February 1970, Hook was Secretary of the Attorney-General's Department.

Hook retired from the Australian Public Service in 1970 after suffering a stress-related illness.

Hook died on 2 April 1990 in Benowa, Queensland.

== Awards ==
Hook was made a Commander of the Order of the British Empire for service as Secretary of the Attorney-General's Department in January 1967.

Government offices
Preceded by Kenneth Bailey	Secretary of the Attorney-General's Department; 1964 – 1970	Succeeded by Clarrie Harders
