= Kenneth Bailey (lawyer) =

Australian public servant, lawyer and diplomat

Sir Kenneth Bailey CBE QC

Secretary of the Attorney-General's Department
- In office 9 May 1946 – 2 February 1964
- Preceded by: Sir George Knowles
- Succeeded by: Ted Hook

Personal details
- Born: Kenneth Hamilton Bailey; 3 November 1898 Canterbury, Victoria, Australia
- Died: 3 May 1972 (aged 73) Canberra, Australia
- Spouse: Editha Olga Bailey (m. 1925)
- Children: Peter Bailey
- Education: University of Melbourne; Corpus Christi College, Oxford
- Occupation: Public servant, lawyer

Sir Kenneth Hamilton Bailey CBE QC (3 November 1898 – 3 May 1972) was a senior Australian civil servant and lawyer, best known for his time as Secretary of the Attorney-General's Department between 1946 and 1964.

== Life and career ==
Kenneth Bailey was born on 3 November 1898 in Canterbury, Victoria. He was dux of his high school, Wesley College, in 1916. He was Victoria's Rhodes Scholar for 1918, a feat later emulated by his son. Both attended Corpus Christi College, Oxford.

In 1927, Bailey was appointed professor of jurisprudence at the University of Melbourne; the following year becoming the first Australia-born dean of the law school.

Between 1946 and 1964, Bailey was Solicitor-General of Australia and Secretary of the Attorney-General's Department. During his time as Solicitor-General, Bailey officially opened the Australian Police College in Barton on 25 October 1960.

Bailey died on 3 May 1972 in Canberra and was cremated. His son, Peter Hamilton Bailey, was also a public servant, as well as a human rights academic.

== Awards and honours ==
Bailey was appointed a Commander of the Order of the British Empire in June 1953 whilst Permanent Head of the Attorney-General's Department. He was knighted in 1958.

In 1972, the University of Melbourne awarded Bailey an honorary doctorate at a special conferring ceremony at Canberra Hospital. The degree was conferred to recognize his distinguished service to the university.

Government offices
Preceded by George Knowles	Secretary of the Attorney-General's Department; 1946 – 1964	Succeeded by Ted Hook
Diplomatic posts
Preceded by David Hay	Australian High Commissioner to Canada; 1964 – 1969	Succeeded by David McNicoll
