= Clarrie Harders =

Australian public servant (1915–1997)

Sir Clarrie Harders OBE
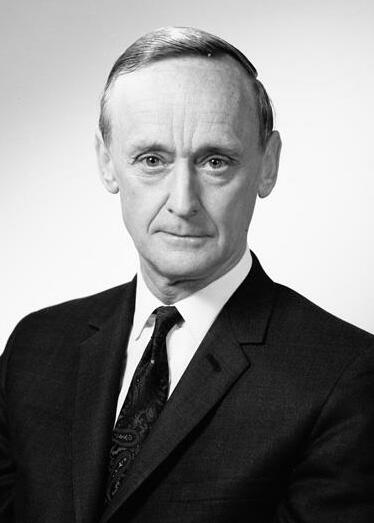
- Harders c. 1969

Secretary of the Attorney-General's Department
- In office 29 June 1970 – 1979

Personal details
- Born: Clarence Waldemar Harders; 1 March 1915
- Died: 22 February 1996 (aged 80)
- Education: University of Adelaide
- Occupation: Public servant

Sir Clarence Waldemar "Clarrie" Harders OBE (1 March 1915 – 22 February 1997) was a senior Australian public servant best known for his time as Secretary of the Attorney-General's Department in the 1970s.

== Life and career ==
Clarrie Harders was born on 1 March 1915.

He was appointed Secretary of the Attorney-General's Department on 29 June 1970.

In 1979, Harders retired from his position as Secretary of the Attorney-General's department and was appointed legal adviser to the Department of Foreign Affairs.

After leaving the Australian Public Service, Harders went on to become a consultant with a major law firm.

Harders died on 22 February 1997.

== Awards ==
Harders was made an Officer of the Order of the British Empire in 1969, whilst Deputy Secretary of the Attorney-General's Department. He was knighted in recognition of his public service in June 1977.

Government offices
Preceded by Ted Hook	Secretary of the Attorney-General's Department; 1970 – 1979	Succeeded by Alan Neaves
