= Pat Brazil =

Australian public servant (1930–2017)

Pat Brazil AO

Secretary of the Attorney-General's Department
- In office 1983–1989

Personal details
- Born: Patrick Brazil; 1930 Fortitude Valley, Queensland
- Died: 28 June 2017 (aged 86–87)
- Spouse: Colleen Morrissey
- Education: University of Queensland
- Occupation: Public servant

Patrick Brazil AO (1930 – 28 June 2017) was an Australian senior public servant. His career included time serving as the head of the Attorney-General's Department between 1983 and 1989.

== Life and career ==
Pat Brazil was born in Fortitude Valley, Queensland in 1930. He was educated in Ipswich at a convent school, and later at the Christian Brothers College. He won a scholarship to study Arts and Law at the University of Queensland.

Brazil moved to Canberra to join the Attorney-General's Department in August 1953.

Between 1983 and 1989, Brazil was Secretary of the Attorney-General's Department. When he resigned from the role, he also resigned from the Australian Public Service.

Brazil died on 28 June 2017.

== Awards ==
Brazil was made an Officer of the Order of Australia in June 1989, in recognition of service to the Public Service as Secretary of the Attorney-General's Department.

Government offices
Preceded by Alan Neaves	Secretary of the Attorney-General's Department; 1983 – 1989	Succeeded by Alan Rose
