= Alan Neaves =

Australian public servant, lawyer and judge

Judge of the Federal Court of Australia
- In office 11 March 1983 – 8 January 1995

Secretary of the Attorney-General's Department
- In office July 1979 – 11 March 1983

Personal details
- Born: Alan Reginald Neaves; 8 January 1925 Glebe, New South Wales, Australia
- Died: 25 November 2022 (aged 97) Canberra, Australia
- Education: University of Sydney
- Occupation: Public servant

Alan Reginald Neaves (8 January 1925 – 25 November 2022) was an Australian public servant, lawyer and judge, best known for his role as head of the Attorney-General's Department between 1979 and 1983, and as a Federal Court judge between 1983 and 1995.

== Life and career ==
Neaves was born in January 1925 in the Sydney suburb of Glebe, the son of Ida Florence née Jones and Henry Neaves.

Neaves joined the Attorney-General's Department in 1942. After war service with the Royal Australian Air Force, he graduated in law with first class honours from the University of Sydney in 1948, and was admitted to the New South Wales Bar in 1949.

In December 1974, Neaves was appointed the next Crown Solicitor, to commence in February 1975. The post came after five years in Sydney as head of the Deputy Crown Solicitor's Office.

He was appointed Secretary of the Attorney-General's Department in July 1979.

In 1980 then Prime Minister Malcolm Fraser set up a Royal Commission into the activities of the Painters and Dockers Union, appointing Frank Costigan as Royal Commissioner. The Costigan Commission inquiry period lasted until 1984, and in the process the Attorney-General's Department came under fire from the Labor Party after criticism by the commission. When the Labor Party was elected and Bob Hawke became Prime Minister, among the new Government's first order of business was to remove Neaves from his position as Secretary of the Attorney-General's Department. He was appointed a judge of the Federal Court on 11 March 1983.

Neaves remained a Judge of the Federal Court until 8 January 1995, when he reached the mandatory retirement age of 70.

Government offices
Preceded by Clarrie Harders	Secretary of the Attorney-General's Department; 1979–1983	Succeeded by Pat Brazil
