= Stephen Skehill =

Australian lawyer and public servant

Secretary of the Attorney-General's Department
- In office 23 May 1994 – 1998

Personal details
- Occupation: Public servant

Stephen Skehill is an Australian lawyer and public servant. Between 1994 and 1998 he was Secretary of the Australian Government Attorney-General's Department. He is currently ethics adviser to the ACT Legislative Assembly.

== Life and career ==
Skehill first joined the Australian Public Service in 1970, in the Department of Labour and National Service.

Between 1970 and 1984, he worked in a range of agencies including the Department of Business and Consumer Affairs, the Trade Practices Commission and the Department of Social Security.

He was appointed a Deputy Secretary of the Attorney-General's Department in 1989, having previously been the First Assistant Secretary of Corporate Services for the Department. In 1994, he became Secretary of the Department, replacing Alan Rose.

In 2011, he was engaged by the Department of Finance and Deregulation to lead a review of small and medium agencies in the Attorney-General's portfolio. In response to the review, which came to be known as the Skehill Review, federal courts adopted a comprehensive shared services model and some functions were merged.

In 2008, Skehill was appointed ethics and integrity advisor to the ACT Legislative Assembly, a new role. In 2014 in the role, Skehill recommended a register and code of ethics for lobbyists in the ACT. He has also been available part-time to provide ethics and integrity advice to MLAs.

Government offices
Preceded by Alan Rose	Secretary of the Attorney-General's Department; 1994 – 1998	Succeeded by Tony Blunn
