= George Knowles =

Australian public servant and diplomat

Sir George Knowles CBE

Secretary of the Attorney-General's Department
- In office 10 February 1932 – 8 May 1946
- Preceded by: Sir Robert Garran
- Succeeded by: Kenneth Bailey

High Commissioner of Australia to South Africa
- In office 3 September 1946 – 22 November 1947
- Preceded by: New office
- Succeeded by: Alfred Stirling

Personal details
- Born: George Shaw Knowles; 14 March 1882 Toowong, Queensland, Australia
- Died: 22 November 1947 (aged 65) Pretoria, South Africa
- Resting place: Woden Cemetery
- Spouse: Eleanor Bennett (m. 1908)
- Occupation: Public servant and diplomat

Sir George Shaw Knowles CBE (14 March 1882 – 22 November 1947) was an Australian public servant and diplomat. He served as departmental secretary of the Attorney-General's Department from 1932 to 1946, and was then the inaugural Australian High Commissioner to South Africa from 1946 until his death the following year.

== Early life ==
Knowles was born in Toowong, Brisbane, Queensland, on 14 March 1882. He was the son of Mary (née Cocks) and George Hopley Knowles; his father was born in Staffordshire, England, while his mother was a native Queenslander. He was educated at Warwick West Boys' School and Toowoomba Grammar School.

== Public service career ==
In 1898, Knowles joined the Queensland Public Service as a junior clerk, initially working in the Stock Department and later in the Attorney-General's Department. He attended night classes in accountancy at Brisbane Central Technical College.

Knowles joined the Commonwealth Public Service in 1902 as a clerk in the Australian National Audit Office. This required him to move to Melbourne, the temporary capital. He transferred to the Australian Patent Office in 1904, and then to the Attorney-General's Department. Knowles attended evening classes at the University of Melbourne, graduating with Bachelor of Laws (1907), Master of Laws (1908), Bachelor of Arts (1910), and Master of Arts (1912) degrees. In 1916, Knowles was admitted as barrister and solicitor of the High Court.

In 1930, Knowles was appointed to the first Council of the Canberra University College, holding the position continuously until his resignation in 1946, when he left to take on an appointment as Australia's first Australian High Commissioner to South Africa. He and Lady Knowles journeyed to the post on the steamer Nestor, departing 5 July 1946.

Between 1932 and 1946, Knowles held the positions of Solicitor-General of the Commonwealth, Secretary of the Attorney-General's Department and Parliamentary Draftsman.

== High Commissioner to South Africa ==
Knowles was due to retire from the public service in March 1947 (his 65th birthday), but in April 1946 the federal government chose him as the inaugural Australian High Commissioner to South Africa. It was generally understood that Attorney-General H. V. Evatt pushed for the appointment so that he could install his own man, Kenneth Bailey, as departmental secretary. Knowles arrived in Durban in late July and was formally received by Governor-General Gideon Brand van Zyl on 3 September. He was given credentials to present, but did not do so after being informed that it was the South African government's policy that they should not be presented by diplomatic representatives of dominions. Knowles was given no brief by the Australian government, and when he requested written instructions was told that the government had no policy towards South Africa. He proposed to send dispatches back to Australia every two weeks, but in his 16 months in the position eventually sent 160 dispatches, most of which he wrote personally.

Knowles died in Pretoria on 22 November 1947, while still in office as Australian High Commissioner to South Africa. The South African Government arranged a State funeral to celebrate his life and work. After the funeral, his body was returned to Australia, and his remains were interred at Woden Cemetery.

== Awards and honours ==
In October 1920, Knowles was made an Officer of the Order of the British Empire. He was promoted to Commander of the Order in the 1928 Birthday Honours whilst a draftsman in the Attorney-General's Department. In January 1939, whilst serving as Solicitor-General, Knowles was knighted.

In 1950, Lady Knowles donated money to the Council of the Canberra University College to provide an academic prize memorialising her late husband. In 1964, Knowles Place in City, Australian Capital Territory, site of the Canberra Law Courts, was named in honour of George Knowles.

Government offices
Preceded by Robert Garran	Secretary of the Attorney-General's Department; 1932 – 1946	Succeeded by Kenneth Bailey
Diplomatic posts
New title Position established	Australian High Commissioner to South Africa; 1946 – 1947	Succeeded by Alfred Stirling
