= Gai Brodtmann =

Australian politician (born 1963)

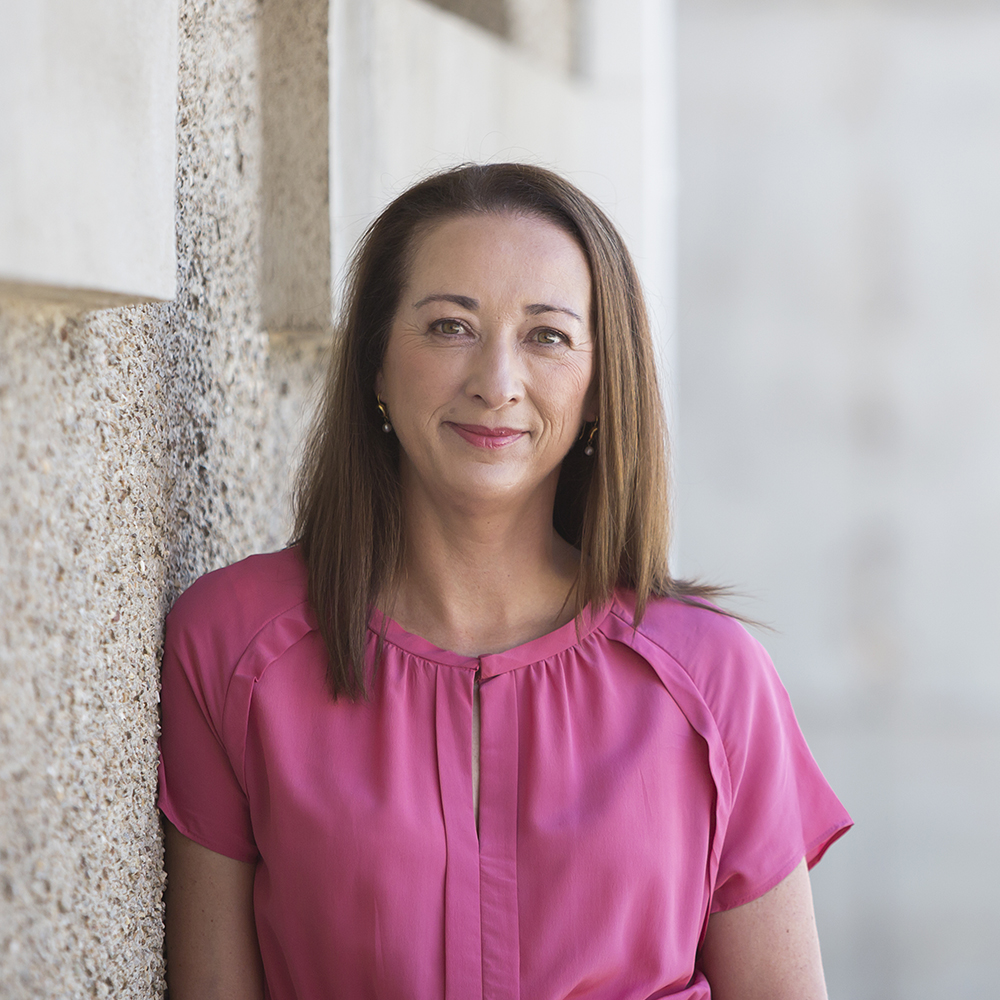

Member of the Australian Parliament for Canberra
- In office 21 August 2010 – 11 April 2019
- Preceded by: Annette Ellis
- Succeeded by: Alicia Payne

Personal details
- Born: Gai Marie Brodtmann; 24 November 1963 (age 62) Melbourne, Victoria, Australia
- Party: Labor
- Spouse: Chris Uhlmann
- Education: Australian National University; Royal Melbourne Institute of Technology; Monash University

Gai Marie Brodtmann (born 24 November 1963) is an Australian former politician who served as a member of the House of Representatives for the seat of Canberra representing the Labor Party from 2010 until 2019. A career public servant, diplomat and later small business owner, she succeeded Labor MP Annette Ellis, who retired from politics at the 2010 federal election. Like Ellis, Brodtmann was aligned with the Right faction. Appointed Shadow Parliamentary Secretary for Defence following the 2013 Election, Brodtmann was the Shadow Assistant Minister for Cyber Security and Defence in the Outer Shadow Cabinet after the 2016 election. As at 2021, Gai is a member of the think tank Australian Strategic Policy Institute council, which is funded by the Australian Department of Defence along with overseas governments, and defence and technology companies.

== Early career ==
Brodtmann was born in Melbourne and has two younger sisters. She graduated with a Bachelor of Arts from the Australian National University, a Bachelor of Public Relations from the Royal Melbourne Institute of Technology and a graduate certificate in business from Monash University.

Brodtmann worked as a public servant at the Attorney-General's Department and later at the Department of Foreign Affairs and Trade. During her public service career she represented Australia in India, was part of the delegation that normalised relations with Iran, and worked on a range of international and national issues, from Indigenous youth development and climate change to defence capability, tax and foreign policy. Brodtmann lost her position at DFAT in 1996 when the incoming federal government of John Howard cut 15,000 permanent public servant positions in the ACT.

She subsequently ran her own small business offering media communication services to organisations such as the Australian Defence Force and the Department of Climate Change and Energy Efficiency.

== Political career ==
Brodtmann was elected the Member for Canberra on 21 August 2010. In October 2013, she was appointed to Opposition Leader Bill Shorten's outer shadow cabinet as Shadow Parliamentary Secretary for Defence, sharing portfolio responsibilities with Shadow Defence Minister, Stephen Conroy, and Shadow Assistant Minister, David Feeney. In July 2016, following the 2016 election, Brodtmann was appointed Shadow Assistant Minister for Cyber Security and Defence Personnel.

As a volunteer director on the Gift of Life and Our Wellness boards, Brodtmann helped to lift the profile of organ donation and raised funds for better health services in Canberra. She is a former director and audit committee member of the Cultural Facilities Corporation and ACTTAB, and a former director of the National Press Club.

Brodtmann is the founding co-chair of the Parliamentary Friends of Defence and the Parliamentary Friends of Endometriosis Awareness.

In August 2018, Brodtmann announced she would retire from politics at the next federal election.

== Personal life ==
A long-time Canberra resident, Brodtmann is married to Nine News journalist Chris Uhlmann. She is of Chinese, German, Irish and Scottish ancestry.

Parliament of Australia
Preceded by Annette Ellis	Member for Canberra; 2010–2019	Succeeded by Alicia Payne
