= Attorney-General's Department (Australia) =

Federal attorney-general department of the Australian Government

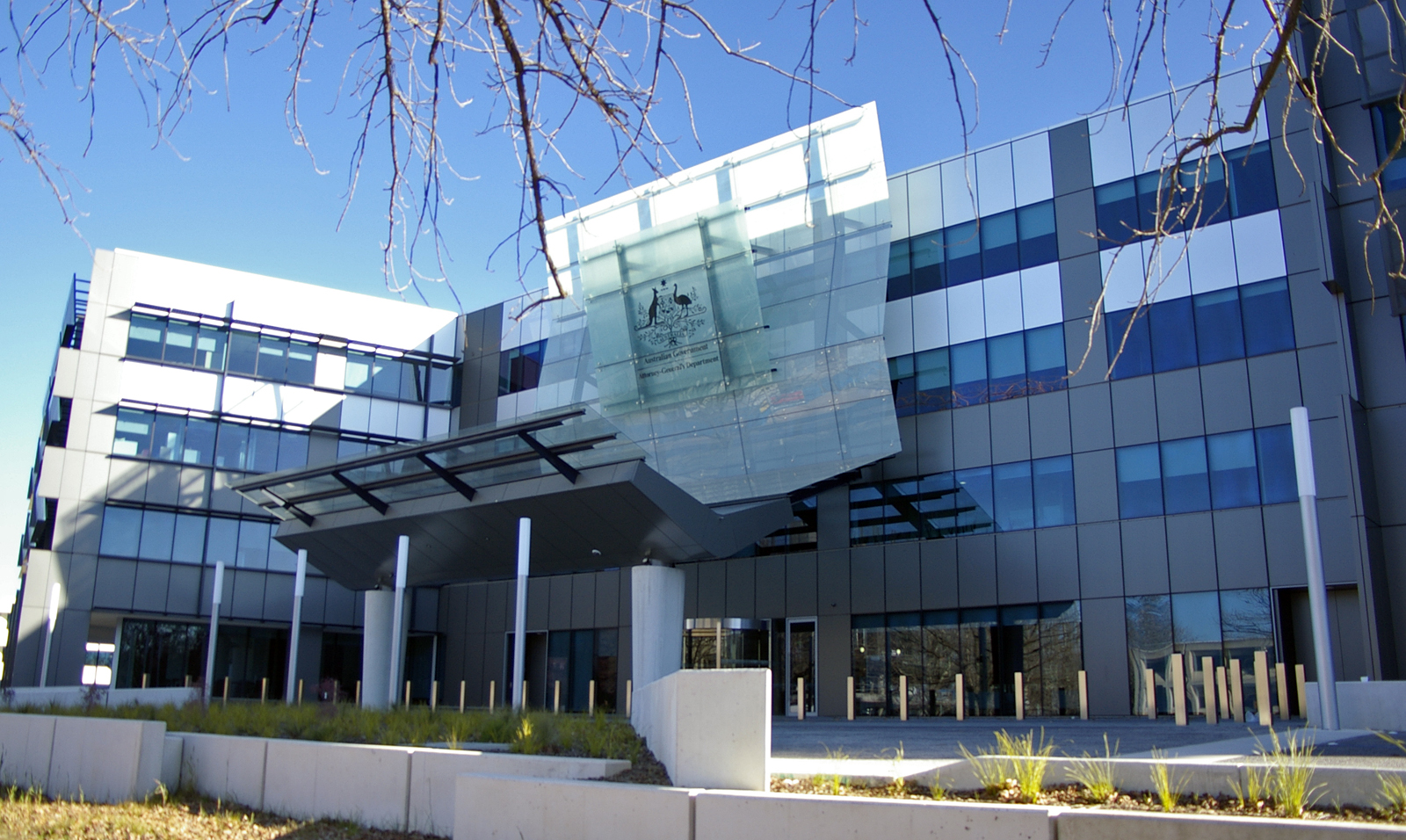
- Robert Garran Offices, head office of the Attorney-General's Department, Barton, Australian Capital Territory

Department overview
- Formed: 1 January 1901
- Jurisdiction: Commonwealth of Australia
- Employees: 1,195 (estimate for 2024–25)
- Annual budget: A$1.138 billion (2024–25)
- Minister responsible: Michelle Rowland, Attorney-General of Australia
- Department executive: Katherine Jones PSM, Secretary (2021–present)
- Child agencies: Administrative Review Tribunal; Australian Human Rights Commission; Australian Financial Security Authority; Australian Law Reform Commission; Office of the Commonwealth Director of Public Prosecutions; Federal Circuit and Family Court of Australia; Federal Court of Australia; High Court of Australia; Independent National Security Legislation Monitor; Inspector-General of Intelligence and Security; National Anti-Corruption Commission; Office of the Australian Information Commissioner; Office of the Commonwealth Ombudsman; Office of the Special Investigator
- Website: www.ag.gov.au
- Agency ID: NAA CA 5

The Attorney-General's Department, also known as the Department of the Attorney-General, is the law enforcement and justice department of the Australian Government. The department is responsible for improving Australia's federal law and judicial framework and provides legal advice and services to the Australian Government. The department also oversees various statutory authorities and child agencies including the Australian Human Rights Commission (AHRC) and the Director of Public Prosecutions.

The head of the department is Attorney-General for Australia, currently Michelle Rowland, who is assisted by the Secretary of the Attorney-General's Department, currently Katherine Jones PSM.

== History ==
The Attorney-General's Department is one of seven original Commonwealth Departments of state, commencing with the Commonwealth of Australia on 1 January 1901. It is one of only three departments, along with Defence and Treasury, to have operated continuously under their original name and charter since Federation.

== Organisation ==
The department is organised into five groups, each headed by a Deputy Secretary. These Deputy Secretaries report to the Secretary who co-ordinates and devises departmental structure and policy.

These five groups are:

- Australian Government Solicitor
- Justice and Communities
- National Security and Criminal Justice
- Integrity and International
- Enabling Services.

The Attorney-General's Department is located at the Robert Garran Offices, 3-5 National Circuit, Barton in the Australian Capital Territory.

=== Departmental Secretary ===
The permanent secretary of the Attorney-General's Department is the non-political public service head of the department. This role dates from federation, and the first incumbent, Sir Robert Garran, was the first (and for a time the only) public servant employed by the federal government. In that role, he was responsible for overseeing the first federal election and setting up the rest of the federal bureaucracy by transferring state government functions to the federal government.

From 1916, when the position of Solicitor-General of Australia was created as the second law officer and deputy of the Attorney-General, the permanent secretary served concurrently as Solicitor-General, until the two roles were separated in 1964. Under the Law Officers Act passed that year, the Solicitor-General's role was clarified as statutory counsel deputising for the Attorney-General, separate from the role of the permanent secretary.

On the recommendation of the Prime Minister, the Governor-General has appointed the following individuals as Secretary of the department:

Order	Official	Official title	Date appointment commenced	Date appointment ceased	Term in office	Ref(s)
1	Sir Robert Garran	Secretary of the Attorney‑General's Department	1 January 1901	9 February 1932	31 years, 39 days	
2	Sir George Knowles	Secretary of the Attorney‑General's Department	10 February 1932	8 May 1946	14 years, 87 days	
3	Sir Kenneth Bailey	Secretary of the Attorney‑General's Department	9 May 1946	2 February 1964	17 years, 269 days	
4	Ted Hook	Secretary of the Attorney‑General's Department	3 February 1964	2 February 1970	5 years, 364 days	
5	Sir Clarrie Harders OBE	Secretary of the Attorney‑General's Department	1970	July 1979	9 years	
6	Alan Neaves	Secretary of the Attorney‑General's Department	July 1979	March 1983	4 years	
7	Pat Brazil AO	Secretary of the Attorney‑General's Department	16 March 1983	1989	6 years	
8	Alan Rose AO	Secretary of the Attorney‑General's Department	1989	23 May 1994	5 years	
9	Stephen Skehill	Secretary of the Attorney‑General's Department	23 May 1994	1998	4 years	
10	Tony Blunn AO	Secretary of the Attorney‑General's Department	1998	17 December 1999	2 years	
11	Robert Cornall AO	Secretary of the Attorney‑General's Department	24 January 2000	31 August 2008	8 years, 220 days	
12	Roger Wilkins AO	Secretary of the Attorney‑General's Department	1 September 2008	31 August 2014	5 years, 364 days	
13	Chris Moraitis PSM	Secretary of the Attorney‑General's Department	15 September 2014	15 September 2021	6 years, 110 days	
14	Katherine Jones PSM	Secretary of the Attorney‑General's Department	16 August 2021	incumbent	5 years, 91 days	

== Mission and outcomes ==
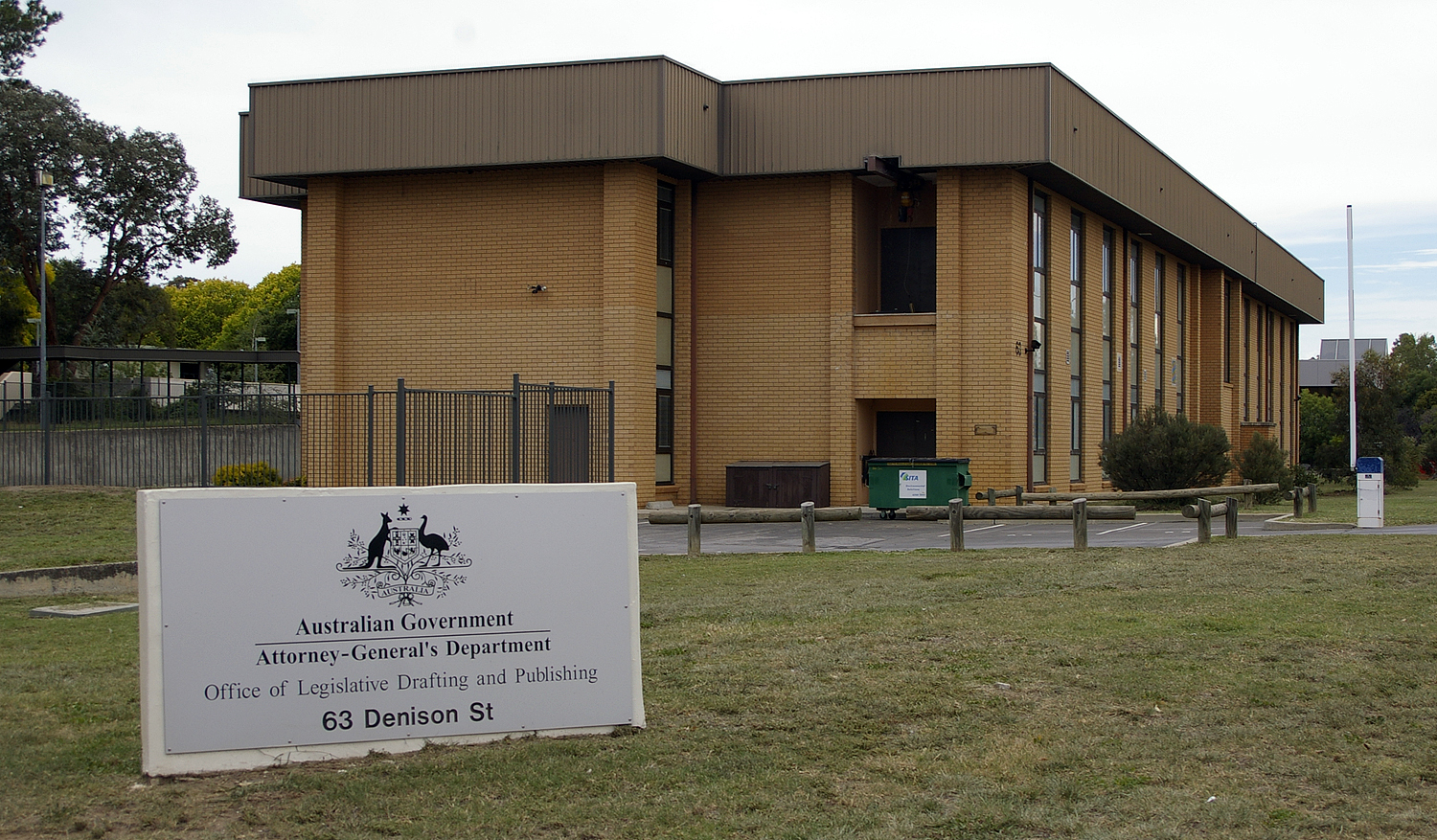
The former Office of Legislative Drafting and Publishing building in Deakin, ACT. The Office was once a division of the Attorney-General's Department.

The mission of the department is to "deliver programs and policies to maintain and improve Australia's law and justice framework" and to provide legal services to the Australian Government.

== Operational functions ==
In an Administrative Arrangements Order made on 13 May 2025, the functions of the department were broadly classified into the following matters:

- Law and justice, including -
  - Administrative law
  - Alternative dispute resolution
  - Constitutional law
  - Courts and tribunals
  - Human rights
  - International law
  - Law reform
  - Legal assistance
  - Legislative drafting
  - Marriage and family law
- Legal services to the Commonwealth
- Administration of criminal justice, including –
  - Criminal law policy and principles of criminal responsibility
  - Matters relating to prosecution
  - Sentencing and management of federal offenders
  - Internal crime co-operation, including extradition and mutual assistance in criminal matters
- Identity and biometrics
- Administrative support for Royal Commissions and certain other inquiries
- Privacy
- Freedom of Information
- Native title
- Fraud and anti-corruption policy
- Whole of government integrity policy and activities
- Copyright
- National child protection policy and strategy
- Modern Slavery

== See also ==
- Attorney-General's Department (South Australia)
- National Council for Fire & Emergency Services
- List of Australian Commonwealth Government entities
