= Second Rudd ministry =

67th ministry of government of Australia

- 67th ministry of Australia

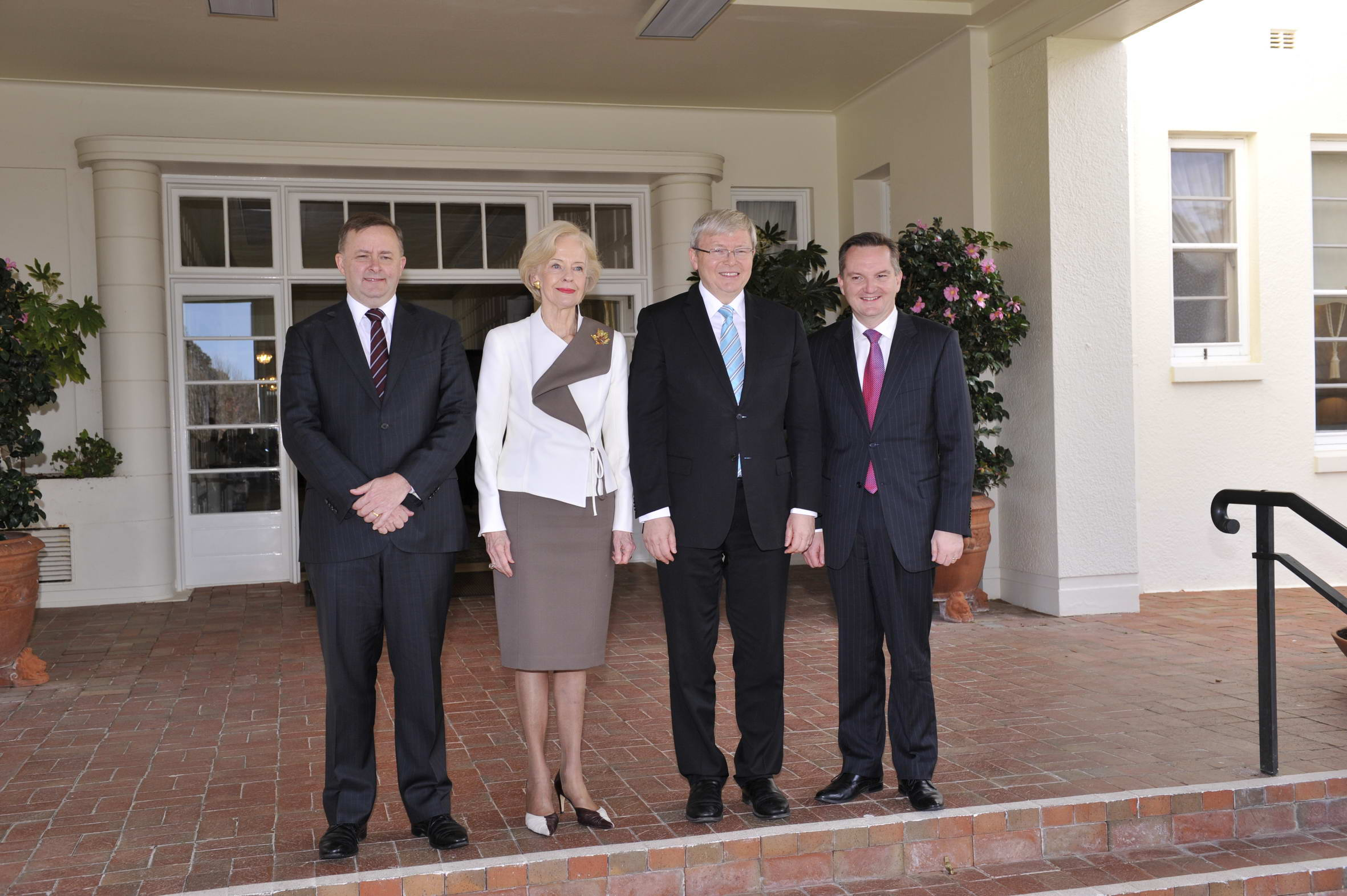
- Governor-General Quentin Bryce with newly sworn in ministers: PM Kevin Rudd, Deputy PM Anthony Albanese and Treasurer Chris Bowen
- Date formed: 27 June 2013
- Date dissolved: 18 September 2013

People and organisations
- Monarch: Elizabeth II
- Governor-General: Quentin Bryce
- Prime Minister: Kevin Rudd
- Deputy Prime Minister: Anthony Albanese
- Member party: Labor
- Status in legislature: Minority government
- Opposition cabinet: Abbott
- Opposition party: Liberal/National Coalition
- Opposition leader: Tony Abbott

History
- Outgoing election: 7 September 2013
- Legislature term: 43rd
- Predecessor: Second Gillard ministry
- Successor: Abbott ministry

The second Rudd ministry (Labor) was the 67th ministry of the Australian government, led by Prime Minister Kevin Rudd. It succeeded the second Gillard ministry after a leadership spill within the Australian Labor Party that took place on 26 June 2013. Three members of the ministry were sworn in by Governor-General Quentin Bryce on 27 June 2013. These were Kevin Rudd, Prime Minister; Anthony Albanese, Deputy Prime Minister; and Chris Bowen, Treasurer. The remainder of the ministry were sworn in on 1 July 2013.

The Labor Party lost the general election held on 7 September 2013, paving the way for Coalition leader Tony Abbott. The ministry concluded on 18 September 2013 when the Abbott ministry was sworn in.

== 27 June 2013 – 18 September 2013 ==
=== Cabinet ===
Officeholder	Office(s)
Kevin Rudd MP	Prime Minister
Anthony Albanese MP	Deputy Prime Minister; Minister for Infrastructure and Transport; Minister for Broadband, Communications and the Digital Economy; Leader of the House
Senator Penny Wong	Minister for Finance and Deregulation; Leader of the Government in the Senate
Chris Bowen MP	Treasurer
Stephen Smith MP	Minister for Defence; Deputy Leader of the House
Senator Bob Carr	Minister for Foreign Affairs
Bill Shorten MP	Minister for Education; Minister for Workplace Relations
Senator Kim Carr	Minister for Innovation, Industry, Science and Research; Minister for Higher Education
Mark Butler MP	Minister for Environment, Heritage and Water; Minister for Climate Change
Gary Gray MP	Minister for Resources and Energy; Minister for Tourism; Minister for Small Business
Mark Dreyfus MP	Attorney-General; Minister for Emergency Management; Special Minister of State; Minister for the Public Service and Integrity
Joel Fitzgibbon MP	Minister for Agriculture, Fisheries and Forestry
Tanya Plibersek MP	Minister for Health and Medical Research
Jenny Macklin MP	Minister for Families, Community Services and Indigenous Affairs; Minister for Disability Reform
Senator Jacinta Collins	Minister for Mental Health and Ageing; Manager of Government Business in the Senate; Deputy Leader of the Government in the Senate
Brendan O'Connor MP	Minister for Employment; Minister for Skills and Training
Tony Burke MP	Minister for Immigration, Multiculturalism and Citizenship; Minister for the Arts; Vice-President of the Executive Council
Richard Marles MP	Minister for Trade
Julie Collins MP	Minister for Housing and Homelessness; Minister for the Status of Women; Minister for Community Services; Minister for Indigenous Employment and Economic Development
Catherine King MP	Minister for Regional Australia, Local Government and Territories

=== Outer ministry ===
Officeholder	Office(s)
Jason Clare MP	Minister for Home Affairs; Minister for Justice
Kate Ellis MP	Minister for Early Childhood, Childcare and Youth; Minister for Employment Participation
Warren Snowdon MP	Minister for Indigenous Health; Minister for Defence Science and Personnel; Minister for Veterans' Affairs; Minister assisting the Prime Minister on the Centenary of ANZAC
David Bradbury MP	Assistant Treasurer; Minister for Competition Policy and Consumer Affairs; Minister Assisting for Deregulation; Minister Assisting for Financial Services and Superannuation
Senator Kate Lundy	Minister for Multicultural Affairs; Minister Assisting for Innovation and Industry; Minister Assisting for the Digital Economy
Mike Kelly MP	Minister for Defence Materiel
Senator Jan McLucas	Minister for Human Services
Senator Don Farrell	Minister for Sport; Minister Assisting on Tourism
Sharon Bird MP	Minister for Regional Development; Minister for Regional Communications; Minister for Road Safety
Melissa Parke MP	Minister for International Development

=== Parliamentary secretaries ===
Officeholder	Office(s)
Senator David Feeney	Parliamentary Secretary for Defence
Sid Sidebottom MP	Parliamentary Secretary for Agriculture, Fisheries and Forestry
Bernie Ripoll MP	Parliamentary Secretary to the Treasurer; Parliamentary Secretary for Small Business
Yvette D'Ath MP	Parliamentary Secretary for Climate Change, Innovation and Industry
Kelvin Thomson MP	Parliamentary Secretary for Schools
Amanda Rishworth MP	Parliamentary Secretary for Environment and Urban Water; Parliamentary Secretary for Disabilities and Carers
Shayne Neumann MP	Parliamentary Secretary to the Attorney-General; Parliamentary Secretary for Health and Ageing
Michael Danby MP	Parliamentary Secretary for the Arts
Alan Griffin MP	Cabinet Secretary; Parliamentary Secretary to the Prime Minister
Ed Husic MP	Parliamentary Secretary to the Prime Minister; Parliamentary Secretary for Broadband
Senator Matt Thistlethwaite	Parliamentary Secretary for Pacific Island Affairs; Parliamentary Secretary for Multicultural Affairs; Parliamentary Secretary for Infrastructure and Transport
Senator Doug Cameron	Parliamentary Secretary for Housing and Homelessness

== See also ==
- Rudd government (2013)
