= Abbott ministry =

Australian government, 2013–2015

- 68th Ministry of Australia

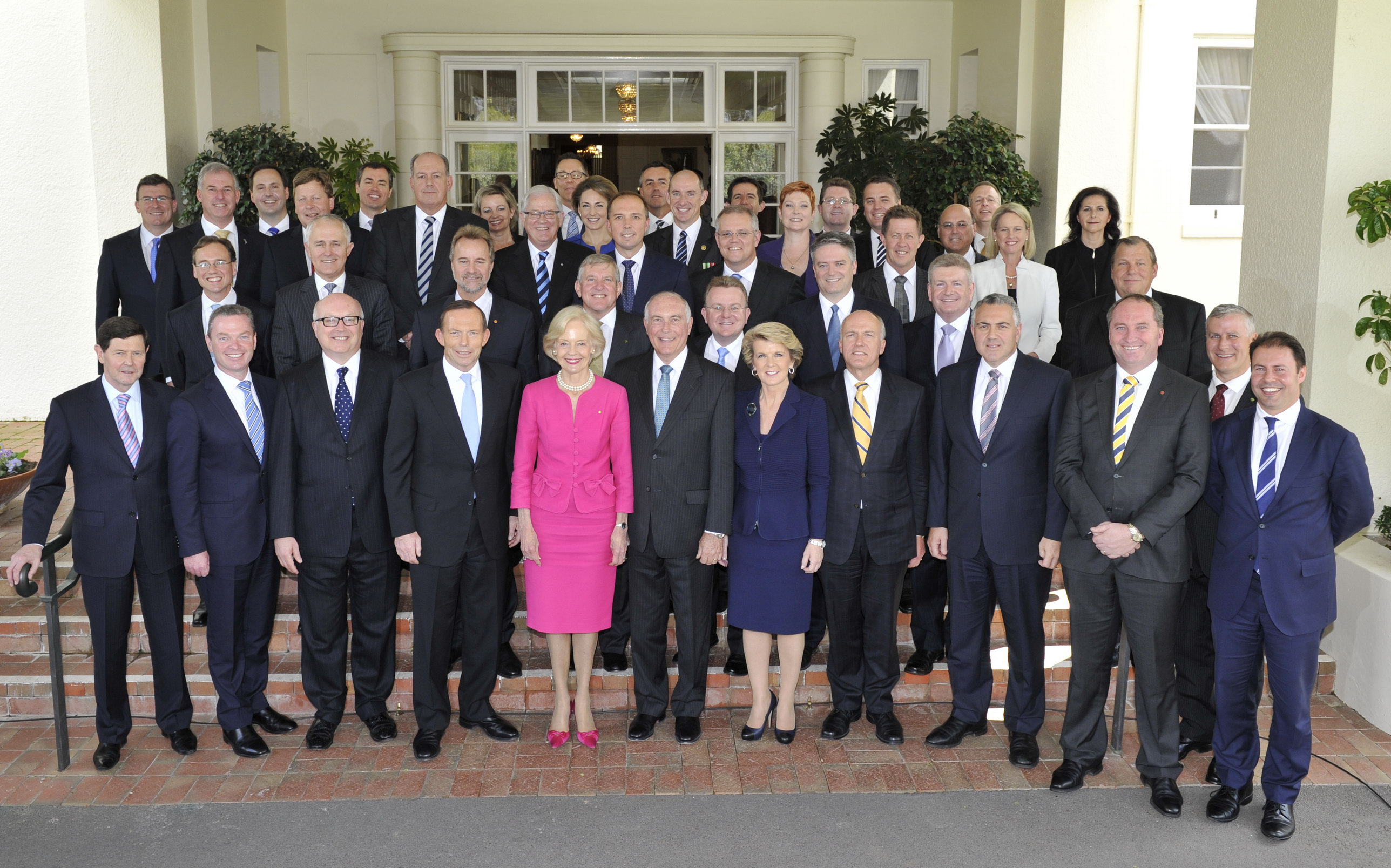
- Governor-General Quentin Bryce with the Abbott ministry
- Date formed: 18 September 2013
- Date dissolved: 15 September 2015

People and organisations
- Monarch: Elizabeth II
- Governor-General: Dame Quentin Bryce; Sir Peter Cosgrove
- Prime Minister: Tony Abbott
- Deputy Prime Minister: Warren Truss
- No. of ministers: 30
- Member party: Liberal–National coalition
- Status in legislature: Coalition majority government
- Opposition cabinet: Shorten
- Opposition party: Labor
- Opposition leader: Chris Bowen (acting); Bill Shorten

History
- Election: 7 September 2013
- Legislature term: 44th
- Predecessor: Second Rudd ministry
- Successor: First Turnbull ministry

The Abbott ministry (Liberal–National Coalition) was the 68th ministry of the Government of Australia. It succeeded the second Rudd ministry after a federal election that took place on 7 September 2013. It was led by Prime Minister, Tony Abbott.

Abbott announced his first ministry on 16 September 2013, and the ministry was sworn in by the Governor-General on 18 September. Abbott expressed regret at the low number of women in cabinet, but still received strong criticism on the lack of female representation in the ministry, including from members of his own party. Abbott added a second woman to his cabinet in Sussan Ley following a reshuffle announced on 21 December 2014, and sworn in on 23 December.

Following the defeat of Abbott by Malcolm Turnbull in the Liberal leadership spill of 14 September 2015, the ministry was replaced by the first Turnbull ministry.

== First arrangement ==
The initial arrangement of the Abbott ministry remained virtually^{a} unchanged from the initial swearing-in of the Cabinet on 18 September 2013 until the reshuffle that was announced on 23 December 2014.

=== Cabinet ===
Party	Minister	Portfolio
Liberal	Tony Abbott MP	Prime Minister; Leader of the Liberal Party
LNP	Warren Truss MP	Deputy Prime Minister; Minister for Infrastructure and Regional Development; Leader of The Nationals
Liberal	Julie Bishop MP	Minister for Foreign Affairs; Deputy Leader of the Liberal Party
Liberal	Senator Eric Abetz	Minister for Employment; Minister Assisting the Prime Minister on the Public Service; Leader of the Government in the Senate
LNP	Senator George Brandis	Attorney-General; Minister for the Arts; Vice-President of the Executive Council; Deputy Leader of the Government in the Senate
Liberal	Joe Hockey MP	Treasurer
National	Barnaby Joyce MP	Minister for Agriculture; Deputy Leader of the Nationals
Liberal	Christopher Pyne MP	Minister for Education; Leader of the House
CLP	Senator Nigel Scullion	Minister for Indigenous Affairs; Leader of the Nationals in the Senate
LNP	Ian Macfarlane MP	Minister for Industry
Liberal	Kevin Andrews MP	Minister for Social Services
Liberal	Malcolm Turnbull MP	Minister for Communications
LNP	Peter Dutton MP	Minister for Health; Minister for Sport
Liberal	Bruce Billson MP	Minister for Small Business
Liberal	Andrew Robb MP	Minister for Trade and Investment
Liberal	Senator David Johnston	Minister for Defence
Liberal	Greg Hunt MP	Minister for the Environment
Liberal	Scott Morrison MP	Minister for Immigration and Border Protection
Liberal	Senator Mathias Cormann^{a}	Minister for Finance

=== Outer ministry ===
Party	Minister	Portfolio
Liberal	Senator Mitch Fifield	Assistant Minister for Social Services; Manager of Government Business in the Senate
National	Senator Fiona Nash MP	Assistant Minister for Health; Deputy Leader of The Nationals in The Senate
National	Luke Hartsuyker MP	Assistant Minister for Employment; Deputy Leader of the House
Liberal	Senator Michael Ronaldson	Minister for Veterans' Affairs; Minister Assisting the Prime Minister for the Centenary of ANZAC; Special Minister of State
Liberal	Sussan Ley MP	Assistant Minister for Education
Liberal	Senator Marise Payne	Minister for Human Services
Liberal	Michael Keenan MP	Minister for Justice
LNP	Stuart Robert MP	Assistant Minister for Defence
Liberal	Senator Michaelia Cash	Assistant Minister for Immigration and Border Protection; Minister Assisting the Prime Minister for Women
Liberal	Jamie Briggs MP	Assistant Minister for Infrastructure and Regional Development
Liberal	Senator Arthur Sinodinos^{a}	Assistant Treasurer

=== Parliamentary secretaries ===
Party	Minister	Portfolio
Liberal	Senator Richard Colbeck	Parliamentary Secretary to the Minister for Agriculture
Liberal	Bob Baldwin MP	Parliamentary Secretary to the Minister for Industry
LNP	Senator Brett Mason	Parliamentary Secretary to the Minister for Foreign Affairs
LNP	Steven Ciobo MP	Parliamentary Secretary to the Treasurer
Liberal	Senator Concetta Fierravanti-Wells	Parliamentary Secretary to the Minister for Social Services
Liberal	Senator Simon Birmingham	Parliamentary Secretary to the Minister for the Environment
Liberal	Senator Scott Ryan	Parliamentary Secretary to the Minister for Education
National	Darren Chester MP	Parliamentary Secretary to the Minister for Defence
Liberal	Paul Fletcher MP	Parliamentary Secretary to the Minister for Communications
Liberal	Josh Frydenberg MP	Parliamentary Secretary to the Prime Minister
Liberal	Alan Tudge MP	Parliamentary Secretary to the Prime Minister
National	Michael McCormack MP	Parliamentary Secretary to the Minister for Finance

== Second arrangement ==
The second arrangement of the Abbott ministry was sworn in on 23 December 2014 following a reshuffle announced on 21 December.

=== Cabinet ===
Party	Minister	Portfolio
Liberal	Tony Abbott MP	Prime Minister; Leader of the Liberal Party
LNP	Warren Truss MP	Deputy Prime Minister; Minister for Infrastructure and Regional Development; Leader of the Nationals
Liberal	Julie Bishop MP	Minister for Foreign Affairs; Deputy Leader of the Liberal Party
Liberal	Senator Eric Abetz	Minister for Employment; Minister Assisting the Prime Minister on the Public Service; Leader of the Government in the Senate
LNP	Senator George Brandis	Attorney-General; Minister for the Arts; Vice-President of the Executive Council; Deputy Leader of the Government in the Senate
Liberal	Joe Hockey MP	Treasurer
National	Barnaby Joyce MP	Minister for Agriculture; Deputy Leader of the Nationals
Liberal	Christopher Pyne MP	Minister for Education and Training; Leader of the House
CLP	Senator Nigel Scullion	Minister for Indigenous Affairs; Leader of the Nationals in the Senate
LNP	Ian Macfarlane MP	Minister for Industry and Science
Liberal	Scott Morrison MP	Minister for Social Services
Liberal	Malcolm Turnbull MP^{b}	Minister for Communications
Liberal	Sussan Ley MP	Minister for Health; Minister for Sport
Liberal	Bruce Billson MP	Minister for Small Business
Liberal	Andrew Robb MP	Minister for Trade and Investment
Liberal	Kevin Andrews MP	Minister for Defence
Liberal	Greg Hunt MP	Minister for the Environment
LNP	Peter Dutton MP	Minister for Immigration and Border Protection
Liberal	Senator Mathias Cormann	Minister for Finance

=== Outer ministry ===
Party	Minister	Portfolio
Liberal	Senator Mitch Fifield	Assistant Minister for Social Services; Manager of Government Business in the Senate
National	Senator Fiona Nash	Assistant Minister for Health; Deputy Leader of The Nationals in The Senate
National	Luke Hartsuyker MP	Assistant Minister for Employment; Deputy Leader of the House
Liberal	Senator Michael Ronaldson	Minister for Veterans' Affairs; Minister Assisting the Prime Minister for the Centenary of ANZAC; Special Minister of State
Liberal	Senator Simon Birmingham	Assistant Minister for Education and Training
Liberal	Senator Marise Payne	Minister for Human Services
Liberal	Michael Keenan MP	Minister for Justice
LNP	Stuart Robert MP	Assistant Minister for Defence
Liberal	Senator Michaelia Cash	Assistant Minister for Immigration and Border Protection; Minister Assisting the Prime Minister for Women
Liberal	Jamie Briggs MP	Assistant Minister for Infrastructure and Regional Development
Liberal	Josh Frydenberg MP	Assistant Treasurer

=== Parliamentary secretaries ===
Party	Minister	Portfolio
Liberal	Senator Richard Colbeck	Parliamentary Secretary to the Minister for Agriculture
LNP	Karen Andrews MP	Parliamentary Secretary to the Minister for Industry and Science
LNP	Steven Ciobo MP	Parliamentary Secretary to the Minister for Foreign Affairs; Parliamentary Secretary to the Minister for Trade and Investment
Liberal	Kelly O'Dwyer MP	Parliamentary Secretary to the Treasurer
Liberal	Senator Concetta Fierravanti-Wells	Parliamentary Secretary to the Minister for Social Services
Liberal	Bob Baldwin MP	Parliamentary Secretary to the Minister for the Environment
Liberal	Senator Scott Ryan	Parliamentary Secretary to the Minister for Education and Training
National	Darren Chester MP	Parliamentary Secretary to the Minister for Defence
Liberal	Paul Fletcher MP	Parliamentary Secretary to the Minister for Communications
Liberal	Christian Porter MP	Parliamentary Secretary to the Prime Minister
Liberal	Alan Tudge MP	Parliamentary Secretary to the Prime Minister
National	Michael McCormack MP	Parliamentary Secretary to the Minister for Finance

== Whips ==
=== House of Representatives ===
==== First arrangement ====
Party	Whip	Title
Liberal	Philip Ruddock MP	Chief Government Whip in the House of Representatives
Liberal	Nola Marino MP	Government Whip in House of Representatives
LNP	Scott Buchholz MP	Government Whip in House of Representatives
National	Mark Coulton MP	Nationals Chief Whip in the House of Representatives
LNP	George Christensen MP	Nationals Deputy Whip in the House of Representatives

==== Second arrangement ====
The whips of the House of Representatives were rearranged following Tony Abbott's sacking of Phillip Ruddock on 13 February 2015.

Party	Whip	Title
LNP	Scott Buchholz MP	Chief Government Whip in the House of Representatives
Liberal	Nola Marino MP	Government Whip in House of Representatives
Liberal	Andrew Nikolic MP	Government Whip in House of Representatives
National	Mark Coulton MP	Nationals Chief Whip in the House of Representatives
LNP	George Christensen MP	Nationals Deputy Whip in the House of Representatives

=== Senate ===
Party	Whip	Title
Liberal	Senator David Bushby	Chief Government Whip in the Senate
Liberal	Senator Anne Ruston	Deputy Government Whip in the Senate
Liberal	Senator Chris Back	Deputy Government Whip in the Senate
National	Senator Bridget McKenzie	Nationals Whip in the Senate

== See also ==
- Abbott government

== Notes ==
a Senator Arthur Sinodinos stepped down from his position as assistant treasurer on 19 March 2014 while his possible involvement in alleged corruption in New South Wales were being investigated by the Independent Commission Against Corruption. During this period, Sinodinos' duties were partially fulfilled by Minister for Finance, Mathias Cormann. Sinodinos officially resigned as assistant treasurer on 19 December 2014.
b Malcolm Turnbull resigned as minister for communications on 14 September 2015 with the intent of challenging Tony Abbott for the leadership of the Liberal Party. In the ballot held later that evening, Turnbull was elected to the leadership.
