= Electoral results for the Division of Gorton =

Australian division election results

This is a list of electoral results for the Division of Gorton in Australian federal elections from the division's creation in 2004 until the present.

== Members ==
Member	Party	Term
Brendan O'Connor	Labor	2004–present

== Election results ==
=== Elections in the 2020s ===
==== 2025 ====
2025 Australian federal election: Gorton
Party	Candidate	Votes	%	±%
Labor	Alice Jordan-Baird	48,834	43.05	+1.74
Liberal	John Fletcher	33,087	29.17	+1.75
Greens	Thuc Bao Huynh	12,244	10.79	+1.78
One Nation	Alan Reid	7,137	6.29	−0.98
Legalise Cannabis	Xavier Menta	6,535	5.76	+5.76
Family First	Kathrine Ashton	4,216	3.72	+3.72
Libertarian	Rob McCathie	1,377	1.21	+1.21
Total formal votes		113,430	95.61	+2.73
Informal votes		5,210	4.39	−2.73
Turnout		118,640	91.81	+11.46
Two-party-preferred result
Labor	Alice Jordan-Baird	68,380	60.28	+0.30
Liberal	John Fletcher	45,050	39.72	−0.30
Labor hold		Swing	+0.30	

==== 2022 ====
2022 Australian federal election: Gorton
Party	Candidate	Votes	%	±%
Labor	Brendan O'Connor	38,178	41.30	−10.13
Liberal	John Fletcher	25,350	27.42	−0.56
Greens	Praise Morris	8,325	9.01	+1.58
United Australia	Michael Virag	7,082	7.66	+0.36
One Nation	Daniel Connor	6,719	7.27	+7.27
Independent	Steven Loncar	2,341	2.53	+2.53
Victorian Socialists	Belle Gibson	2,064	2.23	+2.23
Great Australian	Tony Dobran	1,312	1.42	+0.64
Federation	Paul Lassig	1,063	1.15	+1.15
Total formal votes		92,434	92.88	−1.04
Informal votes		7,089	7.12	+1.04
Turnout		99,523	89.77	−1.24
Two-party-preferred result
Labor	Brendan O'Connor	55,434	59.97	−4.27
Liberal	John Fletcher	37,000	40.03	+4.27
Labor hold		Swing	−4.27	

Alluvial diagram for preference flows in the seat of Gorton in the 2022 federal election. indicates at what stage the winning candidate had over 50% of the votes and was declared the winner.

=== Elections in the 2010s ===
==== 2019 ====
2019 Australian federal election: Gorton
Party	Candidate	Votes	%	±%
Labor	Brendan O'Connor	47,398	50.08	−11.16
Liberal	Nathan Di Noia	24,677	26.07	−2.69
Independent	Jarrod Bingham	8,363	8.84	+8.84
United Australia	Richard Turton	7,473	7.90	+7.90
Greens	Harkirat Singh	6,730	7.11	−2.89
Total formal votes		94,641	94.08	−0.87
Informal votes		5,957	5.92	+0.87
Turnout		100,598	91.11	+4.10
Two-party-preferred result
Labor	Brendan O'Connor	61,861	65.36	−3.13
Liberal	Nathan Di Noia	32,780	34.64	+3.13
Labor hold		Swing	−3.13	

==== 2016 ====
2016 Australian federal election: Gorton
Party	Candidate	Votes	%	±%
Labor	Brendan O'Connor	61,110	62.29	+11.56
Liberal	Daryl Lang	27,305	27.83	+2.35
Greens	Rod Swift	9,690	9.88	+3.49
Total formal votes		98,105	94.92	+2.03
Informal votes		5,253	5.08	−2.03
Turnout		103,358	89.12	−3.09
Two-party-preferred result
Labor	Brendan O'Connor	68,135	69.45	+3.33
Liberal	Daryl Lang	29,970	30.55	−3.33
Labor hold		Swing	+3.33	

==== 2013 ====
2013 Australian federal election: Gorton
Party	Candidate	Votes	%	±%
Labor	Brendan O'Connor	44,449	50.73	−12.12
Liberal	Phil Humphreys	22,328	25.48	+3.40
Greens	Dinesh Jayasuriya	5,597	6.39	−2.58
Palmer United	Anthony Barnes	5,238	5.98	+5.98
Sex Party	Rhiannon Hunter	2,850	3.25	+3.25
Family First	Scott Amberley	2,538	2.90	−2.11
Democratic Labour	Michael Deverala	2,392	2.73	+2.73
Christians	Mabor Chadhuol	1,132	1.29	+1.29
Katter's Australian	Graham Macardy	1,090	1.24	+1.24
Total formal votes		87,614	92.89	−0.18
Informal votes		6,706	7.11	+0.18
Turnout		94,320	92.23	+0.30
Two-party-preferred result
Labor	Brendan O'Connor	57,933	66.12	−7.51
Liberal	Phil Humphreys	29,681	33.88	+7.51
Labor hold		Swing	−7.51	

==== 2010 ====
2010 Australian federal election: Gorton
Party	Candidate	Votes	%	±%
Labor	Brendan O'Connor	58,767	59.98	−1.95
Liberal	Damon Ryder	23,116	23.59	−0.73
Greens	Steve Wilson	9,949	10.15	+4.06
Family First	Sean Major	6,153	6.28	+2.33
Total formal votes		97,985	93.29	−2.27
Informal votes		7,048	6.71	+2.27
Turnout		105,033	92.41	−2.51
Two-party-preferred result
Labor	Brendan O'Connor	70,705	72.16	+0.94
Liberal	Damon Ryder	27,280	27.84	−0.94
Labor hold		Swing	+0.94	

=== Elections in the 2000s ===
==== 2007 ====
2007 Australian federal election: Gorton
Party	Candidate	Votes	%	±%
Labor	Brendan O'Connor	58,732	61.93	+2.56
Liberal	Susan Jennison	23,063	24.32	−8.10
Greens	Huong Truong	5,775	6.09	+0.99
Family First	Scott Amberley	3,746	3.95	+1.46
Democratic Labor	Vern Hughes	3,516	3.71	+3.71
Total formal votes		94,832	95.56	+0.62
Informal votes		4,405	4.44	−0.62
Turnout		99,237	95.00	+0.96
Two-party-preferred result
Labor	Brendan O'Connor	67,535	71.22	+6.32
Liberal	Susan Jennison	27,297	28.78	−6.32
Labor hold		Swing	+6.32	

==== 2004 ====
2004 Australian federal election: Gorton
Party	Candidate	Votes	%	±%
Labor	Brendan O'Connor	48,930	59.37	+0.07
Liberal	Susan Jennison	26,717	32.42	+8.39
Greens	Steven Wilson	4,204	5.10	+2.04
Family First	Ian Mallon	2,052	2.49	+2.49
Citizens Electoral Council	Colin Ross Morgan Campbell	510	0.62	−0.26
Total formal votes		82,413	94.94	+0.90
Informal votes		4,396	5.06	−0.90
Turnout		86,809	94.04	−0.11
Two-party-preferred result
Labor	Brendan O'Connor	53,486	64.90	−5.07
Liberal	Susan Jennison	28,927	35.10	+5.07
Labor notional hold		Swing	−5.07	
