= Minister for Education (Australia) =

Australian cabinet position

- Commonwealth Coat of Arms

- Flag of Australia

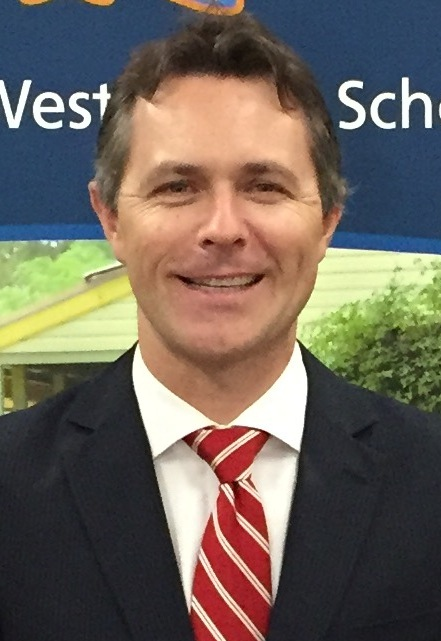
- Incumbent; Jason Clare since 1 June 2022
- Department of Education (Australia)
- Style: The Honourable
- Appointer: Governor-General on the recommendation of the Prime Minister of Australia
- Inaugural holder: John Gorton (as Minister for Education and Science)
- Formation: 14 December 1966
- Website: ministers.education.gov.au/clare

In the Government of Australia, the Minister for Education administers the Department of Education. The position is held by Labor MP Jason Clare, following the Australian federal election in 2022.

== Portfolio scope ==
The Minister is responsible for a number of areas, including:

- Education policy and programs including schools, vocational, higher education and Indigenous education, but excluding migrant adult education
- Education and training transitions policy and programs
- Science awareness programs in schools
- Training, including apprenticeships and training services
- Policy, co-ordination and support for education exports and services
- Income support policies and programs for students and apprentices

== List of ministers for education ==
The persons who have been Ministers for Education are as follows:

| Order | Minister | Party | Prime Minister | Title | Term start | Term end | Term in office |
|---|---|---|---|---|---|---|---|
| 1 | John Gorton | Liberal | Menzies | Minister in charge of Commonwealth Activities in Education and Research under the Prime Minister | 18 December 1963 | 26 January 1966 | 4 years, 23 days |
| 1 | John Gorton | Liberal | Holt | Minister in charge of Commonwealth Activities in Education and Research under the Prime Minister | 26 January 1966 | 14 December 1966 | 4 years, 23 days |
| 1 | John Gorton | Liberal | Holt | Minister for Education and Science | 14 December 1966 | 19 December 1967 | 4 years, 23 days |
| 1 | John Gorton | Liberal | McEwen | Minister for Education and Science | 19 December 1967 | 10 January 1968 | 4 years, 23 days |
| 1 | John Gorton | Liberal | Gorton | Minister for Education and Science | 10 January 1968 | 28 February 1968 | 4 years, 23 days |
| 2 | Malcolm Fraser | Liberal | Gorton | Minister for Education and Science | 28 February 1968 | 12 November 1969 | 1 year, 257 days |
| 3 | Nigel Bowen | Liberal | Gorton | Minister for Education and Science | 12 November 1969 | 10 March 1971 | 3 years, 22 days |
| 3 | Nigel Bowen | Liberal | McMahon | Minister for Education and Science | 10 March 1971 | 22 March 1971 | 3 years, 22 days |
| 4 | David Fairbairn | Liberal | McMahon | Minister for Education and Science | 22 March 1971 | 20 August 1971 | 151 days |
| acting | Malcolm Fraser | Liberal | McMahon | Minister for Education and Science | 20 August 1971 | 5 December 1972 | 1 year, 107 days |
| 5 | Gough Whitlam^{1} | Labor | Whitlam | Minister for Education and Science | 5 December 1972 | 19 December 1972 | 14 days |
| 6 | Kim Beazley, Snr. | Labor | Whitlam | Minister for Education | 19 December 1972 | 11 November 1975 | 2 years, 327 days |
| 7 | Margaret Guilfoyle | Liberal | Fraser | Minister for Education | 11 November 1975 | 22 December 1975 | 41 days |
| 8 | John Carrick | Liberal | Fraser | Minister for Education | 22 December 1975 | 8 December 1979 | 3 years, 351 days |
| 9 | Wal Fife | Liberal | Fraser | Minister for Education | 8 December 1979 | 7 May 1982 | 2 years, 150 days |
| 10 | Peter Baume | Liberal | Fraser | Minister for Education | 7 May 1982 | 11 March 1983 | 308 days |
| 11 | Susan Ryan | Labor | Hawke | Minister for Education and Youth Affairs | 11 March 1983 | 13 December 1984 | 4 years, 135 days |
| 11 | Susan Ryan | Labor | Hawke | Minister for Education | 13 December 1984 | 24 July 1987 | 4 years, 135 days |
| 12 | John Dawkins | Labor | Hawke | Minister for Employment, Education and Training | 24 July 1987 | 20 December 1991 | 4 years, 156 days |
| 12 | John Dawkins | Labor | Keating | Minister for Employment, Education and Training | 20 December 1991 | 27 December 1991 | 4 years, 156 days |
| 13 | Kim Beazley | Labor | Keating | Minister for Employment, Education and Training | 27 December 1991 | 23 December 1993 | 1 year, 361 days |
| 14 | Simon Crean | Labor | Keating | Minister for Employment, Education and Training | 23 December 1993 | 11 March 1996 | 4 years, 75 days |
| 15 | Amanda Vanstone | Liberal | Howard | Minister for Employment, Education, Training and Youth Affairs | 11 March 1996 | 9 October 1997 | 1 year, 212 days |
| 16 | David Kemp | Liberal | Howard | Minister for Education, Training and Youth Affairs | 9 October 1997 | 26 November 2001 | 4 years, 48 days |
| 17 | Brendan Nelson | Liberal | Howard | Minister for Education, Science and Training | 26 November 2001 | 27 January 2006 | 4 years, 62 days |
| 18 | Julie Bishop | Liberal | Howard | Minister for Education, Science and Training | 27 January 2006 | 3 December 2007 | 1 year, 310 days |
| 19 | Julia Gillard | Labor | Rudd | Minister for Education | 3 December 2007 | 24 June 2010 | 2 years, 207 days |
| 19 | Julia Gillard | Labor | Gillard | Minister for Education | 24 June 2010 | 28 June 2010^{2} | 2 years, 207 days |
| n/a | Simon Crean | Labor | Gillard | Minister for Education | 28 June 2010 | 14 September 2010 | 78 days |
| 20 | Peter Garrett | Labor | Gillard | Minister for School Education, Early Childhood and Youth | 14 September 2010 | 1 July 2013 | 2 years, 290 days |
| 21 | Bill Shorten | Labor | Rudd | Minister for Education | 1 July 2013 | 18 September 2013 | 79 days |
| 22 | Christopher Pyne | Liberal | Abbott | Minister for Education | 18 September 2013 | 23 December 2014 | 2 years, 3 days |
| 22 | Christopher Pyne | Liberal | Abbott | Minister for Education and Training | 23 December 2014 | 15 September 2015 | 2 years, 3 days |
| 22 | Christopher Pyne | Liberal | Turnbull | Minister for Education and Training | 15 September 2015 | 21 September 2015 | 2 years, 3 days |
| 23 | Simon Birmingham | Liberal | Turnbull | Minister for Education and Training | 21 September 2015 | 24 August 2018 | 2 years, 341 days |
| 23 | Simon Birmingham | Liberal | Morrison | Minister for Education and Training | 24 August 2018 | 28 August 2018 | 2 years, 341 days |
| 24 | Dan Tehan | Liberal | Morrison | Minister for Education | 28 August 2018 | 22 December 2020 | 2 years, 116 days |
| 25 | Alan Tudge | Liberal | Morrison | Minister for Education and Youth | 22 December 2020 | 2 December 2021 (Note: On leave from 2 December 2021. Officially resigned on 4 March 2022.) | 345 days |
| (acting) | Stuart Robert | Liberal | Morrison | Minister for Education and Youth | 2 December 2021 | 23 May 2022 | 172 days |
| 26 | Jason Clare | Labor | Albanese | Minister for Education | 1 June 2022 | Incumbent | 4 years, 98 days |

Notes

^{1} Whitlam was part of a two-man ministry comprising himself and Lance Barnard for fourteen days until the full ministry was commissioned.
^{2} Despite the First Rudd Ministry ending on 24 June 2010, Gillard was Minister for Education for four days in her first ministry, between 24 June and 28 June 2010, when the revised ministry was commissioned.

== List of ministers for vocational education and skills ==
The following individuals have been appointed as Minister for Skills and Training, or any of its precedent titles:

| Order | Minister | Party | Prime Minister | Title | Term start | Term end | Term in office |
|---|---|---|---|---|---|---|---|
| 1 | Peter Baldwin | Labor | Hawke | Minister for Higher Education and Employment Services | 7 May 1990 | 20 December 1991 | 2 years, 321 days |
| 1 | Peter Baldwin | Labor | Keating | Minister for Higher Education and Employment Services | 20 December 1991 | 24 March 1993 | 2 years, 321 days |
| 2 | Ross Free | Labor | Keating | Minister for Schools, Vocational Education and Training | 24 March 1993 | 11 March 1996 | 3 years, 18 days |
| 3 | David Kemp | Liberal | Howard | Minister for Schools, Vocational Education and Training | 11 March 1996 | 6 October 1997 | 1 year, 209 days |
| 4 | Chris Ellison | Liberal | Howard | Minister for Schools, Vocational Education and Training | 6 October 1997 | 21 October 1998 | 1 year, 15 days |
| 5 | Gary Hardgrave | Liberal | Howard | Minister for Vocational and Technical Education | 22 October 2004 | 23 January 2007 | 2 years, 93 days |
| 6 | Andrew Robb | Liberal | Howard | Minister for Vocational and Further Education | 23 January 2007 | 3 December 2007 | 314 days |
| 7 | Chris Evans | Labor | Gillard | Minister for Tertiary Education, Skills, Jobs and Workplace Relations | 14 September 2010 | 14 December 2011 | 2 years, 172 days |
| 7 | Chris Evans | Labor | Gillard | Minister for Tertiary Education, Skills, Science and Research | 14 December 2011 | 2 February 2013 | 2 years, 172 days |
| 8 | Chris Bowen | Labor | Gillard | Minister for Tertiary Education, Skills, Science and Research | 2 February 2013 | 22 March 2013 | 48 days |
| 9 | Craig Emerson | Labor | Gillard | Minister for Tertiary Education, Skills, Science and Research | 25 March 2013 | 26 June 2013 | 93 days |
| 10 | Brendan O'Connor | Labor | Rudd | Minister for Skills and Training | 1 July 2013 | 18 September 2013 | 79 days |
| 11 | Simon Birmingham | Liberal | Abbott | Assistant Minister for Education and Training | 23 December 2014 | 15 September 2015 | 272 days |
| 11 | Simon Birmingham | Liberal | Turnbull | Assistant Minister for Education and Training | 15 September 2015 | 21 September 2015 | 272 days |
| 12 | Luke Hartsuyker | National | Turnbull | Minister for Vocational Education and Skills | 21 September 2015 | 18 February 2016 | 150 days |
| 13 | Scott Ryan | Liberal | Turnbull | Minister for Vocational Education and Skills | 18 February 2016 | 19 July 2016 | 152 days |
| 14 | Michaelia Cash | Liberal | Morrison | Minister for Small and Family Business, Skills and Vocational Education | 28 August 2018 | 29 May 2019 | 2 years, 214 days |
| 14 | Michaelia Cash | Liberal | Morrison | Minister for Employment, Skills, Small and Family Business | 29 May 2019 | 30 March 2021 | 2 years, 214 days |
| 15 | Stuart Robert | Liberal | Morrison | Minister for Employment, Workforce, Skills, Small and Family Business | 30 March 2021 | 23 May 2022 | 1 year, 54 days |
| (10) | Brendan O'Connor | Labor | Albanese | Minister for Skills and Training | 1 June 2022 | 29 July 2024 | 2 years, 58 days |
| 16 | Andrew Giles | Labor | Albanese | Minister for Skills and Training | 29 July 2024 | Incumbent | 2 years, 40 days |

== Former ministerial titles ==
=== List of junior ministers for education ===
The persons who have been junior Ministers in the Education portfolio are:

| Order | Minister | Party affiliation | Prime Minister | Ministerial title | Term start | Term end | Term in office |
|---|---|---|---|---|---|---|---|
| 1 | Peter Baldwin | Labor | Hawke | Minister for Higher Education and Employment Services | 7 May 1990 | 20 December 1991 | 2 years, 321 days |
| 1 | Peter Baldwin | Labor | Keating | Minister for Higher Education and Employment Services | 20 December 1991 | 24 March 1993 | 2 years, 321 days |
| 2 | Sharon Bird | Labor | Gillard | Minister for Higher Education and Skills | 25 March 2013 | 1 July 2013 | 98 days |
| 3 | Kim Carr | Labor | Rudd | Minister for Higher Education | 1 July 2013 | 18 September 2013 | 79 days |
| 4 | Sussan Ley | Liberal | Abbott | Assistant Minister for Education | 18 September 2013 | 23 December 2014 | 1 year, 96 days |
| 5 | Simon Birmingham | Liberal | Abbott | Assistant Minister for Education and Training | 23 December 2014 | 15 September 2015 | 272 days |
| 5 | Simon Birmingham | Liberal | Turnbull | Assistant Minister for Education and Training | 15 September 2015 | 21 September 2015 | 272 days |
| 6 | Richard Colbeck | Liberal | Turnbull | Minister for Tourism and International Education | 21 September 2015 | 19 July 2016 | 302 days |
| 7 | Andrew Gee | National | Morrison | Minister for Decentralisation and Regional Education | 6 February 2020 | 2 July 2021 | 1 year, 146 days |
| 8 | Bridget McKenzie | National | Morrison | Minister for Regionalisation, Regional Communications and Regional Education | 2 July 2021 | 23 May 2022 | 325 days |

== List of assistant ministers ==
The following individuals have been appointed as Assistant Minister for Education, or any of its precedent titles:

| Order | Minister | Party affiliation | Prime Minister | Ministerial title | Term start | Term end | Term in office |
|---|---|---|---|---|---|---|---|
| 1 | Anthony Chisholm | Labor | Albanese | Assistant Minister for Education | 1 June 2022 | 13 May 2025 | 2 years, 346 days |
| 2 | Julian Hill | Labor | Albanese | Assistant Minister for International Education | 13 May 2025 | Incumbent | 1 year, 117 days |

== See also ==
- Minister for Education and Early Learning (New South Wales)
- Minister for Education (Victoria)
- Minister for Education (Western Australia)
- Minister for Skills, TAFE and Tertiary Education
