= Kim Carr =

Australian politician (born 1955)

The Honourable Kim Carr
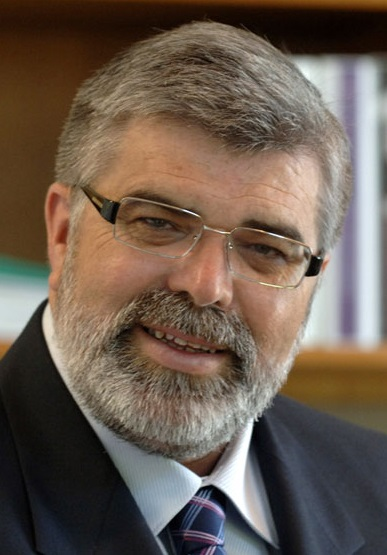

Minister for Innovation, Industry, Science and Research
- In office 1 July 2013 – 18 September 2013
- Prime Minister: Kevin Rudd
- Preceded by: Greg Combet
- Succeeded by: Ian Macfarlane
- In office 3 December 2007 – 12 December 2011
- Prime Minister: Kevin Rudd; Julia Gillard
- Preceded by: Ian Macfarlane
- Succeeded by: Greg Combet

Minister for Higher Education
- In office 1 July 2013 – 18 September 2013
- Prime Minister: Kevin Rudd
- Preceded by: Craig Emerson
- Succeeded by: Christopher Pyne

Minister for Human Services
- In office 2 March 2012 – 22 March 2013
- Prime Minister: Julia Gillard
- Preceded by: Brendan O'Connor
- Succeeded by: Jan McLucas

Minister for Defence Material
- In office 14 December 2011 – 2 March 2012
- Prime Minister: Julia Gillard
- Preceded by: Jason Clare
- Succeeded by: Jason Clare

Minister for Manufacturing
- In office 14 December 2011 – 2 March 2012
- Prime Minister: Julia Gillard
- Preceded by: New office
- Succeeded by: Office abolished

Senator for Victoria
- In office 28 April 1993 – 30 June 2022
- Preceded by: John Button
- Succeeded by: Linda White

Personal details
- Born: Kim John Carr; 2 July 1955 (age 71) Tumut, New South Wales, Australia
- Party: Australian Labor Party
- Education: University of Melbourne
- Occupation: Politician
- Profession: Teacher

Kim John Carr (born 2 July 1955) is an Australian former politician who served as a Senator for Victoria between 1993 and 2022. Representing the Labor Party, he was a minister in the Rudd and Gillard governments.

Carr is a graduate of the University of Melbourne, and before entering politics worked as a schoolteacher and political staffer. He was appointed to the Senate in 1993, filling a casual vacancy, and was made a member of the shadow ministry after Labor's defeat at the 1996 election. Carr held a variety of portfolios in the Labor governments between 2007 and 2013. He was considered a leader of the Labor Left faction in Victoria until 2016 when he formed the Industrial Left, a breakaway mini-faction comprising nearly all of Carr's union allies. He became the most senior senator and thus father of the senate in 2019, retaining the title until his retirement in 2022.

== Early life ==
Carr was born on 2 July 1955 in Tumut, New South Wales. His father was a boilermaker, working on the Snowy Mountains Scheme. The family moved regularly when he was a child, living at a caravan park in Gladstone, Queensland, for a period. He attended Moreland High School in Coburg, Victoria, where "a history teacher fuelled his interest in politics by slipping him copies of socialist literature to read at home".

Carr studied history at the University of Melbourne, completing a Bachelor of Arts with honours and a Master of Arts, and later a Diploma of Education. He joined the Labor Party in 1975. He was a secondary school teacher for nine years before becoming a political staffer for Victorian government ministers Joan Kirner and Andrew McCutcheon.

== Parliamentary career ==
Carr was elected to the Senate at the March 1993 election, and was due to take his seat on 1 July. When retiring Senator John Button resigned before the expiry of his term, however, Carr was appointed to the resulting casual vacancy on 28 April. Following his maiden speech, in which he described the opposition as pursuing "inhumane policies", he was accused by Liberal Senate leader Robert Hill of breaking a parliamentary convention around the content of maiden speeches. By 1994, he was regarded as the leader of the Victorian Left faction.

Carr became a Shadow Parliamentary Secretary in March 1996 in addition to being the Manager of Opposition Business in the Senate until his election to the Opposition Shadow Ministry in November 2001. He was Shadow Minister for Science and Research from then until October 2004. He was also Shadow Minister for Industry and Innovation from July 2003 to October 2004. He has been Shadow Minister for Public Administration and Open Government, Shadow Minister for Indigenous Affairs and Reconciliation and Shadow Minister for the Arts October 2004 to June 2005, when he was appointed Shadow Minister for Housing, Urban Development, Local Government and Territories. He is one of five voting Victorian members of the party's National Executive.

Carr was a leading figure in Labor's left faction in his prime. His influential position within the party has attracted substantial criticism from factional opponents, Carr was then described by colleagues as "ruthless", "calculating" and a "headkicker".

After the Labor's victory in the 2007 federal election, the new Prime Minister Kevin Rudd appointed Carr as Minister for Innovation, Industry, Science and Research, and he was sworn into office by Governor-General Michael Jeffery on 3 December.

Carr was re-elected in the 2010 election and retained his portfolio of Minister for Innovation, Industry, Science and Research in the Second Gillard Ministry, which was sworn in on 14 September 2010. He was dropped from the cabinet on 12 December 2011, amid speculation that it was due to his links with former prime minister Kevin Rudd. He remained in the outer Ministry however, as Minister for Manufacturing and Minister for Defence Materiel.

In the Ministerial reshuffle of 2 March 2012, Carr was appointed as Minister for Human Services. Carr resigned his ministerial portfolio on 22 March 2013 after he supported an unsuccessful attempt to reinstall Kevin Rudd as Labor Leader.

Following a subsequent successful leadership spill in which Gillard was defeated, Rudd appointed Carr as the Minister for Innovation, Industry, Science and Research, and Minister for Higher Education and member of Cabinet in the Second Rudd Ministry.

After Labor lost government in the 2013 federal election, Carr was allegedly "responsible for shifting a small but significant number of parliamentary numbers" to install Bill Shorten as party leader ahead of Anthony Albanese. He continued to be appointed to Shorten's shadow ministry. Carr became increasingly "estranged" from the Labor Left faction and in 2016, following the July federal election, the faction did not nominate Carr for the shadow ministry. In response, Carr formed his own mini-faction, the Industrial Left, which was recognised by Shorten's Labor Right, allowing him to remain in the shadow ministry.

Carr had been regarded as a longstanding political rival of Albanese. When Albanese became party leader in 2019, Carr announced he would not be nominating for Albanese's new shadow ministry.

As the 2022 federal election approached, Carr was facing a preselection challenge to remain on the party's Senate ticket for Victoria. It was reported in early March 2022 that he had lost the support of unions in the Industrial Left faction and was set to miss out on the Senate ticket. He had initially wanted to fight to remain in the Senate. However, following the recent death of fellow Senator Kimberley Kitching and "determined urgings" from his children, he announced on 27 March 2022 that he decided to retire at the election, citing health reasons.

== See also ==
- Book Industry Strategy Group
- First Rudd Ministry
- First Gillard Ministry
- Second Gillard Ministry
- Second Rudd Ministry

Parliament of Australia
| Preceded by John Button | Senator for Victoria; 1993–2022 | Succeeded by Linda White |
| Preceded by Ian Macdonald | Father of the Senate; 2019–2022 | Succeeded by Marise Payne |
Political offices
| Preceded by Ian Macfarlane | Minister for Innovation, Industry, Science and Research; 2007–2011 | Succeeded by Chris Evans |
| Preceded by Jason Clare | Minister for Defence Materiel; 2011–2012 | Succeeded by Jason Clare |
| Preceded by Brendan O'Connor | Minister for Human Services; 2012–2013 | Succeeded by Jason Clare |
| Preceded by Chris Evans | Minister for Innovation, Industry, Science and Research; 2013 | Succeeded by Ian Macfarlane |
| Preceded by Craig Emerson | Minister for Higher Education; 2013 | Succeeded by Office Abolished |
