= Jason Clare =

Australian politician (born 1972)

The Honourable Jason Clare MP
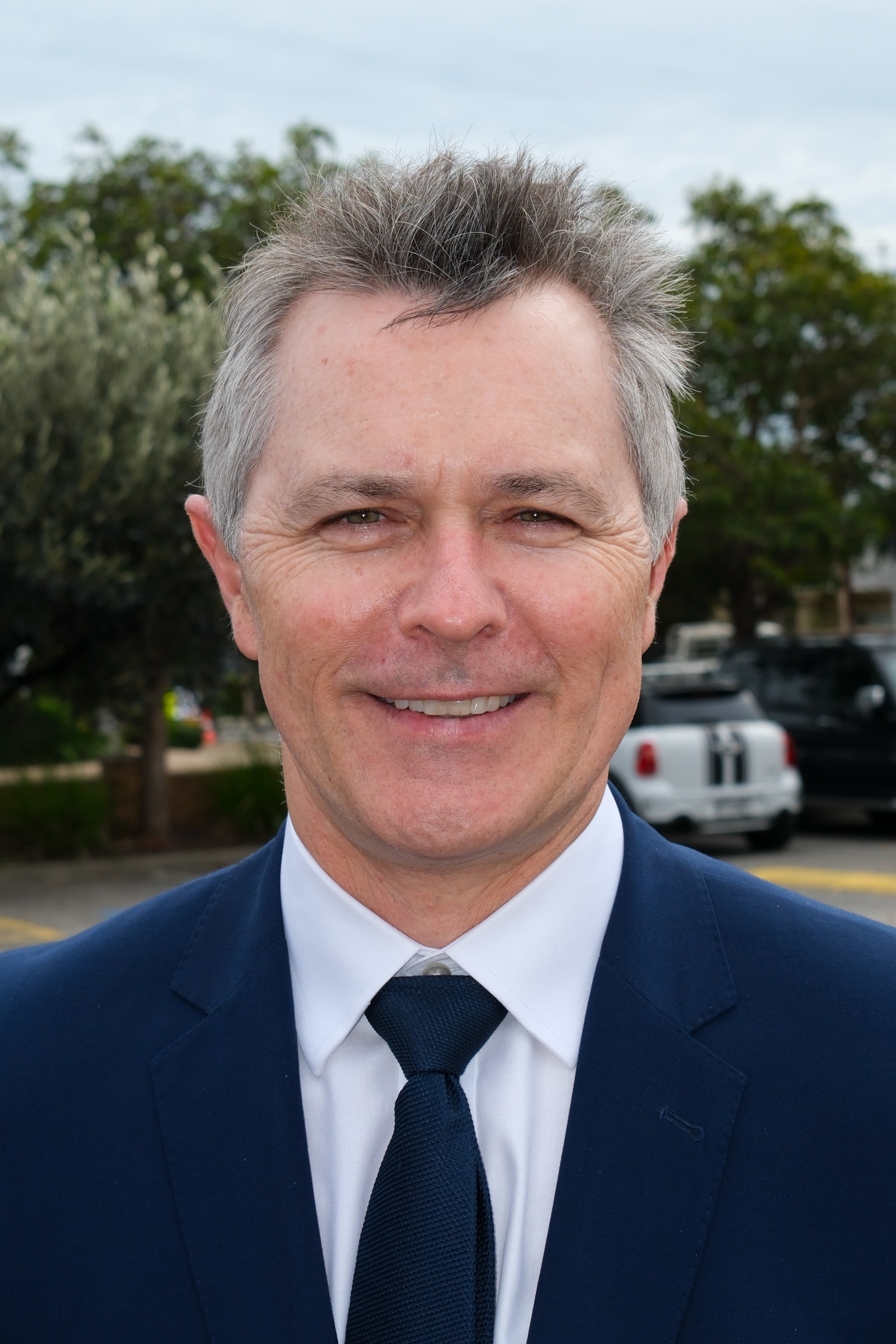
- Clare in 2026

Minister for Education
- Incumbent
- Assumed office 1 June 2022
- Prime Minister: Anthony Albanese
- Preceded by: Alan Tudge

Minister for Home Affairs
- In office 14 December 2011 – 18 September 2013
- Prime Minister: Julia Gillard; Kevin Rudd
- Preceded by: Brendan O'Connor
- Succeeded by: Michael Keenan

Minister for Justice
- In office 14 December 2011 – 18 September 2013
- Prime Minister: Julia Gillard; Kevin Rudd
- Preceded by: Brendan O'Connor
- Succeeded by: Peter Dutton

Minister for Defence Materiel
- In office 1 March 2012 – 4 February 2013
- Prime Minister: Julia Gillard
- Preceded by: Kim Carr
- Succeeded by: Mike Kelly
- In office 14 September 2010 – 14 December 2011
- Prime Minister: Julia Gillard
- Preceded by: Greg Combet
- Succeeded by: Kim Carr

Member of the Australian Parliament for Blaxland
- Incumbent
- Assumed office 24 November 2007
- Preceded by: Michael Hatton

Personal details
- Born: Jason Dean Clare; 22 March 1972 (age 54) Sydney, Australia
- Party: Labor Party
- Spouse: Louise Tran (m. 2012)
- Children: 2
- Education: Canley Vale High School
- Alma mater: University of New South Wales - BA(Hons), LLB
- Website: www.jasonclare.com.au

Jason Dean Clare (born 22 March 1972) is an Australian politician serving as Minister for Education since 1 June 2022. He is a member of the Australian Labor Party (ALP) and has represented the Division of Blaxland in Western Sydney since 2007.

Clare has been a member of the shadow cabinet from 2013 to 2022, under opposition leaders Bill Shorten and Anthony Albanese. He was a government minister under Julia Gillard and Kevin Rudd from 2010 to 2013, serving as Minister for Defence Materiel (2010–2011, 2012–2013), Home Affairs (2011–2013), Justice (2011–2013), and Cabinet Secretary (2013).

He returned to the ministry as Minister for Education after the ALP's victory in the 2022 Australian federal election.

== Early life and education ==
Clare was born on 22 March 1972 and raised in Western Sydney. He attended Cabramatta Public School and then Canley Vale High School, where he was dux in 1989. When he left school he joined the Labor Party and was the secretary of the Cabramatta Branch for 10 years (1992 to 2002). He completed a Bachelor of Arts (Hons) and a Bachelor of Laws from the University of New South Wales. He was a senior adviser to former NSW Premier Bob Carr and an executive at Transurban, one of Australia's Top 100 companies.

== Political career ==
=== Preselection ===
Clare ran for Labor preselection in the division of Blaxland in 2007, challenging the incumbent 11-year Labor MP Michael Hatton. Clare won preselection in May 2007, defeating Hatton. He also competed for preselection against George Williams, who had been "anointed by the ALP executive", had the "blessing of former Prime Minister Gough Whitlam" and whose chances had been "talked up" by ABC news reports. Clare retained Blaxland at the 2007 federal election, which saw Labor win government.

Clare has been touted as a future ALP leader, but he has denied any interest in becoming leader, only wishing to reach the role of Minister for Education. He reached this aim on 1 June 2022.

=== Rudd–Gillard Governments (2007–2013) ===
Clare was appointed Parliamentary Secretary for Employment in June 2009. Following the intra-party power struggle that saw Julia Gillard become Prime Minister, Clare was promoted into the Ministry and appointed Minister for Defence Materiel in September 2010. He retained Blaxland with a clear majority at the 2010 election.

On 12 December 2011, Clare was appointed Minister for Home Affairs and Minister for Justice and in the March 2012 reshuffle he again picked up the portfolio of Defence Materiel.

On 4 February 2013, Clare replaced Mark Dreyfus as Cabinet Secretary, at the same time relinquishing the defence material portfolio. He retained the home affairs and justice portfolios through to the government's defeat at the 2013 federal election. However, on 1 July, following a leadership spill that saw Kevin Rudd return as prime minister, he was replaced as Cabinet Secretary by Alan Griffin. Clare was a member of Cabinet from 25 March to 1 July 2013.

=== Opposition (2013–2022) ===
Clare was a senior member of the shadow cabinet after Labor's defeat in 2013, under opposition leaders Bill Shorten and Anthony Albanese. He served as Shadow Minister for Communications (2013–2016), Resources and Northern Australia (2016–2019), Trade and Investment (2016–2019), Regional Services, Territories and Local Government (2019–2022), and Housing and Homelessness (2019–2022).

=== Albanese Government (2022–present) ===
Clare became Minister for Education on 1 June 2022 in the new Albanese Cabinet. In January 2023, Clare commented on the ongoing case regarding Kanye West's visa application. Clare stated that he believed that West, who is commonly referred to as Ye, should have his visa denied for his praise of Adolf Hitler and his history of anti-semitic comments.

== Political views ==
Following the 2013 election, Clare blamed the leadership tensions between Gillard and Rudd for the party's defeat, and stated it was time for "generational change" in the party's leadership.

Clare is a member of the Labor Right faction, and after Labor's defeat at the 2019 election initially supported Chris Bowen to replace Shorten as leader. However, Bowen later withdrew from the race, allowing Albanese (a member of the Left faction) to win election unopposed.

Clare supports same-sex marriage, despite his electorate recording 73.9% "No" responses, the highest in the Australian Marriage Law Postal Survey of 2017. In December 2023, Saint Ursula's College, Kingsgrove ended its ban on same-sex partners for LGBT+ students attending the school formal after Clare urged the Catholic school to “show a little bit of common sense”, saying “You should be able to take whoever you want to the Year 12 farewell.” A Change.org student petition against St Ursula's “discriminatory policy” had reached 4,900 signatures.

== See also ==
- First Rudd Ministry
- First Gillard Ministry
- Second Gillard Ministry
- Second Rudd Ministry
- Albanese ministry

Parliament of Australia
Preceded by Michael Hatton	Member for Blaxland; 2007–present	Incumbent
Political offices
Preceded by Greg Combet as Minister for Defence Materiel and Science	Minister for Defence Materiel; 2010–2011	Succeeded by Kim Carr
Preceded by Brendan O'Connor	Minister for Home Affairs; 2011–2013	Succeeded by Peter Dutton
Preceded by Brendan O'Connor	Minister for Justice; 2011–2013	Succeeded by Michael Keenan
Preceded by Kim Carr	Minister for Defence Materiel; 2012–2013	Succeeded by Mike Kelly
Preceded by Alan Tudge	Minister for Education; 2022–present	Incumbent
