= Kate Lundy =

Australian politician

The Honourable Kate Lundy
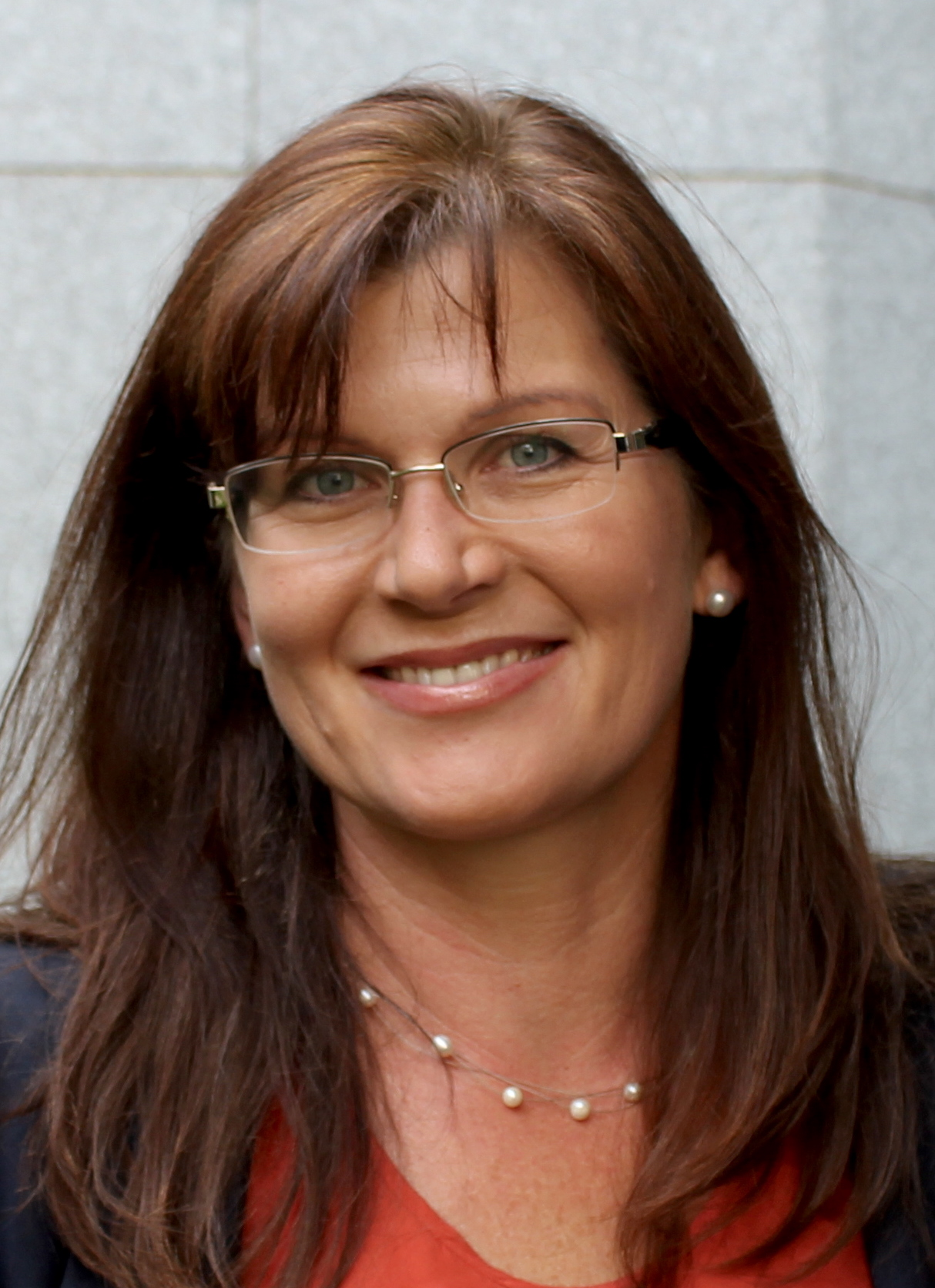
- Lundy in 2013

Minister for Multicultural Affairs
- In office 5 March 2012 – 18 September 2013
- Prime Minister: Julia Gillard; Kevin Rudd
- Preceded by: Office Created
- Succeeded by: Michaelia Cash

Minister for Sport
- In office 5 March 2012 – 1 July 2013
- Prime Minister: Julia Gillard
- Preceded by: Mark Arbib
- Succeeded by: Don Farrell

Senator for the Australian Capital Territory
- In office 2 March 1996 – 24 March 2015
- Preceded by: Bob McMullan
- Succeeded by: Katy Gallagher

Personal details
- Born: 15 December 1967 (age 58) Sydney, New South Wales, Australia
- Party: Australian Labor Party
- Website: www.katelundy.com.au

Kate Alexandra Lundy (born 15 December 1967) is an Australian former politician. She was a Labor Party member of the Australian Senate, representing the Australian Capital Territory. Lundy served as the Minister for Multicultural Affairs and the Minister Assisting for the Digital Economy in the Second Rudd Ministry; having previously served as the Minister for Sport and the Minister Assisting the Minister for Industry and Innovation.

== Background and early career ==
Born in Sydney, Lundy left school without completing Year 11 and did not tell her parents. She went to work on a construction site. She became the trade union representative and began her career in the Building Workers' Industrial Union.

== Political career ==
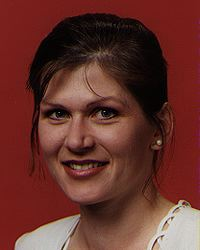
Lundy shortly after her election to Parliament.

In 1996, aged 28, Lundy became the youngest woman from the Australian Labor Party to be elected to the federal parliament; since superseded by Kate Ellis. She replaced Bob McMullan in the Senate when he moved to a lower house seat in that year's election.

After the 1998 Australian federal election, Lundy was made Shadow Minister for Sport and Youth Affairs and Shadow Minister Assisting the Shadow Minister for Industry and Technology on Information Technology. In 2001, she became Shadow Minister for Information Technology and Sport. She added the Arts and Recreation to her responsibilities in 2003 after Mark Latham became federal Labor leader. She was Shadow Minister for Manufacturing and Consumer Affairs from October 2004 to June 2005, when she was appointed Shadow Minister for Sport and Recreation. With the election of Kevin Rudd as Leader of the Parliamentary Labor Party in December 2006, the responsibilities of Health Promotion and Local Government were added to Lundy's responsibilities for Sport and Recreation.

Following the 2007 federal election, Lundy was replaced by Kate Ellis, who was appointed as Minister for Sport and Minister for Youth.

On 11 September 2010, Lundy was appointed Parliamentary Secretary for Immigration and Citizenship as well as Parliamentary Secretary to the Prime Minister and Cabinet as part of the original Second Gillard Ministry. In a subsequent reshuffle in March 2012, Lundy was appointed as the Minister for Sport following the retirement of Senator Mark Arbib, and she was also made Minister for Multicultural Affairs, and Minister Assisting the Minister for Industry and Innovation. On 1 July 2013, as part of the Second Rudd Ministry, Lundy retained the portfolio of Multicultural Affairs and gained the portfolio of Minister Assisting for the Digital Economy. Don Farrell was appointed as Minister for Sport.

Lundy is a member of the Socialist Left faction of Labor. She has been highly active on the issue of internet regulation, arguing against both the Howard government's and her own party's policy in that area. Lundy is also patron of the Canberra Rowing Club and the Pearcey Foundation.

On 26 November 2014, Lundy announced that she would not stand for re-election at the 2016 federal election. She resigned from the Senate on 24 March 2015, and the next day former ACT Chief Minister Katy Gallagher was appointed as her replacement by the ACT Legislative Assembly.

== Awards ==
In 2010, Lundy won the International Top 10 People Changing the World of Internet and Politics at the 11th World eDemocracy Forum which was held in Paris, France.

== See also ==
- First Gillard Ministry
- Second Gillard Ministry
- Second Rudd Ministry

Parliament of Australia
Preceded by Bob McMullan	Senator for the Australian Capital Territory; 1996–2015; Served alongside: Margaret Reid, Gary Humphries	Succeeded by Katy Gallagher
Political offices
Preceded by Mark Arbib	Minister for Sport; 2012–2013	Succeeded by Don Farrell
New ministerial post	Minister for Multicultural Affairs; 2012–2013	Succeeded by Michaelia Cash as Assistant Minister for Immigration and Border Protection
