= Mark Arbib =

Australian politician

The Honourable Mark Arbib
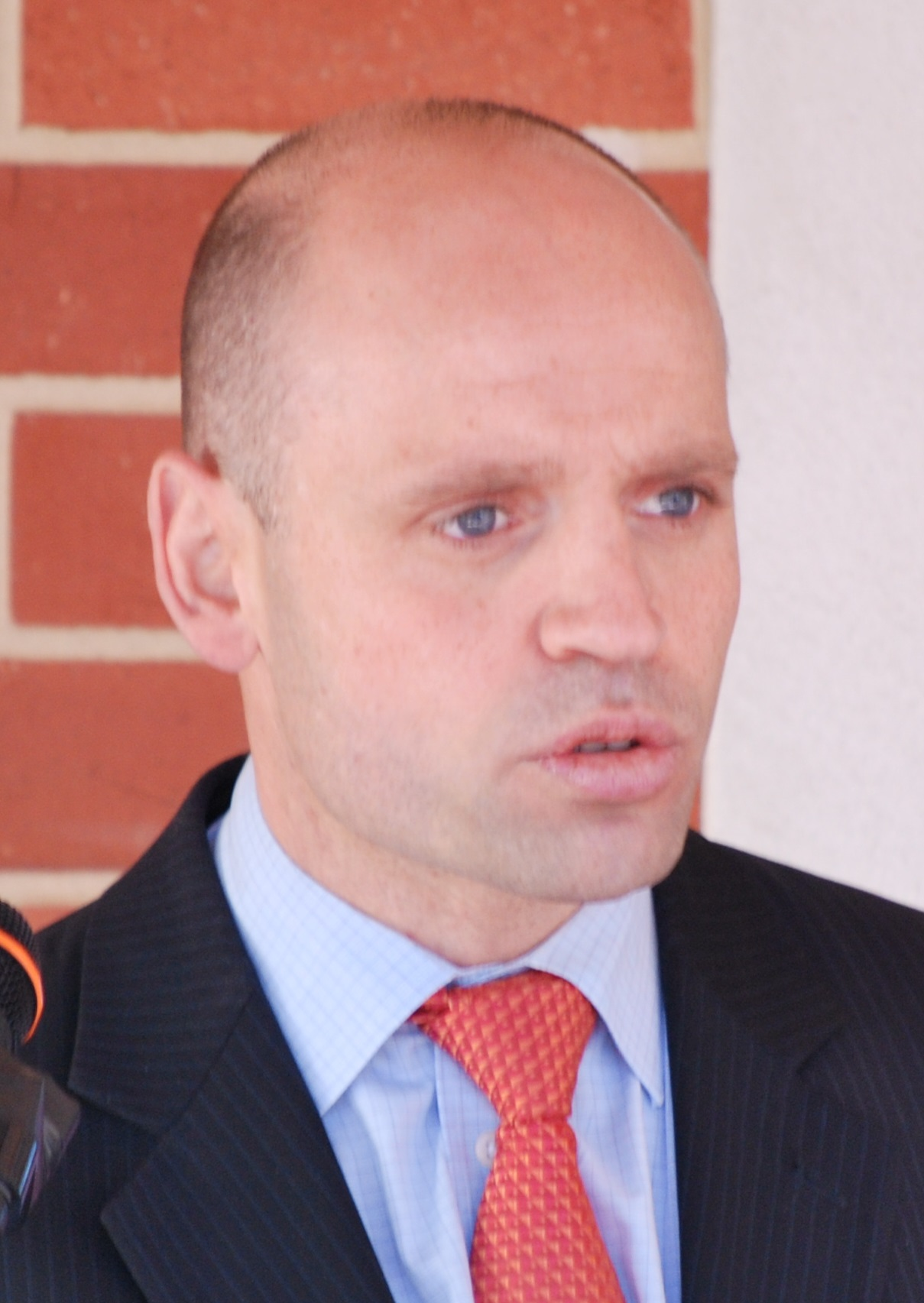

Minister for Sport
- In office 14 September 2010 – 2 March 2012
- Prime Minister: Julia Gillard
- Preceded by: Kate Ellis
- Succeeded by: Kate Lundy

Minister for Social Housing and Homelessness
- In office 14 September 2010 – 14 December 2011
- Prime Minister: Julia Gillard
- Preceded by: Tanya Plibersek
- Succeeded by: Robert McClelland

Minister for Employment Participation
- In office 9 June 2009 – 14 September 2010
- Prime Minister: Kevin Rudd; Julia Gillard
- Preceded by: Brendan O'Connor
- Succeeded by: Kate Ellis

Senator for New South Wales
- In office 1 July 2008 – 5 March 2012
- Preceded by: Kerry Nettle
- Succeeded by: Bob Carr

Personal details
- Born: Mark Victor Arbib; 9 November 1971 (age 55) Sydney, New South Wales, Australia
- Party: Labor Party
- Spouse: Kelli Field
- Children: 2 daughters
- Education: University of New South Wales
- Profession: Incoming CEO of the Australian Olympic Committee

Mark Victor Arbib (born 9 November 1971) is an Australian sports administrator and executive, a former Labor Party politician and trade unionist.

In 2015, he joined Athletics Australia where he served as President for six years. In 2016, Arbib was elected as an executive board member to the Australian Olympic Committee. In April 2025, Arbib was announced as the next CEO of the Australian Olympic Committee, commencing in May 2025.

Arbib was Minister for Sport from 2010 until 2012 and Minister for Social Housing and Homelessness from 2010 until 2011, during which time he also served as a Senator for New South Wales from 2008 to 2012.

== Political career ==
Arbib rose within the New South Wales Labor Party, and was elected as State Secretary in 2004, before being elected to the Senate at the 2007 election. Arbib was frequently described in the media as a "power-broker" within the Parliamentary Labor Party. In 2009, he was appointed to the Cabinet as Minister for Employment Participation.

In 2010, he was instrumental in the successful leadership challenge by Deputy Prime Minister Julia Gillard to Prime Minister Kevin Rudd. Gillard later named Arbib as Minister for Sport and Minister for Social Housing and Homelessness. After Rudd launched a leadership challenge against Gillard in 2012, Arbib announced his immediate retirement from politics.

Arbib was subsequently appointed a senior executive with James Packer's private investment company, Consolidated Press Holdings.

== Early career ==
While studying, Arbib worked part-time at a Sizzler restaurant in Bondi Junction. When there were moves to remove penalty rates, he negotiated on behalf of the part-time workers and signed up members to the Liquor Trades Union. Later he worked variously as a metal trades assistant, beach inspector and restaurant cook, but became increasingly involved in the trade union movement. In 1989 he had a bit part in the Australian soap opera Home and Away.

He joined the Australian Labor Party in 1992 and was elected as President of NSW Young Labor in 1995. He served as Assistant General Secretary from 1999 and was the ALP State Organiser between 1996 and 1999.

== Career as General Secretary ==
Arbib was elected General Secretary of the Australian Labor Party (NSW Branch) in June 2004. In 2005, he was elevated to the role of national convener of the party's right wing.

In 2007, Arbib was Campaign Director for Morris Iemma's successful 2007 state election campaign. Following the 2007 election victory for the Labor Party, he was credited by former premier Bob Carr as "one of the best campaigners in the business." However, the opposition has criticised his role in procuring political donations for the Labor party from business groups.

In January 2008, The Sydney Morning Herald quoted an organisation which makes political donations to the Labor Party as saying that Arbib made an art form out of extracting political donations from businesses. The donor said that: "There's no doubt Arbib wrote the book in terms of both political donations ... and their importance ... It's fine to take the higher ground and say 'we won't make donations' ... but if you don't you have got zero chance of getting (to see them)." Arbib denied the allegations. Arbib was named in the ABC television program Four Corners in relation to political donations to the NSW Labor Party.

Arbib was preselected for the number one position of Labor's New South Wales Senate ticket and won a seat at the 2007 federal election.

== Federal Politics ==
Arbib was a member of the ALP National Executive (from 2004) and a member of the ALP National Executive Committee (from 2007). In February 2009, he was appointed Parliamentary Secretary for Government Service Delivery.

In the June 2009 reshuffle, he was promoted to Employment Participation Minister and Minister Assisting the Prime Minister on Government Service Delivery.

On 24 June 2010, Arbib used his power as leader of the NSW right faction to shore up numbers to depose Kevin Rudd, then in his first term as prime minister, in favour of Julia Gillard. In August 2010 Arbib stood down from the ALP National Executive to concentrate on his portfolio duties. In November 2010 Arbib was the first Federal Labor Party front bencher to support same-sex marriage.

As Minister for Sport, Arbib championed a National Policy on Match Fixing in Sport which included nationally consistent criminal legislation. Arbib argued match-fixing was a threat to the integrity of sport and called for jail time for those found guilty of engaging in serious match-fixing and for the formation of an international WADA-type body to combat match-fixing internationally.

The United States diplomatic cables leaks revealed that Arbib was in regular contact with staff at the US embassy in Canberra and provided them with inside information and commentary on the workings of the government and the Labor Party. Arbib strongly denied having a special relationship with the United States and was highly critical of Fairfax's reporting of the cables which he claims contained a number of serious factual errors.

In the December 2011 reshuffle, Arbib was appointed as Assistant Treasurer, Minister for Small Business and Manager of Government Business in the Senate.

On 27 February 2012, hours after the ALP leadership ballot, Arbib announced his resignation from the Cabinet from 2 March, and his intention to also resign from the Senate. He cited wanting to spend more time with his family than being a Minister and Senator can allow. He also hoped his resigning would help the Labor Party to heal.

== Post Politics ==
In June 2012, Arbib became director of strategy and business development at Consolidated Press Holdings, the private investment company of James Packer.

Arbib also represented Consolidated Press Holdings on the board of the South Sydney Rabbitohs, and was a board member of the Packer Family Foundation which, in July 2014, announced a $200 million national philanthropic fund in partnership with the Crown Resorts Foundation.

== Sporting and philanthropic roles ==
In April 2012, Australian Rugby Union (ARU) announced that Arbib would conduct a major review into ARU's corporate governance. The review followed the decision of other major sports, including the Australian Rugby League Commission, Cricket Australia and Football Federation Australia, to review their governance structures.

In May 2012 it was also announced that Arbib would join the board of Sydney FC.

Arbib stepped down from Sydney FC in April 2016 to take up a new role as President of Athletics Australia after having been unanimously appointed to the position by his fellow directors. In his role as president, Arbib aimed to increase the reach and exposure of Athletics, including by making the sport more attractive to broadcasters. He stepped down from the position in 2021.

Arbib is also a board member of the professional Rugby League team the South Sydney Rabbitohs.

Arbib was an Ambassador for the Indigenous Marathon Project and for Australia's leading Indigenous non-profit education organisation, the Australian Indigenous Education Foundation.

In October 2016, he was elected to the Australian Olympic Committee Board.

In April 2025, Arbib was appointed to the position of chief executive of the Australian Olympic Committee. Arbib's term will commence in May.

== Personal life ==
Arbib was born in the Sydney suburb of Chippendale. His father, Eric Arbib, was of Libyan heritage and spoke Italian, moving to Australia in the 1960s and becoming a property developer. His mother, Lola, was born in Sydney. She raised Mark and his brother Scott after the death of their father when they were young. He has a Master of Arts in political science and economic history from the University of New South Wales.

He lives in Sydney with his wife Kelli Field and two daughters. He is a supporter of the Sydney Roosters NRL club, Sydney FC A-League club, and is a public Ambassador for Australia's leading Indigenous non-profit education organisation, the Australian Indigenous Education Foundation.

== See also ==
- First Rudd Ministry
- First Gillard Ministry
- Second Gillard Ministry

Political offices
Preceded by Brendan O'Connor	Minister for Employment Participation; 2009–2010	Succeeded by Kate Ellis
Preceded by Tanya Plibersek	Minister for Social Housing and Homelessness; 2010–2011	Succeeded by Robert McClelland
Preceded by Kate Ellis	Minister for Sport; 2010–2012	Succeeded by Kate Lundy
Party political offices
Preceded by Eric Roozendaal	General Secretary of the New South Wales Labor Party; 2004–2007	Succeeded by Karl Bitar
