= Immigration minister =

An immigration minister is a member of a government cabinet who usually heads and leads a ministry which manages issues of immigration, asylum for refugees, and the granting of citizenship.

== List of ministers by country ==
Country	Ministry	Minister
Afghanistan	Ministry of Refugees and Repatriations	Minister of Refugees and Repatriations
Australia	Department of Home Affairs	Minister for Immigration and Multicultural Affairs
Canada	Department of Immigration, Refugees and Citizenship	Minister of Immigration, Refugees and Citizenship
France	Ministry of Immigration, Integration, National Identity and Codevelopment	
Indonesia	Ministry of Law and Human Rights	Minister of Law and Human Rights
Iran	Ministry of Interior National Migration Organization	
India	Bureau of Immigration	
Israel	Ministry of Aliyah and Integration	Minister of Immigrant Absorption
Kiribati	Ministry of Foreign Affairs and Immigration	
Malaysia	Department of Immigration of Ministry of Home Affairs	Minister of Home Affairs
Myanmar	Ministry of Immigration and Population	
Netherlands	Ministry of Justice and Security	Minister of Asylum and Migration
New Zealand	Ministry of Business, Innovation and Employment	Minister of Immigration
Sweden	Ministry of Justice	Minister for Migration, formerly the Minister for Immigration
Thailand	Royal Thai Police, Immigration Bureau of Thailand	
United Kingdom	Home Office	Home Secretary

Other:

- Minister of Labour and Immigration (Manitoba)
- Ministry of Citizenship and Immigration (Ontario)
