= Alice Jordan-Baird =

Australian politician

Alice Jordan-Baird MP

Member of the Australian Parliament for Gorton
- Incumbent
- Assumed office 3 May 2025
- Preceded by: Brendan O'Connor

Personal details
- Born: 8 April 1993 (age 33) East Melbourne, Victoria, Australia
- Party: Labor
- Spouse: Chris
- Website: www.alp.org.au/our-people/our-people/alice-jordan-baird/

Alice Jordan-Baird (born 8 April 1993) is an Australian politician. She is a member of the Australian Parliament for the Division of Gorton representing the Labor Party after winning the seat in the 2025 Australian federal election. She was endorsed by the Transport Workers Union.

== Early life ==
Jordan-Baird's parents both worked on Melbourne's railways. Her mother was one of the first women that worked on Melbourne's underground railway loops.

Jordan-Baird is the youngest child in her family, with two older sisters. She has said that her family brought her up to have "strong Labor values".

Jordan-Baird attended University of Melbourne, where she completed a Bachelor of Science degree with a major in neuroscience. She joined the Labor party at university.

== Career ==
Jordan-Baird worked as a political adviser and in government relations prior to entering parliament, with a focus on climate change and water policy. She worked as a Communications Adviser from 2015 to 2019. She was a Ministerial Adviser for Education and Public Transport from June 2019 to July 2022. She worked as Government and Policy Manager for Melbourne Water from January 2023 to February 2025.

She was a Family Support Volunteer from 2013 to 2016.

== Political career ==
Jordan-Baird was announced as the Labor Party candidate for the electorate of Gorton in September 2024, following the retirement of Brendan O'Connor. She was endorsed by O'Connor and Deputy Prime Minister Richard Marles, defeating the Mayor of Brimbank City Council Ranka Rasic 12–9 in the preselection ballot.

Jordan-Baird achieved 43% of the first preference vote in Gorton at the 2025 federal election, winning the seat with 60.3% on a two party preferred basis. She is a member of the Labor Right faction.

== Personal life ==
Jordan-Baird lives in Sydenham. She married her husband Chris, an electrician, in 2024. They met at the Keilor Hotel.

Jordan-Baird is a member of the Transport Workers' Union.

Jordan-Baird's sister Clara died at 28 years of age in 2017. Losing her sister motivated her to run for Parliament, "I think losing her kind of crystallised what's important, what's worth fighting for," she said.

Parliament of Australia
Preceded by Brendan O'Connor	Member for Gorton; 2025–present	Incumbent
