= Chris Evans (Australian politician) =

Former Australian senator

The Honourable Chris Evans
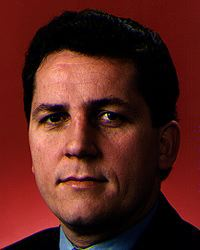

Australian Anti-Slavery Commissioner
- Incumbent
- Assumed office 2 December 2024
- Prime Minister: Anthony Albanese
- Preceded by: Office created

Leader of the Government in the Senate
- In office 3 December 2007 – 2 February 2013
- Prime Minister: Kevin Rudd; Julia Gillard
- Deputy: Stephen Conroy
- Preceded by: Nick Minchin
- Succeeded by: Stephen Conroy

Minister for Tertiary Education, Skills, Science and Research
- In office 14 December 2011 – 4 February 2013
- Prime Minister: Julia Gillard
- Preceded by: Kim Carr (as Minister for Innovation, Industry, Science and Research); Himself (as Minister for Tertiary Education, Skills, Jobs and Workplace Relations)
- Succeeded by: Chris Bowen

Minister for Tertiary Education, Skills, Jobs and Workplace Relations
- In office 14 September 2010 – 14 December 2011
- Prime Minister: Julia Gillard
- Preceded by: Simon Crean
- Succeeded by: Bill Shorten (as Minister for Employment and Workplace Relations); Himself (as Minister for Tertiary Education, Skills, Jobs and Workplace Relations)

Minister for Immigration and Citizenship
- In office 3 December 2007 – 14 September 2010
- Prime Minister: Kevin Rudd; Julia Gillard
- Preceded by: Kevin Andrews
- Succeeded by: Chris Bowen

Senator for Western Australia
- In office 1 July 1993 – 12 April 2013
- Preceded by: Patricia Giles
- Succeeded by: Sue Lines

Personal details
- Born: Christopher Vaughan Evans; 14 May 1958 (age 68) Cuckfield, UK
- Party: Australian Labor Party
- Website: https://www.antislaverycommissioner.gov.au/

Christopher Vaughan Evans (born 14 May 1958) is an Australian public servant and former politician. He was a member of the Australian Senate for the state of Western Australia from 1993 to 2013, representing the Australian Labor Party. He has served as the first Australian Anti-Slavery Commissioner since 2 December 2024.

== Early life ==
Evans was born in Cuckfield, England. He was educated at the University of Western Australia, where he graduated in Arts and was President of the University Labor Club. He was an industrial officer with the Federated Miscellaneous Workers' Union during 1982–87 and State Secretary of the Fire Brigade Union of Western Australia during 1987–90. He was Western Australian State Secretary of the Labor Party during 1991–93.

== Political career ==
Evans was elected to the Senate at the 1993 federal election and was re-elected in the 1998, 2004 and 2010 elections.

Evans was a member of the Opposition Shadow Ministry from October 1998 until December 2007 when Labor won the election. During the period from 1998 until 2007, he held various Shadow Ministries including Shadow Minister for Family Services and the Aged (October 1998 to December 2001); Defence (November 2001 to August 2004); Reconciliation, Aboriginal and Torres Strait Islander Affairs (December 2002 to February 2003); Defence Procurement, Science and Personnel (August 2004 to October 2004); Social Security (October 2004 to June 2005); Indigenous Affairs (June 2005 to December 2006); Family and Community Services (June 2005 to December 2006) and National Development, Resources and Energy (December 2006 to December 2007). Evans also became the Leader of the Opposition in the Senate in October 2004.

Evans became the Leader of the Government in the Senate after Labor's victory at the 2007 election. He was appointed Minister for Immigration and Citizenship in the First Rudd Ministry. In June 2008, when both Prime Minister Kevin Rudd and Deputy Prime Minister Julia Gillard were in Indonesia and New Zealand respectively, Evans was the Acting Prime Minister for around 30 hours. He was the first Labor senator to have been acting PM for nearly 100 years.

When Gillard became the new Labor leader and Prime Minister, Evans retained his immigration portfolios in the First Gillard Ministry. On 14 September 2010, following the 2010 election, Evans was sworn in as Minister for Tertiary Education, Skills, Jobs and Workplace Relations in the Second Gillard Ministry.

Following the January 2013 announcement that the 2013 federal election will be contested in September 2013, Evans, together with Nicola Roxon, resigned from the Ministry, from Cabinet, and as Leader of the Government in the Senate, effective on 2 February 2013. Evans stated his intention to stay on in the Senate until such time as a replacement was found. He resigned from the Senate on 12 April 2013.

In 2014, former Foreign Minister Bob Carr revealed in his book Diary of a Foreign Minister that he had whilst Foreign Minister vetoed a decision by Prime Minister Gillard to appoint a former Cabinet colleague as Australian Ambassador to Turkey. Carr did not name the former Cabinet colleague but ALP sources eventually confirmed it to be Evans. When contacted by the Sydney Sunday Telegraph, Evans confirmed that he had conversations with Gillard about the Turkey diplomatic post but "nothing that went anywhere". When asked about being posted to Turkey, Evans jokingly said, "I am more of a chicken man".

In November 2024, Evans was appointed as Australia's first anti-slavery commissioner and started this role in December.

== Personal life ==
Evans is married with two sons. He supports Fremantle Football Club in the AFL.

Political offices
Preceded by Kevin Andrews	Minister for Immigration and Citizenship; 2007–2010	Succeeded by Chris Bowen
Preceded by Simon Crean as Minister for Employment and Workplace Relations	Minister for Jobs and Workplace Relations; 2010–2011	Succeeded by Bill Shorten as Minister for Employment and Workplace Relations
Preceded by Simon Crean as Minister for Education	Minister for Tertiary Education and Skills; 2010–2013	Succeeded by Chris Bowen as Minister for Tertiary Education, Skills, Science and Research
Preceded by Kim Carr as Minister for Innovation, Industry, Science and Research	Minister for Science and Research; 2011-2013	Succeeded by Chris Bowen as Minister for Tertiary Education, Skills, Science and Research
Party political offices
Preceded by John Faulkner	Leader of the Australian Labor Party in the Senate; 2004–2013	Succeeded by Stephen Conroy
