= Andrew Giles =

Australian politician (born 1973)

The Honourable Andrew Giles MP
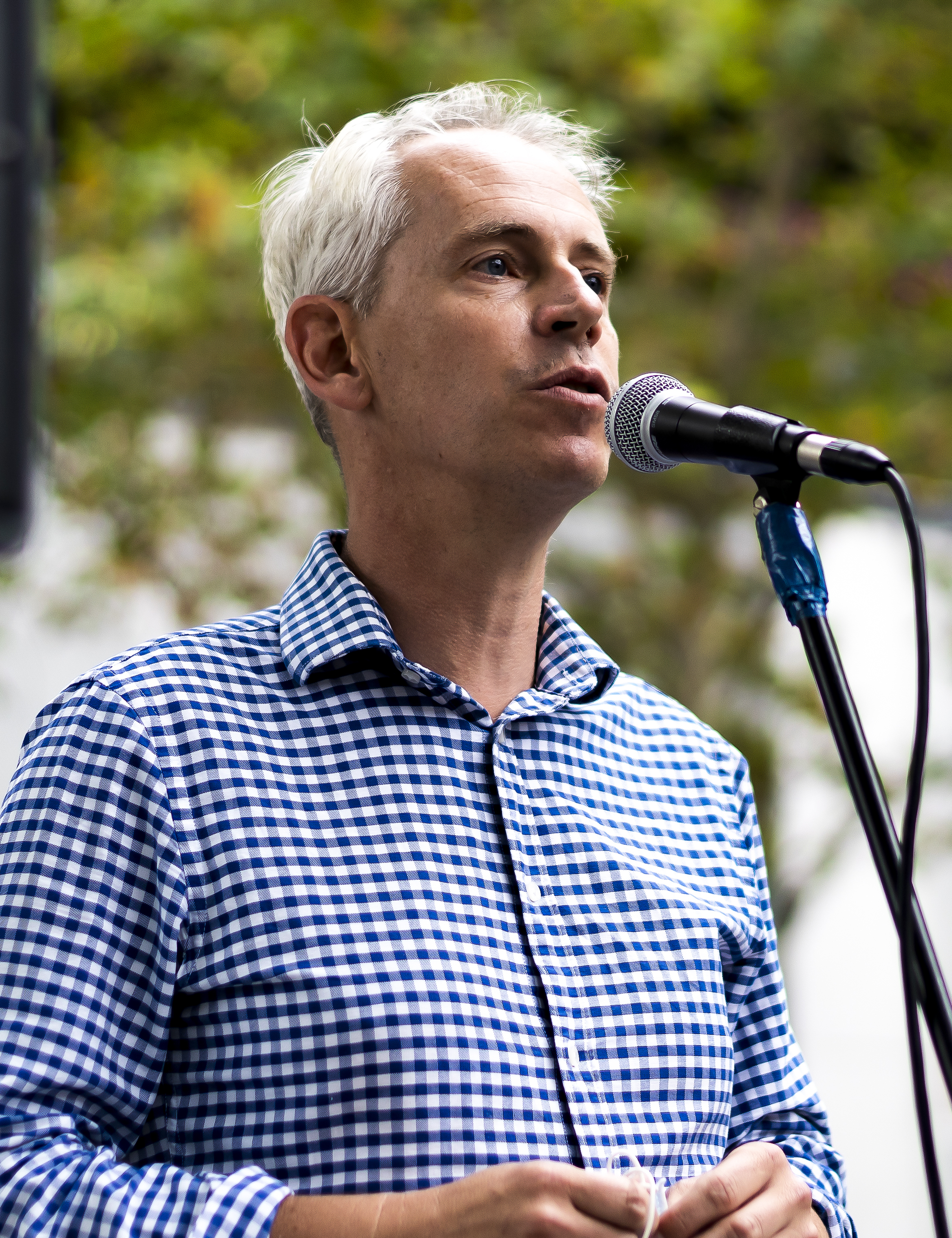

Minister for Skills and Training
- Incumbent
- Assumed office 29 July 2024
- Prime Minister: Anthony Albanese
- Preceded by: Brendan O'Connor

Minister for Immigration, Citizenship and Multicultural Affairs
- In office 1 June 2022 – 29 July 2024
- Prime Minister: Anthony Albanese
- Preceded by: Alex Hawke
- Succeeded by: Tony Burke

Member of the Australian Parliament for Scullin
- Incumbent
- Assumed office 7 September 2013
- Preceded by: Harry Jenkins

Personal details
- Born: 31 July 1973 (age 53) Melbourne, Victoria, Australia
- Party: Labor
- Spouse: Dr Jillian Constable
- Children: 2
- Education: University of Melbourne
- Profession: Lawyer and politician
- Website: www.andrewgiles.com.au

Andrew James Giles (born 31 July 1973) is an Australian politician. He has been a Labor member of the Australian House of Representatives since September 2013, representing the Division of Scullin, Victoria. He is currently the Minister for Skills and Training in the Albanese ministry. Giles joined the ALP when he was eighteen, and – prior to his election to Parliament – worked as a principal lawyer at Slater and Gordon in Melbourne, practising in employment law. Giles previously served as Shadow Assistant Minister for Schools between 2016 and 2019, and Shadow Minister for Multicultural Affairs and Shadow Minister for Cities and Urban Infrastructure from 2019 to 2022. Giles also previously served as one of the two federal parliamentary convenors of the Labor Left faction, along with Pat Conroy.

== Early life and education ==
Giles was born in Melbourne on 31 July 1973. His mother was born in the United Kingdom, making him a British citizen by descent; he renounced his dual citizenship before standing for parliament in 2013. Giles attended high school at Scotch College, Melbourne. Giles has a Bachelor of Arts and Laws from the University of Melbourne. Before entering parliament, he was a principal solicitor for Slater and Gordon and as a senior associate at Holding Redlich lawyers and consultants. He acted as a solicitor for refugees stranded aboard the MV Tampa. Giles also worked as a senior advisor for the Bracks and Brumby Governments in Victoria. He was secretary of the Socialist Left in Victoria.

== Parliamentary career ==
Giles was elected to parliament at the 2013 federal election, replacing the retiring Harry Jenkins in the Division of Scullin. He immediately took up a position as Labor's cities taskforce and has engaged in an Australia-wide cities listening tour. He is co-chair of Parliamentary friends of Amnesty International, and the deputy chair of the Parliament's Northern Europe group of its IPU members.

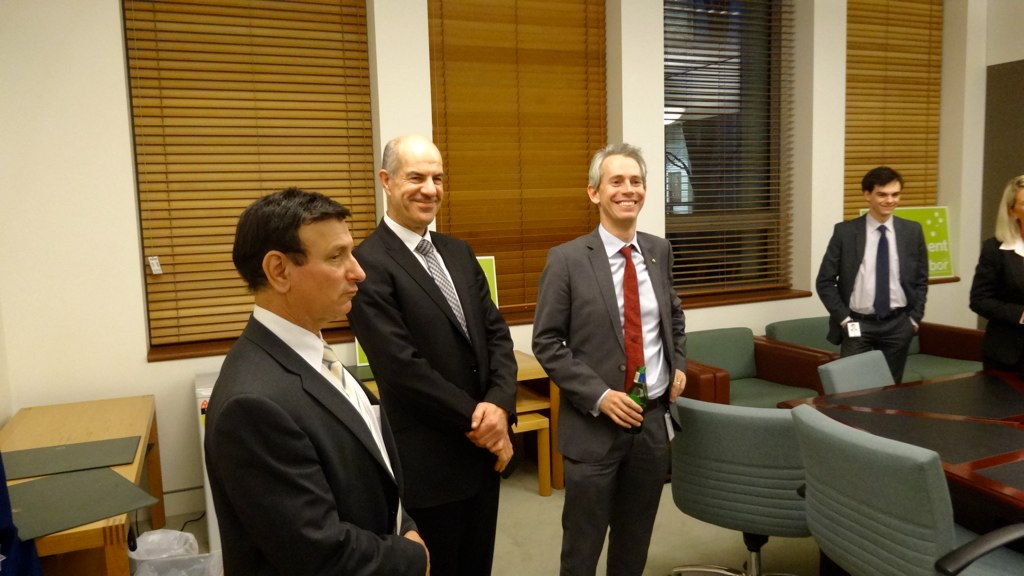
Giles (right) with Tony Zappia (left) and Kelvin Thomson (centre) in Parliament house in 2014

In 2016 he was elevated to the position of the Shadow Assistant Minister for Schools. In 2019 he became a member of Labor's Shadow Ministry. His portfolios included: Multicultural Affairs, Cities and Urban Infrastructure. He also served as the Shadow Minister Assisting for Immigration and Citizenship. In this role Giles led Labor's campaign to stop the Morrison Government's attempts to privatise Australia's visa system. He was also responsible for Labor's ‘reboot’ with multicultural communities, including the establishment of a Multicultural Caucus Committee to inform future policy development.

Following the 2022 federal election, Giles was appointed as Minister for Immigration, Citizenship and Multicultural Affairs in the Albanese ministry. As Immigration Minister, Giles issued "Ministerial Direction 99" in early 2023 to the Department of Home Affairs and Administrative Appeals Tribunal (AAT), which tightened the criteria for deporting non-citizen residents by focusing on their community ties and duration of time spent in Australia. This policy change had come in response to the New Zealand Government's objection to the large number of New Zealand criminals being deported from Australia despite their limited connection to New Zealand. While Direction 99 had listed family violence, forced marriage, violent or sexual crimes, human trafficking, people smuggling and work exploitation as grounds for deportation, ABC News reported that the AAT and Home Affairs had ignored that part of the ruling and instead focused on deportees' ties to Australia.

Following criticism from the opposition Liberal Party that Direction 99 had allowed non-citizens convicted of serious crimes to remain in Australia, Giles and Prime Minister Anthony Albanese announced in late May 2024 that the Australian Government would issue a new ministerial directive to expel serious criminal offenders. On 7 June 2024, Giles issued Ministerial Direction 110 which prioritised community safety as a criterion for deporting non-citizens. Under the new criteria, Giles also cancelled the visas of 40 non-citizens, citing national interest.

== Personal life ==
Giles has two children and lives with his wife, Dr Jillian Constable. Giles lives outside the electorate of Scullin, in Clifton Hill, according to his Parliamentary Register of Interests. In the 1990s, he played guitar in an indie rock band called Ether, along with James Cecil, who went on to play in bands such as Architecture in Helsinki.

Parliament of Australia
Preceded by Harry Jenkins	Member for Scullin; 2013–present	Incumbent
Political offices
Preceded by Alex Hawke	Minister for Immigration, Citizenship and Multicultural Affairs; 2022–2024	Succeeded by Tony Burke
Preceded by Brendan O'Connor	Minister for Skills and Training; 2024–present	Incumbent
