= Minister for Employment and Workplace Relations =

Australian cabinet position

- Commonwealth Coat of Arms

- Flag of Australia

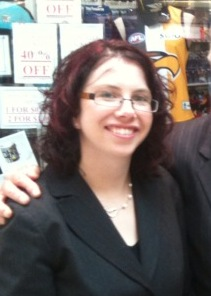
- Incumbent; Amanda Rishworth since 13 May 2025
- Department of Employment and Workplace Relations
- Style: The Honourable
- Appointer: Governor-General; on the advice of the prime minister
- Inaugural holder: Harold Holt (as Minister for Labour and National Service)
- Formation: 28 October 1940
- Website: ministers.dewr.gov.au/hon-amanda-rishworth-mp

The Minister for Employment and Workplace Relations is an Australian Government cabinet position which is currently held by Amanda Rishworth following her swearing-in on 13 May 2025 as a result of Anthony Albanese's Labor government being re-elected at the 2025 Australian federal election.

In the Government of Australia, the minister administers this portfolio through the Department of Employment and Workplace Relations.

== Portfolio scope ==
Other bodies in these portfolios include,:

- Asbestos Safety and Eradication Agency
- Australian Building and Construction Commission (abolished in 2023)
- Comcare
- Fair Work Commission
- Fair Work Ombudsman
- Registered Organisations Commission
- Safe Work Australia
- Workplace Gender Equality Agency

== List of ministers for employment ==
The following individuals have been appointed as the Minister for Employment and Workplace Relations, or any of its precedent titles:

Order	Minister	Party	Prime Minister	Title	Term start	Term end	Term in office
1	Harold Holt	United Australia	Menzies	Minister for Labour and National Service	28 October 1940	29 August 1941	344 days
1	Harold Holt	United Australia	Fadden	Minister for Labour and National Service	29 August 1941	7 October 1941	344 days
2	Eddie Ward	Labor	Curtin	Minister for Labour and National Service	7 October 1941	21 September 1943	1 year, 349 days
3	Jack Holloway	Labor	Curtin	Minister for Labour and National Service	21 September 1943	6 July 1945	6 years, 89 days
3	Jack Holloway	Labor	Forde	Minister for Labour and National Service	6 July 1945	13 July 1945	6 years, 89 days
3	Jack Holloway	Labor	Chifley	Minister for Labour and National Service	13 July 1945	19 December 1949	6 years, 89 days
(1)	Harold Holt	Liberal	Menzies	Minister for Labour and National Service	19 December 1949	10 December 1958	8 years, 356 days
4	William McMahon	Liberal	Menzies	Minister for Labour and National Service	10 December 1958	26 January 1966	7 years, 47 days
5	Les Bury	Liberal	Holt	Minister for Labour and National Service	26 January 1966	19 December 1967	3 years, 290 days
5	Les Bury	Liberal	McEwen	Minister for Labour and National Service	19 December 1967	10 January 1968	3 years, 290 days
5	Les Bury	Liberal	Gorton	Minister for Labour and National Service	10 January 1968	12 November 1969	3 years, 290 days
6	Billy Snedden	Liberal	Gorton	Minister for Labour and National Service	12 November 1969	10 March 1971	1 year, 130 days
6	Billy Snedden	Liberal	McMahon	Minister for Labour and National Service	10 March 1971	22 March 1971	1 year, 130 days
7	Phillip Lynch	Liberal	McMahon	Minister for Labour and National Service	22 March 1971	5 December 1972	1 year, 258 days
8	Lance Barnard^{1}	Labor	Whitlam	Minister for Labour and National Service	5 December 1972	19 December 1972	14 days
9	Clyde Cameron	Labor	Whitlam	Minister for Labour	19 December 1972	12 June 1974	2 years, 169 days
9	Clyde Cameron	Labor	Whitlam	Minister for Labour and Immigration	12 June 1974	6 June 1975	2 years, 169 days
10	Jim McClelland	Labor	Whitlam	Minister for Labour and Immigration	6 June 1975	11 November 1975	158 days
11	Tony Street	Liberal	Fraser	Minister for Labour and Immigration	11 November 1975	22 December 1975	3 years, 24 days
11	Tony Street	Liberal	Fraser	Minister for Employment and Industrial Relations	22 December 1975	5 December 1978	3 years, 24 days
12	Ian Viner	Liberal	Fraser	Minister for Employment and Youth Affairs	5 December 1978	6 April 1981	2 years, 122 days
13	Neil Brown	Liberal	Fraser	Minister for Employment and Youth Affairs	6 April 1981	7 May 1982	1 year, 31 days
14	Ian Macphee	Liberal	Fraser	Minister for Employment and Industrial Relations	7 May 1982	11 March 1983	308 days
15	Ralph Willis	Labor	Hawke	Minister for Employment and Industrial Relations	11 March 1983	24 July 1987	4 years, 135 days
16	John Dawkins	Labor	Hawke	Minister for Employment, Education and Training	24 July 1987	20 December 1991	4 years, 156 days
16	John Dawkins	Labor	Keating	Minister for Employment, Education and Training	20 December 1991	27 December 1991	4 years, 156 days
17	Kim Beazley	Labor	Keating	Minister for Employment, Education and Training	27 December 1991	23 December 1993	1 year, 361 days
18	Simon Crean	Labor	Keating	Minister for Employment, Education and Training	23 December 1993	11 March 1996	2 years, 79 days
19	Amanda Vanstone	Liberal	Howard	Minister for Employment, Education, Training and Youth Affairs	11 March 1996	9 October 1997	1 year, 212 days
20	David Kemp	Liberal	Howard	Minister for Employment, Education, Training and Youth Affairs	9 October 1997	21 October 1998	1 year, 12 days
21	Peter Reith	Liberal	Howard	Minister for Employment, Workplace Relations and Small Business	21 October 1998	30 January 2001	2 years, 101 days
22	Tony Abbott	Liberal	Howard	Minister for Employment, Workplace Relations and Small Business	30 January 2001	26 November 2001	2 years, 250 days
22	Tony Abbott	Liberal	Howard	Minister for Employment and Workplace Relations	26 November 2001	7 October 2003	2 years, 250 days
23	Kevin Andrews	Liberal	Howard	Minister for Employment and Workplace Relations	7 October 2003	30 January 2007	3 years, 115 days
24	Joe Hockey	Liberal	Howard	Minister for Employment and Workplace Relations	30 January 2007	3 December 2007	307 days
25	Julia Gillard	Labor	Rudd	Minister for Employment and Workplace Relations	3 December 2007	24 June 2010	2 years, 207 days
25	Julia Gillard	Labor	Gillard	Minister for Employment and Workplace Relations	24 June 2010	28 June 2010	2 years, 207 days
(18)	Simon Crean	Labor	Gillard	Minister for Employment and Workplace Relations	28 June 2010	14 September 2010	78 days
26	Chris Evans	Labor	Gillard	Minister for Tertiary Education, Skills, Jobs and Workplace Relations	14 September 2010	14 December 2011	1 year, 91 days
27	Bill Shorten	Labor	Gillard	Minister for Employment and Workplace Relations	14 December 2011	1 July 2013	1 year, 199 days
28	Brendan O'Connor	Labor	Rudd	Minister for Employment; Minister for Skills and Training	1 July 2013	18 September 2013	79 days
29	Eric Abetz	Liberal	Abbott	Minister for Employment	18 September 2013	15 September 2015	2 years, 3 days
29	Eric Abetz	Liberal	Turnbull	Minister for Employment	15 September 2015	21 September 2015	2 years, 3 days
30	Michaelia Cash	Liberal	Turnbull	Minister for Employment	21 September 2015	20 December 2017	2 years, 341 days
30	Michaelia Cash	Liberal	Turnbull	Minister for Jobs and Innovation	20 December 2017	28 August 2018	2 years, 341 days
31	Kelly O'Dwyer	Liberal	Morrison	Minister for Jobs and Industrial Relations	28 August 2018	11 April 2019	226 days
(30)	Michaelia Cash	Liberal	Morrison	Minister for Employment, Skills, Small and Family Business	29 May 2019	30 March 2021	1 year, 305 days
32	Stuart Robert	Liberal	Morrison	Minister for Employment, Workforce, Skills, Small and Family Business	30 March 2021	23 May 2022	1 year, 54 days
33	Richard Marles	Labor	Albanese	Minister for Employment	23 May 2022	1 June 2022	9 days
34	Tony Burke	Labor	Albanese	Minister for Employment and Workplace Relations	1 June 2022	29 July 2024	2 years, 58 days
35	Murray Watt	Labor	Albanese	Minister for Employment and Workplace Relations	29 July 2024	13 May 2025	288 days
36	Amanda Rishworth	Labor	Albanese	Minister for Employment and Workplace Relations	13 May 2025	Incumbent	1 year, 165 days

Notes

^{1} Barnard was part of a two-man ministry that comprised Barnard and Gough Whitlam for fourteen days until the full ministry was commissioned.
^{2} Despite the First Rudd ministry ending on 24 June 2010, Gillard was Minister for Employment and Workplace Relations for four days in her first ministry, between 24 June and 28 June 2010, when the revised ministry was commissioned.

== List of ministers for Workplace Relations ==
The following individuals have been appointed as Minister for Workplace Relations, or any of its subsequent titles:

Order	Minister	Party	Prime Minister	Title	Term start	Term end	Term in office
1	Tony Street	Liberal	Fraser	Minister for Employment and Industrial Relations	22 December 1975	5 December 1978	4 years, 358 days
1	Tony Street	Liberal	Fraser	Minister for Industrial Relations	5 December 1978	3 November 1980	4 years, 358 days
2	Andrew Peacock	Liberal	Fraser	Minister for Industrial Relations	3 November 1980	16 April 1981	164 days
3	Ian Viner	Liberal	Fraser	Minister for Industrial Relations	16 April 1981	7 May 1982	1 year, 21 days
4	Ian Macphee	Liberal	Fraser	Minister for Employment and Industrial Relations	7 May 1982	11 March 1983	308 days
5	Ralph Willis	Labor	Hawke	Minister for Employment and Industrial Relations	11 March 1983	24 July 1987	5 years, 175 days
5	Ralph Willis	Labor	Hawke	Minister for Industrial Relations	24 July 1987	2 September 1988	5 years, 175 days
6	Peter Morris	Labor	Hawke	Minister for Industrial Relations	2 September 1988	4 April 1990	1 year, 214 days
7	Peter Cook	Labor	Hawke	Minister for Industrial Relations	4 April 1990	20 December 1991	2 years, 354 days
7	Peter Cook	Labor	Keating	Minister for Industrial Relations	20 December 1991	24 March 1993	2 years, 354 days
8	Laurie Brereton	Labor	Keating	Minister for Industrial Relations	24 March 1993	11 March 1996	2 years, 353 days
9	Peter Reith	Liberal	Howard	Minister for Industrial Relations	11 March 1996	18 July 1997	4 years, 325 days
9	Peter Reith	Liberal	Howard	Minister for Workplace Relations and Small Business	18 July 1997	21 October 1998	4 years, 325 days
9	Peter Reith	Liberal	Howard	Minister for Employment, Workplace Relations and Small Business	21 October 1998	30 January 2001	4 years, 325 days
10	Tony Abbott	Liberal	Howard	Minister for Employment, Workplace Relations and Small Business	30 January 2001	26 November 2001	2 years, 250 days
10	Tony Abbott	Liberal	Howard	Minister for Employment and Workplace Relations	26 November 2001	7 October 2003	2 years, 250 days
11	Kevin Andrews	Liberal	Howard	Minister for Employment and Workplace Relations	7 October 2003	30 January 2007	3 years, 115 days
12	Joe Hockey	Liberal	Howard	Minister for Employment and Workplace Relations	30 January 2007	3 December 2007	307 days
13	Julia Gillard	Labor	Rudd	Minister for Employment and Workplace Relations	3 December 2007	24 June 2010	2 years, 207 days
13	Julia Gillard	Labor	Gillard	Minister for Employment and Workplace Relations	24 June 2010	28 June 2010	2 years, 207 days
14	Simon Crean	Labor	Gillard	Minister for Employment and Workplace Relations	28 June 2010	14 September 2010	78 days
15	Chris Evans	Labor	Gillard	Minister for Tertiary Education, Skills, Jobs and Workplace Relations	14 September 2010	14 December 2011	1 year, 91 days
16	Bill Shorten	Labor	Gillard	Minister for Employment and Workplace Relations	14 December 2011	1 July 2013	1 year, 278 days
16	Bill Shorten	Labor	Rudd	Minister for Workplace Relations	1 July 2013	18 September 2013	1 year, 278 days
17	Kelly O'Dwyer	Liberal	Morrison	Minister for Jobs and Industrial Relations	28 August 2018	11 April 2019	226 days
18	Christian Porter	Liberal	Morrison	Minister for Industrial Relations	29 May 2019	30 March 2021	1 year, 305 days
19	Michaelia Cash	Liberal	Morrison	Minister for Industrial Relations	30 March 2021	23 May 2022	1 year, 54 days
20	Tony Burke	Labor	Albanese	Minister for Employment and Workplace Relations	1 June 2022	29 July 2024	2 years, 58 days
21	Murray Watt	Labor	Albanese	Minister for Employment and Workplace Relations	29 July 2024	13 May 2025	288 days
22	Amanda Rishworth	Labor	Albanese	Minister for Employment and Workplace Relations	13 May 2025	Incumbent	1 year, 165 days

== Former ministerial titles ==
=== List of ministers for employment participation ===
The following individuals have been appointed as Minister for Employment Participation, or any of its precedent titles:

Order	Minister	Party	Prime Minister	Title	Term start	Term end	Term in office
1	Clyde Holding	Labor	Hawke	Minister for Employment Services and Youth Affairs	24 July 1987	19 January 1988	179 days
2	Peter Duncan	Labor	Hawke	Minister for Employment and Education Services	19 January 1988	4 April 1990	2 years, 75 days
3	Peter Baldwin	Labor	Hawke	Minister for Employment and Education Services	4 April 1990	7 May 1990	2 years, 354 days
3	Peter Baldwin	Labor	Keating	Minister for Higher Education and Employment Services	7 May 1990	20 December 1991	2 years, 354 days
3	Peter Baldwin	Labor	Keating	Minister for Higher Education and Employment Services	20 December 1991	24 March 1993	2 years, 354 days
4	Tony Abbott	Liberal	Howard	Minister for Employment Services	21 October 1998	30 January 2001	2 years, 101 days
5	Mal Brough	Liberal	Howard	Minister for Employment Services	14 February 2001	18 July 2004	3 years, 155 days
6	Fran Bailey	Liberal	Howard	Minister for Employment Services	18 July 2004	26 October 2004	100 days
7	Peter Dutton	Liberal	Howard	Minister for Workforce Participation	26 October 2004	27 January 2006	1 year, 93 days
8	Sharman Stone	Liberal	Howard	Minister for Workforce Participation	27 January 2006	3 December 2007	1 year, 310 days
9	Brendan O'Connor	Labor	Rudd	Minister for Employment Participation	3 December 2007	9 June 2009	1 year, 188 days
10	Mark Arbib	Labor	Rudd	Minister for Employment Participation	9 June 2009	28 June 2010	1 year, 97 days
10	Mark Arbib	Labor	Gillard	Minister for Employment Participation	28 June 2010	14 September 2010	1 year, 97 days
11	Kate Ellis	Labor	Gillard	Minister for Employment Participation and Childcare	14 September 2010	14 December 2011	3 years, 4 days
11	Kate Ellis	Labor	Gillard	Minister for Employment Participation	14 December 2011	1 July 2013	3 years, 4 days
11	Kate Ellis	Labor	Rudd	Minister for Employment Participation	1 July 2013	18 September 2013	3 years, 4 days
12	Luke Hartsuyker	Nationals	Abbott	Assistant Minister for Employment	18 September 2013	15 September 2015	2 years, 3 days
12	Luke Hartsuyker	Nationals	Turnbull	Assistant Minister for Employment	15 September 2015	21 September 2015	2 years, 3 days

== List of assistant ministers ==
The following individuals have been appointed as Assistant Minister for Employment and Workplace Relations, or any of its precedent titles:

Order	Minister	Party	Prime Minister	Title	Term start	Term end	Term in office
1	Zed Seselja	Liberal	Turnbull	Assistant Minister for Science, Jobs and Innovation	20 December 2017	23 August 2018	246 days
2	Andrew Leigh	Labor	Albanese	Assistant Minister for Employment	31 May 2023	13 May 2025	1 year, 347 days
3	Patrick Gorman	Labor	Albanese	Assistant Minister for Employment and Workplace Relations	13 May 2025	Incumbent	1 year, 165 days
