= Minister for Skills and Training =

Australian cabinet position

- Commonwealth Coat of Arms

- Flag of Australia

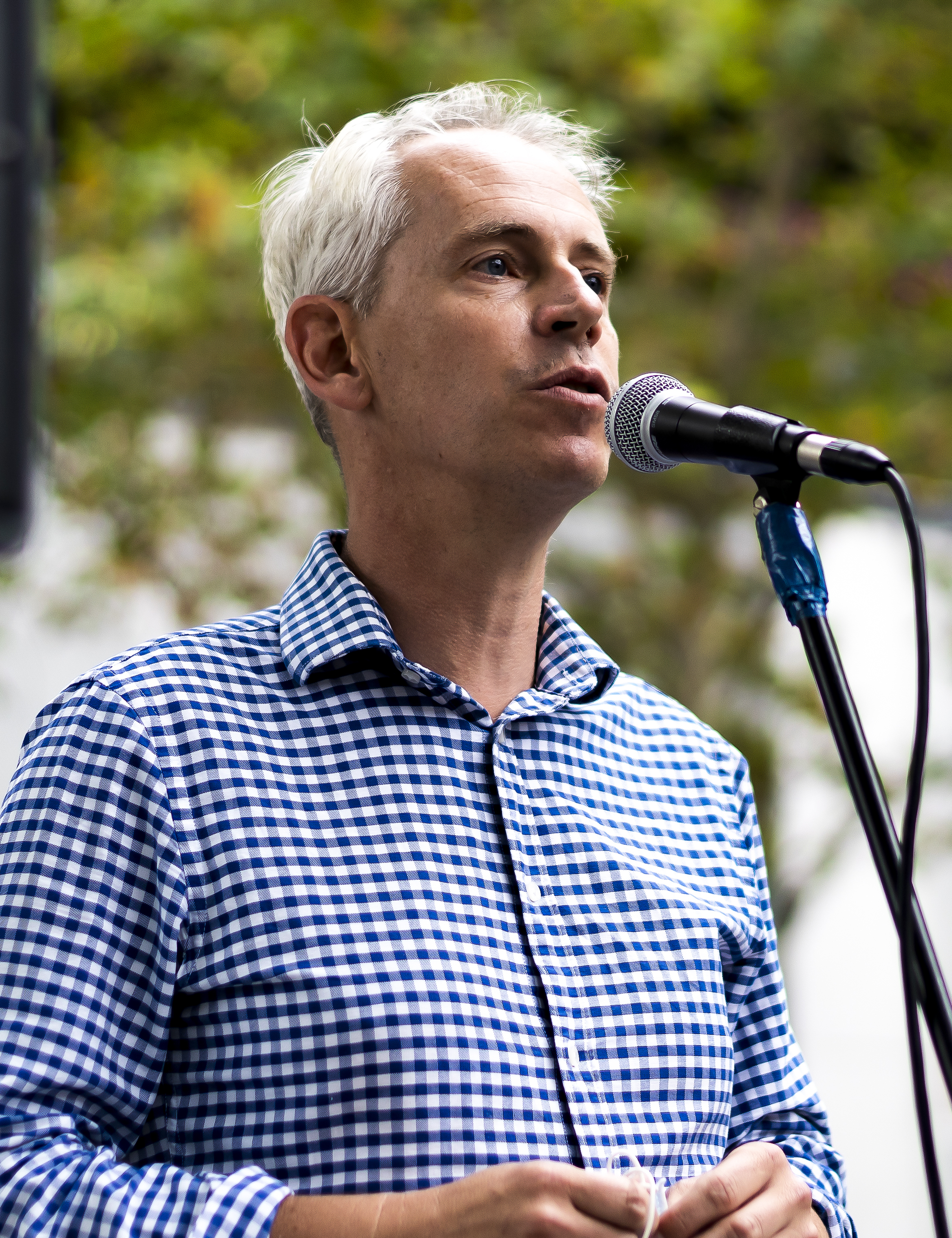
- Incumbent; Andrew Giles since 29 July 2024
- Department of Employment and Workplace Relations
- Style: The Honourable
- Appointer: Governor-General on the recommendation of the Prime Minister of Australia
- Inaugural holder: Ross Free (as Minister for Schools, Vocational Education and Training)
- Formation: 24 March 1993
- Website: ministers.dewr.gov.au/hon-andrew-giles-mp

The Minister for Skills and Training is a position currently held by Andrew Giles in the Albanese ministry since July 2024. In the Government of Australia, the minister administers this portfolio through the Department of Employment and Workplace Relations.

== List of ministers for skills and training ==
The following individuals have been appointed as Minister for Skills and Training, or any of its precedent titles:

Order	Minister	Party	Prime Minister	Title	Term start	Term end	Term in office
1	Peter Baldwin	Labor	Hawke	Minister for Higher Education and Employment Services	7 May 1990	20 December 1991	2 years, 321 days
1	Peter Baldwin	Labor	Keating	Minister for Higher Education and Employment Services	20 December 1991	24 March 1993	2 years, 321 days
2	Ross Free	Labor	Keating	Minister for Schools, Vocational Education and Training	24 March 1993	11 March 1996	3 years, 18 days
3	David Kemp	Liberal	Howard	Minister for Schools, Vocational Education and Training	11 March 1996	6 October 1997	1 year, 209 days
4	Chris Ellison	Liberal	Howard	Minister for Schools, Vocational Education and Training	6 October 1997	21 October 1998	1 year, 15 days
5	Gary Hardgrave	Liberal	Howard	Minister for Vocational and Technical Education	22 October 2004	23 January 2007	2 years, 93 days
6	Andrew Robb	Liberal	Howard	Minister for Vocational and Further Education	23 January 2007	3 December 2007	314 days
7	Chris Evans	Labor	Gillard	Minister for Tertiary Education, Skills, Jobs and Workplace Relations	14 September 2010	14 December 2011	2 years, 172 days
7	Chris Evans	Labor	Gillard	Minister for Tertiary Education, Skills, Science and Research	14 December 2011	2 February 2013	2 years, 172 days
8	Chris Bowen	Labor	Gillard	Minister for Tertiary Education, Skills, Science and Research	2 February 2013	22 March 2013	48 days
9	Craig Emerson	Labor	Gillard	Minister for Tertiary Education, Skills, Science and Research	25 March 2013	26 June 2013	93 days
10	Brendan O'Connor	Labor	Rudd	Minister for Skills and Training	1 July 2013	18 September 2013	79 days
11	Simon Birmingham	Liberal	Abbott	Assistant Minister for Education and Training	23 December 2014	15 September 2015	272 days
11	Simon Birmingham	Liberal	Turnbull	Assistant Minister for Education and Training	15 September 2015	21 September 2015	272 days
12	Luke Hartsuyker	National	Turnbull	Minister for Vocational Education and Skills	21 September 2015	18 February 2016	150 days
13	Scott Ryan	Liberal	Turnbull	Minister for Vocational Education and Skills	18 February 2016	19 July 2016	152 days
14	Michaelia Cash	Liberal	Morrison	Minister for Small and Family Business, Skills and Vocational Education	28 August 2018	29 May 2019	2 years, 214 days
14	Michaelia Cash	Liberal	Morrison	Minister for Employment, Skills, Small and Family Business	29 May 2019	30 March 2021	2 years, 214 days
15	Stuart Robert	Liberal	Morrison	Minister for Employment, Workforce, Skills, Small and Family Business	30 March 2021	23 May 2022	1 year, 54 days
(10)	Brendan O'Connor	Labor	Albanese	Minister for Skills and Training	1 June 2022	29 July 2024	2 years, 58 days
16	Andrew Giles	Labor	Albanese	Minister for Skills and Training	29 July 2024	Incumbent	2 years, 40 days

== List of assistant ministers ==
The following individuals have been appointed as Assistant Minister for Vocational Education and Skills, or any of its precedent titles:

Order	Minister	Party affiliation	Prime Minister	Ministerial title	Term start	Term end	Term in office
1	Sharon Bird	Labor	Gillard	Minister for Higher Education and Skills	25 March 2013	1 July 2013	98 days
2	Karen Andrews	LNP	Turnbull	Assistant Minister for Vocational Education and Skills	19 July 2016	28 August 2018	2 years, 40 days
