= Minister for Immigration and Citizenship =

Australian cabinet position

- Commonwealth Coat of Arms

- Flag of Australia

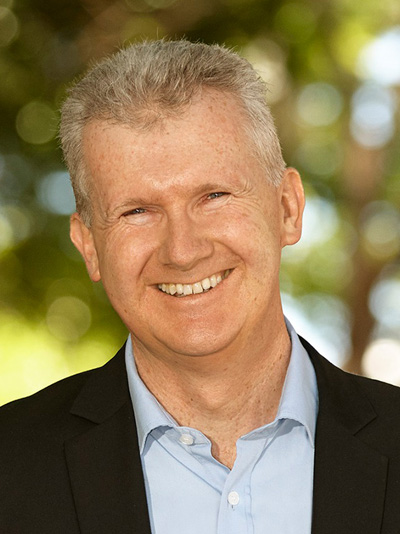
- Incumbent; Tony Burke since 29 July 2024
- Department of Home Affairs
- Style: The Honourable
- Appointer: Governor-General on the advice of the prime minister
- Inaugural holder: Arthur Calwell (as Minister for Immigration)
- Formation: 19 December 1949
- Website: minister.homeaffairs.gov.au/ministers-for-home-affairs/the-hon-tony-burke-mp

The Minister for Immigration and Citizenship is a ministerial post of the Australian Government and is currently held by Tony Burke since July 2024 in the Albanese ministry.

The post was created in 1945 and its inaugural officeholder was Arthur Calwell as the Minister for Immigration. On 20 December 2017, Prime Minister Malcolm Turnbull introduced a new major portfolio responsible for national security: Home Affairs. The Hon Peter Dutton MP retained the duties of Minister for Immigration and Border Protection, with additional responsibilities awarded as the Minister for Home Affairs. Following the appointment of Prime Minister Scott Morrison in August 2018, Morrison re-appointed Peter Dutton to the Home Affairs Ministry, previously introduced to the 'super-Ministry' under the Turnbull government in December 2017, and appointed David Coleman as Immigration Minister.

== Scope ==
The portfolio and department were created in July 1945, during the last months of World War II. Previously, immigration affairs were handled by the Minister for Home Affairs (1901–1932) and the Minister for the Interior (1932–1945), except that between January 1925 and January 1928 Victor Wilson and Thomas Paterson were Ministers for Markets and Migration.

The Minister for Immigration, Multicultural Affairs and Citizenship was usually one of the senior members of Cabinet, although between the Tenth Menzies Ministry and the Third Fraser Ministry, the post was downgraded to that of a junior minister. The minister and department have on several occasions been responsible for another portfolio in addition to immigration, such as ethnic/multicultural affairs, local government or border protection.

== List of ministers for immigration ==
The following individuals have held responsibility for immigration:

Order	Minister	Party	Prime Minister	Title	Term start	Term end	Term in office
1	Arthur Calwell	Labor	Chifley	Minister for Immigration	13 July 1945	19 December 1949	4 years, 159 days
2	Harold Holt	Liberal	Menzies	Minister for Immigration	19 December 1949	24 October 1956	6 years, 310 days
3	Athol Townley	Liberal	Menzies	Minister for Immigration	24 October 1956	19 March 1958	1 year, 146 days
4	Alick Downer	Liberal	Menzies	Minister for Immigration	19 March 1958	18 December 1963	5 years, 274 days
5	Hubert Opperman	Liberal	Menzies	Minister for Immigration	18 December 1963	26 January 1966	2 years, 361 days
5	Hubert Opperman	Liberal	Holt	Minister for Immigration	26 January 1966	14 December 1966	2 years, 361 days
6	Billy Snedden	Liberal	Holt	Minister for Immigration	14 December 1966	19 December 1967	2 years, 333 days
6	Billy Snedden	Liberal	McEwen	Minister for Immigration	19 December 1967	10 January 1968	2 years, 333 days
6	Billy Snedden	Liberal	Gorton	Minister for Immigration	10 January 1968	12 November 1969	2 years, 333 days
7	Phillip Lynch	Liberal	McMahon	Minister for Immigration	12 November 1969	22 March 1971	1 year, 130 days
8	Jim Forbes	Liberal	McMahon	Minister for Immigration	22 March 1971	5 December 1972	1 year, 258 days
9	Lance Barnard^{1}	Labor	Whitlam	Minister for Immigration	5 December 1972	19 December 1972	14 days
10	Al Grassby	Labor	Whitlam	Minister for Immigration	19 December 1972	12 June 1974	1 year, 175 days
11	Clyde Cameron	Labor	Whitlam	Minister for Labour and Immigration	12 June 1974	6 June 1975	359 days
12	Jim McClelland	Labor	Whitlam	Minister for Labour and Immigration	6 June 1975	11 November 1975	158 days
13	Tony Street	Liberal	Fraser	Minister for Labour and Immigration	12 November 1975	22 December 1975	40 days
14	Michael MacKellar	Liberal	Fraser	Minister for Immigration and Ethnic Affairs	22 December 1975	8 December 1979	3 years, 351 days
15	Ian Macphee	Liberal	Fraser	Minister for Immigration and Ethnic Affairs	8 December 1979	7 May 1982	2 years, 150 days
16	John Hodges	Liberal	Fraser	Minister for Immigration and Ethnic Affairs	7 May 1982	11 March 1983	308 days
17	Stewart West	Labor	Hawke	Minister for Immigration and Ethnic Affairs	11 March 1983	13 December 1984	1 year, 277 days
18	Chris Hurford	Labor	Hawke	Minister for Immigration and Ethnic Affairs	13 December 1984	16 February 1987	2 years, 65 days
19	Mick Young	Labor	Hawke	Minister for Immigration, Local Government and Ethnic Affairs	16 February 1987	12 February 1988	361 days
20	Clyde Holding	Labor	Hawke	Minister for Immigration, Local Government and Ethnic Affairs	12 February 1988	2 September 1988	203 days
21	Robert Ray	Labor	Hawke	Minister for Immigration, Local Government and Ethnic Affairs	2 September 1988	4 April 1990	1 year, 214 days
22	Gerry Hand	Labor	Hawke	Minister for Immigration, Local Government and Ethnic Affairs	4 April 1990	20 December 1991	2 years, 354 days
22	Gerry Hand	Labor	Keating	Minister for Immigration, Local Government and Ethnic Affairs	20 December 1991	24 March 1993	2 years, 354 days
23	Nick Bolkus	Labor	Keating	Minister for Immigration and Ethnic Affairs	24 March 1993	11 March 1996	2 years, 353 days
24	Philip Ruddock	Liberal	Howard	Minister for Immigration and Multicultural Affairs	11 March 1996	26 November 2001	7 years, 210 days
24	Philip Ruddock	Liberal	Howard	Minister for Immigration, Multicultural and Indigenous Affairs	26 November 2001	7 October 2003	7 years, 210 days
25	Amanda Vanstone	Liberal	Howard	Minister for Immigration, Multicultural and Indigenous Affairs	7 October 2003	27 January 2006	3 years, 115 days
25	Amanda Vanstone	Liberal	Howard	Minister for Immigration and Multicultural Affairs	27 January 2006	30 January 2007	3 years, 115 days
26	Kevin Andrews	Liberal	Howard	Minister for Immigration and Citizenship	30 January 2007	3 December 2007	307 days
27	Chris Evans	Labor	Rudd	Minister for Immigration and Citizenship	3 December 2007	24 June 2010	2 years, 285 days
27	Chris Evans	Labor	Gillard	Minister for Immigration and Citizenship	24 June 2010	14 September 2010	2 years, 285 days
28	Chris Bowen	Labor	Gillard	Minister for Immigration and Citizenship	14 September 2010	4 February 2013	2 years, 143 days
29	Brendan O'Connor	Labor	Gillard	Minister for Immigration and Citizenship	4 February 2013	1 July 2013	147 days
30	Tony Burke	Labor	Rudd	Minister for Immigration, Multicultural Affairs and Citizenship	1 July 2013	18 September 2013	79 days
31	Scott Morrison	Liberal	Abbott	Minister for Immigration and Border Protection	18 September 2013	23 December 2014	1 year, 96 days
32	Peter Dutton	Liberal	Abbott	Minister for Immigration and Border Protection	23 December 2014	15 September 2015	3 years, 241 days
32	Peter Dutton	Liberal	Turnbull	Minister for Immigration and Border Protection	15 September 2015	21 August 2018	3 years, 241 days
33	David Coleman	Liberal	Morrison	Minister for Immigration, Citizenship and Multicultural Affairs	28 August 2018	29 May 2019	1 year, 107 days
33	David Coleman	Liberal	Morrison	Minister for Immigration, Citizenship, Migrant Services and Multicultural Affairs	29 May 2019	13 December 2019	1 year, 107 days
(acting)	Alan Tudge	Liberal	Morrison	Minister for Immigration, Citizenship, Migrant Services and Multicultural Affairs	13 December 2019	22 December 2020	1 year, 9 days
34	Alex Hawke	Liberal	Morrison	Minister for Immigration, Citizenship, Migrant Services and Multicultural Affairs	22 December 2020	23 May 2022	1 year, 152 days
35	Andrew Giles	Labor	Albanese	Minister for Immigration, Citizenship and Multicultural Affairs	1 June 2022	29 July 2024	2 years, 58 days
(30)	Tony Burke	Labor	Albanese	Minister for Immigration and Multicultural Affairs	29 July 2024	13 May 2025	2 years, 40 days
(30)	Tony Burke	Labor	Albanese	Minister for Immigration and Citizenship	13 May 2025	Incumbent	2 years, 40 days

Notes

^{1} Barnard was one of a two-man ministry consisting of himself and Gough Whitlam for two weeks until the full ministry was announced.

== List of ministers for citizenship ==
The following individuals have held responsibility for citizenship or any precedent titles:

Order	Minister	Party affiliation	Prime Minister	Ministerial title	Term start	Term end	Term in office
1	Gary Hardgrave	Liberal	Howard	Minister for Citizenship and Multicultural Affairs	26 November 2001	26 October 2004	2 years, 335 days
2	Peter McGauran	National	Howard	Minister for Citizenship and Multicultural Affairs	26 October 2004	6 July 2005	253 days
3	John Cobb	National	Howard	Minister for Citizenship and Multicultural Affairs	6 July 2005	27 January 2006	205 days
4	Kevin Andrews	Liberal	Howard	Minister for Immigration and Citizenship	30 January 2007	3 December 2007	307 days
5	Chris Evans	Labor	Rudd	Minister for Immigration and Citizenship	3 December 2007	24 June 2010	2 years, 285 days
5	Chris Evans	Labor	Gillard	Minister for Immigration and Citizenship	24 June 2010	14 September 2010	2 years, 285 days
6	Chris Bowen	Labor	Gillard	Minister for Immigration and Citizenship	14 September 2010	4 February 2013	2 years, 143 days
7	Brendan O'Connor	Labor	Gillard	Minister for Immigration and Citizenship	4 February 2013	1 July 2013	147 days
8	Alan Tudge	Liberal	Turnbull	Minister for Citizenship and Multicultural Affairs	20 December 2017	23 August 2018	246 days
9	David Coleman	Liberal	Morrison	Minister for Immigration, Citizenship and Multicultural Affairs	28 August 2018	29 May 2019	1 year, 107 days
9	David Coleman	Liberal	Morrison	Minister for Immigration, Citizenship, Migrant Services and Multicultural Affairs	29 May 2019	13 December 2019	1 year, 107 days
(acting)	Alan Tudge	Liberal	Morrison	Minister for Immigration, Citizenship, Migrant Services and Multicultural Affairs	13 December 2019	22 December 2020	1 year, 9 days
10	Alex Hawke	Liberal	Morrison	Minister for Immigration, Citizenship, Migrant Services and Multicultural Affairs	22 December 2020	23 May 2022	1 year, 152 days
11	Andrew Giles	Labor	Albanese	Minister for Immigration, Citizenship and Multicultural Affairs	1 June 2022	29 July 2024	2 years, 58 days
12	Tony Burke	Labor	Albanese	Minister for Immigration and Citizenship	13 May 2025	Incumbent	1 year, 117 days

== Assistant ministers ==
=== Assistant ministers for immigration ===
The following individuals served as the Assistant Minister for Immigration, or any precedent titles:

Order	Minister	Party affiliation	Prime Minister	Ministerial title	Term start	Term end	Term in office
1	Teresa Gambaro	Liberal	Howard	Parliamentary Secretary to the Minister for Immigration and Citizenship	30 January 2007	21 March 2007	307 days
1	Teresa Gambaro	Liberal	Howard	Assistant Minister for Immigration and Citizenship	21 March 2007	3 December 2007	307 days
2	Laurie Ferguson	Labor	Rudd	Parliamentary Secretary for Multicultural Affairs and Settlement Services	3 December 2007	14 September 2010	2 years, 285 days
2	Laurie Ferguson	Labor	Gillard	Parliamentary Secretary for Multicultural Affairs and Settlement Services	3 December 2007	14 September 2010	2 years, 285 days
3	Kate Lundy	Labor	Gillard	Parliamentary Secretary for Immigration and Citizenship	14 September 2010	16 February 2011	1 year, 173 days
3	Kate Lundy	Labor	Gillard	Parliamentary Secretary for Immigration and Multicultural Affairs	16 February 2011	5 March 2012	1 year, 173 days
4	Michaelia Cash	Liberal	Abbott	Assistant Minister for Immigration and Border Protection	18 September 2013	15 September 2015	2 years, 3 days
4	Michaelia Cash	Liberal	Turnbull	Assistant Minister for Immigration and Border Protection	15 September 2015	21 September 2015	2 years, 3 days
5	James McGrath	Liberal	Turnbull	Assistant Minister for Immigration and Border Protection	18 February 2016	18 July 2016	151 days
6	Alex Hawke	Liberal	Turnbull	Assistant Minister for Immigration and Border Protection	19 July 2016	20 December 2017	1 year, 154 days
7	Matt Thistlethwaite	Labor	Albanese	Assistant Minister for Immigration	29 July 2024	incumbent	2 years, 40 days

=== Assistant ministers for citizenship ===
The following individuals served as the Assistant Minister for Citizenship, or any precedent titles:

Order	Minister	Party affiliation	Prime Minister	Ministerial title	Term start	Term end	Term in office
1	Teresa Gambaro	Liberal	Howard	Parliamentary Secretary to the Minister for Immigration and Citizenship	30 January 2007	21 March 2007	307 days
1	Teresa Gambaro	Liberal	Howard	Assistant Minister for Immigration and Citizenship	21 March 2007	3 December 2007	307 days
2	Laurie Ferguson	Labor	Rudd	Parliamentary Secretary for Multicultural Affairs and Settlement Services	3 December 2007	14 September 2010	2 years, 285 days
2	Laurie Ferguson	Labor	Gillard	Parliamentary Secretary for Multicultural Affairs and Settlement Services	3 December 2007	14 September 2010	2 years, 285 days
3	Kate Lundy	Labor	Gillard	Parliamentary Secretary for Immigration and Citizenship	14 September 2010	16 February 2011	155 days
4	Jason Wood	Liberal	Morrison	Assistant Minister for Customs, Community Safety and Multicultural Affairs	29 May 2019	22 May 2022	2 years, 358 days
5	Julian Hill	Labor	Albanese	Assistant Minister for Citizenship and Multicultural Affairs	29 July 2024	13 May 2025	2 years, 40 days
5	Julian Hill	Labor	Albanese	Assistant Minister for Citizenship, Customs and Multicultural Affairs	13 May 2025	Incumbent	2 years, 40 days
