= Brendan O'Connor (politician) =

Australian politician (born 1962)

The Honourable Brendan O'Connor
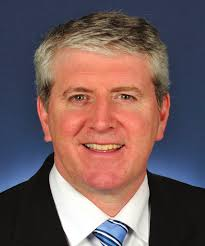

Minister for Skills and Training
- In office 1 June 2022 – 29 July 2024
- Prime Minister: Anthony Albanese
- Preceded by: Stuart Robert (as Minister for Employment, Workforce, Skills, Small and Family Business)
- Succeeded by: Andrew Giles
- In office 1 July 2013 – 18 September 2013
- Prime Minister: Kevin Rudd
- Preceded by: Craig Emerson (as Minister for Tertiary Education, Skills, Science and Research)
- Succeeded by: Position abolished

Minister for Employment
- In office 1 July 2013 – 18 September 2013
- Prime Minister: Kevin Rudd
- Preceded by: Bill Shorten
- Succeeded by: Eric Abetz

Minister for Immigration and Citizenship
- In office 4 February 2013 – 1 July 2013
- Prime Minister: Julia Gillard; Kevin Rudd
- Preceded by: Chris Bowen
- Succeeded by: Tony Burke

Minister for Small Business
- In office 5 March 2012 – 4 February 2013
- Prime Minister: Julia Gillard
- Preceded by: Mark Arbib
- Succeeded by: Chris Bowen

Minister for Housing
- In office 5 March 2012 – 27 June 2013
- Prime Minister: Julia Gillard
- Preceded by: Robert McClelland
- Succeeded by: Julie Collins

Minister for Human Services
- In office 14 December 2011 – 5 March 2012
- Prime Minister: Julia Gillard
- Preceded by: Tanya Plibersek
- Succeeded by: Kim Carr

Minister for Home Affairs
- In office 9 June 2009 – 14 December 2011
- Prime Minister: Kevin Rudd; Julia Gillard
- Preceded by: Bob Debus
- Succeeded by: Jason Clare

Minister for Employment Participation
- In office 3 December 2007 – 9 June 2009
- Prime Minister: Kevin Rudd
- Preceded by: Sharman Stone
- Succeeded by: Mark Arbib

Member of the Australian Parliament for Gorton
- In office 9 October 2004 – 28 March 2025
- Preceded by: Constituency established
- Succeeded by: Alice Jordan-Baird

Member of the Australian Parliament for Burke
- In office 10 November 2001 – 9 October 2004
- Preceded by: Neil O'Keefe
- Succeeded by: Constituency abolished

Personal details
- Born: Brendan Patrick O'Connor; 2 March 1962 (age 64) London, England
- Party: Labor
- Spouse: Jodi Dack (d. 2018)
- Children: 1 daughter
- Education: Monash University; Harvard University
- Website: brendanoconnor.com.au

Brendan Patrick O'Connor (born 2 March 1962) is an Australian politician who served as Minister for Skills and Training from 2022 to 2024 in the Albanese ministry after having served in the same portfolio in 2013 in the Second Rudd ministry. He is a member of the Australian Labor Party (ALP) and served in the House of Representatives from 2001 to 2025. He held ministerial office in the governments of Kevin Rudd and Julia Gillard from 2007 to 2013, including as a member of cabinet from 2012 to 2013. He was a member of the shadow cabinet from 2013 to 2022.

O'Connor announced his retirement from Federal Parliament effective at 2025 Australian federal election.

== Early life ==
O'Connor was born on 2 March 1962 in London, England. He is the son of Michael and Philomena O'Connor. His parents were both born in Ireland, his mother in Thurles and his father in Tralee. O'Connor was born with both Irish and British citizenship, renouncing the latter in the early 1980s. He acquired Australian citizenship by naturalisation in 1995 and renounced his Irish citizenship in 2001 in order to stand for parliament.

O'Connor arrived in Australia when he was six years old. He attended Aquinas College, Melbourne, and subsequently completed the degrees of Bachelor of Arts and Bachelor of Laws at Monash University. He also completed a diploma at Harvard University in the United States through the Harvard Trade Union Program.

== Union movement ==
While at university, O'Connor worked as a researcher for the Municipal Employees Union. He was the assistant national secretary of the Australian Services Union from 1993 to 2001.

== Early political involvement ==
A member of Labor Left, O'Connor is a member of the National Left faction of the Australian Labor Party and is a member of the Socialist Left faction of the Victorian branch of the Australian Labor Party. At the time of his endorsement for Burke in 2001 he was aligned with the 'Independent Left', a breakaway group from the Socialist Left. This group included Julia Gillard. O'Connor has been a close ally of Julia Gillard since they were both involved in student politics during the 1980s along with Michael O'Connor. In 2015, the Independent Left rejoined the Socialist Left.

== Parliament ==
=== First terms (2001–2007) ===
At the 2001 election, O'Connor was elected as the Member for Burke, When the division was abolished by the 2003 redistribution, O'Connor successfully contested the new electoral division of Gorton at the 2004 election.

In December 2005, he was elected to the position of Chair of the Federal Labor Industrial Relations Taskforce in a caucus ballot. The Taskforce investigated the adverse effects of the Howard Government's WorkChoices legislation, a controversial package of industrial relations changes.

Shortly after the election of Kevin Rudd to the office of federal Labor leader and Leader of the Opposition on 4 December 2006, O'Connor was appointed Shadow Parliamentary Secretary for Industrial Relations.

=== Government (2007–2013) ===
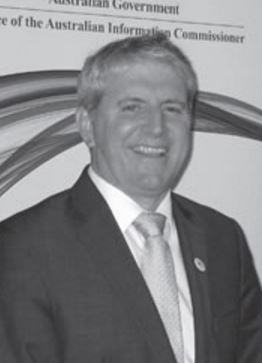
O'Connor as Home Affairs Minister in 2011.

Following the Labor victory at the 2007 federal election, Prime Minister Rudd announced that O'Connor would serve as the Minister for Employment Participation from 29 November 2007. As Minister he reformed the Job Network, replacing it with Job Services Australia. This streamlined seven separate employment services programs into a 'one-stop-shop' to provide job seekers with a more personalised service.

On 6 June 2009, O'Connor was announced as the Minister for Home Affairs in the First Rudd ministry, replacing Bob Debus who retired at the 2010 election. Following Labor's narrow victory, Prime Minister Julia Gillard allocated increased responsibilities to O'Connor. He became Minister for Home Affairs, Minister for Justice and Minister for Privacy and Freedom of Information. In this portfolio, O'Connor enacted several key policy reforms including: new and tougher laws to protect children from being procured and groomed online, achieving consensus for an R18+ video game classification after 10 years of debate at Standing Committee of Attorney-General; and introducing significant reforms of the anti-dumping regime in 20 years.

In December 2011, O'Connor became the Minister for Human Services and Minister Assisting for School Education.

On 5 March 2012, O'Connor was sworn in as Minister for Small Business, Minister for Housing and Minister for Homelessness. He was also promoted to Cabinet for the first time, becoming the first small business minister in Cabinet for more than a decade. In this role O'Connor introduced the first Australian Small Business Commissioner, on 2 January 2013. On 30 August 2012, O'Connor and the Council of Australian Governments released the Housing Supply and Affordability Reform report, proposing reforms to increase housing affordability in Australia.

On 4 February 2013, O'Connor was sworn in as Minister for Immigration and Citizenship. Following the June 2013 Labor leadership spill, O'Connor was appointed Minister for Employment and Minister for Skills and Training in the Second Rudd ministry.

=== Opposition (2013–2022) ===
After the ALP's defeat at the 2013 federal election, O'Connor was included in Bill Shorten's shadow cabinet. He was retained in shadow cabinet when Anthony Albanese succeeded Shorten as opposition leader after the 2019 election. O'Connor has held the portfolios of employment and workplace relations (2013–2019), special minister of state (2016), employment and industry (2019–2021), science (2019–2021), and small and family business (2019–2021). He succeeded Richard Marles as shadow minister for defence following a reshuffle in January 2021.

=== Government (2022–2025) ===
Following the 2022 federal election, O'Connor was appointed Minister for Skills and Training in the Albanese ministry.

O'Connor announced his retirement on 25 July 2024 effective at the next election. In the reshuffle of the Albanese ministry on 28 July 2024, whilst O'Connor's portfolio of Skills and Training was moved to the outer ministry and given to the former Immigration Minister Andrew Giles.

== Personal life ==
O'Connor was married to Jodi Dack until her death from breast cancer in August 2018; she had first been diagnosed in 2012. The couple had one daughter together.

O'Connor lives in Niddrie, Victoria.

Parliament of Australia
Preceded by Neil O'Keefe	Member for Burke; 2001–2004	Constituency abolished
New constituency	Member for Gorton; 2004–2025	Succeeded by Alice Jordan-Baird
Political offices
Preceded by Sharman Stone as Minister for Workforce Participation	Minister for Employment Participation; 2007–2009	Succeeded by Mark Arbib
Preceded by Bob Debus	Minister for Home Affairs; 2009–2011	Succeeded by Jason Clare
Preceded by Chris Ellison as Minister for Justice and Customs	Minister for Justice; 2010–2011	Succeeded by Jason Clare
New office	Minister for Privacy and Freedom of Information; 2010–2011	Office abolished
Preceded by Tanya Plibersek	Minister for Human Services; 2011–2012	Succeeded by Kim Carr
Preceded by Mark Arbib	Minister for Small Business; 2012–2013	Succeeded by Chris Bowen
Preceded by Robert McClelland	Minister for Housing; 2012–2013	Succeeded by Mark Butler
Preceded by Robert McClelland	Minister for Homelessness; 2012–2013	Succeeded by Mark Butler
Preceded by Chris Bowen	Minister for Immigration and Citizenship; 2013	Succeeded by Tony Burke
Preceded by Bill Shorten as Minister for Employment and Workplace Relations	Minister for Employment; 2013	Succeeded by Eric Abetz
Preceded by Craig Emerson as Minister for Tertiary Education, Skills, Science and Research	Minister for Skills and Training; 2013	Succeeded by Office abolished
Preceded by Stuart Robert as Minister for Employment, Workforce, Skills, Small and Family Business	Minister for Skills and Training; 2022–2024	Succeeded by Andrew Giles
