= 2012 Australian federal budget =

Australian federal budget 2012–13
- Submitted: 8 May 2012
- Submitted to: Parliament of Australia
- Country: Australia
- Parliament: 43rd
- Party: Australian Labor Party
- Treasurer: Wayne Swan
- Total revenue: $376.1 billion
- Total expenditures: $376.3 billion
- Surplus: $1.5 billion (Forecast)
- Website: http://www.budget.gov.au/2012-13/ 2012–13 Commonwealth Budget
- ^{‡}Numbers in italics are projections.

The 2012 Australian federal budget for the Australian financial year ended 30 June 2013 was presented on 8 May 2012 by the Treasurer of Australia, Wayne Swan, the fifth federal budget presented by Swan, and the second budget of the Gillard government. The budget was described as a "battlers" budget with benefits geared towards families and low income earners. It forecast a surplus of $1.5 billion in the financial year ended 30 June 2013.

The Gillard government emphasised the importance of returning the budget to a surplus so that the Reserve Bank of Australia may be in a better position to cut interest rates and thereby generate positive consumer sentiment. Swan was at pains to emphasise that the Bank would set rates independently. Swan had also stated it important for the confidence of sovereign debt investors after the 2008 financial crisis.

The budget set up funding for a new National Disability Insurance Scheme (NDIS). Measures to improve public dental health care, one of the conditions of support made by the Australian Greens with the Gillard government were addressed with more than $500 million worth of funding. Carbon pricing and the Minerals Resource Rent Tax were both introduced in July 2012.

== Forecasts ==
=== Surplus ===
The budget was expected to produce a surplus. The return to surplus has been criticised as a political imperative rather than an economic necessity. The Institute of Chartered Accountants believes that targeted public expenditure was still needed to sustain the Australian economy. Former Governor of the Reserve Bank of Australia, Bernie Fraser has dismissed the notion that delivering a surplus is critical, describing it as "a dud policy".

The surplus follows a projected $44 billion deficit for the 2011/12 financial year, up from the previous estimate of $36 billion. By abolishing the Education Tax Refund and bringing forward payments to families into the 2011/12 fiscal year, the Government was able to forecast its surplus for 2012/13.

The 2011/12 expanded deficit moves the Government's net debt position to 9.6% of GDP. Despite the spike in debt, the budget has not affected the nation's Triple A international credit rating.

=== Shortfall ===
In October 2012, Wayne Swan announced a budget update which revealed revenue downgrades worth $21 billion from projected tax revenue and $4 billion from the current financial year. Lower commodity prices and falling tax receipts reduced the current forecast surplus to $1.1 billion. Spot prices for iron ore, thermal coal and coking coal decreased by 15 to 35% since the budget was released in May. The update also showed the cost of processing asylum seekers has increased by $1.1 billion.

New spending cuts and extra charges worth $16 billion were announced. Visa application fees will increase, the baby bonus payment will decrease for second and subsequent children and the Medicare teen dental program was cancelled. Starting in 2014 companies with an annual turnover greater than $1 billion will have to pay tax in monthly instalments instead of quarterly.

== Revenue mix ==
Before the budget was released Swan had warned that the government revenues would see a downgrade by $5 billion in both the 2012–13 and 2013–14 financial years.

=== Taxation ===
$2 billion worth of lost tax revenue was due to a decline in company tax collections. $1 billion has been lost to weak collections from superannuation funds and a further $750 million of revenue was lost due to lower than expected collections of customs and excise duties.

High income earners on $300,000 or more are to have their superannuation contributions taxed at 30% instead of 15%. The Minerals Resource Rent Tax, a 30% tax on coal and iron ore companies worth more than $75 million, is being introduced. It is expected to generate $11 billion over three years, which will be used to support superannuation boosts, infrastructure costs and offset business tax cuts. Small business tax was expected to be reduced by 1% from 1 July. However this measure was abandoned.

The budget will introduce a small business "loss carryback" option as recommended by the Henry Tax Review. This will allow businesses to claim losses of up to $1 million against tax they have paid previously and will cost $700 million across three years.

The inbound duty-free allowance for cigarettes and tobacco was reduced from 250 to 50 cigarettes, bringing savings of $600 million.

== Expenditure mix ==
=== General government ===
The cost for managing asylum seeker boat arrivals has increased to $1.003 billion from an earlier estimate of $739 million. The number of asylum seekers entering Australia by boat is currently at its highest level ever.

Funding for the Australian Bureau of Statistics is being reduced by $255 million and the CSIRO is set to lose $25 million. Smaller cuts are also planned for the Australian National Library, National Film and Sound Archive and the National Museum of Australia.

=== Social security and welfare ===
The budget allocated $131.6 billion to social security and welfare spending. On 30 April 2012, Julia Gillard announced the budget will fund the National Disability Insurance Scheme starting from July 2013. The scheme is planned to assist 10,000 people with significant and permanent disabilities.

From July 2013, single, unemployed parents who claimed the parenting payment before 2007 will lose their parenting support payments when their youngest child turns eight, instead of the previous threshold of age sixteen. Welfare recipients who travel overseas for more than six weeks will have their payments reduced.

1.5 million families will see an increase family tax benefits starting from 1 July. Other families will lose Family Tax Benefit A because the eligibility age for children in this category is being reduced from 21 to under 18.

=== Infrastructure, transport and energy ===
$3.56 billion is being spent on the complete duplication of the Pacific Highway. The funding is being provided on the condition that a similar figure is spent on the highway by the New South Wales government. Minister for Roads and Ports, Duncan Gay has claimed there was an existing agreement based on an 80–20 funding split. The New South Wales state budget, which was handed down in June 2012, only allocated 20% of the cost for an upgrade.

=== Education ===
The budget is introducing the Schoolkids Bonus, a replacement for the under-used Education Tax Refund. Under the scheme, eligible families are able to claim $820 for each high school student and $410 for each primary school student. The bonus is expected to assist 2.2 million families.

$11.7 million worth of funding has been allocated for a one-off boost to the One Laptop Per Child in Australia, which will provide laptops for 50,000 students.

=== Defence ===
More than $4 billion of spending on defence projects is being reduced or deferred. The purchase of 12 Joint Strike Fighters will be delayed by two years and plans to equip the army with self-propelled artillery have been cancelled.

There is $214 million worth of funding for a number of international studies to select a new submarine to replace the Collins class submarines. 1,000 civilian positions at the Department of Defence are to be trimmed over the next four years.

=== Health ===
The public dental waiting list is being targeted with an injection of $345 million to reduce the backlog. Also being introduced in the budget are measures to reduce the lack of dental healthcare professionals in rural and remote areas and the co-ordination of dental work for disadvantaged people.

A 2011 report from the Productivity Commission suggested the aged care sector needed drastic reform and an investment plan to deal with a rapidly ageing population. The budget included $3.7 billion to reform the aged care system. Only $577 million of this is new funding spread across five years. $49.7 million has been allocated to support the national bowel cancer screening program.

=== Community services and culture ===
$63 million is being provided to SBS for the production of a new free-to-air national Indigenous television channel.

== Opposition and crossbench response ==
Shadow treasurer Joe Hockey has said the surplus was created by "cooking the books" and that it was confused. Tony Abbott was troubled by the debt ceiling being raised to $300 billion and said that a surplus was only the result of forward spending.

== Reception ==
Innes Willox from the Australian Industry Group claimed the budget undermined businesses ability to make long-term investments. Jennifer Westacott at the Business Council of Australia appreciated a return to surplus but also wanted a comprehensive audit of government spending. Brendan Lyon from Infrastructure Partnerships Australia described the budget as a "lost opportunity" and lamented that instead of directing funding to infrastructure projects, the budget directed funding to families.

== See also ==
- Australian national debt
- Economy of Australia
