= CFMMEU v Personnel Contracting Pty Ltd =

2022 judgment of the High Court of Australia

CFMMEU v Personnel Contracting
- Court: High Court of Australia
- Decided: 9 February 2022
- Citations: [2022] HCA 1, 398 ALR 404

Court membership
- Judges sitting: Kiefel CJ, Gageler, Keane, Gordon, Edelman, Steward and Gleeson JJ

CFMMEU v Personnel Contracting Pty Ltd [2022] HCA 1 is an Australian labour law case of the High Court of Australia on the employment relationship between an individual who signed a contract for services and a labour hire organisation. The High Court departed from the approach widely taken by lower courts in holding a "multi-factorial" approach to determining an employment relationship. The High Court found that the totality of the circumstances was not always the correct approach for identifying whether an individual was engaged as an employee or independent contractor. Rather, the contents of a contract may instead indicate the relationship. The High Court found the worker at the centre of the dispute between the parties was an employee of the labour hire agency for whom he had worked, rather than an independent contractor. The judgment means worker relationships will be defined by the terms of their contract.

== Background ==
The case involved an appeal from the Construction, Forestry, Maritime, Mining and Energy Union on behalf of an individual named Daniel McCourt, a British backpacker in Australia. McCourt had obtained work through a labour hire company named Personnel, which engaged him through an "Administrative Services Agreement" that described him as a "self-employed contractor".

Personnel assigned McCourt to work on construction sites run by its client, Hanssen, with whom McCourt never signed an employment contract. Because Personnel had a contract to provide labour hire services to its client, this created a trilateral agreement. McCourt performed work for which he was compensated at an hourly rate. This hourly rate was significantly lower than the one McCourt would have received if Personnel had hired him as an employee as opposed to an independent contractor.

In conjunction with the CFMMEU, which acted as his union representative, McCourt commenced proceedings against Personnel in the Federal Court of Australia. The parties sought orders against Personnel for compensation and penalties pursuant to the civil remedies provisions of the Fair Work Act 2009 (Cth). (Note: The civil remedy provisions for this case were sections 545, 546, and 547 of the Fair Work Act.) The crucial issue was whether McCourt was an employee of Personnel or an independent contractor.

Both the trial judge and the Full Court of the Federal Court applied the "multi-factorial" test to McCourt's engagement. This meant the written contract and the conduct of the parties were examined. The trial judge, Justice David O'Callaghan, observed that the terms of the Administrative Services Agreement "clearly indicated that the relationship between [Personnel] and McCourt was to be one of principal and self-employed contractor". O'Callaghan noted the factors included McCourt being referred to as a "Contractor" rather than "employee", that McCourt warranted he was self-employed, and that McCourt agreed not to represent himself as being an employee of Personnel". An appeal to the Full Court was rejected. The Full Court found McCourt's engagement, on its face, appeared to be one of employment; however, the terms within the signed Administrative Services Agreement indicated he was a self-employed contractor. In rejecting the appeal, Chief Justice James Allsop and Justice Michael Lee queried paying unskilled workers paid as independent contractors less than the wage to which employees are entitled, but pointed out they couldn't deviate from precedent. Chief Justice Allsop noted that if not for this precedent, he would have found in favour of an employment relationship.

== High Court appeal ==
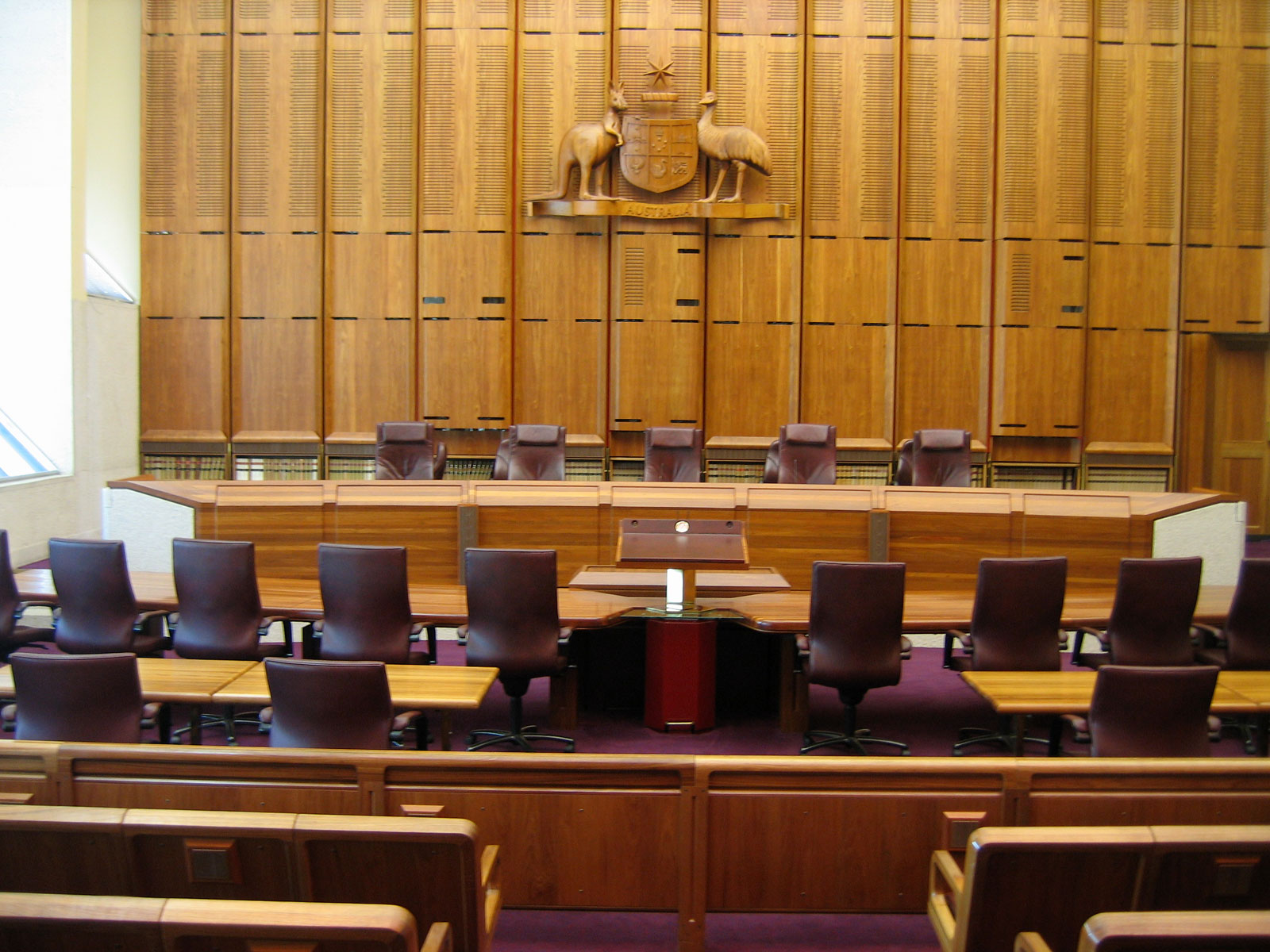
The High Court of Australia

The High Court used the dispute over McCourt's status as an opportunity to re-examine the factors that determine employment status. For decades, various courts have used a "multi-factor" test because there was no single test for determining an employment relationship. Instead, assessing the totality of circumstances to reach an overall view of the relationship was necessary. Several justices in CFMMEU v Personnel Contracting took the view that this approach was difficult and created uncertainties, though none directly challenged the test. In a 6–1 decision, the High Court allowed the appeal and found McCourt was an employee of Personnel.

In what was described as a "considerable departure", the High Court majority found the "multi-factor" test was not relevant to the facts in this case and found the relationship between the parties should in this instance be determined by the written contract. The High Court found McCourt could not have been an independent contractor because his contractual obligation to Personnel under his Administrative Services Agreement was a promise to carry out the instructions of Personnel or its client. The shift in the High Court's treatment of employment relationships meant the approach would not be to treat the construction of employment contracts like any other. Justice Simon Steward dissented, stating the appeal will "greatly damage the [business of Personnel and that] of many others".

== Impact ==
While the High Court found in favour of McCourt, the decision ultimately was expected to make existing independent contracting arrangements more secure, provided they are written clearly. Professor Andrew Stewart of the University of Adelaide observed that it "widened a loophole" and was a win for companies that use independent contractors. Stewart also opined that the decision reduced the risk for employers if contracts contained the correct language. Innes Willox of the Australian Industry Group stated the decision "will increase business certainty and investment and will consequently be good for jobs".

== Bibliography ==
Academic literature

- Crockett, Alex; Shannon, Allison (2020). "Employee v Independent Contractor: High ourt decisions of CFMMEU v Personnel Contracting and ZG v Jamsek". Employment Law Bulletin. 25 (9): 104–107 – via LexisNexis.
- Crockett, Alex; Shannon, Allison (2022). "The deep-rooted dichotomy between independent contractors and employees". Employment Law Bulletin. 27 (2): 18–23 – via LexisNexis.
- Stewart, Andrew; Murphy, Joe; Setter, Emily (2022). "Contract reigns supreme: the High Court's new approach to identifying employees". Australian Bar Review. 52: 79–98 – via LexisNexis.

Legal cases

- CFMMEU v Personnel Contracting [2019] FCA 1806, Federal Court (Australia)
- CFMMEU v Personnel Contracting [2020] FCAFC 122, Federal Court (Full Court) (Australia)
- CFMMEU v Personnel Contracting [2022] HCA 1, High Court (Australia)

News articles

- Bonyhady, Nick (20 July 2020). "'Defy common sense': Court slams below award wage contractor arrangement". The Age.
- Marin-Guzman, David (9 February 2022). "High Court backs contract jobs". Financial Review. Archived from the original on 9 February 2022.
- Ramsey, Michael (9 February 2022). "Labourer 'employee, not contractor': court". 7 News.
