= 2011 Australian federal budget =

2011 federal budget for Australia

Australian federal budget 2011–12
- Submitted: 10 May 2011
- Submitted to: Parliament of Australia
- Country: Australia
- Parliament: 43rd
- Party: Australian Labor Party
- Treasurer: Wayne Swan
- Total revenue: $350 billion
- Total expenditures: $365.8 billion
- Deficit: $20.3 billion
- Website: http://www.budget.gov.au/2011-12/ 2011–12 Commonwealth Budget

The 2011 Australian federal budget for the Australian financial year ended 30 June 2012 was presented on 10 May 2011 by the Treasurer of Australia, Wayne Swan, the fourth federal budget presented by Swan, and the first budget of the Gillard government. The budget forecast a $22.6 billion deficit and delivered a $44.4 billion deficit.

== Total receipts ==
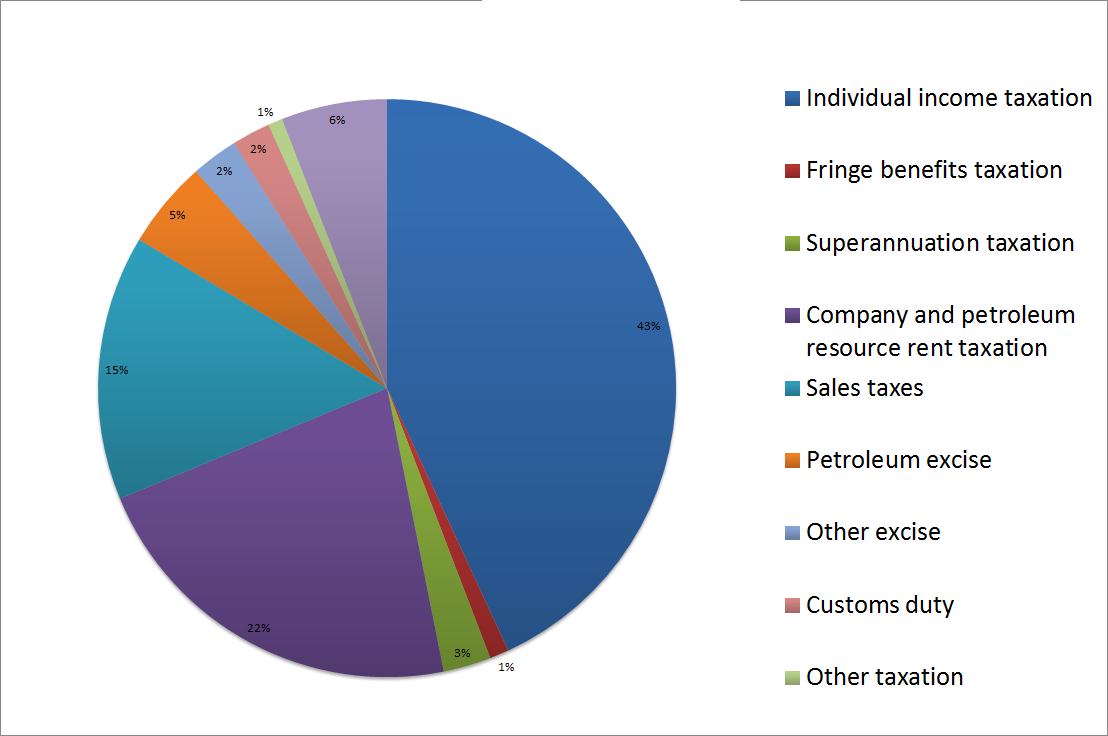
Pie graph showing revenue as reported in the 2011–12 Australian federal budget

=== Revenue summary ===
- $150,890 million – Individuals Income Tax
- $76,650 million – Company and petroleum resource rent taxation
- $51,900 million – Sales taxes
- $20,714 million – Non-tax revenue
- $17,180 million – Petroleum excise
- $9,330 million – Superannuation taxation
- $9,150 million – Other excise
- $7,520 million – Customs Duty
- $3,760 million – Fringe Benefits taxation
- $2,867 million – Other taxation

== Spending and expenditures ==
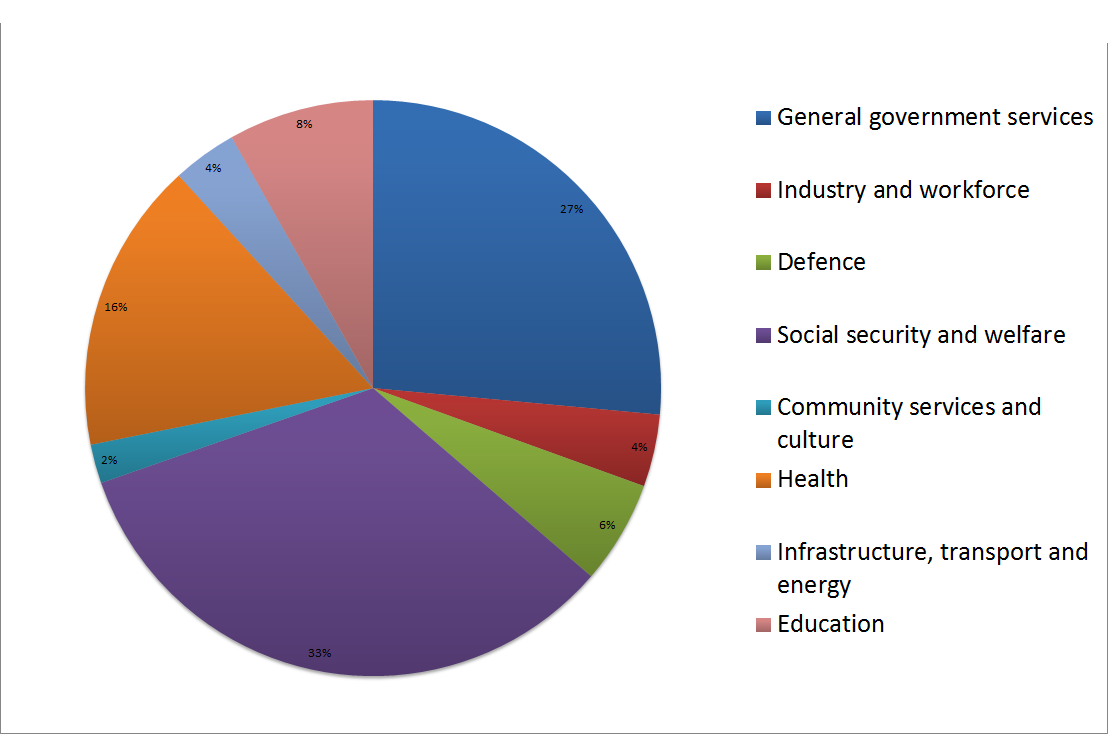
Pie graph showing expenditures in the 2011–12 Australian federal budget

Total expenses for 2011–2012 is expected to be $365.8 billion, which is an increase of 1.0% from estimated expenses as reported by the Mid-Year Economic and Fiscal Outlook 2010–2011.

=== Spending summary ===
- $121,907 million – Social Security and Welfare
- $96,797 million – General Government Services
- $59,858 million – Health
- $29,870 million – Education
- $21,277 million – Defence
- $14,843 million – Industry and Workforce
- $13,221 million – Infrastructure, Transport and Energy
- $8,044 million – Community Services and Culture

== Significant cuts ==
Many significant cuts were made by the Australian Government in the 2011–12 federal budget. The government will phase out the dependent spouse tax offset, which will save $755 million. $1.1 billion will be saved from increasing the public sector efficiency dividend, while $470 million will be saved by removing access to the Low Income Tax Offset for the unearned income of minors.

=== Welfare ===
Before the release of the federal budget, speculation was arising about crackdowns on the welfare system. On 5 May 2011, Prime Minister Gillard announced a proposal to force teenage mothers back into secondary education on or before their child turns one. If the mothers refused to return to their appropriate schooling, their social security payments would be cut. The Prime Minister defends the policy by saying that those recipients are at a lifetime of disadvantage if they do not return to school by the required time. The Gillard government's first budget has been strongly based on the changes to the welfare system. In a push to put more people in work and to lower unemployment by refining who is a worthy recipient of welfare and better targeting of family payments. This will provide savings of approximately $2 billion. Higher income earners will lose more than $5 billion in welfare benefits and concessions.

== Non-budget expenditure ==
The budget does not capture all of the spending commitments made by the Australian Commonwealth Government. Costs associated with commitments such as the National Broadband Network are dealt with separately

== See also ==
- Australian Charities and Not-For-Profits Commission
- Economy of Australia
