= Gillard government =

Australian government led by Julia Gillard (2010–2013)

Gillard government

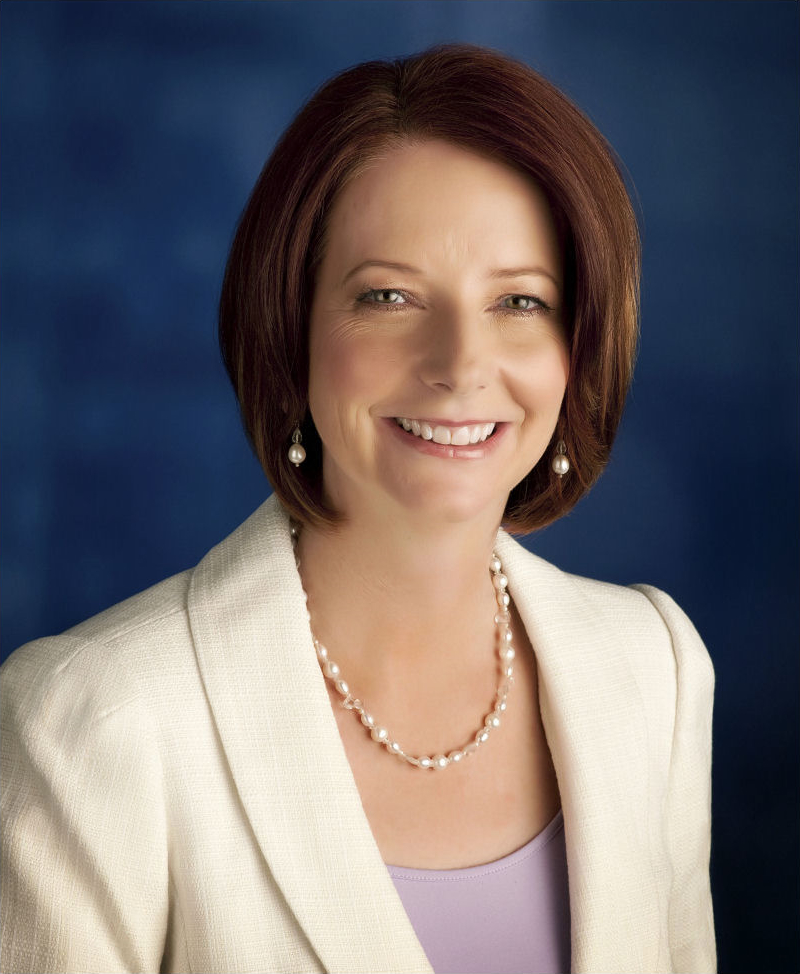

In office
- 24 June 2010 – 27 June 2013
- Monarch: Elizabeth II
- Governor-General: Dame Quentin Bryce
- Prime Minister: Julia Gillard
- Deputy: Wayne Swan
- Party: Labor
- Status: Majority (to Aug. 2010); Minority (from Aug. 2010)
- Origin: Gillard wins 2010 Labor leadership spill
- Demise: Gillard loses 2013 Labor leadership spill
- Predecessor: Rudd government (I)
- Successor: Rudd government (II)

The Gillard government was the Government of Australia led by the 27th prime minister of Australia, Julia Gillard, of the Australian Labor Party. The Gillard government succeeded the first Rudd government by way of the Labor Party leadership spill, and began on 24 June 2010, with Gillard sworn in as prime minister by the governor-general of Australia, Quentin Bryce. The Gillard government ended when Kevin Rudd won back the leadership of the Australian Labor Party on 26 June 2013 and commenced the second Rudd government.

Before mounting her successful 2010 challenge to Rudd's leadership, Gillard had served as Deputy Prime Minister in the first Rudd government. With Treasurer Wayne Swan as her Deputy, Gillard went on to lead her party to the 2010 Australian federal election against the Liberal-National Coalition led by Tony Abbott. The election resulted in a hung Parliament in which Gillard secured the support of the Australian Greens and three independents to form a government. Leadership challenges occurred intermittently between Gillard and Rudd resulting in Labor leadership spills in February 2012, March 2013 and June 2013, the last of which ended her prime ministership.

Major policy initiatives of the Gillard government included, the Clean Energy Bill 2011, asylum seeker policy, Mineral Resource Rent Tax, National Broadband Network, schools funding following the Gonski Review and the National Disability Insurance Scheme.

Management of the Labor Party's alliances with the Greens and Independents were an ongoing issue following the 2010 election. In late 2011, the government secured the defection of a Liberal member Peter Slipper to serve as Speaker of the House of Representatives. Slipper resigned as speaker in October. In early 2012 the government lost the support of independent Andrew Wilkie. In May 2012 it suspended backbencher Craig Thomson from the ALP as evidence mounted that he had defrauded the Health Services Union. The Greens ended their formal alliance with Labor in February 2013 over taxation policy, but continued to offer confidence and supply.

== Background ==
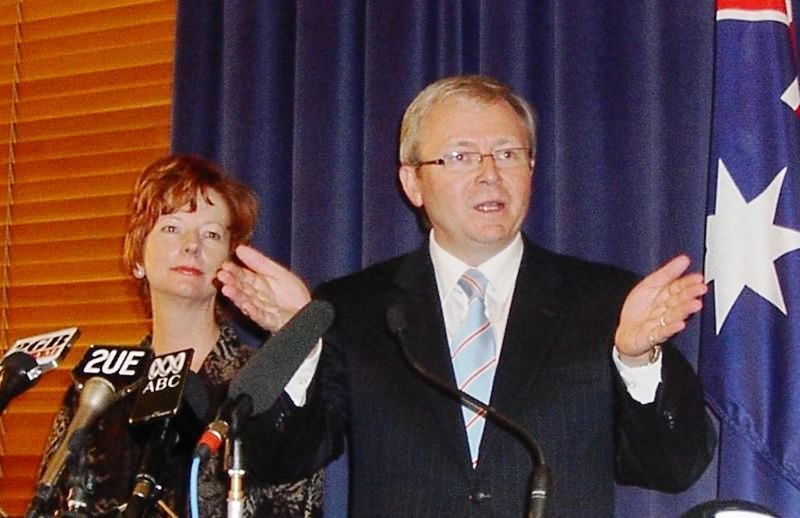
Julia Gillard with then opposition leader Kevin Rudd in 2006. Gillard became deputy prime minister after Labor won the 2007 election and later became prime minister by challenging Kevin Rudd's leadership of the Australian Labor Party in 2010.

Gillard became deputy leader of the Labor opposition during the final term of the Howard Coalition government in December 2006. The appointment came after a challenge to the leadership of Kim Beazley by Kevin Rudd. Rudd and Gillard defeated Beazley and his deputy Jenny Macklin in a caucus vote for the party leadership.

The Rudd-Gillard ticket then defeated the long-serving Howard government at the 2007 election. The first Rudd Ministry was sworn in by Governor General Michael Jeffrey on 3 December 2007, with Gillard appointed deputy prime minister. Gillard was also assigned the portfolios of Minister for Education, Minister for Employment and Workplace Relations, and Minister for Social Inclusion.

In her role as a minister, Gillard removed the WorkChoices industrial relations regime introduced by the Howard government, as well as some earlier reforms of the Hawke-Keating government, and replaced them with the Fair Work Bill. The bill established a single industrial relations bureaucracy called Fair Work Australia (FWA), in addition to the Fair Work Ombudsman (FWO), and both became operational on 1 July 2009.

In 2009, Gillard oversaw the government's "Building the Education Revolution" programme that allocated $16 billion towards the building of new school accommodation, such as classrooms, libraries and assembly halls. The programme was part of the government's economic stimulus response to the 2008 financial crisis and its expense became controversial.

== Gillard becomes Prime Minister ==
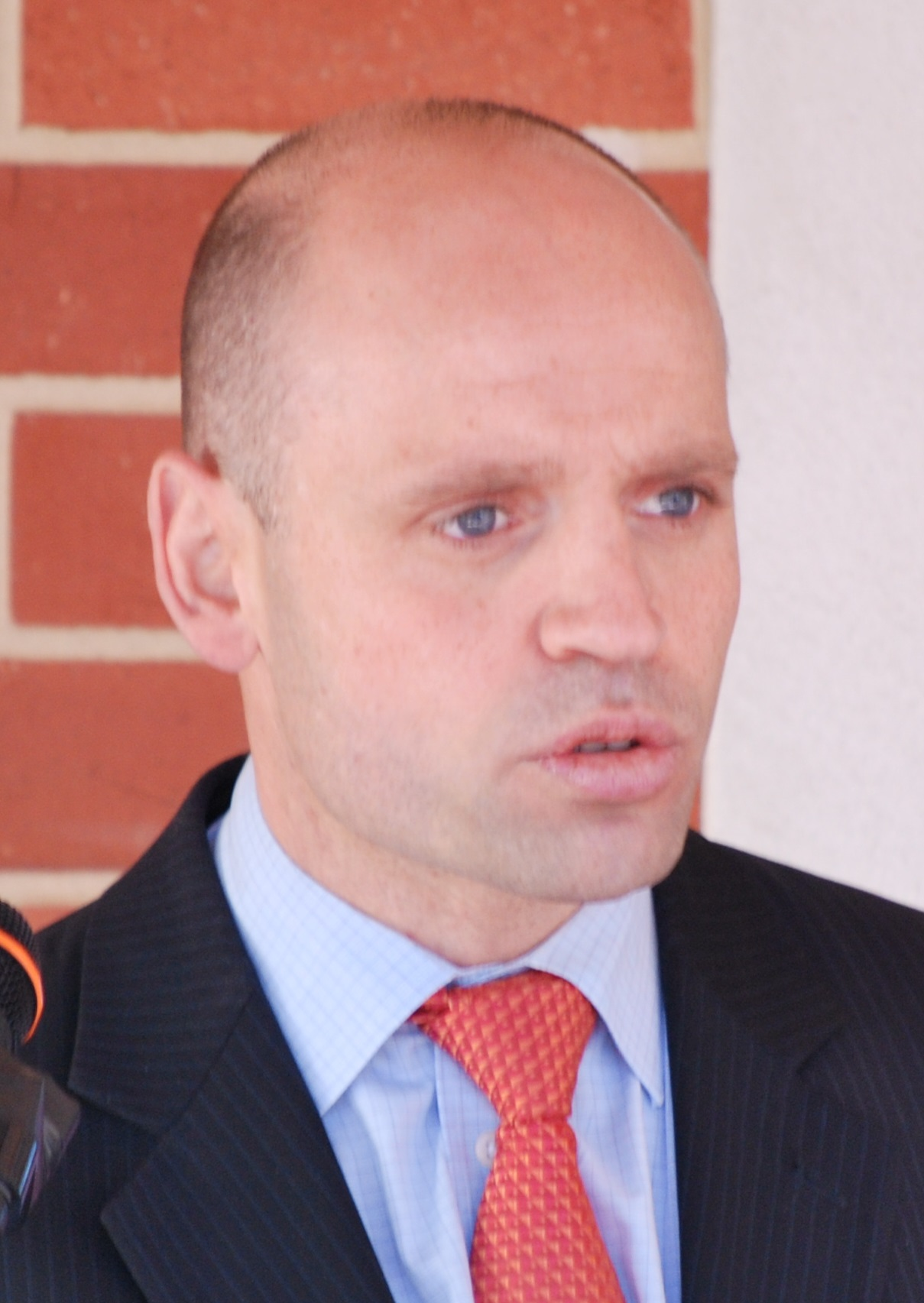
Mark Arbib of the New South Wales Right Faction.

After an initial period of popularity, by mid-2009, following the failure of the government's insulation program and amidst controversy regarding the implementation of a tax on mining, the failure of the government to secure passage of its Carbon Trading Scheme, and debate about immigration policy, significant disaffection had arisen within the Labor Party as to the leadership style and direction of Kevin Rudd. According to the ABC's 7:30 Report, the seeds for a push for Julia Gillard to challenge Rudd came from "Victorian Right factional heavyweights" Bill Shorten and Senator David Feeney, who secured the support of "New South Wales right power broker" Mark Arbib. Feeney and Arbib went to discuss the matter of leadership challenge with Gillard on the morning of 23 June and a final numbers count began for a leadership challenge.

The Sydney Morning Herald reported on 24 June that the final catalyst for this move was "sparked by a report in [the Herald of 23 June] that Mr Rudd had used his chief of staff, Alister Jordan, to sound out the backbench over the past month on the level of support for him. This followed a Herald/Nielsen poll which showed the government would lose if an election were held then" and that "Rudd's action was regarded as a sign that he did not trust the repeated assurances by Ms Gillard that she would not stand".

On 23 June 2010, Kevin Rudd called a press conference announcing that a leadership ballot of the Australian Labor Party would occur on the morning of 24 June 2010, with the candidates being himself and Deputy Prime Minister Julia Gillard. This followed weeks of speculation that senior members of the ALP were beginning to lose confidence in Rudd and would back Gillard in replacing him if necessary. By the eve of the election, it was obvious that Rudd didn't have enough support to remain ALP leader and prime minister. Rudd withdrew his candidacy and resigned as party leader, leaving Gillard to take the leadership unopposed. Gillard was then sworn in as Australia's 27th prime minister by Governor-general Quentin Bryce and became Australia's first female prime minister on 24 June 2010, with Treasurer Wayne Swan being appointed deputy prime minister.

In her first press conference as Labor Leader on 23 June, Gillard said that after three and a half years of "most loyal service", she had asked her colleagues to make a leadership change "because I believed that a good government was losing its way" and that Labor was at risk at the next election. She assured the public that her government would restore the budget to surplus in 2013 and said that it would build community consensus for a price on carbon and open negotiations with the mining industry for a re-vamped mining profits tax. She praised Kevin Rudd as a man of "remarkable achievement" and Wayne Swan as an outstanding Treasurer who would guide Australia to surplus.

In the aftermath of the leadership challenge, Bill Shorten, former trade union leader, and key Parliamentary member of the ALP Right Faction, nominated the government's handling of the insulation program; the sudden announcement of change of policy on the Carbon Pollution Reduction Scheme; and the way in which they had "introduced the debate" about the Resource Super Profits Tax as the key considerations which had led to a shift in support from Kevin Rudd to Julia Gillard as leader of the party.

== 2010 federal election ==
On 17 July 2010, 23 days after becoming prime minister and after receiving the agreement of the Governor-General Quentin Bryce, Gillard announced the next federal election for 21 August 2010. Gillard began campaigning with a speech using the slogan "moving forward". In the early stages of the campaign, a series of leaks were released by purported Labor Party sources, indicating apparent divisions within Cabinet over the replacement of Kevin Rudd by Gillard. Midway through the campaign, Gillard offered journalists a self-assessment of her campaign by saying that she had been paying too much attention to advisers in her strategy team, and she wanted to run a less "stage-managed" campaign, saying: "I think it's time for me to make sure that the real Julia is well and truly on display, so I'm going to step up and take personal charge of what we do in the campaign from this point":

Gillard met Opposition leader Tony Abbott for one official debate during the campaign. Studio audience surveys by Channel 9 and the Seven Network suggested a win to Gillard. Unable to agree on further debates, the leaders went on to appear separately on stage for questioning at community forums in Sydney and Brisbane. An audience exit poll of the Rooty Hill RSL audience indicated an Abbott victory. Gillard won the audience poll at the Broncos Leagues Club meeting in Brisbane on 18 August. Gillard also appeared on the ABC's Q&A program on 9 August. On 7 August, Gillard was questioned by former Labor leader turned Channel Nine reporter Mark Latham.

Labor's campaign was damaged by a series of leaks apparently emanating from a person or persons connected to the Rudd government's inner Cabinet circle. On 15 July, at her National Press Club address, Gillard was quizzed by Channel Nine journalist Laurie Oakes on details of her discussions with Rudd during her leadership challenge. Subsequently, it was reported that government sources said that Gillard "argued in cabinet against paid parental leave and questioned the size of a pension rise". Kevin Rudd and outgoing federal Finance Minister Lindsay Tanner denied responsibility for the leaks. On 7 August, in the first reported face-to-face meeting of the pair since the leadership change, Gillard and Rudd appeared together in Brisbane with senior campaign advisers including John Faulkner, to discuss Rudd's role in the last two weeks of the campaign. The Australian newspaper reported: "The brief footage showed no eye contact between the past and present Labor leaders as they discussed campaign tactics".

Gillard officially "launched" Labor's campaign in Brisbane five days before polling day, outlining Labor policies and using the slogan: "Yes we will move forward together".

== Minority government ==
Labor and the Coalition each won 72 seats (Note: The National Party of Western Australia is not a part of the Liberal/National Coalition. Therefore, its figures, including MP Tony Crook, are counted separately from the Coalition totals. See 2010 Australian federal election for more details.) in the 150-seat House of Representatives, four short of the requirement for majority government, resulting in the first hung parliament since the 1940 election. Both major party leaders sought to form a minority government.

Six crossbench MPs held the balance of power. Four crossbench MPs, Greens Adam Bandt and independents Andrew Wilkie, Rob Oakeshott and Tony Windsor declared their support for Labor on confidence and supply, in return for some legislative concessions, allowing Gillard and Labor to remain in power with a 76–74 minority government. Governor-General Bryce swore in the second Gillard Ministry on 14 September 2010.

=== Relations with the crossbench ===
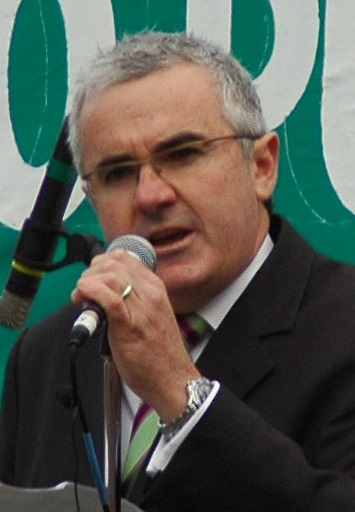
Tasmanian Independent Andrew Wilkie was one of four non-Labor members of the House of Representatives whose support secured minority government for Julia Gillard. Management of her Parliamentary majority has been a significant aspect of Gillard's prime ministership. Wilkie withdrew his support for Gillard in January 2012.

Following the August 2010 election, Julia Gillard signed a formal agreement with the Australian Greens and secured the support of three independents in relation to confidence and supply within the Australian House of Representatives, thus enabling the Gillard government to return to office as a minority government. Key to the arrangement was the ongoing support of four non-Labor members of the House of Representatives.

The Labor-Greens agreement resulted in the Greens offering to "ensure supply and oppose any motions of no-confidence in the government from other parties or MPs" in return for a range of policy undertakings from Gillard and an agreement to allow Greens leader Bob Brown and lower house MP Adam Bandt to meet with the Prime Minister each week while Parliament is sitting to work on the legislative agenda. Among the policy undertakings announced by the parties was the abandonment of the Gillard government's plan for a "citizens assembly" to discuss climate change policy and its replacement with a "climate change committee" to consider a price on carbon. That committee, chaired by Gillard, announced a carbon pricing scheme that would include a fixed price period operating as a tax. Prior to the election, Gillard had ruled out the introduction of a carbon tax while promising to put a price on carbon. This apparent breach of an election commitment proved to be one of the most controversial policy decisions of the government thus far announced. The plan secured its passage through Parliament in late 2011 as part of the Clean Energy Bill 2011. In January 2012, Greens leader Bob Brown announced a cessation of his weekly meetings with the Prime Minister following a dispute over her handling of Tasmanian forestry.

New South Wales country independents Rob Oakeshott and Tony Windsor and Tasmania independent Andrew Wilkie also reached agreement with Gillard. Oakeshott and Windsor, both estranged former members of the conservative National Party announced their support in a joint conference. Windsor cited the Labor Party's National Broadband Scheme as "critical" to securing his support along with "stability" in government. For his part Oakeshott described his decision as "line ball" and announced that he had secured an undertaking for a "taxation summit" and that Labor's broadband and climate change policies appealed to him. During negotiations, a third ex-National rural MP, Bob Katter, had operated closely with Oakeshott and Windsor, however his support fell behind Tony Abbott, as did West Australian National Tony Crook.

Andrew Wilkie also initially backed Julia Gillard as prime minister; however, her subsequent breaking of a key commitment to him regarding poker-machine reform saw Wilkie withdraw his guarantees on confidence and supply in January 2012. In November 2011, the Gillard government had its Speaker Harry Jenkins resign and installed Liberal-National defector Peter Slipper in the Chair. The manoeuvre was described as "a big win for Gillard" for boosting her numbers on the floor and on 21 January, the government was able to announce that it would not be proceeding with controversial poker machine reform promised by Gillard to independent Andrew Wilkie.

In mid-2012, dissent within the ALP organisation over the ALP-Greens coalition become public, with moves by party officials to change election preferencing arrangements with the Greens. Veteran political journalist Paul Kelly described the debate within Labor as "belated recognition that Gillard's 2010 deal with the Greens was one of the worst strategic decisions in the past 50 years of Labor history".

In February 2013, Greens leader Christine Milne announced that, while her party would continue to guarantee confidence and supply, the Greens would be ending their alliance with Labor, on the basis that the government was not taxing "big miners" enough via its MRRT mining tax.

=== Craig Thomson and Peter Slipper ===
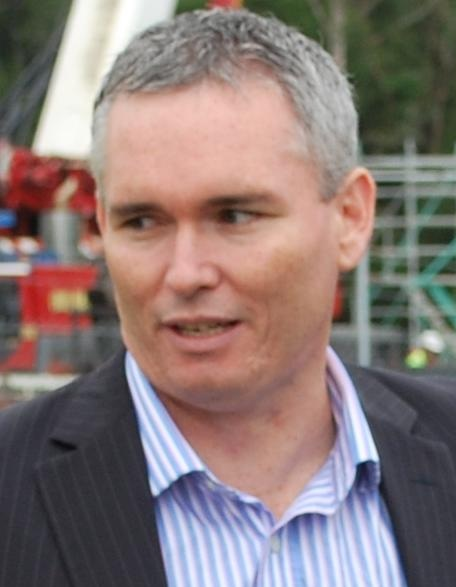
Craig Thomson was suspended from membership of the Labor Party and became a Labor-aligned independent, amidst allegations regarding his conduct as head of the Health Services Union.

The government's numbers in the House of Representatives were affected by the resignation of Peter Slipper from the Liberal National Party in order that he could serve as a Labor aligned independent and as Speaker of the House of Representatives; as well as by the eventual suspension of Labor back bencher Craig Thomson from the ALP, who was long the subject of allegations of fraudulent conduct during the Health Services Union expenses affair. Slipper ultimately resigned as Speaker for inappropriate conduct and returned to the cross bench, while police investigations were ongoing in relation to Thomson. Extensive allegations were brought before Fair Work Australia (FWA), concerning mis-use of union funds during his time as a leader of the Labor affiliated Health Services Union (HSU), prior to his entry to Parliament. Thomson pleaded not guilty to 145 charges of theft and deception relating to the alleged misuse of Union funds following the 2013 Federal Election, but was found guilty on multiple counts.

Thomson was already under investigation at the time of the 2010 Election. Under questioning from the Opposition, Gillard told Parliament on 16 August 2011, "I think he is doing a fine job representing the people of his constituency in this place... I look forward to him continuing to do that job for a very long, long, long time to come." Gillard maintained her support for Thomson as a Labor MP until late April 2012.

Presiding secretary of the HSU, Kathy Jackson, said in February 2012 that as the investigation had taken four years, she suspected the government had intervened to stall the inquiry. A by-election caused by a conviction of a member of parliament could result in the minority Gillard government losing its majority. When FWA handed down a report on the HSU alleging 181 breaches (including 76 criminal breaches) related to the union's finances to the Department of Public Prosecutions (DPP) in early April 2012, the DPP announced that it could not investigate the breaches because FWA had not provided a "Brief of Evidence". The Australian Council of Trade Unions suspended the HSU. Kathy Jackson said that it appeared that the FWA was trying to protect Thomson and the government. Gillard repeated her confidence in Thompson, while the opposition leader Tony Abbott called on Gillard to expel Thompson from her government and for the Australian Federal Police to raid FWA's offices to be able to use the contents of the report for a brief of evidence.

Civil and criminal allegations were made against Speaker Slipper in April 2012 and he announced an intention to step aside pending conclusion of the criminal investigation. The Gillard government initially resisted calls from the Opposition and Crossbenchers for Slipper to step aside for the duration of any civil investigations. On 29 April, Gillard announced that she wanted to dispel a "dark cloud" hanging over Parliament and wanted Labor MP Craig Thompson to suspend his membership of the Labor Party and for Speaker Slipper to maintain his suspension from the role of Speaker until all the completion of investigations.

Labor MP Anna Burke took up the duties of Speaker. The development left Labor with 70 seats on the floor of the House of Representatives, to the Liberals 71 – with two independents aligned to Liberal-National Coalition; Andrew Wilkie acting as a non-aligned independent; and with Slipper, Thompson, a Green and two further independents remaining Labor aligned. Soon after, West Australian National, Tony Crook announced that he would sitting and voting with the Liberal-National Coalition.

After FWA's findings against Thomson were made public (alleging that he had misused $500,000 in union funds to purchase prostitution services, as well as to aid his political campaign for Parliament and for personal cash withdrawals) the MP addressed Parliament from the crossbenches, and in an emotional speech in May 2012, claimed to be the victim of a conspiracy perpetrated by former colleagues and accused the media and opposition of seeking to "deny him his right to the presumption of innocence" and called Tony Abbott "unfit" to sit in Parliament for having pursued the matter.

Fair Work Australia launched civil action against Thompson in October 2012, alleging misuse of funds and breaches of workplace laws. A Victorian Police investigation was ongoing regarding misuse of funds by Thomson, while a New South Wales Police investigation was investigating broader allegations of fraud involving Thomson and former HSU boss Michael Williamson. Thomson was arrested on 1 February 2013, and charged with 150 counts of fraud. He was found guilty of obtaining financial advantage by using his Health Services Union (HSU) credit card to pay for sexual services and making cash withdrawals on 18 February 2014.

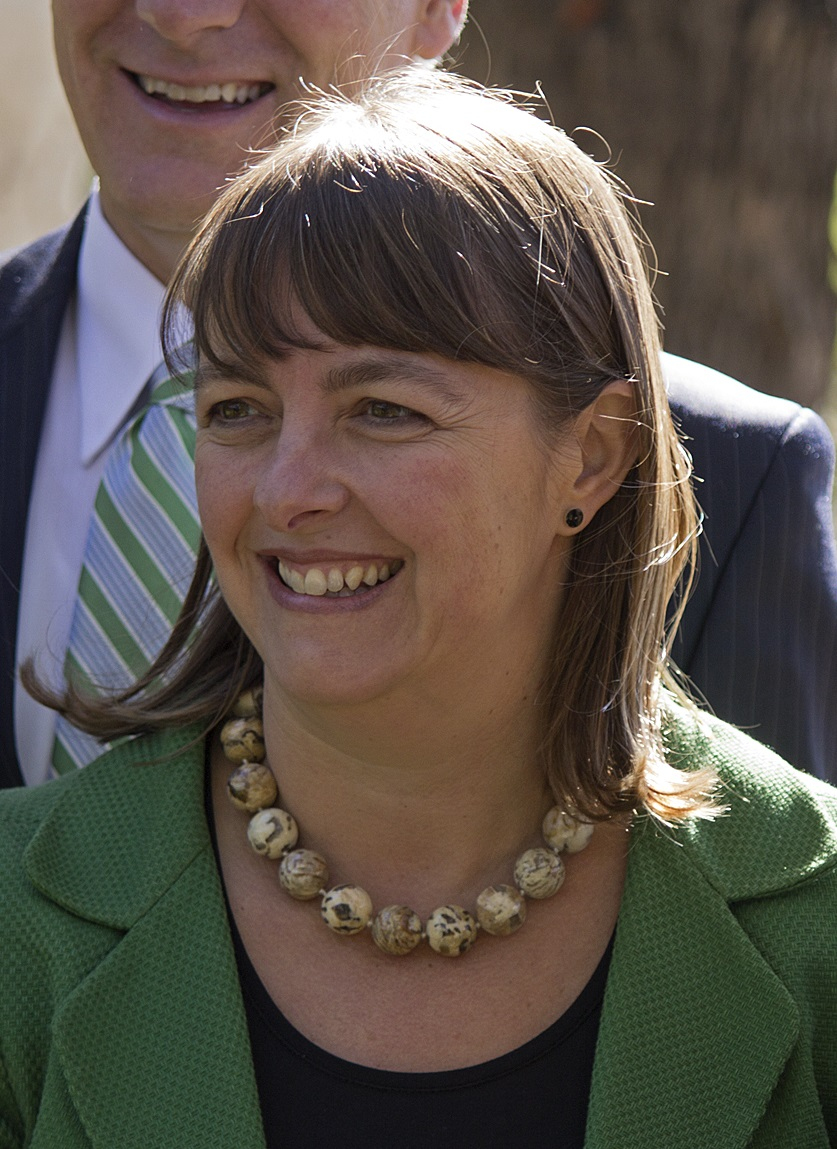
Nicola Roxon, Attorney General in the Gillard government.

=== Misogyny allegations ===
In September 2012, the Commonwealth, as first respondent in the Slipper case, agreed a settlement with Peter Slipper's staffer whereby it would pay $50,000 and improve training in relation to sexual harassment. However, the Attorney General, Nicola Roxon, repeated her claim that Slipper's staffer did not have a case. However, the case lead to release of communications used in evidence including lewd text messages sent by Slipper. The texts included denigratory remarks about female body parts and a female member of the opposition. Gillard's Attorney General, Nicola Roxon, was briefed on the texts in June, but publicly maintained that the sexual harassment claims were vexatious.

On 9 October Tony Abbott rose in parliament with a motion to have Slipper removed as Speaker over the sexist comments. Gillard refused to back the move and proceeded to link Abbott's remarks to those made in the recent Alan Jones shame controversy and said that "every day in every way" Abbott was sexist and misogynist. The Australian Greens and two independents combined to block the motion for Slipper's removal, however later that day, Peter Slipper resigned from his position of his own accord. Slipper returned to the crossbench and soon after was appointed to the Foreign Affairs, Defence and Trade committee.

The speech was criticised by some professional Australian journalists but attracted widespread interest and much positive attention in blogs and social media. Expat Chloe Angyal wrote for Britain's The Guardian that the speech tackled "sexism head-on" and was a "masterful, righteous take-down" and similar opinions were expressed by other expatriate Australian journalists. Britain's Daily Telegraph women's editor said that Gillard had cleverly shifted the focus of the news story with "an impressive set of insults". Within a week, a YouTube version of the speech had had one million hits. The context of the Labor Party's support for Peter Slipper however meant that commentary from domestic journalists was far more critical, with Michelle Grattan writing "it sounded more desperate than convincing", Peter Harthcer that Gillard "chose to defend the indefensible" and Peter van Onselen that the government had "egg on their collective faces". The public reaction was also polarised: approval ratings of Gillard and Abbott both improved following the speech.

== Leadership tensions ==
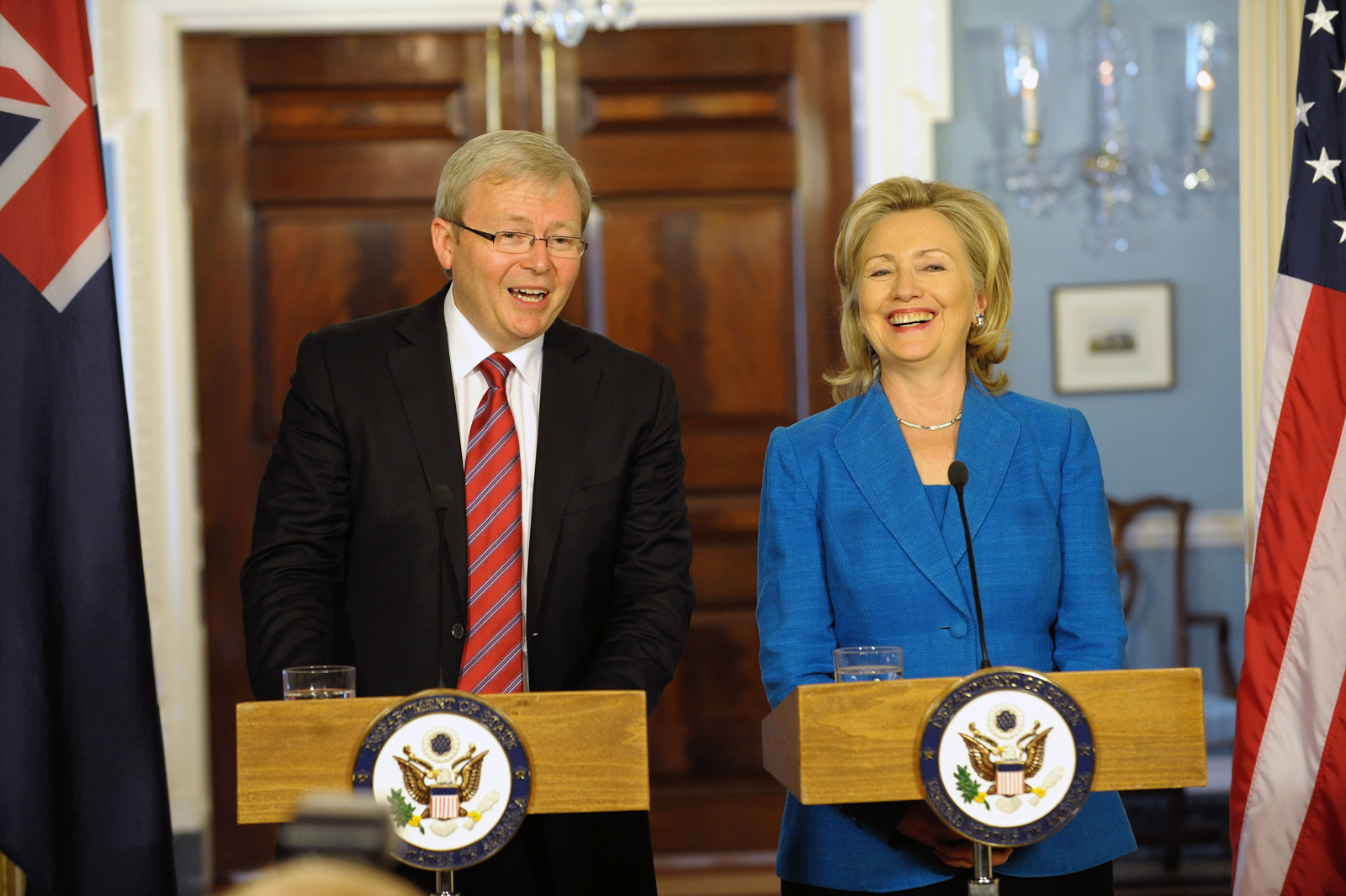
Kevin Rudd with United States Secretary of State Hillary Clinton. Gillard appointed former Labor leader Kevin Rudd as Foreign Minister in her Cabinet following the 2010 election.

Julia Gillard mounted a leadership challenge against Kevin Rudd as leader of the Australian Labor Party and Prime Minister of Australia in June 2010. Rudd remained within the government, initially as a backbencher. Following the 2010 election, Gillard appointed Rudd as foreign minister in her minority government.

The unusual circumstances of Rudd's replacement by his own party prior to completion of his first term in office, the subsequent circumstances of Labor operating without an outright Parliamentary majority, persistent two-party-preferred polling results favouring the Liberal-National opposition, and some controversial policy decisions by Julia Gillard contributed to an environment in which leadership tensions within the Labor Party were to remain a major issue.

As late as May 2010, prior to challenging Rudd, Julia Gillard was quipping to the media that "There's more chance of me becoming the full forward for the Dogs than there is of any change in the Labor Party". Consequently, Gillard's move against Rudd on 23 June appeared to surprise many Labor backbenchers. Daryl Melham when asked by a reporter on the night of the challenge if indeed a challenge was on, replied: "Complete garbage. ABC have lost all credibility." As he was being deposed, Rudd suggested that his opponents wanted to move Labor to the right, saying on 23 June: " This party and government will not be lurching to the right on the question of asylum seekers, as some have counselled us to do." Upon becoming leader, Gillard explained her actions on the basis that she believed that the Labor government had "lost its way", but did nominate asylum seeker policy, along with carbon pricing and the mining tax as priorities of her agenda.

Leadership tensions were a feature of Labor's 2010 election campaign, with a series of damaging leaks apparently emanating from people connected to the Rudd government's inner Cabinet circle.

Following the election, Rudd was returned to the front bench as Foreign Affairs Minister. Speculation as to Rudd's desire to return to the leadership of the party became a near constant feature of media commentary on the Labor Party. Minority government complicated Labor's response to the issue. In October 2011, Queensland backbencher Graham Perrett announced that if Labor replaced Gillard with Rudd, he would resign and force a by-election – a move which could cost Labor government.

At Labor's 2011 conference in Sydney, Prime Minister Gillard mentioned every Labor Prime Minister since World War Two with the exception of Kevin Rudd. The speech was widely reported as a "snub" to Rudd.

Amdist ongoing poor two-party preferred polling results for the government, and following the loss of Independent MP Andrew Wilkie's support on the floor of the Parliament, and an Australia Day security scare in which Gillard's office had been implicated in "tipping off" a rowdy protest emanating from the Aboriginal Tent Embassy in Canberra, senior Labor figures were openly discussing the question of Rudd's desire to lead the party in the media. Simon Crean told radio 3AW: "[Rudd] can't be leader again... People will not elect as leaders those they don't perceive as team players". Treasurer Swan told ABC TV in February that "Sure, there's one or two individuals out there who are disgruntled, they are feeding some of these stories" but that the majority of caucus supported Gillard. The Greens leader Bob Brown also continued to support Gillard, telling journalists in February that ongoing criticism of her was "sexist and unfair".

Gillard's appearance on ABCTV's Four Corners in mid-February ignited a further storm of leadership speculation in the Labor Party and the national media, and cast doubt on Gillard's insistence that she had not actively sought the leadership of the ALP prior to her challenge to Rudd in 2010. A day later ABC TV's 7:30 revealed that the Unionist sent by Gillard's media office to advise Aboriginal Tent Embassy protesters of Abbott's location prior to the Australia Day security scare had both misrepresented Abbott's own remarks regarding the Tent Embassy and repeatedly denied she had done so in subsequent interviews. A breakdown in party discipline followed in the aftermath of these programs which, saw Labor MP Darren Cheeseman call on Gillard to resign, while his colleague Steve Gibbons called Rudd a "psychopath with a giant ego". Amidst the controversy, an expletive laden video of out-takes of an intemperate Kevin Rudd attempting to record a Chinese language message during his time as prime minister was released anonymously on YouTube, apparently aimed at discrediting his push for the leadership. While Rudd said publicly only that he was "happy as foreign minister", media commentators widely declared that a leadership challenge was "on" and Independent MP Andrew Wilkie told journalists that Rudd had met with him in November and discussed the leadership issue.

=== 2012 leadership spill ===
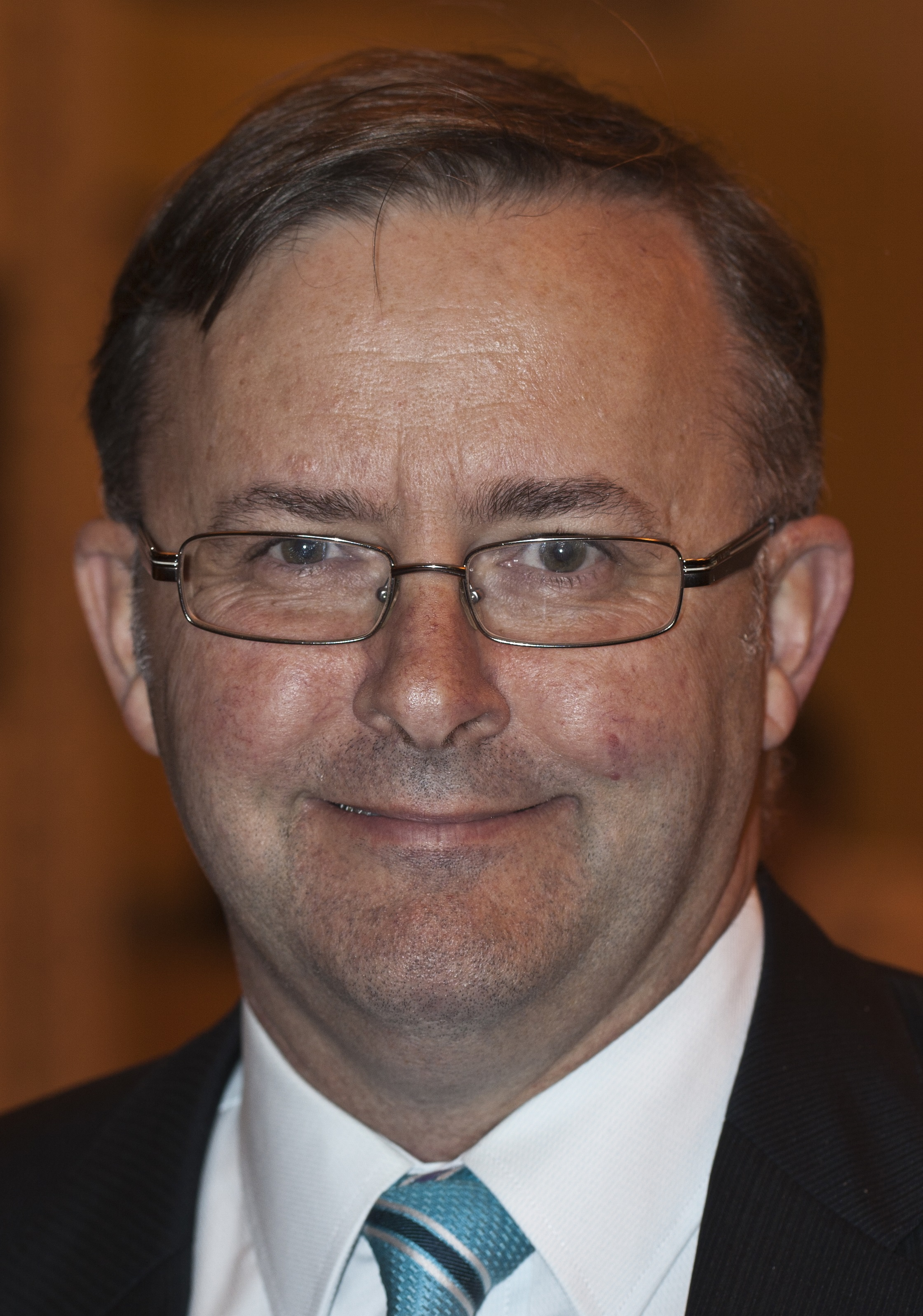
Leader of the House Anthony Albanese was the most senior Labor figure to support Kevin Rudd's bid for a return to the Labor leadership. In a tearful address he called on colleagues to stop publicly attacking each other.

Rudd announced his resignation as foreign minister on 22 February, citing a lack of support from Julia Gillard and character attacks launched by Simon Crean and "a number of other faceless men" as the catalyst for his resignation. Prime Minister Gillard called a leadership ballot for 27 February. In doing so, she attempted to see off a "two-stage" strategy by declaring she would return to the backbenches and renounce any future leadership bid, and asking Rudd to do the same. She also expanded upon the reasons for her original challenge of Rudd's leadership, saying that his government had entered a period of "paralysis" and that Rudd was operating along "difficult and chaotic work patterns".

In their initial responses to the announcement, senior ministers launched stinging attacks on Rudd's legacy as Prime Minister. Deputy Prime Minister Wayne Swan lambasted Rudd as "dysfunctional"; cabinet colleague Tony Burke said of Rudd's term in office that "the stories that were around of the chaos, of the temperament, of the inability to have decisions made, they are not stories"; Nicola Roxon declared she could not work with Rudd again; Stephen Conroy said that Rudd had had "contempt" for his colleagues, the Parliament and the public. Ministers Tanya Plibersek and Stephen Smith were more circumspect, but supported Gillard. Labor Senator Doug Cameron and Immigration Minister Chris Bowen came out in support of Rudd and called on their colleagues to show him respect. Labor Ministers Robert McClelland and Martin Ferguson also declared for Rudd, saying Gillard could not win against Tony Abbott. In an emotional address, Minister Anthony Albanese announced that he had offered his resignation as Leader of the House of Representatives and would be supporting Rudd because he believed the manner in which he had been replaced in 2010 was wrong. Prime Minister Gillard refused to accept Albanese's resignation.

Gillard portrayed Rudd as a "chaotic" manager and would-be celebrity who led a "paralysed" government. Rudd portrayed Gillard as untrustworthy and unable to win an election. Rudd nominated Gillard's actions in relation to her promise not to implement a carbon tax; her East Timor and Malaysia Solution plans for asylum seekers; her written agreement with Andrew Wilkie on poker reforms and twelve months of low polling as key failings of Gillard's time in office.

Gillard defeated Rudd in the leadership ballot by 71 votes to 31. Rudd returned to the backbench and promised loyalty to Gillard till the next election. His strategist Bruce Hawker left open the possibility of Rudd being drafted back by the party if Gillard's polling did not improve.

Following the vote, Senator Mark Arbib, a factional leader and key backer of Gillard in the 2010 replacement of Rudd announced that he would be resigning as a minister and senator to assist the party to "heal" in the wake of the leadership dispute. Gillard described the events leading up to the ballot as "ugly" but said that the leadership issue was now "determined". Following a further series of leaks, it was confirmed that former New South Wales Premier Bob Carr would replace the retiring Arbib as a Senator representing New South Wales and the ousted Rudd as Minister for Foreign Affairs.

=== March 2013 leadership spill ===
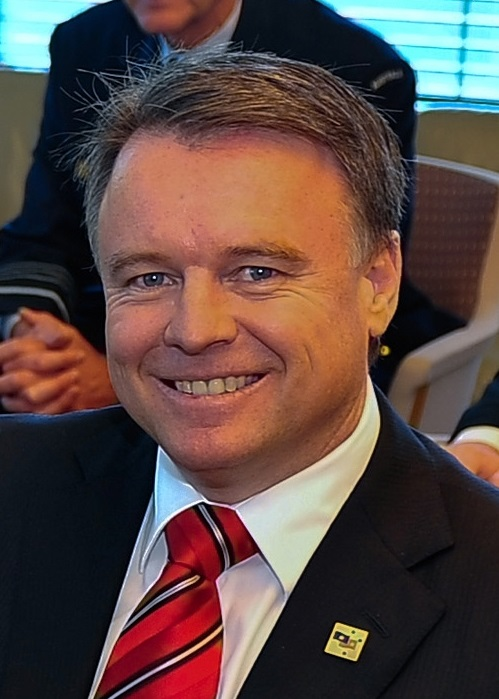
Joel Fitzgibbon was chief government whip at the time of the 2013 Leadership Spill. Following Rudd's decision not to contest, Fitzgibbon resigned from his post, along with other Rudd supporters.

Leadership tension continued within the Gillard government between the 2012 Labor leadership spill and 2013. According to Fairfax political editor Peter Hartcher, "After more than 2½ years of being consistently in a losing position in the ACNielsen poll, the great bulk of Labor MPs did not believe the government could win the election that Gillard had called for September 14."

In interviews, Rudd told media he would not challenge Gillard, while he and his supporters reportedly continued to campaign privately for his return to the leadership.

In March 2013, after sustained poor polling and criticism of the government's handling of Communications Minister Stephen Conroy's proposals for media law reform (called "shambolic" by a key crossbencher), Labor Party Whip Joel Fitzgibbon confirmed that Labor members were "looking at the polls and they're expressing concern". On 21 March, Simon Crean called for a spill of all leadership positions and announced that he would support Kevin Rudd for leader and would himself stand for the deputy leadership. Gillard called a leadership spill for 4.30 pm that afternoon. Just 10 minutes prior to the scheduled ballot, Rudd told reporters that he would not stand:

I have also said that the only circumstances under which I would consider a return to leadership would be if there was an overwhelming majority of the parliamentary party requesting such a return, drafting me to return and the position was vacant [...] I am here to inform you that those circumstances do not exist.

Crean was sacked from the ministry, chief government whip and key Rudd supporter Fitzgibbon resigned his post, as did two other government whips, Ed Husic and Janelle Saffin and Parliamentary Secretary for the Pacific Islands, Richard Marles. Ministers Chris Bowen, Kim Carr, and Martin Ferguson resigned the following day.

=== June 2013 leadership spill ===
On 26 June 2013, Gillard called another leadership spill in the face of mounting speculation about Rudd's intentions. Rudd won the ballot 57–45, and was sworn in as Prime Minister the following day. Following the result, Gillard announced:

In accordance with the pledge I gave earlier today I announce that I will not recontest the federal electorate of Lalor at the forthcoming election. I will have time in the coming weeks to be back home in my electorate to say hello and goodbye to the community that I've had the absolute privilege of representing in this Parliament since 1998.

== Policies ==
=== Environment ===
==== Climate change ====
In her 2010 election campaign, Gillard pledged to build a "national consensus" for a carbon price by creating a "citizens assembly", to examine "the evidence on climate change, the case for action and the possible consequences of introducing a market-based approach to limiting and reducing carbon emissions", over the course of one year. The assembly was to be selected by an independent authority who would select people from the electoral roll using census data. The plan was never implemented. After the 2010 election, Gillard agreed to form a minority government with the Greens and replaced her "citizens assembly" plan with a climate change panel.

During the 2010 campaign, Gillard also promised a $2,000 rebate for people to update pre-1995 motor vehicles. Costed at $400 million, the government said it would remove heavy polluting cars from circulation. After a delay, the Cleaner Car rebate, also known as the Cash for Clunkers scheme, was introduced. Following the 2010–11 Queensland floods the government cut the program, announcing the move as part of savings for a diversion of funds to help with flood relief. In all the government announced $1.6 billion in cuts to climate initiatives, including cuts to the solar energy rebate and carbon capture research.

==== Carbon price ====
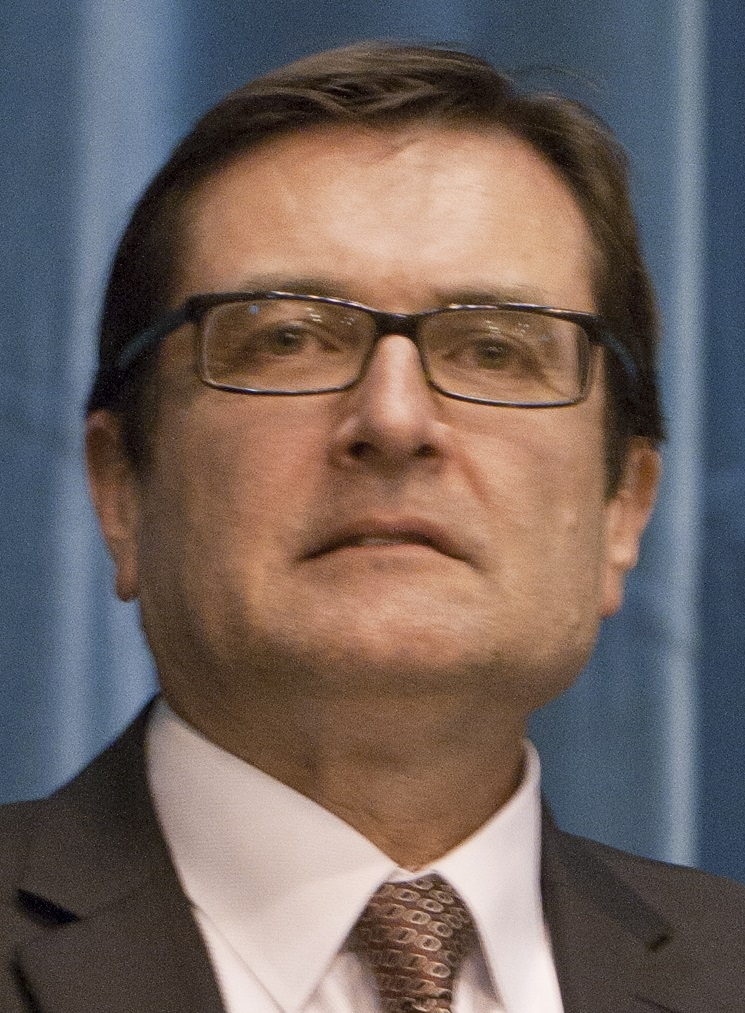
Greg Combet was appointed Minister for Climate Change and Energy Efficiency in the second Gillard Ministry.

Both the incumbent Howard government and the Rudd Labor opposition promised to implement an emissions trading scheme (ETS) before the 2007 federal election. Labor won the election, and the Rudd government began negotiating the passage of an ETS through the Parliament. The Coalition called for the vote on the government's ETS to be delayed until after the United Nations climate change summit in Copenhagen in December 2009. Prime Minister Rudd said in response that it would be "an act of absolute political cowardice, an absolute failure of leadership not to act on climate change until other nations had done so" and the government pursued the early introduction of the Scheme. Unable to secure the support of the Australian Greens for their preferred model, the government entered negotiations with the Malcolm Turnbull led Liberal opposition, and in the lead up to the Copenhagen Conference, developed an amended Carbon Pollution Reduction Scheme, with the support of Turnbull. Following a party revolt by Coalition members opposed to the Scheme, and shortly before the carbon vote, Tony Abbott challenged for the leadership of the Liberal Party and narrowly defeated Turnbull. Thereafter the Coalition opposed the ETS outright and the government was unable to secure the support of other senators for its CPRS.

Following the Copenhagen Conference, Prime Minister Rudd announced the deferral of the Scheme and elected not to take the matter to a double dissolution election.

Gillard subsequently defeated Rudd in a leadership challenge and in the lead up to the 2010 election, Prime Minister Gillard and Treasurer Swan gave assurances that no carbon tax would be introduced by a Gillard led government, but that a "citizens' assembly" would be called to sound out public support for a price on carbon.

The 2010 election resulted in a hung parliament in which Gillard secured the support of the Greens and three independents to form a government. On 28 September, in a joint press conference with the Greens, Gillard announced that a citizens assembly would not be held and that instead a "multi-party climate change committee" consisting of Labor, Greens and Independent members, would examine the issues. On 24 February 2010, in a joint press conference of the "Climate Change Committee" Gillard announced a plan to legislate for the introduction of a fixed price to be imposed on "carbon pollution" from 1 July 2012 The carbon tax would be placed for three to five years before a full emissions trading scheme is implemented, under a blueprint agreed by a multi-party parliamentary committee.

The government proposed the Clean Energy Bill in February 2011, which the opposition claimed to be a broken election promise. The Liberal Party vowed to overturn the bill if it is elected.

The legislation was approved by the Lower House in October 2011 and by the Upper House in November 2011.

=== Tasmanian forest deal ===
A$274 million government package ending the logging of native forests was agreed on with the Tasmanian government, which has full backing of industry, but criticised by the Greens.

=== Communication ===
==== National Broadband Network ====
Continuing Rudd's promise in 2007, the construction of the National Broadband Network is ongoing. In November 2010, the first major implementation of the construction was when senators, voted 30 to 28, to separate the retail and commercial arms of former state monopoly Telstra, to increase competition as its infrastructure is incorporated in the new network. In February 2011, the NBN rollout came closer with a commercial agreement, which paved the way for the NBN Co to use Telstra's assets and for Telstra to phase out its copper network.

The network was tested in several locations in Tasmania and then in May 2011, the network was launched on the mainland in Armidale, New South Wales, the first of five sites on the mainland.

==== Internet controls ====
Soon after Gillard first took over from Kevin Rudd as prime minister, she put herself on record as being in favour of a mandatory internet filter for Australia and justified her stance by saying images of child abuse and child pornography should not be legally available on the internet.

==== Transition to digital television ====
The Gillard government continued the national transition from analogue to digital television, which was launched in 2008 by Minister Stephen Conroy. The government ran the "Get Ready for Digital TV" campaign, which encouraged Australians to buy either a Set-top box or a digital television. The transition was completed on 9 December 2013, when the final analogue transmissions were switched off.

=== Economy ===
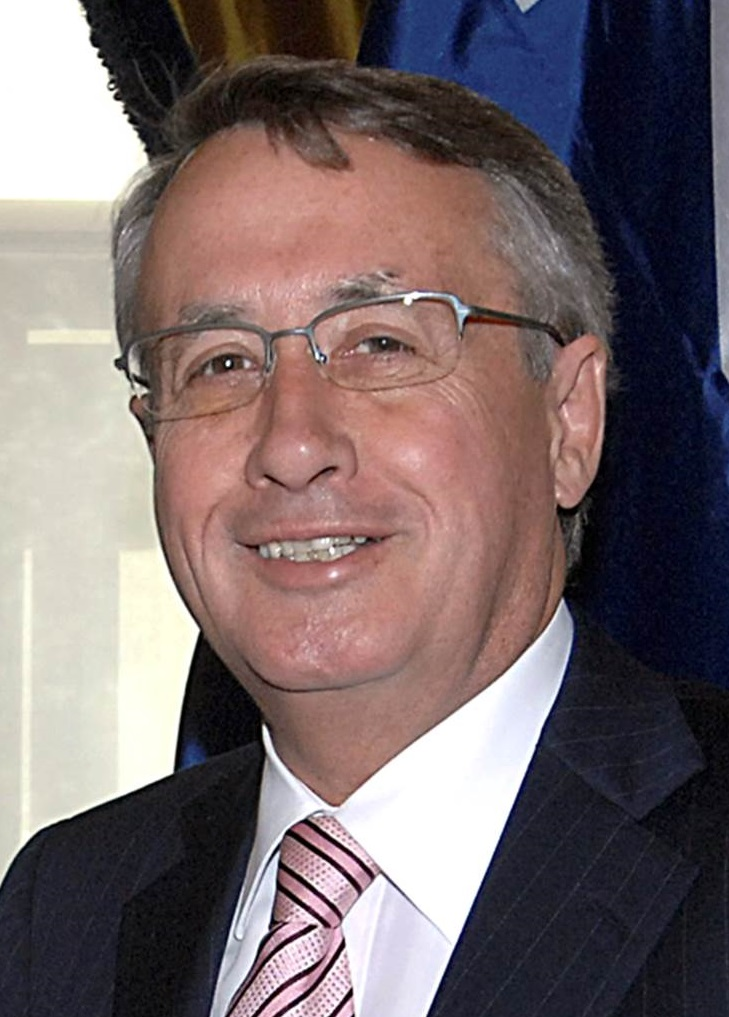
Wayne Swan, Deputy Prime Minister and Treasurer.

==== Fiscal policy ====
Upon taking over as Leader of the ALP on 23 June 2010, in one of her first policy undertakings in her first press conference, Gillard said she could "assure" Australians that the Federal Budget would be in surplus in 2013. The government continued to promise this outcome until December 2012.

Prior to the 2010 Election, and through the first two years of its second term, the Gillard government gave a series of guarantees that it would return the Federal Budget to surplus for the 2012–13 financial years. Gillard said that there were "no ifs no buts" about this promise and that "failure is not an option here and we won't fail". In his May 2011 Budget, Wayne Swan projected a $22.6 billion deficit and delivered a $44.4 billion deficit. In his 2012–13 Budget Swan announced that the government would deliver a $1.5 billion surplus. The government continued to predict a surplus until the close of 2012, but during the 2012 Christmas break, Treasurer Swan, as acting-prime-minister, announced that the government no longer expected to obtain a surplus, citing falling revenue and global economic conditions.

As part of minority government formation negotiations, Gillard also agreed to establish an independent Parliamentary Budget Office.

==== Mining tax ====
In the final months of the Rudd government, Kevin Rudd and Wayne Swan pursued a proposal to initiate a Resource Super Profit Tax on certain mining companies. The RSPT was to be levied at 40% and applied to all extractive industry including gold, nickel and uranium mining as well as sand and quarrying activities. The Rudd/Swan tax proposal was strongly opposed by the mining sector and by the Tony Abbott led Opposition, leading the Rudd government to instigate an advertising campaign to increase public support for the tax. In the aftermath of the 2010 leadership challenge, which saw Gillard replace Rudd, Bill Shorten, a key Parliamentary member of the ALP Right Faction, nominated the government's handling of the way in which Rudd had "introduced the debate" about the Resource Super Profits Tax as one of the main considerations which had led to a shift in support from Kevin Rudd to Julia Gillard as leader of the party.

After becoming Prime Minister, Gillard cancelled the Rudd government's controversial $40 million advertising campaign supporting its mining super profits tax and called on miners to withdraw their own media campaign against the tax. Gillard pledged to re-negotiate the tax proposal and a revised Minerals Resource Rent Tax was approved by the House of Representatives on 24 November 2011, with the government announcing that a 30 per cent tax would start on 1 July 2012 and would be expected to generate about $12 billion to 2013/14. The government said that it would allocate funds raised towards a company tax rate cut, infrastructure and an increase in the superannuation guarantee rate from nine to 12 per cent.

The 2012–13 Budget set aside the proceeds of the new tax to fund family payments, a bonus for school-aged children and small business tax breaks. However, rather than generating revenue, in the first quarter the new tax incurred a tax credit liability for the government, as mining companies had no tax payable under the MRRT calculation, but could credit their state government royalty payments against future MRRT liabilities. The federal government must pay 10% compound interest on MRRT tax credits. In February 2013, Treasurer Swan announced that the new tax had raised $126 million during its first six months. The government had originally budgeted for the MRRT to raise $3 billion through the 2012–13 financial year.

==== Relations with mining companies ====
In 2012, Gillard and Treasurer Swan made a number of public criticisms of mining company bosses. Swan singled out Gina Rinehart, Andrew Forrest and Clive Palmer and accused them of using their wealth and position to try to undermine public policy. Swan and Gillard repeated such criticisms in Parliament and in various media outlets. When Gillard suggested in May 2012 that people who lived on Sydney's North Shore were not "real people", the Opposition and media commentators accused the government of pursuing "class warfare".

In May, ministers in the Gillard government re-stated government approval for mining magnate Gina Rinehart to bring in 1700 skilled foreign workers to get her $9.5 billion Roy Hill iron ore mine underway in the Pilbara. The move drew criticism from some trade unionists and some Labor MPs. Union leader Paul Howes "I mean I thought we were actually attacking these guys at the moment. Whose side are we on?" Prime Minister Gillard said that she had not had full knowledge of negotiations.

==== Flood levy ====
After the devastating flood that caused widespread damage to Queensland, Gillard proposed a temporary levy that would raise $1.8 billion and take effect from 1 July 2011. The levy would help pay for the reconstruction of roads, rail and bridges in areas damaged by the recent floods. With a minority government, she needed four of the six lower house crossbenchers and all of the crossbench senators, with lower house members, Tony Crook, Bob Katter, Andrew Wilkie and Adam Bandt, supporting the levy. In the Senate, all the cross benchers (Green senators, Steve Fielding and Nick Xenophon) supported the flood levy and passed. In a February Newspoll, it showed that 55 per cent supported the new flood levy.

==== Live cattle exports ====
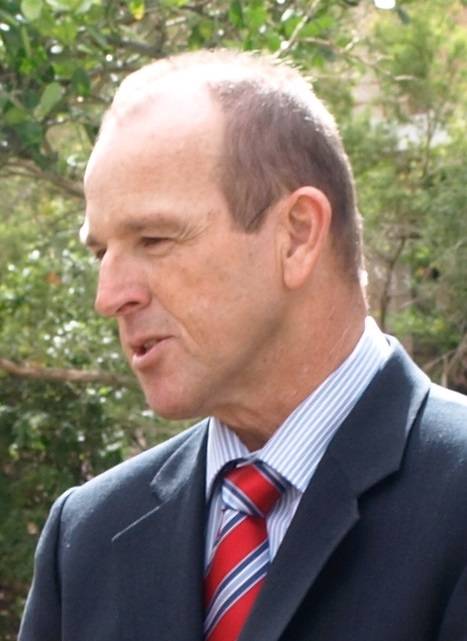
Joe Ludwig, Minister for Agriculture, Fisheries and Forestry.

In response to a television program which showed footage of mis-treatment of Australian sourced cattle at certain Indonesian abattoirs, in June 2011, Agriculture Minister Joe Ludwig announced the suspension of Australia's live cattle export trade to Indonesia, pending an examination of animal welfare considerations. Indonesia threatened to challenge the Gillard government's ban at the World Trade Organization. Live cattle exports were banned for two months and new guidelines introduced. While animal welfare campaigners called for the ban to remain permanent, the agricultural sector in Northern Australia suffered significant loss of earnings and the 2012 Federal Budget confirmed that a potential class action had been communicated to the government from livestock producers and related industries, seeking compensation for loss of trade.

=== Education ===
Education was a priority on Gillard's agenda, following the launch of the My School website while she was Education minister. The revamped version was published in March 2011.

==== Gonski Report ====
The Gonski Report, named after its chairman David Gonski, was commissioned in April 2010, by Julia Gillard, then education minister in the Rudd government. Its findings were presented to the Federal government in November 2011. Following the submission of the report, both Federal and state governments proceeded to consider its content. It was released to the public in February 2012. In April 2013, the Council of Australian Governments (COAG) discussed an A$9.4 billion school funding plan, based on the findings and recommendations of the Gonski report. Gillard then sought support from the state governments for her National Education Reform Agreement, and the New South Wales Government under Premier Barry O'Farrell agreed to sign up, announced on 23 April 2013.

To fund the National Education Reform Agreement, the Gillard government announced funding cuts to higher education that would also affect tertiary students, as another A$520 million would be raised by capping tax deductions for self-education expenses. In early May 2013, News Limited gained access to confidential documents related to the "Better Schools for all Australians" advertising campaign that was designed to promote the Gonski school reforms, and published a story about how the campaign would use free-to-air and pay television, social media sites, magazines, and newspapers, with the allocation of a A$50 million budget on this marketing.

The report recommended use of model based on need, redirecting funds from over-funded schools that were not in need. Its key recommendation was the Schooling Resource Standard (SRS), which is a base rate of funding per student determined on various factors, meaning additional loading for disadvantage factors, such as a high proportion of Indigenous students. Gonski said the system would "ensure that differences in educational outcomes are not the result of differences in wealth, income, power or possessions". The SRS is used to calculate what every school needs to have 80 per cent of its students reaching minimum NAPLAN goals.

As of 21 May 2013, the Government of South Australia continued to negotiate its participation in regard to the National Education Reform Agreement, but Premier Jay Weatherill expressed his support for the Gonski model, saying that his government would sign on to the agreement once they were certain that it was a good deal for the state.

The Independent Schools Council of Australia and the National Catholic Education Commission continued to question the Gonski proposal and sought to undermine Gillard's goal of securing agreements with all Australian states and the two chief ministers by 30 June 2013.

In late May 2013, senior government sources expected the Labor-led state governments of Tasmania, South Australia, and the Australian Capital Territory to join Gillard's school funding reform proposal, and Gillard was expected to employ the momentum that is generated by their support to apply pressure on the Queensland and Victorian governments.

After the September 2013 federal election, when the Liberal-National Coalition Abbott government replaced the Labor party, the Gonski report was removed from the government's website. It was preserved by Australia's Pandora Archive. by that time, four states (NSW, SA, Tasmania, and Victoria) and the ACT had signed up to the funding reforms, which would be honoured by the new federal government; however, it only committed to delivering four years of funding, and refused to commit to delivering the Gonski funding to public schools in Queensland, Western Australia, and the Northern Territory.

In 2017 the Turnbull government commissioned Gonski to chair a second panel, called the Review to Achieve Educational Excellence in Australian Schools, to examine evidence and make recommendations on how school funding should be used to improve school performance and student outcomes. This report, referred to as Gonski 2.0, was published on 30 April 2018. The Turnbull government passed needs-based education funding legislation based on the SRS model in 2017, but did not expect the goal to be achieved for at least ten years.

The 10-year anniversary of the Gonski report in May 2022 led to criticism of successive state governments failure to implement its recommendations. In January 2025 South Australia and Victoria signed on to the new school funding agreement with the federal government under Anthony Albanese (after the previous agreement had expired in 2024), which lifts federal funding of public schools to 25 per cent from 20 per cent, under the Better and Fairer Schools Agreement (BFSA). NSW signed up in early March, and Queensland was the last state to make the commitment, on 24 March 2025. Under the BFSA, states are required to increase their funding of public schools to 75 per cent of the minimum amount recommended by the 2012 Gonski Review and Gonski 2.0 per the SRS. This means that they will be "fully funded" according to the Gonski model.

==== National School Chaplaincy Programme ====
On 7 September 2011, Peter Garrett, Education Minister in the Gillard government, announced a number of changes in the National School Chaplaincy Programme, renamed to the National School Chaplaincy and Student Welfare Programme. New chaplains were to be required to have a "Certificate IV in Youth Work, Pastoral Care or an equivalent qualification", while previously no formal qualifications were required. The changes also offered schools the option to employ, instead of "a religious support worker" (chaplain), a "secular student well-being officer", following concerns over the appropriateness of having a religious worker in a public school. Previously schools were only able to hire a secular welfare worker under the programme if they could demonstrate that their efforts to find an ordained chaplain had failed. On 27 September 2013 there were 2,339 chaplains and 512 student welfare workers employed under NSCP.

=== Health ===
In 2010, a hospital funding scheme was drawn up by the Rudd government, where all states and territories, except Western Australia, under Liberal control, agreed to give up control of a third of their GST. In November 2010, the new Liberal government in Victoria joined Western Australia in rejecting the deal and Gillard said the old reforms would not work. Gillard revamped the health reform package, by providing the states with $16.4 billion from July 2014 to 2020. It scrapped a major element of the previous package which would reduce 60 per cent of the states recurrent health costs to 50 per cent and removed the former Rudd government plans to fund 60 per cent of new hospital capital costs. The deal was agreed on by all state premiers and chief ministers in February 2011.

In March 2012, Labor secured the support of the Australian Greens and Independent Rob Oakeshott to legislate for the introduction of a means test for the private health insurance rebate subsidy. The move was predicted to inject $746.3 million towards the government's planned budget surplus. It was criticised by health insurers as likely to encourage privately insured members to return to the public health system. Prior to the election of the Rudd government, the Labor Party had pledged not to adjust the rebate.

==== Plain cigarette packaging ====
Plain cigarette packaging laws, which were introduced by Health Minister Nicola Roxon, passed Parliament on 21 November 2011. They banned the use of company logos and require all cigarette packets to be a dark green colour.

==== National Disability Insurance Scheme (NDIS) ====
The NDIS was introduced by the Gillard Labor government on 1 July 2013, beginning with a trial phase known as the NDIS Launch. The NDIS began to be introduced across Australia from July 2016.

=== Paid Parental Leave scheme ===
The scheme was passed under the Rudd government in June 2010 and came into effect under Gillard on 1 January 2011, which paid $570 a week. According to figures released by Families Minister Jenny Macklin, 15,450 (as of 30 January 2011) have applied. There were claims when Gillard was the Deputy Prime Minister, she questioned and opposed the scheme, which she denied.

=== Immigration ===
Chris Bowen succeeded Chris Evans to serve as Labor's Minister for Immigration and Citizenship in the Gillard government. Broadly, the Gillard government maintained Australia's long-term bi-partisan policy of a large, multi-ethnic annual immigration program. Gillard sought to rhetorically re-position the Labor government away from Kevin Rudd's "Big Australia" population goal. Gillard also identified the Labor government's handling of asylum seeker policy under Kevin Rudd as a policy area requiring improvement.

In response to growing numbers of boat arrivals and deaths at sea, the Gillard government revised Labor's position on asylum seeker policy and adopted support for offshore processing. It elected not to re-open offshore processing centres established under the Howard government, and instead sought other arrangements in the region—notably through the announcement of a limited people-exchange arrangement with Malaysia. The Malaysian proposal involved Australia sending 800 asylum seekers to Malaysia in exchange for 4000 processed refugees. However, the plan was blocked by the High Court and the government later acted to re-open the Pacific Solution processing centres.

==== Asylum seekers ====
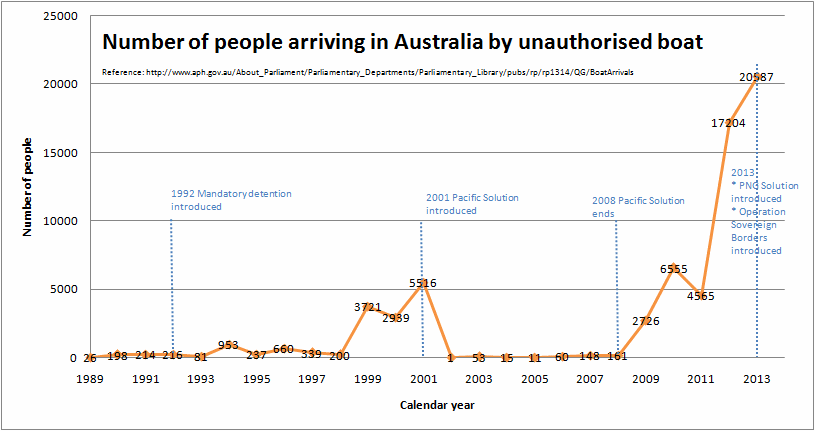
Persons arriving by unauthorised boat to Australia by calendar year

This issue of government policy towards unauthorised arrivals seeking asylum in Australia has been of major significance throughout the tenure of the Gillard government. During the first Rudd-Gillard leadership spill of 2010, outgoing Prime Minister Kevin Rudd said he feared a "lurch to the right" under a Gillard prime ministership. Rudd had dismantled key components of the Howard government's asylum seeker policy, including the Pacific Solution offshore processing system. The Gillard government initially maintained Rudd's policies, downplayed the notion of "pull-factors" attracting increased numbers of boat arrivals and criticised offshore processing at Nauru but, by September 2012, after the High Court had rejected an alternative plan to exchange asylum seekers for processed refugees from Malaysia amid an extended surge in boat arrivals and deaths at sea, the Gillard government confirmed support for offshore processing, and announced it would re-open sites at Nauru and Manus Island.

After winning leadership of the Labor Party, Gillard identified addressing the issue of unauthorised arrivals of asylum seekers as one of three key policy areas requiring the attention of her government. She announced that negotiations were underway for a return to "offshore processing" of asylum seeker claims. Gillard ruled out a return to processing at Nauru because it was not a signatory to the UN Refugee Convention, and named East Timor as a preferred location for new detention and processing facilities. The East Timorese government rejected the plan.

For the final few years of the Howard government, people smuggling between Indonesia and Australia had virtually ceased and Australia's offshore detention centres were near empty. The newly elected Rudd government announced a series of measures aimed at achieving what it described as a more "compassionate policy". The Pacific Solution had involved offshore processing, a system of "temporary protection visas" for unauthorised arrivals, and a policy of turning back boats where possible. The Rudd government dismantled all three components, dubbing them "ineffectual and wasteful". Throughout 2009–2010, a flow of boat arrivals re-emerged. In October 2010, the Gillard government announced that it would open two detention centres for 2000 immigrants, due to the pressures in allowing women and children to be released into the community. One to be opened in Inverbrackie, South Australia and one in Northam, Western Australia. She said it would be a short-term solution to the problem and that temporary detention centres will be closed.

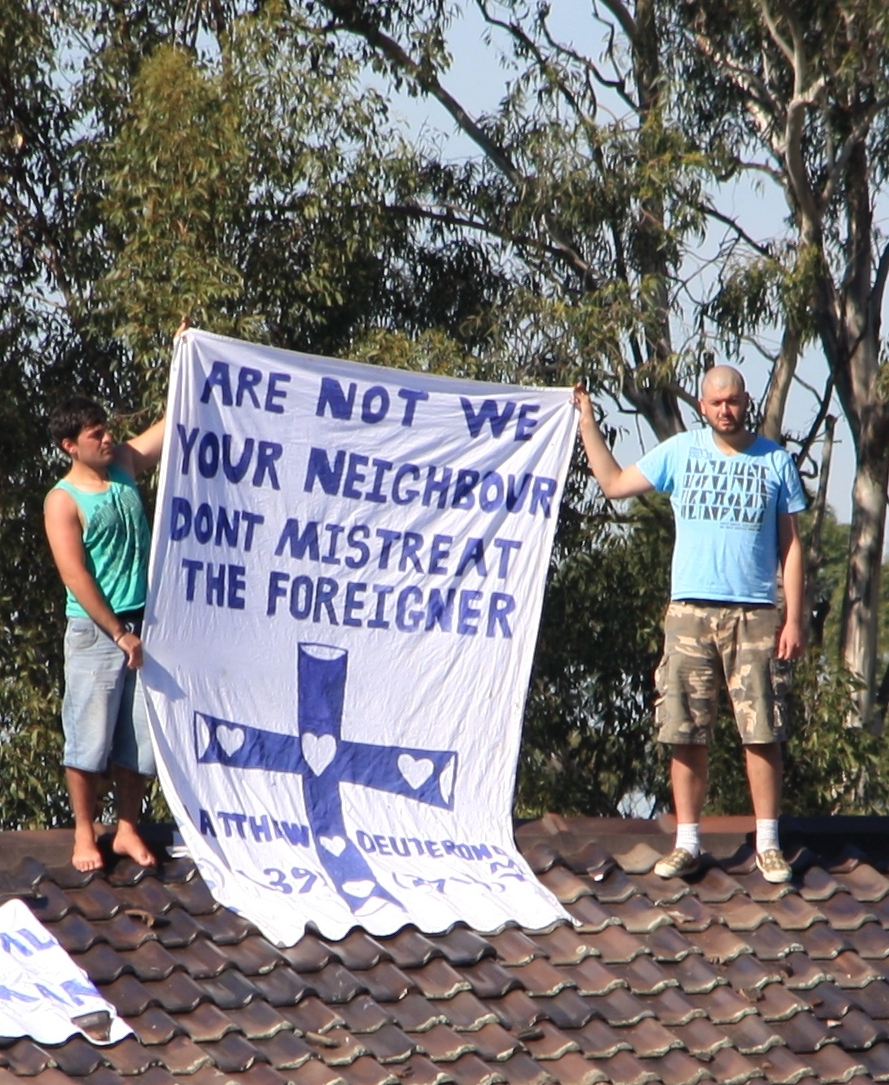
Protesters on the roof of the Villawood Immigration Detention Centre in Sydney, 2011

On 15 December 2010 a ship containing 89 asylum seekers crashed on the shore of Christmas Island, killing up to fifty people. Refugee and migrant advocates condemned government policy as responsible for the tragedy, and ALP Party President Anna Bligh called for a complete review of ALP asylum seeker policy. Gillard returned early from holidays in response to the crash, and to review asylum seeker policy. Some months later Gillard would announce "The Malaysia Solution" in response.

In April 2011 the federal government confirmed that a detention centre for single men will be built at the old army barracks at Pontville, 45 minutes north of Hobart. This immigration detention centre will house up to 400 refugees. Also in April 2011 immigration detainees at the Villawood detention centre rioted in protest of their treatment, setting fire to several buildings.

===== Restoration of offshore processing =====
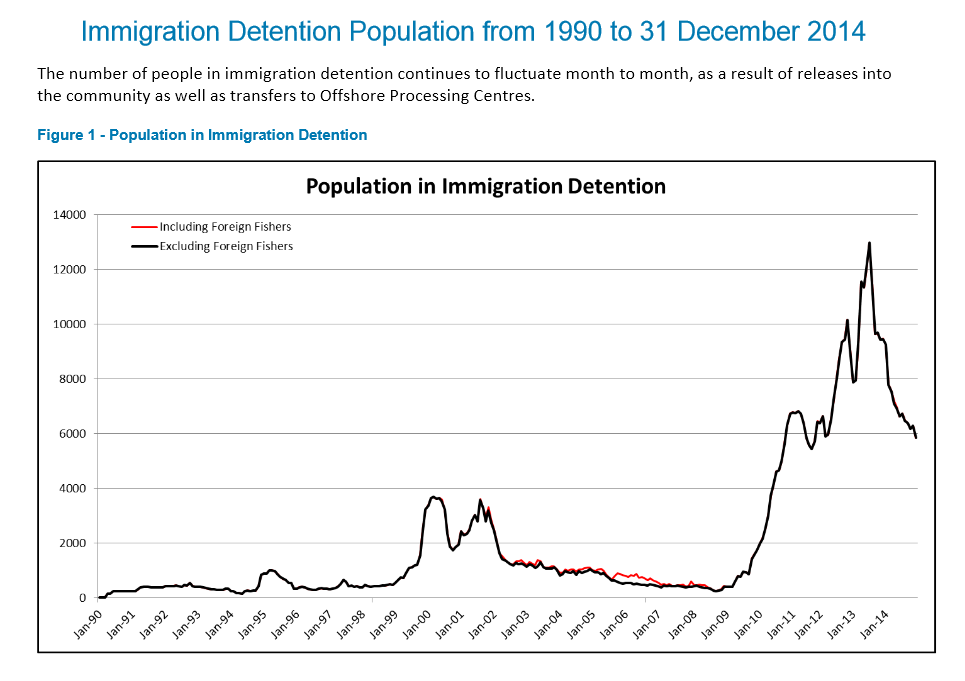
Immigration Detention Population to December 2014

In May 2011 Gillard announced that Australia and Malaysia were "finalising" an arrangement to exchange asylum seekers for processed refugees (the plan was dubbed the "Malaysia Solution"). Malaysia was not a signatory to the UN Refugee Convention, which Nauru has now moved to sign, but the government maintained that while it no longer believed that only signatories to the Convention were suitable, Nauru would not be feasible. Gillard and Immigration Minister Chris Bowen said they were close to signing a bilateral agreement which would result in 800 asylum seekers who arrive in Australia by boat being taken to Malaysia instead and Australia would take 4,000 people from Malaysia who had previously been assessed as refugees. On 31 August the High Court ruled that the agreement to transfer refugees from Australia to Malaysia was invalid, and ordered that it not proceed on the basis that it contravened human rights protections established under existing laws. In an unusual attack on the judiciary, Gillard questioned the consistency of Chief Justice Robert French as she faced political criticism over the rejection of the Malaysia Solution. She accused the court of missing an opportunity to "send a message" to asylum-seekers, sparking opposition charges she had breached the doctrine of the separation of powers.

The government was unable to secure the support of the Greens or Opposition in the Senate for modifications to enable the Malaysia Solution to proceed and instead reverted to expanding onshore processing arrangements. Continued deaths at sea and ongoing boat arrivals kept the issue at the fore of policy debate during the term of the Gillard government, leading to a major Parliamentary debate on the issue in June 2012, as news reports reached Canberra of another fatal sinking off Christmas Island. The government sought changes to the Migration Act to allow asylum seekers to be processed in Malaysia. The Greens opposed the Bill outright and called for greater opening up of Australia's borders. The Opposition opposed the Bill on human rights grounds and called for restoration of the Howard government's policies. The government allowed the possibility of returning processing to Nauru, on the condition that Malaysia was also permitted. Unable to secure passage of the Bill through Parliament following the emotional debate, the government convened a panel chaired by Angus Houston, which recommended the resumption of processing at Nauru and Manus Island. Gillard endorsed the plan in August 2012.

==== Migration ====
In relation to population targets for Australia, Gillard told Fairfax Media in August 2010 that while skilled migration is important: "I don't support the idea of a big Australia". Gillard also altered the nomenclature of Tony Burke's role as "Minister for Population" to that of "Minister for Sustainable Population". The government released a "sustainable population strategy" in May 2011 which did not specify a target population. In October 2011 trade minister Craig Emerson released a paper with Gillard's approval which advocated for continued population growth.

=== Indigenous affairs ===
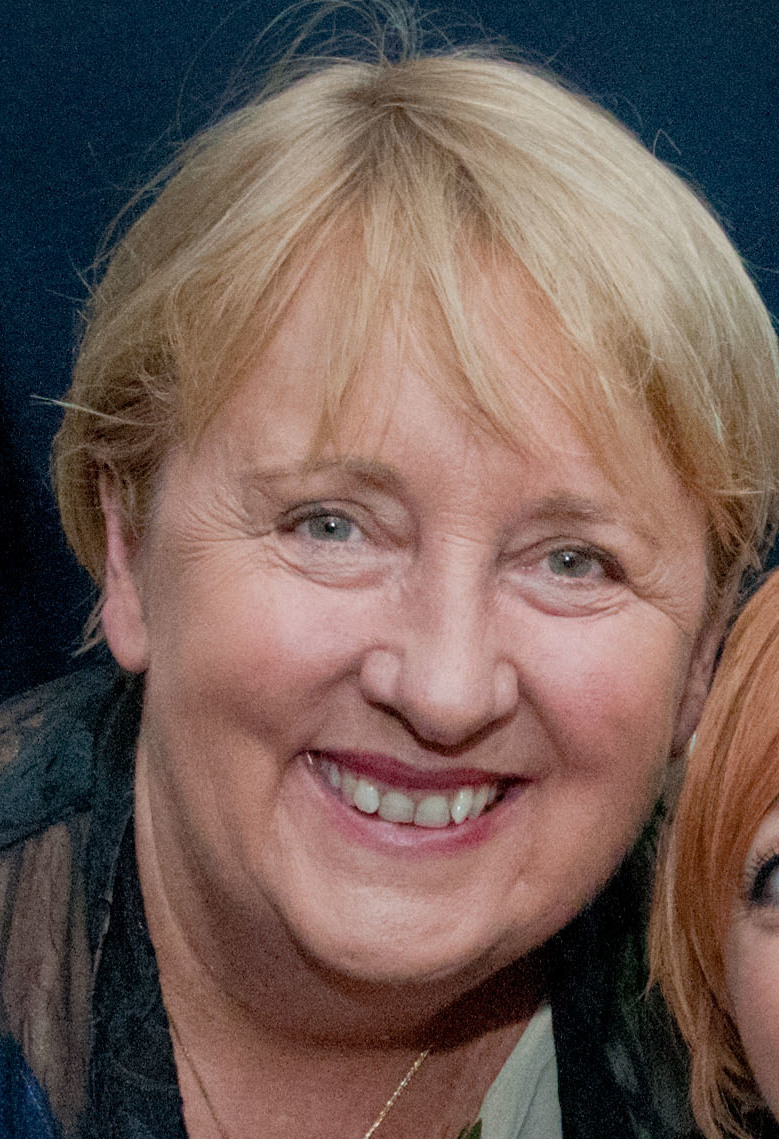
Indigenous Affairs Minister Jenny Macklin.

Jenny Macklin served as Minister for Indigenous Affairs through the term of the Rudd government and was re-appointed to the role by Julia Gillard. The Gillard government broadly maintained ongoing support for the Northern Territory Intervention instigated by the Howard government and continued by the Rudd government. The program was designed to address child welfare, drug and alcohol abuse and general law enforcement concerns in isolated indigenous communities. The annual Closing the Gap Report in 2012 found that infant mortality rates, literacy, numeracy and early childcare education had improved, but that school retention, employment and life expectancy rates remained poor. Gillard responded to the findings by saying: "Foundations are in place, work is underway. We can measure encouraging improvement right now."

Amid a 2010 campaign by indigenous activist Noel Pearson and Opposition Leader Tony Abbott to overturn the Queensland Bligh government's Wild Rivers Legislation, Prime Minister Gillard would not be drawn and referred the matter to a parliamentary committee. Pearson and Abbott argued that the Queensland State legislation denied Aboriginal people economic opportunities.

The Gillard government, with bi-partisan support, convened an expert panel to consider changes to the Australian Constitution that would see recognition for Indigenous Australians. The government's move was in line with a promise given to the Australian Greens to hold a referendum before the next election as part of a deal made following the 2010 election. The panel's broad membership included indigenous activist Noel Pearson and Pat Dodson and Liberal Parliamentarian Ken Wyatt. The government promised to hold a referendum on the constitutional recognition of indigenous Australians on or before the federal election due for 2013. The plan was abandoned in September 2012, with Jenny Macklin citing insufficient community awareness for the decision.

=== Foreign policy ===
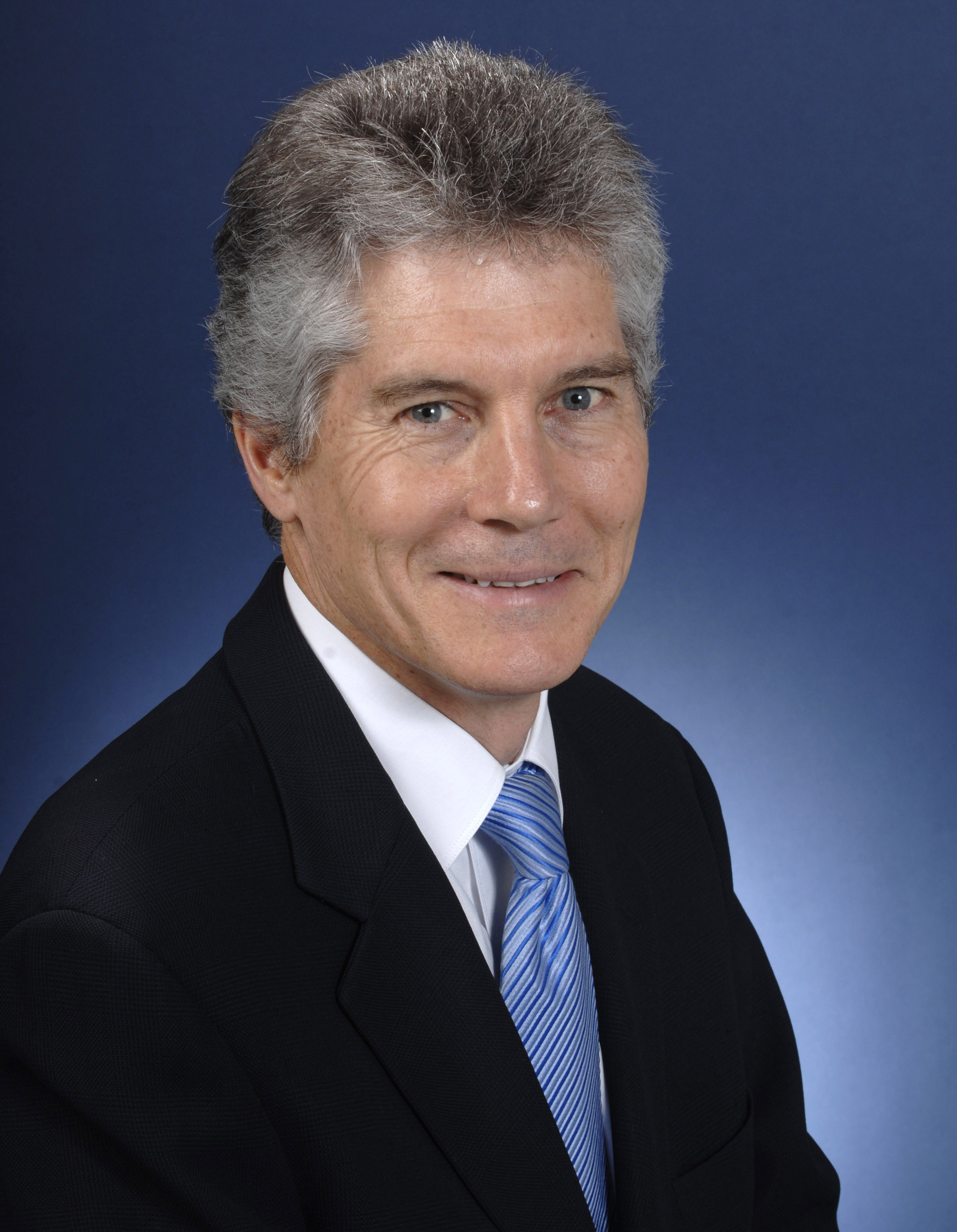
Stephen Smith served as Minister for Foreign Affairs in the first Gillard Ministry. He was replaced by Kevin Rudd who later unsuccessfully challenged for the Labor leadership and lost his Cabinet position.

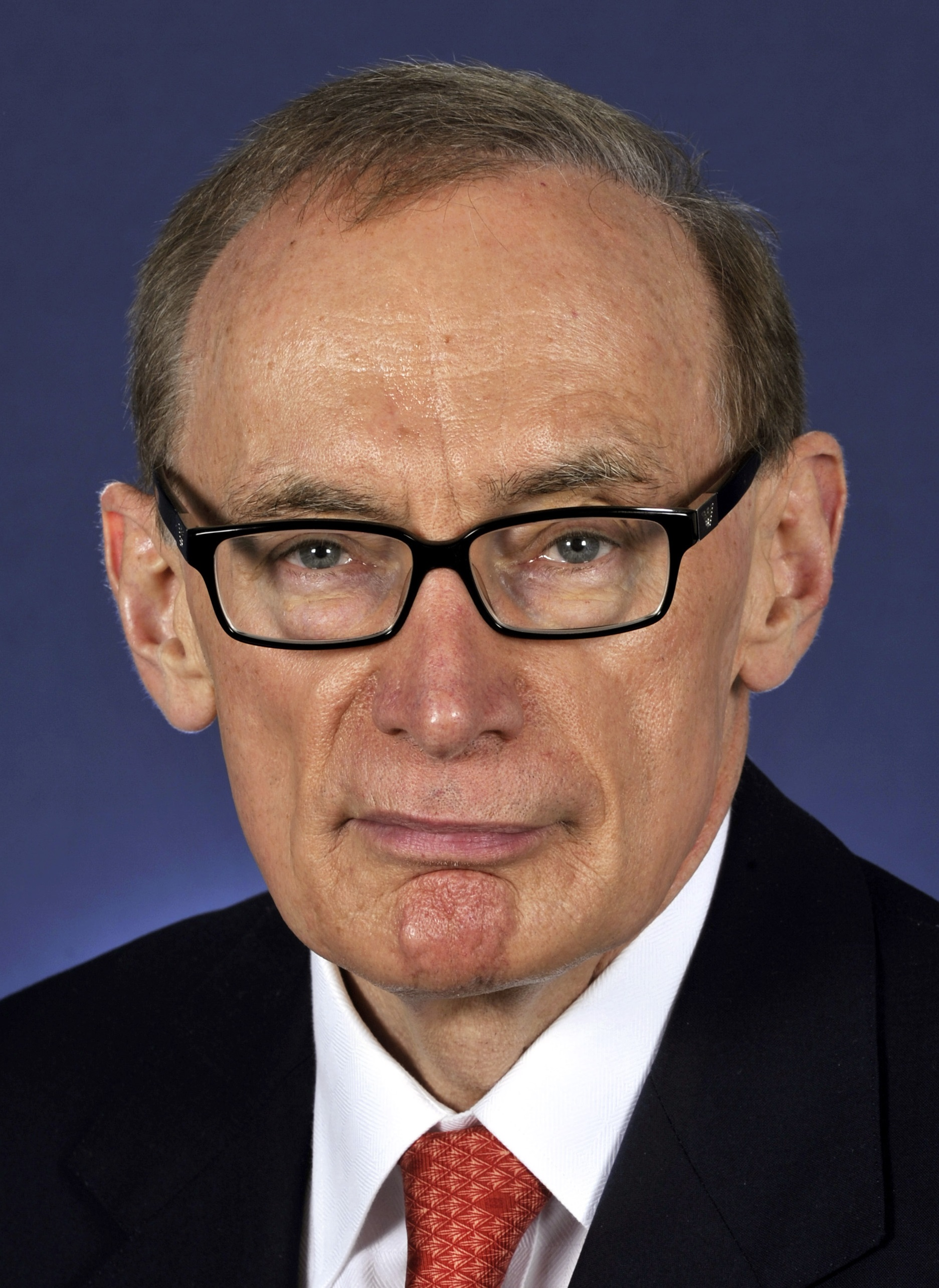
Former New South Wales Premier Bob Carr joined Cabinet as Minister for Foreign Affairs following Kevin Rudd's failed February 2012 bid for the Labor leadership.

Stephen Smith served in the first Gillard Ministry as Minister for Foreign Affairs. Following the 2010 election, Gillard appointed her former leader Kevin Rudd (a career diplomat) to the portfolio. Relations between the pair remained strained, and Rudd was replaced as foreign minister in February 2012 following his failed bid for the leadership of the Labor Party. Former New South Wales Premier Bob Carr was selected to join the Senate in place of the retiring Mark Arbib and joined Cabinet as the new Minister for Foreign Affairs.

During her first major international tour as prime minister, Julia Gillard told ABC TV's 7.30 Report:

[F]oreign policy is not my passion. It's not what I've spent my life doing. You know, I came into politics predominantly to make a difference to opportunity questions, particularly make a difference in education. So, yes, if I had a choice I'd probably more be in a school watching kids learn to read in Australia than here in Brussels at international meetings.

For his part, Kevin Rudd was an active Foreign Affairs Minister. Following the 2011 Egyptian revolution and resignation of Egyptian president Hosni Mubarak, Rudd called for "constitutional reform and a clear timetable towards free and fair elections". In response to the 2011 Libyan civil war, Rudd announced in early March 2011 that a no-fly zone should be enforced by the international community as a "lesser of two evils" to prevent dictator Muammar Gaddafi from using the Libyan airforce to attack protesters and rebels. The Age and other media outlets reported this as representing a rift between Rudd and Prime Minister Gillard, and said that US officials in Canberra had sought official clarification on what the Australian government was proposing. Speaking from Washington, Ms Gillard said in response that the United Nations Security Council should consider a "full range" of options to deal with the situation, and that Australia was not planning to send forces to enforce a no-fly zone.

For her part, Prime Minister Gillard attended the APEC Japan 2010 summit in, where she held her first face-to-face meeting with US President Barack Obama. Obama thanked the Prime Minister for Australia's continuing assistance and contribution to the Afghanistan War. While Gillard sent her condolences to the American people and the President for the American casualties in Afghanistan

Gillard travelled to the United States in March 2011 to mark the 60th Anniversary of the ANZUS Alliance and was invited to address the United States Congress. Gillard made her first visit to Washington as prime minister on 5 March 2011. She held meetings with President Barack Obama, Secretary of State Hillary Clinton, Treasury Secretary Timothy Geithner and UN Secretary General Ban Ki-moon. She also met with Michelle Obama and John McCain. Gillard, addressed a joint session of the United States Congress, the fourth Australian leader to do and first foreign dignitary to address the 112th congress.

In April 2011, Gillard embarked on a North Asia trip, promoting closer military, economic and trade ties. Her visit to Japan was the first by a foreign dignitary after the devastating earthquake and tsunami. South Korea and China were also part of her trip.

Gillard was the first foreign leader to address the Parliament of New Zealand.

In Commonwealth relations, Gillard represented Australia at the Wedding of Prince William and Catherine Middleton in London in April 2011 and hosted the Commonwealth Heads of Government Meeting (CHOGM) in Perth in October of that year. The Perth CHOGM saw the historic announcement, by Gillard and British Prime Minister David Cameron, of changes to the succession laws regarding to thrones of the Commonwealth realms, overturning rules privileging male over female heirs to the line of succession and removing a ban on Roman Catholic consorts.

In late 2011, the Gillard government reversed the Rudd government's policy of blocking uranium sales to India for not being a signatory to the Nuclear Non-Proliferation Treaty. Tensions between Rudd and Gillard culminated in the Australian Labor Party leadership spill, 2012. On 23 February 2012, Rudd was replaced as Minister for Foreign Affairs by Craig Emerson (on an acting basis), and then by former NSW Premier and new Senator Bob Carr on 13 March. Outlining his views on managing Australia's important relationships with China and the United States, Carr said:

For the first time in our history the nation with which we have the major economic relationship is a nation with different values and a different form of government from our own. So one can't say there aren't challenges in this relationship, but, ultimately, we don't have to choose America or China.

In another early foray into his new portfolio which proved controversial, Carr threatened sanctions against Papua New Guinea in the event of delayed elections there.

Gillard toured India in October, seeking to strengthen ties. On 19 October 2012, Australia secured election to a seat as a Non-Permanent Member of the United Nations Security Council. The initiative had been launched by the Rudd government.

In October 2012, the government released the Asian Century White Paper, offering a strategic framework for "Australia's navigation of the Asian Century". The report included focus on Australia's relations with China, India, the key ASEAN countries as well as Japan and South Korea.

In the lead up to historic November 2012 United Nations vote to promote Palestine's status to that of "non-member observer state", Gillard argued to Cabinet for a "no" vote. Gillard said a "yes vote" would set back the Mid East peace process. Cabinet ultimately determined to abstain in the vote, which was carried with a large majority at the United Nations, but with the opposition of the United States. Bob Carr said the vote would "encourage peace talks".

=== Defence policy ===
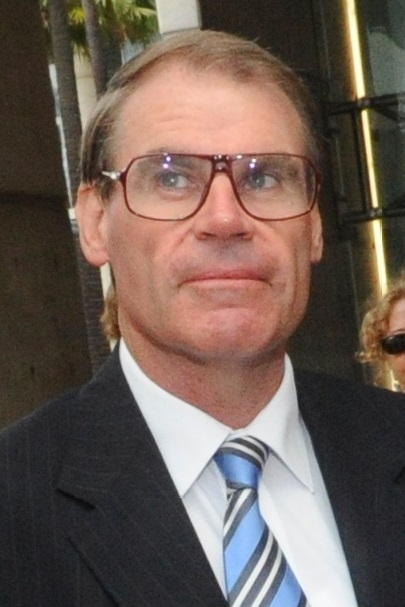
Senator John Faulkner served as Defence Minister in the first months of the Gillard government.

John Faulkner served as Minister for Defence during the initial months of the Gillard government and was succeeded by Stephen Smith following the 2010 Election and return of Kevin Rudd to the Foreign Affairs portfolio.

The Rudd government in its 2009 Whitepaper on Defence had outlined a series of avenues for expansion of Australia's independent defence capacity – including a major upgrade of the Royal Australian Navy and Royal Australian Air Force: including the purchase of new submarines, frigates and combat aircraft. The Whitepaper cited the rise of China as representing a potential threat to the future security of the Asia-Pacific. In 2012, the Gillard government announced that the key measures recommended in the Whitepaper would be delayed or cut amid a $5.5 billion reduction in defence spending. Treasurer Wayne Swan's 2012 Budget announced a series of cuts in defence spending to assist in the government's plan for restoration of a Federal Budget surplus. The Gillard government reduced military spending to 1.6% of gross domestic product (the lowest level since the 1930s).

The Gillard government had inherited the Howard and Rudd governments' commitment to the War in Afghanistan which followed the 2001 11 September attacks in the United States. In November 2011, the Obama Administration and Gillard government confirmed a plan to increase the US military presence in northern Australia. Defence Minister Stephen Smith welcomed the first contingent of 200 US Marines to Darwin in April 2012 – with the force projected to grow to 2500.

==== War in Afghanistan ====
Since coming to office, Gillard has remained adamant towards her position in the Afghanistan War. The Gillard government believes that withdrawing troops prematurely from Afghanistan, could re-establish the country as a 'safe haven' for terrorists. On 19 October 2010 Prime Minister Gillard addressed Parliament stating her government's commitment to the war, and said "Australia will stand firm in our commitment to our alliance with the United States, the international community understands this, our friends and allies understand this, and our enemies understand this too". On her first day as prime minister, Gillard reassured her position towards the war to President Barack Obama of the United States.

Prime Minister Gillard made an official visit to Afghanistan, in October 2010. There she met members of the Australian Defence Force in Tarin Kowt, and had discussions with President Hamid Karzai. This visit was part of her first international trip as prime minister.

In April 2012, Prime Minister Gillard announced that her government would withdraw all Australian combat forces from Afghanistan by the end of 2013 – one year earlier than most expected.

=== Local government referendum ===
In May 2013 the Gillard government announced that a referendum would be held to recognise local governments in the Australian Constitution and allow the federal government to fund them directly. Similar referendums have been held by Labor governments in 1974 and 1988 but have failed to pass. The referendum was scheduled for the day of the 2013 election, which the government was planning to hold on 14 September 2013.

Prime Minister Gillard initially indicated that she believed the referendum would have bipartisan support, but the Opposition later expressed reservations about the plan.

=== Same-sex marriage ===
In September 2012, the House of Representatives rejected a bill introduced by Labor MP Stephen Jones aimed at legalising same-sex marriage by 98 votes to 42. The Senate subsequently voted against a bill to legalise same-sex marriage by 41 votes to 26. In both instances the Gillard Labor government allowed MPs a conscience vote whilst the opposition Liberal/National Coalition voted as a bloc against the legislation.

=== Social security ===
The Gillard government introduced new eligibility criteria for the Disability Support Pension in 2012 which caused a decline in eligibility rates.

=== Biosecurity ===
The Biosecurity Bill was introduced by the Gillard government in 2012, after being instigated by the findings of the 2008 Beale Review. It passed through parliament on 14 May 2015 with bipartisan support, as possibly "one of the most substantial and significant pieces of legislation to pass through Parliament during the term of the [Abbott] Government". The Biosecurity Act 2015 was a major reform of the Quarantine Act, in particular in its strengthening and modernising the existing framework of regulations governing biosecurity in Australia.

== Other ==
=== AWU affair ===
The issue of the AWU affair was raised in Federal Parliament in June 2012 by Labor MP Robert McClelland (a supporter of Gillard's leadership rival, Kevin Rudd, who had been demoted by Gillard). The affair concerned allegations of embezzlement via a fund established for the "AWU Workplace Reform Association" in the early 1990s by Bruce Wilson and Ralph Blewitt, officials of the Australian Workers' Union (AWU). Prime Minister Gillard had acted for Blewitt and Wilson (her then boyfriend) in setting up the association. Wilson and Blewitt were later accused of misappropriating funds. Gillard held two press conferences regarding the affair in 2012 to deny any wrongdoing. The Federal Opposition devoted its questions for the final sitting week of Parliament of 2012 to the affair. The Opposition concluded the week with a call for a judicial inquiry.

== Election year politics, 2013 ==
On 30 January 2013, Gillard announced in a National Press Club speech that she would ask Governor General Quentin Bryce later that day to issue writs to dissolve the House of Representatives on Monday, 12 August in preparation for an election on 14 September 2013. The eight months of notice provided by Gillard was believed to be the longest period of notice ever given by a prime minister in Australian history. However, Gillard would ultimately be deposed as prime minister by Kevin Rudd less than five months later, rendering apparently obsolete her government's commitment to any particular election date.

On 2 February, Gillard announced a cabinet reshuffle following the resignations of Attorney General Nicola Roxon and Labor Senate Leader Chris Evans from their respective positions. Mark Dreyfus replaced Roxon as Attorney-General and Minister for Emergency Management, and Stephen Conroy was elected as Labor's Senate leader. During the initial days following Gillard's announcement, suspended Labor MP Craig Thomson was arrested on fraud charges and, in New South Wales, the Independent Commission Against Corruption interviewed Eddie Obeid, a state Labor power broker, over high-level corruption allegations.

In February, treasurer Swan confirmed that the Gillard government's setpiece MRRT Mining Tax was running 90% below predicted returns for its first six months of operation. On 19 February, Greens leader Christine Milne announced that her party would therefore be ending their alliance with Labor, as the government had neglected an undertaking to tax the "big miners".

In a media interview published on 27 May 2013, Gillard stated that she is unwilling to commit to the Australian Labor Party leadership position if her government loses the 2013 election. Gillard explained: "You would have to talk to me about that in the days afterwards. I don't spend time thinking about the days beyond." As part of the same interview, Gillard urged Australian voters to provide her with an opportunity to rule with a majority so that compromises with the Greens and independents in both houses would not be necessary, as had been the case for the hung parliament during her term thus far.

In June, Gillard returned to the issue of gender politics in an address to an audience of supporters at a "Women for Gillard" function. She conveyed to the group that a government dominated by "men in blue ties" would see "women once again banished from the centre of Australia's political life". Some interpreted the remark as a reference to her leadership rival Rudd, as well as Opposition Leader Tony Abbott, due to the Labor leadership speculation at the time. Gillard also expressed concern over the potential for the abortion issue to be transformed into a "political plaything" of men if she lost office. In the wake of the "blue ties and abortion speech", a Fairfax-Nielsen poll from mid-June 2013 found that Labor's standing among men dropped by 7%, while the party garnered 29% of the overall primary vote.

=== Ongoing leadership discussion ===
Amid ongoing poor polling results for Labor, ABC journalist Barrie Cassidy triggered renewed leadership speculation on 9 June 2013 by expressing on the Insiders television programme a belief that Gillard would not lead Labor into the election. On 10 June 2013, the ABC reported that the security of Gillard's position for the September 2013 election was in doubt following the loss of significant support in the Labor caucus. Furthermore, polling in the preceding week indicated that the party could be left with the low number of 40 seats in Federal Parliament, while one Labor backbencher compared the Labor Party to the Titanic.

The ABC reported that "some former staunch supporters" hold the view that Gillard cannot win the election and on 14 June Western Sydney Labor MP John Murphy called on Gillard to step down in favour of Rudd; Cassidy identified Rudd as the only feasible replacement. In response, Gillard dismissed the June leadership discussion as "wasted breath". On 22 June, The Age newspaper called upon Gillard to resign for the good of the Labor Party, the nation and the democratic process, "so that vigorous, policy-driven democratic debate can flourish once again". Editor-in-chief Andrew Holden explained that the newspaper's decision was based on the information that it had received in the preceding week that indicated that Gillard's communication had not resonated with the electorate.

== Cabinet ==
Following Gillard's selection as Labor leader in June 2010, the first Gillard Ministry did not differ markedly from that of the predecessor Rudd government, although former Prime Minister Rudd became a back bencher and Treasurer Swan became deputy prime minister. Gillard promised to restore Rudd to the ministry if Labor was to win the next election. Gillard allocated her former responsibilities of Education, Workplace Relations and Social Inclusion to veteran minister Simon Crean. Stephen Smith remained as foreign minister, but also assumed Crean's Trade portfolio.

Following Labor's return at the 2010 Election, the second Gillard Ministry saw Rudd return to Cabinet as Australia's Foreign Minister. The announcement of the ministry was delayed due to negotiations over minority government support from the cross benches. Bill Shorten was promoted to the position of Assistant Treasurer, and David Feeney and Don Farrell became parliamentary secretaries. Gillard reinstated Warren Snowdon as Minister for Indigenous Health, after she previously abolished the position, while a number of ministerial positions were retitled.

In a reshuffle in December 2011 Tanya Plibersek became the Minister of Health, while Nicola Roxon became promoted to Attorney-General.

Kevin Rudd, Mark Arbib, and Robert McClelland resigned from the ministry due to a leadership challenge against Gillard, in which Rudd lost. They were replaced by Bob Carr, Nicola Roxon, Tony Burke, and Brendan O'Connor.

On 4 February 2013 Nicola Roxon and Chris Evans resigned. On 25 March 2013 Simon Crean was sacked as a minister due to Australian Labor Party leadership spill, March 2013. Chris Bowen and Martin Ferguson resigned their positions.
