= Australian Industry Group =

Australian employers' organisation

- Type: NGO
- Purpose: To represent business interests
- Region served: Australia
- Chief Executive: Innes Willox
- Staff: 300+
- Website: www.australianindustrygroup.com.au

The Australian Industry Group, also called Ai Group, is an employers' organisation, whose members employ over 750,000 people throughout Australia. The organisation covers a wide range of industries including manufacturing, engineering, construction, automotive, food, transport, information technology, telecommunications, call centres, labour hire, printing, defence, mining equipment and supplies, airlines, and other related service industries. It is one of the largest industry organisations in Australia.

Ai Group actively collaborates with institutions such as the Housing Industry Association, the accountancy firm PriceWaterhouseCoopers, and the Commonwealth Bank to produce surveys of the various industries it represents, releasing both status reports on large sections of the Australian economy, and of specific industries like the Australian construction industry and the manufacturing sector. Deloitte sponsors Ai Group's premier annual event the National Forum and Annual National Dinner. The group maintains influences in a variety of public policy areas, weighing in on such issues as the response to the Fair Work Act 2009, minimum wage, skill shortages, environment and energy, occupational health and safety, trade, and defence. Ai Group provides information, advice and assistance to help members. Through policy leadership and research-based advocacy members are represented at all levels of government by representing and promoting their interests on current and emerging issues.

Ai Group members operate small, medium and large businesses. They include many major Australian and global companies operating in a range of industries. The Group itself employs more than 300 people and 550 apprentices and trainees through its training arm, Australian Industry Group Training Services.

== History ==
The Australian Industry Group traces its foundations back to 1873, with the creation of the Metal Trades Industry Association (MTIA). In 1998, MTIA merged with the Australian Chamber of Manufactures (ACM), forming Ai Group.

Ai Group has a strong media presence and is also on Twitter with the account @The_AiGroup.

== Services ==
The organisation includes workplace relations advisers, lawyers and employment and business specialists who provide services to members in the areas of workplace relations, legal, human resource management, occupational health and safety, workers' compensation, the environment and energy, international trade and export, economics, tax, business growth and skills.

== Management ==
Innes Willox was appointed as the Chief Executive of Ai Group in 2012 and is their chief spokesperson. Heather Ridout previously held the role. Ai Group also operates the Ai Group Defence Council, which is the peak body representing the defence industry in Australia. Ai Group also manages the Australian Constructors Association.

== Affiliations ==
Ai Group is closely affiliated with more than 50 other employer groups in Australia alone and directly manages a number of those organisations.

The organisation has formal and long standing links with more than 80 overseas employer organisations such as the Confederation of Indian Industry; the Chinese Machinery Industry Federation; The Osaka Chamber of Commerce and Industry; the Federation of Malaysian Manufacturers; the US National Association of Manufacturers; the Confederation of British Industry and Business New Zealand.

== See also ==
- Economy of Australia
