= Efficiency dividend =

An efficiency dividend is an annual reduction in resources available to an organization. It is usually applied as a percentage of operational (running) costs.

It has been used by the Australian Government on Australian Public Service departments and agencies since 1987. Some departments and agencies have been exempted.

== History ==
A 1.25% efficiency dividend was introduced by the Bob Hawke Government in 1987–88. It was reduced to 1% from 1994–95 to 2004-2005 then increased to 1.25% from 2005 to 2006. For 2008-09 a one-off 2% efficiency dividend on top of the ongoing efficiency dividend was applied. In 2011-12 it was 1.5% and in 2012-13 another extra one-off 2.5% was applied.

== Controversy ==
Proponents of the efficiency dividend argue that it improves the cost effectiveness of the public sector, allows managerial flexibility in the allocation of resources, and is a good way to generate savings in the cost of public sector administration. Critics have described the efficiency dividend as a blunt instrument, a false economy, and lazy budgeting. Smaller agencies have also highlighted the difficulty in finding such savings.
