= Innes Willox =

Australian journalist, diplomat and lobbyist (born 1963)

Innes Willox AM
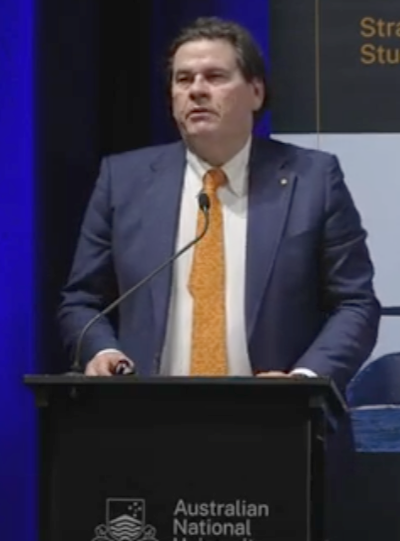
- Speaking at the Australian National University in 2023
- Born: 1963 (age 62–63); Aberdeen, Scotland
- Education: Monash University
- Occupations: Journalist; Political staffer; Diplomat; Lobbyist
- Known for: CEO of Australian Industry Group (2012–present); Australian Consul-General in Los Angeles (2006–2008); Chief political correspondent of The Age

Innes Willox AM (born 1963) is an Australian lobbyist and a former journalist, political staffer and diplomat. He has been the chief executive of the Australian Industry Group since 2012. He previously served as Australia's Consul-General in Los Angeles (2006–2008), as chief of staff to foreign minister Alexander Downer (2004–2006), and as chief political correspondent of The Age.

== Early life ==
Willox was born in Aberdeen, Scotland. He arrived in Australia at a young age where his father became the production manager of an Adelaide fish cannery. His family later moved to Melbourne where he was the school captain of Melbourne High School and went on to study arts at Monash University.

== Career ==
=== Journalism ===
Willox took up a cadetship with The Herald, then part of The Herald and Weekly Times, after leaving university. He later joined The Age. He later worked for that newspaper as a crime reporter and investigative journalist. He was appointed as the newspaper's chief of staff at the age of 26, overseeing 130 reporters, and eventually replaced Michelle Grattan as the newspaper's chief political correspondent with the Canberra Press Gallery.

=== Public sector ===
In June 1997 Willox became a media adviser to Alexander Downer, the foreign minister in the Howard government. He resigned in 2000 to work with Singapore Airlines as corporate affairs manager, but returned to work for Downer in 2004 as chief of staff. He served as Australia's Consul-General in Los Angeles from 2006 to 2008.

=== Australian Industry Group ===
Willox joined the Australian Industry Group in 2008 as director of international and government arrangements. He was appointed chief executive of the organisation in February 2012, in place of Heather Ridout. He also serves as a director of AustralianSuper.

Willox was appointed Member of the Order of Australia (AM) in the 2020 Queen's Birthday Honours, for "significant service to business, particularly to industry, and to the community".
