= October 2013 Australian Labor Party leadership election =

- 10–13 October 2013
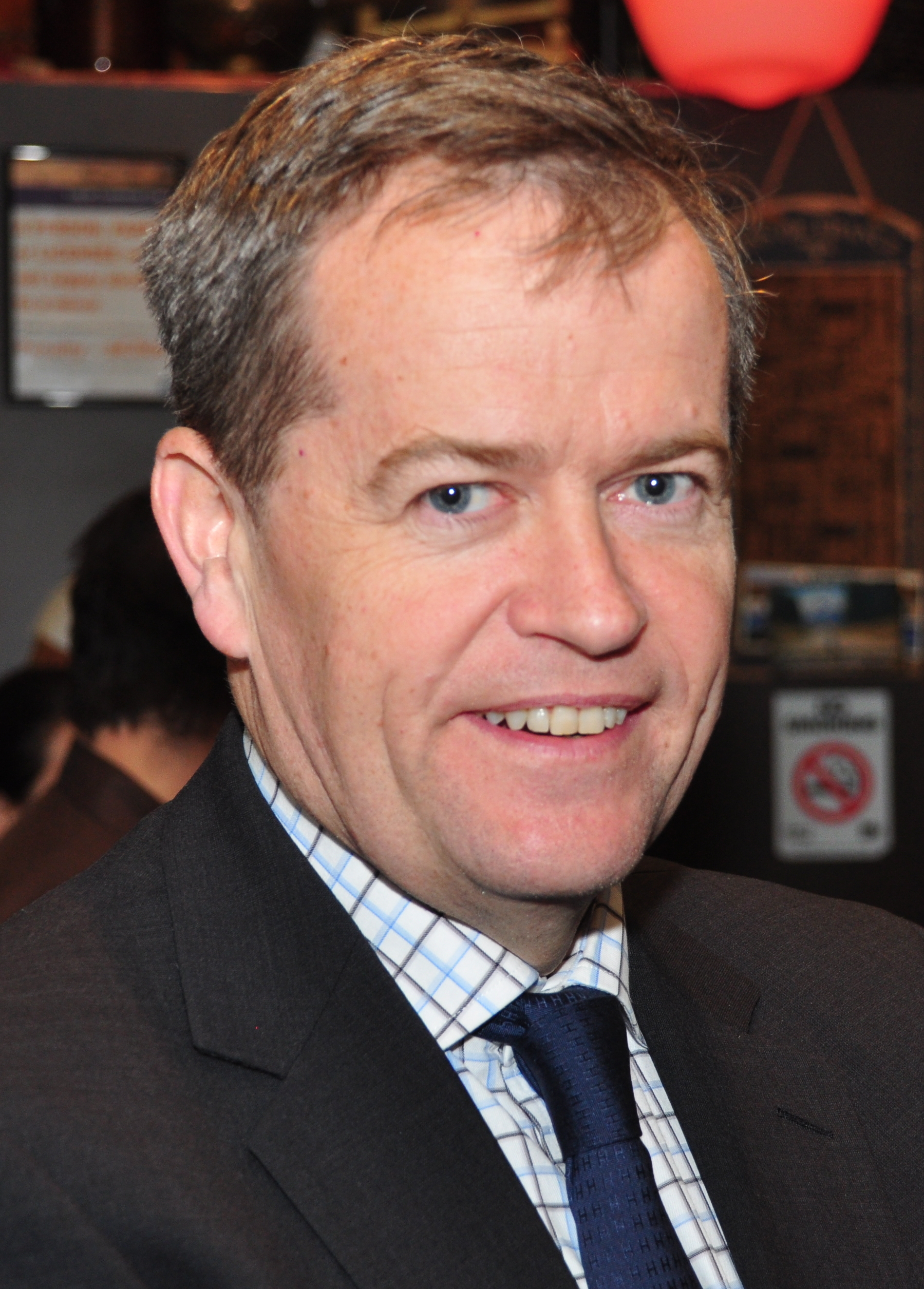

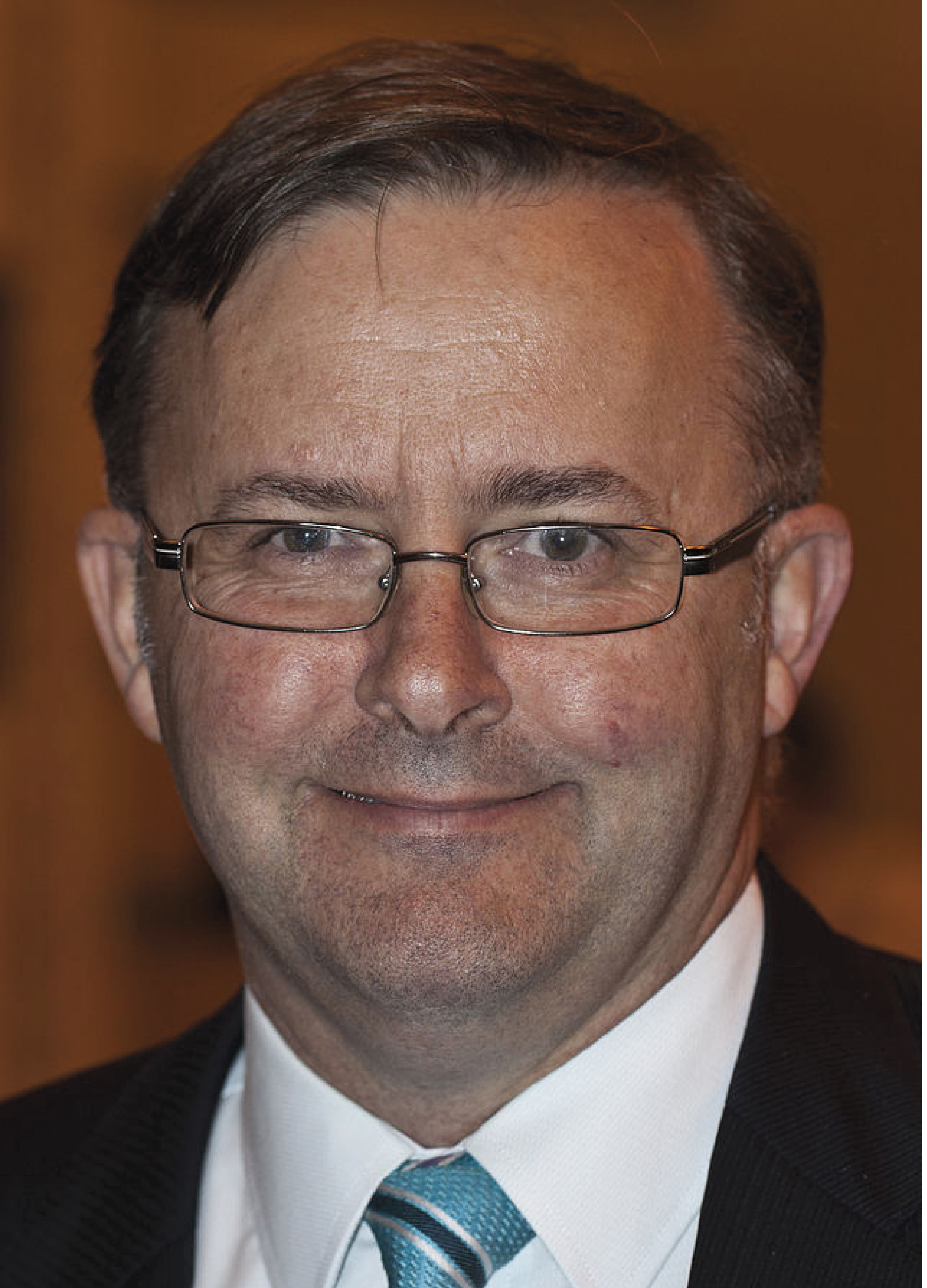
Candidate	Bill Shorten	Anthony Albanese
Percentage	52.0%	48.0%
Caucus	55 (64.0%)	31 (36.0%)
Members	12,196 (40.1%)	18,230 (59.9%)
Seat	Maribyrnong (VIC)	Grayndler (NSW)
Faction	Right	Left
Leader before election
Kevin Rudd
Chris Bowen (interim)
Elected Leader
Bill Shorten

A leadership election was held in October 2013 to select Kevin Rudd's replacement as leader of the Australian Labor Party and Leader of the Opposition. Bill Shorten was elected party leader, and Tanya Plibersek was later confirmed as deputy leader.

The declared candidates were Bill Shorten and Anthony Albanese, who were both ministers in the outgoing Labor government. Nominations closed on 20 September 2013.

Under new rules, the new leader was elected by public members of the Australian Labor Party over a period of twenty days, followed by a ballot of the Labor parliamentary party. Each of these two voting blocs was weighted equally in determining the winner.

During the leadership election, Chris Bowen, former Treasurer of Australia and Member of Parliament for McMahon, was Interim Leader of the Labor Party and served as Leader of the Opposition.

Tanya Plibersek was unopposed in succeeding Anthony Albanese as deputy leader.

As of 2026, the 2013 Labor Party leadership election was the first and only leadership election where public party members voted in the election.

== Background ==
After three years of instability in the Labor leadership in which four leadership spills were held between Kevin Rudd and Julia Gillard, this contest featured neither. Gillard retired from parliament at the election, while Rudd announced on election night that he would step down as Labor leader and return to the backbench in his concession speech at the Gabba in Brisbane following Labor's defeat.

Earlier in the year the ALP caucus approved changes to the way the federal parliamentary leader is chosen. The new rules make it more difficult to change leaders and require a ballot of the party membership on contested leadership spills. The new rules encourage the parliamentary party to only nominate one candidate, to avoid a month-long ballot of the general party membership. The new rules are controversial, however, and have been publicly criticised by ALP Senator Stephen Conroy and former Prime Minister Julia Gillard.

Nominations opened at a parliamentary party meeting on Friday 13 September 2013, and remained open for a week. Anthony Albanese and Bill Shorten formally nominated. As there was more than one nomination, a ballot of the parliamentary party and another of the organisational party were required. The ballot of the organisational party lasted for two weeks.

== Process ==
Under the new Labor rules, nominations were open for one week beginning 13 September 2013. To be a nominated candidate, a nominee must receive the support of 20% of caucus. After the conclusion of nominations, ballots were sent to grassroots party members, who had two weeks to return their ballots. On 10 October 2013, the caucus cast their vote for leader and the grassroots ballots were counted. The two voting pools were weighted 50/50 (Caucus and grassroots each consisting 50% of the final count) and the leader declared elected accordingly.

Historically, the ALP have determined the members of cabinet (or shadow cabinet) in caucus, with the leader assigning portfolios. This is unchanged, and the parliamentary caucus of Labor elected the executive at the same time they cast voters for leader. Only the election for the parliamentary leader involved the votes of grassroots party members.

Originally only members of two years' standing were eligible to vote, but this was later widened to all ALP party members who were financial as of 7 September 2013.

== Candidates ==
=== Declared ===
- Anthony Albanese, Deputy Prime Minister (2013)
  - Supporters: Greg Combet, Jenny Macklin, and Penny Wong
- Bill Shorten, Minister for Workplace Relations (2011–2013) and Minister for Education (2013)
  - Supporters: Paul Howes, Nicola Roxon, Kate Ellis, Peter Beattie, Mark Latham, Bob Carr, and Simon Crean

=== Declined ===
The following individuals ruled themselves out as candidates or were the subject of media speculation but did not stand:

- Chris Bowen, Treasurer (2013) and interim leader (2013)
- Tony Burke, Minister for Immigration (2013)
- Bob Carr, Minister for Foreign Affairs (2012–2013) and Premier of New South Wales (1995–2005)
- Jason Clare, Minister for Justice and Home Affairs (2011–2013)
- Tanya Plibersek, Minister for Health (2011–2013)
- Wayne Swan, Deputy Prime Minister (2010–2013) and Treasurer (2007–2013)

== Caucus support ==
Shortly before the caucus vote, on 10 October, Crikey reported that Shorten had garnered the support of 49 MPs to Albanese's 36.

Albanese		Shorten	
MP	Faction	MP	Faction
Anthony Albanese	Hard Left	Catryna Bilyk	Right
Carol Brown	Left	Sharon Bird	Right
Mark Butler	Left	Mark Bishop	Right (SDA)
Doug Cameron	Hard Left	Chris Bowen	Right
Kim Carr	Left	Gai Brodtmann	Right
Sharon Claydon	Hard Left	Anna Burke	Labor Unity (SDA)
Julie Collins	Socialist Left	Tony Burke	Right
Pat Conroy	Left	Anthony Byrne	Labor Unity (SDA)
Justine Elliot	Right	Bob Carr	Right
John Faulkner	Left	Jim Chalmers	AWU
Andrew Giles	Socialist Left	Nick Champion	SDA
Alan Griffin	Socialist Left	Jason Clare	Right
Jill Hall	Left	Jacinta Collins	Labor Unity (SDA)
Stephen Jones	Hard Left	Stephen Conroy	Labor Unity
Catherine King	Socialist Left	Michael Danby	Labor Unity
Sue Lines	Soft Left	Sam Dastyari	Right
Kate Lundy	Left	Mark Dreyfus	Labor Unity
Jenny Macklin	Socialist Left	Don Farrell	Right (SDA)
Alannah MacTiernan	Unaligned	Kate Ellis	SDA
Gavin Marshall	Socialist Left	David Feeney	SDA
Anne McEwen	Left	Laurie Ferguson	Soft Left
Jan McLucas	Left	Joel Fitzgibbon	Right
Claire Moore	Left	Mark Furner	Old Guard
Brendan O'Connor	Independent Left	Alex Gallacher	Right
Julie Owens	Soft Left	Gary Gray	Right
Melissa Parke	Left	Chris Hayes	Right
Nova Peris	Unaligned	John Hogg	Right (SDA)
Graham Perrett	Left	Ed Husic	Right
Tanya Plibersek	Hard Left	Andrew Leigh	Unaligned
Louise Pratt	Hard Left	Joe Ludwig	Right (AWU)
Kevin Rudd	Old Guard	Richard Marles	Labor Unity
Lisa Singh	Left	Rob Mitchell	Labor Unity
Lin Thorp	Left	Shayne Neumann	Old Guard
Anne Urquhart	Left	Clare O'Neil	NUW
Penny Wong	Left	Helen Polley	Right (SDA)
Tony Zappia	Left	Bernie Ripoll	AWU
Unknown		Amanda Rishworth	SDA
MP	Faction	Michelle Rowland	Right
Lisa Chesters	Socialist Left	Joanne Ryan	Labor Unity
		Bill Shorten	Labor Unity
		Warren Snowdon	Left
		Ursula Stephens	Right
		Glenn Sterle	Right
		Wayne Swan	AWU
		Matt Thistlethwaite	Right
		Kelvin Thomson	Labor Unity
		Mehmet Tillem	Labor Unity
		Maria Vamvakinou	Socialist Left
		Tim Watts	Labor Unity

== Aftermath ==
With the leadership decided, caucus elections (without general party membership involvement) were held to determine the shadow ministry. In a return to ALP tradition, the shadow ministry were elected by caucus, with portfolio responsibilities to be assigned by the leader. Anna Burke, Warren Snowdon and Laurie Ferguson complained publicly about the process.

== See also ==
- Australian Labor Party leadership spill, 2010
- Australian Labor Party leadership spill, 2012
- Australian Labor Party leadership spill, March 2013
- Australian Labor Party leadership spill, June 2013
- 2013 Australian federal election
