= 2013 Australian Labor Party leadership spill =

2013 Australian Labor Party leadership spill may refer to:

- March 2013 Australian Labor Party leadership spill
- June 2013 Australian Labor Party leadership spill
- October 2013 Australian Labor Party leadership spill
