= Rudd government (2013) =

Australian government in 2013

Rudd government (II)

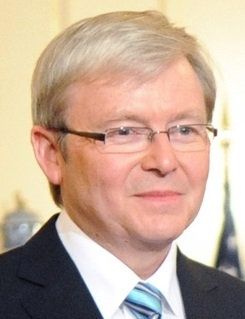

In office
- 27 June – 18 September 2013
- Monarch: Elizabeth II
- Governor-General: Dame Quentin Bryce
- Prime Minister: Kevin Rudd
- Party: Labor
- Status: Minority
- Origin: Rudd wins 2013 Labor leadership spill
- Demise: Labor loses 2013 federal election
- Predecessor: Gillard government
- Successor: Abbott government

The second Rudd government was the federal executive Government of Australia led by Prime Minister Kevin Rudd of the Australian Labor Party. It commenced on 27 June 2013 and ceased on 18 September 2013. Rudd had previously served a term as Prime Minister from 2007 to 2010 and been replaced by his deputy Julia Gillard, following an internal party spill. Rudd regained the Labor Party leadership by successfully re-challenging Gillard in a June 2013 party spill. On 5 August, Rudd called an election for 7 September 2013, which resulted in the defeat of his government by the Liberal/National Coalition led by Opposition Leader Tony Abbott.

== Background ==
=== First Rudd government ===
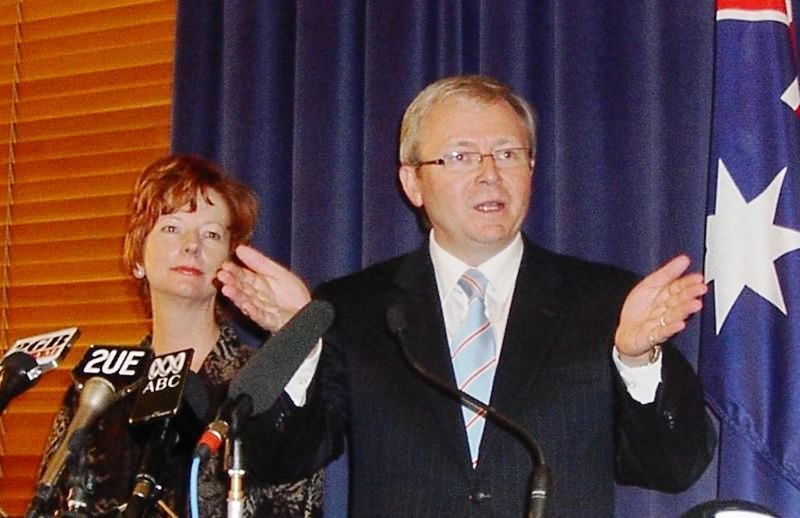
Julia Gillard with then opposition leader Kevin Rudd in 2006. Gillard became prime minister by challenging Kevin Rudd's leadership of the Australian Labor Party in 2010. Rudd replaced Gillard in 2013 following another internal leadership ballot.

Kevin Rudd, born in rural Queensland in 1957, a former diplomat and senior advisor to Queensland Premier Wayne Goss, entered the Australian parliament in 1998 as Member for Griffith and was appointed Shadow Foreign Affairs Minister in 2001. Rudd teamed successfully with Julia Gillard to challenge Opposition Leader Kim Beazley and Deputy Leader Jenny Macklin respectively for leadership and deputy leadership of the Australian Labor Party and became Leader of the Opposition in 2006. Rudd went on to lead Labor to victory at the 2007 federal election, defeating the incumbent Coalition government led by John Howard. Labor had been in opposition for eleven years, and despite an initial period of popularity, Rudd served just two-and-a-half years in office, becoming the first in a line of Australian leaders to be removed by their own party during their first term as prime minister.

In office, Rudd ratified the Kyoto Protocol, offered a Parliamentary apology to indigenous children removed from their parents by the state up to the mid-20th century, and organised the Australia 2020 Summit. In economic policy, his government re-regulated the labour market by rescinding the Howard government's Workchoices reforms and responded to the 2008 financial crisis with a large stimulus spending program. Rudd also dismantled the three pillars of the Howard government's asylum seeker processing system – offshore processing, temporary protection visas, and turning back unauthorised boats at sea – dubbing them "ineffectual and wasteful".

By 2010, Rudd's premiership faced difficulties. Following the failure of the government's insulation program and amidst controversy regarding the implementation of a tax on mining, the failure of the government to secure passage of its Carbon Trading Scheme and some policy debate about immigration policy, significant disaffection had arisen within Labor as to Rudd's leadership style and direction. A series of published and private opinion polls indicated that the Rudd government's popularity had declined to a potentially election-losing position. Rudd was challenged by Deputy Prime Minister Gillard to a party leadership ballot, which was held on the morning of 24 June 2010. Rudd did not stand for re-election, and Gillard was elected unopposed as Labor leader and sought her commission to be appointed as prime minister, thus ending the first Rudd government.

The Gillard government narrowly survived the 2010 federal election, forming a minority government with the support of four crossbench MPs after the election produced a hung parliament.

=== Gillard government ===
Leadership rivalry remained between Rudd and Gillard. Rudd announced his resignation as foreign minister on 22 February, citing a lack of support from Gillard and character attacks launched by Simon Crean and "a number of other faceless men" as the catalyst for his resignation. Gillard called a leadership ballot for 27 February. She also expanded upon the reasons for her original challenge of Rudd's leadership, saying that his government had entered a period of "paralysis" and that Rudd was operating along "difficult and chaotic work patterns". senior ministers launched stinging attacks on Rudd's legacy as prime minister. Deputy Prime Minister Wayne Swan lambasted Rudd as "dysfunctional". Gillard portrayed Rudd as a "chaotic" manager and would-be celebrity who led a "paralysed" government. Rudd portrayed Gillard as untrustworthy and unable to win an election. Rudd nominated Gillard's actions in relation to her promise not to implement a carbon tax; her East Timor and Malaysia Solution plans for asylum seekers; her written agreement with Andrew Wilkie on poker reforms and twelve months of low polling as key failings of Gillard's time in office. In an emotional address, Anthony Albanese announced that he had offered his resignation as Leader of the House of Representatives and would be supporting Rudd because he believed the manner in which he had been replaced in 2010 was wrong. Gillard refused to accept Albanese's resignation. Gillard won the ballot by 71 votes to 31.

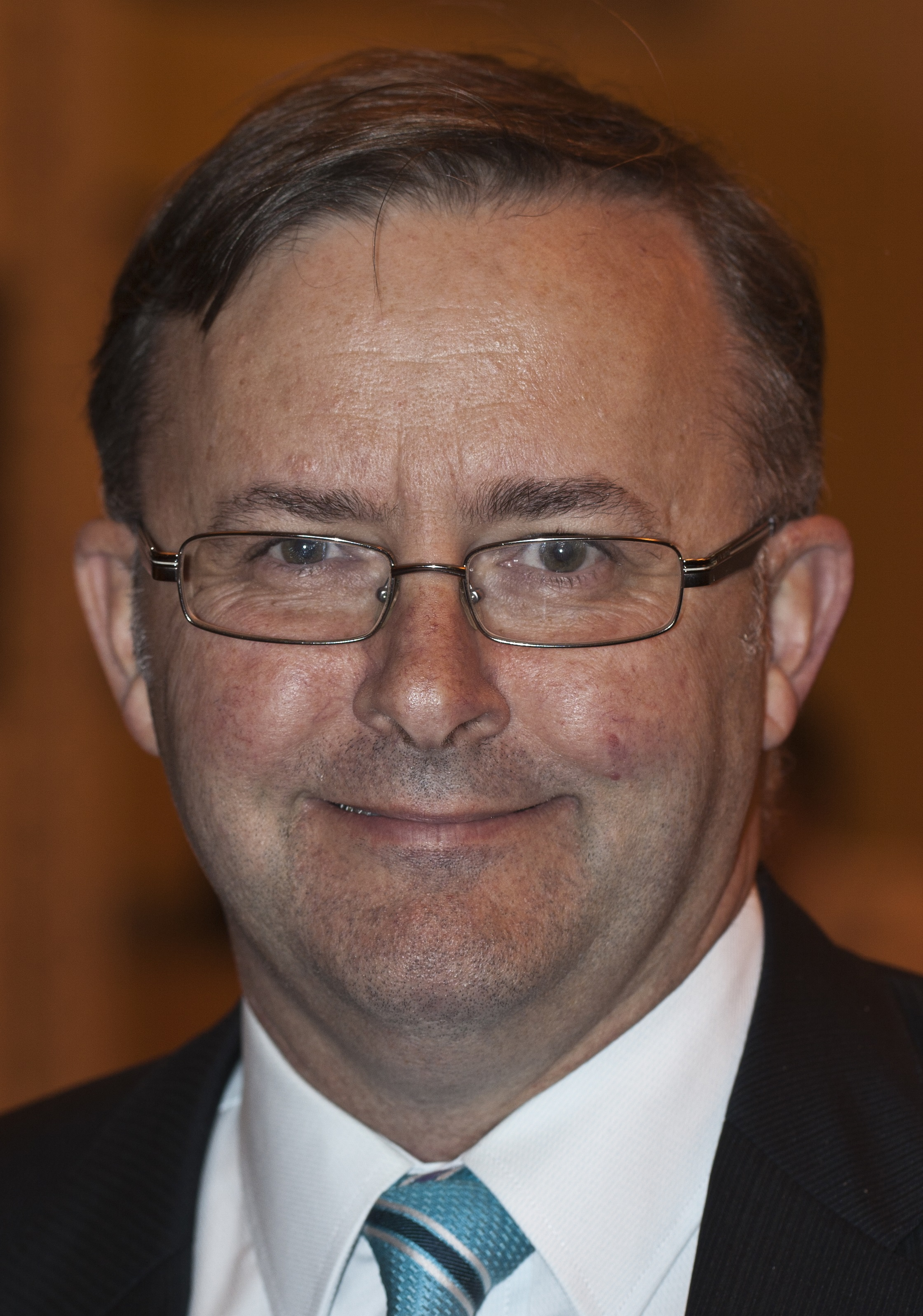
Anthony Albanese supported Rudd's bids to be re-elected as Labor leader. Albanese became Deputy Prime Minister in the second Rudd government.

In March 2013, amid criticism of Gillard's handling of media law reform proposals – called "shambolic" by a key crossbencher – Chief Whip Joel Fitzgibbon confirmed that Labor Party members were "looking at the polls and expressing concerns". On 21 March, Crean called for a spill of all leadership positions and announced that he would support Rudd for leader and would himself stand for the deputy leadership. In response, Gillard sacked Crean from Cabinet and called a leadership spill for 4.30 pm that afternoon. Just 10 minutes prior to the scheduled ballot, Rudd announced that he would not stand in the ballot, saying:

"I have said that the only circumstances under which I would consider a return to leadership would be if there was an overwhelming majority of the parliamentary party requesting such a return, drafting me to return and the position was vacant...I am here to inform you that those circumstances do not exist."

— Kevin Rudd on 14 March 2013, ten minutes prior to the scheduled ballot for the leadership spill.

=== Return of Rudd to leadership ===
Amid ongoing poor polling results for Labor, and continuing leadership rivalry, ABC journalist Barrie Cassidy triggered renewed leadership speculation on 9 June 2013 by expressing on the Insiders television programme a belief that Gillard would not lead Labor into the election. On 10 June 2013, one Labor backbencher compared the Labor Party to the Titanic. ABC News reported that "some former staunch supporters" held the view that Gillard could not win the election, and on 14 June Western Sydney Labor MP John Murphy called on Gillard to step down in favour of Rudd; On 22 June, The Age called upon Gillard to resign for the good of Labor, the nation and the democratic process, "so that vigorous, policy-driven democratic debate can flourish once again".

On 26 June 2013, with polls predicting a landslide defeat for the Gillard government in the upcoming federal election, Gillard announced another leadership spill to be held that evening, invited Rudd to challenge and proposed that the loser of the ballot retire from politics at the next election. Rudd agreed to this condition and contested the ballot, and was elected leader by 57 votes to 45.

Rudd was sworn in as prime minister by Governor-General Dame Quentin Bryce on 27 June 2013. Seven senior ministers resigned their positions, refusing to serve under Rudd, and Gillard announced her intention not to re-contest her seat at the forthcoming election. Albanese was appointed deputy prime minister, and Chris Bowen was appointed Treasurer, replacing Wayne Swan.

Labor initially enjoyed a brief resurgence in opinion polls following Rudd's return to the leadership. On 26 July, the Queensland Coroner brought down his report in relation to deaths brought about by the implementation of the first Rudd government's insulation scheme economic stimulus package. The coroner found that the deaths of three men were the result of inadequate training for the installation of the roofing insulation, and criticised the Rudd government for rushing through the pink batts program in a bid to stimulate the economy, noting "process failings" by federal agencies that led to "inadequate safeguards". The parents of a victim criticised Rudd for never apologising for his role in the scheme.

== Policy ==
=== Environment ===
Greg Combet, the Gillard government's Minister for Climate Change, resigned following the return of Rudd to the leadership, saying that as he had been a strong Gillard supporter, "It is now important that Mr Rudd has a clear opportunity to argue Labor's case and to appoint his own team to take up the fight to Tony Abbott". Soon after, he announced an intention to quit politics. Mark Butler became the new Minister for Climate Change.

==== Carbon pricing ====
In July 2013, the Rudd government announced its intention to bring forward, to July 2014, the replacement of the Gillard government's controversial carbon tax with the proposed emissions trading scheme, if re-elected. Rudd told ABC News in August that the government under his predecessor had "got it wrong" on introducing carbon tax "without mandate", saying: "I don't think our actions on the carbon tax were right. That's why I changed it and moved towards a floating price." Rudd pledged prior at the time to "terminate" the "Carbon Tax", stating it would save the average family approximately $380 annually.

=== Economy ===
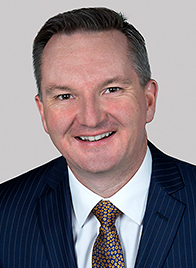
Chris Bowen became Treasurer in the second Rudd government

Wayne Swan had served as Treasurer in the first Rudd government, but resigned the post in view of the acrimonious relationship which had developed between him and Rudd over the intervening period, as did Trade Minister Craig Emerson. Rudd appointed Chris Bowen to serve as Treasurer of Australia and retained Penny Wong as Minister for Finance. Wong also assumed the position of leader of the government in the Senate, following the resignation of Gillard backer Stephen Conroy from that post.

=== Indigenous affairs ===
At the commencement of the 2007 election campaign and following John Howard's promise to call a referendum for recognition of indigenous Australians in the Australian Constitution, Rudd and Shadow Minister for Indigenous Affairs Jenny Macklin offered "bipartisan support to a commitment for constitutional recognition, regardless of the outcomes of the federal election". Two days prior to the election, Rudd told The Australian that Labor would not be proceeding with the policy "...in the first term of a Rudd Labor government, if at all". In office, the Rudd government did not pursue the issue further. The Gillard government considered, and then shelved the plan.

Following his return to the prime ministership, Rudd indicated that he had returned to supporting the initiative, in an address marking the 50th anniversary of the Yirrkala bark petitions, saying "I want this done in the next term of the Australian Parliament..." but said that the ball for this was in Opposition Leader Abbott's court, who had had to "get his act together". In response, Abbott said that Rudd was politicising the issue, as the opposition had already pledged to put forward a draft constitutional amendment for public consultation within the first 12 months, if elected.

=== Immigration ===
==== Asylum seekers ====
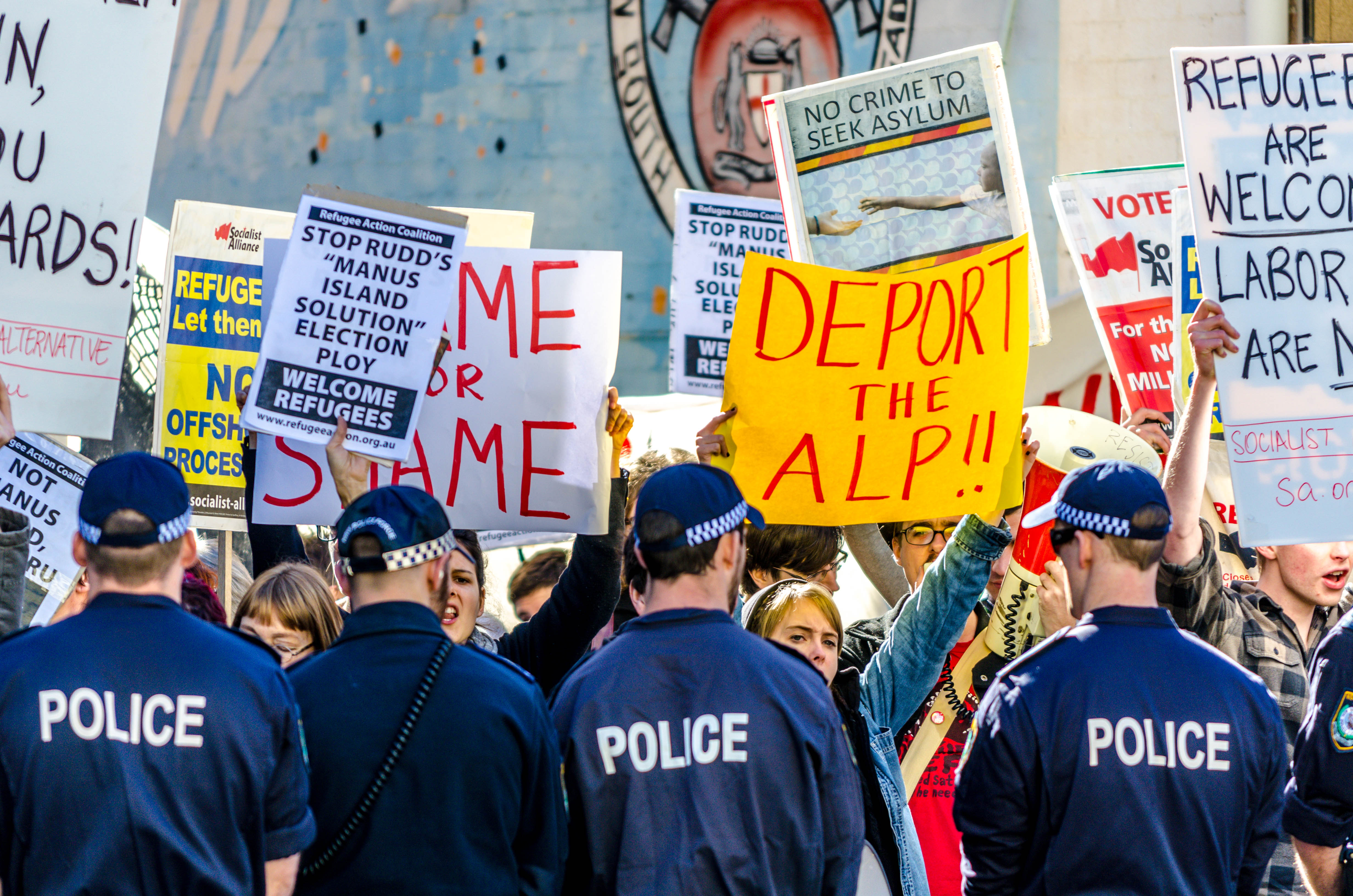
Protesters outside ALP caucus meeting in July 2013

In his second term as prime minister, Rudd renounced his opposition to offshore processing of asylum seekers in Papua New Guinea and Nauru. The flow of asylum seeker boat arrivals to Australia had re-emerged following the first Rudd government's relaxation of border controls. Following an extended period of increasing boat arrivals and deaths at sea, Gillard announced a resumption of offshore processing in August 2012. The restored Rudd shifted Labor's policy further, announcing that asylum seekers arriving in Australia by boat are not allowed to be settled in Australia.

Following talks with the prime minister of Papua New Guinea, Peter O'Neill, Rudd announced in July 2013 that all asylum seekers arriving to Australia by boat would be sent to Papua New Guinea for processing, to tackle people smuggling and refugees that seek asylum without a visa. The announcement was made by the prime minister, alongside Tony Burke and O'Neill. A new Regional Resettlement Arrangement was also signed to implement the policy. Following the announcement, detainees at the processing centre at Nauru rioted. On 5 August, Rudd announced that asylum seekers would also be processed and "resettled" on Nauru. The leader of the Australian Greens, Christine Milne, called the announcement "absurd" on the basis that the island of only 21 square kilometres (8.1 sq mi) produced virtually no food, struggles to provide fresh water and could not absorb more people.

=== Social policy ===
==== Marriage ====
Five weeks before his final challenge for the Labor leadership, Rudd reversed his previous opposition to extending the definition of marriage under Australian law to include same-sex relationships. Rudd used a blogpost on his website on 20 May 2013 to announce: "I have come to the conclusion that church and state can have different positions and practices on the question of same sex marriage. I believe the secular Australian state should be able to recognise same sex marriage." As prime minister during the 2013 Election Campaign, Rudd pledged to put a conscience vote on the issue to the Parliament within his first 100 days of office, if re-elected. He was the first serving Australian Prime Minister to indicate support for legal recognition of same-sex marriage. Asked by a New Hope Church pastor on the ABC TV program Q&A why, "as a Christian", he didn't accept the Biblical notion of marriage, Rudd replied that "Well mate if I was going to have that view, the Bible also says that slavery is a natural condition", and that his change of position on marriage was based on a good, informed Christian conscience. Rudd said that "people don't choose their sexuality" and implied that if the Bible were taken literally, slavery would still be legal. The remarks were criticised by the Glenn Davies, the Anglican Archbishop of Sydney, who said that Rudd had "misquoted the Bible and attributed to the Bible something that Aristotle said... The Bible sees slavery as the result of fallen and broken relationships in society and it is crystal clear in its condemnation of the slave trade...".

=== Education ===
Former education minister and Gillard supporter Peter Garrett resigned from Cabinet following the return of Rudd to the prime ministership, having promised prior to successive ballots that he could not serve under Rudd. Bill Shorten switched his support from Gillard to Rudd in the 2013 leadership spill and was appointed as the new Education Minister, while retaining his Workplace Relations portfolio. In July 2013 the Rudd government enacted the $15.2 billion Better Schools Plan, devised by the Gillard government in response to the Gonski Report.

== 2013 federal election ==
Approval ratings of Kevin Rudd in 2013. View source data.

On 4 August 2013, Rudd announced that he had asked the Governor-General to dissolve parliament and that an election would take place on 7 September. Kevin Rudd and Opposition Leader Tony Abbott met for three debates during the campaign: appearing at the National Press Club in Canberra on 11 August, and addressing people's forums at the Broncos Leagues Club in Brisbane on 21 August, and the Rooty Hill RSL Club in Western Sydney on 28 August. The government criticised the Liberal Opposition's costings of policies. On 30 August, Treasury Secretary Martin Parkinson and Finance Department Secretary David Tune issued a rare public statement challenging the government's claim that Treasury had found a $10 billion hole in the Opposition's policy costings, saying that any modelling used for costing policies submitted by the government before the election could not credibly be applied to opposition policies.

On 15 August, Rudd announced a plan to give consideration to creating a special company tax regime and economic zone in the Northern Territory, if re-elected. On 27 August, Rudd pledged $52 million towards a High Speed Rail Authority and other steps towards planning the construction of a $114 billion high speed rail project linking Brisbane to Melbourne by 2035. On 28 August, Rudd announced a plan to give consideration to possibly relocating the Garden Island Naval Base from Sydney to Queensland. The proposal was met with a lukewarm reception, and defence officials did not support the plan.

On the evening of the election, Rudd conceded defeat by means of a triumphal speech with a "beaming smile". Rudd spoke to a jubilant crowd for over 20 minutes, said "Bill Glasson eat your heart out" (in reference to his local opponent in the seat of Griffith) and declared "I'm proud that despite all the prophets of doom, that we have preserved our federal parliamentary Labor Party as a viable fighting force for the future". Abbott's Liberals and their coalition partner, the Nationals, led by Warren Truss, achieved a 3.65 percent two-party swing, winning 90 of the seats in the House of Representatives to Labor's 55.

== Aftermath ==
On the night of the election, Rudd announced that he would remain in Parliament as the Member for Griffith, but not seek to be elected Labor's next leader. Outgoing ministers Craig Emerson and Nicola Roxon called on Rudd to resign from Parliament for the good of the Labor Party, predicting that his ongoing presence would be destabilising. Emerson predicted that Rudd would stand for the leadership again, and said that he had sabotaged Labor's 2010 election campaign with leaks and that "Anyone who does that, who is so hellbent on revenge, who is so destructive as to depress the Labor vote in the 2010 election shouldn't be rewarded for that sort of behaviour". In a scathing address in Parliament on 16 October, Roxon said that Rudd's replacement in 2010 had been an "act of political bastardry", but one which was justified because Rudd had been "a bastard himself to so many people".

Under new leadership election rules instigated during the Second Rudd government, Labor allowed its parliamentary caucus, and – in a new initiative – its general membership to share a 50/50 split of the vote for parliamentary leader. On 13 October Bill Shorten was elected to lead the opposition, with 64% of the caucus vote, defeating Anthony Albanese who obtained 60% of the general membership vote.

On 22 November Rudd formally tendered his resignation to the Speaker of the House of Representatives.

== See also ==
- June 2013 Australian Labor Party leadership spill
- Rudd government (2007–2010)
- Second Rudd ministry
