= Rudd government =

Rudd Government may refer to two Australian governments:

- Rudd government (2007–2010)
- Rudd government (2013)

== See also ==
- Rudd ministry (disambiguation)
