= Rudd ministry =

Rudd ministry may refer to:

- First Rudd ministry (2007–2010)
- Second Rudd ministry (June–September 2013)

== See also ==
- Rudd government (disambiguation)
