= 2012 Australian Labor Party leadership spill =

- 27 February 2012
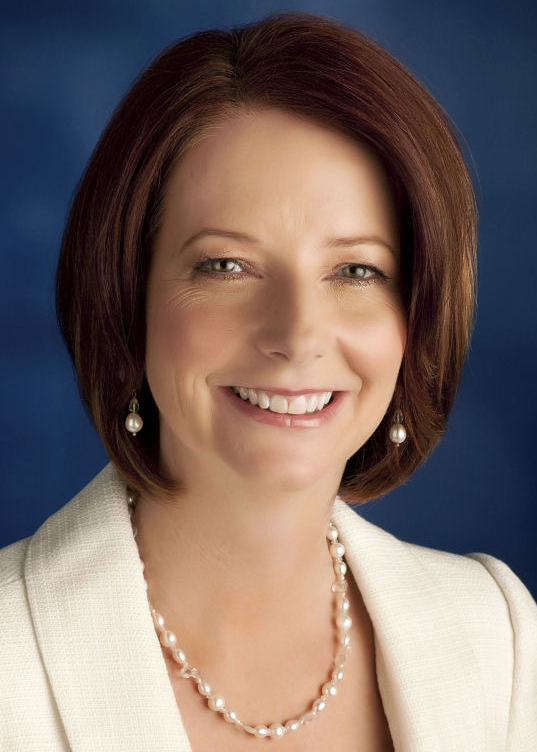

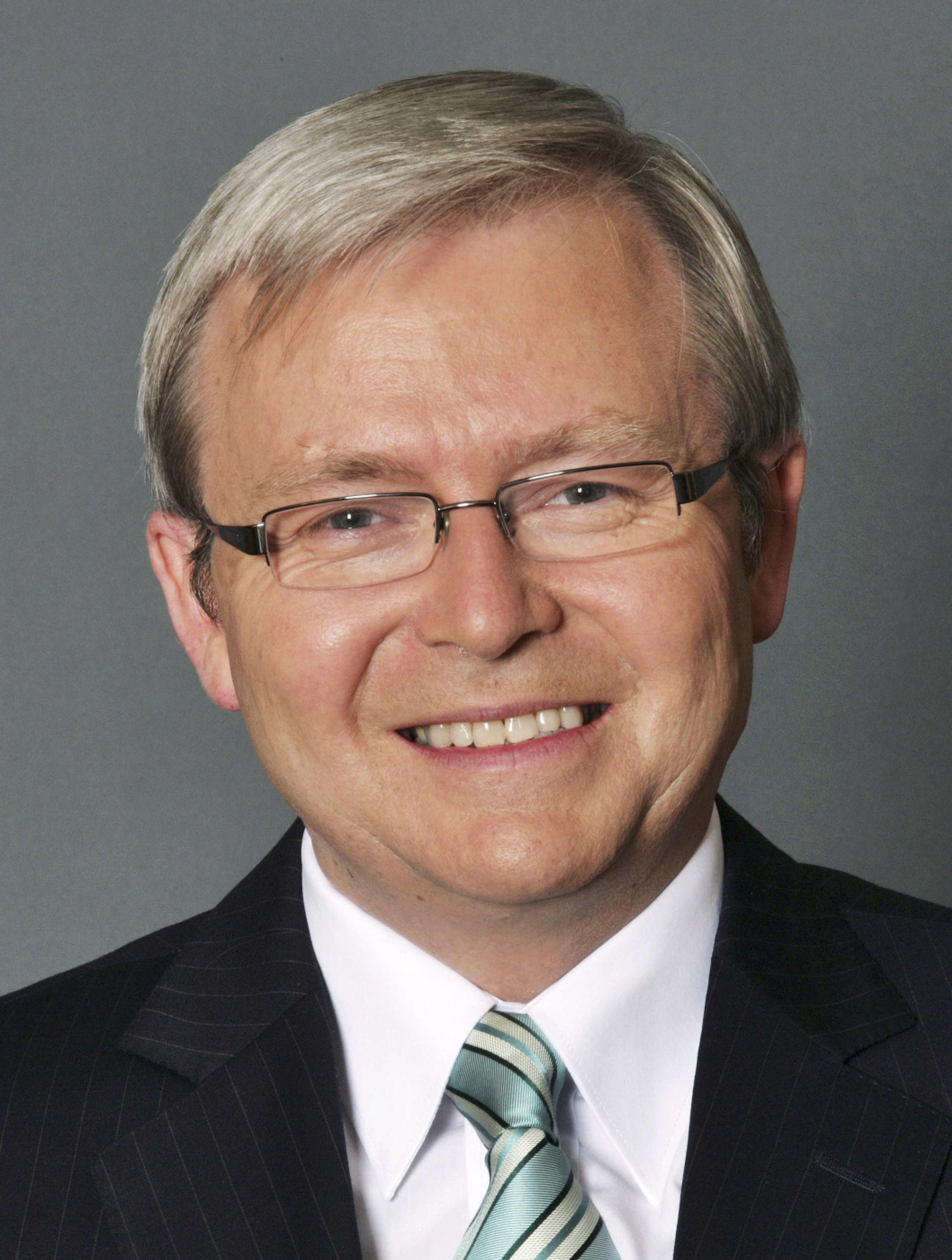
Candidate	Julia Gillard	Kevin Rudd
Caucus vote	71	31
Percentage	69.6%	30.4%
Seat	Lalor (VIC)	Griffith (QLD)
Faction	Left	Right
Leader before election
Julia Gillard
Elected Leader
Julia Gillard

A leadership spill in the Australian Labor Party, the party of government in the Parliament of Australia, was held on 27 February 2012 at 10 am AEDT, followed by a ballot. The Prime Minister, Julia Gillard, announced the spill at a press conference on 23 February 2012, following the resignation of the Minister for Foreign Affairs, Kevin Rudd, from his cabinet position after months of speculation that he intended to challenge Gillard for the leadership. Rudd announced his intention to seek the leadership at a press conference on 24 February.

At the leadership ballot, Gillard won by a vote of 71 to 31.

== Background ==
Kevin Rudd led the Labor Party to a landslide victory at the 2007 federal election, becoming Prime Minister on 3 December. On the same day, Julia Gillard was appointed as Deputy Prime Minister.

On 23 June 2010 Gillard publicly requested that Rudd call a leadership election for the following day. Despite declaring that he would stand in the election at a press conference, it quickly became apparent that Rudd did not have the necessary support to remain in his position. Hours before the vote on 24 June, Rudd resigned as Prime Minister and Leader of the Labor Party, allowing Gillard to assume both offices unopposed.

Gillard announced a snap election to be held on 21 August 2010 but, despite Labor leading the polls at the start of the campaign, the result was the first hung parliament since 1940. In the days following the election, Gillard successfully negotiated the support of one Green MP and three Independent MPs in order to allow Labor to rule as a minority government. The Second Gillard Ministry was sworn in on 14 September 2010 by Governor-General Quentin Bryce, with Rudd accepting an offer from Gillard to become Minister for Foreign Affairs.

For several months, beginning in September 2011, many stories and opinion pieces began to appear in the press speculating that Rudd intended to challenge Gillard for the leadership, although it was generally believed that his support in the Labor Party was relatively low and hence a challenge would be unsuccessful. Rudd denied these rumours publicly, stating that he was happy being Foreign Minister and that Gillard had his full support as prime minister. By February 2012, it was suggested by some journalists that Rudd himself had been giving "background briefings" in his office to the press. Several senior ministers, including Simon Crean, reacted to this by openly accusing Rudd of disloyalty, demanding that Gillard sack him.

On 22 February 2012 Rudd, who had been on government business overseas, gave a press conference from the Willard Hotel in Washington, D.C. announcing his resignation as Minister for Foreign Affairs, citing the attacks on him by Crean and others he described as "faceless men" within the party, as well as Gillard's unwillingness to condemn the attacks when given the opportunity. He said he would return to Australia the following day and consult with family and parliamentary colleagues before announcing his next move. A number of senior ministers spoke to the press later that evening attacking Rudd, while Bruce Hawker and Senator Doug Cameron gave interviews supporting Rudd. Rudd himself held a second press conference the following morning, outlining his policy vision for Australia and saying that he wished to "save" Australia from a Tony Abbott-led government. Rudd stated, "I do not believe that Prime Minister Gillard can lead the Australian Labor Party to success in the next election."

In response to these developments, Gillard called a news conference in Adelaide on 23 February, at which she announced that a spill of leadership positions would be held at 10.00am on Monday 27 February, at which she would re-nominate herself as Labor Leader. She strongly defended her performance as prime minister, citing her health agreement between the states, the structural separation of Telstra vital to the implementation of the National Broadband Network and, as achievements, noted that these had not been achieved under Rudd's leadership. Gillard stated that if she was defeated by Rudd in the ballot, she would retire to the backbenches and renounce any further claims to the leadership.

In their initial responses to the announcement, senior ministers launched stinging attacks on Rudd's legacy as prime minister. Deputy Prime Minister Wayne Swan criticised Rudd as "dysfunctional"; Tony Burke said of Rudd's term in office that "the stories that were around of the chaos, of the temperament, of the inability to have decisions made, they are not stories"; Nicola Roxon declared she could not work with Rudd again; and Stephen Conroy said that Rudd had had "contempt" for his colleagues, the Parliament and the public. Ministers Tanya Plibersek, Stephen Smith, Bill Shorten and Greg Combet were more circumspect, but also declared their support for Gillard. Senator Doug Cameron and Immigration Minister Chris Bowen came out in support of Rudd and called on their colleagues to show him respect. Ministers Robert McClelland and Martin Ferguson also declared for Rudd, saying that they didn't believe Gillard would win against Tony Abbott. Minister Kim Carr also declared for Rudd. Labor MP Nick Champion resigned as caucus secretary in order to back Rudd.

Gillard portrayed Rudd's time as Prime Minister as "chaotic and dysfunctional" and implied that he viewed the ballot process as "an episode of Celebrity Big Brother". Rudd called for "people power" to support his challenge for the leadership, as well as accusing Gillard of betraying him in 2010 and questioning her trustworthiness.

Prior to the vote, Rudd promised that if he lost he would initiate no further challenges against Gillard, although he did not rule out being drafted as Labor Leader at any later date.

== Caucus support ==
102 of the 103 members of the Labor caucus from the House of Representatives and the Senate were eligible to vote, with 52 votes needed to win. Several ministers and members of the Labor caucus publicly stated ahead of time who they intended to support in the event of a ballot. Michelle Rowland was not able to vote as she was on maternity leave but had made it known that she would have voted for Prime Minister Gillard.

Public supporters of Gillard:
- Mark Arbib, Minister for Small Business and Minister for Sport
- Catryna Bilyk, Senator for Tasmania
- Sharon Bird, MP for Cunningham, New South Wales
- Julie Collins, Minister for Community Services, Minister for Indigenous Employment and Economic Development, and Minister for the Status of Women
- David Bradbury, Parliamentary Secretary to the Treasurer
- Gai Brodtmann, MP for Canberra, ACT
- Tony Burke, Minister for Sustainability, Environment, Water, Population and Communities
- Mark Butler, Minister for Mental Health and Ageing
- Jason Clare, Minister for Justice and Minister for Home Affairs
- Jacinta Collins, Parliamentary Secretary for School Education and Workplace Relations
- Julie Collins, Parliamentary Secretary for Community Services
- Stephen Conroy, Minister for Broadband, Communications and the Digital Economy
- Simon Crean, Minister for Regional Australia, Regional Development and Local Government
- Craig Emerson, Minister for Trade
- Peter Garrett, Minister for School Education, Early Childhood and Youth
- Gary Gray, Special Minister of State
- Stephen Jones, MP for Throsby, New South Wales
- Andrew Leigh, MP for Fraser, ACT
- Kate Lundy, Senator for the Australian Capital Territory
- Jenny Macklin, Minister for Families, Community Services and Indigenous Affairs
- Rob Mitchell, MP for McEwen, Victoria
- Brendan O'Connor, Minister for Human Services
- Tanya Plibersek, Minister for Health
- Nicola Roxon, Attorney-General
- Bill Shorten, Minister for Financial Services and Superannuation and Minister for Employment and Workplace Relations
- Sid Sidebottom, MP for Braddon, Tasmania
- Lisa Singh, Senator for Tasmania
- Stephen Smith, Minister for Defence
- Wayne Swan, Treasurer, Deputy Prime Minister and Deputy Leader of Australian Labor Party
- Penny Wong, Minister for Finance and Deregulation
Public supporters of Rudd:
- Anthony Albanese, Minister for Infrastructure and Transport and Leader of the House of Representatives
- Chris Bowen, Minister for Immigration and Citizenship
- Mark Bishop, Senator for Western Australia
- Anthony Byrne, MP for Holt, Victoria
- Doug Cameron, Senator for New South Wales
- Kim Carr, Minister for Manufacturing and Defence Materiel
- Nick Champion, MP for Wakefield, South Australia
- Darren Cheeseman, MP for Corangamite, Victoria
- Martin Ferguson, Minister for Resources and Energy and Minister for Tourism
- Alan Griffin, MP for Bruce, Victoria
- Ed Husic MP for Chifley, New South Wales
- Mike Kelly, MP for Eden-Monaro, NSW
- Robert McClelland, Minister for Social Housing and Homelessness
- Janelle Saffin, MP for Page, New South Wales
- Ursula Stephens, Senator for New South Wales

== Result ==
Gillard overwhelmingly defeated Rudd in the leadership ballot, by 71 votes to 31. Rudd returned to the backbenches as he had promised, and pledged his loyalty to Gillard until the next election. Rudd's strategist, Bruce Hawker, left open the possibility of Rudd being drafted as Leader in an emergency situation if Gillard's polling did not improve.

Following the vote, Senator Mark Arbib, a factional leader and a key backer of Gillard in 2010, announced that he would be resigning in order to help the party "heal" in the wake of the leadership dispute. Gillard described the events leading up to the ballot as "ugly" but said that the leadership issue was now "determined".

Despite winning 31 votes, Rudd was estimated to have as high as 45 votes although Gillard supporters said it was lower, prior to Gillard calling the spill.

== See also ==
- 2010 Australian Labor Party leadership spill
- March 2013 Australian Labor Party leadership spill
- June 2013 Australian Labor Party leadership spill
