= David Feeney =

Australian politician (born 1970)

The Honourable David Feeney
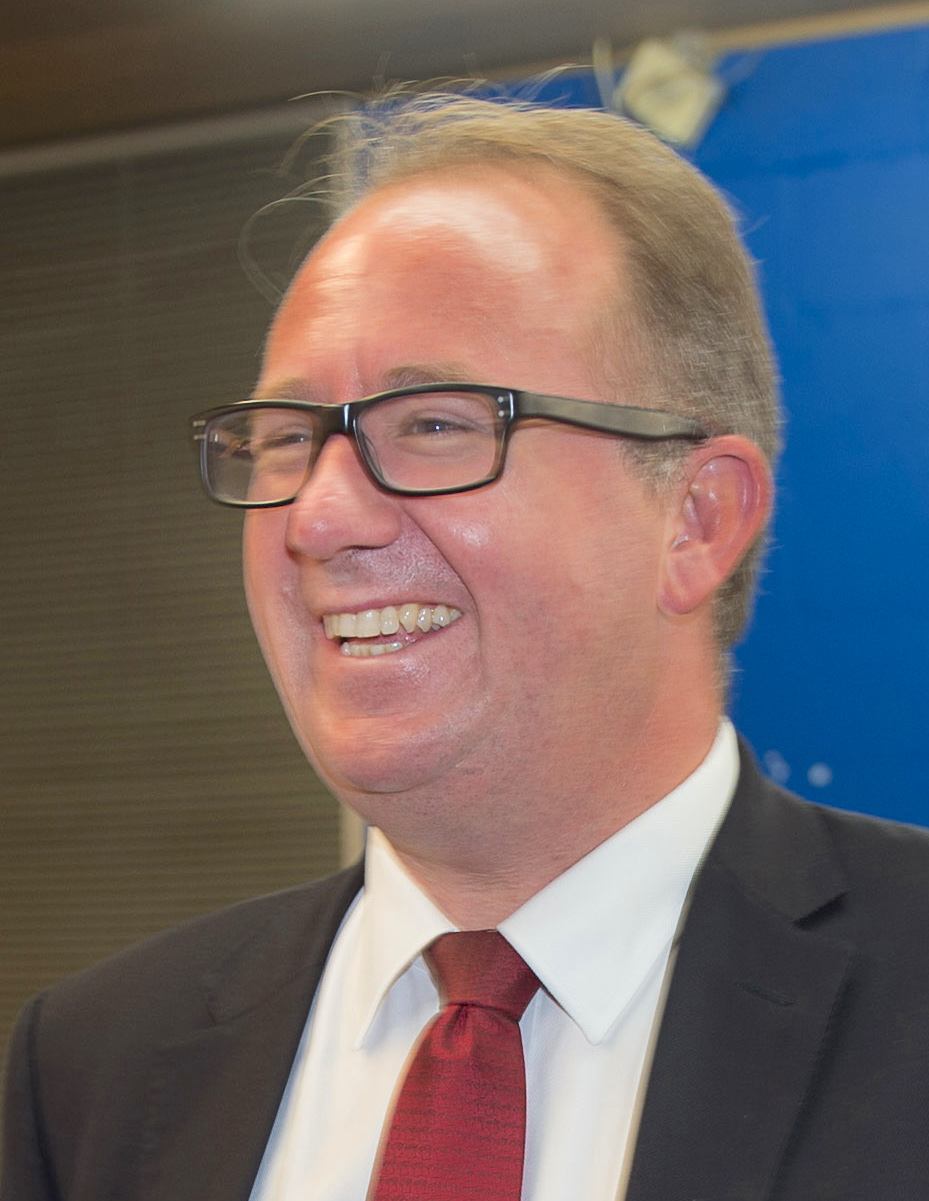

Member of the Australian Parliament for Batman
- In office 7 September 2013 – 1 February 2018
- Preceded by: Martin Ferguson
- Succeeded by: Ged Kearney

Senator for Victoria
- In office 1 July 2008 – 12 August 2013
- Succeeded by: Mehmet Tillem

Personal details
- Born: David Ian Feeney; 5 March 1970 (age 56) Adelaide, South Australia
- Party: Labor
- Spouse: Liberty Sanger
- Children: 2
- Education: Monash University; University of Melbourne
- Occupation: Union official

David Ian Feeney (born 5 March 1970) is an Australian former politician. He was the Labor member for the division of Batman in the House of Representatives from 7 September 2013 to 1 February 2018. Before that, he was a member of the Australian Senate for Victoria from 2008 until his resignation to contest Batman. Feeney resigned as a member of Parliament on 1 February 2018 as he was unable to produce any documentary evidence disproving he was a dual citizen, which is a breach of section 44 of the Constitution of Australia.

== Background and early career ==
Feeney was born in Adelaide, South Australia in 1970, his father having emigrated from Belfast, Northern Ireland. Raised as a Roman Catholic, Feeney attended Mercedes College, Adelaide, before moving to Melbourne in 1987, where he attended the University of Melbourne. He later completed post-graduate study at Monash University, with a Masters in Public Policy and Management (MPPM).

Feeney worked in the National Office of the Transport Workers Union (TWU) as a Federal Industrial Officer from 1994 to 1999. At the TWU, Feeney served as a union advocate before the Australian Industrial Relations Commission (AIRC).

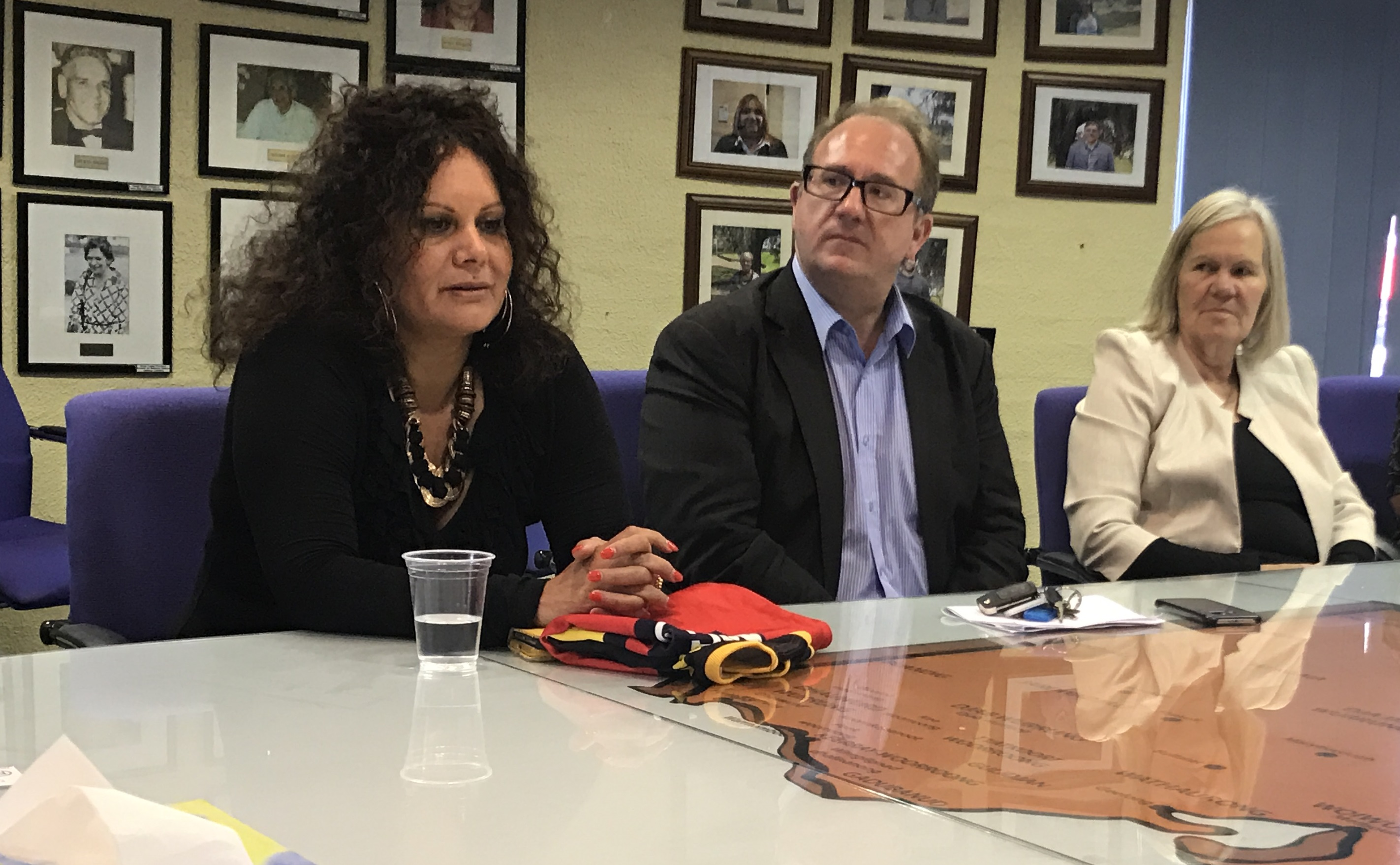
Feeney speaking with local constituents

Feeney served as Victorian State Secretary of the Labor Party and State Labor Campaign Director from March 1999 to December 2002, where he had considerable success as a fund-raiser and campaign director. At the 2002 state election, Victorian Labor won 20 seats, holding 62 seats in the parliament of 88—the largest majority in Victorian history. Following that election, he joined the private staff of Premier Steve Bracks as his Director of Strategy.

In 2005, Feeney returned to his home state of South Australia to become Labor's Assistant National Secretary and campaign director for SA Labor at the March 2006 state election. Feeney helped SA Labor win six seats previously held by the opposition Liberal Party.

Feeney served as Assistant National Secretary and Deputy National Campaign Director of the Australian Labor Party between 2005 and June 2008.

== Political career ==
=== Senate ===
In March 2006, Feeney was placed third on the Australian Senate from Victoria ballot paper as the Labor Party's candidate. Winning against lead candidate from the Australian Greens, Richard Di Natale, Feeney entered the Senate on 1 July 2008.

During his period in the Senate, he sat on the Senate Select Committee on Climate Policy.

In 2010, Feeney was one of the key MPs (along with Bill Shorten, Mark Arbib, and Don Farrell) who convinced their colleagues to support Julia Gillard in calling for a leadership spill against sitting prime minister Kevin Rudd. When Gillard was sworn in as prime minister, Feeney was appointed as Parliamentary Secretary for Defence in her first ministry, and was reappointed to this role in the second Gillard ministry. He maintained this position in the reshuffle when Rudd regained the Prime Ministership in June 2013.

As Parliamentary Secretary, Feeney commissioned the report into Unresolved Recognition for Past Acts of Naval and Military Gallantry and Valour, and was responsible for the Australian Government's Defence Honours and Awards Appeals Tribunal.

His responsibilities included ADF Reserves, ADF force structure (especially Plan BEERSHEBA in the Army), the Pacific Maritime Security Plan (PMSP) and liaison with Pacific Island Countries, participating in the first meeting of South Pacific Defence Ministers Meeting (SPDMM) in Tonga. Feeney also commissioned the Department of Defence workforce review, known as Plan Suakin, in 2010.

=== House of Representatives ===
Feeney was elected as the member for Batman in 2013, succeeding the retired Martin Ferguson. His switch to nominating for the House of Representatives came after he was preselected to the third spot on the Victorian Senate ticket. Although it was the same ticket position from which he had been elected in 2007, the state of Labor's polling in 2013 made the prospects of holding his Senate seat unlikely, with Feeney admitting that this made his position in the Senate, "very, very marginal."

At the 2013 election Labor Leader Bill Shorten appointed Feeney as Shadow Minister for Justice and Shadow Assistant Minister for Defence. After 1 July 2014 the portfolio of Veterans Affairs and Centenary of ANZAC were added to his responsibilities. As a local MP, Feeney campaigned for schools funding, healthcare and public transport. He also worked to promote the Anzac Centenary in his Batman electorate, and to secure grants for local projects to commemorate the service of Australian service-men and women in the First World War.

Feeney sought to promote causes in parliament including recognition of same-sex marriage, needs-based school funding, and various environmental concerns, particularly marine parks and fisheries protection. In 2017, Feeney was one of a small number of Labor MPs to express opposition to the Carmichael coal mine proposed by the Adani Group, saying the project didn't "stack up" and calling the cost to the environment and climate "too high".

Feeney is a regular commentator on strategic and defence matters, was a regular contributor to ADM magazine, and Deputy Chair of the Defence sub-committee of the Joint Standing Committee of Defence, Foreign Affairs and Trade (JSCDFAT). He also served as a contributing author to 'The Long Road': Australia's train, advice and assist mission and Australia's American Alliance: Towards a New Era?

David Feeney was keenly interested in the Australian Antarctic Territory, commenting on its importance to Australia's strategic outlook and travelling there in 2017.

At the 2016 federal election the Australian Greens focused their campaign effort against several inner urban electorates with sitting Labor MPs, including Feeney's seat of Batman. Feeney attracted controversy when it was revealed he had failed to disclose an investment property he owned in Northcote (valued at $2.3 million) on the Parliamentary Register of Interests. While Feeney claimed that he had gained no financial advantage from his mistake, accusations that he had "forgotten his house" caused significant damage to his re-election campaign, which had focused on Labor's policy to abolish negative gearing. His campaign in Batman was described by the Herald Sun as "tumultuous", with Feeney also leaving confidential Labor briefing notes in a TV studio after an interview on Sky News. On 2 July 2016, Feeney was narrowly re-elected with 51.03% of the two-candidate-preferred vote against the Greens.

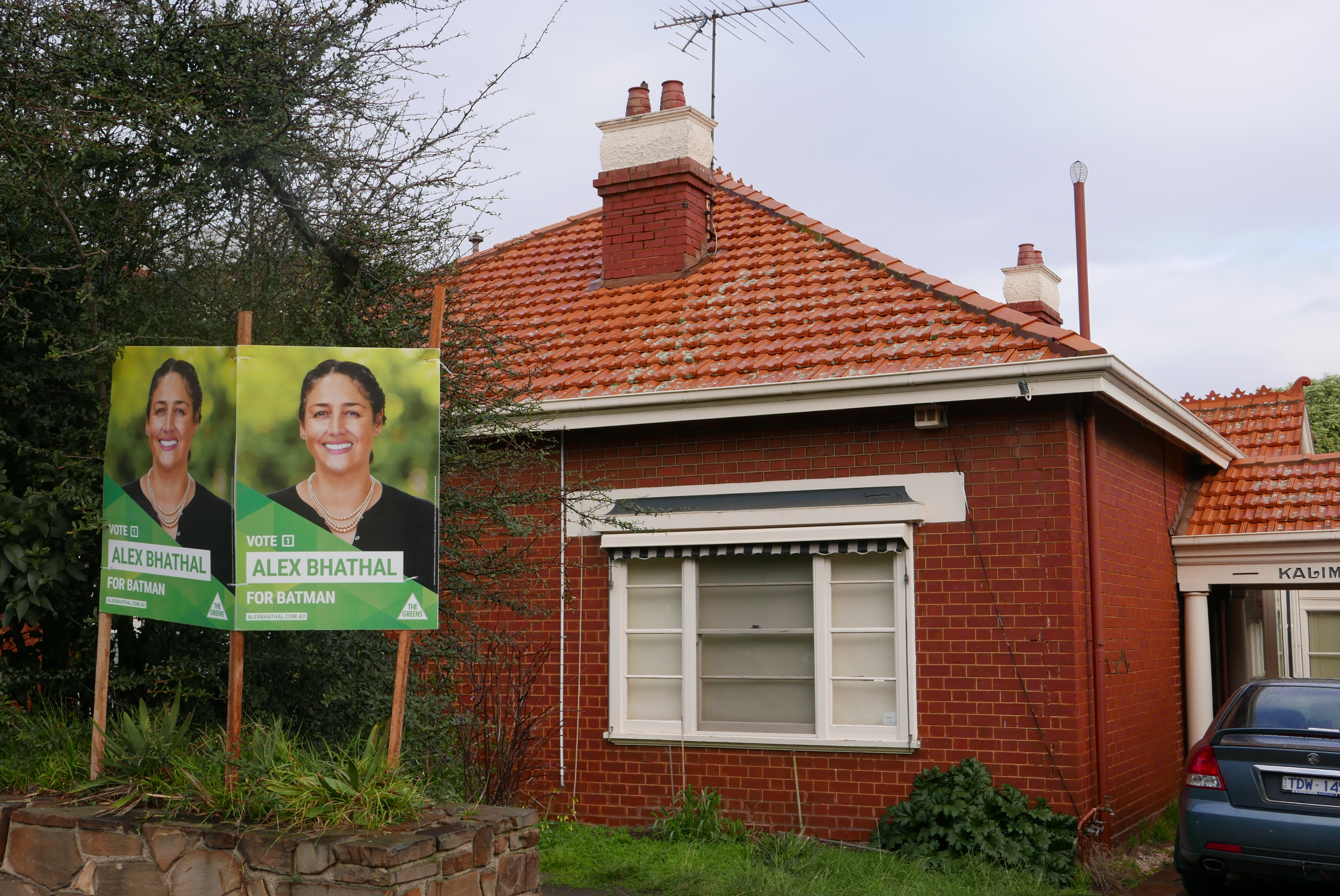
David Feeney's $2.3 million house in Northcote not declared on his parliamentary register of interests

Feeney was referred to the High Court of Australia on 6 December 2017, over concerns he was in breach of section 44 of the Australian Constitution. Feeney claimed he had taken the steps required of him to relinquish any British and Irish citizenship by descent in 2007, but was unable to produce documentation confirming the British renunciation had taken place.

On 1 February 2018, accordingly, Feeney announced his resignation as a member of Parliament, and revealed he would not stand as a candidate for the Batman by-election later that year.

== Career after politics ==
Feeney was appointed a Senior Fellow to the Australian Strategic Policy Institute (ASPI) in August 2018. He has served as a regular guest lecturer at the Australian War College in Canberra since 2018. In 2019, he was appointed to the advisory board of NIOA.

In December 2018, Feeney wrote a paper advocating for Australia's need to develop a comprehensive grand strategy for the Centre of Gravity journal of the Strategic and Defence Studies Centre of the Australian National University (ANU). In 2021, Feeney wrote a further paper for Centre of Gravity entitled "SEA 5000 Future Frigate program: continuous shipbuilding under the spotlight".

Since 2019, Feeney has been a postgraduate student at the University of Melbourne. In 2020 he completed a Graduate Diploma in Arts (Advanced). His thesis entitled Second Punic War: the contest for the central Mediterranean, Hannibal and Carthaginian grand strategy 218–210 BC won the 2020 William Culican Memorial Award. In 2021, Feeney commenced PhD studies in classical and ancient studies. In October 2021 David Feeney became a Graduate Member of the Australian Institute of Company Directors.

== Personal life ==
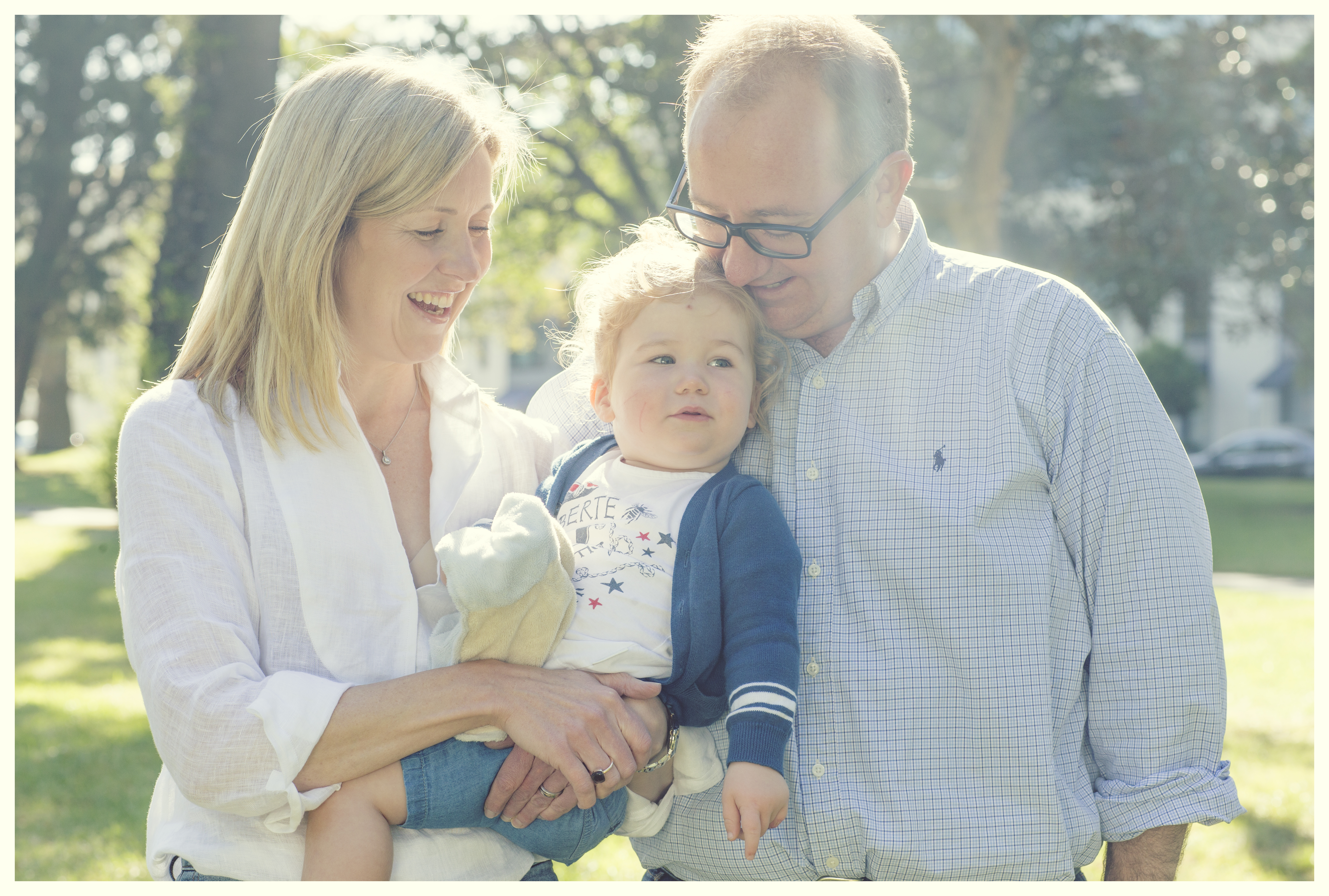
Feeney, Sanger and son

Feeney is married to Liberty Sanger, The current Victorian Coroner, County Court Judge and former principal of law firm Maurice Blackburn. They have a son, Ned (2014), and a daughter, Matilda (2019).

Parliament of Australia
Preceded by Martin Ferguson	Member for Batman; 2013–2018	Succeeded by Ged Kearney
