= March 2013 Australian Labor Party leadership spill =

March 2013 Australian Labor Party Leadership spill
- 21 March 2013
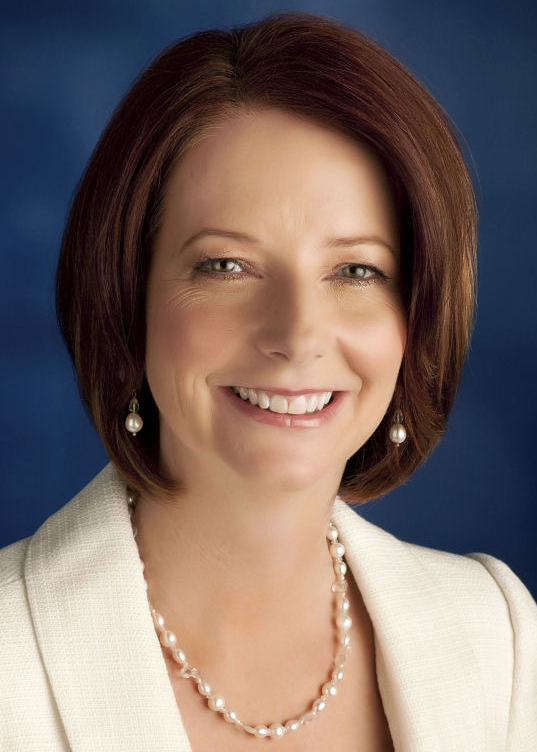
Candidate	Julia Gillard
Caucus vote	Unopposed
Seat	Lalor (VIC)
Faction	Left
Leader before election
Julia Gillard
Elected Leader
Julia Gillard

A leadership spill in the Australian Labor Party, the party of government in the Parliament of Australia, was held on 21 March 2013. Prime Minister Julia Gillard called a ballot for the Leadership and Deputy Leadership of the Labor Party for 4.30pm, following a press conference by former Labor Leader and Regional Minister Simon Crean over persistent leadership tensions. At the caucus meeting, no alternative candidates nominated for the positions, and so Gillard and Wayne Swan were re-elected unopposed.

== Background ==
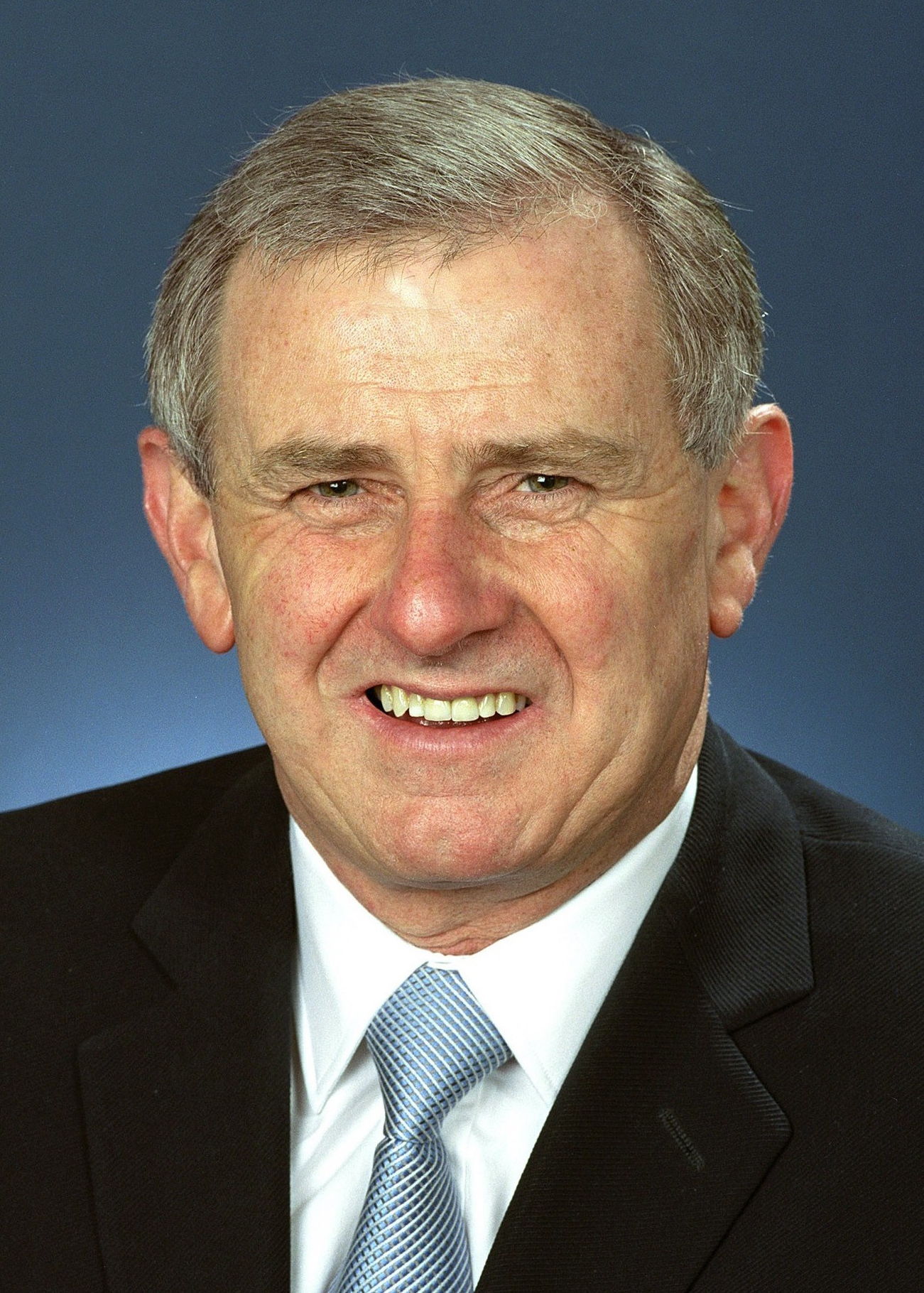
Simon Crean called on Gillard to resign, and was subsequently sacked from Cabinet.

Despite the 2012 leadership spill, at which Gillard easily defeated former Leader Kevin Rudd, tensions continued to be high within the Gillard government. According to Peter Hartcher, "After more than two and a half years of consistently being in a losing position in the Nielsen poll, the great bulk of Labor MPs did not believe the government could win the election that Gillard had called for 14 September." Whenever challenged by interviewers, Rudd repeatedly said that he would not challenge Gillard for the leadership again. However, he and his supporters reportedly continued to campaign privately for his return to the leadership behind the scenes.

Ministers and backbenchers began to lose confidence in Gillard's leadership and political judgment following the naming of an election date over seven months early, a promotional tour of Western Sydney and her "captain's pick" which replaced long-serving Northern Territory Senator (and Rudd ally) Trish Crossin with Nova Peris, interrupting an ongoing preselection. A cabinet reshuffle was required following the unexpected departures of ministers Chris Evans and Nicola Roxon, and the New South Wales branch of the party was constantly in the news due to revelations from the Independent Commission Against Corruption (ICAC) mainly involving ex-state ministers Eddie Obeid and Ian Macdonald. During this time, the Australian Greens also withdrew from their agreement supporting the minority government.

After the Western Australian state election on 9 March, two federal ministers from the state conceded that the Gillard government's troubles had impacted on the result. Former state minister Alannah MacTiernan reported a consistent message from voters at doorstops that they would not vote for federal Labor later in the year, and called for Gillard to accept that she could not win an election and to stand down.

Later in March, amid criticism of Gillard's handling of media law reform proposals—called "shambolic" by a key crossbencher—Chief Whip Joel Fitzgibbon confirmed that Labor Party members were "looking at the polls and expressing concerns". On 21 March at 1pm AEDST, former Labor leader Simon Crean called for a spill of all leadership positions and announced that he would support Kevin Rudd for leader and would himself stand for the deputy leadership. He was critical of Gillard and her deputy Wayne Swan for not communicating effectively with voters. In response, Gillard sacked Crean from Cabinet and called a leadership spill for 4.30pm AEDST that afternoon. Just 10 minutes prior to the scheduled ballot, Rudd announced that he would not stand in the ballot, saying:

I have said that the only circumstances under which I would consider a return to leadership would be if there was an overwhelming majority of the parliamentary party requesting such a return, drafting me to return and the position was vacant...I am here to inform you that those circumstances do not exist.

== Result ==
Of the 102 members of the ALP caucus, 100 were able to vote, with Foreign Minister Bob Carr and Tasmanian MP Dick Adams unable to vote as they were overseas or heading overseas. Julia Gillard and Wayne Swan were the only nominators in the spill for the positions of Leader and Deputy Leader respectively; as a result, no vote was undertaken and they retained their positions unopposed. Aside from post-election meetings, this was the first time in the history of the Labor Party that an incumbent leader was elected unopposed at a leadership ballot.

== Aftermath ==
Crean was sacked as Minister for Regional Australia, Regional Development and Local Government and Minister for the Arts prior to the ballot. After the ballot, Chief Government Whip Joel Fitzgibbon resigned, as did two other government whips Ed Husic and Janelle Saffin, who had rallied in support of Kevin Rudd. Parliamentary secretary Richard Marles also resigned that evening. Ministers Chris Bowen, Kim Carr, and Martin Ferguson resigned the following day. Crean criticised Rudd for not nominating. Journalist Niki Savva writing the following day in The Australian that "there has never been such an inept attempt to dislodge a leader".

Rudd subsequently issued a statement that he would never again return to the ALP leadership. However, he returned to the ALP leadership later the same year in another leadership spill in June.

== See also ==
- 2010 Australian Labor Party leadership spill
- 2012 Australian Labor Party leadership spill
- June 2013 Australian Labor Party leadership spill
