= June 2013 Australian Labor Party leadership spill =

- 26 June 2013
- Leadership election
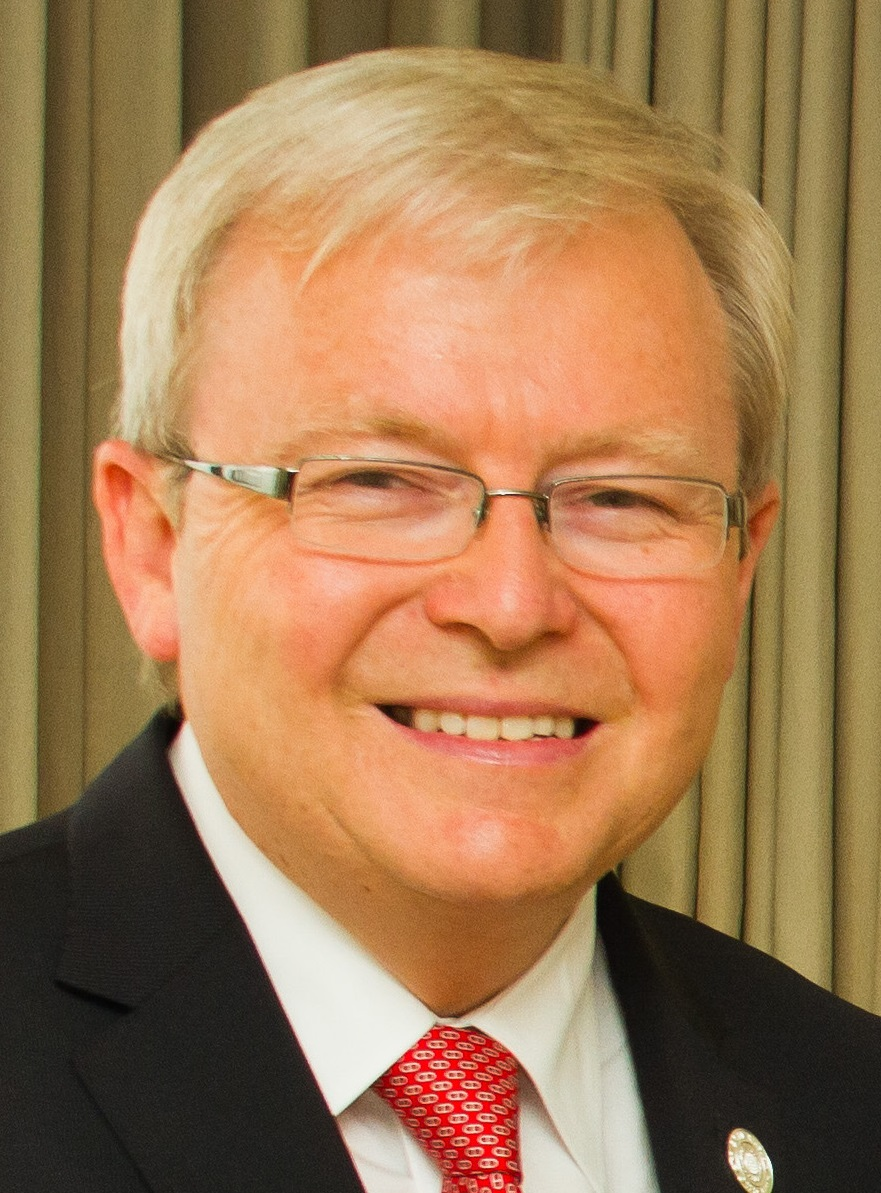

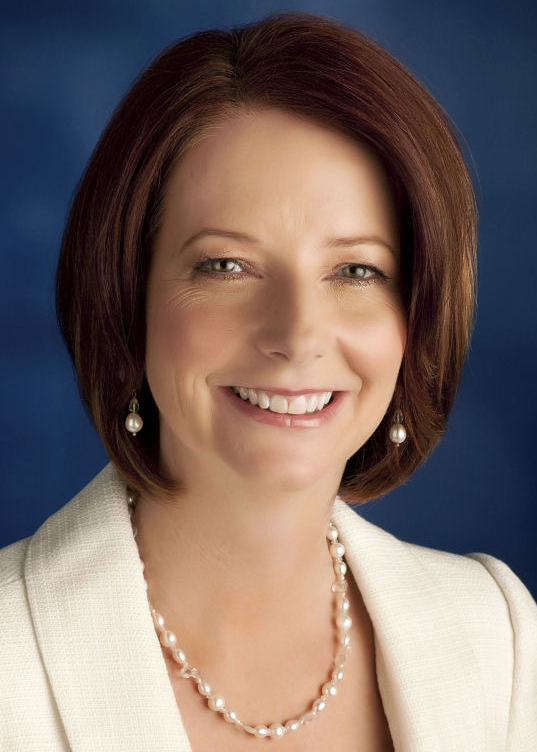
Candidate	Kevin Rudd	Julia Gillard
Caucus vote	57	45
Percentage	55.9%	44.1%
Seat	Griffith (QLD)	Lalor (VIC)
Faction	Right	Left
Leader before election
Julia Gillard
Elected Leader
Kevin Rudd
- Deputy leadership election
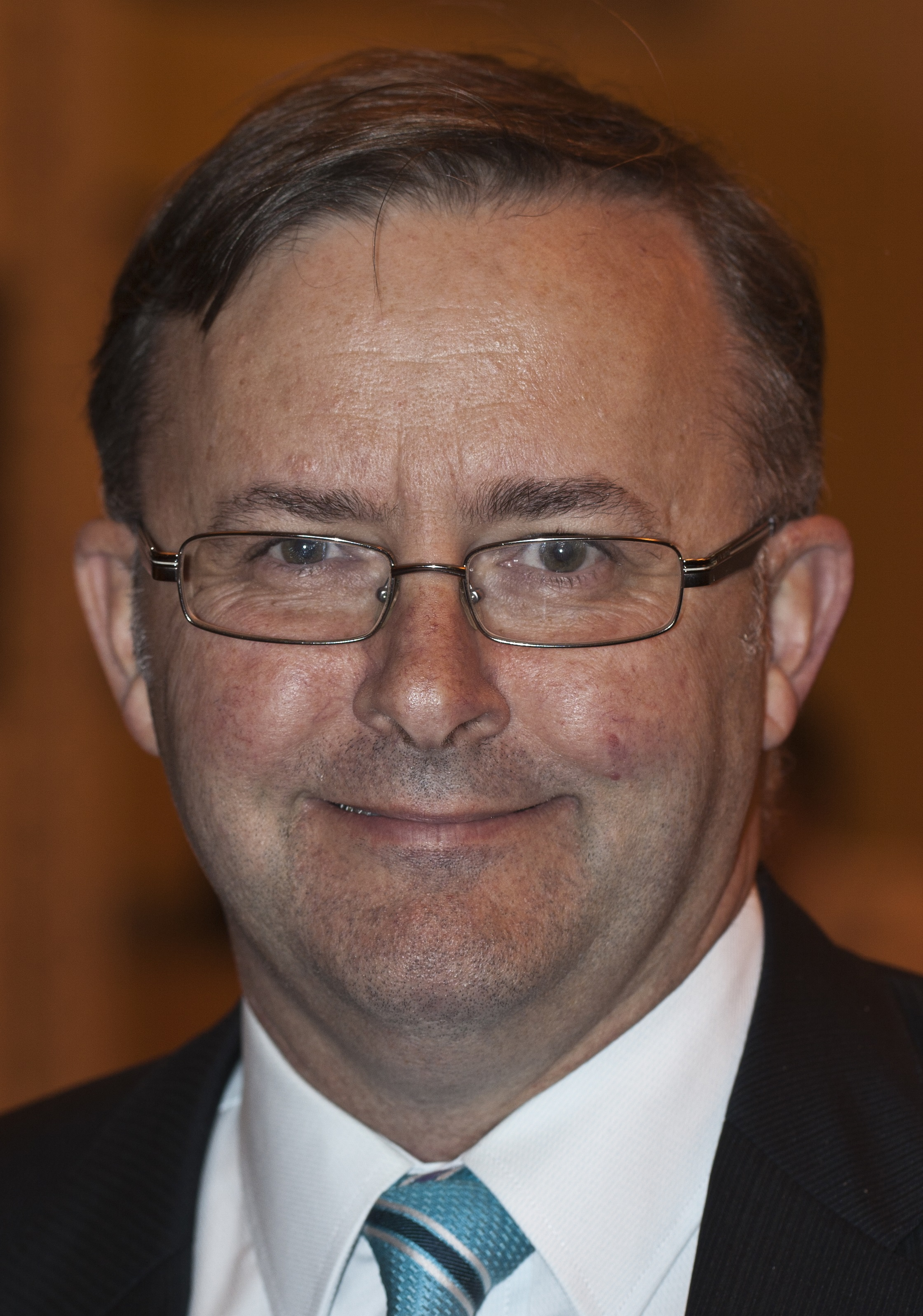

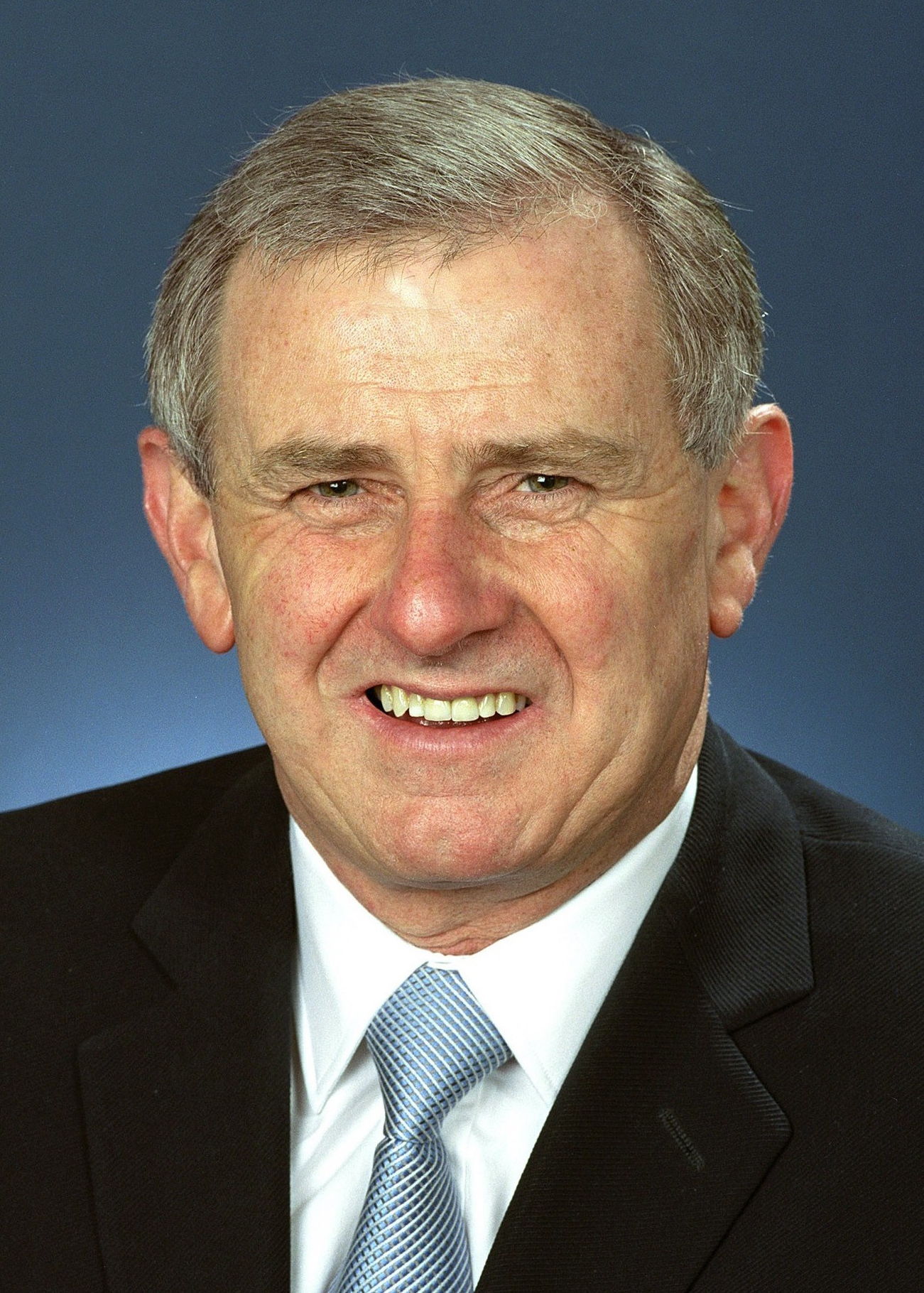
Candidate	Anthony Albanese	Simon Crean
Caucus vote	61	38
Percentage	61.6%	38.4%
Seat	Grayndler (NSW)	Hotham (VIC)
Faction	Left	Right
Deputy Leader before election
Wayne Swan
Elected Deputy Leader
Anthony Albanese

A leadership spill in the Australian Labor Party, the party then forming the Government of Australia, took place on 26 June 2013 at 7:00pm AEST. Prime Minister Julia Gillard called a ballot for Leader and Deputy Leader of the Labor Party live on Sky News Australia at 4:00pm, following persistent leadership tensions. She stated that she would retire from politics if she lost the vote, while calling on any would-be challengers to pledge to do the same if they lost. In a press conference held shortly after Gillard's announcement, backbencher and former Prime Minister Kevin Rudd announced that he would challenge Gillard, whilst also pledging to step down if he did not win the vote. At the ALP caucus meeting, Rudd was elected Leader of the Labor Party, with the caucus voting 57–45 in his favour.

Following new leadership election reforms which introduced 50:50 weightage for the party membership and caucus in leadership votes subsequently implemented by Rudd, this marked the last time that the Leader of the Federal Parliamentary Labor Party was elected solely by the caucus.

== Background ==
Despite the previous leadership spill on 21 March 2013, at which Gillard was re-elected leader unopposed, tensions continued to remain high. By 10 June 2013, the security of Gillard's position as leader was plunged into doubt following the loss of significant support in the Labor caucus, as well as persistently bad opinion polling that indicated Labor could be left with the low number of 40 seats in the House of Representatives. ABC News reported that "some former staunch supporters" now held the view that Gillard could not win the upcoming election, and ABC journalist Barrie Cassidy identified former Prime Minister Kevin Rudd as the only feasible replacement.

The political editor of The Australian newspaper, Dennis Shanahan, reported on 10 June that Rudd had been "mobbed" by members of the public in Geelong on 7 June 2013, and that he was "expected to be returned to the ALP leadership". On 26 June, rumours began to spread that supporters of Rudd were circulating a caucus petition calling for a vote to challenge Gillard for the leadership. In an interview with Sky News Australia that afternoon, Gillard told interviewer David Speers that she had not seen the rumoured petition, and jokingly called it the "political equivalent of the Loch Ness Monster". She also said that nobody had approached her to advise they intended to challenge her. Gillard then proceeded to call a leadership election for 7:00pm that evening to end the speculation, declaring that she would retire from politics if she lost, and called on any potential challenger to make the same commitment.

Rudd announced in a press conference shortly afterwards that he would challenge Gillard for the leadership, and committed to retiring from politics if he lost. Shortly before the 7:00pm vote, influential factional leader Bill Shorten, who had first come out in support of Gillard in the 2010 and 2012 leadership spills, announced that he would support Rudd as he believed he was the person most likely to defeat Tony Abbott in the upcoming general election.

== Result ==
102 members of the Labor caucus from the House of Representatives and the Senate were eligible to vote, with 52 votes needed to win. All caucus members voted and Kevin Rudd won the ballot by 57 votes to 45, therefore becoming Leader of the Labor Party for the second time. Following the result, Deputy Leader Wayne Swan announced that he would resign his position. Anthony Albanese subsequently defeated Simon Crean by 61 votes to 38 votes, thus becoming the Deputy Leader of the Labor Party. Penny Wong was also unanimously elected to be Labor's leader in the Senate, with Jacinta Collins elected as her deputy.

Supporters
Rudd	Gillard
Anthony Albanese	Sharon Bird
Chris Bowen	Tony Burke
David Bradbury	Stephen Conroy
Gai Brodtmann	Greg Combet
Mark Butler	Michael Danby
Doug Cameron	Mark Dreyfus
Bob Carr	Kate Ellis
Kim Carr	Craig Emerson
Darren Cheeseman	Don Farrell
Jason Clare	Peter Garrett
Jacinta Collins	Gary Gray
Julie Collins	Chris Hayes
Simon Crean	Yvette D'Ath
Justine Elliot	Andrew Leigh
David Feeney	Joe Ludwig
Joel Fitzgibbon	Kate Lundy
Martin Ferguson	Jenny Macklin
Alan Griffin	Brendan O'Connor
Ed Husic	Tanya Plibersek
Stephen Jones	Bernie Ripoll
Mike Kelly	Stephen Smith
Geoff Lyons	Wayne Swan
Robert McClelland	
Richard Marles	
John Murphy	
Shayne Neumann	
Deborah O'Neill	
Michelle Rowland	
Janelle Saffin	
Bill Shorten	
Sid Sidebottom	
Laura Smyth	
Kelvin Thomson	
Penny Wong	

== Summary of changes ==
Office	Predecessor	Successor(s)
Prime Minister	Julia Gillard MP	Kevin Rudd MP
Deputy Prime Minister	Wayne Swan MP	Anthony Albanese MP
Deputy Leader of the Labor Party	Wayne Swan MP	Anthony Albanese MP
Treasurer of Australia	Wayne Swan MP	Chris Bowen MP
Broadband, Communications and the Digital Economy	Senator Stephen Conroy	Anthony Albanese MP
Agriculture, Fisheries and Forestry	Senator Joe Ludwig	Joel Fitzgibbon MP
Trade and Competitiveness	Dr Craig Emerson MP	Richard Marles MP (as Minister for Trade)
Trade and Competitiveness	Dr Craig Emerson MP	David Bradbury MP (as Minister for Competition Policy and Consumer Affairs)
Tertiary Education, Skills, Science and Research	Dr Craig Emerson MP	Brendan O'Connor MP (as Minister for Skills and Training)
Tertiary Education, Skills, Science and Research	Dr Craig Emerson MP	Senator Kim Carr (as Minister for Innovation, Industry, Science and Research)
Climate Change, Industry and Innovation	Greg Combet MP	Senator Kim Carr (as Minister for Innovation, Industry, Science and Research)
Climate Change, Industry and Innovation	Greg Combet MP	Mark Butler MP (as Minister for Climate Change)
Sustainability, Environment, Water, Population and Communities	Tony Burke MP	Mark Butler MP (as Minister for the Environment, Heritage and Water)
School Education, Early Childhood and Youth	Peter Garrett MP	Bill Shorten MP (as Minister for Education)
School Education, Early Childhood and Youth	Peter Garrett MP	Kate Ellis MP (as Minister for Early Childhood, Childcare and Youth)
Regional Development and Local Government	Anthony Albanese MP	Catherine King MP (as Minister for Regional Australia, Local Government and Territories)
Regional Development and Local Government	Anthony Albanese MP	Sharon Bird MP (as Minister for Regional Development)
Higher Education and Skills	Sharon Bird MP	Senator Kim Carr (as Minister for Higher Education)
Higher Education and Skills	Sharon Bird MP	Brendan O'Connor MP (as Minister for Skills and Training)
Employment	Bill Shorten MP	Brendan O'Connor MP
Financial Services and Superannuation	Bill Shorten MP	David Bradbury MP (as Minister Assisting for Financial Services and Superannuation)
Mental Health and Ageing Social Inclusion; Assisting the Prime Minister on Mental Health Reform	Mark Butler MP	Senator Jacinta Collins (as Minister for Mental Health and Ageing)
Housing and Homelessness	Mark Butler MP	Julie Collins MP
Immigration and Citizenship	Brendan O'Connor MP	Tony Burke MP (as Minister for Immigration, Multicultural Affairs and Citizenship)

== Aftermath ==
Julia Gillard publicly congratulated Kevin Rudd on his victory, and announced her resignation as Prime Minister of Australia. In keeping with the pledge she made before the vote, she also announced that she would not seek re-election at the upcoming general election. Wayne Swan, Craig Emerson, Peter Garrett, Stephen Conroy, Joe Ludwig and Greg Combet all also announced their resignations from the cabinet. Gillard submitted her resignation as Prime Minister to Governor-General Quentin Bryce that evening, to take effect the following day. Rudd was subsequently sworn in as prime minister for the second time, with Anthony Albanese being sworn in as Deputy Prime Minister.

In July 2013, Rudd proposed changes to the ALP's leadership election which required that 75% (or 60% when the party is in opposition) of the party's caucus membership vote in favour for a spill motion to be considered, these changes were subsequently adopted by a special session of caucus. The wider membership and the caucus vote is weighted at 50% each.

On 4 August 2013, Rudd visited the Governor-General and asked her to dissolve parliament and issue writs for an election on 7 September.

At the 2013 federal election on 7 September, Rudd led Labor to defeat and resigned as Labor leader. It is estimated that Rudd's re-appointment as prime minister over Gillard saved Labor between 15 to 25 seats at the election.

== See also ==
- 2010 Australian Labor Party leadership spill
- 2012 Australian Labor Party leadership spill
- March 2013 Australian Labor Party leadership spill
- Second Rudd Ministry
