= 2010 Australian Labor Party leadership spill =

- 24 June 2010
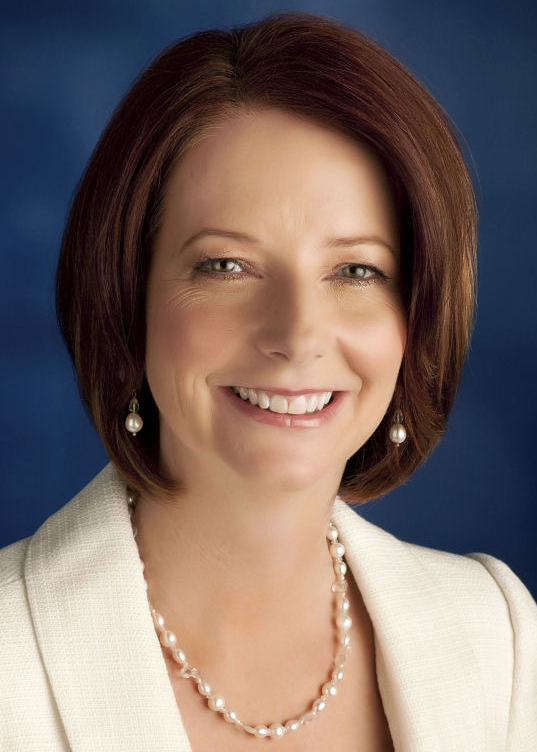
Candidate	Julia Gillard
Caucus vote	Unopposed
Seat	Lalor
Faction	Left
Leader before election
Kevin Rudd
Elected Leader
Julia Gillard

A leadership spill occurred in the Australian Labor Party on 24 June 2010. Kevin Rudd, the prime minister of Australia, was challenged by Julia Gillard, the deputy prime minister of Australia, for the leadership of the Australian Labor Party. Gillard won the election unopposed after Rudd declined to contest, choosing instead to resign. Gillard was duly sworn in as prime minister by Quentin Bryce, the Governor-General, on 24 June 2010 at Government House, becoming Australia's first female prime minister.

Gillard was the Deputy Leader of the Labor Party since 4 December 2006, and was appointed Deputy Prime Minister of Australia after Labor's landslide victory in the 2007 federal election. She was also appointed the Minister for Education and Minister for Employment and Workplace Relations.

== Background ==
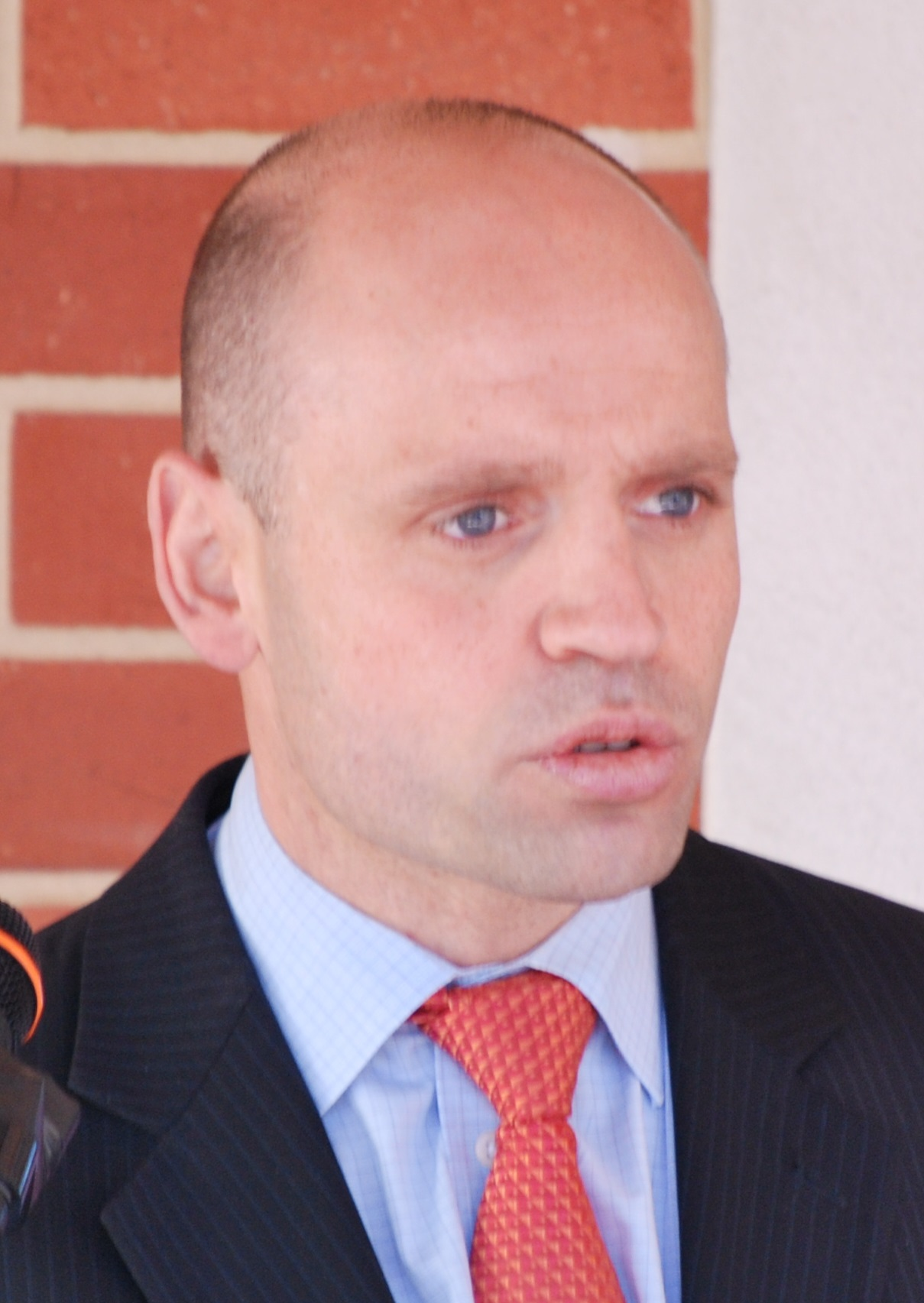
Mark Arbib of the New South Wales Right Faction.

Rudd and Gillard became Leader and Deputy Leader of the Australian Labor Party on 4 December 2006, during the fourth and final term of the Howard government. The pair successfully challenged sitting Leader Kim Beazley and Deputy Leader Jenny Macklin in a joint-ticket leadership election, brought about by opinion polls suggesting that Rudd was far more popular with the public than Beazley.

Under the leadership of Rudd and Gillard, Labor defeated the Liberal/National Coalition at the 2007 federal election by a landslide. The Rudd Ministry was sworn in by Governor-General Michael Jeffery on 3 December, with Rudd becoming the first Labor prime minister in over a decade, and Gillard becoming the first-ever female deputy prime minister. Rudd also appointed Gillard as Minister for Education, Employment and Workplace Relations.

After an initial long period of popularity, by mid-2010 polls began to detect disaffection both with the direction of the Government and the leadership style of Kevin Rudd; several opinion polls in April and May 2010 suggested that Labor would lose the next election. According to the ABC's 7:30 Report, the seeds for Gillard to challenge Rudd were sown by "Victorian Right factional heavyweights" Bill Shorten MP and Senator David Feeney, who had between them secured the support of "New South Wales power broker" Mark Arbib. Feeney and Arbib discussed the matter of a potential leadership challenge with Gillard on the morning of 23 June and began a numbers count to establish the feasibility of a leadership challenge. The pair found that there was enough support for Gillard for the challenge to proceed.

Declining approval for both the Labor Party and Rudd personally were attributed to many factors, including problems with the Home Insulation Program, a significant delay to a planned carbon emissions reduction scheme, the proposed introduction of the Resource Super Profits Tax, and the election of Tony Abbott as Leader of the Opposition.

The controversy regarding the Resource Super Profits Tax was such that an "ad war" between the government and mining interests began in May 2010 and continued until the downfall of Prime Minister Kevin Rudd in June 2010. The Australian Electoral Commission released figures indicating mining interests had spent $22 m in campaigning and advertisements in the six weeks prior to the end of the Rudd prime ministership.

Senior Labor MPs conceded that the ALP's primary vote had dropped below 30% in some key marginal seats, a figure which if replicated at a federal election would have seen a Labor defeat.

The leadership challenge was finally sparked after the influential Australian Workers' Union officially switched its support from Rudd to Gillard. AWU Secretary Paul Howes told the Australian Associated Press and ABC's Lateline that he and AWU President Bill Ludwig had decided to support Gillard as prime minister after making an assessment that a change in leadership was in the best interest of their membership.

== Challenge ==
Better Labor Leader polling Thinking about the leadership of the Federal Parliamentary Labor Party. Do you think Julia Gillard will be a better leader than Kevin Rudd, a worse leader or about the same?
About the same	Better leader	Worse leader	Uncommitted
47%	38%	9%	6%
conducted by Newspoll and published in The Australian. Polling (25–27 June 2010).

On the morning of 23 June 2010, NSW senator Mark Arbib, Victorians Shorten and David Feeney, and South Australian Don Farrell visited Gillard to tell her that enough Labor MPs and senators had lost confidence in Prime Minister Rudd to make a challenge feasible. By midday, Arbib and Feeney told Gillard that they could guarantee her the support of the majority of right-wing members from New South Wales, Victoria, Queensland, South Australia and Western Australia, giving Gillard enough support to win the leadership and become prime minister.

Arbib and Feeney told Gillard that most of the Labor Party were convinced they would lose the next election if Rudd continued as prime minister. They also said that they believed Labor would be able to win with Gillard as prime minister. Party sources later told the Australian Broadcasting Corporation (ABC) that Gillard agreed that Labor faced electoral defeat with Rudd at the helm.

After holding meetings throughout the evening, Rudd addressed the media at 10:30 pm to announce that Gillard had asked for him to either resign as prime minister or hold a leadership election the following day to determine the Leadership of the Labor Party. Rudd stated that a leadership election would take place the following day and that he would stand as a candidate.

The Sydney Morning Herald reported that the final catalyst for the challenge against Rudd was "sparked by a report (in the Herald of 23 June) that Mr Rudd had used his Chief of Staff, Alister Jordan, to sound out the backbench over the past month on the level of support for him. This followed a Herald/Nielsen poll which showed the government would lose if an election were held then", and that "Rudd's action was regarded as a sign that he did not trust the repeated assurances by Ms Gillard that she would not stand".

== Results ==
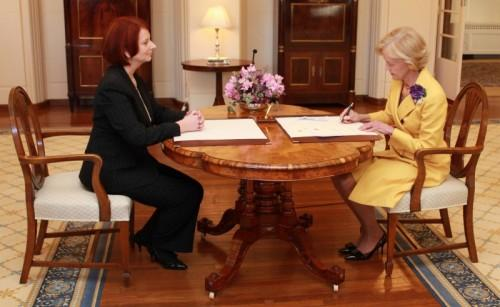
Julia Gillard is sworn in as Prime Minister by Governor-General Quentin Bryce at Yarralumla

All 115 Labor Members of the House of Representatives and Senators were eligible to vote in the ballot. A total of 58 votes were required to secure a winning majority.

Whilst announcing the leadership election, Rudd initially declared that he would re-nominate himself for the leadership, even in the face of growing support for Gillard. However, by the morning of the vote it had become clear he did not have the support to secure a majority in the vote. Hours before the vote was due to take place, Rudd announced that he was withdrawing his candidacy and resigned as Leader of the Labor Party with immediate effect. This left Gillard to assume the leadership unopposed. Wayne Swan, Treasurer of Australia at the time, was elected to fill Gillard's now vacant position as Deputy Leader, also unopposed. Rudd resigned as prime minister at midday, and Gillard was sworn in as the first female prime minister of Australia shortly afterwards.

== Aftermath ==
On 17 July 2010, just 23 days after becoming prime minister, Gillard advised the Governor-General Quentin Bryce she wished to hold an election for 21 August 2010. After a close contest between Gillard's Labor and Tony Abbott's Liberal/National Coalition, the election resulted in the first hung parliament since the 1940 election. Gillard was able to secure the support of the sole Greens MP and three Independent MPs in order to allow Labor to form a minority government, and Gillard was sworn in as prime minister for a second time on 14 September 2010. Kevin Rudd, who had successfully re-contested his seat at the election, accepted an offer to become minister for foreign affairs.

Rudd regained the leadership, and the prime ministership, at the June 2013 Australian Labor Party leadership spill, shortly before Labor lost government at the 2013 Australian federal election.

== Alleged foreign interference ==
Left-wing news outlets such as Jacobin and the World Socialist Web Site have alleged that the ousting of Rudd was influenced by the United States (U.S.).

In November 2010, WikiLeaks leaked multiple classified cables from the U.S. State Department which revealed that several key members of the Labor Right that were responsible for Rudd's removal and the installation of Gillard were "protected sources" and in regular exchange with the US embassy in Canberra. These sources included Mark Arbib, Bob McMullan, Gillard's speech writer Michael Cooney, Michael Danby and Peter Khalil.

Arbib, who has been considered kingmaker in the "Gillard coup", has reportedly been secretly briefing the U.S. embassy as early as October 2009 about the state of the Rudd government and possible leadership challenges to Rudd. Arbib warned the U.S. around one year prior to the challenge that Rudd was trying to forestall a possible challenge from Gillard. This coincides with Don Farrell, who revealed in another leaked cable to the US that Gillard had already planned replacing Rudd one year prior to the drop in the polls and the leadership challenge.

In 2024, political commentator and Labor supporter Jordan Shanks expressed the view that Gillard collaborated with the U.S. to remove Rudd.

== See also ==
- Faceless men
