= Results of the 2013 Australian federal election in New South Wales =

2013 Australian federal election (New South Wales)
- 7 September 2013

All 48 New South Wales seats in the Australian House of Representatives and 6 (of the 12) seats in the Australian Senate
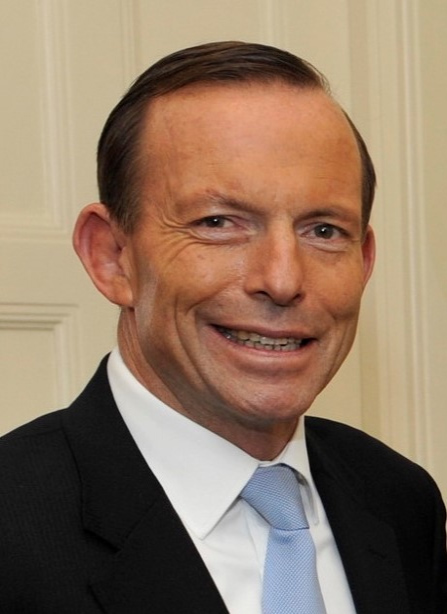

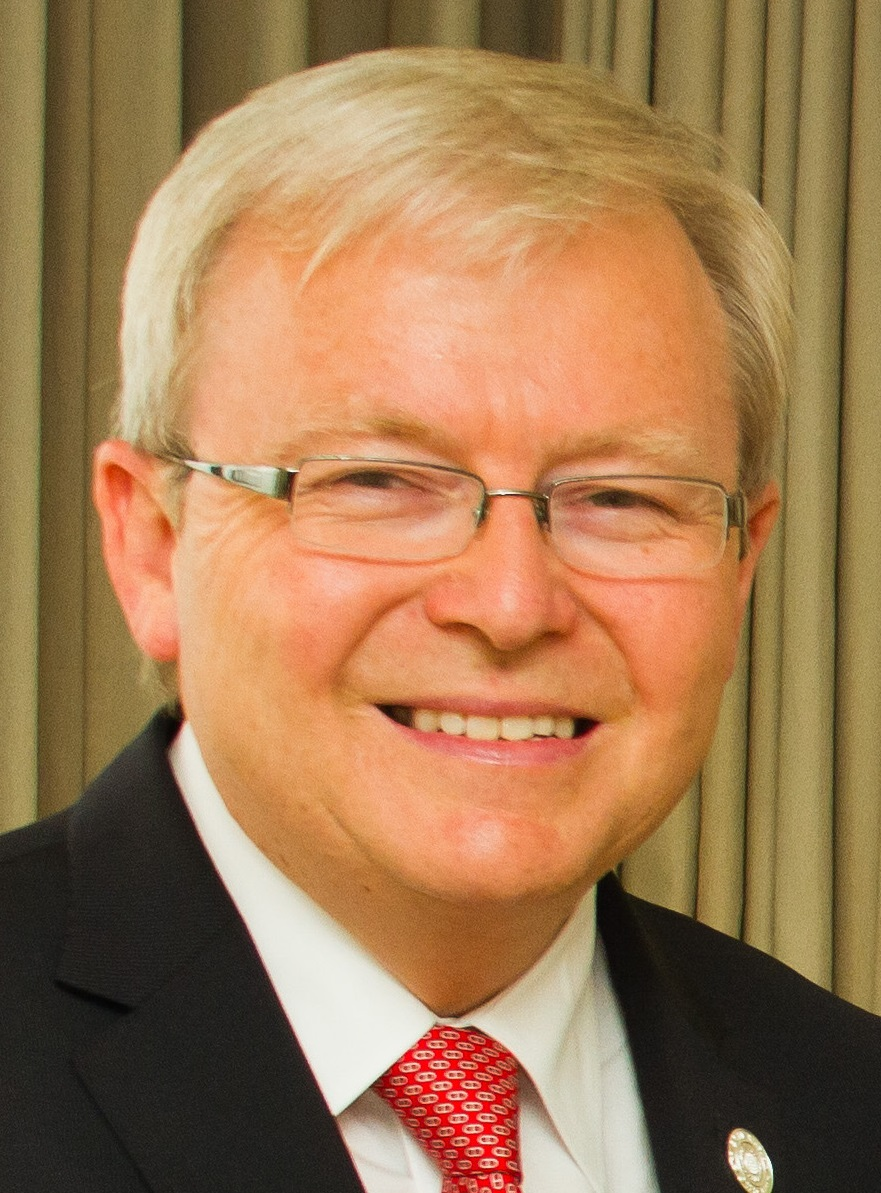
	First party	Second party
Leader	Tony Abbott	Kevin Rudd
Party	Liberal/National coalition	Labor
Last election	20 seats	26 seats
Seats won	30 seats	18 seats
Seat change	▲10	▼8
Popular vote	1,996,208	1,433,842
Percentage	47.34%	34.52%
Swing	▲2.74	▼2.76
TPP	54.35%	45.65%
TPP swing	▲3.19	▼3.19
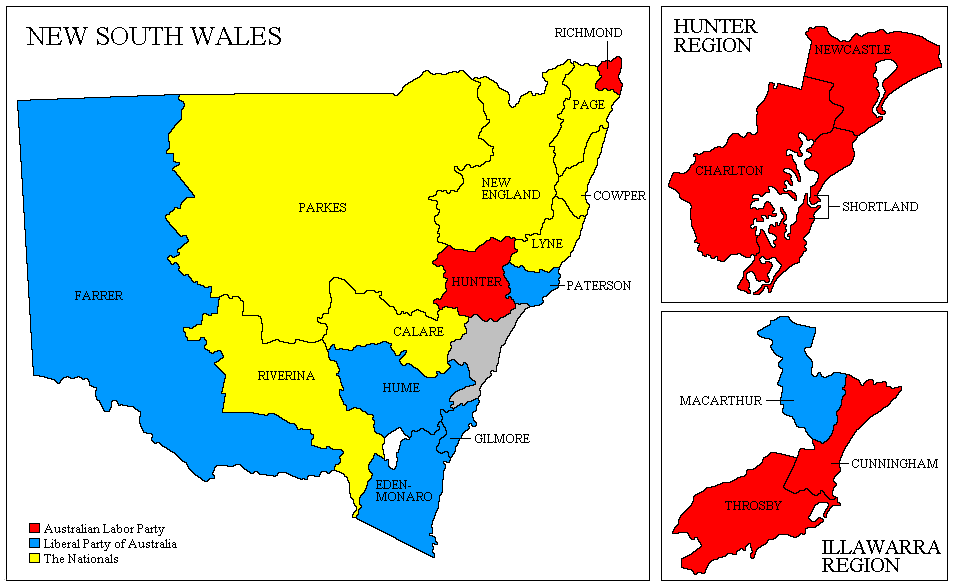
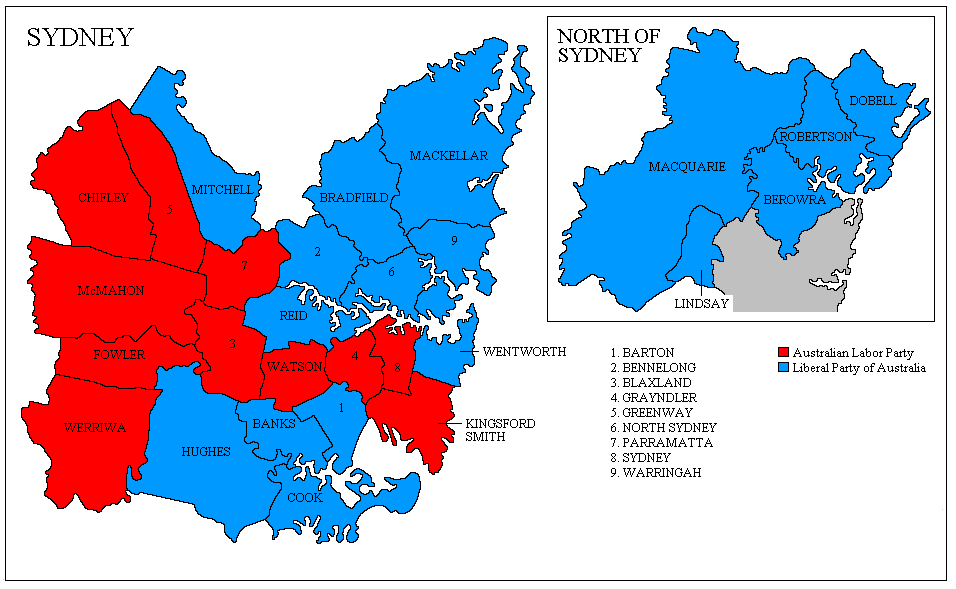

This is a list of electoral division results for the Australian 2013 federal election in the state of New South Wales.

This election was held using instant-runoff voting. At this election, there were three "turn-overs" in New South Wales. Labor won the seats of Kingsford Smith and Parramatta despite the Liberals finishing first, as well as the seat of Richmond despite the Nationals finishing first.

== Overall results ==
Party	Votes	%	Swing	Seats	Change
Coalition	1,966,208	47.34	+2.74	30	▲10
Liberal Party of Australia	1,551,436	37.35	+0.68	23	▲7
National Party of Australia	414,772	9.99	+2.06	7	▲3
Australian Labor Party	1,433,842	34.52	−2.76	18	▼8
Australian Greens	330,050	7.95	–2.29		
Palmer United Party	174,551	4.20	+4.20		
Christian Democratic Party	88,576	2.13	+0.77		
One Nation	19,517	0.47	–0.01		
Democratic Labour Party	16,909	0.41	+0.41		
Katter's Australian Party	16,534	0.40	+0.40		
Bullet Train for Australia	8,174	0.20	+0.20		
Australia First Party	6,084	0.15	+0.07		
Rise Up Australia Party	5,449	0.13	+0.13		
Citizens Electoral Council	4,057	0.10	+0.07		
Australian Sex Party	3,292	0.08	+0.00		
Australian Stable Population Party	2,245	0.05	+0.05		
Australian Independents	2,092	0.05	+0.05		
Non-Custodial Parents Party	1,332	0.03	–0.04		
Socialist Alliance	1,229	0.03	–0.06		
Future Party	693	0.02	+0.02		
Secular Party of Australia	602	0.01	–0.08		
Australian Voice Party	545	0.01	+0.01		
Independents	71,848	1.73	−2.58	0	▼2
Total	4,153,829			48	
Two-party-preferred vote
Liberal/National Coalition	2,257,654	54.35	+3.19	30	▲10
Australian Labor Party	1,896,175	45.65	–3.19	18	▼8

== Results by division ==
=== Banks ===
2013 Australian federal election: Banks
Party	Candidate	Votes	%	±%
Liberal	David Coleman	39,899	47.01	+1.49
Labor	Daryl Melham	34,835	41.04	−1.92
Greens	Paul Spight	4,242	5.00	−4.61
Palmer United	Jake Wellham	2,125	2.50	+2.50
Christian Democrats	Mark Falanga	1,983	2.34	+2.34
Independent	Sayed Khedr	768	0.90	+0.90
Katter's Australian	Ross Richardson	553	0.65	+0.65
Democratic Labour	Robert Haddad	470	0.55	+0.55
Total formal votes		84,875	90.05	−1.58
Informal votes		9,374	9.95	+1.58
Turnout		94,249	92.86	+0.16
Two-party-preferred result
Liberal	David Coleman	43,990	51.83	+3.28
Labor	Daryl Melham	40,885	48.17	−3.28
Liberal gain from Labor		Swing	+3.28	

=== Barton ===
2013 Australian federal election: Barton
Party	Candidate	Votes	%	±%
Liberal	Nickolas Varvaris	33,881	42.35	+1.68
Labor	Steve McMahon	32,345	40.43	−8.05
Greens	Jackie Brooker	4,788	5.98	−4.87
Palmer United	Edward Caruana	3,114	3.89	+3.89
Independent	Michael Nagi	3,071	3.84	+3.84
Christian Democrats	Kylie French	1,549	1.94	+1.94
One Nation	Perry Theo	686	0.86	+0.86
Katter's Australian	Rodney Wyse	567	0.71	+0.71
Total formal votes		80,001	87.96	−2.22
Informal votes		10,948	12.04	+2.22
Turnout		90,949	92.16	+0.54
Two-party-preferred result
Liberal	Nickolas Varvaris	40,245	50.31	+7.17
Labor	Steve McMahon	39,756	49.69	−7.17
Liberal gain from Labor		Swing	+7.17	

=== Bennelong ===
2013 Australian federal election: Bennelong
Party	Candidate	Votes	%	±%
Liberal	John Alexander	46,907	52.99	+4.46
Labor	Jason Yat-Sen Li	28,726	32.45	−4.67
Greens	Lindsay Peters	7,454	8.42	+0.47
Christian Democrats	Julie Worsley	2,135	2.41	+0.28
Palmer United	Robert Marks	1,589	1.80	+1.80
Democratic Labour	Lachlan McCaffrey	617	0.70	+0.70
Secular	John August	602	0.68	+0.68
Australia First	Victor Waterson	492	0.56	+0.56
Total formal votes		88,522	92.48	−0.15
Informal votes		7,200	7.52	+0.15
Turnout		95,722	93.35	−0.17
Two-party-preferred result
Liberal	John Alexander	51,139	57.77	+4.65
Labor	Jason Yat-Sen Li	37,383	42.23	−4.65
Liberal hold		Swing	+4.65	

=== Berowra ===
2013 Australian federal election: Berowra
Party	Candidate	Votes	%	±%
Liberal	Philip Ruddock	53,236	61.44	+1.46
Labor	Michael Stove	16,402	18.93	−3.12
Greens	John Storey	8,684	10.02	−1.37
Independent	Mick Gallagher	3,374	3.89	+1.03
Palmer United	Paul Graves	2,324	2.68	+2.68
Christian Democrats	Leighton Thew	2,135	2.46	−0.28
Stable Population	Deborah Smythe	492	0.57	+0.57
Total formal votes		86,647	94.45	−0.96
Informal votes		5,096	5.55	+0.96
Turnout		91,743	94.56	+0.11
Two-party-preferred result
Liberal	Philip Ruddock	59,847	69.07	+2.87
Labor	Michael Stove	26,800	30.93	−2.87
Liberal hold		Swing	+2.87	

=== Blaxland ===
2013 Australian federal election: Blaxland
Party	Candidate	Votes	%	±%
Labor	Jason Clare	43,568	55.73	+4.75
Liberal	Anthony Khouri	25,579	32.72	−0.58
Greens	John Ky	2,416	3.09	−3.17
Palmer United	Zali Burrows	2,119	2.71	+2.71
Katter's Australian	Nafez Taleb	1,921	2.46	+2.46
Christian Democrats	Juliat Nasr	1,757	2.25	+2.25
Democratic Labour	Boutros Zalloua	817	1.05	+1.05
Total formal votes		78,177	86.33	+0.39
Informal votes		12,380	13.67	−0.39
Turnout		90,557	90.30	+0.21
Two-party-preferred result
Labor	Jason Clare	48,025	61.43	−0.80
Liberal	Anthony Khouri	30,152	38.57	+0.80
Labor hold		Swing	−0.80	

=== Bradfield ===
2013 Australian federal election: Bradfield
Party	Candidate	Votes	%	±%
Liberal	Paul Fletcher	57,506	64.84	+0.39
Labor	Chris Haviland	14,720	16.60	−2.62
Greens	Pippa McInnes	11,429	12.89	−3.45
Palmer United	Blake Buchanan	2,366	2.67	+2.67
Christian Democrats	John Archer	1,671	1.88	+1.88
Democratic Labour	Paul Harrold	992	1.12	+1.12
Total formal votes		88,684	94.26	−1.64
Informal votes		5,401	5.74	+1.64
Turnout		94,085	93.62	+0.22
Two-party-preferred result
Liberal	Paul Fletcher	62,771	70.78	+2.60
Labor	Chris Haviland	25,913	29.22	−2.60
Liberal hold		Swing	+2.60	

=== Calare ===
2013 Australian federal election: Calare
Party	Candidate	Votes	%	±%
National	John Cobb	52,650	57.65	+5.24
Labor	Jess Jennings	23,185	25.39	−3.66
Palmer United	Brian Cain	4,356	4.77	+4.77
Greens	David Mallard	4,054	4.44	−1.56
Independent	Macgregor Ross	2,388	2.61	+0.57
Christian Democrats	Ian Lyons	1,628	1.78	−0.41
Katter's Australian	Billie Kirkland	1,293	1.42	+1.42
Australia First	Peter Schultze	1,010	1.11	+1.11
Democratic Labour	Anthony Craig	759	0.83	+0.83
Total formal votes		91,323	93.89	−1.18
Informal votes		5,942	6.11	+1.18
Turnout		97,265	95.32	−0.02
Two-party-preferred result
National	John Cobb	60,248	65.97	+5.23
Labor	Jess Jennings	31,075	34.03	−5.23
National hold		Swing	+5.23	

=== Charlton ===
2013 Australian federal election: Charlton
Party	Candidate	Votes	%	±%
Labor	Pat Conroy	40,125	46.44	−6.71
Liberal	Kevin Baker	24,646	28.53	−2.18
Palmer United	Bronwyn Reid	9,412	10.89	+10.89
Greens	Dessie Kocher	5,820	6.74	−2.09
Christian Democrats	Steve Camilleri	2,671	3.09	+0.27
One Nation	Brian Burston	2,266	2.62	+2.62
Bullet Train	Trevor Anthoney	1,460	1.69	+1.69
Total formal votes		86,400	92.89	−0.19
Informal votes		6,618	7.11	+0.19
Turnout		93,018	94.40	−0.08
Two-party-preferred result
Labor	Pat Conroy	51,173	59.23	−3.44
Liberal	Kevin Baker	35,227	40.77	+3.44
Labor hold		Swing	−3.44	

=== Chifley ===
2013 Australian federal election: Chifley
Party	Candidate	Votes	%	±%
Labor	Ed Husic	43,044	52.30	+0.72
Liberal	Isabelle White	26,479	32.17	+1.85
Palmer United	Christopher Buttel	3,361	4.08	+4.08
Christian Democrats	Dave Vincent	2,862	3.48	−1.58
Greens	Ben Hammond	2,198	2.67	−5.76
Independent	Ammar Khan	1,749	2.13	+2.13
One Nation	Elizabeth Power	1,402	1.70	−0.27
Democratic Labour	Michael Wright	810	0.98	+0.98
Australia First	Alex Norwick	396	0.48	−0.69
Total formal votes		82,301	86.64	−2.20
Informal votes		12,690	13.36	+2.20
Turnout		94,991	92.78	+0.09
Two-party-preferred result
Labor	Ed Husic	49,831	60.55	−1.79
Liberal	Isabelle White	32,470	39.45	+1.79
Labor hold		Swing	−1.79	

=== Cook ===
2013 Australian federal election: Cook
Party	Candidate	Votes	%	±%
Liberal	Scott Morrison	55,707	60.35	+2.47
Labor	Peter Scaysbrook	22,850	24.76	−4.05
Greens	Mithra Cox	6,058	6.56	−1.17
Palmer United	Matthew Palise	3,765	4.08	+4.08
Christian Democrats	Beth Smith	1,981	2.15	+0.23
Independent	Graeme Strang	1,321	1.43	−0.32
Australia First	Jim Saleam	617	0.67	+0.67
Total formal votes		92,299	94.08	−0.11
Informal votes		5,813	5.92	+0.11
Turnout		98,112	94.17	−0.25
Two-party-preferred result
Liberal	Scott Morrison	61,244	66.35	+3.69
Labor	Peter Scaysbrook	31,055	33.65	−3.69
Liberal hold		Swing	+3.69	

=== Cowper ===
2013 Australian federal election: Cowper
Party	Candidate	Votes	%	±%
National	Luke Hartsuyker	45,820	53.05	+2.28
Labor	Alfredo Navarro	21,910	25.37	−2.45
Greens	Carol Vernon	10,685	12.37	+3.28
Palmer United	Rodney Jeanneret	5,739	6.64	+6.64
Christian Democrats	Bethany McAlpine	2,224	2.57	+0.18
Total formal votes		86,378	94.72	−0.95
Informal votes		4,813	5.28	+0.95
Turnout		91,191	93.86	−0.19
Two-party-preferred result
National	Luke Hartsuyker	53,303	61.71	+2.44
Labor	Alfredo Navarro	33,075	38.29	−2.44
National hold		Swing	+2.44	

=== Cunningham ===
2013 Australian federal election: Cunningham
Party	Candidate	Votes	%	±%
Labor	Sharon Bird	41,522	45.54	−3.63
Liberal	Philip Clifford	30,685	33.65	+0.80
Greens	Helen Wilson	10,730	11.77	−3.35
Palmer United	Christopher Atlee	4,253	4.66	+4.66
Christian Democrats	Rob George	2,204	2.42	+2.42
Non-Custodial Parents	John Flanagan	897	0.98	−0.41
Katter's Australian	John Bursill	886	0.97	+0.97
Total formal votes		91,177	93.63	−0.69
Informal votes		6,208	6.37	+0.69
Turnout		97,385	93.56	−0.21
Two-party-preferred result
Labor	Sharon Bird	54,595	59.88	−3.29
Liberal	Philip Clifford	36,582	40.12	+3.29
Labor hold		Swing	−3.29	

=== Dobell ===
2013 Australian federal election: Dobell
Party	Candidate	Votes	%	±%
Liberal	Karen McNamara	35,617	41.35	+1.11
Labor	Emma McBride	30,248	35.11	−11.16
Independent	Nathan Bracken	7,090	8.23	+8.23
Greens	Sue Wynn	4,238	4.92	−3.69
Independent	Craig Thomson	3,444	4.00	+4.00
Palmer United	Kate McGill	2,920	3.39	+3.39
Christian Democrats	Hadden Ervin	1,250	1.45	−0.97
Citizens Electoral Council	Greg Owen	711	0.83	+0.83
Bullet Train	Christian Kunde	622	0.72	+0.72
Total formal votes		86,140	92.49	−1.45
Informal votes		6,994	7.51	+1.45
Turnout		93,134	93.82	−0.20
Two-party-preferred result
Liberal	Karen McNamara	43,653	50.68	+5.75
Labor	Emma McBride	42,487	49.32	−5.75
Liberal gain from Labor		Swing	+5.75	

=== Eden-Monaro ===
2013 Australian federal election: Eden-Monaro
Party	Candidate	Votes	%	±%
Liberal	Peter Hendy	40,431	45.27	+3.43
Labor	Mike Kelly	34,638	38.78	−4.83
Greens	Catherine Moore	6,725	7.53	−2.19
Palmer United	Dean Lynch	4,655	5.21	+5.21
Independent	Andrew Thaler	1,223	1.37	+1.37
Christian Democrats	Warren Catton	861	0.96	+0.21
Stable Population	Martin Tye	601	0.67	+0.67
Citizens Electoral Council	Costas Goumas	179	0.20	+0.20
Total formal votes		89,313	94.46	+0.71
Informal votes		5,240	5.54	−0.71
Turnout		94,553	94.52	+0.13
Two-party-preferred result
Liberal	Peter Hendy	45,199	50.61	+4.85
Labor	Mike Kelly	44,114	49.39	−4.85
Liberal gain from Labor		Swing	+4.85	

=== Farrer ===
2013 Australian federal election: Farrer
Party	Candidate	Votes	%	±%
Liberal	Sussan Ley	47,977	57.81	+6.40
Labor	Gavin Hickey	19,708	23.75	−1.54
Greens	Christina Sobey	3,643	4.39	−1.49
Palmer United	Ronald Emmerton	3,392	4.09	+4.09
Katter's Australian	Ken Trewin	3,091	3.72	+3.72
Rise Up Australia	Narelle Davis	1,646	1.98	+1.98
Democratic Labour	Brendan Cattell	1,509	1.82	+1.82
Bullet Train	Tracey Powell	1,048	1.26	+1.26
Christian Democrats	Frank Horwill	982	1.18	−2.03
Total formal votes		82,996	92.89	−0.77
Informal votes		6,357	7.11	+0.77
Turnout		89,353	94.53	+0.35
Two-party-preferred result
Liberal	Sussan Ley	55,961	67.43	+2.92
Labor	Gavin Hickey	27,035	32.57	−2.92
Liberal hold		Swing	+2.92	

=== Fowler ===
2013 Australian federal election: Fowler
Party	Candidate	Votes	%	±%
Labor	Chris Hayes	47,772	60.76	+7.90
Liberal	Andrew Nguyen	21,043	26.76	−10.18
Christian Democrats	Matt Attia	3,559	4.53	+4.53
Palmer United	Bradley Pastoors	2,722	3.46	+3.46
Greens	Benjamin Silaphet	2,684	3.41	−3.28
Katter's Australian	Darren McLean	848	1.08	+1.08
Total formal votes		78,628	86.07	−1.10
Informal votes		12,728	13.93	+1.10
Turnout		91,356	92.16	−0.13
Two-party-preferred result
Labor	Chris Hayes	52,526	66.80	+8.04
Liberal	Andrew Nguyen	26,102	33.20	−8.04
Labor hold		Swing	+8.04	

=== Gilmore ===
2013 Australian federal election: Gilmore
Party	Candidate	Votes	%	±%
Liberal	Ann Sudmalis	41,726	46.00	−4.93
Labor	Neil Reilly	31,789	35.05	−0.13
Greens	Terry Barratt	8,438	9.30	−0.27
Palmer United	Lyndal Harris	5,726	6.31	+6.31
Christian Democrats	Steve Ryan	3,030	3.34	+0.67
Total formal votes		90,709	94.83	−0.06
Informal votes		4,946	5.17	+0.06
Turnout		95,655	94.29	−0.33
Two-party-preferred result
Liberal	Ann Sudmalis	47,758	52.65	−2.67
Labor	Neil Reilly	42,951	47.35	+2.67
Liberal hold		Swing	−2.67	

=== Grayndler ===
2013 Australian federal election: Grayndler
Party	Candidate	Votes	%	±%
Labor	Anthony Albanese	42,009	47.20	+1.11
Liberal	Cedric Spencer	21,981	24.70	+0.46
Greens	Hall Greenland	20,498	23.03	−2.87
Christian Democrats	Joshua Green	1,828	2.05	+2.05
Palmer United	Mohanadas Balasingham	1,522	1.71	+1.71
Bullet Train	Joel Scully	1,171	1.32	+1.32
Total formal votes		89,009	93.00	+0.08
Informal votes		6,699	7.00	−0.08
Turnout		95,708	91.32	+0.01
Two-party-preferred result
Labor	Anthony Albanese	62,613	70.34	−0.29
Liberal	Cedric Spencer	26,396	29.66	+0.29
Labor hold		Swing	−0.29	

=== Greenway ===
2013 Australian federal election: Greenway
Party	Candidate	Votes	%	±%
Labor	Michelle Rowland	38,319	44.48	+2.16
Liberal	Jaymes Diaz	34,488	40.04	−1.30
Palmer United	Jodie Wootton	3,483	4.04	+4.04
Christian Democrats	Allan Green	3,253	3.78	+0.10
Greens	Chris Brentin	3,175	3.69	−2.32
Sex Party	Tom Lillicrap	1,516	1.76	+1.76
Rise Up Australia	Maree Nichols	681	0.79	+0.79
Katter's Australian	Anthony Belcastro	681	0.79	+0.79
Australian Voice	Jamie Cavanough	545	0.63	+0.63
Total formal votes		86,141	90.02	+0.29
Informal votes		9,549	9.98	−0.29
Turnout		95,690	93.96	−0.23
Two-party-preferred result
Labor	Michelle Rowland	45,639	52.98	+2.10
Liberal	Jaymes Diaz	40,502	47.02	−2.10
Labor hold		Swing	+2.10	

=== Hughes ===
2013 Australian federal election: Hughes
Party	Candidate	Votes	%	±%
Liberal	Craig Kelly	48,436	54.68	+5.53
Labor	Alison Megarrity	28,406	32.07	−5.71
Palmer United	John Peters	5,224	5.90	+5.90
Greens	Signe Westerberg	3,948	4.46	−1.83
Christian Democrats	Peter Colsell	2,561	2.89	+0.44
Total formal votes		88,575	92.61	−0.87
Informal votes		7,071	7.39	+0.87
Turnout		95,646	94.24	+0.03
Two-party-preferred result
Liberal	Craig Kelly	53,735	60.67	+5.50
Labor	Alison Megarrity	34,840	39.33	−5.50
Liberal hold		Swing	+5.50	

=== Hume ===
2013 Australian federal election: Hume
Party	Candidate	Votes	%	±%
Liberal	Angus Taylor	49,105	53.97	+0.41
Labor	Michael Pilbrow	23,711	26.06	−5.80
Greens	Zaza Chevalier	5,218	5.73	−1.92
Palmer United	Jason Cornelius	4,015	4.41	+4.41
One Nation	Lynette Styles	2,521	2.77	+2.77
Independent	James Harker-Mortlock	2,096	2.30	+2.30
Katter's Australian	Bruce Nicholson	1,658	1.82	+1.82
Christian Democrats	Adrian Van Der Byl	1,397	1.54	−0.22
Citizens Electoral Council	Lindsay Cosgrove	1,273	1.40	+1.40
Total formal votes		90,994	93.68	−1.19
Informal votes		6,142	6.32	+1.19
Turnout		97,136	94.93	−0.02
Two-party-preferred result
Liberal	Angus Taylor	55,938	61.47	+2.75
Labor	Michael Pilbrow	35,056	38.53	−2.75
Liberal hold		Swing	+2.75	

=== Hunter ===
2013 Australian federal election: Hunter
Party	Candidate	Votes	%	±%
Labor	Joel Fitzgibbon	38,241	44.50	−9.81
National	Michael Johnsen	30,170	35.11	+4.06
Palmer United	Jennifer Stefanac	6,552	7.62	+7.62
Greens	David Atwell	5,066	5.89	−3.03
One Nation	Bill Fox	3,245	3.78	+0.43
Christian Democrats	Richard Stretton	1,834	2.13	−0.25
Citizens Electoral Council	Ann Lawler	833	0.97	+0.97
Total formal votes		85,941	93.46	−0.33
Informal votes		6,014	6.54	+0.33
Turnout		91,955	94.51	−0.22
Two-party-preferred result
Labor	Joel Fitzgibbon	46,125	53.67	−8.81
National	Michael Johnsen	39,816	46.33	+8.81
Labor hold		Swing	−8.81	

=== Kingsford Smith ===
2013 Australian federal election: Kingsford Smith
Party	Candidate	Votes	%	±%
Liberal	Michael Feneley	37,455	43.50	+2.25
Labor	Matt Thistlethwaite	36,177	42.02	−1.81
Greens	James Macdonald	8,431	9.79	−2.26
Palmer United	Diane Happ	1,611	1.87	+1.87
Christian Democrats	Jacquie Shiha	1,379	1.60	+1.60
Future	Geordie Lucas	693	0.80	+0.80
Rise Up Australia	Danielle Somerfield	357	0.41	+0.41
Total formal votes		86,103	91.37	−0.48
Informal votes		8,130	8.63	+0.48
Turnout		94,233	92.01	+0.63
Two-party-preferred result
Labor	Matt Thistlethwaite	45,411	52.74	−2.42
Liberal	Michael Feneley	40,692	47.26	+2.42
Labor hold		Swing	−2.42	

=== Lindsay ===
2013 Australian federal election: Lindsay
Party	Candidate	Votes	%	±%
Liberal	Fiona Scott	40,882	46.64	+3.25
Labor	David Bradbury	34,212	39.03	−5.52
Palmer United	Andrew Wilcox	4,517	5.15	+5.15
Greens	David Lenton	2,679	3.06	−1.68
Christian Democrats	Andrew Green	2,449	2.79	−0.22
One Nation	Jeffrey Lawson	1,901	2.17	+2.17
Australia First	Mick Saunders	610	0.70	−0.47
Stable Population	Geoff Brown	408	0.47	+0.47
Total formal votes		87,658	91.79	−0.04
Informal votes		7,837	8.21	+0.04
Turnout		95,495	94.32	−0.11
Two-party-preferred result
Liberal	Fiona Scott	46,446	52.99	+4.11
Labor	David Bradbury	41,212	47.01	−4.11
Liberal gain from Labor		Swing	+4.11	

=== Lyne ===
2013 Australian federal election: Lyne
Party	Candidate	Votes	%	±%
National	David Gillespie	45,871	53.19	+18.80
Labor	Peter Alley	18,352	21.28	+7.79
Independent	Steve Attkins	6,561	7.61	+7.61
Greens	Ian Oxenford	5,340	6.19	+1.90
Palmer United	Troy Wilkie	4,727	5.48	+5.48
One Nation	Craig Huth	2,208	2.56	+2.56
Christian Democrats	John Klose	2,054	2.38	+2.38
Katter's Australian	Brian Buckley Clare	814	0.94	+0.94
Citizens Electoral Council	Michael Gough	318	0.37	+0.37
Total formal votes		86,245	93.69	−2.58
Informal votes		5,809	6.31	+2.58
Turnout		92,054	94.78	−0.60
Two-party-preferred result
National	David Gillespie	55,857	64.77	+2.32
Labor	Peter Alley	30,388	35.23	−2.32
National gain from Independent		Swing	+2.32	

The sitting member was Rob Oakeshott (Independent) who did not contest the election.

=== Macarthur ===
2013 Australian federal election: Macarthur
Party	Candidate	Votes	%	±%
Liberal	Russell Matheson	46,185	54.33	+6.93
Labor	Ian Fulton	26,039	30.63	−7.92
Palmer United	Goetz Grosche	4,916	5.78	+5.78
Greens	Patrick Darley-Jones	3,929	4.62	−0.94
Christian Democrats	Sarah Ramsay	2,189	2.58	+0.82
Katter's Australian	Mick Williams	1,751	2.06	+2.06
Total formal votes		85,009	92.17	+0.28
Informal votes		7,225	7.83	−0.28
Turnout		92,234	94.15	−0.37
Two-party-preferred result
Liberal	Russell Matheson	52,161	61.36	+8.34
Labor	Ian Fulton	32,848	38.64	−8.34
Liberal hold		Swing	+8.34	

=== Mackellar ===
2013 Australian federal election: Mackellar
Party	Candidate	Votes	%	±%
Liberal	Bronwyn Bishop	56,521	62.43	+0.31
Labor	Chris Hedge	15,606	17.24	−3.86
Greens	Jonathan King	12,843	14.19	−2.58
Palmer United	Debra Drummond	3,771	4.17	+4.17
Christian Democrats	Silvana Nero	1,791	1.98	+1.98
Total formal votes		90,532	94.25	−0.55
Informal votes		5,525	5.75	+0.55
Turnout		96,057	93.40	+0.14
Two-party-preferred result
Liberal	Bronwyn Bishop	62,322	68.84	+3.12
Labor	Chris Hedge	28,210	31.16	−3.12
Liberal hold		Swing	+3.12	

=== Macquarie ===
2013 Australian federal election: Macquarie
Party	Candidate	Votes	%	±%
Liberal	Louise Markus	42,590	47.36	+2.89
Labor	Susan Templeman	27,872	31.00	−1.36
Greens	Danielle Wheeler	9,986	11.10	−2.99
Palmer United	Philip Maxwell	3,731	4.15	+4.15
Christian Democrats	Tony Piper	2,720	3.02	+0.87
Sex Party	Mark Littlejohn	1,776	1.98	+1.98
Australia First	Matt Hodgson	750	0.83	+0.06
Democratic Labour	Teresa Elaro	499	0.55	+0.55
Total formal votes		89,924	94.37	−0.15
Informal votes		5,362	5.63	+0.15
Turnout		95,286	94.63	−0.18
Two-party-preferred result
Liberal	Louise Markus	48,987	54.48	+3.22
Labor	Susan Templeman	40,937	45.52	−3.22
Liberal hold		Swing	+3.22	

=== McMahon ===
2013 Australian federal election: McMahon
Party	Candidate	Votes	%	±%
Labor	Chris Bowen	41,334	50.19	−1.07
Liberal	Ray King	33,430	40.59	+4.34
Palmer United	Matthew Dobrincic	2,862	3.48	+3.48
Greens	Astrid O'Neill	2,410	2.93	−5.12
Christian Democrats	Manny Poularas	2,323	2.82	−1.62
Total formal votes		82,359	88.65	−0.51
Informal votes		10,542	11.35	+0.51
Turnout		92,901	93.57	+0.33
Two-party-preferred result
Labor	Chris Bowen	45,561	55.32	−2.49
Liberal	Ray King	36,798	44.68	+2.49
Labor hold		Swing	−2.49	

=== Mitchell ===
2013 Australian federal election: Mitchell
Party	Candidate	Votes	%	±%
Liberal	Alex Hawke	56,706	65.47	+2.81
Labor	Andrew Punch	17,775	20.52	−5.81
Greens	Michael Bellstedt	5,554	6.41	−1.19
Christian Democrats	Darryl Allen	2,794	3.23	−0.18
Palmer United	Murray Schultz	2,792	3.22	+3.22
Democratic Labour	Nathan Dodd	987	1.14	+1.14
Total formal votes		86,608	93.69	−0.73
Informal votes		5,833	6.31	+0.73
Turnout		92,441	94.65	−0.12
Two-party-preferred result
Liberal	Alex Hawke	62,425	72.08	+4.92
Labor	Andrew Punch	24,183	27.92	−4.92
Liberal hold		Swing	+4.92	

=== New England ===
2013 Australian federal election: New England
Party	Candidate	Votes	%	±%
National	Barnaby Joyce	49,486	54.21	+28.99
Independent	Rob Taber	12,574	13.77	+13.77
Labor	Stephen Hewitt	10,825	11.86	+3.73
Independent	Jamie McIntyre	6,059	6.64	+6.64
Palmer United	Phillip Girle	4,746	5.20	+5.20
Greens	Pat Schultz	4,184	4.58	+1.01
One Nation	Brian Dettmann	1,566	1.72	+0.85
Christian Democrats	Aaron Evans	1,496	1.64	+1.64
Citizens Electoral Council	Richard Witten	353	0.39	+0.05
Total formal votes		91,289	93.95	−2.51
Informal votes		5,881	6.05	+2.51
Turnout		97,170	95.14	+0.26
Notional two-party-preferred count
National	Barnaby Joyce	64,551	70.71	+3.91
Labor	Stephen Hewitt	26,738	29.29	−3.91
Two-candidate-preferred result
National	Barnaby Joyce	58,846	64.46	+35.98
Independent	Rob Taber	32,443	35.54	+35.54
National gain from Independent		Swing	N/A	

The sitting member was Tony Windsor (Independent) who did not contest the election.

=== Newcastle ===
2013 Australian federal election: Newcastle
Party	Candidate	Votes	%	±%
Labor	Sharon Claydon	37,391	43.73	−4.16
Liberal	Jaimie Abbott	29,632	34.66	+3.33
Greens	Michael Osborne	10,258	12.00	−3.47
Palmer United	Yegon McLellan	3,518	4.11	+4.11
Christian Democrats	Milton Caine	1,091	1.28	−0.52
Progressive Labour	Susanna Scurry	1,026	1.20	+1.20
Australia First	Michael Chehoff	922	1.08	+1.08
Independent	Rod Holding	674	0.79	+0.79
Socialist Alliance	Zane Alcorn	616	0.72	−0.29
Australian Independents	Lawrence Higgins	367	0.43	+0.43
Total formal votes		85,495	93.80	−0.51
Informal votes		5,653	6.20	+0.51
Turnout		91,148	93.60	0.00
Two-party-preferred result
Labor	Sharon Claydon	50,298	58.83	−3.66
Liberal	Jaimie Abbott	35,197	41.17	+3.66
Labor hold		Swing	−3.66	

=== North Sydney ===
2013 Australian federal election: North Sydney
Party	Candidate	Votes	%	±%
Liberal	Joe Hockey	53,991	61.04	+1.33
Labor	Peter Hayes	17,727	20.04	−2.08
Greens	Alison Haines	13,579	15.35	−0.18
Palmer United	Raheam Khan	1,493	1.69	+1.69
Christian Democrats	Maureen Guthrie	892	1.01	+1.01
Democratic Labour	Angus McCaffrey	766	0.87	+0.87
Total formal votes		88,448	94.62	−0.94
Informal votes		5,031	5.38	+0.94
Turnout		93,479	92.26	+0.34
Two-party-preferred result
Liberal	Joe Hockey	58,274	65.89	+1.83
Labor	Peter Hayes	30,174	34.11	−1.83
Liberal hold		Swing	+1.83	

=== Page ===
2013 Australian federal election: Page
Party	Candidate	Votes	%	±%
National	Kevin Hogan	40,088	46.65	+4.18
Labor	Janelle Saffin	33,336	38.79	−6.94
Greens	Desley Banks	5,601	6.52	−2.06
Palmer United	Stephen Janes	4,135	4.81	+4.81
Christian Democrats	Carol Ordish	1,394	1.62	+1.62
One Nation	Rod Smith	1,381	1.61	+1.61
Total formal votes		85,935	95.32	−0.29
Informal votes		4,223	4.68	+0.29
Turnout		90,158	94.20	−0.46
Two-party-preferred result
National	Kevin Hogan	45,134	52.52	+6.71
Labor	Janelle Saffin	40,801	47.48	−6.71
National gain from Labor		Swing	+6.71	

=== Parkes ===
2013 Australian federal election: Parkes
Party	Candidate	Votes	%	±%
National	Mark Coulton	58,020	64.01	+4.78
Labor	Brendan Byron	18,850	20.80	−0.46
Palmer United	Neil Gorman	6,724	7.42	+7.42
Greens	Matt Parmeter	4,691	5.18	−0.42
Christian Democrats	Michelle Ryan	2,354	2.60	+2.60
Total formal votes		90,639	94.26	−0.72
Informal votes		5,519	5.74	+0.72
Turnout		96,158	94.36	+0.04
Two-party-preferred result
National	Mark Coulton	65,575	72.35	+3.49
Labor	Brendan Byron	25,064	27.65	−3.49
National hold		Swing	+3.49	

=== Parramatta ===
2013 Australian federal election: Parramatta
Party	Candidate	Votes	%	±%
Liberal	Martin Zaiter	35,724	44.31	+3.59
Labor	Julie Owens	33,261	41.26	−3.20
Greens	Phil Bradley	4,261	5.29	−2.67
Christian Democrats	Alex Sharah	1,957	2.43	−0.64
Palmer United	Ganesh Loke	1,760	2.18	+2.18
Democratic Labour	Miechele Williams	1,626	2.02	+2.02
Independent	Kalpesh Patel	1,204	1.49	−0.34
One Nation	Tania Rollinson	822	1.02	+1.02
Total formal votes		80,615	89.48	−1.87
Informal votes		9,474	10.52	+1.87
Turnout		90,089	91.40	+0.19
Two-party-preferred result
Labor	Julie Owens	40,765	50.57	−3.80
Liberal	Martin Zaiter	39,850	49.43	+3.80
Labor hold		Swing	−3.80	

=== Paterson ===
2013 Australian federal election: Paterson
Party	Candidate	Votes	%	±%
Liberal	Bob Baldwin	46,922	53.86	+2.56
Labor	Bay Marshall	25,811	29.63	−8.63
Greens	John Brown	5,812	6.67	+0.68
Palmer United	Jayson Packett	5,451	6.26	+6.26
Christian Democrats	Anna Balfour	1,854	2.13	+1.07
Rise Up Australia	Bob Holz	877	1.01	+1.01
Citizens Electoral Council	Peter Davis	390	0.45	+0.45
Total formal votes		87,117	94.83	+0.47
Informal votes		4,746	5.17	−0.47
Turnout		91,863	94.60	−0.16
Two-party-preferred result
Liberal	Bob Baldwin	52,080	59.78	+4.45
Labor	Bay Marshall	35,037	40.22	−4.45
Liberal hold		Swing	+4.45	

=== Reid ===
2013 Australian federal election: Reid
Party	Candidate	Votes	%	±%
Liberal	Craig Laundy	40,430	47.11	+4.00
Labor	John Murphy	34,817	40.57	−0.94
Greens	Pauline Tyrrell	5,968	6.95	−4.23
Palmer United	Mohammed Ashraf	1,298	1.51	+1.51
Christian Democrats	Bill Shailer	1,219	1.42	−1.65
Australian Independents	Raymond Palmer	1,215	1.42	+1.42
Democratic Labour	Emily Dunn	580	0.68	+0.68
Katter's Australian	Bishrul Izadeen	297	0.35	+0.35
Total formal votes		85,824	90.51	−0.69
Informal votes		9,003	9.49	+0.69
Turnout		94,827	91.42	+0.36
Two-party-preferred result
Liberal	Craig Laundy	43,642	50.85	+3.53
Labor	John Murphy	42,182	49.15	−3.53
Liberal gain from Labor		Swing	+3.53	

=== Richmond ===
2013 Australian federal election: Richmond
Party	Candidate	Votes	%	±%
National	Matthew Fraser	32,066	37.60	+16.39
Labor	Justine Elliot	28,575	33.51	−5.68
Greens	Dawn Walker	15,083	17.69	+1.54
Palmer United	Charles Allen	6,359	7.46	+7.46
Independent	Kev Skinner	1,971	2.31	+2.31
Christian Democrats	John Ordish	1,224	1.44	+1.44
Total formal votes		85,278	95.09	+0.64
Informal votes		4,403	4.91	−0.64
Turnout		89,681	92.09	−0.55
Two-party-preferred result
Labor	Justine Elliot	45,179	52.98	−4.01
National	Matthew Fraser	40,099	47.02	+4.01
Labor hold		Swing	−4.01	

=== Riverina ===
2013 Australian federal election: Riverina
Party	Candidate	Votes	%	±%
National	Michael McCormack	52,062	59.18	+14.41
Labor	Tim Kurylowicz	17,970	20.43	−1.80
Palmer United	Lex Stewart	4,545	5.17	+5.17
Greens	Ros Prangnell	3,169	3.60	−0.90
Democratic Labour	Paul Funnell	3,137	3.57	+3.57
Bullet Train	Andrew Lamont	2,405	2.73	+2.73
Christian Democrats	Keith Pech	1,314	1.49	+0.13
Australia First	Lorraine Sharp	1,287	1.46	+1.46
Katter's Australian	Norm Dunn	1,044	1.19	+1.19
Rise Up Australia	Kim Heath	1,040	1.18	+1.18
Total formal votes		87,973	93.03	−1.21
Informal votes		6,592	6.97	+1.21
Turnout		94,565	94.46	−0.25
Two-party-preferred result
National	Michael McCormack	62,612	71.17	+3.00
Labor	Tim Kurylowicz	25,361	28.83	−3.00
National hold		Swing	+3.00	

=== Robertson ===
2013 Australian federal election: Robertson
Party	Candidate	Votes	%	±%
Liberal	Lucy Wicks	38,704	43.42	−0.11
Labor	Deborah O'Neill	31,046	34.83	−4.93
Independent	Lawrie McKinna	7,763	8.71	+8.71
Greens	Kate Da Costa	4,966	5.57	−3.42
Independent	Jake Cassar	2,480	2.78	+1.52
Palmer United	Steven Whitaker	2,082	2.34	+2.34
Christian Democrats	Holly Beecham	1,115	1.25	−0.56
Australian Independents	Douglas McFarland	510	0.57	+0.57
Democratic Labour	Paul Sheeran	474	0.53	+0.53
Total formal votes		89,140	94.09	+0.45
Informal votes		5,604	5.91	−0.45
Turnout		94,744	93.97	−0.39
Two-party-preferred result
Liberal	Lucy Wicks	47,242	53.00	+4.00
Labor	Deborah O'Neill	41,898	47.00	−4.00
Liberal gain from Labor		Swing	+4.00	

=== Shortland ===
2013 Australian federal election: Shortland
Party	Candidate	Votes	%	±%
Labor	Jill Hall	41,892	48.69	−5.05
Liberal	John Church	32,532	37.81	+4.65
Palmer United	Philip Baldwin	5,341	6.21	+6.21
Greens	Jane Oakley	5,198	6.04	−4.29
Christian Democrats	Andrew Weatherstone	1,081	1.26	+1.26
Total formal votes		86,044	93.99	+0.33
Informal votes		5,498	6.01	−0.33
Turnout		91,542	94.44	−0.42
Two-party-preferred result
Labor	Jill Hall	49,230	57.21	−5.64
Liberal	John Church	36,814	42.79	+5.64
Labor hold		Swing	−5.64	

=== Sydney ===
2013 Australian federal election: Sydney
Party	Candidate	Votes	%	±%
Labor	Tanya Plibersek	40,579	46.03	+2.74
Liberal	Sean O'Connor	26,901	30.52	+2.42
Greens	Dianne Hiles	15,273	17.33	−6.42
Independent	Jane Ward	1,408	1.60	+0.06
Palmer United	Timothy Kelly	1,261	1.43	+1.43
Bullet Train	Leah Gartner	791	0.90	+0.90
Christian Democrats	Lesley Mason	723	0.82	+0.82
Socialist Alliance	Peter Boyle	613	0.70	+0.70
Independent	Joanna Rzetelski	602	0.68	+0.68
Total formal votes		88,151	93.80	−0.70
Informal votes		5,830	6.20	+0.70
Turnout		93,981	88.33	+0.18
Two-party-preferred result
Labor	Tanya Plibersek	56,994	64.65	−2.42
Liberal	Sean O'Connor	31,157	35.35	+2.42
Labor hold		Swing	−2.42	

=== Throsby ===
2013 Australian federal election: Throsby
Party	Candidate	Votes	%	±%
Labor	Stephen Jones	37,980	45.00	−5.53
Liberal	Larissa Mallinson	23,498	27.84	−2.47
National	Gary Anderson	8,539	10.12	+4.80
Greens	Peter Moran	4,613	5.47	−6.46
Palmer United	May King	3,885	4.60	+4.60
Independent	Paul Matters	1,948	2.31	+2.31
Christian Democrats	John Kadwell	1,938	2.30	+2.30
Bullet Train	Elrond Veness	677	0.80	+0.80
Katter's Australian	Glenn Turner	473	0.56	+0.56
Non-Custodial Parents	Wayne Hartman	435	0.52	−1.39
Democratic Labour	Brian Boulton	407	0.48	+0.48
Total formal votes		84,393	91.17	−1.93
Informal votes		8,174	8.83	+1.93
Turnout		92,567	94.06	+0.43
Two-party-preferred result
Labor	Stephen Jones	48,753	57.77	−4.34
Liberal	Larissa Mallinson	35,640	42.23	+4.34
Labor hold		Swing	−4.34	

=== Warringah ===
2013 Australian federal election: Warringah
Party	Candidate	Votes	%	±%
Liberal	Tony Abbott	54,388	60.89	+1.97
Labor	Jules Zanetti	17,259	19.32	−2.32
Greens	Will Kitching	13,873	15.53	−0.81
Palmer United	Brodie Stewart	1,961	2.20	+2.20
Stable Population	Mike Cottee	744	0.83	+0.83
Christian Democrats	Ula Falanga	630	0.71	+0.71
Rise Up Australia	Mike Bloomfield	472	0.53	+0.53
Total formal votes		89,327	94.62	−0.74
Informal votes		5,078	5.38	+0.74
Turnout		94,405	91.95	−0.19
Two-party-preferred result
Liberal	Tony Abbott	58,374	65.35	+2.26
Labor	Jules Zanetti	30,953	34.65	−2.26
Liberal hold		Swing	+2.26	

=== Watson ===
2013 Australian federal election: Watson
Party	Candidate	Votes	%	±%
Labor	Tony Burke	39,126	49.51	−0.92
Liberal	Ron Delezio	30,617	38.74	+1.57
Greens	Barbara Bloch	4,171	5.28	−4.34
Palmer United	Zaher Nasser	1,970	2.49	+2.49
Christian Democrats	David Fraser	1,873	2.37	+2.37
Democratic Labour	Stephen Rawson	897	1.14	+1.14
Rise Up Australia	Paul Kamlade	376	0.48	+0.48
Total formal votes		79,030	86.05	−1.15
Informal votes		12,814	13.95	+1.15
Turnout		91,844	90.64	+0.60
Two-party-preferred result
Labor	Tony Burke	44,895	56.81	−2.33
Liberal	Ron Delezio	34,135	43.19	+2.33
Labor hold		Swing	−2.33	

=== Wentworth ===
2013 Australian federal election: Wentworth
Party	Candidate	Votes	%	±%
Liberal	Malcolm Turnbull	58,306	63.32	+3.75
Labor	Di Smith	17,840	19.37	−1.70
Greens	Matthew Robertson	13,455	14.61	−2.83
Independent	Pat Sheil	1,054	1.14	+0.55
Palmer United	Marsha Foxman	998	1.08	+1.08
Christian Democrats	Beresford Thomas	431	0.47	+0.47
Total formal votes		92,084	94.30	−1.20
Informal votes		5,564	5.70	+1.20
Turnout		97,648	89.30	−0.17
Two-party-preferred result
Liberal	Malcolm Turnbull	62,359	67.72	+2.86
Labor	Di Smith	29,725	32.28	−2.86
Liberal hold		Swing	+2.86	

=== Werriwa ===
2013 Australian federal election: Werriwa
Party	Candidate	Votes	%	±%
Labor	Laurie Ferguson	34,117	44.09	−4.48
Liberal	Kent Johns	30,693	39.67	+0.95
Palmer United	Katryna Thirup	3,363	4.35	+4.35
Christian Democrats	John Ramsay	2,936	3.79	+3.79
Greens	Daniel Griffiths	2,532	3.27	−9.43
Democratic Labour	Michael Byrne	1,562	2.02	+2.02
One Nation	Marella Harris	1,519	1.96	+1.96
Katter's Australian	Kerryn Ball	657	0.85	+0.85
Total formal votes		77,379	87.13	−2.52
Informal votes		11,433	12.87	+2.52
Turnout		88,812	92.46	+0.11
Two-party-preferred result
Labor	Laurie Ferguson	40,426	52.24	−4.51
Liberal	Kent Johns	36,953	47.76	+4.51
Labor hold		Swing	−4.51	

== See also ==
- 2013 Australian federal election
- Results of the 2013 Australian federal election (House of Representatives)
- Post-election pendulum for the 2013 Australian federal election
- Members of the Australian House of Representatives, 2013–2016
