= Tim Ayres =

Australian politician (born 1973)

Senator The Honourable Tim Ayres
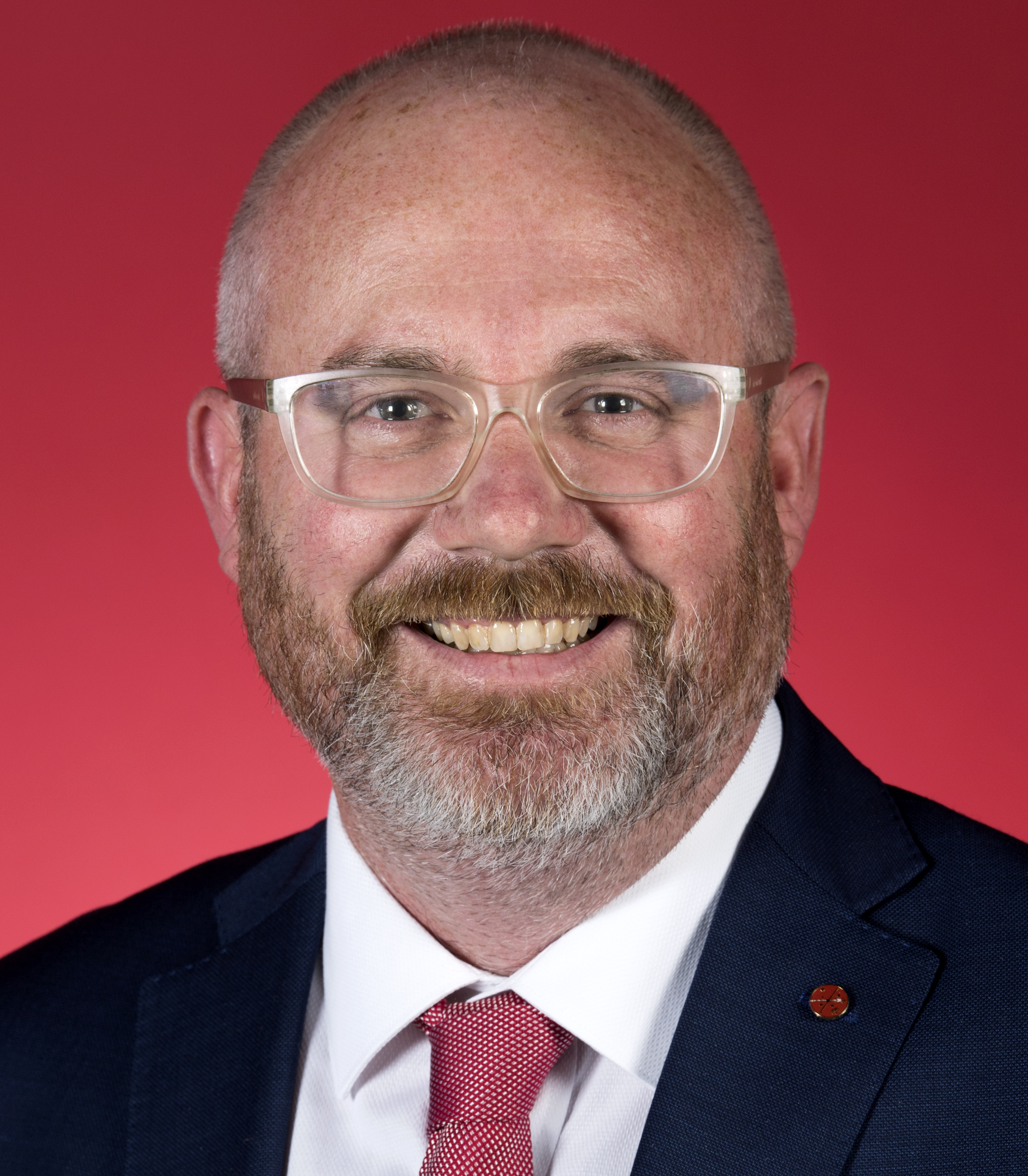
- Official portrait, 2022

Minister for Industry and Innovation Minister for Science
- Incumbent
- Assumed office 13 May 2025
- Prime Minister: Anthony Albanese
- Preceded by: Ed Husic (as Minister for Industry and Science)

Assistant Minister for Trade
- In office 1 June 2022 – 13 May 2025
- Prime Minister: Anthony Albanese
- Preceded by: David Gillespie (as Minister Assisting the Minister for Trade and Investment)
- Succeeded by: Matt Thistlethwaite (as Assistant Minister for Foreign Affairs and Trade)

Senator for New South Wales
- Incumbent
- Assumed office 1 July 2019
- Preceded by: Duncan Spender

Personal details
- Born: 18 December 1973 (age 52) Sydney, New South Wales, Australia
- Citizenship: Australia; Canada (2025) (Note: As a result of the Parliament of Canada passing Bill C-3 on 15 December 2025, Ayres became a citizen of Canada through descent due to his Canadian-born grandfather. Ayres subsequently relinquished his Canadian citizenship on 29 December 2025 due to section 44(i) of the Australian Constitution prohibiting parliamentarians from holding dual citizenship.)
- Party: Labor
- Education: University of Sydney
- Occupation: Trade unionist politician

Timothy Ayres (born 18 December 1973) is an Australian politician and trade unionist who was elected as a Senator for New South Wales at the 2019 federal election. He is a member of the Australian Labor Party and was previously a trade union official with the Australian Manufacturing Workers' Union (AMWU). He has served as the Minister for Industry and Innovation and Minister for Science in the Second Albanese ministry since 13 May 2025.

== Early life ==
Ayres was born in Sydney, on 18 December 1973. He was raised on a farm near Lismore, New South Wales. He completed his schooling at Glen Innes High School, before going on to study industrial relations at the University of Sydney. Ayres has at least one Canadian grandparent, causing him to briefly become a Canadian citizen when that nation changed its laws to extend citizenship by descent. Ayres renounced Canadian citizenship immediately, and the situation was described by Anne Twomey as an "unusual case of a person being validly elected, but then, against their will, having foreign citizenship conferred upon them", and it did not affect Ayres's eligibility to sit in Parliament.

== Career ==
Ayres worked as a union organiser in the Riverina until 2000, when he moved to Sydney. He was elected state secretary of the Australian Manufacturing Workers' Union (AMWU) in 2010.

In July 2017, Ayres won preselection for the ALP Senate ticket in New South Wales, replacing retiring senator Doug Cameron. He defeated former federal MP Chris Haviland by a substantial margin in a ballot of Labor Left factional delegates. According to The Australian, the vote was "highly controversial and acrimonious", and was boycotted by two major left-wing unions, the Maritime Union of Australia and the CFMEU.

Ayres was elected to the Senate at the 2019 federal election, running in second place on the ALP ticket in New South Wales. He made his first speech to parliament on 30 July 2019, in which he offered that "a cruel pea-heart beats inside the chest of this mean-spirited government".

In 2022, following the ALP's victory at the 2022 federal election, Ayres was appointed assistant trade minister in the Albanese government.

In 2025, Ayres was appointed the successor to Ed Husic as the Minister for Industry and Innovation and Minister for Science in the second Albanese ministry. Ayres' promotion was seen as recognition of his success in undertaking work as the Assistant Minister for Manufacturing and Labor's Made in Australia agenda.

== Notes ==
Political offices
Preceded by Ed Husic	Minister for Industry and Innovation; 2025–present	Incumbent
Preceded by Ed Husic	Minister for Science; 2025–present	Incumbent
