= Minister for Industry and Innovation =

Australian cabinet position

- Commonwealth Coat of Arms

- Flag of Australia

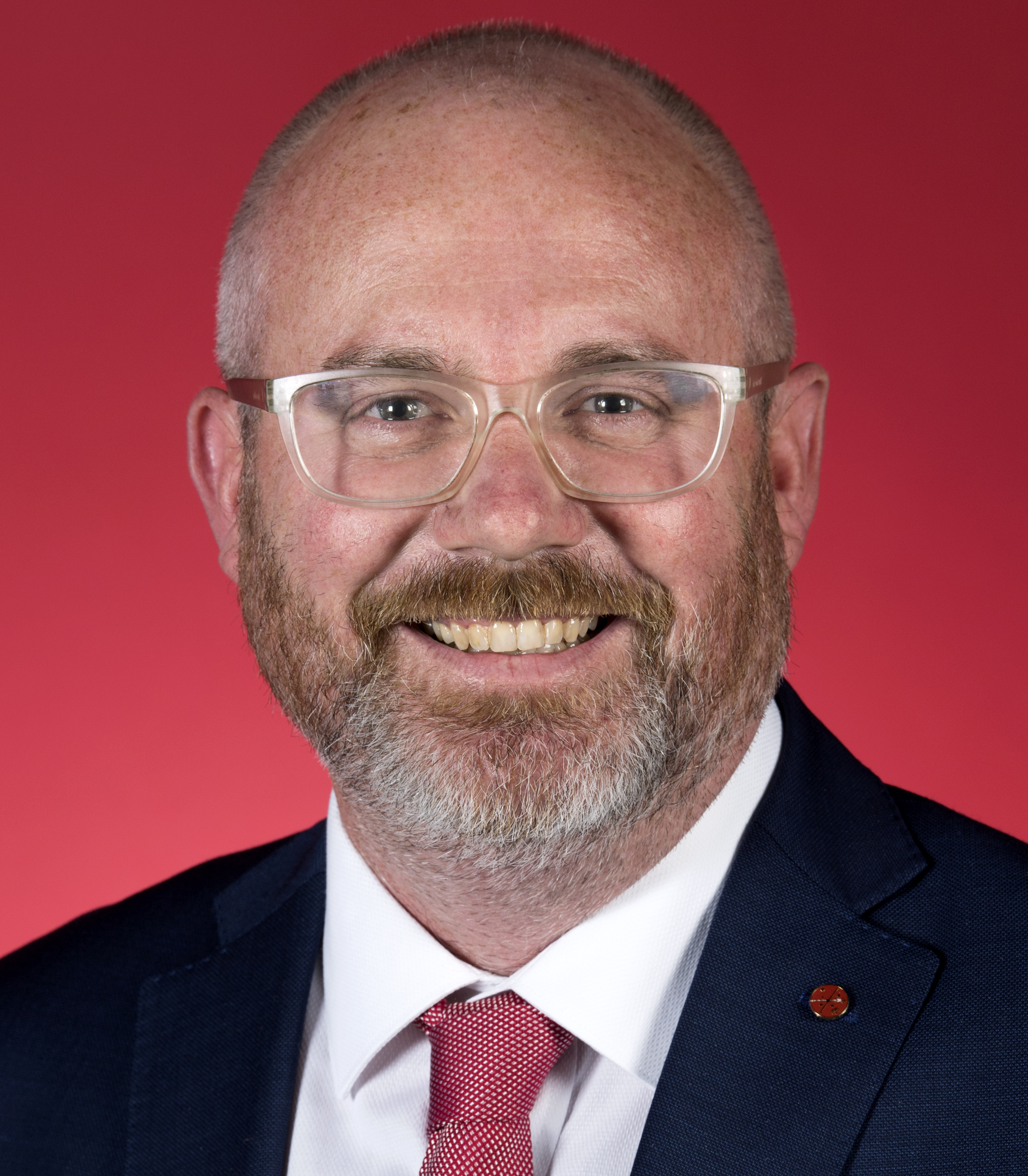
- Incumbent; Tim Ayres since 13 May 2025
- Department of Industry, Science and Resources
- Style: The Honourable
- Appointer: Governor-General on the advice of the prime minister
- Inaugural holder: John Latham (as Minister for Industry)
- Formation: 10 December 1928
- Website: www.minister.industry.gov.au/ministers/timayres

The Minister for Industry and Innovation is an Australian Government cabinet position which is currently held by Tim Ayres following his swearing-in on 13 May 2025 as a result of Anthony Albanese's Labor government being re-elected at the 2025 Australian federal election.

In the Government of Australia, the minister administers this portfolio through the Department of Industry, Science and Resources.

== Scope ==
As of 2013 other bodies in the portfolio included:

- Australian Nuclear Science and Technology Organisation;
- Australian Skills Quality Authority;
- Australian Workforce and Productivity Agency;
- CSIRO;
- Geoscience Australia;
- IP Australia;
- National Advisory for Tertiary Education, Skills and Employment;
- Office of the Chief Scientist;
- Tertiary Education Quality and Standards Agency.

The Australian Space Agency opened in Adelaide in February 2020.

== List of industry ministers ==
The following individuals have been appointed as Minister for Industry or any precursor title.

Order	Minister	Party	Prime Minister	Title	Term start	Term end	Term in office
1	John Latham	Nationalist	Bruce	Minister for Industry	10 December 1928	22 October 1929	316 days
2	James Scullin	Labor	Scullin	Minister for Industry	22 October 1929	6 January 1932	2 years, 76 days
(1)	John Latham	United Australia	Lyons	Minister for Industry	6 January 1932	12 October 1934	2 years, 279 days
3	Robert Menzies	United Australia	Lyons	Minister for Industry	12 October 1934	20 March 1939	4 years, 159 days
4	Billy Hughes	United Australia	Lyons	Minister for Industry	20 March 1939	7 April 1939	1 year, 222 days
4	Billy Hughes	United Australia	Page	Minister for Industry	20 March 1939	26 April 1939	1 year, 222 days
4	Billy Hughes	United Australia	Menzies	Minister for Industry	26 April 1939	28 October 1940	1 year, 222 days
5	Eric Spooner	United Australia	Menzies	Minister for War Organisation of Industry	28 October 1940	28 August 1941	344 days
5	Eric Spooner	United Australia	Fadden	Minister for War Organisation of Industry	28 August 1941	7 October 1941	344 days
6	John Dedman	Labor	Curtin	Minister for War Organisation of Industry	7 October 1941	19 February 1945	3 years, 135 days
7	John McEwen	Country	Menzies	Minister for Trade and Industry	18 December 1963	21 January 1966	7 years, 49 days
7	John McEwen	Country	Holt	Minister for Trade and Industry	26 January 1966	19 December 1967	7 years, 49 days
7	John McEwen	Country	McEwen	Minister for Trade and Industry	19 December 1967	10 January 1968	7 years, 49 days
7	John McEwen	Country	Gorton	Minister for Trade and Industry	10 January 1968	5 February 1971	7 years, 49 days
8	Doug Anthony	Country	Gorton	Minister for Trade and Industry	5 February 1971	10 March 1971	1 year, 304 days
8	Doug Anthony	Country	McMahon	Minister for Trade and Industry	5 February 1971	5 December 1972	1 year, 304 days
9	Gough Whitlam	Labor	Whitlam	Minister for Trade and Industry	5 December 1972	19 December 1972	14 days
10	Jim Cairns	Labor	Whitlam	Minister for Secondary Industry	19 December 1972	9 October 1973	294 days
11	Kep Enderby	Labor	Whitlam	Minister for Secondary Industry	9 October 1973	12 June 1974	1 year, 124 days
11	Kep Enderby	Labor	Whitlam	Minister for Manufacturing Industry	12 June 1974	10 February 1975	1 year, 124 days
12	Jim McClelland	Labor	Whitlam	Minister for Manufacturing Industry	10 February 1975	6 June 1975	116 days
13	Lionel Bowen	Labor	Whitlam	Minister for Manufacturing Industry	6 June 1975	11 November 1975	158 days
14	Bob Cotton	Liberal	Fraser	Minister for Manufacturing Industry	11 November 1975	22 December 1975	2 years, 39 days
14	Bob Cotton	Liberal	Fraser	Minister for Industry and Commerce	22 December 1975	20 December 1977	2 years, 39 days
15	Phillip Lynch	Liberal	Fraser	Minister for Industry and Commerce	20 December 1977	11 October 1982	4 years, 295 days
16	Andrew Peacock	Liberal	Fraser	Minister for Industry and Commerce	11 October 1982	11 March 1983	151 days
17	John Button	Labor	Hawke	Minister for Industry and Commerce	11 March 1983	13 December 1984	10 years, 13 days
17	John Button	Labor	Hawke	Minister for Industry, Technology and Commerce	13 December 1984	20 December 1991	10 years, 13 days
17	John Button	Labor	Keating	Minister for Industry, Technology and Commerce	20 December 1991	24 March 1993	10 years, 13 days
18	Alan Griffiths	Labor	Keating	Minister for Industry, Technology and Regional Development	24 March 1993	22 January 1994	304 days
19	Peter Cook	Labor	Keating	Minister for Industry, Technology and Regional Development	30 January 1994	25 March 1994	2 years, 41 days
19	Peter Cook	Labor	Keating	Minister for Industry, Science and Technology	25 March 1994	11 March 1996	2 years, 41 days
20	John Moore	Liberal	Howard	Minister for Industry, Science and Tourism	11 March 1996	21 October 1998	2 years, 224 days
21	Nick Minchin	Liberal	Howard	Minister for Industry, Science and Resources	21 October 1998	26 November 2001	3 years, 36 days
22	Ian Macfarlane	Liberal	Howard	Minister for Industry, Tourism and Resources	26 November 2001	3 December 2007	6 years, 7 days
23	Kim Carr	Labor	Rudd	Minister for Innovation, Industry, Science and Research	3 December 2007	24 June 2010	4 years, 11 days
23	Kim Carr	Labor	Gillard	Minister for Innovation, Industry, Science and Research	24 June 2010	14 December 2011	4 years, 11 days
24	Greg Combet	Labor	Gillard	Minister for Industry and Innovation	14 December 2011	26 June 2013	1 year, 194 days
(23)	Kim Carr	Labor	Rudd	Minister for Innovation, Industry, Science and Research	26 June 2013	18 September 2013	145 days
(22)	Ian Macfarlane	Liberal	Abbott	Minister for Industry	18 September 2013	23 December 2014	2 years, 3 days
(22)	Ian Macfarlane	Liberal	Abbott	Minister for Industry and Science	23 December 2014	15 September 2015	2 years, 3 days
(22)	Ian Macfarlane	Liberal	Turnbull	Minister for Industry and Science	15 September 2015	21 September 2015	2 years, 3 days
25	Christopher Pyne	Liberal	Turnbull	Minister for Industry, Innovation and Science	21 September 2015	19 July 2016	302 days
26	Greg Hunt	Liberal	Turnbull	Minister for Industry, Innovation and Science	19 July 2016	24 January 2017	189 days
27	Arthur Sinodinos	Liberal	Turnbull	Minister for Industry, Innovation and Science	24 January 2017	20 December 2017	330 days
28	Michaelia Cash	Liberal	Turnbull	Minister for Jobs and Innovation	20 December 2017	28 August 2018	251 days
29	Karen Andrews	Liberal	Morrison	Minister for Industry, Science and Technology	28 August 2018	29 March 2021	2 years, 213 days
30	Christian Porter^{1}	Liberal	Morrison	Minister for Industry, Science and Technology	29 March 2021	19 September 2021	174 days
	Scott Morrison^{1}	Liberal	Morrison	Minister for Industry, Science, Energy and Resources	15 April 2021	23 May 2022	1 year, 38 days
31	Angus Taylor^{1}	Liberal	Morrison	Minister for Industry, Energy and Emissions Reduction	8 October 2021	23 May 2022	227 days
32	Ed Husic	Labor	Albanese	Minister for Industry and Science	1 June 2022	13 May 2025	2 years, 346 days
33	Tim Ayres	Labor	Albanese	Minister for Industry and Innovation	13 May 2025	Incumbent	1 year, 117 days

^{1} Morrison was appointed as Minister for Industry, Science, Energy and Resources by the Governor-General on Morrison's advice in April 2021, with both Morrison and Porter holding the position of Minister for Industry until September 2021, and then Morrison and Taylor until May 2022. However, the appointment of Morrison was not made public until August 2022.

== Former ministerial titles ==
=== List of ministers for commerce ===
Order	Minister	Party	Prime Minister	Title	Term start	Term end	Term in office
1	Charles Hawker	United Australia	Lyons	Minister for Commerce	13 April 1932	23 September 1932	163 days
2	Joseph Lyons	United Australia	Lyons	Minister for Commerce	3 October 1932	13 October 1932	10 days
3	Frederick Stewart	United Australia	Lyons	Minister for Commerce	13 October 1932	9 November 1934	757 days
4	Earle Page	Country	Lyons	Minister for Commerce	9 November 1934	7 April 1939	4 years, 149 days
4	Earle Page	Country	Page	Minister for Commerce	7 April 1939	26 April 1939	4 years, 149 days
5	George McLeay	United Australia	Menzies	Minister for Commerce	26 April 1939	14 March 1940	323 days
6	Archie Cameron	Country	Menzies	Minister for Commerce	14 March 1940	28 October 1940	228 days
(4)	Earle Page	Country	Menzies	Minister for Commerce	28 October 1940	29 August 1941	344 days
(4)	Earle Page	Country	Fadden	Minister for Commerce	29 August 1941	7 October 1941	344 days
7	William Scully	Labor	Curtin	Minister for Commerce	7 October 1941	22 December 1942	5 years, 25 days
7	William Scully	Labor	Curtin	Minister for Commerce and Agriculture	22 December 1942	6 July 1945	5 years, 25 days
7	William Scully	Labor	Forde	Minister for Commerce and Agriculture	6 July 1945	13 July 1945	5 years, 25 days
7	William Scully	Labor	Chifley	Minister for Commerce and Agriculture	13 July 1945	1 November 1946	5 years, 25 days
8	Reg Pollard	Labor	Chifley	Minister for Commerce and Agriculture	1 November 1946	19 December 1949	3 years, 48 days
9	John McEwen	Country	Menzies	Minister for Commerce and Agriculture	19 December 1949	11 January 1956	6 years, 23 days
10	Bob Cotton	Liberal	Fraser	Minister for Industry and Commerce	22 December 1975	20 December 1977	1 year, 363 days
11	Phillip Lynch	Liberal	Fraser	Minister for Industry and Commerce	20 December 1977	11 October 1982	4 years, 295 days
12	Andrew Peacock	Liberal	Fraser	Minister for Industry and Commerce	11 October 1982	11 March 1983	151 days
13	John Button	Labor	Hawke	Minister for Industry and Commerce	11 March 1983	13 December 1984	10 years, 13 days
13	John Button	Labor	Hawke	Minister for Industry, Technology and Commerce	13 December 1984	20 December 1991	10 years, 13 days
13	John Button	Labor	Keating	Minister for Industry, Technology and Commerce	20 December 1991	24 March 1993	10 years, 13 days

=== List of ministers for technology ===
Order	Minister	Party	Ministry	Title	Term start	Term end	Term in office
1	David Thomson	National Country	Fraser	Minister for Science and Technology	3 November 1980	16 October 1982	2 years, 128 days
1	David Thomson	National	Fraser	Minister for Science and Technology	16 October 1982	11 March 1983	2 years, 128 days
2	Barry Jones	Labor	Hawke	Minister for Science and Technology	11 March 1983	13 December 1984	1 year, 277 days
3	John Button	Labor	Hawke	Minister for Industry, Technology and Commerce	13 December 1984	20 December 1991	8 years, 101 days
3	John Button	Labor	Keating	Minister for Industry, Technology and Commerce	20 December 1991	24 March 1993	8 years, 101 days
4	Alan Griffiths	Labor	Keating	Minister for Industry, Technology and Regional Development	24 March 1993	22 January 1994	304 days
5	Peter Cook	Labor	Keating	Minister for Industry, Technology and Regional Development	30 January 1994	25 March 1994	2 years, 41 days
5	Peter Cook	Labor	Keating	Minister for Industry, Science and Technology	25 March 1994	11 March 1996	2 years, 41 days
6	Peter McGauran	National	Howard	Minister for Science and Technology	11 March 1996	26 September 1997	1 year, 199 days
7	Karen Andrews	Liberal	Morrison	Minister for Industry, Science and Technology	28 August 2018	30 March 2021	2 years, 214 days
8	Christian Porter	Liberal	Morrison	Minister for Industry, Science and Technology	30 March 2021	19 September 2021	173 days
9	Melissa Price	Liberal	Morrison	Minister for Science and Technology	8 October 2021	23 May 2022	227 days

=== List of ministers for manufacturing ===
The following individuals have been appointed as Minister for Manufacturing, or any of its precedent titles:

Order	Minister	Party	Ministry	Title	Term start	Term end	Term in office
1	Kim Carr	Labor	2nd Gillard	Minister for Manufacturing	14 December 2011	5 March 2012	82 days
2	Kate Lundy	Labor	2nd Gillard	Minister Assisting for Industry and Innovation	5 March 2012	27 June 2013	1 year, 197 days
2	Kate Lundy	Labor	Rudd	Minister Assisting for Industry and Innovation	27 June 2013	18 September 2013	1 year, 197 days

== Assistant ministers ==
=== List of industry parliamentary secretaries ===
The following individual has been appointed as parliamentary secretaries for industry, or any of its precedent titles:

Order	Assistant Minister	Party	Prime Minister	Title	Term start	Term end	Term in office
1	Warren Entsch	Liberal	Howard	Parliamentary Secretary for Industry, Science and Resources	21 October 1998	26 November 2001	7 years, 98 days
1	Warren Entsch	Liberal	Howard	Parliamentary Secretary for Industry, Tourism and Resources	26 November 2001	27 January 2006	7 years, 98 days
2	Bob Baldwin	Liberal	Howard	Parliamentary Secretary for Industry, Tourism and Resources	27 January 2006	3 December 2007	310 days
3	Richard Marles	Labor	Rudd	Parliamentary Secretary for Innovation and Industry	9 June 2009	24 June 2010	1 year, 97 days
3	Richard Marles	Labor	Gillard	Parliamentary Secretary for Innovation and Industry	24 June 2010	14 September 2010	1 year, 97 days
4	Mark Dreyfus QC	Labor	Gillard	Parliamentary Secretary for Industry and Innovation	14 December 2011	4 February 2013	1 year, 52 days
5	Yvette D'Ath	Labor	Gillard	Parliamentary Secretary for Industry and Innovation	25 March 2013	27 June 2013	177 days
5	Yvette D'Ath	Labor	Rudd	Parliamentary Secretary for Industry and Innovation	27 June 2013	18 September 2013	177 days
(2)	Bob Baldwin	Liberal	Abbott	Parliamentary Secretary to the Minister for Industry	18 September 2013	23 December 2014	310 days
6	Karen Andrews	Liberal	Abbott	Parliamentary Secretary for Industry and Science	23 December 2014	21 September 2015	1 year, 209 days
6	Karen Andrews	Liberal	Turnbull	Assistant Minister for Science	21 September 2015	19 July 2016	1 year, 209 days
7	Craig Laundy	Liberal	Turnbull	Assistant Minister for Industry, Innovation and Science	19 July 2016	20 December 2017	1 year, 154 days
8	Zed Seselja	Liberal	Turnbull	Assistant Minister for Science, Jobs and Innovation	20 December 2017	23 August 2018	246 days

=== List of assistant ministers for innovation ===
The following individuals have been appointed as assistant minister for innovation, or any of its precedent titles:

Order	Assistant Minister	Party	Prime Minister	Title	Term start	Term end	Term in office
1	Richard Marles	Labor	Rudd	Parliamentary Secretary for Innovation and Industry	9 June 2009	24 June 2010	1 year, 97 days
1	Richard Marles	Labor	Gillard	Parliamentary Secretary for Innovation and Industry	24 June 2010	14 September 2010	1 year, 97 days
2	Mark Dreyfus QC	Labor	Gillard	Parliamentary Secretary for Industry and Innovation	14 December 2011	4 February 2013	1 year, 52 days
3	Yvette D'Ath	Labor	Gillard	Parliamentary Secretary for Industry and Innovation	25 March 2013	27 June 2013	177 days
3	Yvette D'Ath	Labor	Rudd	Parliamentary Secretary for Industry and Innovation	27 June 2013	18 September 2013	177 days
4	Wyatt Roy	Liberal	Turnbull	Assistant Minister for Innovation	21 September 2015	19 July 2016	302 days
5	Craig Laundy	Liberal	Turnbull	Assistant Minister for Industry, Innovation and Science	19 July 2016	20 December 2017	1 year, 154 days
6	Zed Seselja	Liberal	Turnbull	Assistant Minister for Science, Jobs and Innovation	20 December 2017	23 August 2018	246 days

=== List of assistant ministers for manufacturing ===
The following individuals have been appointed as Assistant Minister for Manufacturing, or any of its precedent titles:

Order	Minister	Party	Ministry	Title	Term start	Term end	Term in office
1	Tim Ayres	Labor	Albanese	Assistant Minister for Manufacturing	1 June 2022	29 July 2024	2 years, 58 days
