= Craig Laundy =

Australian politician

The Honourable Craig Laundy
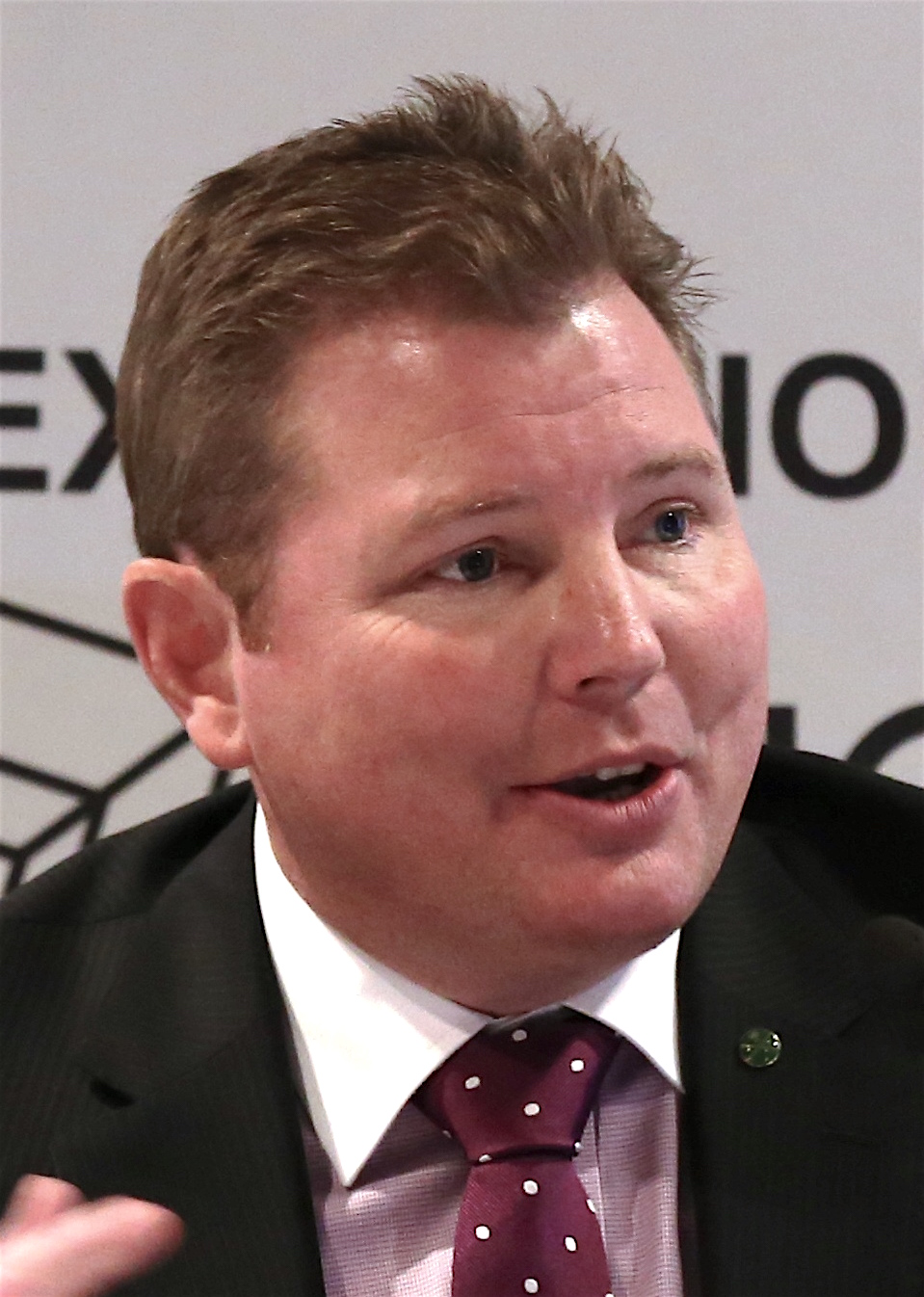

Minister for Small and Family Business, the Workplace and Deregulation
- In office 20 December 2017 – 28 August 2018
- Prime Minister: Malcolm Turnbull; Scott Morrison
- Preceded by: Michael McCormack
- Succeeded by: Michaelia Cash

Member of the Australian Parliament for Reid
- In office 7 September 2013 – 11 April 2019
- Preceded by: John Murphy
- Succeeded by: Fiona Martin

Assistant Minister for Industry, Innovation and Science
- In office 19 July 2016 – 20 December 2017
- Prime Minister: Malcolm Turnbull
- Preceded by: Karen Andrews; Wyatt Roy
- Succeeded by: Zed Seselja

Assistant Minister for Multicultural Affairs
- In office 18 February 2016 – 19 July 2016
- Prime Minister: Malcolm Turnbull
- Preceded by: Concetta Fierravanti-Wells
- Succeeded by: Zed Seselja

Personal details
- Born: 16 February 1971 (age 55) Sydney, New South Wales, Australia
- Party: Liberal Party
- Spouse: Suzie Crowe
- Children: 3
- Education: University of New South Wales
- Profession: Hotelier; Politician
- Website: craiglaundy.com.au

Craig Arthur Samuel Laundy (born 16 February 1971) is an Australian former Liberal Party politician who served as Member of Parliament for Reid from 2013 until his retirement in 2019. He served as Minister for Small and Family Business, the Workplace and Deregulation in the Second Turnbull Ministry, before resigning in August 2018 following the ousting of Malcolm Turnbull as Prime Minister. On 15 March 2019, Laundy announced he would retire from politics at the 2019 federal election.

== Early years and background ==
Laundy is the son of pub baron Arthur Laundy and his ex-wife Margaret. The family owns more than 50 pubs across New South Wales. Craig was born in Sydney and educated at St Patrick's College, Strathfield, St Joseph's College, Hunters Hill, and the University of New South Wales, from which he graduated with a Bachelor of Economics.

Prior to his election to parliament at the 2013 federal election, Laundy worked in the family hotel business.

== Political career ==
Laundy served as the Assistant Minister for Multicultural Affairs between February and July 2016 following a rearrangement in the First Turnbull Ministry and served as the Assistant Minister for Industry, Innovation and Science between July 2016 and December 2017 in the Second Turnbull Ministry. Following a subsequent rearrangement of the ministry in December 2017, he was appointed as the Minister for Small and Family Business, the Workplace and Deregulation. He resigned from the position in August 2018 following the election of Scott Morrison in a Liberal Party Leadership spill.

=== Fringe benefits tax ===
As a candidate during the 2013 federal election campaign, Laundy argued that the removal of the fringe benefits tax concession on motor vehicles would be "another kick in the pants to Australia's automotive industry."

=== Australian Broadcasting Corporation ===
In January 2014, public broadcaster, the ABC received criticism from senior members of the Coalition government, including the Defence Minister, David Johnston, and the Prime Minister Tony Abbott, who said that he feels that sometimes the ABC acts in a way that "instinctively takes everyone's side but Australia's." Laundy defended the ABC, responding that he does not defend their content, but their right to "say what they want." He said that "the beauty of living in a democracy is that if you don't like what you're hearing, what you're watching, or what you're looking at on the internet, choose another channel." He also said that it is not the role of the ABC to be patriotic.

=== Racial discrimination ===
In March 2014, the Attorney-General George Brandis proposed draft legislative amendments to the Racial Discrimination Act, 1975, seeking to remove sections that made it unlawful "to offend, insult, humiliate or intimidate another person or a group of people" on the basis of their "race, colour or national or ethnic origin." Laundy, a Liberal backbencher at the time, spoke out against the changes, saying that it was "important that we support a legislative system that reflects the diverse and multicultural country that modern Australia has become today." The changes were dropped after widespread public outrage, and opposition from some Liberal backbenchers, including Laundy, Phillip Ruddock, and Ken Wyatt, an indigenous Member of Parliament.

On 3 October 2014, Laundy joined with Labor MPs Tony Burke, Anthony Albanese, and Michelle Rowland in supporting the #NotinMyName campaign, which condemns racism, hatred, and bigotry.

=== Palestine ===
Laundy is co-chair of the Parliamentary Friends of Palestine Group. On 5 June 2014, the Abbott Government announced the term "occupied" would no longer be used to describe East Jerusalem. Laundy publicly opposed the shift in language, saying that the area was occupied by armed Israeli forces.

=== Same-sex marriage ===
Laundy does not support same-sex marriage, but had previously supported a conscience vote on the issue. In September 2014, he declared that he no longer supported a free vote. After his constituency voted in favour of same-sex marriage in the Australian Marriage Law Postal Survey, Laundy voted for the Marriage Amendment (Definition and Religious Freedoms) Act 2017, which legalised same-sex marriage in Australia.

In 2015, pro same-sex marriage activists sent unmarked letters filled with glitter to the offices of several Federal Coalition MPs. Laundy's office was briefly locked down until police determined the packages were harmless, and the activist group GetUp! issued an official apology for the stunt. Laundy labelled it a grossly irresponsible act, noting that to "send any undeclared substance through the mail to the office of a Member of Parliament will inevitably cause alarm".

=== Refugee intake ===
In 2015 Laundy was shown photographs of a dead Syrian toddler fleeing the Syrian civil war by his daughter at the dinner table, which brought him and the rest of his family to tears. Moved by the images and the unfolding crisis, Laundy called the Ministers for Foreign Affairs, Julie Bishop, and Immigration and Border Protection, Peter Dutton, canvassing an increase in the humanitarian refugee intake by Australia, especially in relation to refugees from Syria. Speaking to the media afterwards about the decision to seek asylum in the face of intense suffering and persecution, Laundy drew parallels between refugees and all of humanity, saying: "There but for the grace of God go any of us. Put yourself in the position of those people and tell me you wouldn’t do the same." Laundy was subsequently appointed as the Assistant Minister for Multicultural Affairs.

== See also ==
- Members of the Australian House of Representatives: 2013-2016; 2016-2019
- Electoral results for the Division of Reid 2013; 2016

Parliament of Australia
| Preceded by John Murphy | Member for Reid; 2013–2019 | Succeeded by Fiona Martin |
Political offices
| Preceded by Michael McCormack as Minister for Small Business | Minister for Small and Family Business, the Workplace and Deregulation; 2017–2018 | Succeeded by Michaelia Cash |
| Preceded by Karen Andrews as Assistant Minister for Science | Assistant Minister for Industry, Innovation and Science; 2016–2017 | Succeeded by Zed Seselja |
| Preceded by Wyatt Roy as Assistant Minister for Innovation | Assistant Minister for Industry, Innovation and Science; 2016–2017 | Succeeded by Zed Seselja |
| New ministerial post | Assistant Minister for Multicultural Affairs; 2016 | Succeeded by Zed Seselja |
