= Minister for Science =

Australian cabinet position

- Commonwealth Coat of Arms

- Flag of Australia

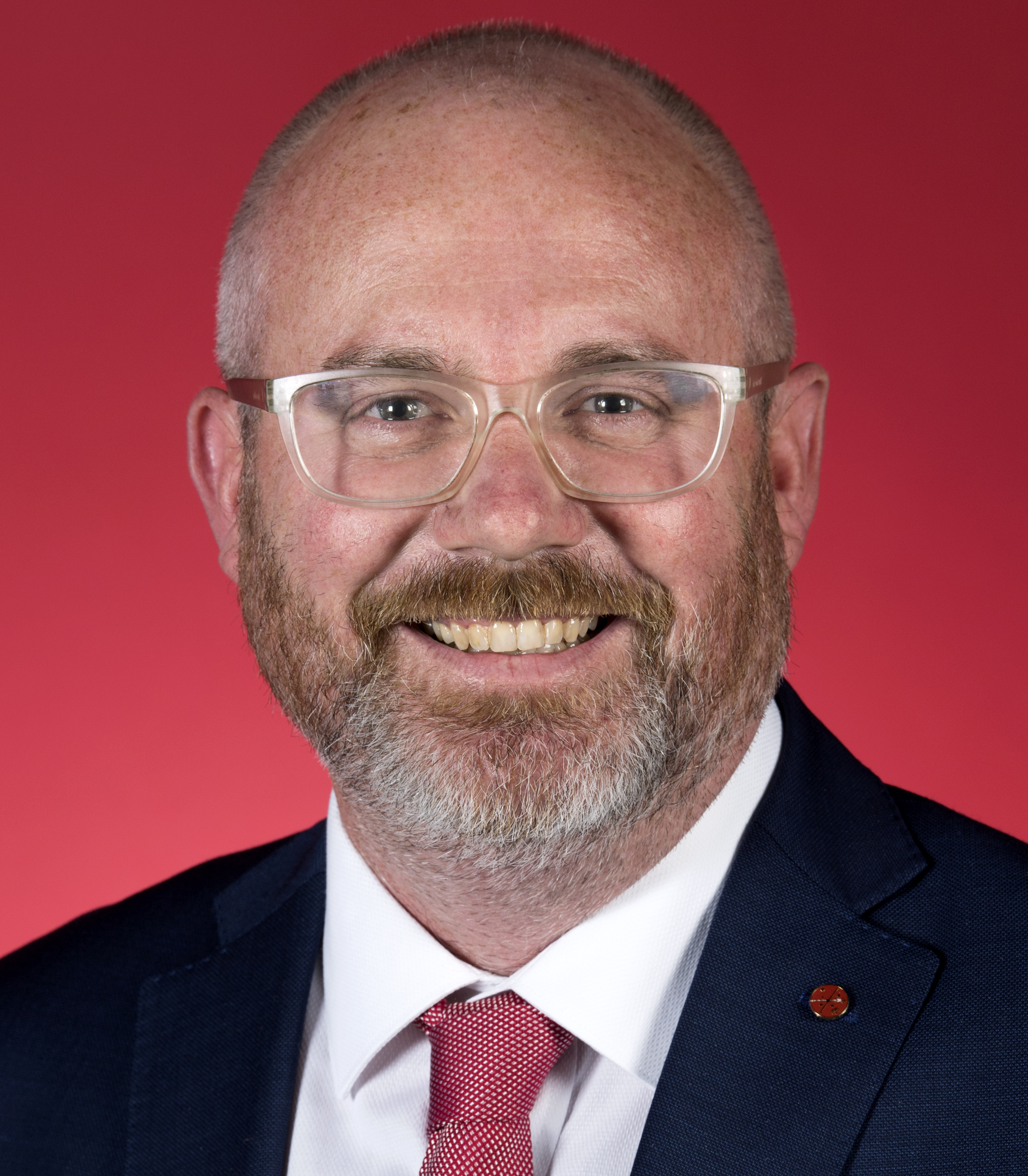
- Incumbent; Tim Ayres since 13 May 2025
- Department of Industry, Science and Resources
- Style: The Honourable
- Appointer: Governor-General on the advice of the prime minister
- Inaugural holder: Alexander McLachlan (as Minister in charge of Development and Scientific and Industrial Research)
- Formation: 6 January 1932
- Website: www.minister.industry.gov.au/ministers/timayres

The Minister for Science is an Australian Government cabinet position which is currently held by Tim Ayres following his swearing-in on 13 May 2025 as a result of Anthony Albanese's Labor government being re-elected at the 2025 Australian federal election.

In the Government of Australia, the minister administers this portfolio through the Department of Industry, Science and Resources.

== Scope ==
As of 2013 other bodies in the portfolio included:

- Australian Nuclear Science and Technology Organisation
- Australian Skills Quality Authority
- Australian Workforce and Productivity Agency
- CSIRO
- Geoscience Australia
- IP Australia
- National Advisory for Tertiary Education, Skills and Employment
- Office of the Chief Scientist
- Tertiary Education Quality and Standards Agency

The Australian Space Agency opened in Adelaide in February 2020.

== List of science ministers ==
In 1931 and from 1932 to 1937, 1940 to 1949 and 1950 to 1963 there were ministers in charge of the Council for Scientific and Industrial Research and its successors. In 1963 John Gorton was given responsibility for science (and education) generally.

Order	Minister	Party	Prime Minister	Title	Term start	Term end	Term in office
1	Jack Holloway	Labor	Scullin	Assistant Minister for Industry, Council for Scientific and Industrial Research	3 March 1931	12 June 1931	101 days
2	Alexander McLachlan	United Australia	Lyons	Minister in charge of Development and Scientific and Industrial Research	6 January 1932	29 November 1937	5 years, 327 days
3	Richard Casey	United Australia	Lyons	Minister in charge of Development and Scientific and Industrial Research	29 November 1937	7 November 1938	343 days
4	Henry Gullett	United Australia	Menzies	Minister in charge of Scientific and Industrial Research	14 March 1940	13 August 1940	121 days
5	Herbert Collett	United Australia	Menzies	Minister in charge of Scientific and Industrial Research	14 August 1940	28 October 1940	44 days
6	Harold Holt	United Australia	Menzies	Minister in charge of Scientific and Industrial Research	28 October 1940	28 August 1941	304 days
7	John Dedman	Labor	Curtin	Minister in charge of the Council for Scientific and Industrial Research	7 October 1941	6 July 1945	8 years, 73 days
7	John Dedman	Labor	Forde	Minister in charge of the Council for Scientific and Industrial Research	6 July 1945	13 July 1945	8 years, 73 days
7	John Dedman	Labor	Chifley	Minister in charge of the Council for Scientific and Industrial Research	13 July 1945	19 December 1949	8 years, 73 days
(3)	Richard Casey	Liberal	Menzies	Minister in charge of the Commonwealth Scientific and Industrial Research Organisation	23 March 1950	4 February 1960	9 years, 318 days
8	Donald Cameron	Liberal	Menzies	Minister in charge of the Commonwealth Scientific and Industrial Research Organisation	4 February 1960	22 December 1961	1 year, 322 days
9	Robert Menzies	Liberal	Menzies	Minister in charge of the Commonwealth Scientific and Industrial Research Organisation	22 December 1961	16 February 1962	56 days
10	John Gorton	Liberal	Menzies	Minister in charge of the Commonwealth Scientific and Industrial Research Organisation	16 February 1962	18 December 1963	6 years, 2 days
10	John Gorton	Liberal	Menzies	Minister in charge of Commonwealth Activities in Education and Research under the Prime Minister	18 December 1963	21 January 1966	6 years, 2 days
10	John Gorton	Liberal	Holt	Minister in charge of Commonwealth Activities in Education and Research under the Prime Minister	26 January 1966	14 December 1966	6 years, 2 days
10	John Gorton	Liberal	Holt	Minister for Education and Science	14 December 1966	19 December 1967	6 years, 2 days
10	John Gorton	Liberal	McEwen	Minister for Education and Science	19 December 1967	10 January 1968	6 years, 2 days
10	John Gorton	Liberal	Gorton	Minister for Education and Science	10 January 1968	28 February 1968	6 years, 2 days
11	Malcolm Fraser	Liberal	Gorton	Minister for Education and Science	28 February 1968	12 November 1969	1 year, 257 days
12	Nigel Bowen	Liberal	Gorton	Minister for Education and Science	12 November 1969	10 March 1971	495 days
12	Nigel Bowen	Liberal	McMahon	Minister for Education and Science	10 March 1971	22 March 1971	495 days
13	David Fairbairn	Liberal	McMahon	Minister for Education and Science	22 March 1971	20 August 1971	161 days
(11)	Malcolm Fraser	Liberal	McMahon	Minister for Education and Science	20 August 1971	5 December 1972	1 year, 107 days
14	Gough Whitlam	Labor	Whitlam	Minister for Education and Science	5 December 1972	19 December 1972	14 days
15	Bill Morrison	Labor	Whitlam	Minister for Science	19 December 1972	6 June 1975	2 years, 169 days
15	Bill Morrison	Labor	Whitlam	Minister for Science and Consumer Affairs	6 June 1975	6 June 1975	2 years, 169 days
16	Clyde Cameron	Labor	Whitlam	Minister for Science and Consumer Affairs	6 June 1975	11 November 1975	158 days
17	Bob Cotton	Liberal	Fraser	Minister for Science and Consumer Affairs	11 November 1975	22 December 1975	158 days
18	James Webster	National Country	Fraser	Minister for Science	22 December 1975	5 December 1978	3 years, 351 days
18	James Webster	National Country	Fraser	Minister for Science and the Environment	5 December 1978	8 December 1979	3 years, 351 days
19	David Thomson	National Country	Fraser	Minister for Science and the Environment	8 December 1979	3 November 1980	3 years, 93 days
19	David Thomson	National Country	Fraser	Minister for Science and Technology	3 November 1980	16 October 1982	3 years, 93 days
19	David Thomson	National	Fraser	Minister for Science and Technology	16 October 1982	11 March 1983	3 years, 93 days
20	Barry Jones	Labor	Hawke	Minister for Science and Technology	11 March 1983	13 December 1984	7 years, 24 days
20	Barry Jones	Labor	Hawke	Minister for Science	13 December 1984	24 July 1987	7 years, 24 days
20	Barry Jones	Labor	Hawke	Minister for Science and Small Business	24 July 1987	19 January 1988	7 years, 24 days
20	Barry Jones	Labor	Hawke	Minister for Science, Customs and Small Business	19 January 1988	4 April 1990	7 years, 24 days
21	Simon Crean	Labor	Hawke	Minister for Science and Technology	4 April 1990	4 June 1991	1 year, 61 days
22	Ross Free	Labor	Hawke	Minister for Science and Technology	4 June 1991	20 December 1991	2 years, 293 days
22	Ross Free	Labor	Keating	Minister for Science and Technology	20 December 1991	24 March 1993	2 years, 293 days
23	Chris Schacht	Labor	Keating	Minister for Science and Small Business	24 March 1993	25 March 1994	1 year, 1 day
24	Peter Cook	Labor	Keating	Minister for Science and Small Business	25 March 1994	11 March 1996	1 year, 352 days
25	Peter McGauran	National	Howard	Minister for Science and Technology	11 March 1996	26 September 1997	1 year, 199 days
26	John Moore	Liberal	Howard	Minister for Industry, Science and Tourism	11 March 1996	21 October 1998	2 years, 224 days
27	Nick Minchin	Liberal	Howard	Minister for Industry, Science and Resources	21 October 1998	26 November 2001	3 years, 36 days
(25)	Peter McGauran	National	Howard	Minister for Science	26 November 2001	22 October 2004	2 years, 331 days
26	Brendan Nelson	Liberal	Howard	Minister for Education, Science and Training	22 October 2004	27 January 2006	1 year, 97 days
27	Julie Bishop	Liberal	Howard	Minister for Education, Science and Training	27 January 2006	3 December 2007	1 year, 310 days
28	Kim Carr	Labor	Rudd	Minister for Innovation, Industry, Science and Research	3 December 2007	24 June 2010	4 years, 11 days
28	Kim Carr	Labor	Gillard	Minister for Innovation, Industry, Science and Research	24 June 2010	14 December 2011	4 years, 11 days
29	Chris Evans	Labor	Gillard	Minister for Tertiary Education, Skills, Science and Research	14 December 2011	2 February 2013	1 year, 50 days
30	Chris Bowen	Labor	Gillard	Minister for Tertiary Education, Skills, Science and Research	2 February 2013	22 March 2013	48 days
31	Craig Emerson	Labor	Gillard	Minister for Tertiary Education, Skills, Science and Research	25 March 2013	26 June 2013	93 days
(28)	Kim Carr	Labor	Rudd	Minister for Innovation, Industry, Science and Research	26 June 2013	18 September 2013	145 days
32	Ian Macfarlane	Liberal	Abbott	Minister for Industry and Science	23 December 2014	15 September 2015	272 days
32	Ian Macfarlane	Liberal	Turnbull	Minister for Industry and Science	15 September 2015	21 September 2015	272 days
33	Christopher Pyne	Liberal	Turnbull	Minister for Industry, Innovation and Science	21 September 2015	19 July 2016	302 days
34	Greg Hunt	Liberal	Turnbull	Minister for Industry, Innovation and Science	19 July 2016	24 January 2017	189 days
35	Arthur Sinodinos	Liberal	Turnbull	Minister for Industry, Innovation and Science	24 January 2017	20 December 2017	330 days
36	Karen Andrews	Liberal	Morrison	Minister for Industry, Science and Technology	28 August 2018	30 March 2021	2 years, 214 days
37	Christian Porter	Liberal	Morrison	Minister for Industry, Science and Technology	30 March 2021	19 September 2021	173 days
38	Melissa Price	Liberal	Morrison	Minister for Science and Technology	8 October 2021	23 May 2022	227 days
39	Ed Husic	Labor	Albanese	Minister for Industry and Science	1 June 2022	13 May 2025	2 years, 346 days
40	Tim Ayres	Labor	Albanese	Minister for Science	13 May 2025	incumbent	1 year, 117 days

== Assistant ministers ==
=== List of assistant science ministers ===
The following individual has been appointed as Assistant Minister for Science, Technology and the Digital Economy, or any of its precedent titles:

Order	Assistant Minister	Party	Prime Minister	Title	Term start	Term end	Term in office
1	Warren Entsch	Liberal	Howard	Parliamentary Secretary for Industry, Science and Resources	21 October 1998	26 November 2001	3 years, 36 days
2	Karen Andrews	Liberal	Abbott	Parliamentary Secretary for Industry and Science	23 December 2014	21 September 2015	1 year, 209 days
2	Karen Andrews	Liberal	Turnbull	Assistant Minister for Science	21 September 2015	19 July 2016	1 year, 209 days
3	Craig Laundy	Liberal	Turnbull	Assistant Minister for Industry, Innovation and Science	19 July 2016	20 December 2017	1 year, 154 days
4	Zed Seselja	Liberal	Turnbull	Assistant Minister for Science, Jobs and Innovation	20 December 2017	23 August 2018	246 days
5	Andrew Charlton	Labor	Albanese	Assistant Minister for Science, Technology and the Digital Economy	13 May 2025	incumbent	1 year, 117 days
