= Members of the Australian House of Representatives, 2013–2016 =

This is a list of members of the Australian House of Representatives of the 44th Parliament of Australia (2013–2016), as elected at the 2013 federal election. (Note: The changes to the composition of the House, in chronological order, were Rudd resigned, (Note: Former Prime Minister and Labor MP for Griffith Kevin Rudd resigned from parliament on 22 November 2013. Labor candidate Terri Butler won the seat at the Griffith by-election on 8 February 2014.) Randall died, (Note: Liberal MP for Canning Don Randall died on 21 July 2015. Liberal candidate Andrew Hastie won the seat at the Canning by-election on 19 September 2015.) Hockey resigned, (Note: Former Treasurer and Liberal MP for North Sydney Joe Hockey resigned from parliament on 23 October 2015. Liberal candidate Trent Zimmerman won the seat at the North Sydney by-election on 5 December 2015.) Jensen expelled from Liberal Party. (Note: Dennis Jensen, the Liberal MP for Tangney, lost party preselection to contest the electorate in April 2016. On 9 May 2016, he announced that he would run as an independent and was consequently expelled from the Liberal Party.))

Member	Party	Electorate	State	In office
Tony Abbott	Liberal	Warringah	NSW	1994–2019
Anthony Albanese	Labor	Grayndler	NSW	1996–present
John Alexander	Liberal	Bennelong	NSW	2010–2017
Karen Andrews	Liberal (Note: Member of the Liberal National Party of Queensland (LNP) who sat in Liberal party room.)	McPherson	Qld	2010–2025
Kevin Andrews	Liberal	Menzies	Vic	1991–2022
Bob Baldwin	Liberal	Paterson	NSW	1996–1998, 2001–2016
Adam Bandt	Greens	Melbourne	Vic	2010–2025
Bruce Billson	Liberal	Dunkley	Vic	1996–2016
Sharon Bird	Labor	Cunningham	NSW	2004–2022
Bronwyn Bishop	Liberal	Mackellar	NSW	1994–2016
Julie Bishop	Liberal	Curtin	WA	1998–2019
Chris Bowen	Labor	McMahon	NSW	2004–present
Jamie Briggs	Liberal	Mayo	SA	2008–2016
Andrew Broad	National	Mallee	Vic	2013–2019
Russell Broadbent	Liberal	McMillan	Vic	1990–1993, 1996–1998, 2004–2025
Gai Brodtmann	Labor	Canberra	ACT	2010–2019
Mal Brough	Liberal	Fisher	Qld	1996–2007, 2013–2016
Scott Buchholz	Liberal	Wright	Qld	2010–present
Anna Burke	Labor	Chisholm	Vic	1998–2016
Tony Burke	Labor	Watson	NSW	2004–present
Mark Butler	Labor	Port Adelaide	SA	2007–present
Terri Butler	Labor	Griffith	Qld	2014–2022
Anthony Byrne	Labor	Holt	Vic	1999–2022
Jim Chalmers	Labor	Rankin	Qld	2013–present
Nick Champion	Labor	Wakefield	SA	2007–2022
Darren Chester	National	Gippsland	Vic	2008–present
Lisa Chesters	Labor	Bendigo	Vic	2013–present
George Christensen	National (Note: Member of the Liberal National Party of Queensland (LNP) who sat in National party room.)	Dawson	Qld	2010–2022
Steven Ciobo	Liberal	Moncrieff	Qld	2001–2019
Jason Clare	Labor	Blaxland	NSW	2007–present
Sharon Claydon	Labor	Newcastle	NSW	2013–present
John Cobb	National	Calare	NSW	2001–2016
David Coleman	Liberal	Banks	NSW	2013–2025
Julie Collins	Labor	Franklin	Tas	2007–present
Pat Conroy	Labor	Charlton	NSW	2013–present
Mark Coulton	National	Parkes	NSW	2007–2025
Michael Danby	Labor	Melbourne Ports	Vic	1998–2019
Mark Dreyfus	Labor	Isaacs	Vic	2007–present
Peter Dutton	Liberal	Dickson	Qld	2001–2025
Justine Elliot	Labor	Richmond	NSW	2004–present
Kate Ellis	Labor	Adelaide	SA	2004–2019
Warren Entsch	Liberal	Leichhardt	Qld	1996–2007, 2010–2025
David Feeney	Labor	Batman	Vic	2013–2018
Laurie Ferguson	Labor	Werriwa	NSW	1990–2016
Joel Fitzgibbon	Labor	Hunter	NSW	1996–2022
Paul Fletcher	Liberal	Bradfield	NSW	2009–2025
Josh Frydenberg	Liberal	Kooyong	Vic	2010–2022
Teresa Gambaro	Liberal	Brisbane	Qld	1996–2007, 2010–2016
Andrew Giles	Labor	Scullin	Vic	2013–present
David Gillespie	National	Lyne	NSW	2013–2025
Ian Goodenough	Liberal	Moore	WA	2013–2025
Gary Gray	Labor	Brand	WA	2007–2016
Alan Griffin	Labor	Bruce	Vic	1993–2016
Natasha Griggs	Country Liberal (Note: Sat in Liberal party room.)	Solomon	NT	2010–2016
Jill Hall	Labor	Shortland	NSW	1998–2016
Luke Hartsuyker	National	Cowper	NSW	2001–2019
Andrew Hastie	Liberal	Canning	WA	2015–present
Alex Hawke	Liberal	Mitchell	NSW	2007–present
Chris Hayes	Labor	Fowler	NSW	2005–2022
Sarah Henderson	Liberal	Corangamite	Vic	2013–2019
Peter Hendy	Liberal	Eden-Monaro	NSW	2013–2016
Joe Hockey	Liberal	North Sydney	NSW	1996–2015
Kevin Hogan	National	Page	NSW	2013–present
Luke Howarth	Liberal	Petrie	Qld	2013–2025
Greg Hunt	Liberal	Flinders	Vic	2001–2022
Ed Husic	Labor	Chifley	NSW	2010–present
Eric Hutchinson	Liberal	Lyons	Tas	2013–2016
Steve Irons	Liberal	Swan	WA	2007–2022
Dennis Jensen	Liberal/Independent	Tangney	WA	2004–2016
Ewen Jones	Liberal	Herbert	Qld	2010–2016
Stephen Jones	Labor	Throsby	NSW	2010–2025
Barnaby Joyce	National	New England	NSW	2013–present
Bob Katter	Katter's Australian	Kennedy	Qld	1993–present
Michael Keenan	Liberal	Stirling	WA	2004–2019
Craig Kelly	Liberal	Hughes	NSW	2010–2022
Catherine King	Labor	Ballarat	Vic	2001–present
Andrew Laming	Liberal	Bowman	Qld	2004–2022
Michelle Landry	National	Capricornia	Qld	2013–present
Craig Laundy	Liberal	Reid	NSW	2013–2019
Andrew Leigh	Labor	Fraser	ACT	2010–present
Sussan Ley	Liberal	Farrer	NSW	2001–2026
Ian Macfarlane	Liberal	Groom	Qld	1998–2016
Jenny Macklin	Labor	Jagajaga	Vic	1996–2019
Alannah MacTiernan	Labor	Perth	WA	2013–2016
Nola Marino	Liberal	Forrest	WA	2007–2025
Louise Markus	Liberal	Macquarie	NSW	2004–2016
Richard Marles	Labor	Corio	Vic	2007–present
Russell Matheson	Liberal	Macarthur	NSW	2010–2016
Michael McCormack	National	Riverina	NSW	2010–present
Cathy McGowan	Independent	Indi	Vic	2013–2019
Karen McNamara	Liberal	Dobell	NSW	2013–2016
Rob Mitchell	Labor	McEwen	Vic	2010–present
Scott Morrison	Liberal	Cook	NSW	2007–2024
Shayne Neumann	Labor	Blair	Qld	2007–present
Andrew Nikolic	Liberal	Bass	Tas	2013–2016
Brendan O'Connor	Labor	Gorton	Vic	2001–2025
Ken O'Dowd	National	Flynn	Qld	2010–2022
Kelly O'Dwyer	Liberal	Higgins	Vic	2009–2019
Clare O'Neil	Labor	Hotham	Vic	2013–present
Julie Owens	Labor	Parramatta	NSW	2004–2022
Clive Palmer	Palmer United	Fairfax	Qld	2013–2016
Melissa Parke	Labor	Fremantle	WA	2007–2016
Tony Pasin	Liberal	Barker	SA	2013–present
Graham Perrett	Labor	Moreton	Qld	2007–2025
Keith Pitt	National	Hinkler	Qld	2013–2025
Tanya Plibersek	Labor	Sydney	NSW	1998–present
Christian Porter	Liberal	Pearce	WA	2013–2022
Jane Prentice	Liberal	Ryan	Qld	2010–2019
Melissa Price	Liberal	Durack	WA	2013–present
Christopher Pyne	Liberal	Sturt	SA	1993–2019
Rowan Ramsey	Liberal	Grey	SA	2007–2025
Don Randall	Liberal	Canning	WA	1996–1998, 2001–2015
Bernie Ripoll	Labor	Oxley	Qld	1998–2016
Amanda Rishworth	Labor	Kingston	SA	2007–present
Andrew Robb	Liberal	Goldstein	Vic	2004–2016
Stuart Robert	Liberal	Fadden	Qld	2007–2023
Michelle Rowland	Labor	Greenway	NSW	2010–present
Wyatt Roy	Liberal	Longman	Qld	2010–2016
Kevin Rudd	Labor	Griffith	Qld	1998–2013
Philip Ruddock	Liberal	Berowra	NSW	1973–2016
Joanne Ryan	Labor	Lalor	Vic	2013–present
Bruce Scott	National	Maranoa	Qld	1990–2016
Fiona Scott	Liberal	Lindsay	NSW	2013–2016
Bill Shorten	Labor	Maribyrnong	Vic	2007–2025
Luke Simpkins	Liberal	Cowan	WA	2007–2016
Tony Smith	Liberal	Casey	Vic	2001–2022
Warren Snowdon	Labor	Lingiari	NT	1987–1996, 1998–2022
Andrew Southcott	Liberal	Boothby	SA	1996–2016
Sharman Stone	Liberal	Murray	Vic	1996–2016
Ann Sudmalis	Liberal	Gilmore	NSW	2013–2019
Michael Sukkar	Liberal	Deakin	Vic	2013–2025
Wayne Swan	Labor	Lilley	Qld	1993–1996, 1998–2019
Angus Taylor	Liberal	Hume	NSW	2013–present
Dan Tehan	Liberal	Wannon	Vic	2010–present
Matt Thistlethwaite	Labor	Kingsford Smith	NSW	2013–present
Kelvin Thomson	Labor	Wills	Vic	1996–2016
Warren Truss	National	Wide Bay	Qld	1990–2016
Alan Tudge	Liberal	Aston	Vic	2010–2023
Malcolm Turnbull	Liberal	Wentworth	NSW	2004–2018
Maria Vamvakinou	Labor	Calwell	Vic	2001–2025
Bert van Manen	Liberal	Forde	Qld	2010–2025
Nickolas Varvaris	Liberal	Barton	NSW	2013–2016
Ross Vasta	Liberal	Bonner	Qld	2004–2007, 2010–2025
Tim Watts	Labor	Gellibrand	Vic	2013–present
Brett Whiteley	Liberal	Braddon	Tas	2013–2016
Lucy Wicks	Liberal	Robertson	NSW	2013–2022
Andrew Wilkie	Independent	Denison	Tas	2010–present
Matt Williams	Liberal	Hindmarsh	SA	2013–2016
Rick Wilson	Liberal	O'Connor	WA	2013–present
Jason Wood	Liberal	La Trobe	Vic	2004–2010, 2013–present
Ken Wyatt	Liberal	Hasluck	WA	2010–2022
Tony Zappia	Labor	Makin	SA	2007–present
Trent Zimmerman	Liberal	North Sydney	NSW	2015–2022
