= Pre-election pendulum for the next Australian federal election =

The Australian Labor Party won the 2025 federal election in a landslide, securing 94 of 150 seats in the House of Representatives, while the Coalition won 43 seats. In the aftermath of the election, the National Party of Australia twice withdrew from its coalition agreement with the Liberal Party, most notably in January 2026 when all Nationals frontbenchers resigned following a dispute over the government's hate speech laws, describing the relationship as “untenable.”

== Seat classification ==
The Australian Electoral Commission classifies seats as marginal, fairly safe or safe based on the winning party's two-candidate-preferred vote: less than 56% is classified as marginal, 56–60% as fairly safe, and more than 60% as safe.

== Mackerras pendulum ==
The Mackerras pendulum, devised by Australian psephologist Malcolm Mackerras, is a method for analysing elections in two-party, Westminster-style lower house systems such as the Australian House of Representatives. Seats held by the government, the opposition and the crossbenches are ordered by their two-candidate-preferred (2CP) margin, representing the uniform swing required for each seat to change hands. Under the assumption of a uniform swing, the pendulum can be used to estimate the number of seats likely to change hands between elections.

== Pendulum (2CP) ==
Government (94 seats)
Marginal (22)
Bean	ACT	David Smith	ALP v IND	0.34
Bullwinkel	WA	Trish Cook	ALP	0.51
Fremantle	WA	Josh Wilson	ALP v IND	0.69
Menzies	Vic	Gabriel Ng	ALP	1.08
Petrie	Qld	Emma Comer	ALP	1.17
Solomon	NT	Luke Gosling	ALP	1.31
Bendigo	Vic	Lisa Chesters	ALP v NAT	1.40
Wills	Vic	Peter Khalil	ALP v GRN	1.43
Forde	Qld	Rowan Holzberger	ALP	1.77
Banks	NSW	Zhi Soon	ALP	2.39
Deakin	Vic	Matt Gregg	ALP	2.82
Moore	WA	Tom French	ALP	2.89
Melbourne	Vic	Sarah Witty	ALP v GRN	3.02
Hughes	NSW	David Moncrieff	ALP	3.06
Aston	Vic	Mary Doyle	ALP	3.43
McEwen	Vic	Rob Mitchell	ALP	4.76
Bonner	Qld	Kara Cook	ALP	5.00
Calwell	Vic	Basem Abdo	ALP v IND	5.08
Gilmore	NSW	Fiona Phillips	ALP	5.13
Chisholm	Vic	Carina Garland	ALP	5.70
Blair	Qld	Shayne Neumann	ALP	5.71
Dickson	Qld	Ali France	ALP	5.99
Fairly safe (24)
Leichhardt	Qld	Matt Smith	ALP	6.06
Whitlam	NSW	Carol Berry	ALP	6.25
Pearce	WA	Tracey Roberts	ALP	6.44
Sturt	SA	Claire Clutterham	ALP	6.62
Werriwa	NSW	Anne Stanley	ALP	6.77
Paterson	NSW	Meryl Swanson	ALP	6.89
Tangney	WA	Sam Lim	ALP	6.99
Dunkley	Vic	Jodie Belyea	ALP	7.08
Braddon	Tas	Anne Urquhart	ALP	7.20
Eden-Monaro	NSW	Kristy McBain	ALP	7.21
Hawke	Vic	Sam Rae	ALP	7.63
Macquarie	NSW	Susan Templeman	ALP	7.71
Franklin	Tas	Julie Collins	ALP v IND	7.78
Bass	Tas	Jess Teesdale	ALP	8.01
Corangamite	Vic	Libby Coker	ALP	8.05
Lingiari	NT	Marion Scrymgour	ALP	8.13
Brisbane	Qld	Madonna Jarrett	ALP	8.96
McMahon	NSW	Chris Bowen	ALP	9.02
Hunter	NSW	Daniel Repacholi	ALP v ONP	9.04
Fraser	Vic	Daniel Mulino	ALP v GRN	9.23
Bennelong	NSW	Jerome Laxale	ALP	9.26
Robertson	NSW	Gordon Reid	ALP	9.37
Dobell	NSW	Emma McBride	ALP	9.43
Cooper	Vic	Ged Kearney	ALP v GRN	9.72
Safe (48)
Richmond	NSW	Justine Elliot	ALP	10.00
Gorton	Vic	Alice Jordan-Baird	ALP	10.28
Griffith	Qld	Renee Coffey	ALP v GRN	10.57
Ballarat	Vic	Catherine King	ALP	10.66
Boothby	SA	Louise Miller-Frost	ALP	11.10
Shortland	NSW	Pat Conroy	ALP	11.51
Lyons	Tas	Rebecca White	ALP	11.58
Macnamara	Vic	Josh Burns	ALP	11.80
Reid	NSW	Sally Sitou	ALP	12.01
Parramatta	NSW	Andrew Charlton	ALP	12.55
Maribyrnong	Vic	Jo Briskey	ALP	12.65
Jagajaga	Vic	Kate Thwaites	ALP	12.88
Lalor	Vic	Joanne Ryan	ALP	13.21
Corio	Vic	Richard Marles	ALP	13.23
Cowan	WA	Anne Aly	ALP	13.63
Greenway	NSW	Michelle Rowland	ALP	13.76
Swan	WA	Zaneta Mascarenhas	ALP	13.99
Holt	Vic	Cassandra Fernando	ALP	14.03
Scullin	Vic	Andrew Giles	ALP	14.29
Isaacs	Vic	Mark Dreyfus	ALP	14.34
Lilley	Qld	Anika Wells	ALP	14.52
Bruce	Vic	Julian Hill	ALP	14.62
Makin	SA	Tony Zappia	ALP	14.66
Gellibrand	Vic	Tim Watts	ALP	15.10
Spence	SA	Matt Burnell	ALP	15.34
Rankin	Qld	Jim Chalmers	ALP	15.55
Macarthur	NSW	Mike Freelander	ALP	15.61
Burt	WA	Matt Keogh	ALP	15.71
Newcastle	NSW	Sharon Claydon	ALP v GRN	15.80
Hasluck	WA	Tania Lawrence	ALP	15.97
Barton	NSW	Ash Ambihaipahar	ALP	16.00
Moreton	Qld	Julie-Ann Campbell	ALP	16.09
Hindmarsh	SA	Mark Butler	ALP	16.35
Perth	WA	Patrick Gorman	ALP	16.51
Watson	NSW	Tony Burke	ALP v IND	16.52
Hotham	Vic	Clare O'Neil	ALP	16.86
Grayndler	NSW	Anthony Albanese	ALP v GRN	16.86
Brand	WA	Madeleine King	ALP	16.92
Kingsford Smith	NSW	Matt Thistlethwaite	ALP	17.19
Cunningham	NSW	Alison Byrnes	ALP	17.52
Adelaide	SA	Steve Georganas	ALP	19.07
Oxley	Qld	Milton Dick	ALP	19.19
Canberra	ACT	Alicia Payne	ALP v GRN	19.52
Chifley	NSW	Ed Husic	ALP	19.83
Kingston	SA	Amanda Rishworth	ALP	20.74
Sydney	NSW	Tanya Plibersek	ALP v GRN	20.95
Blaxland	NSW	Jason Clare	ALP	21.90
Fenner	ACT	Andrew Leigh	ALP	22.08

Opposition (42 seats)
Marginal (18)
Goldstein	Vic	Tim Wilson	LIB v IND	0.08
Longman	Qld	Terry Young	LNP	0.11
Berowra	NSW	Julian Leeser	LIB	1.63
La Trobe	Vic	Jason Wood	LIB	2.06
Forrest	WA	Ben Small	LIB	2.24
Flinders	Vic	Zoe McKenzie	LIB v IND	2.29
Bowman	Qld	Henry Pike	LNP	2.43
Cowper	NSW	Pat Conaghan	NAT v IND	2.54
Lindsay	NSW	Melissa McIntosh	LIB	2.78
Casey	Vic	Aaron Violi	LIB	2.89
Fairfax	Qld	Ted O'Brien	LNP	3.23
Wannon	Vic	Dan Tehan	LIB v IND	3.27
Mitchell	NSW	Alex Hawke	LIB	3.81
Monash	Vic	Mary Aldred	LIB	4.09
McPherson	Qld	Leon Rebello	LNP	4.44
Grey	SA	Tom Venning	LIB	4.64
Groom	Qld	Garth Hamilton	LNP v IND	5.67
Capricornia	Qld	Michelle Landry	LNP	5.83
Fairly safe (12)
Fisher	Qld	Andrew Wallace	LNP	6.03
Hinkler	Qld	David Batt	LNP	6.26
Canning	WA	Andrew Hastie	LIB	6.55
Fadden	Qld	Cameron Caldwell	LNP	6.88
Cook	NSW	Simon Kennedy	LIB	7.19
Wide Bay	Qld	Llew O'Brien	LNP	7.63
Wright	Qld	Scott Buchholz	LNP	7.98
Hume	NSW	Angus Taylor	LIB	8.06
Moncrieff	Qld	Angie Bell	LNP	8.80
Page	NSW	Kevin Hogan	NAT	9.29
Lyne	NSW	Alison Penfold	NAT	9.78
Safe (12)
Durack	WA	Melissa Price	LIB	10.15
Flynn	Qld	Colin Boyce	LNP	10.24
Dawson	Qld	Andrew Willcox	LNP	11.83
Riverina	NSW	Michael McCormack	NAT	12.62
Parkes	NSW	Jamie Chaffey	NAT	12.97
Barker	SA	Tony Pasin	LIB	12.98
O'Connor	WA	Rick Wilson	LIB	13.28
Herbert	Qld	Phillip Thompson	LNP	13.41
Nicholls	Vic	Sam Birrell	NAT	14.38
Mallee	Vic	Anne Webster	NAT	19.04
Gippsland	Vic	Darren Chester	NAT	19.36
Maranoa	Qld	David Littleproud	LNP v ONP	20.10

Crossbench (14 seats)
Marginal (6)
Bradfield	NSW	Nicolette Boele	IND v LIB	0.01
Kooyong	Vic	Monique Ryan	IND v LIB	0.67
Fowler	NSW	Dai Le	IND v ALP	2.68
Ryan	Qld	Elizabeth Watson-Brown	GRN v LNP	3.27
Curtin	WA	Kate Chaney	IND v LIB	3.27
Mackellar	NSW	Sophie Scamps	IND v LIB	5.66
Fairly safe (3)
Calare	NSW	Andrew Gee	IND v NAT	6.78
Farrer	NSW	David Farley	ONP v IND (b/e)	7.72
Wentworth	NSW	Allegra Spender (CSA)	IND v LIB	8.34 (Note: Allegra Spender and Zali Steggall were both elected as teal independents but subsequently formed and joined Community Strong Australia in June 2026.)
Indi	Vic	Helen Haines	IND v LIB	8.64
Safe (5)
Warringah	NSW	Zali Steggall (CSA)	IND v LIB	11.20
Mayo	SA	Rebekha Sharkie	CA v ALP	14.89
Kennedy	Qld	Bob Katter	KAP v LNP	15.75
New England	NSW	Barnaby Joyce (ONP)	NAT	17.06 (Note: Barnaby Joyce was elected as a member of the National Party of Australia at the 2025 Australian federal election but subsequently left the party to join Pauline Hanson's One Nation in December.)
Clark	Tas	Andrew Wilkie	IND v ALP	20.38
