= Post-election pendulum for the 2025 Australian federal election =

The Australian Labor Party won the 2025 federal election in a landslide, winning 94 of 150 seats in the House of Representatives. The Coalition won 43 seats.

Classification of seats as marginal, fairly safe or safe is applied by the independent Australian Electoral Commission using the following definition: "Where a winning party receives less than 56% of the vote, the seat is classified as 'marginal', 56–60% is classified as 'fairly safe' and more than 60% is considered 'safe'." Here, 'the vote' is defined as the vote after preferences, where the distribution of preferences has continued to the point where there are only 2 candidates left.

In the Opposition Seats table, blue is used for both the Liberal party and members of the LNP who caucus with the Liberal party room, while green is used for both the National party and members of the LNP who caucus with the National party room.

The Mackerras pendulum was devised by the Australian psephologist Malcolm Mackerras as a way of predicting the outcome of an election contested between two major parties in a Westminster-style lower house legislature such as the Australian House of Representatives, which is composed of single-member electorates and uses a preferential voting system such as a Condorcet method or instant-runoff voting.

The pendulum works by lining up the seats held in Parliament for the government, the opposition and the crossbenches according to the percentage point margin by which they are held on a two-candidate preferred (2CP) basis. That is also known as the swing that is required for the seat to change hands. With a uniform swing to the opposition or government parties, the number of seats changing hands can be predicted.

== Pendulum (2CP) ==
Government (94 seats)
Marginal (22)
Bean	ACT	David Smith	ALP v IND	0.34
Bullwinkel	WA	Trish Cook	ALP	0.51
Fremantle	WA	Josh Wilson	ALP v IND	0.69
Menzies	Vic	Gabriel Ng	ALP	1.08
Petrie	Qld	Emma Comer	ALP	1.17
Solomon	NT	Luke Gosling	ALP	1.31
Bendigo	Vic	Lisa Chesters	ALP v NAT	1.40
Wills	Vic	Peter Khalil	ALP v GRN	1.43
Forde	Qld	Rowan Holzberger	ALP	1.77
Banks	NSW	Zhi Soon	ALP	2.39
Deakin	Vic	Matt Gregg	ALP	2.82
Moore	WA	Tom French	ALP	2.89
Melbourne	Vic	Sarah Witty	ALP v GRN	3.02
Hughes	NSW	David Moncrieff	ALP	3.06
Aston	Vic	Mary Doyle	ALP	3.43
McEwen	Vic	Rob Mitchell	ALP	4.76
Bonner	Qld	Kara Cook	ALP	5.00
Calwell	Vic	Basem Abdo	ALP v IND	5.08
Gilmore	NSW	Fiona Phillips	ALP	5.13
Chisholm	Vic	Carina Garland	ALP	5.70
Blair	Qld	Shayne Neumann	ALP	5.71
Dickson	Qld	Ali France	ALP	5.99
Fairly safe (24)
Leichhardt	Qld	Matt Smith	ALP	6.06
Whitlam	NSW	Carol Berry	ALP	6.25
Pearce	WA	Tracey Roberts	ALP	6.44
Sturt	SA	Claire Clutterham	ALP	6.62
Werriwa	NSW	Anne Stanley	ALP	6.77
Paterson	NSW	Meryl Swanson	ALP	6.89
Tangney	WA	Sam Lim	ALP	6.99
Dunkley	Vic	Jodie Belyea	ALP	7.08
Braddon	Tas	Anne Urquhart	ALP	7.20
Eden-Monaro	NSW	Kristy McBain	ALP	7.21
Hawke	Vic	Sam Rae	ALP	7.63
Macquarie	NSW	Susan Templeman	ALP	7.71
Franklin	Tas	Julie Collins	ALP v IND	7.78
Bass	Tas	Jess Teesdale	ALP	8.01
Corangamite	Vic	Libby Coker	ALP	8.05
Lingiari	NT	Marion Scrymgour	ALP	8.13
Brisbane	Qld	Madonna Jarrett	ALP	8.96
McMahon	NSW	Chris Bowen	ALP	9.02
Hunter	NSW	Daniel Repacholi	ALP v ONP	9.04
Fraser	Vic	Daniel Mulino	ALP v GRN	9.23
Bennelong	NSW	Jerome Laxale	ALP	9.26
Robertson	NSW	Gordon Reid	ALP	9.37
Dobell	NSW	Emma McBride	ALP	9.43
Cooper	Vic	Ged Kearney	ALP v GRN	9.72
Safe (48)
Richmond	NSW	Justine Elliot	ALP	10.00
Gorton	Vic	Alice Jordan-Baird	ALP	10.28
Griffith	Qld	Renee Coffey	ALP v GRN	10.57
Ballarat	Vic	Catherine King	ALP	10.66
Boothby	SA	Louise Miller-Frost	ALP	11.10
Shortland	NSW	Pat Conroy	ALP	11.51
Lyons	Tas	Rebecca White	ALP	11.58
Macnamara	Vic	Josh Burns	ALP	11.80
Reid	NSW	Sally Sitou	ALP	12.01
Parramatta	NSW	Andrew Charlton	ALP	12.55
Maribyrnong	Vic	Jo Briskey	ALP	12.65
Jagajaga	Vic	Kate Thwaites	ALP	12.88
Lalor	Vic	Joanne Ryan	ALP	13.21
Corio	Vic	Richard Marles	ALP	13.23
Cowan	WA	Anne Aly	ALP	13.63
Greenway	NSW	Michelle Rowland	ALP	13.76
Swan	WA	Zaneta Mascarenhas	ALP	13.99
Holt	Vic	Cassandra Fernando	ALP	14.03
Scullin	Vic	Andrew Giles	ALP	14.29
Isaacs	Vic	Mark Dreyfus	ALP	14.34
Lilley	Qld	Anika Wells	ALP	14.52
Bruce	Vic	Julian Hill	ALP	14.62
Makin	SA	Tony Zappia	ALP	14.66
Gellibrand	Vic	Tim Watts	ALP	15.10
Spence	SA	Matt Burnell	ALP	15.34
Rankin	Qld	Jim Chalmers	ALP	15.55
Macarthur	NSW	Mike Freelander	ALP	15.61
Burt	WA	Matt Keogh	ALP	15.71
Newcastle	NSW	Sharon Claydon	ALP v GRN	15.80
Hasluck	WA	Tania Lawrence	ALP	15.97
Barton	NSW	Ash Ambihaipahar	ALP	16.00
Moreton	Qld	Julie-Ann Campbell	ALP	16.09
Hindmarsh	SA	Mark Butler	ALP	16.35
Perth	WA	Patrick Gorman	ALP	16.51
Watson	NSW	Tony Burke	ALP v IND	16.52
Hotham	Vic	Clare O'Neil	ALP	16.86
Grayndler	NSW	Anthony Albanese	ALP v GRN	16.86
Brand	WA	Madeleine King	ALP	16.92
Kingsford Smith	NSW	Matt Thistlethwaite	ALP	17.19
Cunningham	NSW	Alison Byrnes	ALP	17.52
Adelaide	SA	Steve Georganas	ALP	19.07
Oxley	Qld	Milton Dick	ALP	19.19
Canberra	ACT	Alicia Payne	ALP v GRN	19.52
Chifley	NSW	Ed Husic	ALP	19.83
Very safe (4)
Kingston	SA	Amanda Rishworth	ALP	20.74
Sydney	NSW	Tanya Plibersek	ALP v GRN	20.95
Blaxland	NSW	Jason Clare	ALP	21.90
Fenner	ACT	Andrew Leigh	ALP	22.08

Opposition (43 seats)
Marginal (18)
Goldstein	Vic	Tim Wilson	LIB v IND	0.08
Longman	Qld	Terry Young	LNP	0.11
Berowra	NSW	Julian Leeser	LIB	1.63
La Trobe	Vic	Jason Wood	LIB	2.06
Forrest	WA	Ben Small	LIB	2.24
Flinders	Vic	Zoe McKenzie	LIB v IND	2.29
Bowman	Qld	Henry Pike	LNP	2.43
Cowper	NSW	Pat Conaghan	NAT v IND	2.54
Lindsay	NSW	Melissa McIntosh	LIB	2.78
Casey	Vic	Aaron Violi	LIB	2.89
Fairfax	Qld	Ted O'Brien	LNP	3.23
Wannon	Vic	Dan Tehan	LIB v IND	3.27
Mitchell	NSW	Alex Hawke	LIB	3.81
Monash	Vic	Mary Aldred	LIB	4.09
McPherson	Qld	Leon Rebello	LNP	4.44
Grey	SA	Tom Venning	LIB	4.64
Groom	Qld	Garth Hamilton	LNP v IND	5.67
Capricornia	Qld	Michelle Landry	LNP	5.83
Fairly safe (12)
Fisher	Qld	Andrew Wallace	LNP	6.03
Farrer	NSW	Sussan Ley	LIB v IND	6.19
Hinkler	Qld	David Batt	LNP	6.26
Canning	WA	Andrew Hastie	LIB	6.55
Fadden	Qld	Cameron Caldwell	LNP	6.88
Cook	NSW	Simon Kennedy	LIB	7.19
Wide Bay	Qld	Llew O'Brien	LNP	7.63
Wright	Qld	Scott Buchholz	LNP	7.98
Hume	NSW	Angus Taylor	LIB	8.06
Moncrieff	Qld	Angie Bell	LNP	8.80
Page	NSW	Kevin Hogan	NAT	9.29
Lyne	NSW	Alison Penfold	NAT	9.78
Safe (13)
Durack	WA	Melissa Price	LIB	10.15
Flynn	Qld	Colin Boyce	LNP	10.24
Dawson	Qld	Andrew Willcox	LNP	11.83
Riverina	NSW	Michael McCormack	NAT	12.62
Parkes	NSW	Jamie Chaffey	NAT	12.97
Barker	SA	Tony Pasin	LIB	12.98
O'Connor	WA	Rick Wilson	LIB	13.28
Herbert	Qld	Phillip Thompson	LNP	13.41
Nicholls	Vic	Sam Birrell	NAT	14.38
New England	NSW	Barnaby Joyce	NAT	17.06
Mallee	Vic	Anne Webster	NAT	19.04
Gippsland	Vic	Darren Chester	NAT	19.36
Maranoa	Qld	David Littleproud	LNP v ONP	20.10

Crossbench (13 seats)
Marginal (6)
Bradfield	NSW	Nicolette Boele	IND v LIB	0.01
Kooyong	Vic	Monique Ryan	IND v LIB	0.67
Fowler	NSW	Dai Le	IND v ALP	2.68
Ryan	Qld	Elizabeth Watson-Brown	GRN v LNP	3.27
Curtin	WA	Kate Chaney	IND v LIB	3.27
Mackellar	NSW	Sophie Scamps	IND v LIB	5.66
Fairly safe (3)
Calare	NSW	Andrew Gee	IND v NAT	6.78
Wentworth	NSW	Allegra Spender	IND v LIB	8.34
Indi	Vic	Helen Haines	IND v LIB	8.64
Safe (4)
Warringah	NSW	Zali Steggall	IND v LIB	11.20
Mayo	SA	Rebekha Sharkie	CA v ALP	14.89
Kennedy	Qld	Bob Katter	KAP v LNP	15.75
Clark	Tas	Andrew Wilkie	IND v ALP	20.38

=== Analysis ===
- Labor increased its majority significantly, securing 94 seats, up from 77 in 2022.
- The Coalition dropped to 43 seats, continuing its downward trend.
- The crossbench decreased slightly to 13 seats, down from 16, despite maintaining influence in key electorates.

== Pendulum (2PP) ==
Separate to the two-candidate preferred (2CP) vote, the two-party preferred (2PP) vote is calculated in all seats. In "non-classic seats" (seats where a major party fails to reach the 2CP count of which there were 35 at this election), the 2PP figure differs to the 2CP figure (in classic seats, the 2CP and 2PP are the same). The 2PP figures in the non-classic seats allow for the calculation of the nationwide 2PP vote.

Labor (100 seats)
Marginal
Bullwinkel	WA	Trish Cook	ALP	0.51
Wentworth	NSW	Allegra Spender (IND)	ALP	0.56
Menzies	Vic	Gabriel Ng	ALP	1.08
Petrie	Qld	Emma Comer	ALP	1.17
Solomon	NT	Luke Gosling	ALP	1.31
Bendigo	Vic	Lisa Chesters	ALP	1.40
Forde	Qld	Rowan Holzberger	ALP	1.77
Banks	NSW	Zhi Soon	ALP	2.39
Deakin	Vic	Matt Gregg	ALP	2.82
Moore	WA	Tom French	ALP	2.89
Hughes	NSW	David Moncrieff	ALP	3.06
Aston	Vic	Mary Doyle	ALP	3.43
Warringah	NSW	Zali Steggall (IND)	ALP	4.51
McEwen	Vic	Rob Mitchell	ALP	4.76
Mayo	SA	Rebekha Sharkie (CA)	ALP	4.98
Bonner	Qld	Kara Cook	ALP	5.00
Gilmore	NSW	Fiona Phillips	ALP	5.13
Chisholm	Vic	Carina Garland	ALP	5.70
Blair	Qld	Shayne Neumann	ALP	5.71
Dickson	Qld	Ali France	ALP	5.99
Fairly safe
Leichhardt	Qld	Matt Smith	ALP	6.06
Whitlam	NSW	Carol Berry	ALP	6.25
Pearce	WA	Tracey Roberts	ALP	6.44
Sturt	SA	Claire Clutterham	ALP	6.62
Werriwa	NSW	Anne Stanley	ALP	6.77
Paterson	NSW	Meryl Swanson	ALP	6.89
Tangney	WA	Sam Lim	ALP	6.99
Dunkley	Vic	Jodie Belyea	ALP	7.08
Braddon	Tas	Anne Urquhart	ALP	7.20
Eden-Monaro	NSW	Kristy McBain	ALP	7.21
Hawke	Vic	Sam Rae	ALP	7.63
Macquarie	NSW	Susan Templeman	ALP	7.71
Ryan	Qld	Elizabeth Watson-Brown (GRN)	ALP	7.82
Bass	Tas	Jess Teesdale	ALP	8.01
Corangamite	Vic	Libby Coker	ALP	8.05
Lingiari	NT	Marion Scrymgour	ALP	8.13
Brisbane	Qld	Madonna Jarrett	ALP	8.96
McMahon	NSW	Chris Bowen	ALP	9.02
Bennelong	NSW	Jerome Laxale	ALP	9.26
Robertson	NSW	Gordon Reid	ALP	9.37
Dobell	NSW	Emma McBride	ALP	9.43
Hunter	NSW	Daniel Repacholi	ALP	9.48
Safe
Richmond	NSW	Justine Elliot	ALP	10.00
Gorton	Vic	Alice Jordan-Baird	ALP	10.28
Ballarat	Vic	Catherine King	ALP	10.66
Boothby	SA	Louise Miller-Frost	ALP	11.10
Shortland	NSW	Pat Conroy	ALP	11.51
Lyons	Tas	Rebecca White	ALP	11.58
Macnamara	Vic	Josh Burns	ALP	11.80
Reid	NSW	Sally Sitou	ALP	12.01
Parramatta	NSW	Andrew Charlton	ALP	12.55
Maribyrnong	Vic	Jo Briskey	ALP	12.65
Jagajaga	Vic	Kate Thwaites	ALP	12.88
Lalor	Vic	Joanne Ryan	ALP	13.21
Corio	Vic	Richard Marles	ALP	13.23
Cowan	WA	Anne Aly	ALP	13.63
Greenway	NSW	Michelle Rowland	ALP	13.76
Swan	WA	Zaneta Mascarenhas	ALP	13.99
Holt	Vic	Cassandra Fernando	ALP	14.03
Scullin	Vic	Andrew Giles	ALP	14.29
Isaacs	Vic	Mark Dreyfus	ALP	14.34
Lilley	Qld	Anika Wells	ALP	14.52
Bruce	Vic	Julian Hill	ALP	14.62
Makin	SA	Tony Zappia	ALP	14.66
Calwell	Vic	Basem Abdo	ALP	14.71
Gellibrand	Vic	Tim Watts	ALP	15.10
Spence	SA	Matt Burnell	ALP	15.34
Rankin	Qld	Jim Chalmers	ALP	15.55
Macarthur	NSW	Mike Freelander	ALP	15.61
Burt	WA	Matt Keogh	ALP	15.71
Griffith	Qld	Renee Coffey	ALP	15.94
Hasluck	WA	Tania Lawrence	ALP	15.97
Barton	NSW	Ash Ambihaipahar	ALP	16.00
Moreton	Qld	Julie-Ann Campbell	ALP	16.09
Hindmarsh	SA	Mark Butler	ALP	16.35
Perth	WA	Patrick Gorman	ALP	16.51
Hotham	Vic	Clare O'Neil	ALP	16.86
Brand	WA	Madeleine King	ALP	16.92
Kingsford Smith	NSW	Matt Thistlethwaite	ALP	17.19
Cunningham	NSW	Alison Byrnes	ALP	17.52
Fowler	NSW	Dai Le (IND)	ALP	18.19
Fremantle	WA	Josh Wilson	ALP	18.68
Adelaide	SA	Steve Georganas	ALP	19.07
Oxley	Qld	Milton Dick	ALP	19.19
Bean	ACT	David Smith	ALP	19.29
Franklin	Tas	Julie Collins	ALP	19.44
Chifley	NSW	Ed Husic	ALP	19.83
Kingston	SA	Amanda Rishworth	ALP	20.74
Newcastle	NSW	Sharon Claydon	ALP	20.79
Clark	Tas	Andrew Wilkie (IND)	ALP	20.89
Blaxland	NSW	Jason Clare	ALP	21.90
Fraser	Vic	Daniel Mulino	ALP	22.02
Fenner	ACT	Andrew Leigh	ALP	22.08
Watson	NSW	Tony Burke	ALP	22.86
Melbourne	Vic	Sarah Witty	ALP	23.97
Canberra	ACT	Alicia Payne	ALP	26.42
Sydney	NSW	Tanya Plibersek	ALP	28.08
Cooper	Vic	Ged Kearney	ALP	28.53
Grayndler	NSW	Anthony Albanese	ALP	30.18
Wills	Vic	Peter Khalil	ALP	30.86

Liberal/National (50 seats)
Marginal
Longman	Qld	Terry Young	LIB	0.11
Berowra	NSW	Julian Leeser	LIB	1.63
La Trobe	Vic	Jason Wood	LIB	2.06
Curtin	WA	Kate Chaney (IND)	LIB	2.16
Forrest	WA	Ben Small	LIB	2.24
Kooyong	Vic	Monique Ryan (IND)	LIB	2.37
Bowman	Qld	Henry Pike	LIB	2.43
Lindsay	NSW	Melissa McIntosh	LIB	2.78
Casey	Vic	Aaron Violi	LIB	2.89
Fairfax	Qld	Ted O'Brien	LIB	3.23
Mackellar	NSW	Sophie Scamps (IND)	LIB	3.66
Mitchell	NSW	Alex Hawke	LIB	3.81
Goldstein	Vic	Tim Wilson	LIB	3.97
Monash	Vic	Mary Aldred	LIB	4.09
McPherson	Qld	Leon Rebello	LIB	4.44
Grey	SA	Tom Venning	LIB	4.64
Flinders	Vic	Zoe McKenzie	LIB	4.78
Bradfield	NSW	Nicolette Boele (IND)	LIB	4.95
Capricornia	Qld	Michelle Landry	NAT	5.83
Fairly safe
Fisher	Qld	Andrew Wallace	LIB	6.03
Hinkler	Qld	David Batt	NAT	6.26
Canning	WA	Andrew Hastie	LIB	6.55
Indi	Vic	Helen Haines (IND)	LIB	6.66
Fadden	Qld	Cameron Caldwell	LIB	6.88
Cook	NSW	Simon Kennedy	LIB	7.19
Wide Bay	Qld	Llew O'Brien	NAT	7.63
Wright	Qld	Scott Buchholz	LIB	7.98
Hume	NSW	Angus Taylor	LIB	8.06
Moncrieff	Qld	Angie Bell	LIB	8.80
Cowper	NSW	Pat Conaghan	NAT	9.08
Page	NSW	Kevin Hogan	NAT	9.29
Kennedy	Qld	Bob Katter (KAP)	NAT	9.32
Lyne	NSW	Alison Penfold	NAT	9.78
Safe
Durack	WA	Melissa Price	LIB	10.15
Flynn	Qld	Colin Boyce	NAT	10.24
Wannon	Vic	Dan Tehan	LIB	10.92
Dawson	Qld	Andrew Willcox	NAT	11.83
Calare	NSW	Andrew Gee (IND)	NAT	12.26
Riverina	NSW	Michael McCormack	NAT	12.62
Farrer	NSW	Sussan Ley	LIB	12.89
Parkes	NSW	Jamie Chaffey	NAT	12.97
Barker	SA	Tony Pasin	LIB	12.98
O'Connor	WA	Rick Wilson	LIB	13.28
Groom	Qld	Garth Hamilton	LIB	13.35
Herbert	Qld	Phillip Thompson	LIB	13.41
Nicholls	Vic	Sam Birrell	NAT	14.38
New England	NSW	Barnaby Joyce	NAT	17.06
Mallee	Vic	Anne Webster	NAT	19.04
Gippsland	Vic	Darren Chester	NAT	19.36
Maranoa	Qld	David Littleproud	NAT	23.96

== Seats changing 2CP classification ==
- Includes gains.

Seat	Party		Swing (to winner)
Seat	2022	2025	Swing (to winner)
Aston (VIC)	Liberal	Labor	+5.8
Banks (NSW)	Liberal	Labor	+4.6
Bass (TAS)	Liberal	Labor	+9.4
Bean (ACT)	Labor	Labor	−12.7
Bendigo (VIC)	Labor	Labor	−9.9
Bennelong (NSW)	Liberal	Labor	+9.3
Berowra (NSW)	Liberal	Liberal	−5.7
Blaxland (NSW)	Labor	Labor	+8.9
Bonner (QLD)	Liberal National	Labor	+8.3
Boothby (SA)	Labor	Labor	+7.4
Braddon (TAS)	Liberal	Labor	+15.3
Bradfield (NSW)	Liberal	Independent	+3.4
Brisbane (QLD)	Greens	Labor	+58.5
Bruce (VIC)	Labor	Labor	+9.3
Calare (NSW)	National	Independent	+56.2
Capricornia (QLD)	Liberal National	Liberal National	−1.0
Cook (NSW)	Liberal	Liberal	−4.0
Cowan (WA)	Labor	Labor	+3.7
Deakin (VIC)	Liberal	Labor	+3.0
Dickson (QLD)	Liberal National	Labor	+7.2
Fairfax (QLD)	Liberal National	Liberal National	−5.1
Farrer (NSW)	Liberal	Liberal	−10.2
Fenner (ACT)	Labor	Labor	+5.7
Flinders (VIC)	Liberal	Liberal	−4.2
Flynn (QLD)	Liberal National	Liberal National	+5.9
Forde (QLD)	Liberal National	Labor	+5.7
Franklin (TAS)	Labor	Labor	−5.9
Fraser (VIC)	Labor	Labor	−7.6
Fremantle (WA)	Labor	Labor	−16.3
Goldstein (VIC)	Independent	Liberal	+3.9
Greenway (NSW)	Labor	Labor	+4.6
Grey (SA)	Liberal	Liberal	−5.3
Griffith (QLD)	Greens	Labor	+60.5
Groom (QLD)	Liberal National	Liberal National	−1.1
Hinkler (QLD)	Liberal National	Liberal National	−3.7
Holt (VIC)	Labor	Labor	+6.9
Hughes (NSW)	Liberal	Labor	+5.8
Hunter (NSW)	Labor	Labor	+4.3
Isaacs (VIC)	Labor	Labor	+5.1
Kingston (SA)	Labor	Labor	+4.7
La Trobe (VIC)	Liberal	Liberal	−5.5
Leichhardt (QLD)	Liberal National	Labor	+9.5
Lindsay (NSW)	Liberal	Liberal	−3.0
Lingiari (NT)	Labor	Labor	+7.1
Lyons (TAS)	Labor	Labor	+10.7
Macarthur (NSW)	Labor	Labor	+6.0
McPherson (QLD)	Liberal National	Liberal National	−4.2
Melbourne (VIC)	Greens	Labor	+9.3
Mitchell (NSW)	Liberal	Liberal	−5.9
Moncrieff (QLD)	Liberal National	Liberal National	−1.6
Moore (WA)	Liberal	Labor	+3.7
Moreton (QLD)	Labor	Labor	+7.0
O'Connor (WA)	Liberal	Liberal	+7.3
Parramatta (NSW)	Labor	Labor	+9.0
Paterson (NSW)	Labor	Labor	+4.1
Petrie (QLD)	Liberal National	Labor	+5.4
Rankin (QLD)	Labor	Labor	+6.2
Reid (NSW)	Labor	Labor	+6.8
Riverina (NSW)	National	National	+3.4
Robertson (NSW)	Labor	Labor	+7.1
Ryan (QLD)	Greens	Greens	+3.5
Shortland (NSW)	Labor	Labor	+5.4
Solomon (NT)	Labor	Labor	−7.3
Sturt (SA)	Liberal	Labor	+6.7
Swan (WA)	Labor	Labor	+4.9
Sydney (NSW)	Labor	Labor	+4.9
Tangney (WA)	Labor	Labor	+3.6
Wentworth (NSW)	Liberal	Independent	+8.9
Wide Bay (QLD)	Liberal National	Liberal National	−2.8
Wills (VIC)	Labor	Labor	−7.6
Wright (QLD)	Liberal National	Liberal National	−2.0
