= Post-election pendulum for the 2019 Australian federal election =

The Coalition won the 2019 federal election with a three-seat majority of 77 of 151 lower house seats. Labor holds 68 seats, and crossbenchers hold the remaining six.

Classification of seats as marginal, fairly safe or safe is applied by the independent Australian Electoral Commission using the following definition: "Where a winning party receives less than 56% of the vote, the seat is classified as 'marginal', 56–60% is classified as 'fairly safe' and more than 60% is considered 'safe'."

== Pendulum ==
The Mackerras pendulum was devised by the Australian psephologist Malcolm Mackerras as a way of predicting the outcome of an election contested between two major parties in a Westminster-style lower house legislature such as the Australian House of Representatives, which is composed of single-member electorates and uses a preferential voting system such as a Condorcet method or instant-runoff voting.

The pendulum works by lining up the seats held in Parliament for the government, the opposition and the crossbenches according to the percentage point margin by which they are held on a two-party preferred basis. That is also known as the swing that is required for the seat to change hands. With a uniform swing to the opposition or government parties, the number of seats changing hands can be predicted.

Government seats (77)
Marginal
Bass (TAS)	Bridget Archer	LIB	0.4
Chisholm (VIC)	Gladys Liu	LIB	0.6
Wentworth (NSW)	Dave Sharma	LIB v IND	1.3
Boothby (SA)	Nicolle Flint	LIB	1.4
Swan (WA)	Steve Irons	LIB	2.7
Braddon (TAS)	Gavin Pearce	LIB	3.1
Reid (NSW)	Fiona Martin	LIB	3.2
Longman (QLD)	Terry Young	LNP	3.3
Higgins (VIC)	Katie Allen	LIB	3.9
Leichhardt (QLD)	Warren Entsch	LNP	4.2
Robertson (NSW)	Lucy Wicks	LIB	4.2
La Trobe (VIC)	Jason Wood	LIB	4.5
Dickson (QLD)	Peter Dutton	LNP	4.6
Casey (VIC)	Tony Smith	LIB	4.6
Deakin (VIC)	Michael Sukkar	LIB	4.8
Brisbane (QLD)	Trevor Evans	LNP	4.9
Lindsay (NSW)	Melissa McIntosh	LIB	5.0
Hasluck (WA)	Ken Wyatt	LIB	5.4
Flinders (VIC)	Greg Hunt	LIB	5.6
Stirling (WA)	Vince Connelly	LIB	5.6
Kooyong (VIC)	Josh Frydenberg	LIB v GRN	5.7
Fairly safe
Ryan (QLD)	Julian Simmonds	LNP	6.0
Banks (NSW)	David Coleman	LIB	6.3
Cowper (NSW)	Pat Conaghan	NAT v IND	6.8
Sturt (SA)	James Stevens	LIB	6.9
Bennelong (NSW)	John Alexander	LIB	6.9
Monash (VIC)	Russell Broadbent	LIB	7.4
Bonner (QLD)	Ross Vasta	LNP	7.4
Pearce (WA)	Christian Porter	LIB	7.5
Menzies (VIC)	Kevin Andrews	LIB	7.5
Goldstein (VIC)	Tim Wilson	LIB	7.8
Herbert (QLD)	Phillip Thompson	LNP	8.4
Petrie (QLD)	Luke Howarth	LNP	8.4
Forde (QLD)	Bert van Manen	LNP	8.6
Flynn (QLD)	Ken O'Dowd	LNP	8.7
North Sydney (NSW)	Trent Zimmerman	LIB	9.3
Page (NSW)	Kevin Hogan	NAT	9.4
Hughes (NSW)	Craig Kelly	LIB	9.8
Safe
Aston (VIC)	Alan Tudge	LIB	10.1
Bowman (QLD)	Andrew Laming	LNP	10.2
Wannon (VIC)	Dan Tehan	LIB	10.4
Farrer (NSW)	Sussan Ley	LIB v IND	10.9
Tangney (WA)	Ben Morton	LIB	11.5
Canning (WA)	Andrew Hastie	LIB	11.6
Moore (WA)	Ian Goodenough	LIB	11.7
McPherson (QLD)	Karen Andrews	LNP	12.2
Capricornia (QLD)	Michelle Landry	LNP	12.3
Fisher (QLD)	Andrew Wallace	LNP	12.7
Hume (NSW)	Angus Taylor	LIB	13.0
Wide Bay (QLD)	Llew O'Brien	LNP	13.1
Mackellar (NSW)	Jason Falinski	LIB	13.2
Calare (NSW)	Andrew Gee	NAT	13.3
Grey (SA)	Rowan Ramsey	LIB	13.3
Fairfax (QLD)	Ted O'Brien	LNP	13.4
Fadden (QLD)	Stuart Robert	LNP	14.2
Curtin (WA)	Celia Hammond	LIB	14.3
New England (NSW)	Barnaby Joyce	NAT v IND	14.4
O'Connor (WA)	Rick Wilson	LIB	14.5
Hinkler (QLD)	Keith Pitt	LNP	14.5
Forrest (WA)	Nola Marino	LIB	14.6
Wright (QLD)	Scott Buchholz	LNP	14.6
Dawson (QLD)	George Christensen	LNP	14.6
Durack (WA)	Melissa Price	LIB	14.8
Lyne (NSW)	David Gillespie	NAT	15.2
Moncrieff (QLD)	Angie Bell	LNP	15.4
Berowra (NSW)	Julian Leeser	LIB	15.6
Mallee (VIC)	Anne Webster	NAT	16.2
Bradfield (NSW)	Paul Fletcher	LIB	16.6
Gippsland (VIC)	Darren Chester	NAT	16.7
Parkes (NSW)	Mark Coulton	NAT	16.9
Mitchell (NSW)	Alex Hawke	LIB	18.6
Barker (SA)	Tony Pasin	LIB	18.9
Cook (NSW)	Scott Morrison	LIB	19.0
Riverina (NSW)	Michael McCormack	NAT	19.5
Nicholls (VIC)	Damian Drum	NAT	20.0
Groom (QLD)	John McVeigh	LNP	20.5
Maranoa (QLD)	David Littleproud	LNP v ONP	22.5

Opposition seats (68)
Marginal
Macquarie (NSW)	Susan Templeman	ALP	0.2
Lilley (QLD)	Anika Wells	ALP	0.6
Cowan (WA)	Anne Aly	ALP	0.8
Eden-Monaro (NSW)	Mike Kelly	ALP	0.8
Corangamite (VIC)	Libby Coker	ALP	1.1
Blair (QLD)	Shayne Neumann	ALP	1.2
Dobell (NSW)	Emma McBride	ALP	1.5
Moreton (QLD)	Graham Perrett	ALP	1.9
Gilmore (NSW)	Fiona Phillips	ALP	2.6
Dunkley (VIC)	Peta Murphy	ALP	2.7
Greenway (NSW)	Michelle Rowland	ALP	2.8
Griffith (QLD)	Terri Butler	ALP	2.9
Hunter (NSW)	Joel Fitzgibbon	ALP	3.0
Solomon (NT)	Luke Gosling	ALP	3.1
Parramatta (NSW)	Julie Owens	ALP	3.5
Richmond (NSW)	Justine Elliot	ALP	4.1
Shortland (NSW)	Pat Conroy	ALP	4.4
Perth (WA)	Patrick Gorman	ALP	4.9
Burt (WA)	Matt Keogh	ALP	5.0
McEwen (VIC)	Rob Mitchell	ALP	5.0
Paterson (NSW)	Meryl Swanson	ALP	5.0
Lyons (TAS)	Brian Mitchell	ALP	5.2
Lingiari (NT)	Warren Snowdon	ALP	5.5
Werriwa (NSW)	Anne Stanley	ALP	5.5
Hotham (VIC)	Clare O'Neil	ALP	5.9
Fairly safe
Macnamara (VIC)	Josh Burns	ALP	6.2
Oxley (QLD)	Milton Dick	ALP	6.4
Isaacs (VIC)	Mark Dreyfus	ALP	6.4
Rankin (QLD)	Jim Chalmers	ALP	6.4
Hindmarsh (SA)	Mark Butler	ALP	6.5
Jagajaga (VIC)	Kate Thwaites	ALP	6.6
McMahon (NSW)	Chris Bowen	ALP	6.6
Brand (WA)	Madeleine King	ALP	6.7
Fremantle (WA)	Josh Wilson	ALP	6.9
Bean (ACT)	David Smith	ALP	7.5
Wills (VIC)	Peter Khalil	ALP v GRN	8.2
Adelaide (SA)	Steve Georganas	ALP	8.2
Macarthur (NSW)	Mike Freelander	ALP	8.4
Holt (VIC)	Anthony Byrne	ALP	8.7
Kingsford Smith (NSW)	Matt Thistlethwaite	ALP	8.8
Bendigo (VIC)	Lisa Chesters	ALP	9.0
Barton (NSW)	Linda Burney	ALP	9.4
Makin (SA)	Tony Zappia	ALP	9.7
Safe
Corio (VIC)	Richard Marles	ALP	10.3
Fenner (ACT)	Andrew Leigh	ALP	10.6
Whitlam (NSW)	Stephen Jones	ALP	10.9
Ballarat (VIC)	Catherine King	ALP	11.0
Maribyrnong (VIC)	Bill Shorten	ALP	11.2
Kingston (SA)	Amanda Rishworth	ALP	11.9
Franklin (TAS)	Julie Collins	ALP	12.2
Chifley (NSW)	Ed Husic	ALP	12.4
Lalor (VIC)	Joanne Ryan	ALP	12.4
Cunningham (NSW)	Sharon Bird	ALP	13.4
Watson (NSW)	Tony Burke	ALP	13.5
Newcastle (NSW)	Sharon Claydon	ALP	13.8
Fowler (NSW)	Chris Hayes	ALP	14.0
Spence (SA)	Nick Champion	ALP	14.1
Bruce (VIC)	Julian Hill	ALP	14.2
Fraser (VIC)	Daniel Mulino	ALP	14.2
Cooper (VIC)	Ged Kearney	ALP v GRN	14.6
Blaxland (NSW)	Jason Clare	ALP	14.7
Gellibrand (VIC)	Tim Watts	ALP	14.8
Gorton (VIC)	Brendan O'Connor	ALP	15.4
Grayndler (NSW)	Anthony Albanese	ALP v GRN	16.3
Canberra (ACT)	Alicia Payne	ALP	17.1
Sydney (NSW)	Tanya Plibersek	ALP	18.7
Calwell (VIC)	Maria Vamvakinou	ALP	18.8
Scullin (VIC)	Andrew Giles	ALP	21.7
Crossbench seats (6)
Indi (VIC)	Helen Haines	IND v LIB	1.4
Mayo (SA)	Rebekha Sharkie	CA v LIB	5.1
Warringah (NSW)	Zali Steggall	IND v LIB	7.2
Kennedy (Qld)	Bob Katter	KAP v LNP	13.3
Melbourne (VIC)	Adam Bandt	GRN v LIB	21.8
Clark (TAS)	Andrew Wilkie	IND v ALP	22.1
