= Pre-election pendulum for the 2022 Australian federal election =

Post-election pendulum for the 2022 Australian federal election

The Mackerras pendulum was devised by the Australian psephologist Malcolm Mackerras as a way of predicting the outcome of an election contested between two major parties in a Westminster style lower house legislature such as the Australian House of Representatives, which is composed of single-member electorates and which uses a preferential voting system such as a Condorcet method or IRV.

The pendulum works by lining up all of the seats held in Parliament for the government, the opposition and the crossbenches according to the percentage point margin they are held by on a two party preferred basis. This is also known as the swing required for the seat to change hands. Given a uniform swing to the opposition or government parties, the number of seats that change hands can be predicted.

Classification of seats as marginal, fairly safe or safe is applied by the independent Australian Electoral Commission using the following definition: "Where a winning party receives less than 56% of the vote, the seat is classified as 'marginal', 56–60% is classified as 'fairly safe' and more than 60% is considered 'safe'."

This Mackerras pendulum includes new notional margin estimates in Victoria and Western Australia due to boundary redistributions. Members in italics have declared they will not contest their seats at the election, or have lost their party's preselection.

Government seats (76)
Marginal
Bass	Tas	Bridget Archer	LIB	0.4
Chisholm	Vic	Gladys Liu	LIB	0.5
Wentworth	NSW	Dave Sharma	LIB vs. IND	1.3
Boothby	SA	Nicolle Flint	LIB	1.4
Braddon	Tas	Gavin Pearce	LIB	3.1
Reid	NSW	Fiona Martin	LIB	3.2
Longman	Qld	Terry Young	LNP	3.3
Swan	WA	Steve Irons	LIB	3.3
Higgins	Vic	Katie Allen	LIB	3.7
Leichhardt	Qld	Warren Entsch	LNP	4.2
Robertson	NSW	Lucy Wicks	LIB	4.2
Casey	Vic	Tony Smith	LIB	4.6
Dickson	Qld	Peter Dutton	LNP	4.6
Deakin	Vic	Michael Sukkar	LIB	4.7
Brisbane	Qld	Trevor Evans	LNP	4.9
Lindsay	NSW	Melissa McIntosh	LIB	5.0
Pearce	WA	Christian Porter	LIB	5.2
La Trobe	Vic	Jason Wood	LIB	5.5
Flinders	Vic	Greg Hunt	LIB	5.6
Kooyong	Vic	Josh Frydenberg	LIB vs. GRN	5.6
Hasluck	WA	Ken Wyatt	LIB	5.8
Fairly safe
Ryan	Qld	Julian Simmonds	LNP	6.0
Banks	NSW	David Coleman	LIB	6.3
Cowper	NSW	Pat Conaghan	NAT vs. IND	6.8
Sturt	SA	James Stevens	LIB	6.9
Monash	Vic	Russell Broadbent	LIB	6.9
Bennelong	NSW	John Alexander	LIB	6.9
Menzies	Vic	Kevin Andrews	LIB	7.0
Bonner	Qld	Ross Vasta	LNP	7.4
Goldstein	Vic	Tim Wilson	LIB	7.8
Herbert	Qld	Phillip Thompson	LIB	8.4
Petrie	Qld	Luke Howarth	LNP	8.4
Forde	Qld	Bert Van Manen	LNP	8.6
Flynn	Qld	Ken O'Dowd	LNP	8.7
North Sydney	NSW	Trent Zimmerman	LIB	9.3
Page	NSW	Kevin Hogan	NAT	9.4
Tangney	WA	Ben Morton	LIB	9.5
Hughes	NSW	Craig Kelly	LIB	9.9
Safe
Aston	Vic	Alan Tudge	LIB	10.1
Wannon	Vic	Dan Tehan	LIB	10.2
Bowman	Qld	Andrew Laming	LNP	10.2
Farrer	NSW	Sussan Ley	LIB vs. IND	10.9
Canning	WA	Andrew Hastie	LIB	11.6
Moore	WA	Ian Goodenough	LIB	11.6
McPherson	Qld	Karen Andrews	LNP	12.2
Capricornia	Qld	Michelle Landry	LNP	12.4
Fisher	Qld	Andrew Wallace	LNP	12.7
Hume	NSW	Angus Taylor	LIB	13.0
Wide Bay	Qld	Llew O'Brien	LNP	13.1
Mackellar	NSW	Jason Falinski	LIB	13.2
Calare	NSW	Andrew Gee	NAT	13.3
Grey	SA	Rowan Ramsey	LIB	13.3
Fairfax	Qld	Ted O'Brien	LNP	13.4
Durack	WA	Melissa Price	LIB	13.5
Curtin	WA	Celia Hammond	LIB	14.0
Fadden	Qld	Stuart Robert	LNP	14.2
New England	NSW	Barnaby Joyce	NAT vs. IND	14.4
Hinkler	Qld	Keith Pitt	LNP	14.5
Dawson	Qld	George Christensen	LNP	14.6
Forrest	WA	Nola Marino	LIB	14.6
Wright	Qld	Scott Buchholz	LNP	14.6
Lyne	NSW	David Gillespie	NAT	15.2
Moncrieff	Qld	Angie Bell	LNP	15.4
O'Connor	WA	Rick Wilson	LIB	15.4
Berowra	NSW	Julian Leeser	LIB	15.6
Mallee	Vic	Anne Webster	NAT	15.7
Bradfield	NSW	Paul Fletcher	LIB	16.6
Gippsland	Vic	Darren Chester	NAT	16.7
Parkes	NSW	Mark Coulton	NAT	16.9
Groom	Qld	Garth Hamilton	LNP (b/e)	17.2
Mitchell	NSW	Alex Hawke	LIB	18.6
Barker	SA	Tony Pasin	LIB	18.9
Cook	NSW	Scott Morrison	LIB	19.0
Riverina	NSW	Michael McCormack	NAT	19.5
Nicholls	Vic	Damian Drum	NAT	20.0
Maranoa	Qld	David Littleproud	LNP vs PHON	22.5

Opposition seats (69)
Marginal
Macquarie	NSW	Susan Templeman	ALP	0.2
Eden-Monaro	NSW	Kristy McBain	ALP (b/e)	0.4
Lilley	Qld	Anika Wells	ALP	0.6
Cowan	WA	Anne Aly	ALP	0.9
Corangamite	Vic	Libby Coker	ALP	1.0
Blair	Qld	Shayne Neumann	ALP	1.2
Dobell	NSW	Emma McBride	ALP	1.5
Moreton	Qld	Graham Perrett	ALP	1.9
Gilmore	NSW	Fiona Phillips	ALP	2.6
Dunkley	Vic	Peta Murphy	ALP	2.7
Greenway	NSW	Michelle Rowland	ALP	2.8
Griffith	Qld	Terri Butler	ALP	2.9
Hunter	NSW	Joel Fitzgibbon	ALP	3.0
Solomon	NT	Luke Gosling	ALP	3.1
Perth	WA	Patrick Gorman	ALP	3.2
Parramatta	NSW	Julie Owens	ALP	3.5
Richmond	NSW	Justine Elliot	ALP	4.1
Shortland	NSW	Pat Conroy	ALP	4.4
Paterson	NSW	Meryl Swanson	ALP	5.0
Lyons	Tas	Brian Mitchell	ALP	5.2
McEwen	Vic	Rob Mitchell	ALP	5.3
Burt	WA	Matt Keogh	ALP	5.4
Lingiari	NT	Warren Snowdon	ALP	5.5
Werriwa	NSW	Anne Stanley	ALP	5.5
Jagajaga	Vic	Kate Thwaites	ALP	5.9
Fairly safe
Macnamara	Vic	Josh Burns	ALP	6.1
Isaacs	Vic	Mark Dreyfus	ALP	6.4
Oxley	Qld	Milton Dick	ALP	6.4
Rankin	Qld	Jim Chalmers	ALP	6.4
Hindmarsh	SA	Mark Butler	ALP	6.5
McMahon	NSW	Chris Bowen	ALP	6.6
Brand	WA	Madeleine King	ALP	6.7
Fremantle	WA	Josh Wilson	ALP	6.9
Bruce	Vic	Julian Hill	ALP	7.3
Bean	ACT	David Smith	ALP	7.5
Adelaide	SA	Steve Georganas	ALP	8.2
Wills	Vic	Peter Khalil	ALP vs. GRN	8.2
Macarthur	NSW	Mike Freelander	ALP	8.4
Kingsford Smith	NSW	Matt Thistlethwaite	ALP	8.8
Holt	Vic	Anthony Byrne	ALP	8.9
Bendigo	Vic	Lisa Chesters	ALP	8.9
Barton	NSW	Linda Burney	ALP	9.4
Makin	SA	Tony Zappia	ALP	9.7
Safe
Hawke	Vic	new seat	ALP	10.2
Ballarat	Vic	Catherine King	ALP	10.3
Maribyrnong	Vic	Bill Shorten	ALP	10.3
Corio	Vic	Richard Marles	ALP	10.3
Fenner	ACT	Andrew Leigh	ALP	10.6
Whitlam	NSW	Stephen Jones	ALP	10.9
Hotham	Vic	Clare O'Neil	ALP	11.2
Kingston	SA	Amanda Rishworth	ALP	11.9
Franklin	Tas	Julie Collins	ALP	12.2
Chifley	NSW	Ed Husic	ALP	12.4
Lalor	Vic	Joanne Ryan	ALP	12.4
Gellibrand	Vic	Tim Watts	ALP	13.0
Cunningham	NSW	Sharon Bird	ALP	13.4
Watson	NSW	Tony Burke	ALP	13.5
Newcastle	NSW	Sharon Claydon	ALP	13.8
Fowler	NSW	Chris Hayes	ALP	14.0
Spence	SA	Nick Champion	ALP	14.1
Gorton	Vic	Brendan O'Connor	ALP	14.3
Cooper	Vic	Ged Kearney	ALP vs. GRN	14.6
Blaxland	NSW	Jason Clare	ALP	14.7
Grayndler	NSW	Anthony Albanese	ALP vs. GRN	16.3
Canberra	ACT	Alicia Payne	ALP	17.1
Fraser	Vic	Daniel Mulino	ALP	18.1
Sydney	NSW	Tanya Plibersek	ALP	18.7
Calwell	Vic	Maria Vamvakinou	ALP	19.6
Scullin	Vic	Andrew Giles	ALP	21.7
Crossbench seats (6)
Indi	Vic	Helen Haines	IND vs. LIB	1.4
Mayo	SA	Rebekha Sharkie	CA vs. LIB	5.1
Warringah	NSW	Zali Steggall	IND vs. LIB	7.2
Kennedy	Qld	Bob Katter	KAP vs. LNP	13.3
Melbourne	Vic	Adam Bandt	GRN vs. LIB	21.8
Clark	Tas	Andrew Wilkie	IND vs. ALP	22.1
