= Standing Committee on Employment, Education and Training =

Standing committee of the Australian House of Representatives

- 47th Parliament of Australia

Type
- Type: Standing Committee of the Australian House of Representatives

History
- Founded: 2013
- Preceded by: Standing Committee on Education and Employment

Leadership
- Chair: Lisa Chesters, Labor
- Deputy Chair: Terry Young, Liberal National

Structure
- Seats: 9
- Political groups: Government (5): Labor (5); Opposition (3): Liberal (2); Liberal National (1); Crossbench (1): Independent (1)

Meeting place
- Parliament House; Canberra, Australian Capital Territory; Australia

Website
- Standing Committee on Employment, Education and Training

Rules
- Standing Orders of the House of Representatives

The Standing Committee on Employment, Education and Training is a committee of the Australian House of Representatives. The committee is a "General Purpose Standing Committee" governed by Standing Order 215. It consists of nine members, five government members and four non-government members (three members of the official opposition and one member of the crossbench). The chair is appointed by the Prime Minister and the deputy chair by the Leader of the Opposition under Standing Order 232.

== History ==
General Purpose Standing Committees of the House of Representatives were first established in 1987, The committee has been regularly renamed since; some recent names include:

Committees		Parliament(s)
Employment, Education and Training		35th-38th
Employment, Education and Workplace Relations		39t
Employment and Workplace Relations	Education and Training	40th
Employment, Workplace Relations and Workforce Participation	Education and Vocational Training	41st
Employment, Workplace Relations and Workforce Participation	Education and Training	42nd
Education and Employment		43rd-44th
Employment, Education and Training		45th-47th

== Membership ==
=== 47th Parliament ===
In the 47th parliament (July 2022 – present), the membership of the committee is the following:

Member	Party	Electorate
Lisa Chesters Chair	Labor	Division of Bendigo, Victoria
Terry Young Deputy Chair	Liberal Nationals	Division of Longman, Queensland
Zoe Daniel	Independent	Division of Goldstein, Victoria
Cassandra Fernando	Labor	Division of Holt, Victoria
Carina Garland	Labor	Division of Chisholm, Victoria
Zoe McKenzie	Liberal	Division of Flinders, Victoria
Gavin Pearce	Liberal	Division of Braddon, Tasmania
Joanne Ryan	Labor	Division of Lalor, Victoria
Sally Sitou	Labor	Division of Reid, New South Wales
Anne Stanley	Labor	Division of Werriwa, New South Wales

== List of Chairs ==
Member	Party	Electorate	Parliament(s)	Years
Tony Zappia	Labor	Division of Paterson, New South Wales	47th	2022–present

== See also ==
- Australian House of Representatives committees
