= Standing Committee on Procedure =

Standing committee of the Australian House of Representatives

- 47th Parliament of Australia

Type
- Type: Standing Committee of the Australian House of Representatives

Leadership
- Chair: Shayne Neumann, Labor since 2 August 2022
- Deputy Chair: Ross Vasta, Liberal National since 2 August 2022

Structure
- Seats: 7
- Political groups: Government (4): Labor (4); Opposition (3): Liberal National (3)

Meeting place
- Parliament House; Canberra, Australian Capital Territory; Australia

Website
- Standing Committee on Procedure

Rules
- Standing Orders of the House of Representatives

The Standing Committee on Procedure is a committee of the Australian House of Representatives responsible for the practices and procedures of the House of Representatives and its committees. The committee is governed by Standing Order 221 and consists of seven members, four government members and three non-government members. The chair is appointed by the Prime Minister and the deputy chair by the Leader of the Opposition under Standing Order 232.

== History ==
The Standing Committee on Procedure was established in 1985, replacing the former Standing Committee on Standing Orders.

== Membership ==
=== 47th Parliament ===
In the 47th parliament (July 2022 – present), the membership of the committee is the following:

Member	Party	Electorate
Shayne Neumann (chair)	Labor	Division of Blair, Queensland
Ross Vasta (deputy chair)	Liberal National	Division of Bonner, Queensland
Michelle Ananda-Rajah	Labor	Division of Higgins, Victoria
Colin Boyce	Liberal National	Division of Flynn, Queensland
Carina Garland	Labor	Division of Chisholm, Victoria
Anne Stanley	Labor	Division of Werriwa, New South Wales
Terry Young	Liberal National	Division of Longman, Queensland

=== 46th Parliament ===
In the 46th parliament (July 2019 – April 2022), the membership of the committee was as follows:

Member	Party	Electorate
Ross Vasta (chair until 17 September 2019 and from 12 February 2020) Bert van Manen (chair from 17 September 2019 until 9 January 2020)	Liberal National	Division of Bonner, Queensland Division of Forde, Queensland
Milton Dick (deputy chair)	Labor	Division of Oxley, Queensland
Ian Goodenough	Liberal	Division of Moore, Western Australia
Patrick Gorman	Labor	Division of Perth, Western Australia
Gladys Liu	Liberal	Division of Chisholm, Victoria
Joanne Ryan	Labor	Division of Lalor, Victoria
Julian Simmonds	Liberal National	Division of Ryan, Queensland

=== 45th Parliament ===
In the 45th parliament (September 2016 – July 2019), the membership of the committee was as follows:

- Andrew Gee
- Ian Goodenough
- Steve Irons
- Tony Pasin
- Terri Butler until 10 September 2018
- Joanne Ryan
- Milton Dick
- Jane Prentice from 10 September 2018
- Patrick Gorman from 10 September 2018

=== 44th Parliament ===
In the 44th parliament (November 2013 – September 2016), the membership of the committee was as follows:

- Mr Broadbent
- Mr Buchholz
- Mr Danby
- Mr Goodenough
- Ms Hall
- Mr Hayes until 23 October 2014
- Mr Randall
- Ms Ryan from 23 October 2014
- Mr Wyatt from 7 September 2015, until 12 October 2016
- Dr Southcott from 13 October 2016

== See also ==
- Australian House of Representatives committees
- United States House Committee on Rules
- House of Commons Procedure Committee
