= Standing Committee on Communications, Sport and the Arts =

Standing committee of the Australian House of Representatives

- 47th Parliament of Australia

Type
- Type: Standing Committee of the Australian House of Representatives

History
- Founded: 13 September 2016
- Preceded by: Climate Change, Environment and the Arts

Leadership
- Chair: Susan Templeman, Labor
- Deputy Chair: Mary Aldred, Liberal

Structure
- Seats: 10
- Political groups: Government (6): Labor (6); Opposition (3): Liberal (2); Nationals (1); Crossbench (1): Independent (1)

Meeting place
- Parliament House; Canberra, Australian Capital Territory; Australia

Website
- Standing Committee on Communications and the Arts

Rules
- Standing Orders of the House of Representatives

The Standing Committee on Communications and the Arts is a committee of the Australian House of Representatives. The committee is a "General Purpose Standing Committee" governed by Standing Order 215. It consists of nine members, five government members and four non-government members (three members of the official opposition and one member of the crossbench). The chair is appointed by the Prime Minister and the deputy chair by the Leader of the Opposition under Standing Order 232.

== History ==
General Purpose Standing Committees of the House of Representatives were first established in 1987, The committee has been regularly renamed; some recent names include:

Committees		Parliament(s)
Environment, Recreation and the Arts		35th-38th
Communications, Transport and the Arts		39th
Communications, Information Technology and the Arts		40th
Communications, Information Technology and the Arts		41st
Climate Change, Water, Environment and the Arts		42nd
Climate Change, Environment and the Arts		43rd
Communications and the Arts	Health and Ageing	44th
Communications and the Arts	Health, Aged Care and Sport	45th
Communications and the Arts	Health, Aged Care and Sport	46th
Communications and the Arts	Health, Aged Care and Sport	47th
Communications, Sport and the Arts		48th

== Membership ==
=== 47th Parliament ===
In the 47th parliament (July 2022 – March 2025), the membership of the committee was the following:

Member	Party	Electorate
Brian Mitchell Chair	Labor	Division of Lyons, Tasmania
Bridget Archer Deputy Chair	Liberal	Division of Bass, Tasmania
Libby Coker	Labor	Division of Corangamite, Victoria
Mark Coulton	Nationals	Division of Parkes, New South Wales
Zoe Daniel	Independent	Division of Goldstein, Victoria
Peter Khalil	Labor	Division of Wills, Victoria
Zoe McKenzie	Liberal	Division of Flinders, Victoria
Gordon Reid	Labor	Division of Robertson, New South Wales
Susan Templeman	Labor	Division of Macquarie, New South Wales

=== 48th Parliament ===
In the 48th parliament (July 2025 – present), the membership of the committee is the following:

Member	Party	Electorate
Susan Templeman Chair	Labor	Division of Macquarie, New South Wales
Mary Aldred Deputy Chair	Liberal	Division of Monash, Victoria
Mary Doyle	Labor	Division of Aston, Victoria
Justine Elliot	Labor	Division of Richmond, New South Wales
David Moncrieff	Labor	Division of Hughes, New South Wales
Alison Penfold	Nationals	Division of Lyne, New South Wales
Joanne Ryan	Labor	Division of Lalor, Victoria
Zali Steggall	Independent	Division of Warringah, New South Wales
Matt Smith	Labor	Division of Leichhardt, Queensland
Tom Venning	Liberal	Division of Grey, South Australia

== List of Chairs ==
Member	Party	Electorate	Parliament(s)
Luke Howarth	Liberal National	Division of Petrie, Queensland	45th
David Gillespie	Nationals	Division of Lyne, New South Wales	46th (until 2 July 2021)
Anne Webster	Nationals	Division of Mallee, Victoria	46th (from 25 August 2021)
Brian Mitchell	Labor	Division of Lyons, Tasmania	47th
Susan Templeman	Labor	Division of Macquarie, New South Wales	48th

== See also ==
- Australian House of Representatives committees
