= Standing Committee on Petitions =

Standing committee of the Australian House of Representatives

- 47th Parliament of Australia

Type
- Type: Standing Committee of the Australian House of Representatives

Leadership
- Chair: Jodie Belyea, Labor
- Deputy Chair: Leon Rebello, Liberal

Structure
- Seats: 8
- Political groups: Government (5): Labor (5); Opposition (3): Liberal (2) (Note: 2 Liberal National Party of Queensland (LNP) MPs who sit in the Liberal party room); Crossbench (1): Nationals (1) (Note: Liberal National Party of Queensland (LNP) MP who sits in the Nationals party room)

Meeting place
- Parliament House; Canberra, Australian Capital Territory; Australia

Website
- Standing Committee on Petitions

Rules
- Standing Orders of the House of Representatives

The Standing Committee on Petitions is a committee of the Australian House of Representatives responsible for the processing of petitions addressed to the House of Representatives. The committee is governed by Standing Order 220 and consists of eight members, five government members and three non-government members. The chair is appointed by the Prime Minister and the deputy chair by the Leader of the Opposition under Standing Order 232.

== History ==
The Procedure Committee undertook a study tour of other parliaments in 2006, resulting in a report which, among other things noted the potential value in the establishment of a Petitions Committee modelled on the Public Petitions Committee of the Scottish Parliament. This was followed by a further report of the Procedure Committee in September 2007 formally recommending the creation of a Petitions Committee. in 2008 the Rudd Government amended standing orders establishing a Standing Committee on Petitions for the first time.

== Membership ==
=== 48th Parliament ===
In the 48th parliament (July 2025 – present), the membership of the committee is as follows:

Member	Party	Electorate
Jodie Belyea (chair)	Labor	Division of Dunkley, Victoria
Leon Rebello (deputy chair)	Liberal National	Division of McPherson, Queensland
Cameron Caldwell	Liberal National	Division of Fadden, Queensland
Emma Comer	Labor	Division of Petrie, Queensland
Trish Cook	Labor	Division of Bullwinkel, Western Australia
Rowan Holzberger	Labor	Division of Forde, Queensland
Llew O'Brien	Liberal National	Division of Wide Bay, Queensland
Tracey Roberts	Labor	Division of Pearce, Western Australia

=== 47th Parliament ===
In the 47th parliament (July 2022 – March 2025), the membership of the committee was as follows:

Member	Party	Electorate
Susan Templeman Chair	Labor	Division of Macquarie, Queensland
Ross Vasta Deputy Chair	Liberal National	Division of Bonner, Queensland
Sam Birrell	Nationals	Division of Nicholls, Victoria
Alison Byrnes	Labor	Division of Cunningham, New South Wales
Lisa Chesters	Labor	Division of Bendigo, Victoria
Garth Hamilton	Liberal National	Division of Groom, Queensland
Tracey Roberts	Labor	Division of Pearce, Western Australia
Meryl Swanson	Labor	Division of Paterson, New South Wales

=== 46th Parliament ===
In the 46th parliament (July 2019 – April 2022), the membership of the committee was as follows:

Member	Party	Electorate
Llew O'Brien Chair	Liberal National	Division of Wide Bay, Queensland

== List of Inquiries ==
Parliament	Reference date	Report title	Tabled date
42nd	4 June 2008	Electronic petitioning to the House of Representatives	16 November 2009
42nd	12 February 2008	The work of the first Petitions Committee: 2008-2010	21 June 2010
43rd	25 October 2010	The work of the Petitions Committee: 2010-2013 - An established part of the democratic process	24 June 2013
44th	4 December 2013	The work of the Petitions Committee: 2013-2016	5 May 2016
45th	24 May 2017	Making voices heard: Inquiry into the e-petitioning system of the House of Representatives Petitions Committee	29 May 2018
45th	15 August 2018	Your voice can change our future: Inquiry into the future of petitioning in the House	21 February 2019
46th	9 December 2020	Report on the inquiry into aspects of petitioning security and accessibility	24 June 2021
47th	No inquiries held		
48th	4 November 2025	Inquiry into the Standing Orders relating to petitions	TBC

== List of Chairs ==
No.	Parliament	Chair	Term	Deputy
1	42nd	Julia Irwin	12 February 2008 – 19 July 2010	Russell Broadbent
2	43rd	John Murphy	25 October 2010 – 5 August 2013	Dennis Jensen
3	44th	Dennis Jensen	4 December 2013 – 9 May 2016	Justine Elliot
4	45th	Ross Vasta	14 September 2016 – 21 June 2017	Justine Elliot
5	45th	Lucy Wicks	21 June 2017 – 11 April 2019	Justine Elliot
6	46th	Llew O'Brien	24 July 2019 – 24 February 2020	Justine Elliot
7	46th	Ken O'Dowd	6 March 2020 – 11 April 2022	Justine Elliot
8	47th	Susan Templeman	26 July 2022 – 28 March 2025	Ross Vasta
9	48th	Jodie Belyea	30 July 2026 – Incumbent	Leon Rebello

== See also ==
- Australian House of Representatives committees
- House of Commons Petitions Committee
