= Standing Committee of Privileges and Members' Interests =

Standing committee of the Australian House of Representatives

- 47th Parliament of Australia

Type
- Type: Standing Committee of the Australian House of Representatives

Leadership
- Chair: Rob Mitchell, Labor since 2 August 2022
- Deputy Chair: James Stevens, Liberal since 2 August 2022

Structure
- Seats: 13
- Political groups: Government (7): Labor (7); Opposition (5): Liberal (2); Liberal National (2); National (1); Crossbench (1): Independent (1)

Meeting place
- Parliament House; Canberra, Australian Capital Territory; Australia

Website
- Standing Committee of Privileges and Member

Rules
- Standing Orders of the House of Representatives

The Standing Committee of Privileges and Members' Interests is a committee of the Australian House of Representatives responsible for the consideration of documents presented to the House of Representatives. The committee is governed by Standing Order 216 and consists of thirteen members, one member nominated by the Leader of the House, another member nominated by the Deputy Leader of the Opposition and eleven other members (six government, four opposition and one crossbench). The chair is appointed by the Prime Minister and the deputy chair by the Leader of the Opposition under Standing Order 232.

== Membership ==
=== 47th Parliament ===
In the 47th parliament (July 2022 – present), the membership of the committee is the following:

Member	Party	Electorate
Rob Mitchell (chair)	Labor	Division of McEwen, Victoria
James Stevens (deputy chair)	Liberal	Division of Sturt, South Australia
Anne Stanley (nominee of the Leader of the House)	Labor	Division of Werriwa, New South Wales
Alex Hawke (nominee of the Deputy Opposition Leader)	Liberal	Division of Mitchell, New South Wales
Scott Buchholz	Liberal National	Division of Wright, Queensland
Cameron Caldwell	Liberal National	Division of Fadden, Queensland
Darren Chester MP	Nationals	Division of Gippsland, Victoria
Sharon Claydon	Labor	Division of Newcastle, New South Wales
Daniel Mulino	Labor	Division of Fraser, Victoria
Alicia Payne	Labor	Division of Canberra, Australian Capital Territory
Joanne Ryan	Labor	Division of Lalor, Victoria
Kate Thwaites	Labor	Division of Jagajaga, Victoria
Andrew Wilkie	Independent	Division of Clark, Tasmania

== See also ==
- Australian House of Representatives committees
