= Standing Committee on Appropriations and Administration =

Standing committee of the Australian House of Representatives

- 48th Parliament of Australia

Type
- Type: Standing Committee of the Australian House of Representatives

Leadership
- Speaker (Chair): Milton Dick, Labor since 26 July 2022
- Deputy Chair: Tony Pasin, Liberal

Structure
- Seats: 9
- Political groups: Government (5): Labor (5); Opposition (3): Liberal (3); Crossbench (1): Nationals (1)

Meeting place
- Parliament House; Canberra, Australian Capital Territory; Australia

Website
- Standing Committee on Appropriations and Administration

Rules
- Standing Orders of the House of Representatives

The Standing Committee on Appropriations and Administration is a committee of the Australian House of Representatives responsible for the funding and operations of the House of Representatives. The committee is governed by Standing Order 222A and consists of nine members, the Speaker as chair, ex officio, four government members and four non-government members (from the opposition or the crossbench). The deputy chair is appointed by the Leader of the Opposition under Standing Order 232.

== Membership ==
=== 48th Parliament ===
In the 48th parliament (July 2025 – present), the membership of the committee is as follows:

Member	Party	Electorate
Milton Dick (Speaker and chair)	Labor	Division of Oxley, Queensland
Tony Pasin (deputy chair)	Liberal	Division of Barker, South Australia
Mary Aldred	Liberal	Division of Monash, Victoria
Josh Burns	Labor	Division of Macnamara, Victoria
Claire Clutterham	Labor	Division of Sturt, South Australia
Libby Coker	Labor	Division of Corangamite, Victoria
Alison Penfold	Nationals	Division of Lyne, New South Wales
Zhi Soon	Labor	Division of Banks, New South Wales
Rick Wilson	Liberal	Division of O'Connor, Western Australia

=== 47th Parliament ===
In the 47th parliament (July 2022 – April 2025), the membership of the committee was as follows:

Member	Party	Electorate
Milton Dick (Speaker and chair)	Labor	Division of Oxley, Queensland
Mark Coulton (deputy chair)	Liberal National	Division of Parkes, New South Wales
Sharon Claydon	Labor	Division of Newcastle, New South Wales
Steve Georganas	Labor	Division of Adelaide, South Australia
Helen Haines	Independent	Division of Indi, Victoria
Julian Leeser	Liberal	Division of Berowra, New South Wales
Sally Sitou	Labor	Division of Reid, New South Wales
Anne Stanley	Labor	Division of Werriwa, New South Wales
Bert van Manen	Liberal National	Division of Forde, Queensland

== See also ==
- Australian House of Representatives committees
- United States House Committee on Appropriations
