= Australian House of Representatives committees =

Parliamentary committees of the Australian House of Representatives are groups of Members of Parliament, appointed by the House of Representatives, to undertake certain specified tasks. They comprise government and non-government Members and have considerable powers to undertake work on behalf of the Parliament.

== Federation Chamber ==
The Federation Chamber, established in 1994 as the Main Committee and renamed in February 2012, functions as a secondary debating venue within the Australian House of Representatives, allowing for parallel proceedings alongside the main Chamber to enhance parliamentary efficiency. This arrangement originated from recommendations in the 1993 Procedure Committee report About Time, which proposed creating a parallel stream for debating legislation and other matters to alleviate time pressures in the House. The renaming to Federation Chamber addressed potential confusion with the physical main committee room in parliament house which is used for joint and standing committees and served to emphasise parliament's role in Australia's federal system.

=== Purpose and role ===
The primary purpose of the Federation Chamber is to provide an additional forum for debating a restricted range of business, thereby optimising the use of parliamentary time, increasing opportunities for Members to speak on bills and reports, and facilitating more intimate and interactive discussions due to its smaller scale. It handles non-contentious matters that do not require formal divisions or votes, focusing on enhancing scrutiny of government legislation, private Members' business, and committee-related activities

== Standing committees ==
Under the Standing Orders of the House, standing committees are appointed for the life of the Parliament and they are usually re-established in some form in successive Parliaments (that is, after each election).

The House has two types of standing committees:

- general purpose committees – established to inquire into and report upon any matters referred to them, including legislation. These committees specialise by subject area, between them covering most areas of policy and government administration.
- domestic or internal committees – concerned with the powers and procedures of the House or the administration of Parliament.

== Select committees ==
Select committees are appointed as the need arises for a specific purpose, and have a limited life.

One notable example was the 1963 House of Representatives Select Committee on Grievances of the Yirrkala Aborigines, Arnhem Land Reserve, which was created to address the concerns of the Yolngu people living on Yirrkala mission, after mining leases had been granted to several areas of the Gove Peninsula in Arnhem Land without consulting the people who had lived there for thousands of years. The committee was established as a result of the Yirrkala bark petitions being presented to Parliament in August 1963. This committee comprised Roger Dean (Chairman); Charles Barnes; Kim Beazley Sr.; Gordon Bryant; Don Chipp; Bert Kelly; and Jock Nelson.

== Joint committees ==
Joint committees are established by both Houses of the Australian parliament and include both Members and Senators. An example of this is the Joint Standing Committee on Northern Australia, appointed by resolution by the House of Representatives on 4 July 2019 and the Senate on 22 July 2019. The Inquiry into the destruction of 46,000-year-old caves at the Juukan Gorge in the Pilbara region of Western Australia was referred to this Committee in June 2020.

== Pay and benefits ==
Members receive no additional pay for their service as ordinary members on committees. Committee Chairs and Deputy Chairs receive additional pay depending on the committee on which they serve, which is specified as a percentage of the base pay of an MP and Senator ($239,270 as of July 2025). Additional pay for committee chairs is up to 16% of the base pay ($38,283.20), depending on the committee. Deputy Chairs receive up to an additional 8% ($19,141.60).

== List of House and Joint committees ==
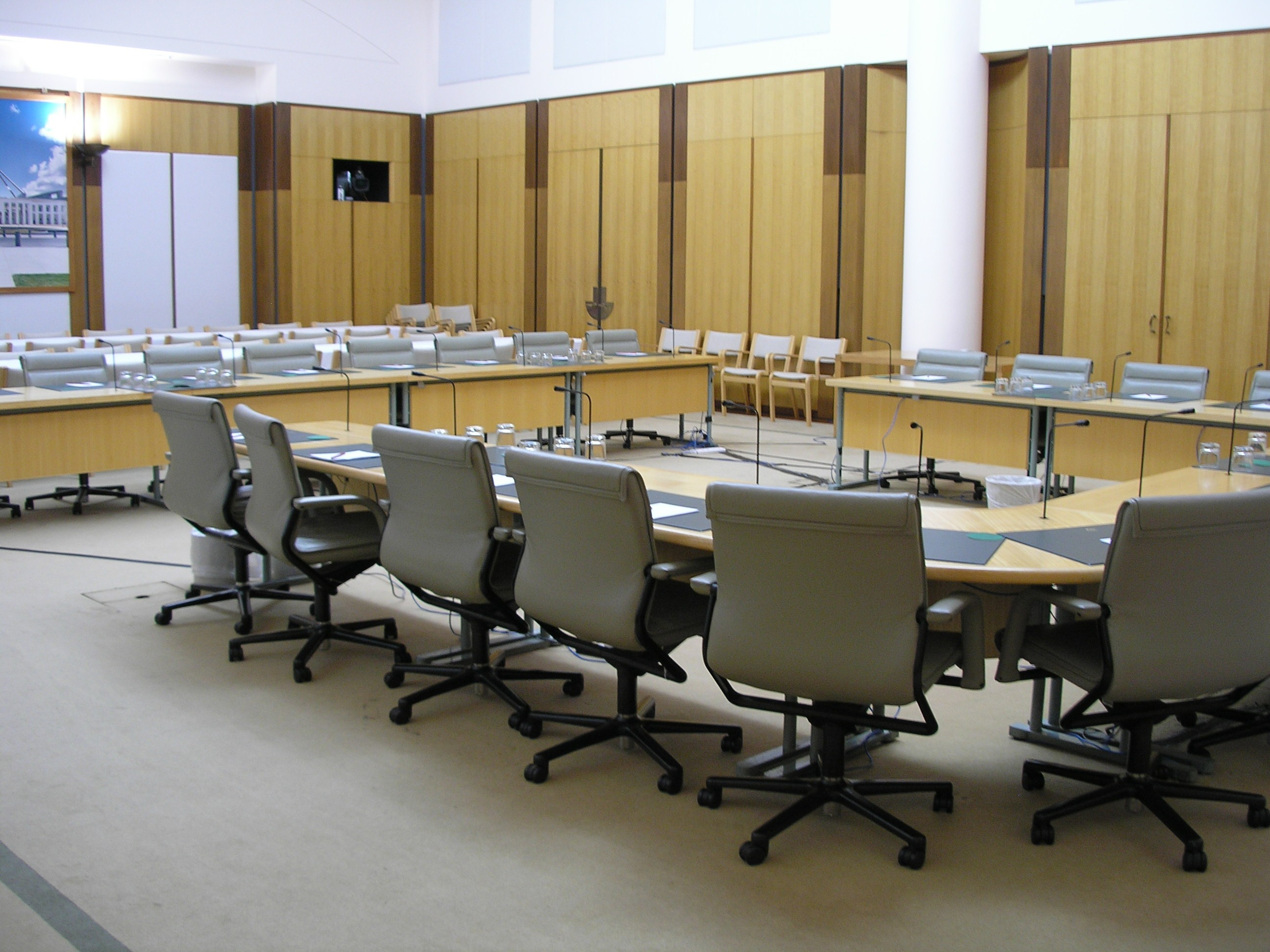
House of Representatives committee room, Parliament House, Canberra

A short video on Australian Parliamentary Committees

Committee	Chair	Deputy Chair
Federation Chamber (Note: "The Federation Chamber was established in 1994 with the title ‘Main Committee’. Despite the change of name in 2012 it is still technically a committee of the House." - House of Representatives Practice, 7th Edn)	Sharon Claydon	Terry Young
House General Purpose Standing Committees
Agriculture	Meryl Swanson	Rick Wilson
Climate Change, Energy, Environment and Water	Anne Urquhart	Zali Steggall
Communications and the Arts	Brian Mitchell	Bridget Archer
Economics	Daniel Mulino	Garth Hamilton
Employment, Education and Training	Lisa Chesters	Terry Young
Health, Aged Care and Sport	Mike Freelander	Melissa McIntosh
Industry, Innovation and Science	Rob Mitchell	Michelle Landry
Regional Development, Infrastructure and Transport	Luke Gosling	Tony Pasin
Social Policy and Legal Affairs	Susan Templeman	Pat Conaghan
House Domestic Committees
Appropriations and Administration	Milton Dick	Tony Pasin
Petitions	Jodie Belyea	Leon Rebello
Privileges and Members' Interests	Justine Elliot	Henry Pike
Procedure	Sharon Claydon	Ben Small
Publications	Mary Doyle	Henry Pike
Selection	Milton Dick	Sharon Claydon
House Select Committees
None currently appointed
Joint Statutory Committees
Broadcasting of Parliamentary Proceedings	Milton Dick MP	Senator Sue Lines
Corporations and Financial Services	Senator Deborah O'Neill	Alex Hawke MP
Intelligence and Security	Peter Khalil MP	Andrew Wallace MP
Law Enforcement	Senator Helen Polley	Llew O'Brien MP
Human Rights	Josh Burns MP	Henry Pike MP
Public Accounts and Audit	Linda Burney MP	Senator Linda Reynolds
Public Works	Graham Perrett MP	Keith Pitt MP
Joint Standing Committees
Aboriginal and Torres Strait Islander Affairs	Senator Jana Stewart	Melissa Price MP
Electoral Matters	Kate Thwaites MP	Senator James McGrath
Foreign Affairs, Defence and Trade	Shayne Neumann MP	Senator David Fawcett
Implementation of the National Redress Scheme	Senator Catryna Bilyk	Senator Dean Smith
Migration	Maria Vamvakinou MP	Anne Webster MP
National Anti-Corruption Commission	Senator Karen Grogan	Helen Haines MP
National Capital and External Territories	Alicia Payne MP	Nola Marino MP
National Disability Insurance Scheme	Libby Coker MP	Senator Hollie Hughes
Northern Australia	Marion Scrymgour MP	Warren Entsch MP
Parliamentary Library	Anne Stanley MP (Joint Chair)	
Parliamentary Library	Senator Slade Brockman (Joint Chair)	
Publications	Fiona Phillips MP	Senator Fatima Payman
Trade and Investment Growth	Steve Georganas MP	Scott Buchholz MP
Treaties	Josh Wilson MP	Phillip Thompson MP

== List of former committees ==
Committee	Chair	Deputy Chair	Established	Dissolved
House Domestic Committees
Library Committee	Various			13 September 2016 (Note: replaced by the Joint Standing Committee on the Parliamentary Library)
House Committee	Various			19 September 2019 (Note: replaced by the Appropriations and Administration Committee)
House Select Committees
Televising of the House of Representatives	Leo McLeay	David Jull		22 August 1991
Print Media	Michael Lee	Warwick Smith	22 August 1991	25 March 1992
Recent Australian Bushfires	Gary Nairn	Dick Adams	26 March 2003	15 September 2005
Regional Development and Decentralisation	John McVeigh (1 June – 20 December 2017)	Meryl Swanson	1 June 2017	28 June 2018
Regional Development and Decentralisation	Darren Chester (8 February – 5 March 2018)	Meryl Swanson	1 June 2017	28 June 2018
Regional Development and Decentralisation	Damien Drum (from 28 March 2018)	Meryl Swanson	1 June 2017	28 June 2018
Intergenerational Welfare Dependence	Russell Broadbent	Pat Conroy (30 May – 10 September 2018)	24 May 2018	2 April 2019
Intergenerational Welfare Dependence	Russell Broadbent	Ged Kearney (from 12 September 2018)	24 May 2018	2 April 2019
Regional Australia	Tony Pasin	Meryl Swanson (from 29 July 2019 - 7 December 2020)	25 July 2019	31 March 2022
Regional Australia	Tony Pasin	Joel Fitzgibbon (from 7 December 2020)	25 July 2019	31 March 2022
Social Media and Online Safety	Lucy Wicks	Tim Watts	1 December 2021	15 March 2022
Mental Health and Suicide Prevention	Fiona Martin	Emma McBride	2 August 2022	30 November 2023
Workforce Australia Employment Services	Julian Hill	Russell Broadbent	10 December 2020	24 November 2021
Nuclear Energy	Dan Repacholi	Ted O'Brien	10 October 2024	28 March 2025
Joint Select Committees
Intelligence Services
Republic Referendum
Parliamentary Budget Office
Government Procurement
Trade and Investment Growth	Ken O'Dowd MP	Jim Chalmers MP	4 September 2014	9 May 2016
Trade and Investment Growth	Ken O'Dowd MP	Pat Conroy MP	4 September 2014	9 May 2016
Australia's Family Law System	Kevin Andrews MP	Senator Pauline Hanson	18 September 2019	22 November 2021
Road Safety	Llew O'Brien MP	Senator Alex Gallacher	1 August 2019	30 October 2020
Road Safety	Pat Conaghan MP	Matt Thistlethwaite MP	1 August 2019	30 October 2020
Road Safety	Pat Conaghan MP	Matt Thistlethwaite MP	25 February 2021	25 March 2022
Road Safety	Darren Chester MP	Matt Thistlethwaite MP	25 February 2021	25 March 2022
Implementation of the National Redress Scheme (Note: In the 45th Parliament the Committee was named: Oversight of the implementation of redress related recommendations of the Royal Commission into Institutional Responses to Child Sexual Abuse")	Senator Derryn Hinch	Sharon Claydon MP	20 June 2017	2 April 2019
Implementation of the National Redress Scheme	Senator Dean Smith	Sharon Claydon MP	10 September 2019	11 April 2022
National Anti-Corruption Commission Legislation	Senator Linda White	Helen Haines MP	28 September 2022	10 November 2022
Parliamentary Standards			10 February 2022	11 April 2022 (Note: Committee was re-established in the next Parliament)
Parliamentary Standards	Sharon Claydon MP	Senator Marise Payne	26 July 2022	22 November 2022 (Note: replaced by the Joint Standing Committee on Parliamentary Standards)
Aboriginal and Torres Strait Islander Voice Referendum (Note: in the 44th Parliament the Committee was called: Constitutional Recognition of Aboriginal and Torres Strait Islander Peoples) (Note: in the 45th Parliament the Committee was called: Constitutional Recognition Relating to Aboriginal and Torres Strait Islander Peoples 2018)	Senator Trish Crossin	Senator George Brandis	28 November 2012	30 January 2013
Aboriginal and Torres Strait Islander Voice Referendum	Ken Wyatt MP	Senator Nova Peris	2 December 2013	25 June 2015
Aboriginal and Torres Strait Islander Voice Referendum	Senator Pat Dodson & Julian Leeser MP	no deputy chair	1 March 2018	29 November 2018.
Aboriginal and Torres Strait Islander Voice Referendum	Senator Nita Green	Keith Wolahan MP	30 March 2023	12 May 2023
Social Media and Australian Society	Sharon Claydon MP	Senator Sarah Hanson-Young	15 May 2024	18 November 2024
Northern Australia	Marion Scrymgour MP	Warren Entsch MP	3 August 2022	28 March 2025 (Note: Replaced by the Joint Standing Committee on Northern Australia)

== See also ==
- Australian Senate committees
- Ministerial Committee
