= Select Committee on Nuclear Energy =

Select committee of the Australian House of Representatives

- 47th Parliament of Australia

Type
- Type: Select Committee of the Australian House of Representatives

History
- Founded: 10 October 2024
- Disbanded: 28 March 2025

Leadership
- Chair: Dan Repacholi, Labor
- Deputy Chair: Ted O'Brien, Liberal National

Structure
- Seats: Voting (7); Supplementary (2)
- Political groups: Voting (7) Government (4): Labor (4); Opposition (2): Liberal National (1); National (1); Crossbench (1): Independent (1); Supplementary (2) Government (1): Labor (1); Opposition (1): Liberal (1)

Meeting place
- Parliament House; Canberra, Australian Capital Territory; Australia

Website
- Select Committee on Nuclear Energy

Rules
- Standing Orders of the House of Representatives

The Select Committee on Nuclear Energy was a select committee of the Australian House of Representatives of the 47th Parliament of Australia responsible for inquiring into nuclear power generation in Australia, including the proposed deployment of small modular nuclear reactors proposed by the Opposition.

== History ==
On 10 October 2024, following the announcement by the Opposition of plans to build nuclear power plants were they to be elected at the 2025 Australian federal election, the House of Representatives resolved to form a select committee to inquire into nuclear power, and the particular proposals of the opposition. Following its establishment the committee conducted public hearings in various locations around Australia, including in 5 different states and in regional locations. Over 829 submissions were received from interested organisations and members of the public.

=== Interim Report ===
The committee released its Interim Report in February 2025, concluding that nuclear power generation could not be deployed in time to meet Australia's energy transition targets or climate commitments, with construction timelines for even a single reactor estimated at 15–25 years, potentially delaying availability until the 2040s or later. The report highlighted that nuclear power is the most expensive energy option, with recent international projects costing A$27–45 billion per reactor—far exceeding Coalition estimates—and posing significant risks to taxpayers amid a cost-of-living crisis, while small modular reactors remain non-commercial and unviable compared to renewables like solar and wind. It also noted roadblocks including regulatory development, workforce shortages, lack of social license, and water supply impacts, projecting that renewables would comprise 84% of the national grid by 2030 and 96% by 2035.

Coalition members issued a coordinate dissenting report, arguing that nuclear power would lower energy costs and power bills, and asserting that achieving net zero emissions by 2050 would be impossible without nuclear. They assumed a capital cost of A$10,000 per kilowatt—disputed as unrealistically low compared to international examples costing 2.5 times more—and criticized the majority for overlooking nuclear's role in providing baseload power complementary to renewables, while advocating for lifting the federal nuclear ban to support jobs and the energy mix.

=== Reception and impact ===
The interim report released in February 2025 elicited varied responses from stakeholders. Environmental groups welcomed the findings, with Friends of the Earth Australia praising the committee's conclusion that nuclear power is "too expensive and too slow," emphasizing risks to taxpayers and the superiority of renewables. The Conservation Council of Western Australia echoed this, stating nuclear is "too risky, too slow" to meet energy needs. The Climate Council described the Coalition's nuclear scheme as "high risk, zero reward," aligning with expert warnings on viability. Media analyses, such as in The Conversation, critiqued the report for skewering the Coalition's plan, reigniting energy debates. Government figures, including Committee Chair Dan Repacholi MP, highlighted delays into the 2040s and high costs compared to renewables. Coalition members, in their dissenting report, continued to assert nuclear's role in lowering costs and achieving net zero by 2050.

The report influenced broader policy discussions, with the Climate Change Authority modeling showing the Coalition's nuclear pivot could add 2 billion tonnes of emissions by 2050, missing 2030 targets. It also prompted critiques of economic impacts, with analyses estimating Coalition nuclear policies could cost the economy at least A$4.3 trillion by 2050 due to delays and crowding out renewables.

=== Post-dissolution developments ===
Following the dissolution of the House of Representatives on 28 March 2025, the committee lapsed without issuing a final report, and no successor was appointed in the 48th Parliament. The nuclear ban under federal law remained in place. In the lead-up to and following the 2025 federal election, the Coalition continued advocating for nuclear energy, proposing up to 14 GW across seven sites and introducing the Environment and Other Legislation Amendment (Low Emissions Future) Bill 2025 in October to lift the moratorium. Polls showed mixed public support, with fluctuations during and after the 2025 election. A YouGov poll in November 2025 found 46% in favour of lifting legislative bans on nuclear power (31% opposed, 23% unsure), and 47% supporting the development of nuclear plants (34% opposed). Earlier, an Essential Research poll in April 2025 showed support dropping from 55% in February to 42%, with opposition rising to 44%. The National Climate Action Survey in May 2025 reported 59% favouring retention of the ban. The Lowy Institute Poll in June 2025 indicated 61% support for using nuclear in the energy mix.

== Membership ==
The membership of the committee was as follows:

Member	Party	Electorate
Voting
Dan Repacholi (chair)	Labor	Division of Hunter, New South Wales
Ted O'Brien (deputy chair)	Liberal National	Division of Fairfax, Queensland
Matt Burnell	Labor	Division of Spence, South Australia
Darren Chester	Nationals	Division of Gippsland, Victoria
Zaneta Mascarenhas	Labor	Division of Swan, Western Australia
Daniel Mulino	Labor	Division of Fraser, Victoria
Monique Ryan	Independent	Division of Kooyong, Victoria
Supplementary (non-voting)
Graham Perrett	Labor	Division of Moreton, Queensland
Simon Kennedy	Liberal	Division of Cook, New South Wales
