= Standing Committee on Publications =

Standing committee of the Australian House of Representatives

- 47th Parliament of Australia

Type
- Type: Standing Committee of the Australian House of Representatives

Leadership
- Chair: Fiona Phillips, Labor since 2 August 2022
- Deputy Chair: Ross Vasta, Liberal National since 2 August 2022

Structure
- Seats: 7
- Political groups: Government (4): Labor (4); Opposition (3): Liberal National (2); Liberal (1)

Meeting place
- Parliament House; Canberra, Australian Capital Territory; Australia

Website
- Standing Committee on Publications

Rules
- Standing Orders of the House of Representatives

The Standing Committee on Publications, also called the Publications Committee, is a committee of the Australian House of Representatives responsible for the consideration of documents presented to the House of Representatives. The committee is governed by Standing Order 219 and consists of seven members, four government members and three non-government members. The chair is appointed by the Prime Minister and the deputy chair by the Leader of the Opposition under Standing Order 232. The Committee usually meets together with its Senate counterpart, and together form the Joint Parliamentary Committee on Publications.

== Membership ==
=== 47th Parliament ===
In the 47th parliament (July 2022 – present), the membership of the committee is the following:

Member	Party	Electorate
Fiona Phillips (chair)	Labor	Division of Gilmore, New South Wales
Ross Vasta (deputy chair)	Liberal National	Division of Bonner, Queensland
Bridget Archer	Liberal	Division of Bass, Tasmania
Peter Khalil	Labor	Division of Wills, Victoria
Tania Lawrence	Labor	Division of Hasluck, Western Australia
Anne Stanley	Labor	Division of Werriwa, New South Wales
Andrew Willcox	Liberal National	Division of Dawson, Queensland

== See also ==
- Australian House of Representatives committees
