= Standing Committee on Agriculture =

Standing committee of the Australian House of Representatives

- 47th Parliament of Australia

Type
- Type: Standing Committee of the Australian House of Representatives

History
- Founded: 26 July 2022
- Preceded by: Standing Committee on Agriculture and Water Resources

Leadership
- Chair: Meryl Swanson, Labor
- Deputy Chair: Rick Wilson, Liberal

Structure
- Seats: 9
- Political groups: Government (5): Labor (5); Opposition (3): Liberal (2); Liberal National (1); Crossbench (1): Centre Alliance (1)

Meeting place
- Parliament House; Canberra, Australian Capital Territory; Australia

Website
- Standing Committee on Agriculture

Rules
- Standing Orders of the House of Representatives

The Standing Committee on Agriculture is a committee of the Australian House of Representatives. The committee is a "General Purpose Standing Committee" governed by Standing Order 215. It consists of nine members, five government members and four non-government members (three members of the official opposition and one member of the crossbench). The chair is appointed by the Prime Minister and the deputy chair by the Leader of the Opposition under Standing Order 232.

== History ==
While General Purpose Standing Committees of the House of Representatives were first established in 1987, Agriculture or Primary Industries were not explicitly called out until the amendment of Standing order 28B following the election of the Howard Government in 1996. The committee has been regularly renamed since; some recent names include:

Committee Name	Parliament(s)	Years
Primary Industries, Resources and Rural and Regional Affairs	38th	1996-8
Primary Industries and Regional Services	39th	1998-2001
Agriculture, Fisheries and Forestry	40th and 41st	2001-7
Primary Industries and Resources	42nd	2007-2010
Agriculture, Resources, Fisheries and Forestry	43rd	2010-2013
Agriculture and Industry	44th	2013-2016
Agriculture and Water Resources	45th to 46th	2013-2022
Agriculture	47th	2022-Present

== Membership ==
=== 47th Parliament ===
In the 47th parliament (July 2022 – present), the membership of the committee is the following:

Member	Party	Electorate
Meryl Swanson Chair	Labor	Division of Paterson, New South Wales
Rick Wilson Deputy Chair	Liberal	Division of O'Connor, Western Australia
Matt Burnell	Labor	Division of Spence, South Australia
Mike Freelander	Labor	Division of Macarthur, New South Wales
Brian Mitchell	Labor	Division of Lyons, Tasmania
Fiona Phillips	Labor	Division of Gilmore, New South Wales
Rebecca Sharkie	Centre Alliance	Division of Mayo, South Australia
Aaron Violi	Liberal	Division of Casey, Victoria
Andrew Willcox	Liberal National	Division of Dawson, Queensland

=== 45th Parliament ===
In the 45th parliament (September 2016 – 11 April 2019), the membership of the committee was the following:

Member	Party	Electorate
Rick Wilson Chair	Liberal	Division of O'Connor, Western Australia
Andrew Broad (until 24 August 2018)	Nationals	Division of Mallee, Victoria
Joel Fitzgibbon (from 15 June 2017 until 10 September 2018)	Labor	Division of Hunter, New South Wales
David Gillespie (from 10 September 2018)	Nationals	Division of Lyne, New South Wales
Justine Keay (until 10 May 18, from 10 September 2018)	Labor	Division of Braddon, Tasmania
Matt Keogh	Labor	Division of Burt, Western Australia
John McVeigh (until 20 December 2017)	Liberal National	Division of Groom, Queensland
Nola Marino (from 6 February 2018)	Liberal	Division of Forrest, Western Australia
Tony Pasin	Liberal	Division of Barker, South Australia
Rowan Ramsey	Liberal	Division of Grey, South Australia
Meryl Swanson (until 15 June 2017, from 21 May 2018)	Labor	Division of Paterson, New South Wales

McVeigh and Broad lost their positions on the committee upon joining the Ministry, with Marino and Gillespie being elected to replace each respectively. Swanson was discharged from the committee and replaced by Fitzgibbon. Swanson was again appointed to the committee when Keay lost her seat her seat in Parliament during the parliamentary eligibility crisis. Keay regained it at the ensuing by-election, and was reappointed to the committee in the place of Fitzgibbon.

== List of Chairs ==
Member	Party	Electorate	Parliament(s)	Years
Michael Ronaldson	Liberal	Division of Ballarat, Victoria	38th	1996
Fran Bailey	Liberal	Division of McEwen, Victoria	38th-39th	1996-2001
Kay Elson	Liberal	Division of Forde, Queensland	40th	2001-2004
Alby Schultz	Liberal	Division of Hume, New South Wales	41st	2004-2007
Dick Adams	Labor	Division of Lyons, Tasmania	42nd-43rd	2007-2013
Rowan Ramsey	Liberal	Division of Grey, South Australia	44th	2013-2016
Rick Wison	Liberal	Division of O'Connor, Western Australia	45th-46th	2016-2022
Meryl Swanson	Labor	Division of Paterson, New South Wales	47th	2022-present

== See also ==
- Australian House of Representatives committees
- United States House Committee on Agriculture
- United States Senate Committee on Agriculture, Nutrition and Forestry
