= Standing Committee on Climate Change, Energy, Environment and Water =

Standing committee of the Australian House of Representatives

- 47–48th Parliament of Australia

Type
- Type: Standing Committee of the Australian House of Representatives

History
- Founded: 26 July 2022
- Preceded by: Standing Committee on Energy and Environment; Standing Committee on Agriculture and Water Resources

Leadership
- Chair: Anne Urquhart, Labor
- Deputy Chair: Zali Steggall, Independent

Structure
- Seats: 10
- Political groups: Government (6): Labor (6); Opposition (2): Liberal (1); Liberal National (1); Crossbench (2): Independent (2)

Meeting place
- Parliament House; Canberra, Australian Capital Territory; Australia

Website
- Standing Committee on Climate Change, Energy, Environment and Water

Rules
- Standing Orders of the House of Representatives

The Standing Committee on Climate Change, Energy, Environment and Water is a committee of the Australian House of Representatives. The committee is a "General Purpose Standing Committee" governed by Standing Order 215. It consists of ten members, six government members and four non-government members (two members of the official opposition and two members of the crossbench). The chair is appointed by the Prime Minister and the deputy chair by the Leader of the Opposition under Standing Order 232.

== History ==
While General Purpose Standing Committees of the House of Representatives were first established in 1987, The committee has been regularly renamed since; some recent names include:

Committees		Parliament(s)
Environment, Recreation and the Arts		35th-38th
Environment and Heritage		39th-41st
Climate Change, Water, Environment and the Arts		42nd
Climate Change, Environment and the Arts		43rd
Environment and Energy	Agriculture and Water Resources	44th-46th
Climate Change, Energy, Environment and Water		47th–present

== Membership ==
=== 48th Parliament ===
In the 48th parliament (July 2025 – present), the membership of the committee is the following:

Member	Party	Electorate
Anne Urquhart Chair	Labor	Division of Braddon, Tasmania
Zali Steggall Deputy Chair	Independent	Division of Warringah, New South Wales
Carol Berry	Labor	Division of Whitlam, New South Wales
Nicolette Boele	Independent	Division of Bradfield, New South Wales
Colin Boyce	Liberal National	Division of Flynn, Queensland
Alison Byrnes	Labor	Division of Cunningham, Victoria
Emma Comer	Labor	Division of Petrie, Queensland
Tom French	Labor	Division of Moore, Western Australia
Simon Kennedy	Liberal	Division of Cook, New South Wales
Dan Repacholi	Labor	Division of Hunter, New South Wales

== List of Chairs ==
Member	Party	Electorate	Parliament(s)	Years
Tony Zappia	Labor	Division of Paterson, New South Wales	47th	2022-25
Anne Urquhart	Labor	Division of Braddon, Tasmania	48th	2025–present

== See also ==
- Australian House of Representatives committees
