= Jess Teesdale =

Australian politician

Jess Teesdale MP

Member of the Australian Parliament
- Incumbent
- Assumed office 3 May 2025
- Constituency: Bass

Personal details
- Born: 7 November 1987 (age 38) Launceston, Tasmania, Australia
- Party: Labor
- Education: University of Tasmania
- Profession: Teacher

Jessica Ann Teesdale (born 7 November 1987) is an Australian politician. She was elected to the Australian House of Representatives, unseating two term incumbent Bridget Archer at the 2025 Australian federal election for the Division of Bass.

Teesdale grew up in Launceston, and had been a school teacher at the Indie School there. She studied at the University of Tasmania 2006 to 2010 then commenced her teaching career in the Northern Territory for ten years before returning to Tasmania.

Parliament of Australia
Preceded by Bridget Archer	Member for Bass; 2025–present	Incumbent
