= 46th Parliament of Australia =

2019–2022 Australian legislative term

46th Parliament of the Commonwealth of Australia
- 45th ← → 47th
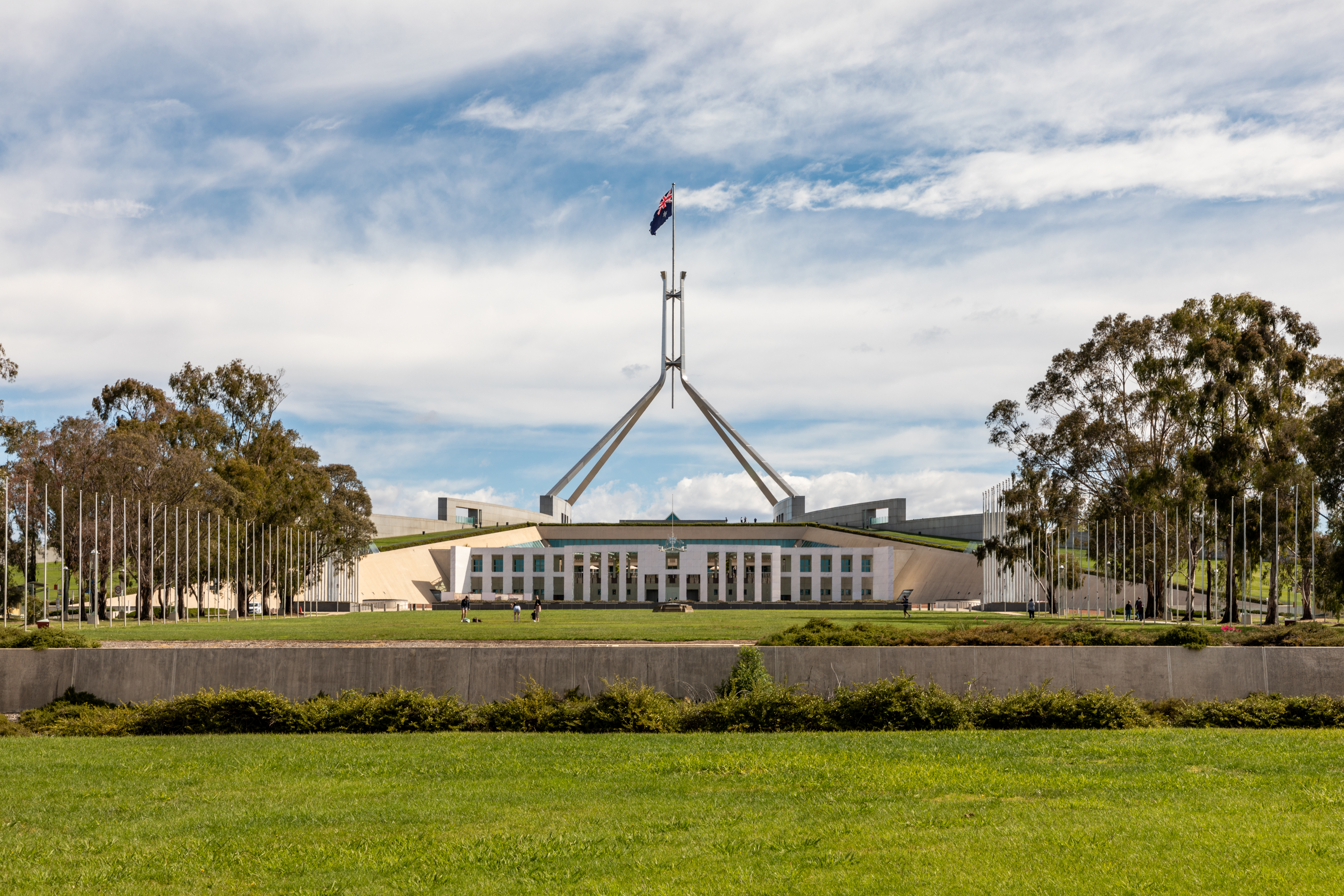
- Parliament House(2019) Parliament House (2019)

2 July 2019 – 11 April 2022
- Members: 76 senators 151 representatives
- Senate Leader: Mathias Cormann (until 30 October 2020); Simon Birmingham (from 30 October 2020)
- Senate President: Scott Ryan (until 13 October 2021); Slade Brockman (from 18 October 2021)
- House Leader: Christian Porter (until 30 March 2021); Peter Dutton (from 30 March 2021)
- House Speaker: Tony Smith (until 23 November 2021); Andrew Wallace (from 23 November 2021)

Sessions
- 1st: 2 July 2019 – 31 March 2022

The 46th Parliament of Australia was a meeting of the legislative branch of the Australian federal government, composed of the Australian Senate and the Australian House of Representatives. The 2019 federal election gave the Coalition of the Liberal and National Parties control of the House, originally with a three-seat majority, allowing their leader Scott Morrison to stay in office as the 30th Prime Minister of Australia. The 46th Parliament was opened in Canberra on 2 July 2019 and was dissolved by the Governor General David Hurley on 11 April 2022.

== 2019 federal election ==
=== House of Representatives ===
At the 2019 election, in the 151-seat House of Representatives, the incumbent Coalition government was reelected with 77 seats, a majority of two seats. The Labor opposition won 68 seats. Six other MPs were elected to the crossbench, with the Greens, Centre Alliance, Katter's Australian Party, and independents Andrew Wilkie, Helen Haines and Zali Steggall winning a seat each.

=== Senate ===
In the Senate, 40 of 76 seats were up for election. Following the election, the Coalition had a total of 35 seats, four short of a majority. Labor held 26 seats, the Greens held 9 seats, Centre Alliance and One Nation each held two seats, the Jacqui Lambie Network held one and one seat was held by independent Cory Bernardi, who deregistered the party he was previously a member of on 25 June 2019.

=== Composition ===

Government (77)
Coalition
Liberal (44)
Liberal National (23) (Note: 17 Liberal National Party of Queensland (LNP) MPs sat in the Liberals party room and 6 sat in the Nationals party room)
National (10)

Opposition (68)
Labor (68)

Crossbench (6)
Greens (1)
KAP (1)
Centre Alliance (1)
Independent (3) (Note: Independent MPs: Andrew Wilkie (Clark), Helen Haines (Indi), Zali Steggall (Warringah))

== Major events ==
- 2 July 2019: Parliament is opened by the newly appointed Governor-General, David Hurley.
- 25 July 2019: The government's legislation repealing provisions allowing the medical transfer to Australia of refugees passes the lower house, despite vociferous objection by Labor and other minor party MPs. The original legislation's passage in the previous parliament represented the first time a government had lost a substantial vote in the House of Representatives in 90 years.
- 24 November 2019: Channel 9's 60 Minutes program airs a report alleging that a Chinese intelligence group offered one million dollars to pay for the political campaign of a Liberal Party member to run in an eastern suburbs seat, as part of an operation to place a Chinese agent in Parliament. The Australian Security Intelligence Organisation later confirms the legitimacy of the story and reveals an ongoing investigation into the matter. See the 2019 Australian Parliament infiltration plot article for further details.
- 3 February 2020: The Deputy Leader of the National Party Bridget McKenzie resigns from her leadership position and from Cabinet amidst a "sports rorts affair" that sees McKenzie oversee a community sports grants program that appears to be politically biased toward clubs located in marginal or target seats for the Government. At the subsequent leadership spill Deputy Prime Minister Michael McCormack narrowly avoids being removed from the position after being challenged by Barnaby Joyce.
- 23 February 2021: Liberal MP Craig Kelly resigns from the Liberal Party to sit on the crossbench as an independent, reducing the Liberal/National government to a one-seat majority. He confirms he will continue to support the government on confidence and supply. Kelly later joins Clive Palmer's United Australia Party, becoming its "leader."

=== March 2020 coronavirus suspension ===
Around 23 March 2020, Parliament was suspended due to the COVID-19 pandemic in Australia; an adjournment rather than prorogation. Parliamentary sittings were shut down and scheduled to resume in August. Its committees would continue to operate using technology. This unprecedented move was accompanied by two motions raised by the Attorney-General of Australia, Christian Porter, and passed on 23 March 2020. One motion was designed to allow MPs to participate in parliament by electronic means, if agreed by the major parties and the speaker; the second determined that with the agreement of the two major parties, the standing orders could be amended without requiring an absolute majority. Shortly before this, a special intergovernmental decision-making forum, the National Cabinet, composed of the head of the Commonwealth (the Prime Minister) and the premiers and chief ministers of the Australian states and territories was established on 18 March 2020 to coordinate the national response to the pandemic.

== Major legislation ==
- The Treasury Laws Amendment (Tax Relief So Working Australians Keep More Of Their Money) Bill 2019 passes the parliament on 4 July 2019. The legislation, providing $158 billion in income tax cuts, was the government's signature election policy. Despite opposing Stage 3 of the legislation, which would flatten the tax rate to 30% for all workers earning between $45,000 and $200,000, Labor votes in favour of the bill and only the Greens vote against the bill at the third reading.
- The Counter-Terrorism (Temporary Exclusion Orders) Bill 2019 and related legislation passes the parliament on 25 July 2019. The legislation gives the Minister the power to block a person aged over 14 years of age (including an Australian citizen) from returning to Australia for up to two years if the minister “suspects on reasonable grounds” that a temporary exclusion order would prevent support or assistance to a terrorist organisation. The government refused to support all the amendments recommended by the Parliamentary Joint Committee on Intelligence and Security and supported by Labor, leading to concerns regarding the constitutional validity of the bill.

== Membership changes ==
This table lists members of the House or Senate who resigned, died, were elected or appointed, or otherwise changed their party affiliation during the 46th Parliament.

Seat	Before		Change		After		
Seat	Member	Party	Type	Date	Date	Member	Party
Vic (Senate)	Mitch Fifield	Liberal	Resignation	16 August 2019	11 September 2019	Sarah Henderson	Liberal
NSW (Senate)	Arthur Sinodinos	Liberal	Resignation	11 November 2019	14 November 2019	Jim Molan	Liberal
SA (Senate)	Cory Bernardi	Independent	Resignation	20 January 2020	6 February 2020	Andrew McLachlan	Liberal
Wide Bay	Llew O'Brien	National	Departure from party-room (Note: O'Brien was elected as a Liberal National Party (LNP) MP and sat in the Nationals party-room. He left the party-room (caucus) on 10 February 2020 after initiating a failed leadership spill, and sat as an LNP MP, still part of the Coalition government but not as one who sat in either the National, Liberal or joint party-room meetings. On 10 December 2020 he rejoined the Nationals party-room.)	10 February 2020		Llew O'Brien	Liberal National
Eden-Monaro	Mike Kelly	Labor	Resignation	30 April 2020	24 August 2020	Kristy McBain	Labor
SA (Senate)	Rex Patrick	Centre Alliance	Defection from party	9 August 2020		Rex Patrick	Independent
Vic (Senate)	Richard Di Natale	Greens	Resignation	26 August 2020	4 September 2020	Lidia Thorpe	Greens
Groom	John McVeigh	Liberal National	Resignation	18 September 2020	28 November 2020	Garth Hamilton	Liberal National
WA (Senate)	Mathias Cormann	Liberal	Resignation	6 November 2020	25 November 2020	Ben Small	Liberal
Wide Bay	Llew O'Brien	Liberal National	Return to party-room	7 December 2020		Llew O'Brien	National
SA (Senate)	Rex Patrick	Independent	Formation of new party	7 January 2021		Rex Patrick	Rex Patrick Team
Hughes	Craig Kelly	Liberal	Defection from party	23 February 2021		Craig Kelly	Independent
Hughes	Craig Kelly	Independent	Joined new party	23 August 2021		Craig Kelly	United Australia
SA (Senate)	Alex Gallacher	Labor	Death	29 August 2021	21 September 2021	Karen Grogan	Labor
WA (Senate)	Rachel Siewert	Greens	Resignation	6 September 2021	14 September 2021	Dorinda Cox	Greens
Gippsland	Darren Chester	National	Departure from party-room (Note: On 26 September 2021 Chester announced he would no longer attend party-room meetings of the Nationals, though would continue to sit with the government.)	26 September 2021		Darren Chester	National (outside party-room)
Vic (Senate)	Scott Ryan	Liberal	Resignation	13 October 2021	2 December 2021	Greg Mirabella	Liberal
NT (Senate)	Sam McMahon	Country Liberal	Defection from party	28 January 2022		Sam McMahon	Independent
Spence	Nick Champion	Labor	Resignation	22 February 2022	None (Note: Champion resigned on 22 February 2022 to run for the state seat of Taylor in the upcoming South Australian state election. There was no by-election held in his federal seat of Spence due to his resignation occurring close to the federal election in May (see here).)		
Vic (Senate)	Kimberley Kitching	Labor	Death	10 March 2022	6 April 2022	Jana Stewart	Labor
Dawson	George Christensen	Liberal National	Resignation (Note: Christensen was elected as Liberal National Party MP and sat in the Nationals party-room. He resigned from the Liberal National Party on 7 April 2022, four days prior to the dissolution of the House of Representatives.)	7 April 2022		George Christensen	Independent
NT (Senate)	Sam McMahon	Independent	Joined new party	8 April 2022		Sam McMahon	Liberal Democrats
WA (Senate)	Ben Small	Liberal	Resignation	15 April 2022	18 May 2022	Ben Small	Liberal

== See also ==
- 45th Parliament of Australia
- 47th Parliament of Australia
- Morrison Government
- 2020s in Australian political history
