= Matt Burnell =

Australian politician (born 1978)

Matt Burnell MP
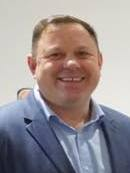
- Burnell in 2024

Member of the Australian House of Representatives for Spence
- Incumbent
- Assumed office 21 May 2022
- Preceded by: Nick Champion

Personal details
- Born: 25 August 1978 (age 47) Mildura, Victoria, Australia
- Party: Australian Labor Party
- Spouse: Cassandra
- Occupation: Union organiser Politician

Matthew Paul Burnell (born 25 August 1978) has been the member of the Australian House of Representatives for the Division of Spence in South Australia since he was elected at the 2022 Australian federal election. He is a member of the Labor Right faction of the Australian Labor Party and supporter of AUKUS as co-chair of the Parliamentary Friends of AUKUS with Liberal MP Aaron Violi.

== Early life ==
Burnell grew up on his family's citrus farm near Mildura in Victoria. He joined the Army Reserves then worked as a truck driver and later seafarer. He became a union organiser in the Transport Workers' Union in 2016. He lives in Hillbank with his wife Cassandra.

Parliament of Australia
Preceded by Nick Champion	Member for Spence; 2022–present	Incumbent
