= Mary Aldred =

Australian politician

Mary Aldred MP

Member of the Australian Parliament for Monash
- Incumbent
- Assumed office 3 May 2025
- Preceded by: Russell Broadbent

Personal details
- Born: 9 March 1983 (age 43) Melbourne, Victoria, Australia
- Party: Liberal
- Parent: Ken Aldred (father)
- Education: Monash University (BA, Hons), University of Melbourne (MAgBus), Federation University (MBA)
- Website: www.liberal.org.au/team/mary-aldred/

Mary Aldred (born 9 March 1983) is an Australian politician from the Liberal Party. She is a member of the Australian Parliament for the Division of Monash after winning the seat in the 2025 Australian federal election. On 12 November 2023, Aldred beat Russell Broadbent for the Liberal preselection. She went on to defeat Broadbent and the Labor candidate to retain Monash for the Liberals at the 2025 federal election. Aldred endorsed Sussan Ley in the 2025 Liberal Party of Australia leadership election.

Aldred was the founding CEO of the Committee for Gippsland and has been CEO of the Franchise Council of Australia.

== Personal life ==
Aldred is the daughter of Ken Aldred, who was also a Liberal Party federal MP between 1975 and 1980 and between 1983 and 1996.

Parliament of Australia
Preceded by Russell Broadbent	Member for Monash; 2025–present	Incumbent
