= Terry Young (Australian politician) =

Australian politician (born 1968)

Terry Young MP
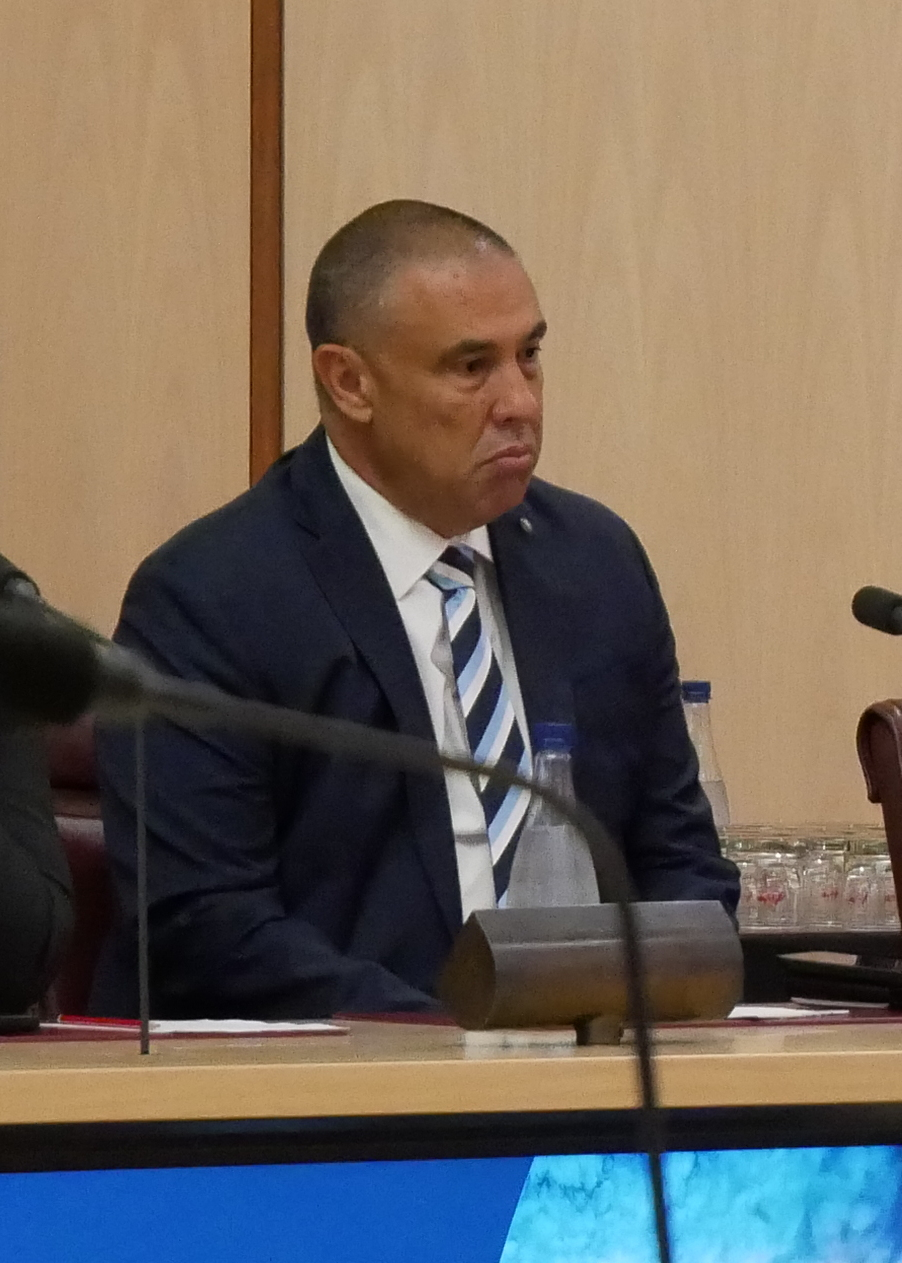
- Young in 2023

6th Second Deputy Speaker of the Australian House of Representatives
- Incumbent
- Assumed office 22 July 2025
- Speaker: Milton Dick
- Preceded by: Ian Goodenough

Member of the Australian Parliament for Longman
- Incumbent
- Assumed office 18 May 2019
- Preceded by: Susan Lamb

Personal details
- Born: 20 February 1968 (age 58) Brisbane, Queensland, Australia
- Party: Liberal National
- Children: 4
- Education: Dakabin State High School; Kallangur Primary School
- Occupation: Small Businessman; Politician
- Website: www.terryyoung.com.au

Terry James Young (born 20 February 1968) is an Australian politician who has been a member of the House of Representatives since the 2019 federal election, representing the Division of Longman in Queensland. He is a member of the Liberal National Party of Queensland and sits with the Liberal Party in federal parliament.

== Early life ==
Young was born on 20 February 1968 in Brisbane, Queensland. His mother Rita was a schoolteacher and his father Jim was a journalist and newspaper editor. He is of South Sea Islander descent, with one of his ancestors brought to Australia as a Kanaka. (Note: Different versions of Young's first speech state that the ancestor was his grandfather or great-grandfather.) Young attended Kallangur Primary School and Dakabin State High School. He left school at the age of 15, subsequently working as a garage attendant, factory hand, and storeperson.

Young is one of just 4 members of the 46th through 48th Parliaments of Australia who did not graduate from high school, the others being Julie Collins, Llew O'Brien and Jacqui Lambie.

== Business career ==
Young joined appliance chain Chandlers as a sales assistant in 1988 and by 1991 was manager of its Caboolture store. He worked for Philips between 1996 and 2000 as a manager in its electronics and car audio divisions. In 2001 he became a joint franchisee of The Good Guys in Morayfield. He later established Drummond Golf franchises in Lawnton, Maroochydore and Gosford, New South Wales.

== Politics ==
In November 2018, Young won LNP preselection for the Division of Longman. He had previously contested preselection for the 2018 Longman by-election, but was defeated by Trevor Ruthenberg. At the 2019 federal election, he defeated the incumbent Labor MP Susan Lamb with a four-point swing.

Young serves on the House of Representatives Standing committees for "Employment, Education and Training", "Indigenous Affairs" and "Tax and Revenue", which he was appointed to on 4 July 2019.

According to The Courier-Mail, Young is Caboolture's second most influential person of 2021.

=== Political views ===
Young is a member of the National Right faction of the Liberal Party, after previously being aligned with the centre-right faction during the Morrison government years.

In his maiden speech to parliament, Young stated "I love being a conservative and I love being part of a conservative government". He also said that children should not be "brain-washed with extreme left or right ideologies" but that "we want our children and grandchildren to hear the theories of evolution and creation, different religions, climate change advocates and climate change sceptics”.

== Personal life ==
Young had two sons and two daughters with his first wife, whom he married at the age of 21; one of his sons died of sudden infant death syndrome. He later had another daughter with his second wife; his wife died in April 2026.

== Notes ==
Parliament of Australia
| Preceded by Susan Lamb | Member for Longman; 2019–present | Incumbent |
