= Llew O'Brien =

Australian politician (born 1972)

Llew O'Brien MP
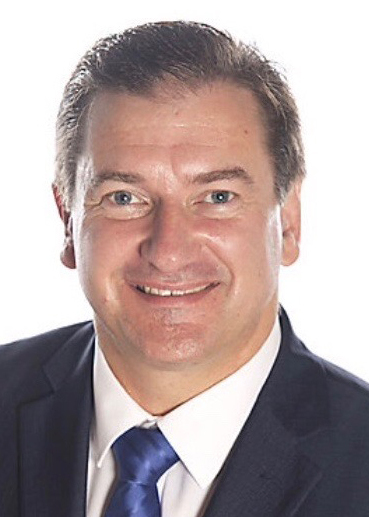

Deputy Speaker of the Australian House of Representatives
- In office 10 February 2020 – 11 April 2022
- Preceded by: Kevin Hogan
- Succeeded by: Sharon Claydon

Member of the Australian Parliament for Wide Bay
- Incumbent
- Assumed office 2 July 2016
- Preceded by: Warren Truss

Personal details
- Born: 26 June 1972 (age 54) Mona Vale, New South Wales, Australia
- Citizenship: Australia; Canada (since 2025) (Note: As a result of the Parliament of Canada passing Bill C-3 on 15 December 2025, O'Brien became a citizen of Canada through descent due to his Canadian-born grandfather and father. O'Brien announced his intention to relinquish his Canadian citizenship on 6 February 2026 due to section 44(i) of the Australian Constitution prohibiting parliamentarians from holding dual citizenship.)
- Party: Liberal National
- Other political affiliations: Nationals (parliamentary)
- Spouse: Sharon O'Brien
- Occupation: Police officer
- Awards: Queensland Police Service Medal
- Website: https://llewobrien.com.au

Llewellyn Stephen O'Brien (born 26 June 1972) is an Australian politician who has been a member of the House of Representatives since the 2016 federal election, representing the Division of Wide Bay. He was deputy speaker of the House from February 2020 to April 2022. He is a member of the Liberal National Party of Queensland (LNP) and sits with the Nationals in federal parliament.

== Early life ==
O'Brien was born on 26 June 1972 in Mona Vale, New South Wales. He left school at the age of 15 to become a full-time carer for his mother, who had been diagnosed with motor neurone disease and died a year later. He subsequently worked as a labourer and factory process operator. He met his future wife Sharon when he was 17.

O'Brien is one of just four members of the 46th Parliament of Australia who did not graduate from high school, the others being Julie Collins, Jacqui Lambie and Terry Young.

== Police career ==
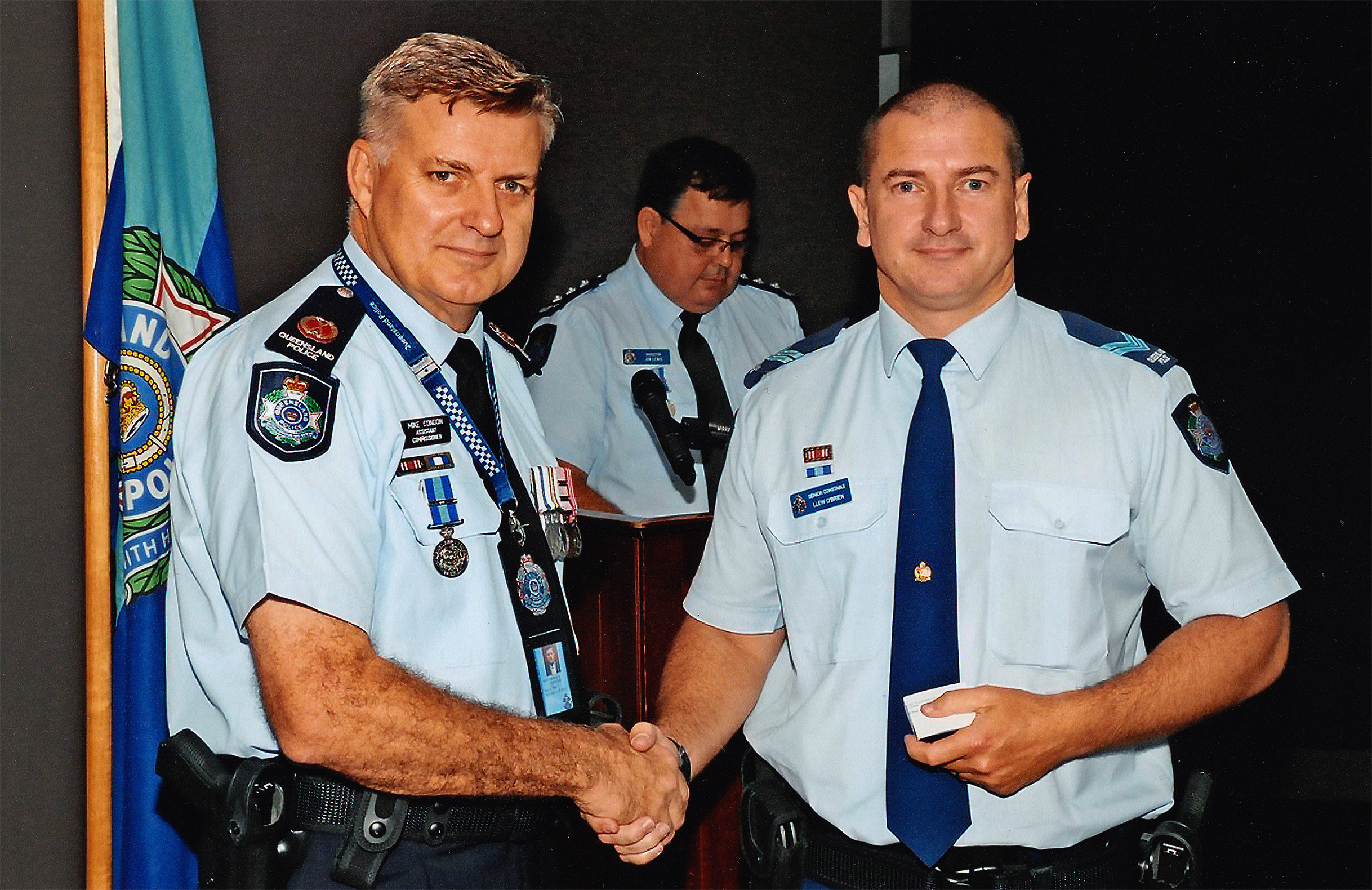
O'Brien receiving the 15 year clasp to the QPS Medal for ethical and diligent service, April 2015

Prior to his election, O'Brien served as a police officer. He joined the Queensland Police in 1999. In his first speech in Parliament he spoke of his own decade long experience of living with posttraumatic stress disorder brought about while serving as a traffic accident investigator. In December 2013, O'Brien was accused of having misused police resources for political purposes. He was investigated and faced managerial action, but was cleared of the allegations by Queensland Police.

O'Brien has received both State and National medals for his Police service between 1999 and 2016. In 2010 he was awarded the Queensland Police Service Medal. In 2011 he was awarded the Queensland Flood and Cyclone Citation. In April 2015 he was awarded a 15-year clasp to the Queensland Police Service Medal. In 2016 he was awarded both the National Police Service Medal and the National Medal for ethical and diligent service.

== Political career ==
O'Brien became a member of the National Party of Queensland in 2006, and joined the Liberal National Party of Queensland upon its formation in 2008. He has served in many roles within the parties, including Vice President, Regional Chairman, State Executive, Branch Chairman and Campaign Chairman.

After the retirement announcement of long serving Member of Wide Bay and Deputy Prime Minister Warren Truss, O'Brien was preselected for the 2016 federal election and won the seat. He has served on the Joint Standing Committees for the Australian Commission for Law Enforcement Integrity; and Law Enforcement; as well as the House of Representatives Standing Committees for Indigenous Affairs; and Infrastructure, Transport and Cities. In 2016, O'Brien was also appointed as the Queensland Chair of the Federal Government's Black Spot Advisory Panel for 2016/17 by Minister for Infrastructure and Transport Darren Chester.

=== National Party resignation ===
In February 2020, O'Brien moved a spill motion for Barnaby Joyce to challenge Michael McCormack for leadership of the National Party. The challenge failed, and on 10 February O'Brien announced that he would no longer sit in the Nationals party room, but would remain a member of the LNP and continue to support the Morrison government. O'Brien was subsequently elected as Deputy Speaker of the House of Representatives, having been nominated unexpectedly by the Opposition against the Government's nominated choice, Damian Drum.

O'Brien rejoined the Nationals partyroom on 7 December 2020.

== Notes ==
Parliament of Australia
| Preceded by Warren Truss | Member for Wide Bay; 2016–present | Incumbent |
| Preceded by Kevin Hogan | Deputy Speaker of the House of Representatives; 2020–2022 | Succeeded by Sharon Claydon |
