= Joanne Ryan (politician) =

Australian politician (born 1961)

Joanne Ryan MP

Chief Government Whip in the House of Representatives
- Incumbent
- Assumed office 31 May 2022
- Prime Minister: Anthony Albanese
- Preceded by: Bert van Manen

Member of the Australian Parliament for Lalor
- Incumbent
- Assumed office 7 September 2013
- Preceded by: Julia Gillard

Personal details
- Born: Joanne Catherine Ryan; 29 July 1961 (age 65) Werribee, Victoria, Australia
- Party: Australian Labor Party
- Spouse: John Murnane
- Children: 3
- Education: Melbourne State College
- Profession: Teacher; Politician
- Website: www.joanneryan.com.au

Joanne Catherine Ryan (born 29 July 1961) is an Australian politician and former schoolteacher. She is a member of the Australian Labor Party (ALP) and has served in the House of Representatives since 2013, representing the Division of Lalor in Melbourne's western suburbs. Following the election of the Albanese Labor Government, Joanne Ryan was elected Chief Government Whip in the House of Representatives. She was a primary school principal immediately prior to her election.

== Early life and teaching career ==
Ryan was born on 29 July 1961 in Werribee, Victoria. She was the seventh of eight children born to Dot (née Farrell) and Gerald Ryan. Her father – who farmed dairy cattle, sheep and grain – died in 1973. Ryan attended St. Andrew's Catholic Primary School and Mary MacKillop Girls College.

Ryan worked as a packer and sales clerk before starting a teaching degree at Melbourne State College in 1980. She worked as a teacher at Darwin High School in the Northern Territory before returning to Victoria and teaching at Laverton High School and Galvin Park Secondary College. She was an assistant principal and acting principal at Galvin Park, and then was appointed principal of Moonee Ponds Central School. She resigned the principalship after 18 months in order to stand for parliament in 2013.

From 1996 to 1998, Ryan served as chair of Werribee Residents Against Toxic Dump (WRATD), which successfully campaigned against CSR converting its Werribee quarry into a "prescribed waste landfill". She later co-wrote a play about the campaign with Janet Brown, titled A Hole in the Ground.

== Political career ==
In 2013, Ryan won ALP preselection for the Division of Lalor following the retirement of former prime minister Julia Gillard. She was given special dispensation to be a candidate for preselection, as she had not been a party member for at least 12 months before the ballot. She was endorsed for preselection by Gillard, who had worked with her during the 1990s. Several other candidates withdrew during the preselection process, including future senator Kimberley Kitching who had been endorsed by Bill Shorten.

Ryan retained Lalor for the ALP at the 2013 federal election. She has since been re-elected at the 2016, 2019, 2022 and 2025 federal elections. She has served as one of her party's whips since October 2013 and was elected Chief Government Whip following Labor's return to government in 2022.

In September 2017, Ryan intervened in the preselection process for the state seat of Tarneit, calling on the ALP to expel candidate Intaj Khan. In response, Khan threatened to sue her for defamation.

Parliament of Australia
Preceded by Julia Gillard	Member for Lalor; 2013–present	Incumbent
