= Division of Lalor =

Australian federal electoral division

Coordinates: 37.796°S 144.614°E

Lalor Australian House of Representatives Division
- Interactive map of electorate boundaries from the 2025 federal election
- Created: 1949
- MP: Joanne Ryan
- Party: Labor
- Namesake: Peter Lalor
- Electors: 114,533 (2025)
- Area: 180 km^{2} (69.5 sq mi)
- Demographic: Outer metropolitan

The Division of Lalor (/lɔːlər/ LAW-lər) is an Australian Electoral Division in the state of Victoria. Located in the south-western suburbs of Melbourne in the City of Wyndham, it includes the south-western hub of Werribee as well as the suburbs of Hoppers Crossing, Tarneit, Truganina, Wyndham Vale and part of Point Cook.

At 9.0%, Lalor has the nation's highest proportion of children aged under 4 years old. It has the nation's lowest proportion of residents aged 65 and over (7.0%), is sixth highest nationally for families being couples with dependent children (44.4%), and has the sixth highest rate of residents purchasing their own homes (49.3%).

Lalor has been represented by Joanne Ryan, the Chief Government Whip, since the 2013 federal election.

== Geography ==
Since 1984, federal electoral division boundaries in Australia have been determined at redistributions by a redistribution committee appointed by the Australian Electoral Commission. Redistributions occur for the boundaries of divisions in a particular state, and they occur every seven years, or sooner if a state's representation entitlement changes or when divisions of a state are malapportioned.

When the division was created in 1949, it replaced a majority of the Division of Corio, effectively splitting the latter into the Lalor and a much smaller Corio. It also replaced some eastern parts of the Division of Ballaarat at the Macedon Ranges, and western parts of the Division of Deakin around the Hume Highway. The division covered the western and northern parts of Melbourne, including Werribee, Altona, Sunshine, Essendon Airport, Broadmeadows, Thomastown, Epping and the division's namesake Lalor. It also covered a large area west and north outside Melbourne, and included towns such as Lara, Bacchus Marsh, Melton, Kyneton, Gisborne, Sunbury, Lancefield, Kilmore, Wallan and Seymour. In 1955, it lost Lara to the Division of Corio, Bacchus Marsh to the Division of Ballaarat, and Kyneton and Seymour to the Division of Bendigo. However, it gained the Whittlesea, Doreen and Kinglake West areas from the Division of Deakin.

In 1968, the division repeated what had happened to its predecessor (Corio) twenty years prior. The division was significant shrunk in size, and areas were replaced by the new Division of Burke, an expanded Division of Bendigo, and to a smaller extent, the new Division of Diamond Valley. This meant Lalor was effectively split Lalor into Burke, Bendigo, Diamond Valley and a smaller Lalor:

- the division of Bendigo was expanded to cover the northern one-third of Lalor, and included the towns along Calder Highway and Hume Highway such as Gisborne and Kilmore
- the new division of Burke covered the middle one-third of Lalor and included Wallan, Sunbury, Melton and the northern suburbs of Melbourne such as Broadmeadows and Epping
- the reduced division of Lalor only covered its southern one-third in the western and south-western suburbs of Melbourne (City of Sunshine and Shires of Altona and Werribee). This included Sunshine, St Albans and Werribee. As a result, the division of Lalor also no longer included the suburb of Lalor.
- a small eastern portion of the original Lalor at Whittlesea, Kinglake West and Doreen became part of the new Division of Diamond Valley

The division lost Sunshine in 1977 and then St Albans in 1984. Also in 1984, the division regained Melton (which it lost to Burke in 1968). Then in 1989, the division lost Melton again, but regained Lara (which it lost to Corio in 1955). However, this gain was also reversed in 1994.

Since then until present (as of 2025), the division of Lalor is roughly based around the City of Wyndham area, though it had briefly regained Melton between 2003 and 2010 after the abolition of Burke.

== History ==
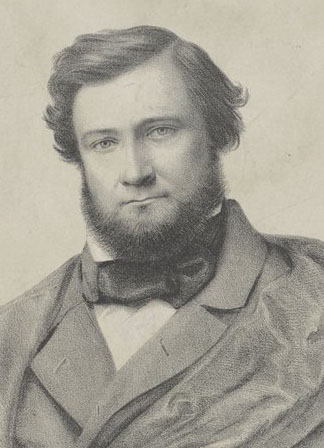
Peter Lalor, the division's namesake

The Division was proclaimed at the redistribution of 11 May 1949, and was first contested at the 1949 Federal election. It was named after Peter Lalor, the leader of the miners at the Eureka Stockade, and a former member of the Victorian Legislative Assembly. It was first won by Reg Pollard of the Labor Party, after he had transferred from the Division of Ballaarat due to Lalor replacing parts of the Ballaarat.

Lalor is a safe seat for the Labor Party, which has held it for all except three years of its existence, when it was lost to Mervyn Lee of the Liberal Party in the 1966 landslide. However, the redistribution ahead of the 1969 election, which shrunk the seat to a quarter of its original area in south-west Melbourne, made it a notional Labor seat of a 6% margin over the Liberal Party. Labor retook the seat easily and has since held it without difficulty.

It has been held by a succession of senior Labor members: Julia Gillard, Prime Minister of Australia from 2010 to 2013; Barry Jones, former minister for science under Bob Hawke and Labor national president; and Jim Cairns, former treasurer and deputy prime minister under Gough Whitlam. As Gillard was deputy prime minister prior to becoming prime minister, Lalor is therefore the only federal electorate to have been held by two deputy prime ministers.

The current member for Lalor since the 2013 election is Joanne Ryan.

== Members ==
| Image | Member | Party | Term | Notes |
|---|---|---|---|---|
| | Reg Pollard (1894–1981) | Labor | 10 December 1949 – 26 November 1966 | Previously held the Division of Ballaarat. Lost seat |
| | Mervyn Lee (1920–2009) | Liberal | 26 November 1966 – 25 October 1969 | Did not contest in 1969. Failed to win the Division of Bendigo |
| | Jim Cairns (1914–2003) | Labor | 25 October 1969 – 10 November 1977 | Previously held the Division of Yarra. Served as minister and deputy prime minister under Whitlam. Retired |
| | Barry Jones (1932–) | Labor | 10 December 1977 – 31 August 1998 | Previously held the Victorian Legislative Assembly seat of Melbourne. Served as minister under Hawke. Retired |
| | Julia Gillard (1961–) | Labor | 3 October 1998 – 5 August 2013 | Served as minister and deputy prime minister under Rudd. Served as prime minister from 2010 to 2013. Retired |
| | Joanne Ryan (1961–) | Labor | 7 September 2013 – present | Incumbent. Currently serving as Chief Government Whip in the House under Albanese |

== Election results ==
2025 Australian federal election: Lalor
| Party | Candidate | Votes | % | ±% |
|---|---|---|---|---|
| Labor | Joanne Ryan | 43,284 | 43.60 | −0.53 |
| Liberal | Mira D'Silva | 25,869 | 26.06 | +1.14 |
| Greens | Owen Parris | 15,181 | 15.29 | +4.94 |
| One Nation | Jason Oosthuizen | 6,986 | 7.04 | +3.06 |
| Family First | Matthew Emerson | 4,578 | 4.61 | +4.61 |
| Independent | Aijaz Moinuddin | 2,101 | 2.12 | −0.67 |
| Libertarian | Patrizia Barcatta | 1,285 | 1.29 | −2.57 |
| Total formal votes | | 99,284 | 96.02 | +2.13 |
| Informal votes | | 4,120 | 3.98 | −2.13 |
| Turnout | | 103,404 | 90.31 | +11.87 |
Two-party-preferred result
| Labor | Joanne Ryan | 62,761 | 63.21 | +0.42 |
| Liberal | Mira D'Silva | 36,523 | 36.79 | −0.42 |
| Labor hold | | Swing | +0.42 | |
