= Anne Stanley (politician) =

Australian politician (born 1961)

Anne Stanley MP

Member of the Australian Parliament for Werriwa
- Incumbent
- Assumed office 2 July 2016
- Preceded by: Laurie Ferguson

Councillor for Liverpool City Council
- In office 2012–2016
- Constituency: South Ward
- In office 2008–2012
- Constituency: North Ward

Personal details
- Born: Anne Maree Mee; 6 October 1961 (age 64) Sydney
- Party: Labor
- Spouse: Larry
- Occupation: Bank officer
- Website: www.annestanley.com.au

Anne Maree Stanley (née Mee; born 6 October 1961) is an Australian politician. She is a member of the Australian Labor Party (ALP) and has served in the House of Representatives since the 2016 federal election, representing the Division of Werriwa. She previously served on the Liverpool City Council from 2008 to 2016.

== Early life ==
Stanley was born in Sydney, one of two daughters born to Margaret (née Davison) and William Mee. Her parents were both ALP supporters, and her mother worked for the Building Workers' Industrial Union of Australia.

Prior to entering politics, Stanley worked as a bank officer for nearly 30 years.

== Politics ==
Stanley joined the Australian Labor Party (ALP) in 1996 "as a response to the reactionary policies of the Howard government". She was an officeholder in the party's organisational wing before her election to parliament, serving as a delegate to state and national conferences and as president of the party's Liverpool South branch. She served on the Liverpool City Council from 2008 to 2016.

=== Parliament ===
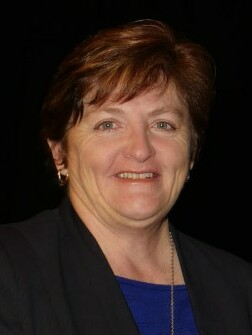
Stanley in 2016

In March 2016 Stanley won ALP preselection for the Division of Werriwa. She retained the seat for Labor at the 2016 federal election, succeeding the retiring member Laurie Ferguson. She was re-elected at the 2019 election, and was subsequently appointed as an opposition whip. She was again re-elected at the 2022 Australian federal election and was appointed as a government whip, a position she retained after her re-election in 2025.

== Personal life ==
Stanley has five children with her husband Larry. Her twin sons were born 11 weeks premature and spent time in the neonatal intensive care unit at Westmead Hospital.

Parliament of Australia
Preceded by Laurie Ferguson	Member for Werriwa; 2016–present	Incumbent
