= Opposition (Australia) =

Second largest party in the Australian House of Representatives

In Australian parliamentary practice, the Opposition or the Official Opposition consists of the second largest party or coalition of parties in the Australian House of Representatives, with its leader being given the title Leader of the Opposition. The Opposition serves the same function as the official opposition in other Commonwealth of Nations monarchies that follow the Westminster conventions and practices. It is seen as the alternative government and the existing administration's main opponent in the Australian Parliament and at a general election. By convention, the Opposition Leader in the federal Parliament comes from the House of Representatives, as does the deputy, although the Government and Opposition may also both have leaders in the Senate. The Opposition is sometimes styled as His Majesty's Loyal Opposition to show that, although the group may be against the sitting government, it remains loyal to the Crown (the embodiment of the Australian state), and thus to Australia.

The current Opposition at a federal level is the centre-right Liberal Party, led by Angus Taylor.

== State and territory opposition ==
The opposition parties and leaders in the Australian states and territories are:

| State/territory | Opposition party/coalition | Leader of the Opposition | Term start | Tenure | Main article |
|---|---|---|---|---|---|
| Australian Capital Territory | Liberal | Mark Parton | 10 November 2025 | 349 days | link |
| New South Wales | Liberal (Coalition) | Kellie Sloane | 21 November 2025 | 338 days | link |
| New South Wales | National (Coalition) | Kellie Sloane | 21 November 2025 | 338 days | link |
| Northern Territory | Labor | Selena Uibo | 3 September 2024 | 2 years, 52 days | link |
| Queensland | Labor | Steven Miles | 28 October 2024 | 1 year, 362 days | link |
| South Australia | Liberal | Ashton Hurn | 8 December 2025 | 321 days | link |
| Tasmania | Labor | Josh Willie | 20 August 2025 | 1 year, 66 days | link |
| Victoria | Liberal (Coalition) | Jess Wilson | 18 November 2025 | 341 days | link |
| Victoria | National (Coalition) | Jess Wilson | 18 November 2025 | 341 days | link |
| Western Australia | Liberal | Basil Zempilas | 25 March 2025 | 1 year, 214 days | link |
| Western Australia | National | Basil Zempilas | 25 March 2025 | 1 year, 214 days | link |

== See also ==
- List of federal Opposition Leaders
- Shadow Ministry of Australia
