= Electoral results for the Division of Menzies =

Australian division election results

This is a list of electoral results for the Division of Menzies in Australian federal elections from the division's creation in 1984 until the present.

== Members ==
Member	Party	Term
Neil Brown	Liberal	1984–1991
Kevin Andrews	Liberal	1991–2022
Keith Wolahan	Liberal	2022–2025
Gabriel Ng	Labor	2025–present

== Election results ==
=== Elections in the 2020s ===
==== 2025 ====
2025 Australian federal election: Menzies
Party	Candidate	Votes	%	±%
Liberal	Keith Wolahan	44,398	40.69	−0.25
Labor	Gabriel Ng	37,880	34.71	+2.91
Greens	Bill Pheasant	11,935	10.94	−1.96
Independent	Stella Yee	6,942	6.36	+6.36
Trumpet of Patriots	Amanda Paliouras	2,703	2.48	+1.68
One Nation	Jhett Edwards-Scott	2,139	1.96	+0.00
Family First	Ann Seeley	1,761	1.61	+1.61
Libertarian	Joshua Utoyo	1,360	1.25	+1.25
Total formal votes		109,118	96.05	−0.52
Informal votes		4,491	3.95	+0.52
Turnout		113,609	93.85	+0.12
Two-party-preferred result
Labor	Gabriel Ng	55,689	51.04	+0.62
Liberal	Keith Wolahan	53,429	48.96	−0.62
Labor hold		Swing	+0.62	

Results are not final. Last updated on 16 May 2025 at 10:40 PM AEST.

==== 2022 ====
2022 Australian federal election: Menzies
Party	Candidate	Votes	%	±%
Liberal	Keith Wolahan	42,526	42.10	−8.77
Labor	Naomi Oakley	33,635	33.30	+2.77
Greens	Bill Pheasant	14,289	14.14	+4.01
Liberal Democrats	Greg Cheesman	3,646	3.61	+3.61
United Australia	Nathan Scaglione	3,643	3.61	+1.19
One Nation	John Hayes	2,312	2.29	+2.29
Federation	Sanjeev Sabhlok	968	0.96	+0.96
Total formal votes		101,019	96.79	+0.42
Informal votes		3,355	3.21	−0.42
Turnout		104,374	92.58	−2.65
Two-party-preferred result
Liberal	Keith Wolahan	51,198	50.68	−6.34
Labor	Naomi Oakley	49,821	49.32	+6.34
Liberal hold		Swing	−6.34	

Alluvial diagram for preference flows in the seat of Menzies in the 2022 federal election. indicates at what stage the winning candidate had over 50% of the votes and was declared the winner.

=== Elections in the 2010s ===
==== 2019 ====
2019 Australian federal election: Menzies
Party	Candidate	Votes	%	±%
Liberal	Kevin Andrews	50,863	51.73	+1.89
Labor	Stella Yee	29,539	30.04	+3.12
Greens	Robert Humphreys	10,264	10.44	+0.05
Democratic Labour	Teresa Kelleher	3,026	3.08	+3.08
United Australia	Brett Fuller	2,605	2.65	+2.65
Reason	Rachel Payne	2,029	2.06	+2.06
Total formal votes		98,326	96.68	+1.23
Informal votes		3,376	3.32	−1.23
Turnout		101,702	94.34	−0.91
Two-party-preferred result
Liberal	Kevin Andrews	56,568	57.53	−0.28
Labor	Stella Yee	41,758	42.47	+0.28
Liberal hold		Swing	−0.28	

==== 2016 ====
2016 Australian federal election: Menzies
Party	Candidate	Votes	%	±%
Liberal	Kevin Andrews	45,133	51.72	−7.16
Labor	Adam Rundell	21,468	24.60	−1.06
Greens	Richard Cranston	7,921	9.08	+0.45
Independent	Stephen Mayne	5,863	6.72	+6.72
Family First	David Clark	2,842	3.26	+1.10
Animal Justice	Antony Hulbert	2,327	2.67	+2.67
Voluntary Euthanasia	Jay Franklin	973	1.12	+1.12
Independent	Ramon Robinson	730	0.84	−0.61
Total formal votes		87,257	94.98	−0.72
Informal votes		4,615	5.02	+0.72
Turnout		91,872	92.61	−1.46
Two-party-preferred result
Liberal	Kevin Andrews	52,842	60.56	−3.89
Labor	Adam Rundell	34,415	39.44	+3.89
Liberal hold		Swing	−3.89	

==== 2013 ====
2013 Australian federal election: Menzies
Party	Candidate	Votes	%	±%
Liberal	Kevin Andrews	52,290	58.88	+5.33
Labor	Manoj Kumar	22,788	25.66	−6.52
Greens	Richard Cranston	7,663	8.63	−2.09
Palmer United	Agostino Guardiani	2,353	2.65	+2.65
Family First	Andrew Conlon	1,917	2.16	−1.39
Independent	Ramon Robinson	1,287	1.45	+1.45
Rise Up Australia	Phil Baker	508	0.57	+0.57
Total formal votes		88,806	95.70	−0.20
Informal votes		3,987	4.30	+0.20
Turnout		92,793	94.13	−0.06
Two-party-preferred result
Liberal	Kevin Andrews	57,235	64.45	+5.80
Labor	Manoj Kumar	31,571	35.55	−5.80
Liberal hold		Swing	+5.80	

==== 2010 ====
2010 Australian federal election: Menzies
Party	Candidate	Votes	%	±%
Liberal	Kevin Andrews	43,932	53.63	+2.03
Labor	Joy Banerji	26,287	32.09	−2.69
Greens	Chris Padgham	8,802	10.75	+4.46
Family First	Ken Smithies	2,892	3.53	+1.11
Total formal votes		81,913	95.91	−1.33
Informal votes		3,497	4.09	+1.33
Turnout		85,410	93.89	−2.26
Two-party-preferred result
Liberal	Kevin Andrews	48,102	58.72	+2.70
Labor	Joy Banerji	33,811	41.28	−2.70
Liberal hold		Swing	+2.70	

=== Elections in the 2000s ===
==== 2007 ====
2007 Australian federal election: Menzies
Party	Candidate	Votes	%	±%
Liberal	Kevin Andrews	43,393	51.60	−5.19
Labor	Andrew Campbell	29,249	34.78	+1.99
Greens	David Ellis	5,291	6.29	−0.17
Independent	Philip Nitschke	3,297	3.92	+3.92
Family First	Ken Smithies	2,036	2.42	+0.28
Democrats	Damian Wise	822	0.98	−0.53
Total formal votes		84,088	97.24	+0.85
Informal votes		2,385	2.76	−0.85
Turnout		86,473	96.12	+0.68
Two-party-preferred result
Liberal	Kevin Andrews	47,104	56.02	−4.65
Labor	Andrew Campbell	36,984	43.98	+4.65
Liberal hold		Swing	−4.65	

==== 2004 ====
2004 Australian federal election: Menzies
Party	Candidate	Votes	%	±%
Liberal	Kevin Andrews	46,132	56.79	+3.46
Labor	Brian Jones	26,635	32.79	−0.41
Greens	Matthew Wright	5,251	6.46	+0.97
Family First	John Bridge	1,739	2.14	+2.14
Democrats	Anne Page	1,226	1.51	−5.09
Citizens Electoral Council	Jordon Davidson	256	0.32	+0.32
Total formal votes		81,239	96.39	−0.22
Informal votes		3,039	3.61	+0.22
Turnout		84,278	95.44	−0.37
Two-party-preferred result
Liberal	Kevin Andrews	49,288	60.67	+1.76
Labor	Brian Jones	31,951	39.33	−1.76
Liberal hold		Swing	+1.76	

==== 2001 ====
2001 Australian federal election: Menzies
Party	Candidate	Votes	%	±%
Liberal	Kevin Andrews	41,565	53.28	+6.39
Labor	Olga Vasilopoulos	25,895	33.19	+0.34
Democrats	Michael Ryan	5,113	6.55	+0.74
Greens	Barry Watson	4,301	5.51	+5.51
No GST	Brendan Griffin	1,135	1.45	+1.45
Total formal votes		78,009	96.55	−0.27
Informal votes		2,784	3.45	+0.27
Turnout		80,793	95.78	
Two-party-preferred result
Liberal	Kevin Andrews	45,977	58.94	+3.54
Labor	Olga Vasilopoulos	32,032	41.06	−3.54
Liberal hold		Swing	+3.54	

=== Elections in the 1990s ===
==== 1998 ====
1998 Australian federal election: Menzies
Party	Candidate	Votes	%	±%
Liberal	Kevin Andrews	35,415	46.89	−8.63
Labor	Peter Allan	24,812	32.85	−1.02
Independent	Philip Nitschke	6,843	9.06	+9.06
Democrats	Damian Wise	4,395	5.82	−3.02
One Nation	John Casley	1,383	1.83	+1.83
Unity	Mohamed Morsy	1,383	1.83	+1.83
Independent	Marcia Riordan	1,060	1.40	+1.40
Natural Law	Mark Bunn	240	0.32	−1.46
Total formal votes		75,531	96.82	−0.71
Informal votes		2,480	3.18	+0.71
Turnout		78,011	95.79	−0.85
Two-party-preferred result
Liberal	Kevin Andrews	41,844	55.40	−5.59
Labor	Peter Allan	33,687	44.60	+5.59
Liberal hold		Swing	−5.59	

==== 1996 ====
1996 Australian federal election: Menzies
Party	Candidate	Votes	%	±%
Liberal	Kevin Andrews	41,479	55.52	−2.14
Labor	Peter De Angelis	25,307	33.87	−3.05
Democrats	Angela Carter	6,602	8.84	+4.53
Natural Law	Susan Brown	1,328	1.78	+0.66
Total formal votes		74,716	97.53	+0.27
Informal votes		1,891	2.47	−0.27
Turnout		76,607	96.64	−0.53
Two-party-preferred result
Liberal	Kevin Andrews	45,330	60.99	+1.73
Labor	Peter De Angelis	28,993	39.01	−1.73
Liberal hold		Swing	+1.73	

==== 1993 ====
1993 Australian federal election: Menzies
Party	Candidate	Votes	%	±%
Liberal	Kevin Andrews	40,200	57.37	−1.08
Labor	Peter De Angelis	26,154	37.32	+9.46
Democrats	John Dobinson	2,955	4.22	−7.38
Natural Law	Denis Quinlan	762	1.09	+1.09
Total formal votes		70,071	97.18	+0.24
Informal votes		2,030	2.82	−0.24
Turnout		72,101	97.17	
Two-party-preferred result
Liberal	Kevin Andrews	41,488	59.23	−5.02
Labor	Peter De Angelis	28,553	40.77	+5.02
Liberal hold		Swing	−5.02	

==== 1991 by-election ====
1991 Menzies by-election
Party	Candidate	Votes	%	±%
Liberal	Kevin Andrews	40,154	67.7	+9.3
Democrats	Ken Peak	13,070	22.0	+10.4
AAFI	Denis McCormack	4,055	6.8	+6.8
Independent	Jim Bernard	2,035	3.4	+3.4
Total formal votes		59,314	95.0	
Informal votes		3,103	5.0	
Turnout		62,417	86.1	
Two-party-preferred result
Liberal	Kevin Andrews	42,719	72.0	+7.7
Democrats	Ken Peak	16,578	28.0	+28.0
Liberal hold		Swing	+7.7	

==== 1990 ====
1990 Australian federal election: Menzies
Party	Candidate	Votes	%	±%
Liberal	Neil Brown	38,844	58.4	+3.4
Labor	Ivana Csar	18,521	27.9	−6.9
Democrats	Elizabeth Piper-Johnson	7,710	11.6	+3.0
Call to Australia	Ron Suter	1,384	2.1	+2.1
Total formal votes		66,459	96.9	
Informal votes		2,094	3.1	
Turnout		68,553	96.6	
Two-party-preferred result
Liberal	Neil Brown	42,684	64.3	+5.0
Labor	Ivana Csar	23,742	35.7	−5.0
Liberal hold		Swing	+5.0	

=== Elections in the 1980s ===
==== 1987 ====
1987 Australian federal election: Menzies
Party	Candidate	Votes	%	±%
Liberal	Neil Brown	32,401	53.0	+2.4
Labor	Ivana Csar	22,505	36.8	−4.0
Democrats	Marjorie White	5,266	8.6	+2.3
Unite Australia	Bruce Plain	972	1.6	+1.6
Total formal votes		61,144	95.3	
Informal votes		2,999	4.7	
Turnout		64,143	95.1	
Two-party-preferred result
Liberal	Neil Brown	35,049	57.3	+1.6
Labor	Ivana Csar	26,085	42.7	−1.6
Liberal hold		Swing	+1.6	

==== 1984 ====
1984 Australian federal election: Menzies
Party	Candidate	Votes	%	±%
Liberal	Neil Brown	28,395	50.6	+1.6
Labor	David McKenzie	22,901	40.8	−2.2
Democrats	Lynden Kenyon	3,519	6.3	+0.0
Democratic Labor	Vin Considine	1,306	2.3	+0.9
Total formal votes		56,121	92.7	
Informal votes		4,388	7.3	
Turnout		60,509	96.0	
Two-party-preferred result
Liberal	Neil Brown	31,264	55.7	+2.3
Labor	David McKenzie	24,840	44.3	−2.3
Liberal notional hold		Swing	+2.3	
