= List of electoral divisions in Victoria =

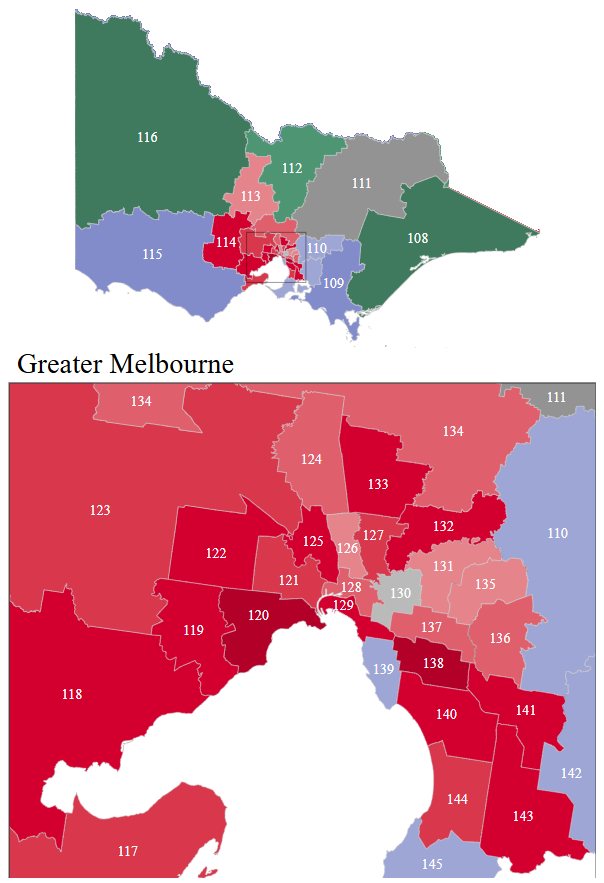
Results of the 2025 federal election

The Australian state of Victoria is divided into 38 electoral divisions for the purposes of electing the Australian House of Representatives. At the 2025 federal election the Australian Labor Party won 27 of the state's 38 divisions, while the Liberals won 6, the Nationals won 3, and two were won by independents.

== Divisions ==
Name	Formed	Size (km^{2})	Classification	Current Member	Member's Party	Reference
Aston	1984	124	Outer-metropolitan	Mary Doyle	Labor	
Ballarat	1901	5,323	Provincial	Catherine King	Labor	
Bendigo	1901	6,178	Provincial	Lisa Chesters	Labor	
Bruce	1955	142	Outer-metropolitan	Julian Hill	Labor	
Calwell	1984	191	Outer-metropolitan	Basem Abdo	Labor	
Casey	1969	2,624	Rural	Aaron Violi	Liberal	
Chisholm	1949	73	Inner-metropolitan	Carina Garland	Labor	
Cooper	2019	61	Inner-metropolitan	Ged Kearney	Labor	
Corangamite	1901	640	Provincial	Libby Coker	Labor	
Corio	1901	1,216	Provincial	Richard Marles	Labor	
Deakin	1937	98	Outer-metropolitan	Matt Gregg	Labor	
Dunkley	1984	148	Outer-metropolitan	Jodie Belyea	Labor	
Flinders	1901	887	Rural	Zoe McKenzie	Liberal	
Fraser	2019	98	Inner-metropolitan	Daniel Mulino	Labor	
Gellibrand	1949	144	Inner-metropolitan	Tim Watts	Labor	
Gippsland	1901	33,131	Rural	Darren Chester	Nationals	
Goldstein	1984	56	Inner-metropolitan	Tim Wilson	Liberal	
Gorton	2004	207	Outer-metropolitan	Alice Jordan-Baird	Labor	
Hawke	2022	1,986	Provincial	Sam Rae	Labor	
Holt	1969	252	Outer-metropolitan	Cassandra Fernando	Labor	
Hotham	1969	81	Inner-metropolitan	Clare O'Neil	Labor	
Indi	1901	29,188	Rural	Helen Haines	Independent	
Isaacs	1969	158	Outer-metropolitan	Mark Dreyfus	Labor	
Jagajaga	1984	137	Outer-metropolitan	Kate Thwaites	Labor	
Kooyong	1901	59	Inner-metropolitan	Monique Ryan	Independent	
La Trobe	1949	1,303	Provincial	Jason Wood	Liberal	
Lalor	1949	180	Outer-metropolitan	Joanne Ryan	Labor	
Macnamara	2019	38	Inner-metropolitan	Josh Burns	Labor	
Mallee	1949	83,412	Rural	Anne Webster	Nationals	
Maribyrnong	1906	70	Inner-metropolitan	Jo Briskey	Labor	
McEwen	1984	2,288	Rural	Rob Mitchell	Labor	
Melbourne	1901	39	Inner-metropolitan	Sarah Witty	Labor	
Menzies	1984	102	Outer-metropolitan	Gabriel Ng	Labor	
Monash	2019	8,255	Rural	Mary Aldred	Liberal	
Nicholls	2019	14,116	Rural	Sam Birrell	Nationals	
Scullin	1968	174	Outer-metropolitan	Andrew Giles	Labor	
Wannon	1901	34,270	Rural	Dan Tehan	Liberal	
Wills	1949	47	Inner-metropolitan	Peter Khalil	Labor	

== See also ==
- Parliament of Victoria
