= Results of the 2025 Australian federal election in Victoria =

Federal election results in Victoria, Australia

2025 Australian federal election (Victoria)
- 3 May 2025

All 38 Victorian seats in the Australian House of Representatives and 6 seats in the Australian Senate
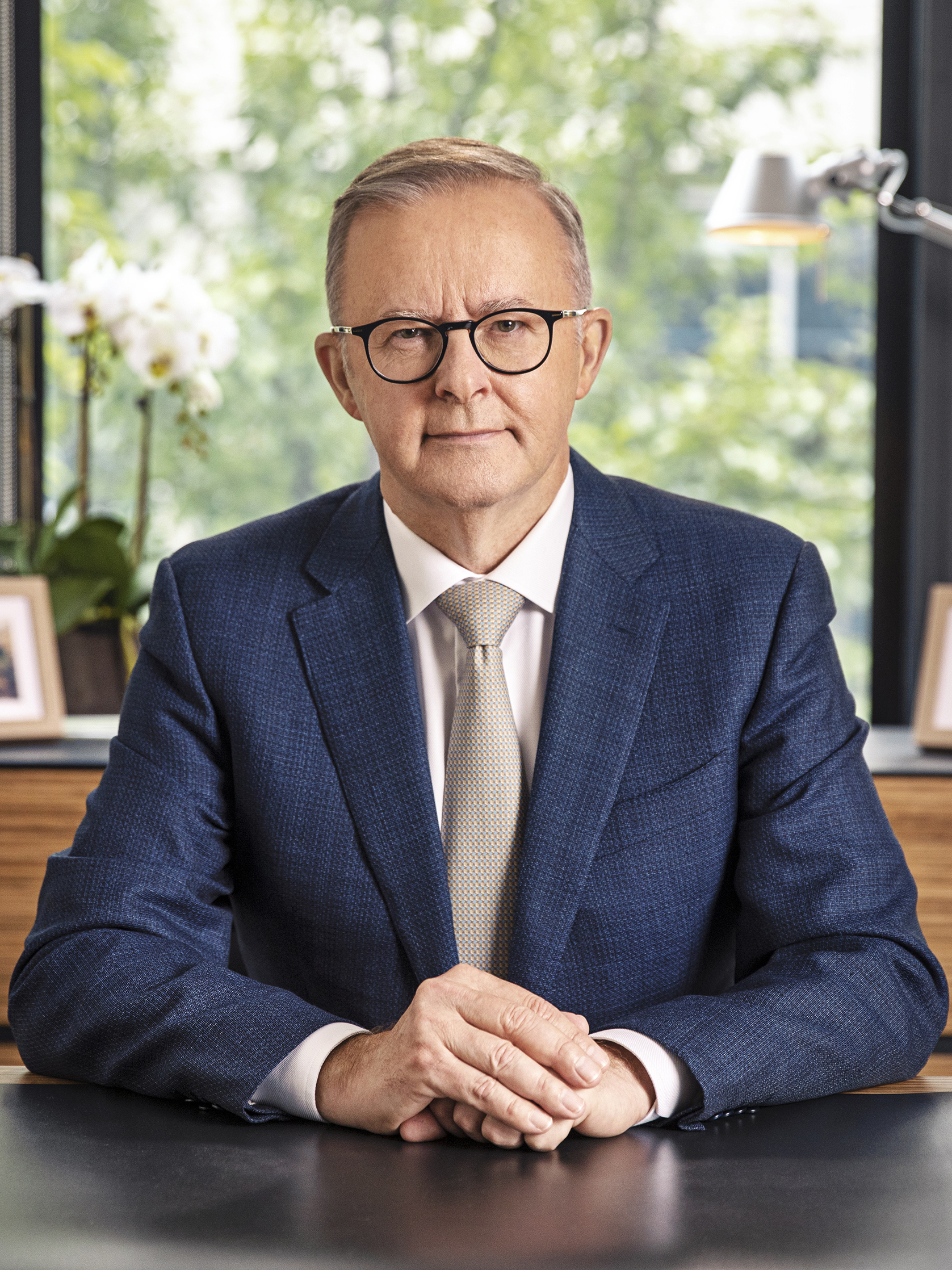

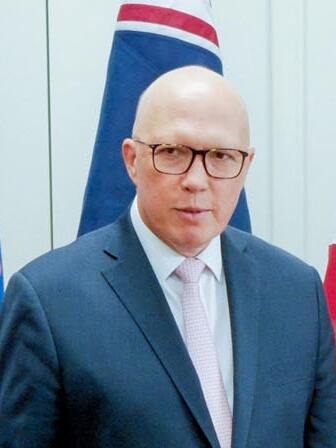

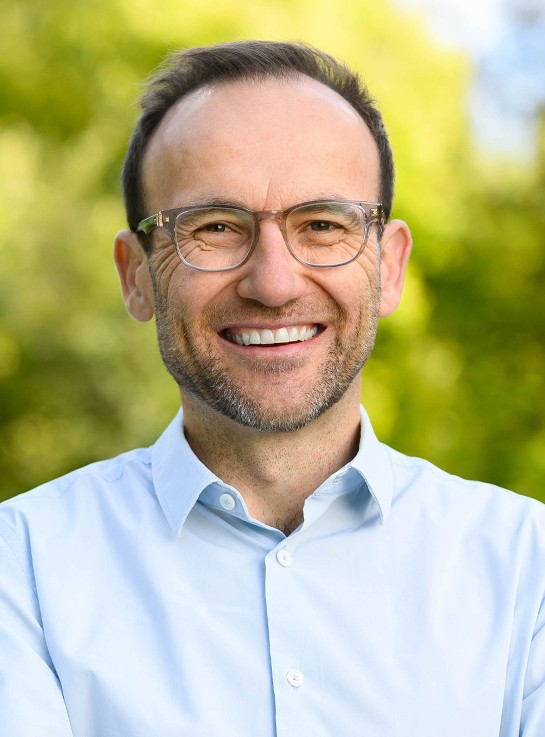
	First party	Second party	Third party
Leader	Anthony Albanese	Peter Dutton	Adam Bandt
Party	Labor	Coalition	Greens
Last election	24 seats	11 seats	1 seat
Seats won	27	9	0
Seat change	▲3	▼2	▼1
Popular vote	1,375,995	1,304,933	550,659
Percentage	33.95%	32.20%	13.59%
Swing	▲1.10	▼0.88	▼0.15
TPP	56.35%	43.65%
TPP swing	▲1.52	▼1.52
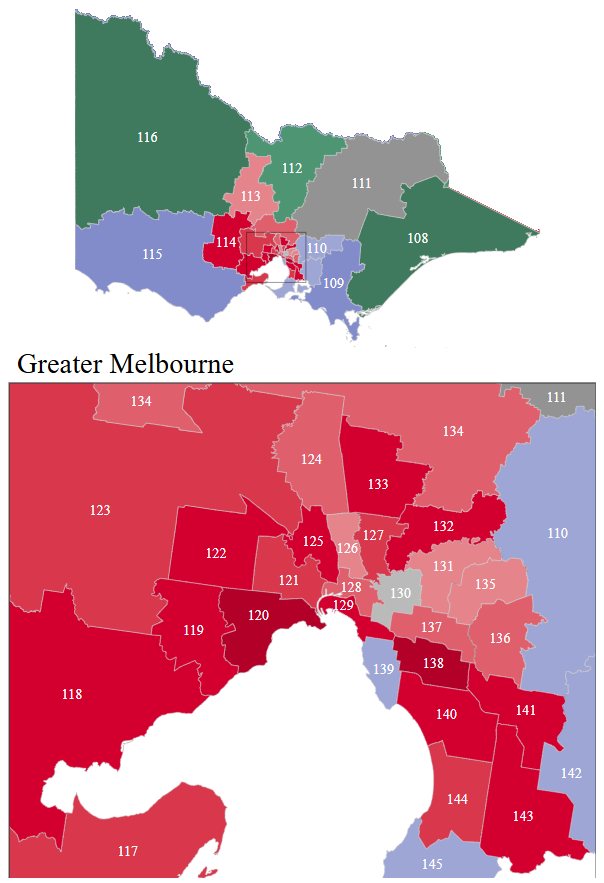

This is a list of electoral division results for the 2025 Australian federal election in the state of Victoria.

== Overall results ==
House of Representatives (IRV) – Turnout 92.44% (CV)
Party	Votes	%	Swing (pp)	Seats	Change (seats)
Labor	1,375,995	33.95	+1.10	27	▲3
Liberal–National Coalition	1,304,936	32.20	−0.88	9	▼2
Liberal	1,117,878	27.58	−1.93	6	▼2
Nationals	187,058	4.62	+1.05	3	Steady
Greens	550,659	13.59	−0.15	0	▼1
One Nation	234,482	5.79	+1.96	0	Steady
Family First	89,584	2.21	+2.21	0	Steady
Legalise Cannabis	56,114	1.38	+1.38	0	Steady
Trumpet of Patriots	50,471	1.25	+0.70	0	Steady
Libertarian	24,744	0.61	−1.92	0	Steady
Victorian Socialists	23,652	0.58	−0.15	0	Steady
Socialist Alliance	12,017	0.30	+0.15	0	Steady
Citizens	7,343	0.18	+0.13	0	Steady
Animal Justice	6,548	0.16	−0.59	0	Steady
People First	5,979	0.15	+0.15	0	Steady
Fusion	4,869	0.12	+0.06	0	Steady
Independent	305,184	7.53	+1.02	2	▼1
Not affiliated	487	0.01	+0.01	0	Steady
Total	4,053,064	100.00	–	38	▼1
Invalid/blank votes	179,441	4.24	−0.47	–	–
Turnout	4,232,505	92.44	+1.85	–	–
Registered voters	4,578,453	–	–	–	–
Two-party-preferred vote
Labor	2,283,824	56.35	+1.52		
Liberal–National Coalition	1,769,240	43.65	−1.52		
Source: AEC

== Results by division ==
=== Aston ===
2025 Australian federal election: Aston
Party	Candidate	Votes	%	±%
Liberal	Manny Cicchiello	41,382	37.67	−5.15
Labor	Mary Doyle	40,926	37.26	+4.75
Greens	Reuben Steen	12,669	11.53	−0.69
One Nation	John De Wacht	3,738	3.40	+0.34
Family First	Craig Manners	3,006	2.74	+2.74
Trumpet of Patriots	Steve Desveaux	2,526	2.30	+2.22
Independent	Mark Grondman	2,439	2.22	+2.22
Independent	Andrew Williams	2,104	1.92	+1.92
Libertarian	David Fawcett	1,059	0.96	−1.19
Total formal votes		109,849	94.97	−1.61
Informal votes		5,814	5.03	+1.61
Turnout		115,663	94.45	+1.90
Two-party-preferred result
Labor	Mary Doyle	58,690	53.43	+6.04
Liberal	Manny Cicchiello	51,159	46.57	−6.04
Labor gain from Liberal		Swing	+6.04	

Alluvial diagram illustrating the full distribution of preferences in the seat of Aston for the 2025 Federal Election

=== Ballarat ===
2025 Australian federal election: Ballarat
Party	Candidate	Votes	%	±%
Labor	Catherine King	44,273	42.35	−2.40
Liberal	Paula Doran	29,883	28.59	+1.50
Greens	John Barnes	14,984	14.33	−0.26
One Nation	Terri Pryse-Smith	8,029	7.68	+4.08
Family First	Ian Harkness	3,057	2.92	+2.92
Independent	Luke Parker	2,934	2.81	+2.81
Libertarian	Ryan Redfern	1,380	1.32	−2.01
Total formal votes		104,540	96.35	+1.38
Informal votes		3,955	3.65	−1.38
Turnout		108,495	93.34	+3.61
Two-party-preferred result
Labor	Catherine King	63,419	60.66	−2.32
Liberal	Paula Doran	41,121	39.34	+2.32
Labor hold		Swing	−2.32	

Alluvial diagram illustrating the full distribution of preferences in the seat of Ballarat for the 2025 Federal Election

=== Bendigo ===
2025 Australian federal election: Bendigo
Party	Candidate	Votes	%	±%
Labor	Lisa Chesters	35,771	33.55	−8.56
National	Andrew Lethlean	31,707	29.74	+28.84
Greens	Avery Barnett-Dacey	12,079	11.33	−2.42
Liberal	Matt Evans	11,176	10.48	−15.90
One Nation	Heather Freeman	5,262	4.94	−0.61
Legalise Cannabis	Wayne Taylor	3,666	3.44	+3.44
Family First	Evelyn Keetelaar	3,153	2.96	+2.96
Victorian Socialists	Rohan Tyler	1,708	1.60	+1.60
Independent	David Vincent	1,121	1.05	+1.05
Libertarian	Matt Bansemer	974	0.91	−2.02
Total formal votes		106,617	94.48	−1.74
Informal votes		6,228	5.52	+1.74
Turnout		112,845	93.97	+2.52
Two-party-preferred result
Labor	Lisa Chesters	54,800	51.40	−9.81
National	Andrew Lethlean	51,817	48.60	+48.60
Labor hold				

=== Bruce ===
2025 Australian federal election: Bruce
Party	Candidate	Votes	%	±%
Labor	Julian Hill	49,610	45.31	+5.05
Liberal	Zahid Safi	25,162	22.98	−8.70
Greens	Rhonda Garad	13,213	12.07	+2.36
One Nation	Bianca Colecchia	8,931	8.16	+3.47
Family First	Wendy Birchall	4,196	3.83	+3.83
Legalise Cannabis	Andrew Louth	3,563	3.25	+3.25
Trumpet of Patriots	Samuel Anderson	3,530	3.22	+3.13
Libertarian	Christine Skrobo	1,289	1.18	−3.55
Total formal votes		109,494	93.86	−1.75
Informal votes		7,165	6.14	+1.75
Turnout		116,659	91.41	+3.69
Two-party-preferred result
Labor	Julian Hill	70,751	64.62	+9.31
Liberal	Zahid Safi	38,743	35.38	−9.31
Labor hold		Swing	+9.31	

=== Calwell ===
2025 Australian federal election: Calwell
Party	Candidate	Votes	%	±%
Labor	Basem Abdo	27,423	30.53	−14.33
Liberal	Usman Ghani	14,102	15.70	−8.01
Independent	Carly Moore	10,735	11.95	+11.95
Independent	Joseph Youhana	9,628	10.72	+10.72
Greens	Ravneet Kaur Garcha	7,439	8.28	−1.47
Independent	Samim Moslih	6,155	6.85	+6.85
One Nation	Luay Toma	3,375	3.76	−3.24
Legalise Cannabis	Gianni Del Rosario-Makridis	2,843	3.16	+3.16
Citizens	Bassima Hawli	2,624	2.92	+2.92
Family First	Maria Bengtsson	2,308	2.57	+2.57
Trumpet of Patriots	Assaad Issa	2,211	2.46	+0.68
Independent	Ravi Ragupathy	501	0.56	+0.56
	Morgan Peach	487	0.54	+0.54
Total formal votes		89,831	89.39	−4.32
Informal votes		10,657	10.61	+4.32
Turnout		100,488	86.97	+9.97
Notional two-party-preferred count
Labor	Basem Abdo	58,127	64.71	+2.32
Liberal	Usman Ghani	31,704	35.29	−2.32
Two-candidate-preferred result
Labor	Basem Abdo	49,481	55.08	−7.31
Independent	Carly Moore	40,350	44.92	+44.92
Labor hold				

=== Casey ===
2025 Australian federal election: Casey
Party	Candidate	Votes	%	±%
Liberal	Aaron Violi	45,194	40.88	+4.30
Labor	Naomi Oakley	26,820	24.26	−0.79
Greens	Merran Blair	12,107	10.95	−2.18
Independent	Claire Ferres Miles	11,590	10.48	+2.43
One Nation	Ambere Livori	5,603	5.07	+1.80
Trumpet of Patriots	Phillip Courtis	3,716	3.36	+2.65
Family First	Dan Nebauer	3,154	2.85	+2.85
Animal Justice	Chloe Bond	2,379	2.15	+0.36
Total formal votes		110,563	95.60	+1.75
Informal votes		5,089	4.40	−1.75
Turnout		115,652	94.52	+2.44
Two-party-preferred result
Liberal	Aaron Violi	58,479	52.89	+1.46
Labor	Naomi Oakley	52,084	47.11	−1.46
Liberal hold		Swing	+1.46	

=== Chisholm ===
2025 Australian federal election: Chisholm
Party	Candidate	Votes	%	±%
Labor	Carina Garland	43,655	38.74	+3.98
Liberal	Katie Allen	41,966	37.24	−1.96
Greens	Tim Randall	14,086	12.50	−1.56
Independent	Kath Davies	6,685	5.93	+5.93
Family First	Gary Ong	2,419	2.15	+2.15
One Nation	Guy Livori	2,156	1.91	+0.95
Trumpet of Patriots	Christine McShane	1,729	1.53	+1.01
Total formal votes		112,696	97.62	+1.61
Informal votes		2,747	2.38	−1.61
Turnout		115,443	94.06	+1.38
Two-party-preferred result
Labor	Carina Garland	62,773	55.70	+2.37
Liberal	Katie Allen	49,923	44.30	−2.37
Labor hold		Swing	+2.37	

=== Cooper ===
2025 Australian federal election: Cooper
Party	Candidate	Votes	%	±%
Labor	Ged Kearney	45,151	41.97	+1.28
Greens	Tara Burnett	27,123	25.21	−3.20
Liberal	Stewart Todhunter	16,280	15.13	−1.09
Victorian Socialists	Kath Larkin	9,012	8.38	+4.92
One Nation	William Turner	5,684	5.28	+2.38
Legalise Cannabis	Donna Stolzenberg	4,336	4.03	+4.03
Total formal votes		107,586	97.09	+1.28
Informal votes		3,227	2.91	−1.28
Turnout		110,813	92.41	+4.57
Notional two-party-preferred count
Labor	Ged Kearney	84,489	78.53	+2.82
Liberal	Stewart Todhunter	23,097	21.47	−2.82
Two-candidate-preferred result
Labor	Ged Kearney	64,246	59.72	+0.80
Greens	Tara Burnett	43,340	40.28	−0.80
Labor hold		Swing	+0.80	

=== Corangamite ===
2025 Australian federal election: Corangamite
Party	Candidate	Votes	%	±%
Labor	Libby Coker	38,814	37.31	−1.09
Liberal	Darcy Dunstan	35,488	34.12	+0.10
Greens	Mitch Pope	14,925	14.35	−0.98
Independent	Kate Lockhart	4,565	4.39	+4.39
One Nation	Colin Seabrook	3,343	3.21	+0.77
Legalise Cannabis	Harley Mackenzie	3,161	3.04	+3.04
Trumpet of Patriots	James Jackson	2,452	2.36	+1.51
Libertarian	Paul Barker	1,272	1.22	−1.23
Total formal votes		104,020	96.28	+0.14
Informal votes		4,023	3.72	−0.14
Turnout		108,043	94.67	+6.61
Two-party-preferred result
Labor	Libby Coker	60,381	58.05	+0.21
Liberal	Darcy Dunstan	43,639	41.95	−0.21
Labor hold		Swing	+0.21	

=== Corio ===
2025 Australian federal election: Corio
Party	Candidate	Votes	%	±%
Labor	Richard Marles	47,221	42.84	+0.94
Liberal	Darren Buller	27,423	24.88	−0.14
Greens	Emilie Flynn	17,491	15.87	+1.09
One Nation	Adam Helman	10,953	9.94	+6.02
Independent	John De Lorenzo	3,930	3.57	+3.57
Socialist Alliance	Sarah Hathway	3,209	2.91	+0.52
Total formal votes		110,227	96.84	+2.04
Informal votes		3,593	3.16	−2.04
Turnout		113,820	92.72	+2.59
Two-party-preferred result
Labor	Richard Marles	69,698	63.23	+0.74
Liberal	Darren Buller	40,529	36.77	−0.74
Labor hold		Swing	+0.74	

=== Deakin ===
2025 Australian federal election: Deakin
Party	Candidate	Votes	%	±%
Liberal	Michael Sukkar	44,732	38.73	−2.77
Labor	Matt Gregg	40,177	34.78	+1.87
Greens	Amy Mills	13,758	11.91	−2.29
Independent	Jess Ness	8,253	7.15	+7.15
One Nation	Anne Cooke	3,043	2.63	+0.39
Family First	Richard Griffith-Jones	2,106	1.82	+1.82
Trumpet of Patriots	Milton Wilde	1,853	1.60	+0.69
Libertarian	Will Vandermeer	1,585	1.37	−0.71
Total formal votes		115,507	96.10	+0.08
Informal votes		4,692	3.90	−0.08
Turnout		120,199	94.89	+2.43
Two-party-preferred result
Labor	Matt Gregg	61,014	52.82	+2.84
Liberal	Michael Sukkar	54,493	47.18	−2.84
Labor gain from Liberal		Swing	+2.84	

=== Dunkley ===
2025 Australian federal election: Dunkley
Party	Candidate	Votes	%	±%
Labor	Jodie Belyea	41,792	38.28	−2.17
Liberal	Nathan Conroy	35,288	32.32	+0.57
Greens	Matt Maber	12,649	11.59	+0.97
One Nation	Jessica Davis	7,494	6.86	+3.87
Legalise Cannabis	Lisa Abbott	5,243	4.80	+4.80
Independent	Robert Thurley	3,230	2.96	+2.96
Family First	Peter Nicholes	2,497	2.29	+2.29
Fusion	Andrew Gatley	981	0.90	+0.90
Total formal votes		109,174	95.15	−0.20
Informal votes		5,559	4.85	+0.20
Turnout		114,733	92.27	+3.34
Two-party-preferred result
Labor	Jodie Belyea	62,314	57.08	+0.31
Liberal	Nathan Conroy	46,860	42.92	−0.31
Labor hold		Swing	+0.31	

=== Flinders ===
2025 Australian federal election: Flinders
Party	Candidate	Votes	%	±%
Liberal	Zoe McKenzie	47,375	41.22	−2.07
Labor	Sarah Race	25,622	22.29	−0.56
Independent	Ben Smith	24,406	21.24	+21.24
Greens	Adam Frogley	7,305	6.36	−3.15
One Nation	Mike Brown	6,091	5.30	+2.01
Trumpet of Patriots	Jason Smart (withdrew)	3,144	2.74	+2.25
Independent	Joseph Toscano	980	0.85	+0.85
Total formal votes		114,923	96.44	+1.75
Informal votes		4,246	3.56	−1.75
Turnout		119,169	93.44	+1.65
Notional two-party-preferred count
Liberal	Zoe McKenzie	62,957	54.78	−1.38
Labor	Sarah Race	51,966	45.22	+1.38
Two-candidate-preferred result
Liberal	Zoe McKenzie	60,090	52.29	−3.88
Independent	Ben Smith	54,833	47.71	+47.71
Liberal hold				

=== Fraser ===
2025 Australian federal election: Fraser
Party	Candidate	Votes	%	±%
Labor	Daniel Mulino	45,786	42.60	+0.50
Greens	Huong Truong	27,171	25.28	+6.42
Liberal	Satish Patel	18,125	16.87	−7.64
Victorian Socialists	Jasmine Duff	6,705	6.24	+1.61
One Nation	George Rozario	5,135	4.78	+1.88
Family First	Rob Rancie	4,545	4.23	+4.23
Total formal votes		107,467	96.20	+0.65
Informal votes		4,250	3.80	−0.65
Turnout		111,717	89.96	+4.30
Notional two-party-preferred count
Labor	Daniel Mulino	77,401	72.02	+5.46
Liberal	Satish Patel	30,066	27.98	−5.46
Two-candidate-preferred result
Labor	Daniel Mulino	63,649	59.23	−7.34
Greens	Huong Truong	43,818	40.77	+40.77
Labor hold				

=== Gellibrand ===
2025 Australian federal election: Gellibrand
Party	Candidate	Votes	%	±%
Labor	Tim Watts	49,044	46.62	+3.81
Liberal	Ben Reeson	27,539	26.18	−1.03
Greens	Ponraj Krishna Pandi	17,933	17.05	+1.47
One Nation	Stephen Bennett	6,290	5.98	+2.87
Family First	Jo Garcia	4,396	4.18	+4.18
Total formal votes		105,202	96.75	+1.72
Informal votes		3,538	3.25	−1.72
Turnout		108,740	91.41	+7.81
Two-party-preferred result
Labor	Tim Watts	68,489	65.10	+3.90
Liberal	Ben Reeson	36,713	34.90	−3.90
Labor hold		Swing	+3.90	

=== Gippsland ===
2025 Australian federal election: Gippsland
Party	Candidate	Votes	%	±%
National	Darren Chester	55,036	52.54	−1.60
Labor	Sonny Stephens	22,291	21.28	+2.05
One Nation	Gregory Hansford	15,118	14.43	+5.07
Greens	Rochelle Hine	8,897	8.49	+0.02
Libertarian	Simon Wilson	3,416	3.26	−0.99
Total formal votes		104,758	96.41	−0.63
Informal votes		3,904	3.59	+0.63
Turnout		108,662	92.03	+3.67
Two-party-preferred result
National	Darren Chester	72,656	69.36	−1.21
Labor	Sonny Stephens	32,102	30.64	+1.21
National hold		Swing	−1.21	

=== Goldstein ===
2025 Australian federal election: Goldstein
Party	Candidate	Votes	%	±%
Liberal	Tim Wilson	50,228	43.42	+3.85
Independent	Zoe Daniel	35,533	30.72	−0.57
Labor	Nildhara Gadani	15,812	13.67	+0.07
Greens	Alana Galli-McRostie	8,320	7.19	−1.23
Trumpet of Patriots	Vicki Williams	2,066	1.79	+1.79
One Nation	Leon Gardiner	2,037	1.76	+0.31
Libertarian	David Segal	1,677	1.45	−0.96
Total formal votes		115,673	97.31	+0.74
Informal votes		3,198	2.69	−0.74
Turnout		118,871	94.24	+2.87
Notional two-party-preferred count
Liberal	Tim Wilson	62,427	53.97	+0.25
Labor	Nildhara Gadani	53,246	46.03	−0.25
Two-candidate-preferred result
Liberal	Tim Wilson	57,924	50.08	+1.88
Independent	Zoe Daniel	57,749	49.92	−1.88
Liberal gain from Independent		Swing	+1.88	

=== Gorton ===
2025 Australian federal election: Gorton
Party	Candidate	Votes	%	±%
Labor	Alice Jordan-Baird	48,834	43.05	+1.74
Liberal	John Fletcher	33,087	29.17	+1.75
Greens	Thuc Bao Huynh	12,244	10.79	+1.78
One Nation	Alan Reid	7,137	6.29	−0.98
Legalise Cannabis	Xavier Menta	6,535	5.76	+5.76
Family First	Kathrine Ashton	4,216	3.72	+3.72
Libertarian	Rob McCathie	1,377	1.21	+1.21
Total formal votes		113,430	95.61	+2.73
Informal votes		5,210	4.39	−2.73
Turnout		118,640	91.81	+11.46
Two-party-preferred result
Labor	Alice Jordan-Baird	68,380	60.28	+0.30
Liberal	John Fletcher	45,050	39.72	−0.30
Labor hold		Swing	+0.30	

=== Hawke ===
2025 Australian federal election: Hawke
Party	Candidate	Votes	%	±%
Labor	Sam Rae	40,619	39.13	+2.40
Liberal	Simmone Cottom	31,383	30.23	+3.88
Greens	Sarah Newman	10,178	9.80	+0.87
One Nation	Matthew Katselis	10,035	9.67	+4.08
Legalise Cannabis	Devon Starbuck	5,177	4.99	+4.99
Family First	Melanie Milutinovic	4,356	4.20	+4.20
Animal Justice	Fiona Adin-James	2,069	1.99	+1.99
Total formal votes		103,817	95.91	+4.05
Informal votes		4,431	4.09	−4.05
Turnout		108,248	91.13	+7.84
Two-party-preferred result
Labor	Sam Rae	59,830	57.63	+0.01
Liberal	Simmone Cottom	43,987	42.37	−0.01
Labor hold		Swing	+0.01	

=== Holt ===
2025 Australian federal election: Holt
Party	Candidate	Votes	%	±%
Labor	Cassandra Fernando	44,686	45.03	+4.22
Liberal	Annette Samuel	24,840	25.03	−4.51
Greens	Payal Tiwari	11,122	11.21	+2.66
One Nation	Trevor Hammond	8,655	8.72	+3.85
Family First	Shane Foreman	5,185	5.23	+5.23
Legalise Cannabis	Riley Aickin	4,745	4.78	+4.78
Total formal votes		99,233	96.20	+2.76
Informal votes		3,923	3.80	−2.76
Turnout		103,156	91.33	+9.49
Two-party-preferred result
Labor	Cassandra Fernando	63,538	64.03	+6.92
Liberal	Annette Samuel	35,695	35.97	−6.92
Labor hold		Swing	+6.92	

=== Hotham ===
2025 Australian federal election: Hotham
Party	Candidate	Votes	%	±%
Labor	Clare O'Neil	51,880	48.85	+5.74
Liberal	Harmick Singh Matharu	27,346	25.75	−2.81
Greens	Martin Barry	15,780	14.86	+0.21
One Nation	Stuart Fogarty	4,959	4.67	+2.29
Family First	Mark Brown	3,592	3.38	+3.38
Citizens	Tony Vainoras	2,654	2.50	+2.46
Total formal votes		106,211	96.64	+0.19
Informal votes		3,692	3.36	−0.19
Turnout		109,903	92.36	+2.59
Two-party-preferred result
Labor	Clare O'Neil	71,012	66.86	+5.27
Liberal	Harmick Singh Matharu	35,199	33.14	−5.27
Labor hold		Swing	+5.27	

=== Indi ===
2025 Australian federal election: Indi
Party	Candidate	Votes	%	±%
Independent	Helen Haines	44,723	42.29	+1.61
Liberal	James Trenery	32,475	30.71	+0.19
Labor	Mitch Bridges	8,824	8.34	−0.25
One Nation	Athol Thomas	7,611	7.20	+1.92
Greens	Alysia Regan	3,839	3.63	+0.06
Legalise Cannabis	Ben Howman	3,163	2.99	+2.99
Family First	Michael White	1,901	1.80	+1.80
Libertarian	Tim Quilty	1,705	1.61	−0.65
Independent	Mark McFarlane	1,520	1.44	+1.44
Total formal votes		105,761	94.40	−0.13
Informal votes		6,279	5.60	+0.13
Turnout		112,040	92.77	+3.79
Notional two-party-preferred count
Liberal	James Trenery	59,925	56.66	+1.40
Labor	Mitch Bridges	45,836	43.34	−1.40
Two-candidate-preferred result
Independent	Helen Haines	62,014	58.64	−0.30
Liberal	James Trenery	43,747	41.36	+0.30
Independent hold		Swing	−0.30	

=== Isaacs ===
2025 Australian federal election: Isaacs
Party	Candidate	Votes	%	±%
Labor	Mark Dreyfus	53,454	49.41	+6.63
Liberal	Fiona Ottey	30,660	28.34	−1.20
Greens	Matthew Kirwan	15,200	14.05	+1.98
One Nation	Geoff McMahon	4,989	4.61	+1.59
Family First	Audrey Harmse	3,878	3.58	+3.58
Total formal votes		108,181	96.47	−0.05
Informal votes		3,958	3.53	+0.05
Turnout		112,139	92.87	+3.76
Two-party-preferred result
Labor	Mark Dreyfus	69,604	64.34	+4.83
Liberal	Fiona Ottey	38,577	35.66	−4.83
Labor hold		Swing	+4.83	

=== Jagajaga ===
2025 Australian federal election: Jagajaga
Party	Candidate	Votes	%	±%
Labor	Kate Thwaites	47,284	42.56	+1.81
Liberal	Chris Parr	32,724	29.45	+0.21
Greens	Jy Sandford	17,334	15.60	−1.09
Independent	Chris Kearney	5,167	4.65	+4.65
One Nation	Leslie Ralph	4,297	3.87	+1.56
Family First	Rae Rancie	2,775	2.50	+2.50
Independent	Abdi Mohamed	1,518	1.37	+1.37
Total formal votes		111,099	97.13	+0.93
Informal votes		3,288	2.87	−0.93
Turnout		114,387	94.33	+2.20
Two-party-preferred result
Labor	Kate Thwaites	69,858	62.88	+0.67
Liberal	Chris Parr	41,241	37.12	−0.67
Labor hold		Swing	+0.67	

=== Kooyong ===
2025 Australian federal election: Kooyong
Party	Candidate	Votes	%	±%
Liberal	Amelia Hamer	49,542	43.13	−0.27
Independent	Monique Ryan	38,955	33.91	+3.13
Labor	Clive Crosby	13,671	11.90	+0.57
Greens	Jackie Carter	8,900	7.75	−2.10
Libertarian	Richard Peppard	1,475	1.28	−0.13
One Nation	Camille Brache	1,201	1.05	+0.52
Trumpet of Patriots	David Vader	1,124	0.98	+0.87
Total formal votes		114,868	97.95	+0.78
Informal votes		2,402	2.05	−0.78
Turnout		117,270	94.21	+0.85
Notional two-party-preferred count
Liberal	Amelia Hamer	60,159	52.37	−1.37
Labor	Clive Crosby	54,709	47.63	+1.37
Two-candidate-preferred result
Independent	Monique Ryan	58,200	50.67	−1.85
Liberal	Amelia Hamer	56,668	49.33	+1.85
Independent hold		Swing	−1.85	

=== La Trobe ===
2025 Australian federal election: La Trobe
Party	Candidate	Votes	%	±%
Liberal	Jason Wood	40,547	39.13	−6.05
Labor	Jeff Springfield	33,289	32.13	+5.90
Greens	Jamie Longmuir	13,386	12.92	+2.00
One Nation	Leo Panetta	7,956	7.68	+2.63
Trumpet of Patriots	Gregory Hardiman	4,727	4.56	+3.58
Family First	Ron Malhotra	3,713	3.58	+3.58
Total formal votes		103,618	96.56	+1.29
Informal votes		3,689	3.44	−1.29
Turnout		107,307	92.97	+12.23
Two-party-preferred result
Liberal	Jason Wood	53,944	52.06	−6.37
Labor	Jeff Springfield	49,674	47.94	+6.37
Liberal hold		Swing	−6.37	

=== Lalor ===
2025 Australian federal election: Lalor
Party	Candidate	Votes	%	±%
Labor	Joanne Ryan	43,284	43.60	−0.53
Liberal	Mira D'Silva	25,869	26.06	+1.14
Greens	Owen Parris	15,181	15.29	+4.94
One Nation	Jason Oosthuizen	6,986	7.04	+3.06
Family First	Matthew Emerson	4,578	4.61	+4.61
Independent	Aijaz Moinuddin	2,101	2.12	−0.67
Libertarian	Patrizia Barcatta	1,285	1.29	−2.57
Total formal votes		99,284	96.02	+2.13
Informal votes		4,120	3.98	−2.13
Turnout		103,404	90.31	+11.87
Two-party-preferred result
Labor	Joanne Ryan	62,761	63.21	+0.42
Liberal	Mira D'Silva	36,523	36.79	−0.42
Labor hold		Swing	+0.42	

=== Macnamara ===
2025 Australian federal election: Macnamara
Party	Candidate	Votes	%	±%
Labor	Josh Burns	36,228	36.11	+4.45
Liberal	Benson Saulo	32,606	32.50	+3.38
Greens	Sonya Semmens	25,561	25.47	−4.19
One Nation	Sean Rubin	2,803	2.79	+1.40
Independent	JB Myers	1,841	1.83	−0.06
Libertarian	Michael Abelman	1,299	1.29	−0.83
Total formal votes		100,338	97.81	+1.23
Informal votes		2,246	2.19	−1.23
Turnout		102,584	89.53	+3.12
Two-party-preferred result
Labor	Josh Burns	62,004	61.80	−0.37
Liberal	Benson Saulo	38,334	38.20	+0.37
Labor hold		Swing	−0.37	

=== Mallee ===
2025 Australian federal election: Mallee
Party	Candidate	Votes	%	±%
National	Anne Webster	51,553	49.71	+0.62
Labor	Greg Olsen	19,839	19.13	+2.37
One Nation	Vaughan Williams	11,414	11.01	+4.26
Greens	Nicole Rowan	9,477	9.14	+3.80
Family First	Ashleigh Gray	3,960	3.82	+3.82
Trumpet of Patriots	Adam Veitch	3,810	3.67	+3.67
Libertarian	Jeff Barry	2,671	2.58	+2.58
Citizens	Chris Lahy	983	0.95	+0.15
Total formal votes		103,707	93.22	−1.14
Informal votes		7,540	6.78	+1.14
Turnout		111,247	91.48	+3.82
Two-party-preferred result
National	Anne Webster	71,597	69.04	+0.05
Labor	Greg Olsen	32,110	30.96	−0.05
National hold		Swing	+0.05	

=== Maribyrnong ===
2025 Australian federal election: Maribyrnong
Party	Candidate	Votes	%	±%
Labor	Jo Briskey	46,064	41.43	−0.76
Liberal	Tim Beddoe	33,874	30.46	+3.71
Greens	James Williams	23,594	21.22	+4.51
One Nation	Alannah Casey	7,665	6.89	+4.45
Total formal votes		111,197	97.29	+2.30
Informal votes		3,098	2.71	−2.30
Turnout		114,295	92.74	+3.97
Two-party-preferred result
Labor	Jo Briskey	69,660	62.65	−0.38
Liberal	Tim Beddoe	41,537	37.35	+0.38
Labor hold		Swing	−0.38	

=== McEwen ===
2025 Australian federal election: McEwen
Party	Candidate	Votes	%	±%
Labor	Rob Mitchell	39,079	37.35	+0.13
Liberal	Jason McClintock	34,023	32.52	−0.24
Greens	Marley McRae McLeod	11,611	11.10	−2.95
One Nation	Jeremy Johnson	6,869	6.57	+0.99
Legalise Cannabis	Tom Forrest	4,057	3.88	+3.88
People First	Ali Antoniou	3,538	3.38	+3.38
Family First	Julio Valencia	2,499	2.39	+2.39
Animal Justice	Chloe Nicolosi	2,100	2.01	+2.01
Fusion	Erin McGrath	840	0.80	+0.80
Total formal votes		104,616	94.84	−1.18
Informal votes		5,691	5.16	+1.18
Turnout		110,307	93.54	+9.11
Two-party-preferred result
Labor	Rob Mitchell	57,288	54.76	+0.94
Liberal	Jason McClintock	47,328	45.24	−0.94
Labor hold		Swing	+0.94	

=== Melbourne ===
2025 Australian federal election: Melbourne
Party	Candidate	Votes	%	±%
Greens	Adam Bandt	38,457	39.46	−5.27
Labor	Sarah Witty	30,541	31.34	+5.68
Liberal	Steph Hunt	19,267	19.77	+0.24
Independent	Anthony Koutoufides	3,204	3.29	+3.29
One Nation	Melanie Casey	2,438	2.50	+1.66
Fusion	Helen Huang	1,926	1.98	+1.98
Independent	Tim Smith	1,615	1.66	+1.66
Total formal votes		97,448	97.57	+0.59
Informal votes		2,427	2.43	−0.59
Turnout		99,875	88.10	+0.05
Notional two-party-preferred count
Labor	Sarah Witty	72,083	73.97	+0.88
Liberal	Steph Hunt	25,365	26.03	−0.88
Two-candidate-preferred result
Labor	Sarah Witty	51,663	53.02	+8.60
Greens	Adam Bandt	45,785	46.98	−8.60
Labor gain from Greens		Swing	+8.60	

=== Menzies ===
2025 Australian federal election: Menzies
Party	Candidate	Votes	%	±%
Liberal	Keith Wolahan	44,473	40.64	−0.30
Labor	Gabriel Ng	38,012	34.74	+2.94
Greens	Bill Pheasant	11,998	10.96	−1.94
Independent	Stella Yee	6,966	6.37	+6.37
Trumpet of Patriots	Amanda Paliouras	2,708	2.47	+1.67
One Nation	Jhett Edwards-Scott	2,152	1.97	+0.01
Family First	Ann Seeley	1,759	1.61	+1.61
Libertarian	Joshua Utoyo	1,362	1.24	−1.81
Total formal votes		109,430	96.03	−0.54
Informal votes		4,523	3.97	+0.54
Turnout		113,953	94.18	+0.45
Two-party-preferred result
Labor	Gabriel Ng	55,894	51.08	+0.66
Liberal	Keith Wolahan	53,536	48.92	−0.66
Labor notional hold		Swing	+0.66	

=== Monash ===
2025 Australian federal election: Monash
Party	Candidate	Votes	%	±%
Liberal	Mary Aldred	32,579	31.78	−6.01
Labor	Tully Fletcher	20,804	20.29	−5.31
Independent	Deb Leonard	17,529	17.10	+6.38
Independent	Russell Broadbent	10,450	10.19	+10.19
One Nation	Kuljeet Kaur Robinson	8,166	7.97	+0.43
Greens	Terence Steele	5,062	4.94	−4.92
Legalise Cannabis	David O'Reilly	3,521	3.43	+3.43
Trumpet of Patriots	Alex Wehbe	2,608	2.54	+1.84
Family First	Geoff Dethlefs	1,801	1.76	+1.76
Total formal votes		102,520	94.18	−1.14
Informal votes		6,330	5.82	+1.14
Turnout		108,850	93.46	+4.65
Two-party-preferred result
Liberal	Mary Aldred	55,451	54.09	+1.19
Labor	Tully Fletcher	47,069	45.91	−1.19
Liberal hold		Swing	+1.19	

=== Nicholls ===
2025 Australian federal election: Nicholls
Party	Candidate	Votes	%	±%
National	Sam Birrell	48,762	46.24	+21.93
Labor	Kim Travers	25,560	24.24	+11.08
One Nation	Aaron Tyrrell	12,095	11.47	+4.87
Greens	Shelby Eade	8,235	7.81	+4.08
Trumpet of Patriots	Glenn Floyd	4,999	4.74	+4.24
Family First	Paul Bachelor	4,717	4.47	+4.47
Citizens	Jeff Davy	1,082	1.03	+0.66
Total formal votes		105,450	94.99	+2.63
Informal votes		5,556	5.01	−2.63
Turnout		111,006	91.45	+1.49
Two-party-preferred result
National	Sam Birrell	67,887	64.38	+1.87
Labor	Kim Travers	37,563	35.62	−1.87
National hold		Swing	+1.87	

=== Scullin ===
2025 Australian federal election: Scullin
Party	Candidate	Votes	%	±%
Labor	Andrew Giles	43,348	44.90	−1.31
Liberal	Rohit Taggar	19,807	20.52	−1.25
Greens	Loki Sangarya	9,090	9.42	−1.44
One Nation	Arthur Tsoutsoulis	6,401	6.63	+0.15
Victorian Socialists	Omar Hassan	6,227	6.45	+3.74
Trumpet of Patriots	Adriana Buccianti	5,479	5.68	+5.62
Family First	Cassandra Bell	3,752	3.89	+3.89
People First	Ursula van Bree	2,441	2.53	+2.53
Total formal votes		96,545	92.38	−1.86
Informal votes		7,961	7.62	+1.86
Turnout		104,506	90.93	+5.77
Two-party-preferred result
Labor	Andrew Giles	62,072	64.29	−1.14
Liberal	Rohit Taggar	34,473	35.71	+1.14
Labor hold		Swing	−1.14	

=== Wannon ===
2025 Australian federal election: Wannon
Party	Candidate	Votes	%	±%
Liberal	Dan Tehan	47,312	43.64	−0.59
Independent	Alex Dyson	34,012	31.38	+12.72
Labor	Fiona Mackenzie	11,438	10.55	−9.05
One Nation	Leo Curtain	4,529	4.18	+0.96
Greens	Kate Gazzard	3,427	3.16	−3.50
Legalise Cannabis	Robbie Swan	3,037	2.80	+2.80
Family First	Lee-Ann Elmes	2,065	1.90	+1.90
Trumpet of Patriots	Julie McCamish	1,789	1.65	+1.62
Independent	Bernadine Atkinson	794	0.73	+0.73
Total formal votes		108,403	94.68	−0.11
Informal votes		6,086	5.32	+0.11
Turnout		114,489	94.01	+1.36
Notional two-party-preferred count
Liberal	Dan Tehan	66,038	60.92	+2.27
Labor	Fiona Mackenzie	42,365	39.08	−2.27
Two-candidate-preferred result
Liberal	Dan Tehan	57,749	53.27	−0.23
Independent	Alex Dyson	50,654	46.73	+0.23
Liberal hold		Swing	−0.23	

=== Wills ===
2025 Australian federal election: Wills
Party	Candidate	Votes	%	±%
Labor	Peter Khalil	39,069	35.59	−0.83
Greens	Samantha Ratnam	38,834	35.37	+2.54
Liberal	Jeff Kidney	14,121	12.86	−3.33
Socialist Alliance	Sue Bolton	8,808	8.02	+5.13
One Nation	Bruce Stevens	3,842	3.50	+1.05
Legalise Cannabis	Margee Glover	3,067	2.79	+2.79
Fusion	Owen Miller	1,122	1.02	+1.02
Libertarian	Rachel Versteegen	918	0.84	+0.59
Total formal votes		109,781	95.56	+0.22
Informal votes		5,106	4.44	−0.22
Turnout		114,887	91.72	+5.52
Notional two-party-preferred count
Labor	Peter Khalil	88,770	80.86	+3.77
Liberal	Jeff Kidney	21,011	19.14	−3.77
Two-candidate-preferred result
Labor	Peter Khalil	56,459	51.43	−7.60
Greens	Samantha Ratnam	53,322	48.57	+7.60
Labor hold		Swing	−7.60	
