= Electoral results for the Division of Calwell =

Australian division election results

This is a list of electoral results for the Division of Calwell in Australian federal elections from the division's creation in 1984 until the present.

== Members ==
Member	Party	Term
Andrew Theophanous	Labor	1984–2000
Andrew Theophanous	Independent	2000–2001
Maria Vamvakinou	Labor	2001–2025
Basem Abdo	Labor	2025–present

== Election results ==
=== Elections in the 2020s ===
==== 2025 ====
2025 Australian federal election: Calwell
Party	Candidate	Votes	%	±%
Labor	Basem Abdo	27,423	30.53	−14.33
Liberal	Usman Ghani	14,102	15.70	−8.01
Independent	Carly Moore	10,735	11.95	+11.95
Independent	Joseph Youhana	9,628	10.72	+10.72
Greens	Ravneet Kaur Garcha	7,439	8.28	−1.47
Independent	Samim Moslih	6,155	6.85	+6.85
One Nation	Luay Toma	3,375	3.76	−3.24
Legalise Cannabis	Gianni Del Rosario-Makridis	2,843	3.16	+3.16
Citizens	Bassima Hawli	2,624	2.92	+2.92
Family First	Maria Bengtsson	2,308	2.57	+2.57
Trumpet of Patriots	Assaad Issa	2,211	2.46	+0.68
Independent	Ravi Ragupathy	501	0.56	+0.56
	Morgan Peach	487	0.54	+0.54
Total formal votes		89,831	89.39	−4.32
Informal votes		10,657	10.61	+4.32
Turnout		100,488	86.97	+9.97
Notional two-party-preferred count
Labor	Basem Abdo	58,127	64.71	+2.32
Liberal	Usman Ghani	31,704	35.29	−2.32
Two-candidate-preferred result
Labor	Basem Abdo	49,481	55.08	−7.31
Independent	Carly Moore	40,350	44.92	+44.92
Labor hold				

==== 2022 ====
2022 Australian federal election: Calwell
Party	Candidate	Votes	%	±%
Labor	Maria Vamvakinou	38,127	44.86	−9.57
Liberal	Tim Staker-Gunn	20,111	23.66	−0.63
Greens	Natalie Abboud	8,277	9.74	+3.01
United Australia	Joshua Naim	7,578	8.92	+5.45
One Nation	Mark Preston	5,957	7.01	+7.01
Victorian Socialists	Jerome Small	3,433	4.04	−0.74
Federation	Maria Bengtsson	1,512	1.78	+1.78
Total formal votes		84,995	93.69	+3.03
Informal votes		5,724	6.31	−3.03
Turnout		90,719	85.02	−1.04
Two-party-preferred result
Labor	Maria Vamvakinou	53,032	62.39	−7.23
Liberal	Tim Staker-Gunn	31,963	37.61	+7.23
Labor hold		Swing	−7.23	

Alluvial diagram for preference flows in the seat of Calwell in the 2022 federal election. indicates at what stage the winning candidate had over 50% of the votes and was declared the winner.

=== Elections in the 2010s ===
==== 2019 ====
2019 Australian federal election: Calwell
Party	Candidate	Votes	%	±%
Labor	Maria Vamvakinou	47,115	53.88	−4.80
Liberal	Genevieve Hamilton	21,978	25.13	−0.52
Greens	Polly Morgan	5,893	6.74	−1.27
Victorian Socialists	Jerome Small	3,984	4.56	+4.56
United Australia	Prakul Chhabra	3,037	3.47	+3.47
Citizens Electoral Council	Keith Kerr	2,851	3.26	+3.26
Conservative National	Adam Vail	1,771	2.03	+2.03
Socialist Equality	Peter Byrne	823	0.94	+0.94
Total formal votes		87,452	90.78	−2.34
Informal votes		8,884	9.22	+2.34
Turnout		96,336	89.61	+4.25
Two-party-preferred result
Labor	Maria Vamvakinou	60,164	68.80	−0.93
Liberal	Genevieve Hamilton	27,288	31.20	+0.93
Labor hold		Swing	−0.93	

==== 2016 ====
2016 Australian federal election: Calwell
Party	Candidate	Votes	%	±%
Labor	Maria Vamvakinou	51,040	56.81	+7.00
Liberal	John Hsu (disendorsed) (Note: The Liberal candidate John Hsu resigned from the party's ticket in June 2016. However, due to the AEC's nomination deadlines, Mr Hsu's name still appeared under the Liberal Party ticket on the ballot paper.)	24,855	27.66	−0.83
Greens	Natalie Abboud	7,609	8.47	+3.08
Animal Justice	Megan Searls	3,229	3.59	+3.59
Independent	Michael Lakkis	3,115	3.47	+3.47
Total formal votes		89,848	93.46	+1.38
Informal votes		6,286	6.54	−1.38
Turnout		96,134	87.87	−3.06
Two-party-preferred result
Labor	Maria Vamvakinou	60,978	67.87	+4.01
Liberal	John Hsu	28,870	32.13	−4.01
Labor hold		Swing	+4.01	

==== 2013 ====
2013 Australian federal election: Calwell
Party	Candidate	Votes	%	±%
Labor	Maria Vamvakinou	42,819	49.81	−7.80
Liberal	Ali Khan	24,490	28.49	+2.97
Greens	Joanna Nevill	4,632	5.39	−5.80
Palmer United	Bryce Letcher	3,728	4.34	+4.34
Sex Party	Nevena Spirovska	2,367	2.75	+2.75
Family First	Paul Graham	2,175	2.53	−2.15
Christians	Maria Bengtsson	2,121	2.47	+2.47
Katter's Australian	Brett Watson	1,915	2.23	+2.23
Democratic Labour	Omar Jabir	1,310	1.52	+1.52
Rise Up Australia	Charles Rozario	415	0.48	+0.48
Total formal votes		85,972	92.08	−0.91
Informal votes		7,398	7.92	+0.91
Turnout		93,370	90.93	−1.23
Two-party-preferred result
Labor	Maria Vamvakinou	54,906	63.86	−6.20
Liberal	Ali Khan	31,066	36.14	+6.20
Labor hold		Swing	−6.20	

==== 2010 ====
2010 Australian federal election: Calwell
Party	Candidate	Votes	%	±%
Labor	Maria Vamvakinou	49,580	56.63	−3.59
Liberal	Wayne Tseng	22,556	25.76	−0.79
Greens	Lenka Thompson	10,386	11.86	+7.50
Family First	Jeff Truscott	3,851	4.40	+0.06
Socialist Equality	Peter Byrne	1,181	1.35	+1.03
Total formal votes		87,554	93.47	−1.68
Informal votes		6,114	6.53	+1.68
Turnout		93,668	92.45	−2.39
Two-party-preferred result
Labor	Maria Vamvakinou	61,045	69.72	+0.39
Liberal	Wayne Tseng	26,509	30.28	−0.39
Labor hold		Swing	+0.39	

=== Elections in the 2000s ===
==== 2007 ====
2007 Australian federal election: Calwell
Party	Candidate	Votes	%	±%
Labor	Maria Vamvakinou	51,952	60.22	+10.21
Liberal	Dianne Livett	22,906	26.55	−10.62
Greens	Brook Shaune	3,761	4.36	−0.90
Family First	Arthur Buller	3,747	4.34	+1.98
Citizens Electoral Council	Sleiman Yohanna	1,817	2.11	−0.09
Democrats	Vanessa Musolino	799	0.93	−0.56
Independent	Philip Cutler	624	0.72	+0.72
Independent	Don Hampshire	391	0.45	+0.45
Socialist Equality	Frank Gaglioti	273	0.32	+0.32
Total formal votes		86,270	95.15	+0.39
Informal votes		4,399	4.85	−0.39
Turnout		90,669	94.82	−0.53
Two-party-preferred result
Labor	Maria Vamvakinou	59,807	69.33	+11.14
Liberal	Dianne Livett	26,463	30.67	−11.14
Labor hold		Swing	+11.14	

==== 2004 ====
2004 Australian federal election: Calwell
Party	Candidate	Votes	%	±%
Labor	Maria Vamvakinou	39,692	50.01	−2.31
Liberal	Dianne Livett	29,504	37.17	+8.60
Greens	Mohamad Alman	4,175	5.26	+1.91
Family First	Gary Canham	1,870	2.36	+2.36
Citizens Electoral Council	Sleiman Yohanna	1,745	2.20	+1.72
Independent	Denis Towers	1,202	1.51	+1.51
Democrats	Jonathon Gatt	1,180	1.49	−2.91
Total formal votes		79,368	94.76	+0.33
Informal votes		4,391	5.24	−0.33
Turnout		83,759	95.35	+0.73
Two-party-preferred result
Labor	Maria Vamvakinou	46,184	58.19	−7.04
Liberal	Dianne Livett	33,184	41.81	+7.04
Labor hold		Swing	−7.04	

==== 2001 ====
2001 Australian federal election: Calwell
Party	Candidate	Votes	%	±%
Labor	Maria Vamvakinou	45,203	51.85	−10.50
Liberal	Darren Buller	22,020	25.26	−1.06
Independent	Andrew Theophanous	8,392	9.63	+9.63
Democrats	Robert Livesay	3,356	3.85	−2.84
No GST	John Abbotto	3,074	3.53	+3.53
Greens	Bee Barker	2,105	2.41	+2.41
Independent	D. Dervish	2,003	2.30	+2.30
	Mohamed Bochi	555	0.64	+0.64
Citizens Electoral Council	Sleiman Yohanna	465	0.53	+0.53
Total formal votes		87,173	93.56	−3.00
Informal votes		6,005	6.44	+3.00
Turnout		93,178	95.28	+0.73
Two-party-preferred result
Labor	Maria Vamvakinou	59,044	67.73	−1.25
Liberal	Darren Buller	28,129	32.27	+1.25
Labor hold		Swing	−1.25	

=== Elections in the 1990s ===
==== 1998 ====
1998 Australian federal election: Calwell
Party	Candidate	Votes	%	±%
Labor	Andrew Theophanous	50,022	62.36	+1.02
Liberal	Trevor Blake	21,111	26.32	−2.52
Democrats	Robert Livesay	5,363	6.69	−0.25
Unity	Benal Keceli	2,968	3.70	+3.70
Natural Law	Michael Harris	755	0.94	+0.21
Total formal votes		80,219	96.55	+0.31
Informal votes		2,864	3.45	−0.31
Turnout		83,083	95.15	−0.48
Two-party-preferred result
Labor	Andrew Theophanous	55,334	68.98	+1.78
Liberal	Trevor Blake	24,885	31.02	−1.78
Labor hold		Swing	+1.78	

==== 1996 ====
1996 Australian federal election: Calwell
Party	Candidate	Votes	%	±%
Labor	Andrew Theophanous	43,986	61.33	−1.55
Liberal	Bill Willis	20,679	28.83	−0.83
Democrats	Robert Livesay	4,975	6.94	+4.04
	Sue Phillips	1,554	2.17	+2.17
Natural Law	Richard Barnes	522	0.73	+0.13
Total formal votes		71,716	96.24	−0.23
Informal votes		2,800	3.76	+0.23
Turnout		74,516	95.63	−0.46
Two-party-preferred result
Labor	Andrew Theophanous	48,067	67.19	+0.08
Liberal	Bill Willis	23,467	32.81	−0.08
Labor hold		Swing	+0.08	

==== 1993 ====
1993 Australian federal election: Calwell
Party	Candidate	Votes	%	±%
Labor	Andrew Theophanous	48,749	64.53	+19.01
Liberal	Dianne Livett	21,752	28.79	−4.01
Democrats	David Mackay	2,140	2.83	−9.20
Independent	Veronica Rodenburg	1,373	1.82	+1.82
AAFI	Rod Spencer	1,013	1.34	+1.34
Natural Law	Sandy Price	522	0.69	+0.69
Total formal votes		75,549	96.26	+1.82
Informal votes		2,936	3.74	−1.82
Turnout		78,485	96.09	
Two-party-preferred result
Labor	Andrew Theophanous	51,672	68.44	+11.37
Liberal	Dianne Livett	23,831	31.56	−11.37
Labor hold		Swing	+11.37	

==== 1990 ====
1990 Australian federal election: Calwell
Party	Candidate	Votes	%	±%
Labor	Andrew Theophanous	29,466	45.5	−12.6
Liberal	Dianne Livett	21,232	32.8	+2.7
Democrats	Doug Lorman	7,791	12.0	+2.1
Independent	Jack Culpin	4,493	6.9	+6.9
Call to Australia	Rob Lukanic	1,751	2.7	+2.7
Total formal votes		64,733	94.4	
Informal votes		3,815	5.6	
Turnout		68,548	95.2	
Two-party-preferred result
Labor	Andrew Theophanous	36,875	57.1	−8.5
Liberal	Dianne Livett	27,744	42.9	+8.5
Labor hold		Swing	−8.5	

=== Elections in the 1980s ===
==== 1987 ====
1987 Australian federal election: Calwell
Party	Candidate	Votes	%	±%
Labor	Andrew Theophanous	36,614	61.1	−7.7
Liberal	Chris Dimitrijevic	16,244	27.1	+2.2
Democrats	Louise Stewart	5,938	9.9	+5.2
National	Ivan Pavlekovich-Smith	1,130	1.9	+1.9
Total formal votes		59,926	90.1	
Informal votes		6,555	9.9	
Turnout		66,481	96.0	
Two-party-preferred result
Labor	Andrew Theophanous	41,077	68.6	−3.6
Liberal	Chris Dimitrijevic	18,807	31.4	+3.6
Labor hold		Swing	−3.6	

==== 1984 ====
1984 Australian federal election: Calwell
Party	Candidate	Votes	%	±%
Labor	Andrew Theophanous	36,660	68.8	+0.6
Liberal	Graham Andersen	13,277	24.9	+0.1
Democrats	Lesley Ellen	2,502	4.7	+0.0
Democratic Labor	Martin Mulholland	870	1.6	+1.6
Total formal votes		53,309	87.0	
Informal votes		7,979	13.0	
Turnout		61,288	95.4	
Two-party-preferred result
Labor	Andrew Theophanous	38,474	72.2	+0.0
Liberal	Graham Andersen	14,830	27.8	−0.0
Labor notional hold		Swing	+0.0	
