= Gladstone Park Secondary College =

Location
- Gladstone Park, Victoria; Australia; 37°41′19″S 144°53′29″E

Information
- Type: Co-educational public comprehensive secondary school
- Motto: Knowledge is Power
- Established: 1974
- Principal: Harold Cheung
- Years offered: 7–12
- Enrolment: 1644 (2018)
- Campus: Taylor Drive
- Colours: Dark green, white, grey & black

Gladstone Park Secondary College is a public state school in Melbourne, Australia founded in 1974.

== Introduction ==
The school has around More than 1600 students, a figure which has remained roughly constant for over a decade. When it first opened, Gladstone Park Secondary School (GPSC) quickly became the largest school in terms of matriculated students within a 10 km radius, a position which it still holds today.

== School life ==
The school has a special disability partnership with the local TAFE institutes, where most GPSC graduates enrol to do apprenticeships or diplomas.

== Facilities ==
The school grounds contain many sports facilities including a football and soccer oval, outdoor basketball and netball courts, cricket nets and an outdoor hockey/ futsal pitch. There is an indoor sports centre with two basketball courts, squash courts and gym facilities. The school library is open to students and the public.

A joint senior school office and year 12 study centre building opened in 2017.

== Controversies ==
=== Deepfake incident ===
In February 2025, Gladstone Park Secondary College was involved in a police investigation after students allegedly created and distributed sexually explicit images of female classmates using artificial intelligence ("deepfake") technology.

The images were reportedly generated from existing photographs and shared via social media and messaging platforms without the consent of those depicted. Victoria Police launched an investigation, with the matter referred to specialist units dealing with child exploitation and cybercrime.

The school suspended students in connection with the incident and provided wellbeing support to those affected. The case received widespread media coverage and contributed to broader discussion in Australia regarding the misuse of artificial intelligence, online safety, and image-based abuse laws.

=== Antisemitism incident ===
In July 2025, the school faced criticism following reports of antisemitic behaviour by students, including offensive gestures and comments directed at members of the Jewish community. The principal issued an apology and stated that the school would take disciplinary action and reinforce education around respectful behaviour and inclusion.

== Notable alumni ==
Politics

- Basem Abdo MP - Federal Member for Calwell

Sport

- Jordan Bannister – Former Australian rules football player and umpire
- Aziz Behich - Socceroo
- Corey McKernan – Former Australian rules footballer
- Shaun McKernan – AFL Footballer

Australian Defence Force

- Cameron Baird – recipient of the Victoria Cross for Australia.
