= Murder of Liep Gony =

2007 murder of a Sudanese Australian man in a suburb of Melbourne

- Location: Noble Park, Victoria, Australia.
- Date: 26 September 2007
- Attack type: Murder by beating
- Perpetrators: Clinton David Rintoull; Dylan Giuseppe Sabatino
- Verdict: Rintoull, guilty of murder Sabatino, guilty of manslaughter
- Sentence: Rintoull, 20 years imprisonment Sabatino, 10 years imprisonment

Liep Gony (/ljep goŋ/) was a Sudanese Australian man who was murdered on the night of 26 September 2007, near Noble Park railway station in the Melbourne suburb of Noble Park.

His killers were Clinton David Rintoull and Dylan Giuseppe Sabatino, both white Australians, who were unknown to Gony and targeted him because of his skin colour. During the unprovoked assault, the pair beat Gony with metal poles, leading to a fatal head injury. Before the attack, Rintoull had sprayed racist graffiti in various locations, used violent and racist language and expressed his intention to kill a black man. Despite this, following the men's convictions, presiding judge Justice Elizabeth Curran ruled that the killers' actions had been motivated "by a complex set of factors", and as such, racial motivation would not be considered an aggravating factor.

The murder was a key episode in the development of the African gangs moral panic in Australia, as initial reports from police, politicians, and the press suggested Gony had been murdered as part of "African gang violence". Immigration minister Kevin Andrews stated in response to the murder that "Some groups of immigrants aren't settling and adjusting into the Australian life as quickly as we would hope." Although it quickly emerged that Gony had been murdered by white Australians, African gang discourse continued in the media, culminating with the Liberal National government's decision to reduce the number of humanitarian visas available to people from Sudan.

== Liep Gony ==
Liep Gony was a resettled refugee who had become an Australian citizen after arriving in the country as an 11-year-old. He was nineteen at the time of his death.

His mother, Martha Ojulo, had fled South Sudan, then part of Sudan, after her relatives were tortured during the civil war. The family lived in refugee camps in Ethiopia for a period, where one of Liep's siblings died in a house fire. Liep was one of five brothers and sisters who arrived in Australia with his grandmother in 1999. He initially lived in Hobart before moving to Victoria in 2001. He was reunited with his mother in 2003 when she was resettled in Australia. At the time of his death, Gony had been accepted into a graphic design course.

At a 2018 memorial for Gony, his cousin told the congregation that "Liep showed respect and love to people of all ages, ethnicity and sexual orientations," and reminisced about how he would speak passionately about politics, music and racism in Australia and the world. His mother described him as "a good son who was thoughtful and caring".

== Murder ==
=== Fatal attack ===
The fatal attack was committed by 22-year-old Clinton Rintoull and 19-year-old Dylan Sabatino on the night of 26 September 2007 at around 11 o'clock, near Noble Park train station. Gony was beaten severely with two metal poles and suffered extensive head injuries, from which he would later die. He was selected randomly as a victim due to his being a Sudanese Australian, a group against which Rintoull had shown racist behaviour in the days leading up to the assault.

==== Perpetrators' activities prior to the murder ====
At the time of the murder, Gony's killers were staying at a house rented by Rintoull's ex-girlfriend in Briggs Crescent, Noble Park. The men were Victorians, but had arrived at the address on 14 September 2007 after 11 months of living out of state.

In the days leading up to the murder, Rintoull made frequent negative references to the Sudanese community and black people in general. On Sunday, 23 September, Rintoull made an anonymous call to the police, claiming he had been chased and threatened by a group of Sudanese youths. On this call, Rintoull stated that if the police did not do something about the Sudanese in the area, he would. In the following days, Rintoull showed his ex-girlfriend a local newspaper story headlined "Bronx fear", which complained about "recalcitrant migrants". He stated to her that the Sudanese people were "turning the local area into the Bronx".

On the evening of 26 September, Rintoull and Sabatino were drinking in the house at Briggs Crescent. Rintoull was also smoking cannabis. Rintoull's ex-girlfriend had been served an eviction notice that morning, and that evening the men, angered by the eviction, began to punch holes in the walls and spray-paint graffiti around the property. Among the graffiti was the phrase "fuck da niggas".

At around 10 p.m., Rintoull was observed outside the house by neighbours carrying a metal pole. A neighbour, walking his dog, saw Rintoull standing in the middle of the road and heard him shout, “These blacks are turning the town into the Bronx. I am going to take my town back, I’m looking to kill the blacks.” Sabatino's girlfriend later heard him say, "I guess I’ll go and take my anger out on some niggers." Rintoull then left the house, and his ex-girlfriend asked Sabatino to follow him to ensure he was alright.

==== The bashing of Liep Gony ====
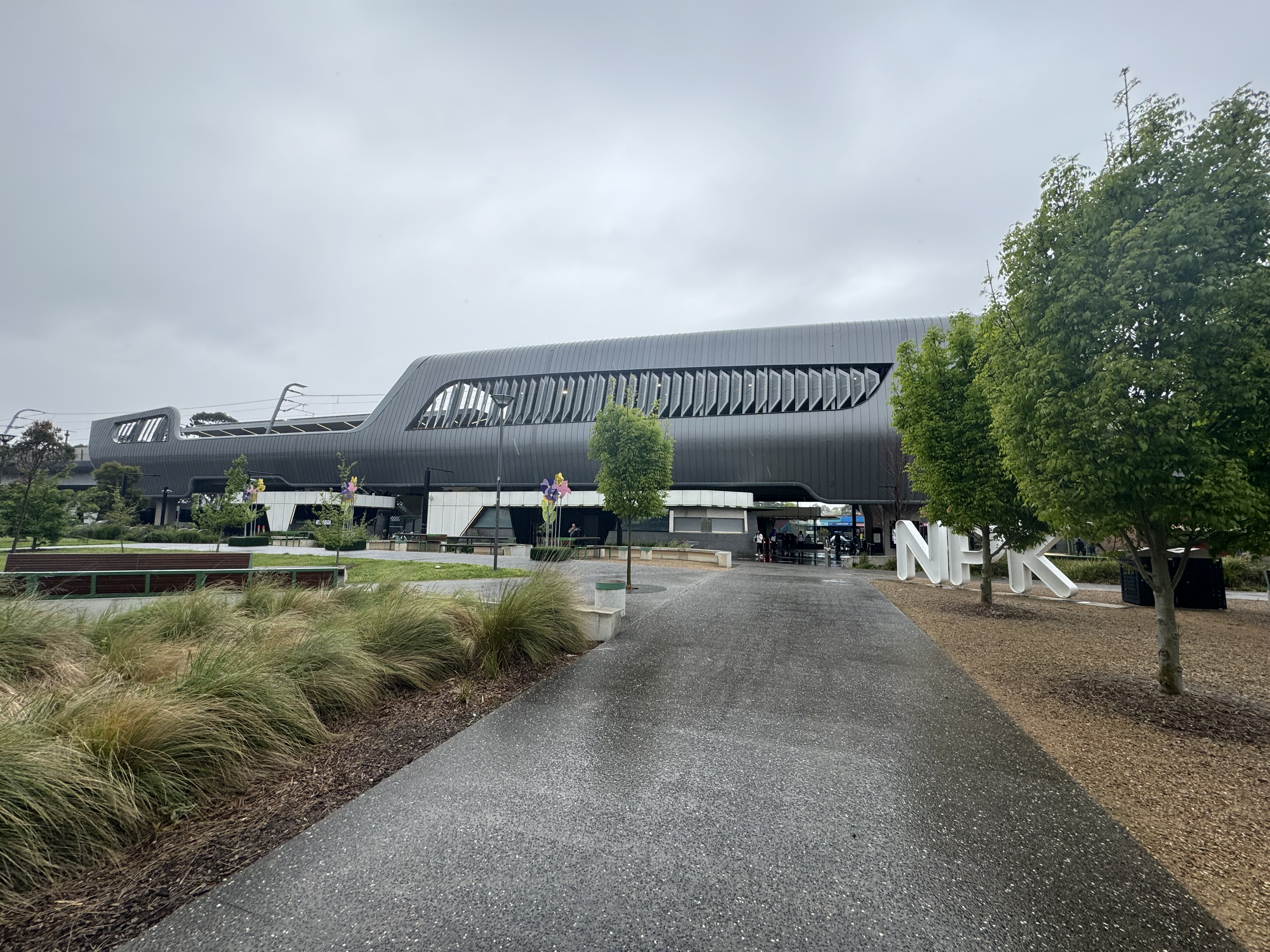
Noble Park railway station, close to the scene of the murder of Liep Gony

Liep Gony had spent the evening in the area of Noble Park station, drinking with friends. Gony's cousin, Lock Fouch, testified that he last saw him at 21:45, sitting alone near the railway station in a very inebriated condition.

Some time before 22:40, Gony was approached by Sabatino and Rintoull, who were both carrying metal poles. At their trial, the pair asserted that Gony was in the company of another African man, who ran away when they approached. However, no evidence supporting this was presented. The pair then subjected Gony to a brutal beating using the metal poles and their hands and feet. Rintoull hit Gony on the head around 15 times with the pole, and several times on the body. Sabatino hit Gony with the pole around 5 times. The trial judge stated that, due to the amount of alcohol in his system, the victim would have been incapable of resisting the attack in any way.

The killers then returned home, leaving Gony unconscious on the floor. They had been outside the house for around 15 minutes.

==== Injuries sustained by the victim ====
Liep Gony sustained head injuries that would prove fatal during the assault. The trial judge, in her summing up of the case, stated that Gony had suffered multiple petechial haemorrhages, subarachnoid haemorrhage, a commuted fracture of the distal left ulna, a fractured left nasal bone, a right acute subdural haematoma, a fractured left base of the skull, the depressed occipital bone fracture, a fracture of the left orbital floor, and occipital scalp lacerations and forearm lacerations.

Following his death, an autopsy was conducted, which identified the specific cause of death as a "depressed fracture of the rear left side of the skull."

=== Events following the attack ===
==== Discovery and hospitalisation of Liep Gony ====
Seriously injured but still alive, Liep Gony was discovered by a passing motorist, who recognised him as an acquaintance, at 10:40. The motorist ran to a nearby property, from where an ambulance was called, which arrived 18 minutes after Gony had been found. Gony's mother had been advised he was in Noble Park, though she was unaware of the attack, and arrived at the scene accompanied by Gony's sister as he was being put into the ambulance. One of Gony's brothers was also present.

Gony was transported to Alfred Hospital, where he was operated on urgently to alleviate the pressure on his brain and placed on life support. Over the next day, his condition worsened, and the medical staff judged that no recovery was possible. He was removed from life support at 10:40 on Thursday, 27 September, and died within minutes.

==== Actions of the perpetrators following the attack ====
According to the testimony of Sabatino's girlfriend, immediately following the attack, the two men returned home and washed the poles, which were now bent. She would also testify that Rintoull said, "I bashed a nigger, and I think he’s dead." Rintoull's ex-girlfriend would also tell police that he confessed to the attack and had hidden the poles in her yard. Rintoull also confessed to his ex-girlfriend's sister in a telephone call, saying he thought Gony was one of the men he claimed had chased him a few days earlier. The next day, Rintoull, Sabatino, his girlfriend, and Rintoull's ex-girlfriend fled by coach to Adelaide.

By Friday the 28th, the police had established that the four were suspects and had obtained warrants for telephone intercepts. The intercepts revealed the suspects discussing aspects of the murder with family members, and led to their arrest in South Australia on 30 September. In custody, Sabatino and Rintoull admitted responsibility for the attack to the police.

=== Trial and appeal ===
The initial trial hearings occurred on 30 September and 1 October 2009 at the Supreme Court of Victoria in Melbourne, with Justice Elizabeth Curtain presiding. At these proceedings, Rintoull pleaded guilty to murder and intentionally damaging property, while Sabatino pleaded guilty to manslaughter and intentionally damaging property. The men were sentenced on 18 December 2009. Rintoull was given 20 years imprisonment, with a 16-year minimum tariff. Sabatino was sentenced to 10 years, with a 6-year minimum. The men's sentences took into consideration their confessions, remorse, guilty pleas, lack of criminal records, and difficult backgrounds.

==== Controversy over racial motivation ====
The sentencing has provoked press and academic controversy, as well as criticism from Gony's family, as Justice Curtain ruled that racial motivation was not an aggravating factor in the murder, and as such would not lead to an increased sentence as mandated by law. Her reasoning for this decision was based on evidence that Rintoull had motives other than simple racial prejudice, and her view that it could not be proven beyond a reasonable doubt that "racism per se was a motive for the attack." Justice Curtain recognised that Rintoull had frequently used racist language, specifically the word "nigger", and expressed a desire to kill a black man and "take his town back". However, Curtain concluded that the initial motivation for the killing was an alleged incident where Rintoull had been chased by a "gang" of black men. This was, in Justice Curtain's opinion, combined with Rintoull's concerns about the lawlessness he perceived as arising from the congregation of Sudanese men around Noble Park railway station, and the newspaper article he had read entitled "Bronx Fear", to create a "complex set of motives". The judge also argued that Rintoull's kindness to a homeless Sudanese boy several days before the attack suggested a lack of racial motivation.

Curtain's decision was criticised by Australian legal scholars Mason and Dyer on the grounds that, in Australian law, there is no requirement that racial animosity be the sole motivation for the crime for more serious penalties to be warranted. Furthermore, in summing up, Curtain ruled that Rintoull and Sabatino's aggression was directed towards the young Sudanese men who had allegedly chased Rintoull "irrespective of their race", which again met with Mason and Dyer's criticism. In their view, this statement lacked a basis in fact, as the premeditation, evidence of prejudice before the attack, and random selection of a victim demonstrated a clear decision to commit a crime against Gony based solely on his ethnicity.

The judge had initially decided to bar the press from publishing photos of the two men and their racist vandalism before the killing, because this may lead to violence towards the pair inside prison. The Herald Sun newspaper requested that Justice Curtain lift this ban, which occurred in February 2010. Upon lifting the ban, Curtain stated, "If release and publication of the photographs will lead to persons forming an opinion that the killing was racially motivated, so be it. People are entitled to their views even if formed on a basis different from the material placed before the sentencing judge."

In a 2018 interview, Liep Gony's mother, Martha Ojulo, explained that the judge's refusal to consider the racial animus of the murder had heightened her grief. She pointed out that Rintoull had been heard shouting, "These blacks are turning the town into the Bronx. I am going to take my town back. I’m looking to kill the blacks". In the same interview, she stated that she believed this to be an entirely racially motivated crime, saying, “Liep was not killed because he did something wrong. Liep was killed because of his skin colour - because I gave birth to him with black skin.”

==== Rintoull's Appeal ====
In August 2011, Rintoull appealed against his minimum tariff of 16 years. The court rejected the argument that the sentence was "manifestly excessive", citing the brutality of the attack as its reason.

== Press and political response ==
Despite the fact that it later emerged that Gony had been murdered by white assailants, the immediate response to Gony's murder from politicians and the press was to frame it as an example of "African gang" violence. This response continued long after Rintoull and Sabatino's arrest and charging, and would have a negative effect on the Sudanese Australian community, leading to an increase in racism directed towards them, further racially motivated attacks, and a tightening of immigration rules against people of Sudanese origin. The intense media and political focus on Sudanese Australians in Melbourne in the spring and summer of 2007, alongside the presence of a discourse around criminality and supposed gangs, prefigured the moral panic around gang crime that would break out in 2016.

=== Political response ===
In September 2007, Australia was in the midst of the 2007 federal election campaign, which had already focused on questions of race and immigration in a sometimes extreme and discriminatory tone. Soon after the murder, Kevin Andrews, the minister for immigration, declared, "Some groups of immigrants aren't settling and adjusting into the Australian life as quickly as we would hope." Initial press reports took the position that the murder was an example of "ethnic gang violence", basing their stories on off-the-record comments from anonymous police officers and local residents, with Andrews stating that officers had told him Melbourne had "a serious Sudanese gang problem." However, at the time of the murder, Melbourne Police's Multicultural Liaison officer told The Australian that police often mistook innocent groups of Black youths for gangs.

When it became clear that Gony had been murdered by two white men, Andrews declined to apologise for his comments on Sudanese-Australians, stating "I'm not proposing to apologise for saying what people are concerned about." Minister Andrews was also reticent to comment on the white attackers who bashed another Sudanese man in an openly racist attack the day after Gony's funeral, which sociologist Joel Windle contrasts with his immediate condemnation of an attack by Sudanese youths on a policeman as "un-Australian". Clashes between Sudanese youth and police occurred on several occasions between September and December, with police accounts of the violence in one alleged "riot" contradicted by witnesses.

In the aftermath of the events, the Liberal–National Coalition presented the murder and assaults in Melbourne as examples of a "failure of integration" and cited them as justification for a reduction in the percentage of humanitarian visas given to Africans from 70% to 30%. Queensland Premier Anna Bligh criticised this decision and Andrews' comments, stating they were racist and "coming from the deep south of America in the 1950s." Bligh's comments were classified as "outrageous" and "completely wrong" by the then Prime Minister John Howard, while Andrews was also supported by Pauline Hanson, leader of the right-wing populist anti-migrant party One Nation.

In Melbourne, the day after Liep Gony's funeral, seventeen-year-old Ajang Ajor was bashed and hit with bottles by a group of white men, who called him a "black dog". He stated after the attack that he believed Andrews's comments had incited his attackers to violence.

=== Press response ===
In his analysis of reporting on the events around Gony's murder, Windle highlights the process of racialisation by which the Australian and the Herald Sun universally labelled non-white individuals with ethnic markers when discussing them, contrasting this with the assumed default de-racialised status of whiteness when discussing anonymous "locals". He also notes the frequent negative use of language in association with these ethnic markers, especially around groups of young people.

Language used in newspaper articles to describe ethnic groups in Melbourne between 26 September 2007 and 6 December 2007
| Group | Racial attributes | Collective attributes | Age attributes | Migration attributes | Locality | Moral quality |
|---|---|---|---|---|---|---|
| Racialised African refugees | African, North African, Of African descent, Black, Sudanese, Sudanese-born | a mob, packs, a gang, gangs, a group, community | youth(s), kids, children, under-age, teenagers, teens, juvenile | refugees, immigrants, migrants | residents | delinquent, lawless, thugs, offenders |
| De-racialised "local" sources | White, Caucasian, Non-African | the community, the people | [age]-year-old | long-term Australians, locally-born | locals, residents, long-time residents, home-grown neighbours, local businesses | |

A group of academics specialising in analysis of journalism (Nolan, Farquharson, Politoff and Marjoribanks) also found frequent use of loaded terms like "troublemakers" and "gang violence", as well as "Sudanese gangs", which were implied to exist without supporting evidence. However, they also note that these claims of Sudanese violence were contested in some articles and that this focus lessened when it became clear Gony's murderers were white. The group argue that the depiction of Sudan as a space of violence in the articles regarding supposed gangs is a framing of violence as something external to Australia which has been brought by refugees from their homeland.

Windle also states that newspapers frequently put forward false, racialised and racist depictions of Sudanese people in the wake of the Gony murder, justifying them as transmitting genuine concerns of the public or unnamed police officers. In one example, the Herald Sun newspaper argued for understanding of locals who had distributed a leaflet falsely claiming that the Sudanese population of Melbourne were problematic because they were former child soldiers who had been trained to kill and rape. In the paper's view, the responsibility for negotiating "complex tensions" always lay with the newcomers.

A 2010 survey of Sudanese Australians living in Melbourne conducted by Melbourne University's Centre for Advancing Journalism also found serious concerns about the press coverage of Gony's death and its aftermath. The participants identified the tendency of the press to racialise crime reports, focusing on the ethnicity of offenders only when they were of African appearance and the tendency to use the term "refugee" even in cases where the individual has been resident in Australia for decades. Participants also felt that the press portrayed Sudanese poorly, especially in the unsupported and untrue assertion that "Sudanese gangs" were responsible for Gony's death, which they felt cemented the relationship between their community and gangs in the public consciousness, even after the gang aspect of the murder was proven false. The Sudanese reported job discrimination, racist violence, social exclusion and ostracism in public places in the wake of the killing, and attributed this directly to negative depictions of their community in the media.

Psychologist Clemence Due studied the framing of the discourse around Gony's death in Australian newspapers, finding that they centred whiteness as a "normative mode of belonging in Australia", which racialised people from non-white cultures and demanded their absorption into its values whether they chose to integrate our not. As such, the right to exist in Australia was framed as conditional on the approval of white society. She gives the example of Ajang Ajor, the teenage victim of a racist attack, whose working a part-time job while studying was presented in a report in The Age as a laudably "Australian" activity and so rendering Ajor to be deserving of sympathy. Due suggests that this report, though ostensibly sympathetic to an immigrant, actually implies that the right to be free from violence is conditional on the adoption of an "Australian" lifestyle that mimics the values and mores of the white community. This emphasis on conditional acceptance of migrants is also reflected in the findings of Nolan and colleagues, whose study of the press coverage that followed Gony's death found a media focus on exemplary culturally conforming immigrants who were contrasted with violent or non-conforming immigrants who would not be tolerated by majority white society.

Due also notes that writers in Australian newspapers in the period following Gony's murder frequently denied the existence of racism in Australia, despite the obvious contradictions arising from this position.

Caitlin Nunn points out that in the years prior to the attacks, there was nearly no representation of Sudanese Australians and other non-white people in the Australian media. This led to a presentation of the community as strangers and outsiders in news reports that followed Gony's death, and contributed to his depiction as having partial responsibility for his death owing to membership of an entirely fictional "Sudanese gang".

In Autumn 2008, The Australian published two articles which incorrectly implied that Gony's death was the result of Sudanese gang violence. A complaint was made by a member of the Sudanese community in Melbourne which was upheld by the Australian Press Council.
