= 1991 Menzies by-election =

11 May 1991
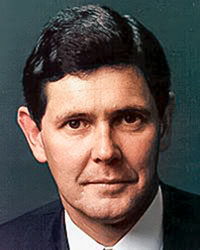
	First party	Second party
		DEM
Candidate	Kevin Andrews	Ken Peak
Party	Liberal	Democrats
Popular vote	40,154	13,070
Percentage	67.7%	22.0%
Swing	▲9.3	▲10.4
TPP	72.0%	28.0%
TPP swing	▲7.7	▲28.0
MP before election
Neil Brown
Liberal
Elected MP
Kevin Andrews
Liberal

The 1991 Menzies by-election was held in the Australian electorate of Menzies in Victoria on 11 May 1991. The by-election was triggered by the resignation of the sitting member, the former deputy Liberal Party leader Neil Brown.

The Australian Labor Party did not field a candidate. The by-election was won by the Liberal Party's Kevin Andrews.

== Results ==
Menzies by-election, 1991
Party	Candidate	Votes	%	±%
Liberal	Kevin Andrews	40,154	67.7	+9.3
Democrats	Ken Peak	13,070	22.0	+10.4
Against Further Immigration	Denis McCormack	4,055	6.8	+6.8
Independent	Jim Bernard	2,035	3.4	+3.4
Total formal votes		59,314	95.0	−1.9
Informal votes		3,103	5.0	+1.9
Turnout		62,417	86.1	−10.5
Two-party-preferred result
Liberal	Kevin Andrews	42,719	72.0	+7.7
Democrats	Ken Peak	16,578	28.0	+28.0
Liberal hold		Swing	N/A	

== See also ==
- List of Australian federal by-elections
