= Maria Vamvakinou =

Australian politician (born 1959)

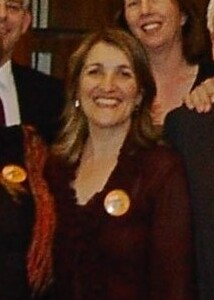
- Vamvakinou in 2005

Member of the Australian Parliament for Calwell
- In office 10 November 2001 – 28 March 2025
- Preceded by: Andrew Theophanous
- Succeeded by: Basem Abdo

Personal details
- Born: 4 January 1959 (age 67) Lefkada, Kingdom of Greece
- Citizenship: Australian; Greek (until 2000)
- Party: Labor
- Spouse: Michalis S. Michael
- Children: 2
- Education: University of Melbourne
- Occupation: Teacher; Politician
- Website: mariavamvakinou.com

Maria Vamvakinou (Greek: Μαρία Βαμβακινού) (born 4 January 1959) is an Australian politician. She is a member of the Australian Labor Party (ALP) and served in the House of Representatives from 2001 to 2025, representing the Division of Calwell in Victoria.

== Early life ==
Vamvakinou was born in Lefkada, a Greek island in the Ionian Sea. She arrived in Australia with her family in 1963 at the age of four, settling in Melbourne. She renounced her Greek citizenship in 2000 prior to standing for parliament. Vamvakinou was educated at public schools in Carlton and Brunswick before going on to attend Princes Hill High School.

Vamvakinou completed a Bachelor of Arts in Modern Greek and political science at the University of Melbourne. She went on to complete a diploma in education and worked as a high school teacher from 1982 to 1987, teaching Greek.

== Politics ==
Vamvakinou held office in the Victorian Labor Party and worked as a political staffer for a number of years before entering parliament herself. She worked as an electorate officer to Andrew Theophanous (1988, 1990), executive assistant to Joan Kirner (1989), personal secretary to Andrew McCutcheon (1991), and electorate officer to Senator Kim Carr (1993–2001). She also served on the Northcote City Council from 1990 to 1992.

=== Parliament ===
Vamvakinou was elected to parliament at the 2001 federal election, regaining the Division of Calwell in northern Melbourne for the ALP against the incumbent MP, Andrew Theophanous, who had resigned from the party in 2000 to sit as an independent, after he was charged with bribery offences in relation to visa and citizenship applications. She was the first woman born in Greece to serve in the federal parliament, and was re-elected on seven further occasions up to the 2022 federal election.

Vamvakinou served on numerous House and joint committees during her time in parliament. She had a long association with the Joint Standing Committee on Migration, serving two terms as chair (2010–2013, 2022–2025) and one as deputy chair (2013–2016). She was also chair of the House Standing Committee on Industry, Science and Innovation from 2008 to 2010, and served on the Speaker's panel from 2010 to 2013 and again from 2016 to 2025. She is a member of the ALP's Socialist Left faction. As of November 2023, she was co-chair of the Parliamentary Friends of Palestine.

On 9 June 2024, Vamvakinou announced that she would not re-contest her seat at the 2025 election. She endorsed her former adviser, Basem Abdo, a fellow member of the ALP Socialist Left faction, to replace her.

== Personal life ==
Vamvakinou is married to Dr Michalis S. Michael, and has two children. As of 2016 she lived in Northcote, outside her electorate.

Parliament of Australia
Preceded by Andrew Theophanous	Member for Calwell; 2001–2025	Succeeded by Basem Abdo
