= Kevin Andrews (politician) =

Australian politician (1955–2024)

The Honourable Kevin Andrews AM
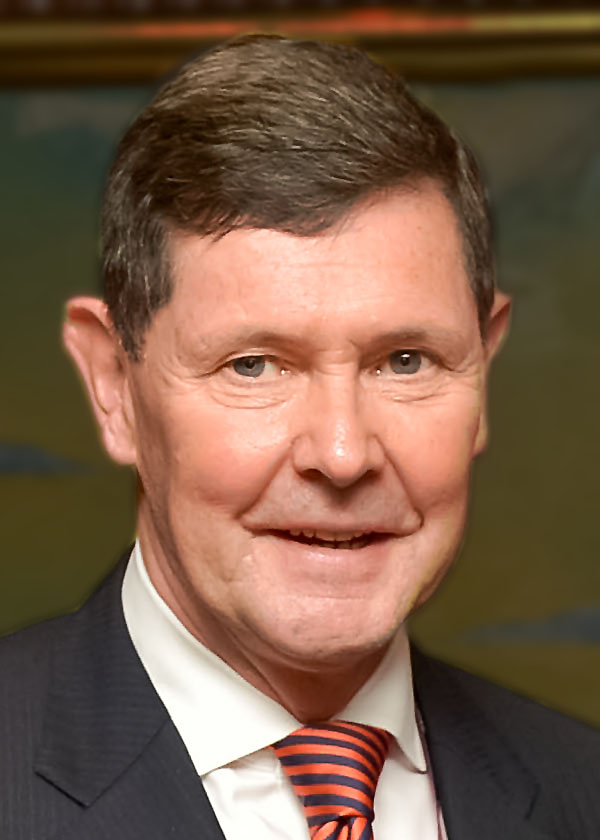
- Andrews in 2015

Father of the House
- In office 10 May 2016 – 11 April 2022
- Preceded by: Philip Ruddock
- Succeeded by: Bob Katter

Minister for Defence
- In office 23 December 2014 – 21 September 2015
- Prime Minister: Tony Abbott; Malcolm Turnbull
- Preceded by: David Johnston
- Succeeded by: Marise Payne

Minister for Social Services
- In office 18 September 2013 – 23 December 2014
- Prime Minister: Tony Abbott
- Preceded by: Jenny Macklin
- Succeeded by: Scott Morrison

Minister for Immigration and Citizenship
- In office 30 January 2007 – 3 December 2007
- Prime Minister: John Howard
- Preceded by: Amanda Vanstone
- Succeeded by: Chris Evans

Minister for Employment and Workplace Relations
- In office 7 October 2003 – 30 January 2007
- Prime Minister: John Howard
- Preceded by: Tony Abbott
- Succeeded by: Joe Hockey

Minister for Ageing
- In office 26 November 2001 – 7 October 2003
- Prime Minister: John Howard
- Preceded by: Bronwyn Bishop
- Succeeded by: Julie Bishop

Member of the Australian Parliament for Menzies
- In office 11 May 1991 – 11 April 2022
- Preceded by: Neil Brown
- Succeeded by: Keith Wolahan

Personal details
- Born: Kevin James Andrews; 9 November 1955 Sale, Victoria, Australia
- Died: 14 December 2024 (aged 69)
- Party: Liberal
- Spouse: Margaret Ryan
- Children: 5
- Education: University of Melbourne; Monash University
- Website: Official website

Kevin James Andrews AM (9 November 1955 – 14 December 2024) was an Australian politician. He was a member of the Liberal Party and served as a cabinet minister in the Howard and Abbott governments. He was a member of the House of Representatives from 1991 to 2022, representing the Victorian seat of Menzies.

Andrews was raised in Sale, Victoria. He studied arts and law at the University of Melbourne and worked as a barrister prior to entering politics, specialising in health law and bioethics. He was elected to parliament at the 1991 Menzies by-election and became known for his social conservatism. He was responsible for the private member's bill which became the Euthanasia Laws Act 1997, outlawing euthanasia in federal territories. Andrews became a senior figure in the Howard government, serving as Minister for Ageing (2001–2003), Employment and Workplace Relations (2003–2007), and Immigration and Citizenship (2007). He was appointed to cabinet in 2003 and as employment minister was responsible for the government's controversial WorkChoices reforms to industrial relations.

After the Coalition's defeat at the 2007 federal election, Andrews remained a senior figure in the Liberal Party's conservative faction. He played a key role in the 2009 Liberal leadership spill which saw Tony Abbott replace Malcolm Turnbull as party leader. He returned to cabinet under Abbott after Coalition returned to power at the 2013 election, serving as Minister for Social Services (2013–2014) and Defence (2014–2015). He was removed from cabinet after the 2015 leadership spill which saw Turnbull return as leader and replace Abbott as prime minister. He remained in parliament as a backbencher until his retirement at the 2022 election, having earlier been defeated for Liberal preselection by Keith Wolahan.

== Early life and education ==
Andrews was born on 9 November 1955 in Sale, Victoria, the son of Roy Gebhardt Andrews and Sheila Rosina O'Connor. He was educated at the Rosedale Primary School, St Patrick's College, Sale, and the University of Melbourne, where he resided at Newman College and graduated with a Bachelor of Laws in 1979 and a Bachelor of Arts in 1980. At university, he was president of the Newman College Students' Club and the National Association of Australian University Colleges. He later completed a Master of Laws degree at Monash University in 1986.

Andrews was a racing commentator in the 1970s and 80s, calling various sporting events including athletics, cycling and motor sports, and writing for a number of publications including Australian Auto Action. He was also secretary of the Melbourne University Athletics Club and a director of the Victorian Amateur Athletics Association. At Melbourne University, he trained with the legendary coach Franz Stampfl.

== Legal practice ==
After graduation, he worked for the Law Institute of Victoria from 1980 to 1983, as a research solicitor and co-ordinator of Continuing Legal Education. From 1983 to 1985, he served as associate to Sir James Gobbo, Justice of the Supreme Court of Victoria, and subsequently the Governor of Victoria. He practised as a barrister from 1985 until his election to Parliament in 1991.

While practising law Andrews specialised in health law and bioethics and was involved with the St Vincent's Bioethics Centre, the Mercy Hospital for Women, the Peter MacCallum Cancer Centre and the Lincoln School of Health Sciences. He was also a board member of Caritas Christi Hospice. In 1986, he represented the grandfather of a newborn infant with spina bifida in a case in the Supreme Court of Victoria, following allegations the Queen Victoria Hospital had attempted to withhold care. Judge Frank Vincent subsequently granted an order making the infant a ward of the court and mandating the hospital continue to provide treatyment, which was "believed to be the first time an Australian hospital has been forced to maintain the life of a person". Andrews was part of a group set up by Bob Santamaria to review family law act.

== Early political career ==
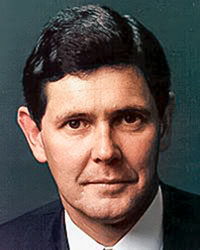
Andrews early in his career

Andrews was elected to the House of Representatives for the Liberal Party at the 1991 Menzies by-election in Victoria. Andrews has never lived in his electorate but in the neighbouring Jagajaga. He won Liberal preselection for Menzies against 25 other candidates.

Andrews was a member of the Lyons Forum, a socially conservative Christian group within the Coalition that was disbanded in the mid-1990s. Andrews served as the Forum Secretary and is credited with suggesting the name for the group.

Andrews was shadow minister for schools but was removed from the position when Alexander Downer replaced John Hewson as Liberal leader in May 1994.

== Howard government (1996–2007) ==
As a backbencher, Andrews chaired the House of Representatives Legal and Constitutional Affairs Committee. He presented a private member's bill, the Euthanasia Laws Bill 1996, which was passed in 1997 and overrode the Northern Territory's legislation, the Rights of the Terminally Ill Act 1995, that legalised euthanasia in the Territory.

Andrews called for an end to trials of the RU-486 drug, and voted against a bill in 2006 that took away the Health Minister's power to veto applications to allow the drug to be used.

In taking a stance against stem cell research in 2002, he stated that it was the "first time" that "human beings can be treated as a commodity". He also took a stance against stem cell research during a debate in 2006, which resulted in the overturning of a previous ban on the research.

After the Coalition's third victory in 2001, Andrews was brought into the outer ministry as Minister for Ageing, a portfolio in which he served from 26 November 2001 to 7 October 2003. He was subsequently appointed to Cabinet as the Minister for Employment and Workplace Relations and was responsible for introducing the Howard government's major changes to industrial relations law in 2005, commonly known as WorkChoices, which introduced a national system of workplace relations in Australia. In a reshuffle in early 2007, Andrews was made Minister for Immigration and Citizenship, a position which he held until the swearing-in of the First Rudd Ministry on 3 December 2007, following the defeat of the Howard government in the 2007 election.

== Opposition (2007–2013) ==
During 2008 and 2009, he served as Chairman of the Coalition's Policy Review Committee, reviewing and developing the Opposition's policies, until he was promoted to the Shadow Cabinet (to the position of Shadow Minister for Families, Housing and Human Services) in December 2009 by the newly elected Opposition Leader, Tony Abbott. He was also appointed Deputy Chairman of the Coalition Policy Development Committee.

In November 2009, Andrews declared his candidacy against Malcolm Turnbull in a vote for a leadership spill, in opposition to Turnbull's support for the government's emissions trading scheme. He had declared himself a climate change sceptic, saying that "the jury is still out" on human contributions to global warming. However, the partyroom voted down a leadership spill 41 votes to 35 and Andrews' challenge consequently did not eventuate. After continued leadership speculation, a second party room meeting was held, at which point the leadership was declared vacant. Tony Abbott, Joe Hockey, and Malcolm Turnbull all stood for the leadership, and Tony Abbott was ultimately successful. Following his election as Leader, Abbott promoted Andrews to the Shadow Cabinet as Minister for Families, Housing and Human Services.

At the 2010 federal election, Andrews was re-elected to the seat of Menzies with a 2.7-point swing against the Labor Party. He was subsequently re-elected in 2013, 2016 and 2019, becoming the "Father of the Parliament".

Andrews chaired the Joint Standing Committee on the National Disability Insurance Scheme, the Human Rights Sub-Committee of the Joint Standing Committee on Foreign Affairs, Defence and Trade, the Joint Select Committee on Australia's Family Law System, the Coalition Policy Committee on Foreign Affairs, Defence and Trade, and the Australia–China Parliamentary Friendship Group. He was also co-chair of the informal Parliamentary Friends of Hong Kong.

== Abbott government (2013–2015) ==
In the Abbott government, Andrews served as Minister for Social Services from September 2013 to December 2014. He was then Minister for Defence from December 2014 to September 2015.

On 14 September 2015, after Deputy Leader Julie Bishop announced she would support Malcolm Turnbull in challenge against Prime Minister Tony Abbott for the leadership of the Liberal Party, Andrews announced he supported Abbott and would stand for the deputy leadership against Bishop. Bishop retained the position of Deputy Liberal Leader with 70 votes to Andrews' 30. Upon the appointment of the Turnbull government Andrews was dropped from the new Ministry and moved to the backbench.

== Final years in parliament ==
With the retirement of Philip Ruddock at the 2016 federal election, Andrews became the Father of the House. Although Warren Snowdon was first elected in 1987, Andrews was the longest continuously serving member, because Snowdon was out of the House between 1996 and 1998. Andrews was one of three parliamentary survivors of the Hawke government, the others being Snowdon and Russell Broadbent. From 2019 until his retirement in 2022, Andrews was the "Father of the Parliament", the currently longest, continuously serving member of the Australian Parliament.

On 31 January 2021, Andrews lost the Liberal Party's endorsement in a preselection ballot to barrister Keith Wolahan (181 votes to 111). He retired at the 2022 election.

== Controversies ==
=== Haneef affair ===
As Minister for Immigration and Citizenship, Andrews attracted controversy after he revoked on character grounds the visa of Dr Muhamed Haneef, who had been granted bail on charges of aiding terrorists. This was criticised as a move to keep Haneef in detention; upon posting bail, Haneef would have been transferred from Brisbane's Wolston Correctional Centre to Sydney's Villawood Detention Centre. Andrews defended his actions as being in accordance with the Migration Act and Haneef's lawyers challenged his interpretation of the Act in the Federal Court.

Following the Director of Public Prosecutions dropping all charges against Haneef, Andrews refused calls to reinstate Haneef's visa, stating that his personal evidence was still valid. Andrews' refusal resulted in calls for a public inquiry into the incident by then Queensland Premier Peter Beattie.

Andrews' justification of his decision, that he had a reasonable suspicion that Haneef had associated with suspected terrorists and therefore failed the test of good character that a person must pass to keep a visa, was rejected in the Federal Court, and the revocation of Haneef's visa was overturned. However, in November, e-mails released under the Freedom of Information Act appeared to indicate that Andrews' office had a plan to revoke the visa before the case went to court, in the case that bail was granted.

On 23 December 2008, a government-ordered inquiry report was released. Mr. Clarke, the head of the judicial inquiry, determined Mr. Andrews did not act with an improper motive.

=== Publications record ===
Following Andrews' criticism of irregularities discovered in the CV of an Indian doctor working on the Gold Coast, various media organisations carried reports disputing Andrews' claim on parliamentary and ministerial websites to have co-authored three books, having contributed only a chapter to each. Andrews argued in his own defence that

"In common, everyday parlance, as one of the authors (of a chapter) I presumed you called yourself a co-author – that's all I've simply done. I wasn't aware, to be frank, of some publishing convention that someone's referred to (that suggests otherwise). If that offends people's sensibilities well so be it, basically."

=== 2007 African immigration controversy ===
During Andrews' tenure as immigration minister, he reacted to the murder of a young Sudanese-Australian man, Liep Gony, by stating "Some groups of immigrants aren't settling and adjusting into the Australian life as quickly as we would hope.", in reference to media suggestions Gony had been killed in "African gang violence". When it emerged that Gony had been murdered by two White Australians, Andrews declined to apologise, stating "I’m not proposing to apologise for saying what people are concerned about." In October 2007, Andrews' decision to cut Australia's refugee intake from African nations was described by some critics as racist and a use of the race card to appeal to "racist" voters before the 2007 Australian federal election.

The Queensland Labor Premier, Anna Bligh, described Andrews' criticism of Sudanese as "disturbing". She said: "It has been a long time since I have heard such a pure form of racism out of the mouth of any Australian politician." Labor politician Tony Burke described Andrews' decision as "incompetent". However, Andrews' actions were applauded by then former One Nation politician, Pauline Hanson. In addition members of the Australian community viewed Andrews as responsible for creating a racial tension leading to anti-African sentiment in the community and racially based attacks on Sudanese migrants in Australia. Andrews stated in 2011 he did not regret raising the issue.

=== Use of parliamentary entitlements ===
In February 2016, Andrews used $1,855 in taxpayer funds as part of approved "study allowance" to attend the US National "prayer breakfast" in Washington DC, a bipartisan annual event which is addressed by the President of the United States, address the Heritage Foundation, a right-wing think tank, about Australia's security policy, and have a series of policy discussion meetings in Washington DC and in the process missed the first week of Parliament, which had been approved by the party Whip.

=== Religious bakeries ===
In November 2017, Andrews advocated for "Jewish bakers" to have the legal right to refuse to bake cakes for Islamic weddings and the other way around.

== Causes and views ==
Andrews was a member of the National Right faction of the Liberal Party during the Morrison government.

Andrews was associated with, or gave speeches to, many organisations over the years. His most significant non-Parliamentary speeches are published in the volume One People One Destiny.

On 9 April 2003, Andrews made a speech to the Endeavour Forum, a conservative Christian group, founded to counter the feminist movement, which opposes abortion, equal opportunity and affirmative action.

Andrews was an adviser to the board of Life Decisions International (LDI), an anti-abortion group. He described his role with LDI as an "honorary patronage". In 2007, the Sydney Morning Herald reported that, on his entry in the Parliamentary Register of Pecuniary Interests, Andrews did not declare his wife's patronage of the board of advisors of Life Decisions International.

Andrews gave several speeches over the years at the Family Council of Victoria, an organisation opposed to homosexuality, sex-education, and anti-homophobia policies in public schools, which it claims is "pro-homosexual indoctrination" of students. He was a vocal public opponent of same-sex marriage and publicly stated he would vote against any bill, regardless of the results of the Australian Marriage Law Postal Survey. He abstained from voting for the bill to legalise same-sex marriage in the Australian Parliament.

Andrews supported immigration as a way to slow population ageing in Australia. During an address to the Committee for the Economic Development of Australia, he said that "The level of net overseas migration is important as net inflows of migrants to Australia reduce the rate of population ageing because migrants are younger on average than the resident population. Just under 70% of the migrant intake are in the 15–44 age cohort, compared to 43% of the Australian population as a whole. Just 10% of the migrant intake are 45 or over, compared with 38% of the Australian population."

In 2011, as a Liberal Shadow Cabinet frontbencher, Andrews published a critique of the Greens' policy agenda in Quadrant Magazine in which he wrote that the Australian Greens' "objective involves a radical transformation of the culture that underpins Western civilisation" and that their agenda would threaten the "Judeo-Christian/Enlightenment synthesis that upholds the individual" as well as "the economic system that has resulted in the creation of wealth and prosperity for the most people in human history."

Andrews supported the move to make Australia a republic at the Australian Constitutional Convention 1998.

Andrews was an adjunct lecturer in politics and in marriage education at the John Paul II Institute for Marriage and Family in Melbourne.

He long advocated the critical importance of Australia's reliance on natural resources. He is credited with suggesting the title of the Coalition's then pro-national resources interest group, the Monash Forum.

He served on many bodies in addition to serving in Parliament since 1991, including the Marriage Education Programme Inc, the Australian Association of Marriage Education, the Newman College council, the Institute for Social NeuroScience, and the council of the National Archives.

He published a policy journal, Australian Polity, from 2008 until his death.

== Personal life ==
Andrews was a Catholic.

Andrews was a keen cyclist, participating in many charitable rides, including the annual Pollie Pedal event, and competing in Masters racing. His youngest son, Ben, rode as a professional cyclist in Australia, on the Asian circuit, and in the kermesse series in Europe. Andrews' last book, Great Rivalries, is the story of cycling and the history of Italy from 1860 to 1960.

Andrews died on 14 December 2024, at the age of 69, after being diagnosed with cancer the previous year.

In the 2025 Australia Day Honours Andrews was posthumously appointed a Member of the Order of Australia (AM) for "significant service to the people and Parliament of Australia, to the Catholic Church, and to the community." A state funeral was held for Kevin Andrews after his death at St Patricks Cathedral Melbourne.

Parliament of Australia
Preceded by Neil Brown	Member for Menzies; 1991–2022	Succeeded by Keith Wolahan
Preceded by Philip Ruddock	Father of the House of Representatives; 2016–2022	Succeeded by Bob Katter
Preceded by Ian Macdonald	Father of the Parliament; 2019–2022	Succeeded by Bob Katter
Political offices
Preceded by David Johnston	Minister for Defence; 2014–2015	Succeeded by Marise Payne
Preceded by Jenny Macklin as Minister for Families, Community Services and Indigenous Affairs	Minister for Social Services; 2013–2014	Succeeded by Scott Morrison
Preceded by Amanda Vanstone	Minister for Immigration and Citizenship; 2007	Succeeded by Chris Evans
Preceded by Tony Abbott	Minister for Employment and Workplace Relations; 2003–2007	Succeeded by Joe Hockey
Preceded by Bronwyn Bishop as Minister for Aged Care	Minister for Ageing; 2001–2003	Succeeded by Julie Bishop
