= Keith Wolahan =

Australian politician (born 1977)

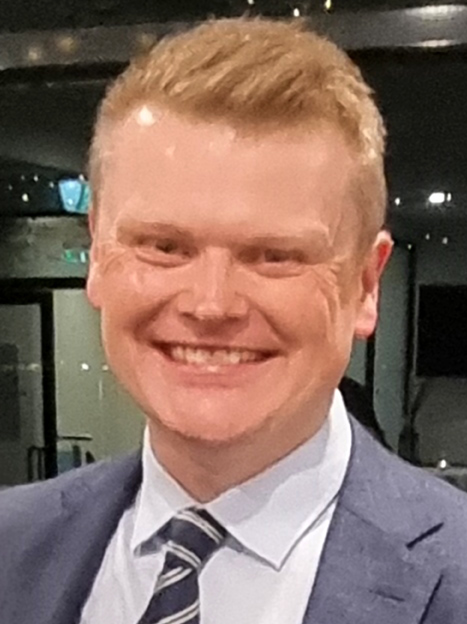
- Wolahan in 2023 at Beaumaris Motor Yacht Squadron

Member of the Australian Parliament for Menzies
- In office 21 May 2022 – 3 May 2025
- Preceded by: Kevin Andrews
- Succeeded by: Gabriel Ng

Personal details
- Born: Keith Wolahan; 30 September 1977 (age 49) Dublin, Ireland
- Party: Liberal
- Other political affiliations: Coalition
- Spouse: Sarah Weinberg
- Children: 2
- Education: University of Melbourne; Monash University; University of Cambridge
- Website: https://www.keithwolahan.com.au/

Military service
- Allegiance: Australia
- Branch/service: Australian Army Reserve; Australian Army
- Years of service: 1996–2014
- Rank: Captain
- Commands: 1st Commando Regiment
- Battles/wars: Battle of Same; War in Afghanistan
- Awards: Commendation for Distinguished Service

Keith Wolahan (born 30 September 1977) is an Australian former politician and member of the Victorian Bar. He represented the seat of Menzies in the House of Representatives for the Liberal Party from 2022 to 2025. Prior to entering politics, he was an Australian Army officer, serving three tours of Afghanistan as a commando officer, and also practised as a commercial barrister for twelve years.

== Early life ==
=== Family background ===
Wolahan was born in Dublin, Ireland, migrating to Australia with his parents and two brothers in 1988. He was educated at Ringwood Secondary College.

=== Education and legal career ===
Wolahan studied at the University of Melbourne where he graduated with Bachelor's degrees in Arts (Politics) and Commerce (Economics). He continued studying at Monash University, completing a Bachelor of Law (Honours). He was awarded the Sir Charles Lowe Moot Prize.

Wolahan began his career in law with the national firm, Mallesons Stephen Jacques where he specialised in mergers and acquisitions. In 2010 he became a barrister, specialising in commercial and consumer trials.

In 2013, Wolahan graduated from University of Cambridge with a master's degree in International Relations.

=== Military service ===
Wolahan joined the military while at University, eventually joining 2 Commando Company, 1st Commando Regiment. Wolahan was promoted to Captain in 2004 and saw several periods of active service, including four postings overseas with 2 Commando:

- East Timor 2007 for six months as the Special Operations Liaison Officer for the Apprehension Task Group during the Battle of Same.
- Afghanistan 2008 for six months as the Operations Officer with the Special Operations Task Group HQ in Kandahar.
- Afghanistan 2009–10 for six months as a Platoon Commander within the Special Operations Task Group HQ based in Tarinkot.
- Afghanistan 2014 embedded as the Deputy Chief of Operations with a United States Special Operations Command task force based in Bagram.

Wolahan lost two friends in the War in Afghanistan: Marcus Case and Greg Sher. He joined two other Afghanistan veterans in the 47th Parliament of Australia: Andrew Hastie and Phillip Thompson.

== Political career ==
=== Preselection ===
Wolahan defeated the sitting member Kevin Andrews in a preselection contest, 181 votes to 111. Andrews entered the contest with written endorsements from then Treasurer Josh Frydenberg, and Prime Minister Scott Morrison. It was the first time a sitting Victorian Liberal MP had been ousted by their members in more than 20 years.

=== 2022 election ===
The 2022 federal election saw a 6% swing against the Liberals in Menzies. One of the contributing factors was a large swing in suburbs with higher proportions of Chinese ancestry, including Box Hill and Doncaster.

=== 47th Parliament ===
Wolahan was a member of the House Economics and Joint Standing National Anti-Corruption Commission Committees. He also served as the Deputy Chair of The Joint Select Committee on the Aboriginal and Torres Strait Islander Voice Referendum.

=== 2025 election ===
Following a redistribution that shifted Menzies’ margin from a 50.7% Liberal seat to a notionally 50.4% Labor seat, the 2025 federal election delivered a -0.62% two-party preferred swing to Labor in Menzies, resulting in Labor gaining the seat with just over 51% of the two-party preferred vote. He was defeated by Gabriel Ng of the Labor Party.

== Post-politics ==
Just weeks after his 2025 defeat, media reported that Wolahan had been successfully re-admitted to practice at the Victorian Bar.

== Personal life ==
Wolahan married Sarah Weinberg at Heide Museum of Modern Art in Bulleen. They have two children, Leo and Eva.

== Honours and awards ==
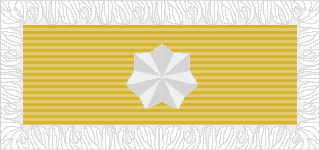

	Commendation for Distinguished Service	Awarded in 2011 Australia Day Honours for service in Afghanistan.
Ribbon of the AASM	Australian Active Service Medal	With clasp for East Timor
Ribbon of the Afghanistan Medal for Australia	Afghanistan Medal	Operation SLIPPER
Ribbon of the Australian Service Medal	Australian Service Medal	With clasp for CT/SR (Counter Terrorism / Special Recovery)
Ribbon of the ADM	Australian Defence Medal	
	NATO Medal for the Non-Article 5 ISAF Operation in Afghanistan	With clasp ISAF
Meritorious Unit Citation	Meritorious Unit Citation with Federation Star	Awarded to Task Force 66 in the 2015 Australia Day Honours
	Infantry Combat Badge	
	Timor Leste Solidarity Medal	(East Timor)

Parliament of Australia
Preceded by Kevin Andrews	Member for Menzies; 2022–2025	Succeeded by Gabriel Ng
