= Gabriel Ng =

Australian politician

Gabriel Ng MP
- 黄嘉博

Member of the Australian Parliament for Menzies
- Incumbent
- Assumed office 3 May 2025
- Preceded by: Keith Wolahan

Personal details
- Party: Labor
- Children: 2
- Occupation: Politician
- Website: alp.org.au/our-people/our-people/gabriel-ng/

Gabriel James Ng is an Australian politician. He is the member of the House of Representatives for the Australian Labor Party representing the Division of Menzies. He was elected at the 2025 Australian federal election defeating the incumbent member Keith Wolahan. He is the first Labor Member for Menzies.

== Personal life ==
Ng grew up in Doncaster, and he lives in the local area with his wife and two children. He is of Chinese-Singaporean descent. He is a lawyer and worked in the public service for a number of years. He attended school at Trinity Grammar School in Kew.

Parliament of Australia
Preceded by Keith Wolahan	Member for Menzies; 2025–present	Incumbent
