= Basem Abdo =

Australian politician

Basem Abdo MP
- باسم عبده
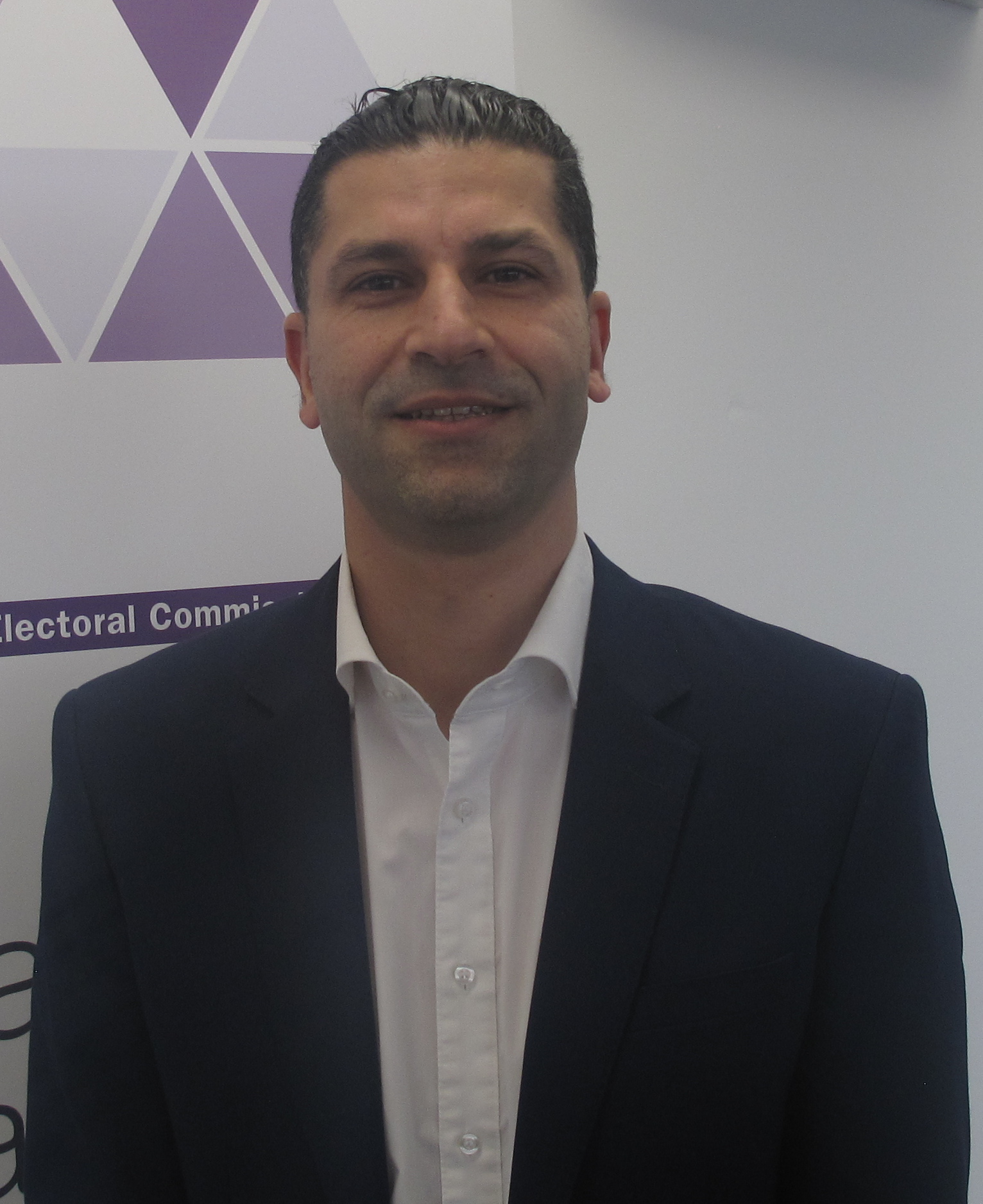
- Abdo in 2025

Member of the Australian Parliament for Calwell
- Incumbent
- Assumed office 3 May 2025
- Preceded by: Maria Vamvakinou

Personal details
- Born: Basem Jamal Abdo; 3 June 1987 (age 39) Kuwait
- Citizenship: Australian (from 1994); Jordanian (until 2023)
- Party: Labor
- Spouse: Natascha
- Education: Gladstone Park Secondary College

Basem Jamal Abdo (Arabic: باسم جمال عبده, born 3 June 1987) is an Australian politician who serves as a member of the Australian House of Representatives representing the Division of Calwell. He was elected in the 2025 election as a member of the Australian Labor Party. The son of Palestinian refugees, Abdo is the first Palestinian Arab to serve in the Parliament of Australia.

== Early life ==
Basem Abdo was born in Kuwait to Palestinian refugees. His father fled his village in the West Bank during the Six-Day War. Their family sought refuge in Jordan during the Gulf War and moved to Australia in 1991. His father was trained as an electrical engineer, but was unable to find employment in Australia as an electrical engineer.

Abdo graduated from Gladstone Park Secondary College and is a qualified teacher. He married Natascha and is a Muslim.

== Career ==
Abdo worked as an advisor for Maria Vamvakinou, a member of the Australian House of Representatives. He is a member of the Australian Labor Party (ALP) and is aligned with the Labor Left faction of the party.

For the 2025 federal election Abdo was selected to succeed Vamvakinou as the ALP's candidate in the Division of Calwell and defeated twelve other candidates for the seat. Vamvakinou endorsed Abdo and Calwell has been held by Labor since its creation in 1984. 23.8% of the population of the Division of Calwell is Muslim, one of the highest for any Australian electorate. Abdo is the first member of the Parliament of Australia to be of Palestinian Arab descent.

== Political positions ==
Abdo supports increasing the minimum wage.

Abdo is an advocate for Palestinian statehood.

Abdo is a member of the Australian Manufacturing Workers Union and the Community and Public Sector Union

Parliament of Australia
Preceded by Maria Vamvakinou	Member for Calwell; 2025–present	Incumbent
