= Division of Menzies =

Australian federal electoral division

Coordinates: 37.763°S 145.191°E

Menzies Australian House of Representatives Division
- Interactive map of electorate boundaries from the 2025 federal election
- Created: 1984
- MP: Gabriel Ng
- Party: Labor
- Namesake: Sir Robert Menzies
- Electors: 121,052 (2025)
- Area: 102 km^{2} (39.4 sq mi)
- Demographic: Outer metropolitan

The Division of Menzies is an Australian Electoral Division in the state of Victoria. The division is located in the north-eastern suburbs of Melbourne and covers parts of City of Manningham and to a smaller extent, City of Whitehorse.

== History ==
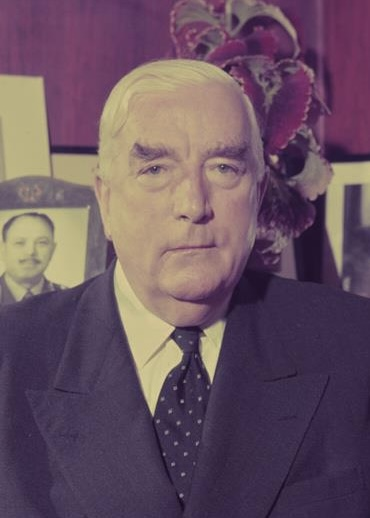
Sir Robert Menzies, the division's namesake

The Division was proclaimed at the redistribution of 14 September 1984, and was first contested at the 1984 election. The division was named after Sir Robert Menzies, the longest serving Prime Minister of Australia, who represented the neighbouring division of Kooyong during his time in office.

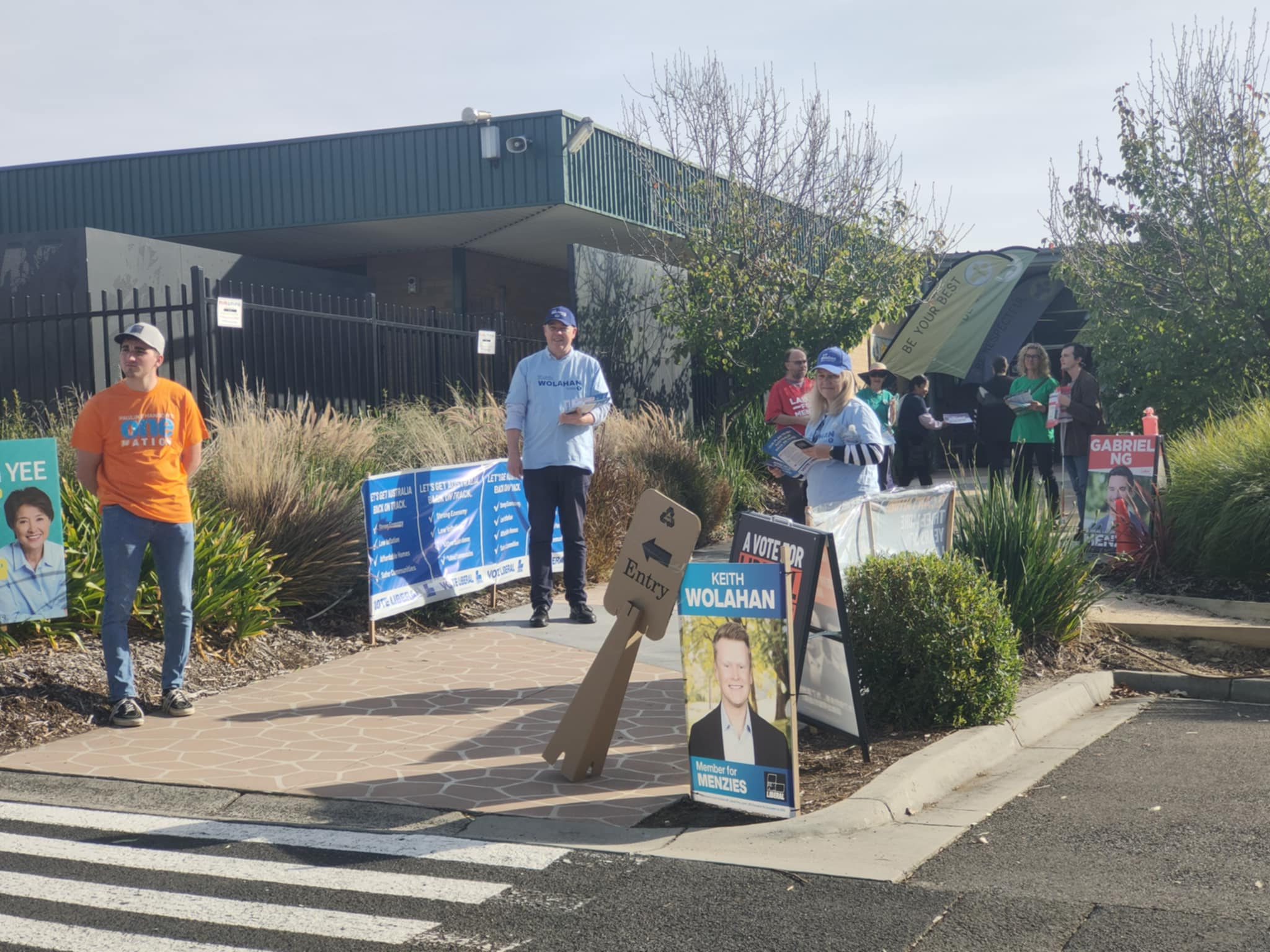
A polling booth in Menzies at the 2025 federal election

The Division had always been a fairly safe to safe Liberal seat since creation. It was first held by Neil Brown, a former minister who served in the Fraser government and who also served as deputy Liberal leader under John Howard from 1985 to 1987. Brown retired in 1991 and was replaced by Kevin Andrews, who held the seat for 31 years, from 1991 to 2022. Andrews was the Father of the House, with the longest continuous tenure of any then current MHR—although Warren Snowdon and Russell Broadbent were first elected earlier. Andrews lost party pre-selection to Keith Wolahan prior to the 2022 Australian federal election. In the election, the Liberal Party nearly lost the seat for the first time in its history, with Wolahan winning the seat with a 0.7% two-party preferred margin. The swing against the party was attributed to backlash against the Morrison Government by Chinese Australians.

The 2024 redistribution and accompanying boundary changes erased the Liberal majority and made Menzies a notional Labor seat with a 0.4% margin. Wolahan needed a swing in his favour in order to be re-elected in the subsequent 2025 federal election. At the election, Wolahan was defeated by Labor candidate Gabriel Ng, who picked up a small swing in his favour amid the Liberals' collapse in urban seats. Ng is the first Labor member ever to win the seat.

== Boundaries ==
Since 1984, federal electoral division boundaries in Australia have been determined at redistributions by a redistribution committee appointed by the Australian Electoral Commission. Redistributions occur for the boundaries of divisions in a particular state, and they occur every seven years, or sooner if a state's representation entitlement changes or when divisions of a state are malapportioned.

When the division was created in 1984, it replaced majority of the abolished Division of Diamond Valley, covering areas like Templestowe, Bulleen, Doncaster and Eltham. In 1989, it lost all areas north of Yarra River (such as Eltham) to the Division of Jagajaga, while it gained Ivanhoe East and Eaglemont to the west, and Donvale to the south-east. In 1994, the division was doubled in area when it gained areas to the east. It also lost the Ivanhoe East and Eaglemont areas (which were gained five years prior) and became co-extensive with the boundaries of the new City of Manningham. Since then until 2018, the division's boundaries remained roughly similar with only minor boundary changes in subsequent redistributions, and the division continued to share most or all of its boundaries with the City of Manningham boundaries.

The division used to be bordered by Koonung Creek / Eastern Freeway to the south between from its creation in 1984 until 2021. In 2021, the division crossed the creek and the freeway into City of Whitehorse, and expanded southwards up to Whitehorse Road at Box Hill. In 2024, the division was expanded southwards a second time up to the suburb of Box Hill South, stopping short of Burwood Highway.

The division is also bordered by the Yarra River to the north between 1989 and 2018, and since 2024. In 2018, the division crossed the Yarra River and expanded to include Eltham, Research, Kangaroo Ground and North Warrandyte from Jagajaga. These areas were within the division only briefly, with most of these areas (except North Warrandyte) lost to Jagajaga in 2021 and North Warrandyte lost to Jagajaga in 2024. As a result, since 2024, the division is again bordered by the Yarra River to the north, between Bulleen and North Warrandyte.

In the 2024 redistribution, other than the southern expansion to Box Hill South and loss of North Warrandyte as described above, the division also no longer covered the entirety of City of Manningham and no longer included suburbs such as Wonga Park and Donvale. It also lost areas in the north-east areas of City of Whitehorse, such as Mitcham and Nundawading, which had only been gained in 2021. All these areas were transferred to the Division of Deakin.

As of the 2024 redistribution, it covers the suburbs of Box Hill, Box Hill North, Bulleen, Doncaster, Doncaster East, Donvale, Mont Albert, Mont Albert North, Templestowe, Templestowe Lower and Warrandyte. Additionally, parts of Balwyn North, Box Hill South, Blackburn, Blackburn North, Blackburn South, Park Orchards, Surrey Hills and Warrandyte South fall under the Division.

== Demographics ==
The Division of Menzies has a diverse population, with around 45% of its residents being born overseas. Half of the population speak a language other than English at home, with Chinese Australians making around 27% of the population. The seat has the third largest Chinese community of any electorate in all of Australia and the second largest in Victoria after neighbouring Chisholm.

== Members ==
Image	Member	Party	Term	Notes
	Neil Brown (1940–)	Liberal	1 December 1984 – 25 February 1991	Previously held the Division of Diamond Valley. Resigned to retire from politics
	Kevin Andrews (1955–2024)	Liberal	11 May 1991 – 11 April 2022	Served as minister under Howard and Abbott. Lost preselection and retired
	Keith Wolahan (1977–)	Liberal	21 May 2022 – 3 May 2025	Lost seat
	Gabriel Ng (1982–)	Labor	3 May 2025 – present	Incumbent

== Election results ==
2025 Australian federal election: Menzies
Party	Candidate	Votes	%	±%
Liberal	Keith Wolahan	44,473	40.64	−0.30
Labor	Gabriel Ng	38,012	34.74	+2.94
Greens	Bill Pheasant	11,998	10.96	−1.94
Independent	Stella Yee	6,966	6.37	+6.37
Trumpet of Patriots	Amanda Paliouras	2,708	2.47	+1.67
One Nation	Jhett Edwards-Scott	2,152	1.97	+0.01
Family First	Ann Seeley	1,759	1.61	+1.61
Libertarian	Joshua Utoyo	1,362	1.24	−1.81
Total formal votes		109,430	96.03	−0.54
Informal votes		4,523	3.97	+0.54
Turnout		113,953	94.18	+0.45
Two-party-preferred result
Labor	Gabriel Ng	55,894	51.08	+0.66
Liberal	Keith Wolahan	53,536	48.92	−0.66
Labor notional hold		Swing	+0.66	
