= Laff =

Laff or LAFF may refer to:

== Film and TV ==
- Laff (TV network), a comedy-oriented digital multicast television network
- Laff-A-Lympics, an American cartoon TV series
- Latin American Film Festival, an annual film festival held in Utrecht, Netherlands
- London Australian Film Festival, an annual film festival held in London, England
- Los Angeles Film Festival, an annual film festival held in Westwood, Los Angeles, California, U.S.

== Other uses ==
- Laff Records, an independent record label
- The Laff Stop, a comedy club in Houston, Texas, U.S.
- Latin American Fisheries Fellowship, a program at the Bren School of Environmental Science & Management

== See also ==
- Laffer (disambiguation)
- Laughter (disambiguation)
