= Results of the 2022 Australian federal election in New South Wales =

Federal election results in New South Wales, Australia

2022 Australian federal election (New South Wales)
← 2019	21 May 2022	2025 →

All 47 New South Wales seats in the Australian House of Representatives and 6 seats in the Australian Senate
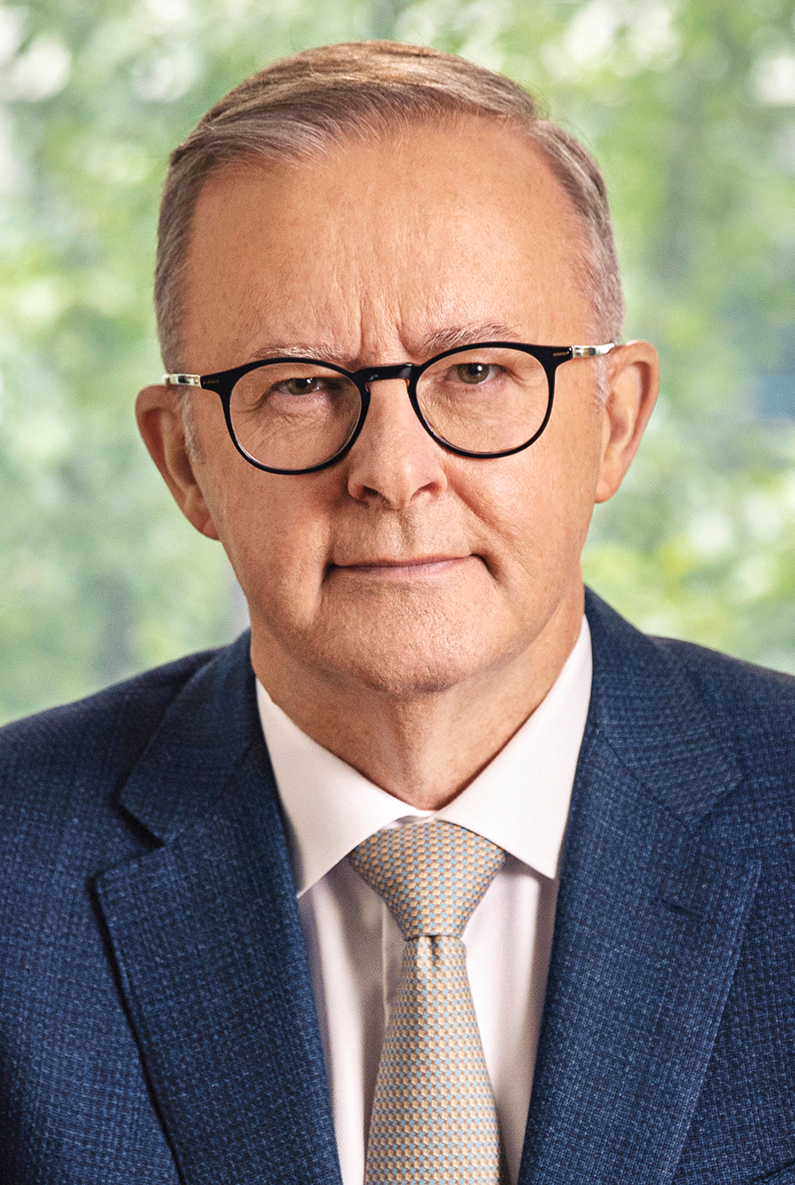

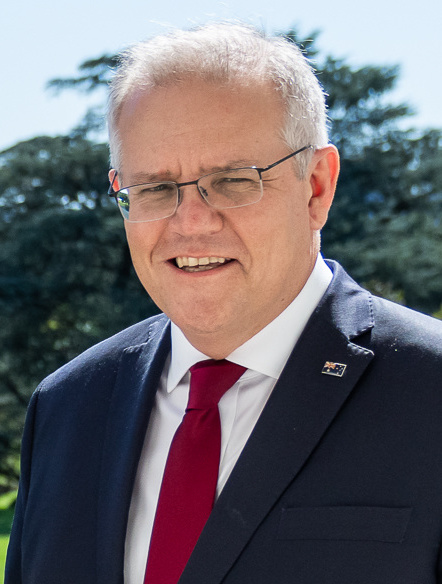
	First party	Second party
Leader	Anthony Albanese	Scott Morrison
Party	Labor	Liberal/National coalition
Last election	24 seats	22 seats
Seats won	26	16
Seat change	▲2	▼6
Popular vote	1,552,684	1,699,324
Percentage	33.38%	36.54%
Swing	▼1.18	▼6.01
TPP	51.42%	48.58%
TPP swing	▲3.20	▼3.20
- Results by division for the House of Representatives, shaded by winning party's margin of victory.

This is a list of electoral division results for the 2022 Australian federal election in the state of New South Wales.

This election was held using Instant-runoff voting (often referred to locally as preferential voting), a form of ranked voting where voters order candidates in order of preference. The number of first preferences for each candidate is first counted, and then the candidate with the lowest number of votes is eliminated and their votes are each transferred to the remaining candidate which they gave the highest preference to. This process of eliminating and transferring the votes of the last-placed remaining candidates is repeated until there are only two candidates left, at which point the candidate with more votes (including those transferred) wins. This can mean that a candidate who does not have the most first preferences can be elected if no candidate takes majority of votes in the first count and that candidate accumulates enough transferred votes to overtake the original leader.

In this election there were seven such reversals in New South Wales—Labor won three seats where the Liberal candidate had the most first preferences (Bennelong, Gilmore and Robertson), and independent candidates won four seats where the Liberals or Labor had the most first preferences (Labor in Fowler and the Liberals in Mackellar, North Sydney and Wentworth).

== Overall results ==
House of Representatives (IRV) – Turnout 90.63% (CV)
Party	Votes	%	Swing (pp)	Seats	Change (seats)
Liberal Party of Australia	1,316,134	28.30	−4.49	9	▼6
National Party of Australia	383,189	8.24	−1.52	7	0
Liberal/National Coalition	1,699,324	36.54	−6.01	16	▼6
Australian Labor Party	1,552,684	33.38	−1.18	26	▲2
Australian Greens	466,069	10.02	+1.31	0	Steady
Pauline Hanson's One Nation	224,965	4.84	+3.53	0	Steady
United Australia Party	183,174	3.94	+0.56	0	Steady
Liberal Democratic Party	96,898	2.08	+1.65	0	Steady
Animal Justice Party	16,979	0.37	−0.29	0	Steady
Shooters, Fishers and Farmers Party	14,727	0.32	−0.08	0	Steady
Informed Medical Options Party	14,171	0.30	+0.27	0	Steady
Fusion	8,520	0.18	+0.18	0	Steady
Indigenous-Aboriginal Party of Australia	7,326	0.16	+0.16	0	Steady
Sustainable Australia	3,423	0.07	−0.53	0	Steady
Australian Federation Party	2,647	0.06	+0.06	0	Steady
Australian Citizens Party	2,372	0.05	+0.05	0	Steady
TNL	1,704	0.04	+0.04	0	Steady
Socialist Alliance	1,518	0.03	+0.03	0	Steady
Drew Pavlou Democratic Alliance	1,208	0.03	+0.03	0	Steady
Australian Democrats	651	0.01	+0.01	0	Steady
Independent	351,620	7.56	+2.94	5	▲4
Non Affiliated	961	0.02	+0.02	0	Steady
Total	4,650,940	100.00		47	Steady
Invalid/blank votes	308,644	6.22	−0.79	–	–
Turnout	4,959,584	90.70	−1.46	–	–
Registered voters	5,467,993	–	–	–	–
Two-party-preferred vote
Labor	2,391,301	51.42	+3.20		
Liberal/National Coalition	2,259,639	48.58	−3.20		
Source: AEC for both and

== Results by division ==
=== Banks ===
2022 Australian federal election: Banks
Party	Candidate	Votes	%	±%
Liberal	David Coleman	41,622	45.22	−5.70
Labor	Zhi Soon	32,459	35.26	−1.09
Greens	Natalie Hanna	8,063	8.76	+2.94
United Australia	Marika Momircevski	5,048	5.48	+3.27
One Nation	Malcolm Heffernan	2,628	2.86	+2.86
Liberal Democrats	Elouise Cocker	1,264	1.37	+1.37
	Steve Khouw	961	1.04	+1.04
Total formal votes		92,045	93.36	+0.56
Informal votes		6,550	6.64	−0.56
Turnout		98,595	91.55	−1.48
Two-party-preferred result
Liberal	David Coleman	48,969	53.20	−3.06
Labor	Zhi Soon	43,076	46.80	+3.06
Liberal hold		Swing	−3.06	

Alluvial diagram for preference flows in the seat of Banks in the 2022 federal election. indicates at what stage the winning candidate had over 50% of the votes and was declared the winner.

=== Barton ===
2022 Australian federal election: Barton
Party	Candidate	Votes	%	±%
Labor	Linda Burney	46,206	50.43	+1.24
Liberal	John Goody	23,992	26.19	−7.30
Greens	Taylor Vandijk	11,441	12.49	+3.46
United Australia	Dimitri Honos	5,611	6.12	+3.83
One Nation	Phillip Pollard	4,373	4.77	+1.11
Total formal votes		91,623	92.52	+2.05
Informal votes		7,405	7.48	−2.05
Turnout		99,028	89.72	−1.46
Two-party-preferred result
Labor	Linda Burney	60,054	65.54	+6.13
Liberal	John Goody	31,569	34.46	−6.13
Labor hold		Swing	+6.13	

Alluvial diagram for preference flows in the seat of Barton in the 2022 federal election. The winning candidate got over 50% of first preference votes, so this alluvial diagram is indicative only, and preference flows were not used to determine the final result. The preference flows were used to determine the two-candidate-preferred.

=== Bennelong ===
2022 Australian federal election: Bennelong
Party	Candidate	Votes	%	±%
Liberal	Simon Kennedy	41,206	41.35	−9.47
Labor	Jerome Laxale	37,596	37.73	+3.70
Greens	Tony Adams	11,395	11.44	+1.97
United Australia	Rhys Collyer	2,915	2.93	+0.97
Fusion	John August	2,125	2.13	+2.13
One Nation	Victor Waterson	1,664	1.67	+1.67
Liberal Democrats	Dougal Cameron	1,539	1.54	+1.54
Democratic Alliance	Kyinzom Dhongdue	1,208	1.21	+1.21
Total formal votes		99,648	94.20	−0.64
Informal votes		6,130	5.80	+0.64
Turnout		105,778	92.03	−1.29
Two-party-preferred result
Labor	Jerome Laxale	50,801	50.98	+7.89
Liberal	Simon Kennedy	48,847	49.02	−7.89
Labor gain from Liberal		Swing	+7.89	

Alluvial diagram for preference flows in the seat of Bennelong in the 2022 federal election. indicates at what stage the winning candidate had over 50% of the votes and was declared the winner.

=== Berowra ===
2022 Australian federal election: Berowra
Party	Candidate	Votes	%	±%
Liberal	Julian Leeser	45,797	49.08	−8.12
Labor	Benson Koschinski	20,746	22.23	+1.13
Greens	Tania Salitra	14,536	15.58	+3.70
One Nation	Rhiannon Bosma	2,972	3.19	+3.19
United Australia	Christopher Martinic	2,315	2.48	+0.80
Liberal Democrats	Nicholas Samios	2,307	2.47	+2.47
Independent	Benjamin Caswell	1,802	1.93	+1.93
Fusion	Brendan Clarke	1,418	1.52	+1.52
Independent	Roger Woodward	904	0.97	+0.44
Federation	David Louie	509	0.55	+0.55
Total formal votes		93,306	93.88	+0.28
Informal votes		6,083	6.12	−0.28
Turnout		99,389	93.61	−0.78
Two-party-preferred result
Liberal	Julian Leeser	55,771	59.77	−5.88
Labor	Benson Koschinski	37,535	40.23	+5.88
Liberal hold		Swing	−5.88	

Alluvial diagram for preference flows in the seat of Berowra in the 2022 federal election. indicates at what stage the winning candidate had over 50% of the votes and was declared the winner.

=== Blaxland ===
2022 Australian federal election: Blaxland
Party	Candidate	Votes	%	±%
Labor	Jason Clare	44,905	54.98	−2.80
Liberal	Oz Guney	22,059	27.01	−1.81
Greens	Linda Eisler	5,187	6.35	+0.99
United Australia	Elvis Sinosic	5,105	6.25	+3.37
One Nation	Adam Stepanoff	4,421	5.41	+5.41
Total formal votes		81,677	89.21	+2.51
Informal votes		9,884	10.79	−2.51
Turnout		91,561	85.37	−3.08
Two-party-preferred result
Labor	Jason Clare	53,039	64.94	+0.22
Liberal	Oz Guney	28,638	35.06	−0.22
Labor hold		Swing	+0.22	

Alluvial diagram for preference flows in the seat of Blaxland in the 2022 federal election. The winning candidate got over 50% of first preference votes, so this alluvial diagram is indicative only, and preference flows were not used to determine the final result. The preference flows were used to determine the two-candidate-preferred.

=== Bradfield ===
2022 Australian federal election: Bradfield
Party	Candidate	Votes	%	±%
Liberal	Paul Fletcher	43,562	45.05	−15.28
Independent	Nicolette Boele	20,198	20.89	+20.89
Labor	David Brigden	16,902	17.48	−3.70
Greens	Martin Cousins	8,960	9.27	−4.44
Independent	Janine Kitson	3,018	3.12	+3.12
United Australia	Rob Fletcher	2,496	2.58	+0.74
One Nation	Michael Lowe	1,568	1.62	+1.62
Total formal votes		96,704	96.40	+0.45
Informal votes		3,616	3.60	−0.45
Turnout		100,320	92.43	−0.95
Notional two-party-preferred count
Liberal	Paul Fletcher	54,685	56.55	−10.01
Labor	David Brigden	42,019	43.45	+10.01
Two-candidate-preferred result
Liberal	Paul Fletcher	52,447	54.23	−12.33
Independent	Nicolette Boele	44,257	45.77	+45.77
Liberal hold				

Alluvial diagram for preference flows in the seat of Bradfield in the 2022 federal election. indicates at what stage the winning candidate had over 50% of the votes and was declared the winner.

=== Calare ===
2022 Australian federal election: Calare
Party	Candidate	Votes	%	±%
National	Andrew Gee	51,161	47.67	+2.96
Independent	Kate Hook	21,891	20.40	+20.40
Labor	Sarah Elliott	16,252	15.14	−6.99
One Nation	Stacey Whittaker	9,057	8.44	+8.44
Greens	Kay Nankervis	4,891	4.56	−1.50
United Australia	Adam Jannis	4,067	3.79	+0.56
Total formal votes		107,319	96.01	+1.67
Informal votes		4,455	3.99	−1.67
Turnout		111,774	92.06	−1.54
Notional two-party-preferred count
National	Andrew Gee	70,245	65.45	+2.16
Labor	Sarah Elliott	37,074	34.55	−2.16
Two-candidate-preferred result
National	Andrew Gee	64,047	59.68	−3.61
Independent	Kate Hook	43,272	40.32	+40.32
National hold				

Alluvial diagram for preference flows in the seat of Calare in the 2022 federal election. indicates at what stage the winning candidate had over 50% of the votes and was declared the winner.

=== Chifley ===
2022 Australian federal election: Chifley
Party	Candidate	Votes	%	±%
Labor	Ed Husic	51,236	52.72	−1.58
Liberal	Jugandeep Singh	24,046	24.74	−3.18
One Nation	Amit Batish	6,034	6.21	+6.21
Greens	Sujan Selventhiran	5,622	5.78	+0.72
United Australia	Zvetanka Raskov	5,149	5.30	+0.76
Liberal Democrats	Ben Roughley	3,263	3.36	+3.36
Independent	Ammar Khan	1,839	1.89	+0.15
Total formal votes		97,189	91.12	+0.78
Informal votes		9,471	8.88	−0.78
Turnout		106,660	87.95	−2.01
Two-party-preferred result
Labor	Ed Husic	61,682	63.47	+1.10
Liberal	Jugandeep Singh	35,507	36.53	−1.10
Labor hold		Swing	+1.10	

Alluvial diagram for preference flows in the seat of Chifley in the 2022 federal election. The winning candidate got over 50% of first preference votes, so this alluvial diagram is indicative only, and preference flows were not used to determine the final result. The preference flows were used to determine the two-candidate-preferred.

=== Cook ===
2022 Australian federal election: Cook
Party	Candidate	Votes	%	±%
Liberal	Scott Morrison	54,322	55.53	−8.17
Labor	Simon Earle	24,444	24.99	+1.89
Greens	Catherine Dyson	9,685	9.90	+3.09
One Nation	Gaye Cameron	4,985	5.10	+1.61
United Australia	Jacqueline Guinane	4,381	4.48	+3.27
Total formal votes		97,817	95.60	+1.73
Informal votes		4,498	4.40	−1.73
Turnout		102,315	92.83	−0.82
Two-party-preferred result
Liberal	Scott Morrison	61,080	62.44	−6.58
Labor	Simon Earle	36,737	37.56	+6.58
Liberal hold		Swing	−6.58	

Alluvial diagram for preference flows in the seat of Cook in the 2022 federal election. The winning candidate got over 50% of first preference votes, so this alluvial diagram is indicative only, and preference flows were not used to determine the final result. The preference flows were used to determine the two-candidate-preferred.

=== Cowper ===
2022 Australian federal election: Cowper
Party	Candidate	Votes	%	±%
National	Pat Conaghan	43,909	39.47	−7.60
Independent	Caz Heise	29,206	26.26	+26.26
Labor	Keith McMullen	15,566	13.99	+0.20
One Nation	Faye Aspiotis	9,047	8.13	+8.13
Greens	Timothy Nott	6,518	5.86	−0.08
Liberal Democrats	Simon Chaseling	4,316	3.88	+3.88
United Australia	Joshua Fairhall	2,674	2.40	−0.62
Total formal votes		111,236	95.07	+2.85
Informal votes		5,770	4.93	−2.85
Turnout		117,006	90.22	−1.81
Notional two-party-preferred count
National	Pat Conaghan	66,153	59.47	−2.41
Labor	Keith McMullen	45,083	40.53	+2.41
Two-candidate-preferred result
National	Pat Conaghan	58,204	52.32	−4.47
Independent	Caz Heise	53,032	47.68	+47.68
National hold				

Alluvial diagram for preference flows in the seat of Cowper in the 2022 federal election. indicates at what stage the winning candidate had over 50% of the votes and was declared the winner.

=== Cunningham ===
2022 Australian federal election: Cunningham
Party	Candidate	Votes	%	±%
Labor	Alison Byrnes	40,783	40.11	−6.50
Liberal	Marcus Uren	25,418	25.00	−5.97
Greens	Dylan Green	22,011	21.65	+6.56
One Nation	Thomas Grogan	5,218	5.13	+5.13
United Australia	Ben Britton	4,936	4.85	+1.05
Liberal Democrats	Michael Glover	2,207	2.17	+2.17
Citizens	Alexis Garnaut-Miller	1,098	1.08	+1.08
Total formal votes		101,671	94.86	+0.56
Informal votes		5,514	5.14	−0.56
Turnout		107,185	91.48	−1.17
Two-party-preferred result
Labor	Alison Byrnes	65,783	64.70	+1.29
Liberal	Marcus Uren	35,888	35.30	−1.29
Labor hold		Swing	+1.29	

Alluvial diagram for preference flows in the seat of Cunningham in the 2022 federal election. indicates at what stage the winning candidate had over 50% of the votes and was declared the winner.

=== Dobell ===
2022 Australian federal election: Dobell
Party	Candidate	Votes	%	±%
Labor	Emma McBride	43,595	42.86	+1.37
Liberal	Michael Feneley	34,276	33.70	−7.03
Greens	Cath Connor	8,700	8.55	+1.08
One Nation	Martin Stevenson	7,583	7.45	+7.45
United Australia	Dean Mackin	3,818	3.75	−1.58
Fusion	Geoff Barnes	2,202	2.16	+2.16
Liberal Democrats	Eliot Metherell	1,543	1.52	+1.52
Total formal votes		101,717	95.38	+1.35
Informal votes		4,930	4.62	−1.35
Turnout		106,647	90.07	−1.98
Two-party-preferred result
Labor	Emma McBride	57,491	56.52	+5.02
Liberal	Michael Feneley	44,226	43.48	−5.02
Labor hold		Swing	+5.02	

Alluvial diagram for preference flows in the seat of Dobell in the 2022 federal election. indicates at what stage the winning candidate had over 50% of the votes and was declared the winner.

=== Eden-Monaro ===
2022 Australian federal election: Eden-Monaro
Party	Candidate	Votes	%	±%
Labor	Kristy McBain	43,215	42.57	+3.40
Liberal	Jerry Nockles	33,520	33.02	−3.99
Greens	Vivian Harris	9,376	9.24	+0.46
One Nation	Boyd Shannon	4,351	4.29	+4.29
Liberal Democrats	Maxwell Holmes	2,625	2.59	+2.59
United Australia	Darren Garnon	2,566	2.53	−0.24
Sustainable Australia	James Holgate	2,260	2.23	+2.23
Independent	Andrew Thaler	2,044	2.01	+2.01
Informed Medical Options	Toni McLennan	909	0.90	+0.90
Democrats	Greg Butler	651	0.64	+0.64
Total formal votes		101,517	93.48	+0.28
Informal votes		7,083	6.52	−0.28
Turnout		108,600	93.35	+0.04
Two-party-preferred result
Labor	Kristy McBain	59,083	58.20	+7.35
Liberal	Jerry Nockles	42,434	41.80	−7.35
Labor hold		Swing	+7.35	

Alluvial diagram for preference flows in the seat of Eden-Monaro in the 2022 federal election. indicates at what stage the winning candidate had over 50% of the votes and was declared the winner.

=== Farrer ===
2022 Australian federal election: Farrer
Party	Candidate	Votes	%	±%
Liberal	Sussan Ley	52,566	52.26	+1.55
Labor	Darren Cameron	19,097	18.99	+4.35
Greens	Eli Davern	9,163	9.11	+4.45
One Nation	Richard Francis	6,363	6.33	+6.33
Shooters, Fishers, Farmers	Paul Britton	5,339	5.31	+5.31
United Australia	Julie Ramos	3,270	3.25	−1.01
Independent	Amanda Duncan-Strelec	3,189	3.17	+3.17
Liberal Democrats	Ian Roworth	1,595	1.59	+0.48
Total formal votes		100,582	92.41	+1.54
Informal votes		8,256	7.59	−1.54
Turnout		108,838	91.28	−1.36
Two-party-preferred result
Liberal	Sussan Ley	66,739	66.35	−3.48
Labor	Darren Cameron	33,843	33.65	+3.48
Liberal hold		Swing	−3.48	

Alluvial diagram for preference flows in the seat of Farrer in the 2022 federal election. The winning candidate got over 50% of first preference votes, so this alluvial diagram is indicative only, and preference flows were not used to determine the final result. The preference flows were used to determine the two-candidate-preferred.

=== Fowler ===
2022 Australian federal election: Fowler
Party	Candidate	Votes	%	±%
Labor	Kristina Keneally	30,973	36.06	−18.48
Independent	Dai Le	25,346	29.51	+29.51
Liberal	Courtney Nguyen	14,740	17.16	−12.89
United Australia	Lela Panich	5,512	6.42	+2.09
Greens	Avery Howard	4,191	4.88	−0.66
One Nation	Tony Margos	3,047	3.55	+3.55
Liberal Democrats	Peter Runge	2,094	2.44	+2.44
Total formal votes		85,903	89.48	+2.59
Informal votes		10,098	10.52	−2.59
Turnout		96,001	88.54	−1.50
Notional two-party-preferred count
Labor	Kristina Keneally	47,864	55.72	–8.27
Liberal	Courtney Nguyen	38,039	44.28	+8.27
Two-candidate-preferred result
Independent	Dai Le	44,348	51.63	+51.63
Labor	Kristina Keneally	41,555	48.37	−15.62
Independent gain from Labor				

Alluvial diagram for preference flows in the seat of Fowler in the 2022 federal election. indicates at what stage the winning candidate had over 50% of the votes and was declared the winner.

=== Gilmore ===
2022 Australian federal election: Gilmore
Party	Candidate	Votes	%	±%
Liberal	Andrew Constance	46,941	42.02	+12.83
Labor	Fiona Phillips	40,175	35.97	−0.22
Greens	Carmel McCallum	11,417	10.22	+0.25
Independent	Nina Digiglio	4,721	4.23	+4.23
One Nation	Jerremy Eid	4,453	3.99	+3.99
United Australia	Jordan Maloney	3,108	2.78	−0.60
Liberal Democrats	Adrian Fadini	890	0.80	+0.80
Total formal votes		111,705	95.58	+0.83
Informal votes		5,170	4.42	−0.83
Turnout		116,875	91.59	−1.29
Two-party-preferred result
Labor	Fiona Phillips	56,039	50.17	−2.44
Liberal	Andrew Constance	55,666	49.83	+2.44
Labor hold		Swing	−2.44	

Alluvial diagram for preference flows in the seat of Gilmore in the 2022 federal election. indicates at what stage the winning candidate had over 50% of the votes and was declared the winner.

=== Grayndler ===
2022 Australian federal election: Grayndler
Party	Candidate	Votes	%	±%
Labor	Anthony Albanese	50,723	53.63	+2.77
Greens	Rachael Jacobs	20,846	22.04	−0.51
Liberal	Ben Zhang	15,111	15.98	−5.78
United Australia	David Smith	2,101	2.22	+1.01
Independent	Sarina Kilham	1,973	2.09	+2.09
One Nation	Paul Henselin	1,449	1.53	+1.53
Fusion	James Haggerty	1,222	1.29	+1.29
Animal Justice	Michael Dello-Iacovo	1,148	1.21	+1.21
Total formal votes		94,573	95.47	−0.28
Informal votes		4,483	4.53	+0.28
Turnout		99,056	90.11	−1.22
Notional two-party-preferred count
Labor	Anthony Albanese	74,571	78.85	+5.02
Liberal	Ben Zhang	20,002	21.15	−5.02
Two-candidate-preferred result
Labor	Anthony Albanese	63,413	67.05	+0.75
Greens	Rachael Jacobs	31,160	32.95	−0.75
Labor hold		Swing	+0.75	

Alluvial diagram for preference flows in the seat of Grayndler in the 2022 federal election. The winning candidate got over 50% of first preference votes, so this alluvial diagram is indicative only, and preference flows were not used to determine the final result. The preference flows were used to determine the two-candidate-preferred.

=== Greenway ===
2022 Australian federal election: Greenway
Party	Candidate	Votes	%	±%
Labor	Michelle Rowland	48,551	48.29	+2.32
Liberal	Pradeep Pathi	29,932	29.77	−10.81
Greens	Damien Atkins	7,086	7.05	+1.55
United Australia	Mark Rex	4,359	4.34	+1.35
Australia One	Riccardo Bosi	3,272	3.25	+3.25
Liberal Democrats	Adam Kachwalla	3,014	3.00	+3.00
One Nation	Rick Turner	2,710	2.70	+2.70
Independent	Love Nanda	1,615	1.61	+1.61
Total formal votes		100,539	91.78	−1.46
Informal votes		8,999	8.22	+1.46
Turnout		109,538	91.38	−1.49
Two-party-preferred result
Labor	Michelle Rowland	61,864	61.53	+8.73
Liberal	Pradeep Pathi	38,675	38.47	−8.73
Labor hold		Swing	+8.73	

Alluvial diagram for preference flows in the seat of Greenway in the 2022 federal election. indicates at what stage the winning candidate had over 50% of the votes and was declared the winner.

=== Hughes ===
2022 Australian federal election: Hughes
Party	Candidate	Votes	%	±%
Liberal	Jenny Ware	42,148	43.49	−9.67
Labor	Riley Campbell	21,828	22.52	−7.94
Independent	Georgia Steele	13,891	14.33	+14.33
United Australia	Craig Kelly	7,186	7.42	+4.94
Greens	Pete Thompson	6,118	6.31	−0.63
Independent	Linda Seymour	3,138	3.24	+3.24
One Nation	Narelle Seymour	2,600	2.68	+2.68
Total formal votes		96,909	95.67	+0.84
Informal votes		4,387	4.33	−0.84
Turnout		101,296	94.42	−0.40
Two-party-preferred result
Liberal	Jenny Ware	55,244	57.01	−2.84
Labor	Riley Campbell	41,665	42.99	+2.84
Liberal hold		Swing	−2.84	

Alluvial diagram for preference flows in the seat of Hughes in the 2022 federal election. indicates at what stage the winning candidate had over 50% of the votes and was declared the winner.

The sitting member, Craig Kelly was elected as a Liberal, but resigned from the party in 2021, subsequently joining United Australia.

=== Hume ===
2022 Australian federal election: Hume
Party	Candidate	Votes	%	±%
Liberal	Angus Taylor	45,177	43.12	−10.17
Labor	Greg Baines	20,864	19.92	−6.65
Independent	Penny Ackery	16,045	15.32	+15.32
One Nation	Rebecca Thompson	7,700	7.35	+7.35
Greens	Karen Stewart	5,194	4.96	−0.14
United Australia	Garry Dollin	4,780	4.56	−0.26
Shooters, Fishers, Farmers	Ross Seller	3,108	2.97	+2.97
Independent	Sheneli Meneripitiyage Dona	1,124	1.07	+1.07
Liberal Democrats	Joaquim de Lima	770	0.73	+0.73
Total formal votes		104,762	92.87	−0.67
Informal votes		8,040	7.13	+0.67
Turnout		112,802	92.68	−1.41
Two-party-preferred result
Liberal	Angus Taylor	60,467	57.72	−5.27
Labor	Greg Baines	44,295	42.28	+5.27
Liberal hold		Swing	−5.27	

Alluvial diagram for preference flows in the seat of Hume in the 2022 federal election. indicates at what stage the winning candidate had over 50% of the votes and was declared the winner.

=== Hunter ===
2022 Australian federal election: Hunter
Party	Candidate	Votes	%	±%
Labor	Dan Repacholi	41,514	38.54	+0.97
National	James Thomson	29,540	27.42	+3.95
One Nation	Dale McNamara	10,759	9.99	−11.60
Greens	Janet Murray	9,562	8.88	+2.01
Independent	Stuart Bonds	6,126	5.69	+5.69
United Australia	Geoff Passfield	4,370	4.06	−0.26
Animal Justice	Victoria Davies	2,469	2.29	−0.91
Independent	Scott Laruffa	1,929	1.79	+1.79
Informed Medical Options	Cathy Townsend	1,458	1.35	+1.35
Total formal votes		107,727	92.37	+1.34
Informal votes		8,901	7.63	−1.34
Turnout		116,628	90.85	−1.44
Two-party-preferred result
Labor	Dan Repacholi	58,200	54.03	+1.05
National	James Thomson	49,527	45.97	−1.05
Labor hold		Swing	+1.05	

Alluvial diagram for preference flows in the seat of Hunter in the 2022 federal election. indicates at what stage the winning candidate had over 50% of the votes and was declared the winner.

=== Kingsford Smith ===
2022 Australian federal election: Kingsford Smith
Party	Candidate	Votes	%	±%
Labor	Matt Thistlethwaite	46,697	47.91	+2.74
Liberal	Grace Tan	27,929	28.66	−7.77
Greens	Stuart Davis	16,401	16.83	+4.73
United Australia	Anthony Tawaf	3,388	3.48	+1.73
One Nation	Darrin Marr	3,051	3.13	+3.13
Total formal votes		97,466	95.52	+1.31
Informal votes		4,572	4.48	−1.31
Turnout		102,038	88.50	−1.67
Two-party-preferred result
Labor	Matt Thistlethwaite	62,868	64.50	+5.69
Liberal	Grace Tan	34,598	35.50	−5.69
Labor hold		Swing	+5.69	

Alluvial diagram for preference flows in the seat of Kingsford Smith in the 2022 federal election. indicates at what stage the winning candidate had over 50% of the votes and was declared the winner.

=== Lindsay ===
2022 Australian federal election: Lindsay
Party	Candidate	Votes	%	±%
Liberal	Melissa McIntosh	48,939	46.73	+0.28
Labor	Trevor Ross	33,206	31.71	−3.90
Greens	Pieter Morssink	8,404	8.02	+3.11
One Nation	Max Jago	6,203	5.92	+5.92
United Australia	Joseph O'Connor	4,272	4.08	+1.17
Informed Medical Options	Rebekah Ray	2,075	1.98	+1.98
Liberal Democrats	Gareth McClure	1,627	1.55	+1.55
Total formal votes		104,726	93.11	+4.19
Informal votes		7,754	6.89	−4.19
Turnout		112,480	90.23	−2.02
Two-party-preferred result
Liberal	Melissa McIntosh	59,003	56.34	+1.30
Labor	Trevor Ross	45,723	43.66	−1.30
Liberal hold		Swing	+1.30	

Alluvial diagram for preference flows in the seat of Lindsay in the 2022 federal election. indicates at what stage the winning candidate had over 50% of the votes and was declared the winner.

=== Lyne ===
2022 Australian federal election: Lyne
Party	Candidate	Votes	%	±%
National	David Gillespie	46,661	43.51	−5.84
Labor	Alex Simpson	23,024	21.47	−2.62
One Nation	Josephine Cashman	8,502	7.93	+7.93
Greens	Karl Attenborough	8,422	7.85	+1.34
Liberal Democrats	Mark Hornshaw	6,824	6.36	+0.56
Independent	Steve Attkins	5,574	5.20	+5.20
United Australia	Joel Putland	4,421	4.12	+0.07
Independent	Joanne Pearce	3,820	3.56	+3.56
Total formal votes		107,248	93.41	+2.48
Informal votes		7,563	6.59	−2.48
Turnout		114,811	92.22	−1.51
Two-party-preferred result
National	David Gillespie	68,421	63.80	−1.37
Labor	Alex Simpson	38,827	36.20	+1.37
National hold		Swing	−1.37	

Alluvial diagram for preference flows in the seat of Lyne in the 2022 federal election. indicates at what stage the winning candidate had over 50% of the votes and was declared the winner.

=== Macarthur ===
2022 Australian federal election: Macarthur
Party	Candidate	Votes	%	±%
Labor	Mike Freelander	51,001	45.89	−1.89
Liberal	Binod Paudel	33,867	30.48	−0.37
One Nation	Adam Zahra	8,876	7.99	−0.61
Greens	Jayden Rivera	8,584	7.72	+3.30
United Australia	Rosa Sicari	6,602	5.94	+3.42
Liberal Democrats	Scott Korman	2,197	1.98	+1.98
Total formal votes		111,127	92.78	+1.63
Informal votes		8,646	7.22	−1.63
Turnout		119,773	89.78	−1.88
Two-party-preferred result
Labor	Mike Freelander	65,039	58.53	+0.13
Liberal	Binod Paudel	46,088	41.47	−0.13
Labor hold		Swing	+0.13	

Alluvial diagram for preference flows in the seat of Macarthur in the 2022 federal election. indicates at what stage the winning candidate had over 50% of the votes and was declared the winner.

=== Mackellar ===
2022 Australian federal election: Mackellar
Party	Candidate	Votes	%	±%
Liberal	Jason Falinski	40,993	41.41	−11.60
Independent	Sophie Scamps	37,724	38.11	+38.11
Labor	Paula Goodman	8,162	8.25	−8.69
Greens	Ethan Hrnjak	6,032	6.09	−5.39
United Australia	Christopher Ball	2,881	2.91	+0.55
One Nation	Darren Dickson	2,624	2.65	+2.65
TNL	Barry Steele	575	0.58	+0.58
Total formal votes		98,991	96.22	+0.93
Informal votes		3,884	3.78	−0.93
Turnout		102,875	92.54	−0.51
Notional two-party-preferred count
Liberal	Jason Falinski	58,012	58.60	−4.62
Labor	Paula Goodman	40,979	41.40	+4.62
Two-candidate-preferred result
Independent	Sophie Scamps	51,973	52.50	+52.50
Liberal	Jason Falinski	47,018	47.50	−15.73
Independent gain from Liberal				

Alluvial diagram for preference flows in the seat of Mackellar in the 2022 federal election. indicates at what stage the winning candidate had over 50% of the votes and was declared the winner.

=== Macquarie ===
2022 Australian federal election: Macquarie
Party	Candidate	Votes	%	±%
Labor	Susan Templeman	41,025	42.98	+4.71
Liberal	Sarah Richards	32,980	34.55	−10.30
Greens	Tony Hickey	9,115	9.55	+0.40
One Nation	Tony Pettitt	4,955	5.19	+5.19
United Australia	Nicole Evans	2,774	2.91	−1.09
Animal Justice	Greg Keightley	2,013	2.11	−1.61
Informed Medical Options	Michelle Palmer	1,318	1.38	+1.38
Liberal Democrats	James Jackson	1,272	1.33	+1.33
Total formal votes		95,452	94.93	−0.79
Informal votes		5,095	5.07	+0.79
Turnout		100,547	93.05	−0.77
Two-party-preferred result
Labor	Susan Templeman	55,143	57.77	+7.58
Liberal	Sarah Richards	40,309	42.23	−7.58
Labor hold		Swing	+7.58	

Alluvial diagram for preference flows in the seat of Macquarie in the 2022 federal election. indicates at what stage the winning candidate had over 50% of the votes and was declared the winner.

=== McMahon ===
2022 Australian federal election: McMahon
Party	Candidate	Votes	%	±%
Labor	Chris Bowen	40,657	47.98	+1.90
Liberal	Vivek Singha	24,006	28.33	−4.98
United Australia	Marie Saliba	7,723	9.11	+5.21
Greens	Astrid O'Neill	4,922	5.81	+0.87
One Nation	Scott Ford	4,612	5.44	−2.81
Liberal Democrats	Cameron Shamsabad	2,822	3.33	+3.33
Total formal votes		84,742	89.39	+1.47
Informal votes		10,057	10.61	−1.47
Turnout		94,799	88.42	−2.56
Two-party-preferred result
Labor	Chris Bowen	50,413	59.49	+2.85
Liberal	Vivek Singha	34,329	40.51	−2.85
Labor hold		Swing	+2.85	

Alluvial diagram for preference flows in the seat of McMahon in the 2022 federal election. indicates at what stage the winning candidate had over 50% of the votes and was declared the winner.

=== Mitchell ===
2022 Australian federal election: Mitchell
Party	Candidate	Votes	%	±%
Liberal	Alex Hawke	56,918	52.61	−9.44
Labor	Immanuel Selvaraj	27,597	25.51	+1.57
Greens	Matt Cox	12,796	11.83	+3.76
United Australia	Linda Daniel	3,916	3.62	+0.88
Liberal Democrats	Clinton Mead	3,708	3.43	+3.43
One Nation	Donald McKenzie	3,258	3.01	+3.01
Total formal votes		108,193	95.74	+0.78
Informal votes		4,811	4.26	−0.78
Turnout		113,004	93.11	−1.02
Two-party-preferred result
Liberal	Alex Hawke	65,662	60.69	−7.94
Labor	Immanuel Selvaraj	42,531	39.31	+7.94
Liberal hold		Swing	−7.94	

Alluvial diagram for preference flows in the seat of Mitchell in the 2022 federal election. The winning candidate got over 50% of first preference votes, so this alluvial diagram is indicative only, and preference flows were not used to determine the final result. The preference flows were used to determine the two-candidate-preferred.

=== New England ===
2022 Australian federal election: New England
Party	Candidate	Votes	%	±%
National	Barnaby Joyce	51,036	52.47	−2.35
Labor	Laura Hughes	18,056	18.56	+5.81
Independent	Matt Sharpham	7,659	7.87	+7.87
Greens	Carol Sparks	7,524	7.74	+3.31
One Nation	Richard Thomas	4,570	4.70	+4.70
Liberal Democrats	Pavlo Samios	3,174	3.26	+3.26
Independent	Natasha Ledger	2,708	2.78	−0.38
United Australia	Cindy Duncan	2,545	2.62	−1.96
Total formal votes		97,272	93.74	+0.56
Informal votes		6,494	6.26	−0.56
Turnout		103,766	91.58	−1.76
Two-party-preferred result
National	Barnaby Joyce	64,622	66.43	−1.20
Labor	Laura Hughes	32,650	33.57	+1.20
National hold		Swing	−1.20	

Alluvial diagram for preference flows in the seat of New England in the 2022 federal election. The winning candidate got over 50% of first preference votes, so this alluvial diagram is indicative only, and preference flows were not used to determine the final result. The preference flows were used to determine the two-candidate-preferred.

=== Newcastle ===
2022 Australian federal election: Newcastle
Party	Candidate	Votes	%	±%
Labor	Sharon Claydon	46,551	44.07	−1.66
Liberal	Katrina Wark	25,816	24.44	−4.77
Greens	Charlotte McCabe	21,195	20.07	+4.51
One Nation	Mark Watson	4,757	4.50	+4.50
Animal Justice	Emily Brollo	2,549	2.41	−0.79
United Australia	Amanda Cook	2,517	2.38	−0.99
Informed Medical Options	William Hussey	1,140	1.08	+1.08
Federation	Garth Pywell	1,102	1.04	+1.04
Total formal votes		105,627	94.59	+0.10
Informal votes		6,038	5.41	−0.10
Turnout		111,665	91.19	−1.53
Two-party-preferred result
Labor	Sharon Claydon	71,807	67.98	+4.15
Liberal	Katrina Wark	33,820	32.02	−4.15
Labor hold		Swing	+4.15	

Alluvial diagram for preference flows in the seat of Newcastle in the 2022 federal election. indicates at what stage the winning candidate had over 50% of the votes and was declared the winner.

=== North Sydney ===
2022 Australian federal election: North Sydney
Party	Candidate	Votes	%	±%
Liberal	Trent Zimmerman	36,956	38.05	−13.91
Independent	Kylea Tink	24,477	25.20	+25.20
Labor	Catherine Renshaw	20,835	21.45	−3.63
Greens	Heather Armstrong	8,308	8.55	−5.07
United Australia	Robert Nalbandian	1,730	1.78	+0.49
Sustainable Australia	William Bourke	1,163	1.20	−0.69
One Nation	Michael Walls	1,149	1.18	+1.18
Liberal Democrats	Dajen Tinkler	1,123	1.16	+1.16
TNL	Victor Kline	886	0.91	+0.91
Informed Medical Options	Lesley Kinney	491	0.51	+0.51
Total formal votes		97,118	94.98	−0.98
Informal votes		5,138	5.02	+0.98
Turnout		102,256	91.55	−0.85
Notional two-party-preferred count
Liberal	Trent Zimmerman	49,781	51.26	−8.01
Labor	Catherine Renshaw	47,337	48.74	+8.01
Two-candidate-preferred result
Independent	Kylea Tink	51,392	52.92	+52.92
Liberal	Trent Zimmerman	45,726	47.08	−12.19
Independent gain from Liberal				

Alluvial diagram for preference flows in the seat of North Sydney in the 2022 federal election. indicates at what stage the winning candidate had over 50% of the votes and was declared the winner.

=== Page ===
2022 Australian federal election: Page
Party	Candidate	Votes	%	±%
National	Kevin Hogan	47,701	45.62	−4.01
Labor	Patrick Deegan	19,531	18.68	−7.68
Independent	Hanabeth Luke	13,734	13.13	+13.13
Greens	Kashmir Miller	8,863	8.48	−3.20
One Nation	Donna Pike	5,621	5.38	+5.38
Liberal Democrats	Thomas Searles	3,896	3.73	+3.73
United Australia	Ian Williamson	2,431	2.32	−0.88
Indigenous-Aboriginal	Brett Duroux	1,733	1.66	+1.66
Federation	Heather Smith	816	0.78	+0.78
TNL	Serge Killingbeck	243	0.23	+0.23
Total formal votes		104,569	93.03	−2.22
Informal votes		7,839	6.97	+2.22
Turnout		112,408	91.47	−1.06
Two-party-preferred result
National	Kevin Hogan	63,512	60.74	+1.29
Labor	Patrick Deegan	41,057	39.26	−1.29
National hold		Swing	+1.29	

Alluvial diagram for preference flows in the seat of Page in the 2022 federal election. indicates at what stage the winning candidate had over 50% of the votes and was declared the winner.

=== Parkes ===
2022 Australian federal election: Parkes
Party	Candidate	Votes	%	±%
National	Mark Coulton	43,931	49.32	−1.44
Labor	Jack Ayoub	18,009	20.22	−3.34
One Nation	Deborah Swinbourn	6,662	7.48	+7.48
Liberal Democrats	Peter Rothwell	5,723	6.42	−1.64
Indigenous-Aboriginal	Derek Hardman	4,466	5.01	+5.01
Greens	Trish Frail	4,214	4.73	+0.56
United Australia	Petrus Van Der Steen	2,372	2.66	−3.63
Independent	Stuart Howe	2,191	2.46	+2.46
Informed Medical Options	Benjamin Fox	1,512	1.70	+1.70
Total formal votes		89,080	92.31	−1.83
Informal votes		7,421	7.69	+1.83
Turnout		96,501	88.53	−2.60
Two-party-preferred result
National	Mark Coulton	60,433	67.84	+0.93
Labor	Jack Ayoub	28,647	32.16	−0.93
National hold		Swing	+0.93	

Alluvial diagram for preference flows in the seat of Parkes in the 2022 federal election. indicates at what stage the winning candidate had over 50% of the votes and was declared the winner.

=== Parramatta ===
2022 Australian federal election: Parramatta
Party	Candidate	Votes	%	±%
Labor	Andrew Charlton	34,258	40.66	−4.42
Liberal	Maria Kovacic	29,492	35.00	−6.28
Greens	Phil Bradley	7,546	8.96	+1.72
United Australia	Julian Fayad	4,269	5.07	+2.49
Independent OLC	Steve Christou	2,982	3.54	+3.54
Animal Justice	Rohan Laxmanalal	2,397	2.84	+2.84
One Nation	Heather Freeman	2,011	2.39	+2.39
Liberal Democrats	Liza Tazewell	1,310	1.55	+1.55
Total formal votes		84,265	91.07	−0.56
Informal votes		8,259	8.93	+0.56
Turnout		92,524	87.73	−1.88
Two-party-preferred result
Labor	Andrew Charlton	45,980	54.57	+1.07
Liberal	Maria Kovacic	38,285	45.43	−1.07
Labor hold		Swing	+1.07	

Alluvial diagram for preference flows in the seat of Parramatta in the 2022 federal election. indicates at what stage the winning candidate had over 50% of the votes and was declared the winner.

=== Paterson ===
2022 Australian federal election: Paterson
Party	Candidate	Votes	%	±%
Labor	Meryl Swanson	46,725	40.67	−0.41
Liberal	Brooke Vitnell	42,142	36.68	+4.16
One Nation	Neil Turner	9,363	8.15	−6.01
Greens	Louise Ihlein	8,677	7.55	+0.65
United Australia	Jason Olbourne	4,474	3.89	+0.28
Informed Medical Options	Angela Ketas	1,883	1.64	+1.64
Liberal Democrats	Sonia Bailey	1,621	1.41	+1.41
Total formal votes		114,885	94.93	+0.78
Informal votes		6,142	5.07	−0.78
Turnout		121,027	91.66	−1.58
Two-party-preferred result
Labor	Meryl Swanson	61,247	53.31	−1.73
Liberal	Brooke Vitnell	53,638	46.69	+1.73
Labor hold		Swing	−1.73	

Alluvial diagram for preference flows in the seat of Paterson in the 2022 federal election. indicates at what stage the winning candidate had over 50% of the votes and was declared the winner.

=== Reid ===
2022 Australian federal election: Reid
Party	Candidate	Votes	%	±%
Labor	Sally Sitou	40,768	41.61	+4.40
Liberal	Fiona Martin	37,126	37.89	−10.43
Greens	Charles Jago	9,184	9.37	+1.29
Independent	Natalie Baini	2,994	3.06	+3.06
United Australia	Jamal Daoud	2,530	2.58	+0.66
One Nation	Edward Walters	1,997	2.04	+2.04
Liberal Democrats	Andrew Cameron	1,824	1.86	+1.86
Fusion	Sahar Khalili-Naghadeh	1,553	1.59	+1.59
Total formal votes		97,976	93.51	−0.36
Informal votes		6,800	6.49	+0.36
Turnout		104,776	90.68	−1.03
Two-party-preferred result
Labor	Sally Sitou	54,076	55.19	+8.37
Liberal	Fiona Martin	43,900	44.81	−8.37
Labor gain from Liberal		Swing	+8.37	

Alluvial diagram for preference flows in the seat of Reid in the 2022 federal election. indicates at what stage the winning candidate had over 50% of the votes and was declared the winner.

=== Richmond ===
2022 Australian federal election: Richmond
Party	Candidate	Votes	%	±%
Labor	Justine Elliot	28,733	28.80	−2.91
Greens	Mandy Nolan	25,216	25.27	+4.95
National	Kimberly Hone	23,299	23.35	−13.51
Liberal Democrats	Gary Biggs	7,681	7.70	+7.70
One Nation	Tracey Bell-Henselin	4,073	4.08	+4.08
United Australia	Robert Marks	2,922	2.93	−0.97
Independent	David Warth	2,341	2.35	+2.35
Informed Medical Options	Monica Shepherd	2,271	2.28	+1.10
Independent	Nathan Jones	1,974	1.98	+1.98
Independent	Terry Sharples	1,274	1.28	+1.28
Total formal votes		99,784	93.08	+0.52
Informal votes		7,424	6.92	−0.52
Turnout		107,208	90.37	−0.45
Two-party-preferred result
Labor	Justine Elliot	58,104	58.23	+4.15
National	Kimberly Hone	41,680	41.77	−4.15
Labor hold		Swing	+4.15	

Alluvial diagram for preference flows in the seat of Richmond in the 2022 federal election. indicates at what stage the winning candidate had over 50% of the votes and was declared the winner.

=== Riverina ===
2022 Australian federal election: Riverina
Party	Candidate	Votes	%	±%
National	Michael McCormack	45,951	46.57	−13.36
Labor	Mark Jeffreson	20,193	20.47	−2.69
One Nation	Richard Orchard	8,042	8.15	+8.15
Liberal Democrats	Dean McCrae	6,563	6.65	+6.65
Greens	Michael Organ	6,349	6.43	+0.23
Shooters, Fishers, Farmers	Steve Karaitiana	6,280	6.37	+6.37
Independent	Darren Ciavarella	2,701	2.74	+2.74
United Australia	Daniel Martelozzo	2,585	2.62	−8.09
Total formal votes		98,664	92.68	−2.16
Informal votes		7,794	7.32	+2.16
Turnout		106,458	91.75	−1.64
Two-party-preferred result
National	Michael McCormack	63,979	64.85	−4.63
Labor	Mark Jeffreson	34,685	35.15	+4.63
National hold		Swing	−4.63	

Alluvial diagram for preference flows in the seat of Riverina in the 2022 federal election. indicates at what stage the winning candidate had over 50% of the votes and was declared the winner.

=== Robertson ===
2022 Australian federal election: Robertson
Party	Candidate	Votes	%	±%
Liberal	Lucy Wicks	38,448	39.96	−6.90
Labor	Gordon Reid	36,231	37.66	+3.56
Greens	Shelly McGrath	9,642	10.02	+2.11
One Nation	Billy O'Grady	3,679	3.82	+3.82
United Australia	Barbara-Jane Murray	2,792	2.90	+0.09
Animal Justice	Patrick Murphy	1,949	2.03	−0.05
Indigenous-Aboriginal	Jeffrey Lawson	1,127	1.17	+1.17
Informed Medical Options	Kate Mason	1,114	1.16	+1.16
Liberal Democrats	Bentley Logan	736	0.76	+0.76
Citizens	Paul Borthwick	272	0.28	+0.28
Federation	Alexandra Hafner	220	0.23	+0.23
Total formal votes		96,210	93.88	+1.12
Informal votes		6,274	6.12	−1.12
Turnout		102,484	91.07	−2.10
Two-party-preferred result
Labor	Gordon Reid	50,277	52.26	+6.50
Liberal	Lucy Wicks	45,933	47.74	−6.50
Labor gain from Liberal		Swing	+6.50	

Alluvial diagram for preference flows in the seat of Robertson in the 2022 federal election. indicates at what stage the winning candidate had over 50% of the votes and was declared the winner.

=== Shortland ===
2022 Australian federal election: Shortland
Party	Candidate	Votes	%	±%
Labor	Pat Conroy	40,135	40.02	−1.11
Liberal	Nell McGill	32,215	32.12	−5.25
Greens	Kim Grierson	9,910	9.88	+1.62
One Nation	Quintin King	6,397	6.38	+6.38
United Australia	Kenneth Maxwell	3,125	3.12	−1.41
Liberal Democrats	Barry Reed	2,984	2.98	+2.98
Animal Justice	Bree Roberts	2,979	2.97	−0.63
Independent	Basil Paynter	2,554	2.55	+2.55
Total formal votes		100,299	93.94	+0.35
Informal votes		6,467	6.06	−0.35
Turnout		106,766	91.85	−1.81
Two-party-preferred result
Labor	Pat Conroy	55,985	55.82	+1.37
Liberal	Nell McGill	44,314	44.18	−1.37
Labor hold		Swing	+1.37	

Alluvial diagram for preference flows in the seat of Shortland in the 2022 federal election. indicates at what stage the winning candidate had over 50% of the votes and was declared the winner.

=== Sydney ===
2022 Australian federal election: Sydney
Party	Candidate	Votes	%	±%
Labor	Tanya Plibersek	52,410	50.82	+1.41
Greens	Chetan Sahai	23,732	23.01	+4.94
Liberal	Alexander Andruska	20,276	19.66	−6.95
United Australia	Ryan McAlister	2,298	2.23	+0.79
One Nation	Ben Ferguson	1,889	1.83	+1.83
Socialist Alliance	Andrew Chuter	1,518	1.47	+1.47
Citizens	Wen Zhou	1,002	0.97	+0.97
Total formal votes		103,125	96.72	+0.53
Informal votes		3,499	3.28	−0.53
Turnout		106,624	85.01	−1.29
Notional two-party-preferred count
Labor	Tanya Plibersek	77,933	75.57	+6.90
Liberal	Alexander Andruska	25,192	24.43	−6.90
Two-candidate-preferred result
Labor	Tanya Plibersek	68,770	66.69	−1.98
Greens	Chetan Sahai	34,355	33.31	+33.31
Labor hold				

Alluvial diagram for preference flows in the seat of Sydney in the 2022 federal election. The winning candidate got over 50% of first preference votes, so this alluvial diagram is indicative only, and preference flows were not used to determine the final result. The preference flows were used to determine the two-candidate-preferred.

=== Warringah ===
2022 Australian federal election: Warringah
Party	Candidate	Votes	%	±%
Independent	Zali Steggall	41,832	44.82	+1.36
Liberal	Katherine Deves	31,129	33.35	−5.66
Labor	David Mickleburgh	7,806	8.36	+1.75
Greens	Kristyn Glanville	6,910	7.40	+1.27
United Australia	Andrew Robertson	2,202	2.36	+1.68
One Nation	Steven Tripp	1,980	2.12	+2.12
Animal Justice	Kate Paterson	1,475	1.58	+0.18
Total formal votes		93,334	97.06	+2.11
Informal votes		2,829	2.94	−2.11
Turnout		96,163	91.34	−1.06
Notional two-party-preferred count
Liberal	Katherine Deves	48,001	51.43	−0.69
Labor	David Mickleburgh	45,333	48.57	+0.69
Two-candidate-preferred result
Independent	Zali Steggall	56,892	60.96	+3.72
Liberal	Katherine Deves	36,442	39.04	−3.72
Independent hold		Swing	+3.72	

Alluvial diagram for preference flows in the seat of Warringah in the 2022 federal election. indicates at what stage the winning candidate had over 50% of the votes and was declared the winner.

=== Watson ===
2022 Australian federal election: Watson
Party	Candidate	Votes	%	±%
Labor	Tony Burke	44,464	51.87	+0.18
Liberal	Sazeda Akter	22,759	26.55	−2.85
Greens	Bradley Schott	8,200	9.57	+2.47
United Australia	John Koukoulis	6,126	7.15	+2.94
One Nation	Alan Jorgensen	4,178	4.87	+4.87
Total formal votes		85,727	90.27	+2.88
Informal votes		9,245	9.73	−2.88
Turnout		94,972	87.36	−2.09
Two-party-preferred result
Labor	Tony Burke	55,810	65.10	+1.58
Liberal	Sazeda Akter	29,917	34.90	−1.58
Labor hold		Swing	+1.58	

Alluvial diagram for preference flows in the seat of Watson in the 2022 federal election. The winning candidate got over 50% of first preference votes, so this alluvial diagram is indicative only, and preference flows were not used to determine the final result. The preference flows were used to determine the two-candidate-preferred.

=== Wentworth ===
2022 Australian federal election: Wentworth
Party	Candidate	Votes	%	±%
Liberal	Dave Sharma	35,995	40.48	−6.96
Independent	Allegra Spender	31,810	35.77	+35.77
Labor	Tim Murray	9,654	10.86	−0.09
Greens	Dominic Wy Kanak	7,410	8.33	+0.80
United Australia	Natalie Dumer	1,813	2.04	+1.34
Liberal Democrats	Daniel Lewkovitz	1,346	1.51	+1.51
One Nation	Dean Fisher	895	1.01	+1.01
Total formal votes		88,923	97.50	+0.49
Informal votes		2,277	2.50	−0.49
Turnout		91,200	87.93	−1.47
Notional two-party-preferred count
Liberal	Dave Sharma	49,727	55.92	−3.93
Labor	Tim Murray	39,196	44.08	+3.93
Two-candidate-preferred result
Independent	Allegra Spender	48,186	54.19	+54.19
Liberal	Dave Sharma	40,737	45.81	−5.50
Independent gain from Liberal				

Alluvial diagram for preference flows in the seat of Wentworth in the 2022 federal election. indicates at what stage the winning candidate had over 50% of the votes and was declared the winner.

=== Werriwa ===
2022 Australian federal election: Werriwa
Party	Candidate	Votes	%	±%
Labor	Anne Stanley	40,108	39.86	−7.90
Liberal	Sam Kayal	30,864	30.67	−4.60
Liberal Democrats	Victor Tey	8,978	8.92	+8.92
United Australia	Tony Nikolic	8,813	8.76	+4.56
Greens	Apurva Shukla	6,772	6.73	+1.36
One Nation	Adam Booke	5,096	5.06	+5.06
Total formal votes		100,631	90.18	+1.75
Informal votes		10,962	9.82	−1.75
Turnout		111,593	88.53	−2.00
Two-party-preferred result
Labor	Anne Stanley	56,173	55.82	+0.35
Liberal	Sam Kayal	44,458	44.18	−0.35
Labor hold		Swing	+0.35	

Alluvial diagram for preference flows in the seat of Werriwa in the 2022 federal election. indicates at what stage the winning candidate had over 50% of the votes and was declared the winner.

=== Whitlam ===
2022 Australian federal election: Whitlam
Party	Candidate	Votes	%	±%
Labor	Stephen Jones	49,218	45.01	−3.79
Liberal	Mike Cains	30,849	28.21	+28.21
Greens	Jamie Dixon	11,779	10.77	+1.56
One Nation	Colin Hughes	7,543	6.90	+6.90
United Australia	Allan Wode	5,886	5.38	−3.46
Liberal Democrats	Michael Wheeler	4,062	3.72	+3.72
Total formal votes		109,337	95.10	+2.35
Informal votes		5,637	4.90	−2.35
Turnout		114,974	91.69	−1.57
Two-party-preferred result
Labor	Stephen Jones	65,683	60.07	−0.84
Liberal	Mike Cains	43,654	39.93	+39.93
Labor hold				

Alluvial diagram for preference flows in the seat of Whitlam in the 2022 federal election. indicates at what stage the winning candidate had over 50% of the votes and was declared the winner.
