= Laughter (disambiguation) =

Laughter is an audible expression of merriment or amusement.

Laughter may also refer to:

- Laughter (Ian Dury & The Blockheads album)
- Laughter (The Mighty Lemon Drops album)
- "Laughter", a 1994 song by James from the album Wah Wah
- Laughter (1930 film), a 1930 film starring Fredric March
- Laughter (2020 film), a Canadian film directed by Martin Laroche
- Laughter (book), a 1900 collection of three essays by Henri Bergson
- Laughter (novel), an Arabic novel by Ghalib Halasa
- Laughter EP, a 2017 release by Tiny Vipers

== See also ==
- Laughter yoga, a technique that uses laughter exercises
- Laughter in literature
- Laughter Chilembe (born 1975), Zambian footballer
- Laugh (disambiguation) and Laughing (disambiguation)
- Giggle (disambiguation) and Snickers (disambiguation)
- Chuckles (disambiguation)
- Sylvia Laughter, American politician
