= Giggle (disambiguation) =

A giggle is a high-pitched, bubbly laugh.

Giggle or Giggles may also refer to:

- Giggles the Pig, a 2015 mayoral candidate in Flint, Michigan
- Giggles (Happy Tree Friends), a chipmunk character from Happy Tree Friends
- Giggle (comic), a British comic book that merged with Buster
- "Giggles", an episode of The Little Mermaid
- "The Giggle", an episode of Phil of the Future
- Jimmy Giggle, a character on Australian children's television show Giggle and Hoot
- Giggles, a discontinued American version of the British biscuit Happy Faces
- "The Giggle", an episode of the 2023 specials of Doctor Who
- Giggle, a women's only mobile app founded by Sall Grover
- "Giggle", a song by Jay Chou from the 2012 album Opus 12
- Giggles (Bookshop)
