= Chuckles (disambiguation) =

Chuckles may refer to:

- Chuck Bueche (AKA Chuckles), a game programmer
- Chuckles, a confectionery produced by Farley's & Sathers Candy Company, Inc.
- Chuckles (G.I. Joe), a character in the toyline G.I. Joe: A Real American Hero
- Chuckles the Clown, a character on the television show The Mary Tyler Moore Show
- The Dark Lord Chuckles the Silly Piggy, a character on the television show Dave the Barbarian
- Chuckles, a character in the movie Toy Story 3

== See also ==
- Laughter (disambiguation)
