= Last Laugh =

Last Laugh or The Last Laugh may refer to:

== Literature ==
- Last Laugh (comics), a DC Comics crossover series featuring the Joker
- The Last Laugh (The Hardy Boys), a novel in the Hardy Boys Casefiles series
- The Last Laugh: a new philosophy of near-death experiences, apparitions, and the paranormal, a 1999 book by Raymond Moody
- "The Last Laugh" (poem), by Wilfred Owen
- Last Laugh, the English-language title of the Japanese play Warai no Daigaku by Mitani Koki
- The Last Laugh, a 2007 play by television writer Richard Harris
- "The Last Laugh" (short story), 1901, by E. W. Hornung

== Film ==
- The Last Laugh (1924 film), a silent film directed by F. W. Murnau
- The Last Laugh (2016 film), a documentary film exploring the ramifications of using the Holocaust as a topic for humor
- The Last Laugh (2019 film), an American comedy film written and directed by Greg Pritikin
- The Last Laugh (2023 film), a Peruvian comedy film written and directed by Gonzalo Ladines

== Television episodes ==
- "The Last Laugh" (Batman: The Animated Series)
- "The Last Laugh", a Ben 10 episode
- "The Last Laugh" (Care Bears episode)
- "Last Laugh" (CSI episode)
- "The Last Laugh" (Diagnosis: Murder)
- "The Last Laugh" (Gotham)
- "The Last Laugh", a season 6 episode of The Loud House
- "Last Laugh" (M*A*S*H)
- "The Last Laugh", a My Little Pony: Friendship is Magic episode
- "The Last Laugh", a season 2 episode of the 1981 Hanna-Barbera adaption of The Smurfs

== Music ==
- The Last Laugh (Helios Creed album), 1989
- The Last Laugh (Joker's Daughter album), 2009
- "The Last Laugh", a song by Ray Stevens from the album Shriner's Convention
- "The Last Laugh", a monologue from the 1996 album The Dark Saga by heavy metal band Iced Earth
- "The Last Laugh", a song from the 1996 album Feel Sorry for the Fanatic by heavy metal band Morgoth
- "The Last Laugh", a song from the 2001 album Saviour by UK band Antimatter
- "The Last Laugh", a song from Mark Knopfler's 2000 album Sailing to Philadelphia
- "Last Laugh", a song by Blind Melon from For My Friends
- "Last Laugh", a song by Chino XL and B-Real from I Told You So
- "Last Laugh", a song by Don Toliver from Hardstone Psycho

== Other uses ==
- Scroggs The Last Laugh, a 1929 experimental aircraft
- The Last Laugh (comedy venue), a comedy club in Melbourne, Australia

== See also ==
- Laugh (disambiguation)
- The Last Man (disambiguation)
