= Lafer =

Lafer is a surname. Notable people with the name include:

- Celso Lafer (born 1941), Brazilian jurist
- Gordon Lafer (born 1960), American political economist
- Johann Lafer (born 1957), Austrian chef

== See also ==
- Laffer (disambiguation), includes a list of people with surname Laffer
