= Laughing (disambiguation) =

Laughing may refer to:

- Laughter, an expression or sound
- Laughing (character), a character in the Hong Kong TV series E.U.
- Laughing (EP), an EP by Anne McCue
- "Laughing" (The Guess Who song), a single by Canadian rock band The Guess Who from their 1969 album Canned Wheat
- "Laughing" (David Crosby song), a song by American guitarist and singer David Crosby on his 1971 solo album If I Could Only Remember My Name
- "Laughing", a song by The Byrds from their 1973 album Byrds
- "Laughing", a song by R.E.M. from their 1983 album Murmur
- "Laughing Song", a poem by William Blake
- "The Laughing Song", a song by George Washington Johnson, the first song by an African American to top the chart in 1891
- "The Laughing Song", Adele's aria "Mein Herr Marquis" from Johann Strauss the Younger's 1874 operetta Die Fledermaus
- "Laughing Song", or "L'éclat de rire", from the opera Manon Lescaut by Daniel Auber
- Laughing dove, a small pigeon that is a resident breeder in Sub-Saharan Africa

== See also ==
- Laugh (disambiguation)
