= Laugher =

Laugher may refer to:

- Someone who laughs
- The laugher (Charadra deridens), a species of moth
- Jack Laugher (born 1995), a British diver

== See also ==
- Laffer (disambiguation)
