= Results of the 2019 Australian federal election in New South Wales =

2019 Australian federal election (New South Wales)
← 2016	18 May 2019	2022 →

All 47 New South Wales seats in the Australian House of Representatives and 6 seats in the Australian Senate
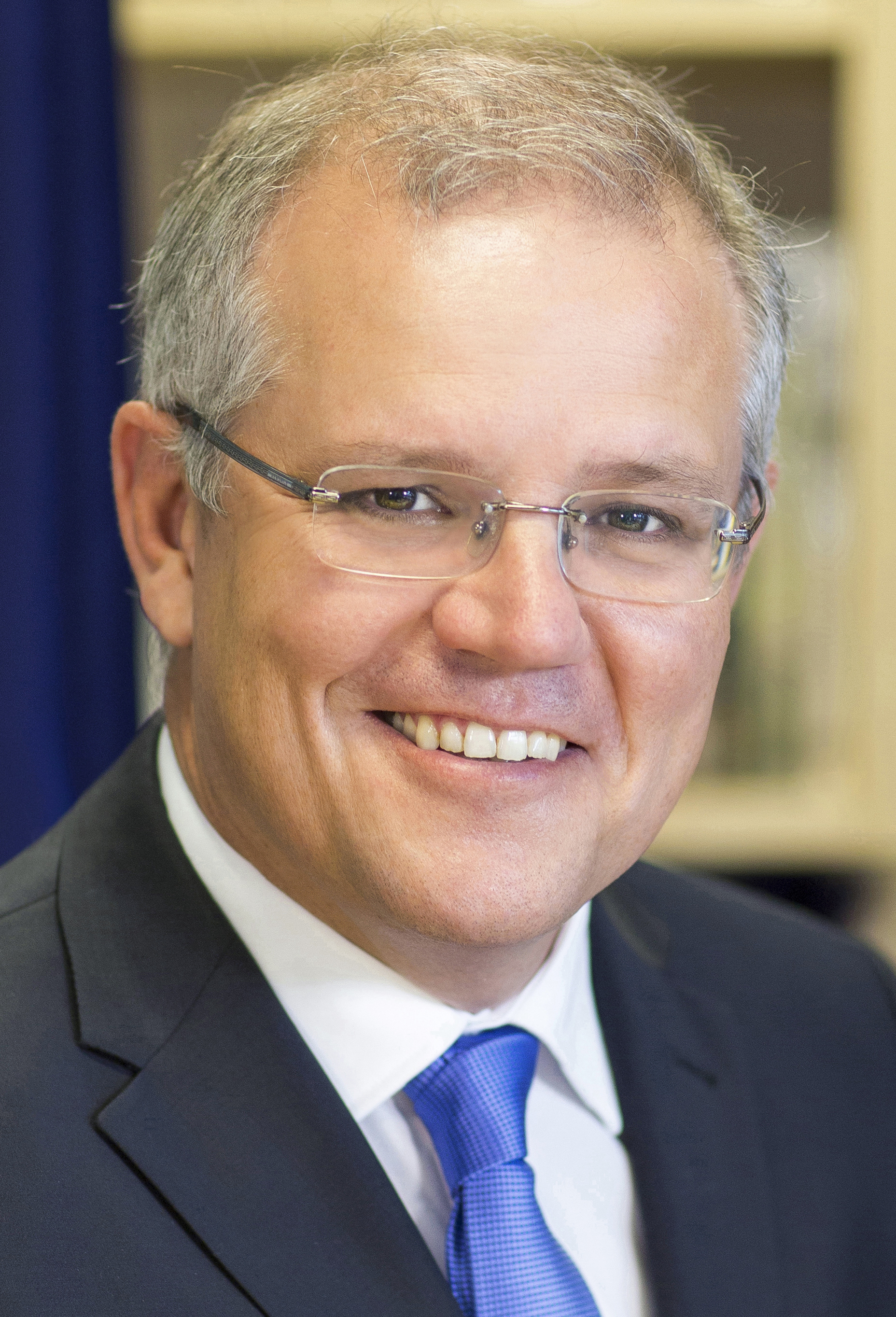

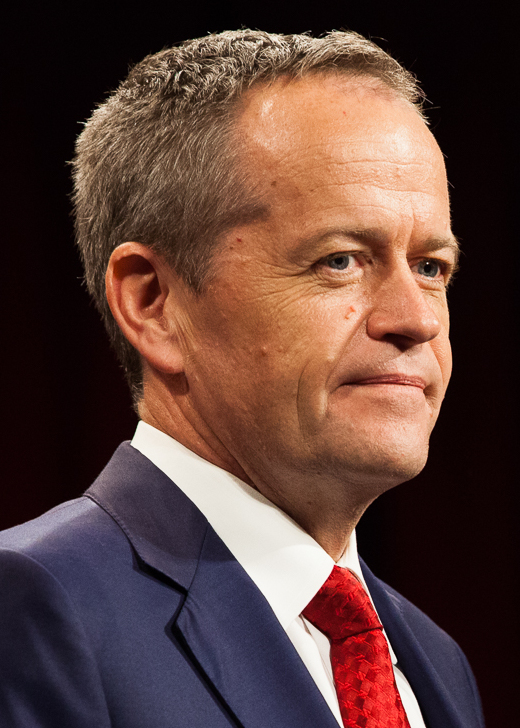
	First party	Second party
Leader	Scott Morrison	Bill Shorten
Party	Liberal/National coalition	Labor
Last election	23 seats	24 seats
Seats won	22 seats	24 seats
Seat change	▼1	Steady
Popular vote	1,930,426	1,568,223
Percentage	42.54%	34.56%
Swing	▲0.22	▼2.37
TPP	51.78%	48.22%
TPP swing	▲1.25	▼1.25
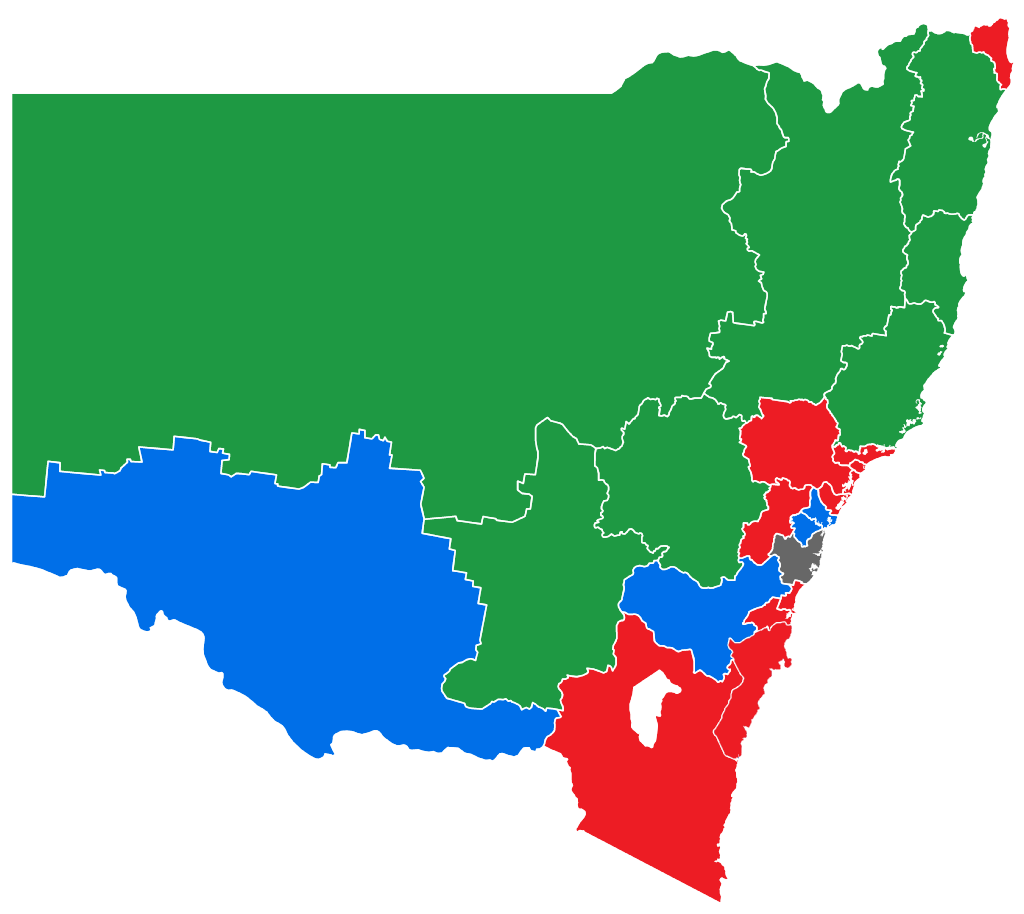
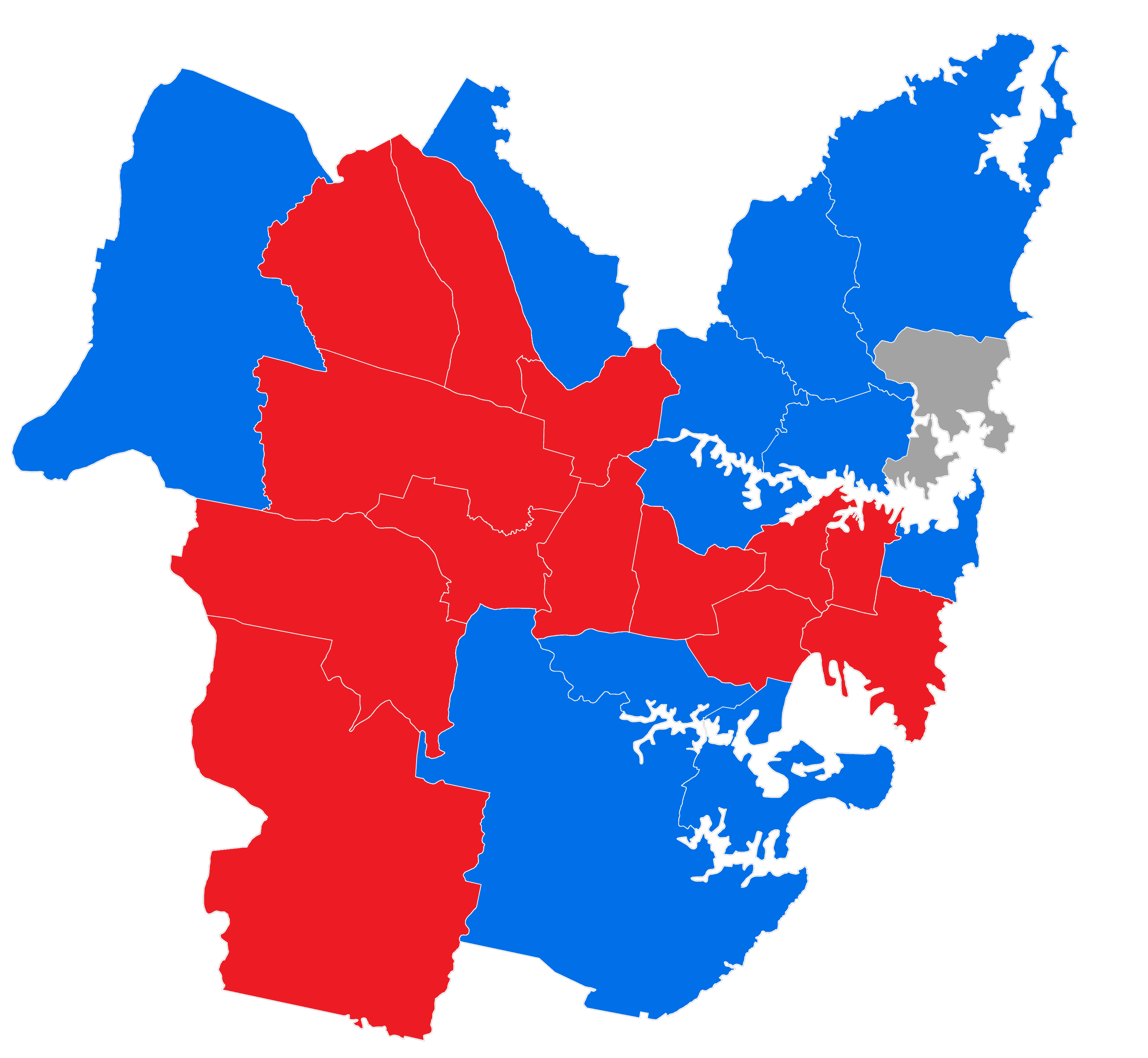

This is a list of electoral division results for the 2019 Australian federal election in the state of New South Wales.

This election was held using instant-runoff voting. At this election, there were two "turn-overs" in New South Wales. Labor won the seat of Macquarie despite the Liberals finishing first, as well as the seat of Richmond despite the Nationals finishing first.

== Overall results ==
Party	Votes	%	Swing	Seats	Change
Liberal/National Coalition
Liberal Party of Australia	1,461,560	32.21	−0.47	15	▼1
National Party of Australia	468,866	10.33	+0.69	7	Steady
Coalition total	1,930,426	42.54	+0.22	22	▼1
Australian Labor Party	1,568,223	34.56	−2.37	24	Steady
Australian Greens	395,238	8.71	−0.24		
United Australia Party	153,477	3.38	+3.38		
Christian Democratic Party	97,513	2.15	−1.74		
Pauline Hanson's One Nation	59,464	1.31	+0.68		
Animal Justice Party	29,981	0.66	+0.19		
Sustainable Australia	27,399	0.60	+0.59		
Liberal Democratic Party	19,291	0.43	−0.03		
Shooters, Fishers and Farmers Party	18,129	0.40	+0.32		
Science Party	10,791	0.24	−0.10		
Fraser Anning's Conservative National Party	7,654	0.17	+0.17		
Australian Better Families	2,072	0.05	+0.05		
Australian Workers Party	1,676	0.04	+0.04		
Socialist Equality Party	1,389	0.03	0.00		
Australia First Party	1,372	0.03	−0.04		
Non-Custodial Parents Party (Equal Parenting)	1,213	0.03	−0.05		
Involuntary Medication Objectors	1,179	0.03	+0.03		
The Great Australian Party	1,086	0.02	+0.02		
Independent	209,763	4.62	+0.68	1	▲1
Total	4,537,336			47	
Two-party-preferred vote
Liberal/National Coalition	2,349,641	51.78	+1.25		▼1
Labor	2,187,695	48.22	−1.25		Steady
Invalid/blank votes	342,051	7.01	+0.84		
Registered voters/turnout	5,294,468	92.16	+0.67		
Source: AEC Tally Room

== Results by division ==
=== Banks ===
2019 Australian federal election: Banks
Party	Candidate	Votes	%	±%
Liberal	David Coleman	46,709	50.92	+7.03
Labor	Chris Gambian	33,341	36.35	−3.60
Greens	Gianluca Dragone	5,339	5.82	+0.00
Christian Democrats	Ki Man Ho	2,624	2.86	−2.46
United Australia	Reginald Wright	2,029	2.21	+2.21
Animal Justice	Anjali Thakur	1,688	1.84	+0.11
Total formal votes		91,730	92.80	−0.30
Informal votes		7,115	7.20	+0.30
Turnout		98,845	93.03	+1.04
Two-party-preferred result
Liberal	David Coleman	51,609	56.26	+4.82
Labor	Chris Gambian	40,121	43.74	−4.82
Liberal hold		Swing	+4.82	

=== Barton ===
2019 Australian federal election: Barton
Party	Candidate	Votes	%	±%
Labor	Linda Burney	44,227	49.19	+1.44
Liberal	Pramej Shrestha	30,109	33.49	−1.90
Greens	Connor Parissis	8,123	9.03	+0.20
One Nation	Phillip Pollard	3,288	3.66	+3.66
Christian Democrats	Sonny Susilo	2,103	2.34	−1.89
United Australia	Ben Tung Liu	2,057	2.29	+2.29
Total formal votes		89,907	90.47	−1.18
Informal votes		9,473	9.53	+1.18
Turnout		99,380	91.18	+1.34
Two-party-preferred result
Labor	Linda Burney	53,418	59.41	+1.11
Liberal	Pramej Shrestha	36,489	40.59	−1.11
Labor hold		Swing	+1.11	

=== Bennelong ===
2019 Australian federal election: Bennelong
Party	Candidate	Votes	%	±%
Liberal	John Alexander	48,942	50.82	+0.41
Labor	Brian Owler	32,769	34.03	+5.55
Greens	Qiu Yue Zhang	9,116	9.47	+0.34
Christian Democrats	Julie Worsley	3,588	3.73	−2.67
United Australia	Andrew Marks	1,890	1.96	+1.96
Total formal votes		96,305	94.84	−0.07
Informal votes		5,237	5.16	+0.07
Turnout		101,542	93.32	+1.61
Two-party-preferred result
Liberal	John Alexander	54,809	56.91	−2.81
Labor	Brian Owler	41,496	43.09	+2.81
Liberal hold		Swing	−2.81	

=== Berowra ===
2019 Australian federal election: Berowra
Party	Candidate	Votes	%	±%
Liberal	Julian Leeser	53,741	57.20	+0.11
Labor	Katie Gompertz	19,821	21.10	+1.22
Greens	Monica Tan	11,157	11.88	+0.38
Christian Democrats	Simon Taylor	2,163	2.30	−3.24
Independent	Mick Gallagher	2,104	2.24	−0.80
United Australia	Craig McLachlan	1,576	1.68	+1.68
Science	Brendan Clarke	1,465	1.56	−0.50
Sustainable Australia	Justin Thomas	1,425	1.52	+1.52
Independent	Roger Woodward	495	0.53	−0.35
Total formal votes		93,947	93.60	−2.24
Informal votes		6,423	6.40	+2.24
Turnout		100,370	94.39	+1.18
Two-party-preferred result
Liberal	Julian Leeser	61,675	65.65	−0.80
Labor	Katie Gompertz	32,272	34.35	+0.80
Liberal hold		Swing	−0.80	

=== Blaxland ===
2019 Australian federal election: Blaxland
Party	Candidate	Votes	%	±%
Labor	Jason Clare	46,689	57.78	−5.53
Liberal	Oz Guney	23,289	28.82	+4.00
Greens	James Rooney	4,329	5.36	+0.73
Christian Democrats	Veronica Rowe	4,173	5.16	−0.86
United Australia	Nadeem Ashraf	2,328	2.88	+2.88
Total formal votes		80,808	86.70	−1.75
Informal votes		12,401	13.30	+1.75
Turnout		93,209	88.45	+1.20
Two-party-preferred result
Labor	Jason Clare	52,299	64.72	−4.76
Liberal	Oz Guney	28,509	35.28	+4.76
Labor hold		Swing	−4.76	

=== Bradfield ===
2019 Australian federal election: Bradfield
Party	Candidate	Votes	%	±%
Liberal	Paul Fletcher	58,007	60.33	−0.79
Labor	Chris Haviland	20,361	21.18	+4.17
Greens	Tony Adams	13,177	13.71	+2.03
Sustainable Australia	Stephen Molloy	2,826	2.94	+2.94
United Australia	Marcus Versace	1,772	1.84	+1.84
Total formal votes		96,143	95.95	−0.50
Informal votes		4,056	4.05	+0.50
Turnout		100,199	93.38	+1.50
Two-party-preferred result
Liberal	Paul Fletcher	63,997	66.56	−4.48
Labor	Chris Haviland	32,146	33.44	+4.48
Liberal hold		Swing	−4.48	

=== Calare ===
2019 Australian federal election: Calare
Party	Candidate	Votes	%	±%
National	Andrew Gee	46,632	44.71	−2.87
Labor	Jess Jennings	23,074	22.13	−4.93
Shooters, Fishers, Farmers	Sam Romano	18,129	17.38	+17.38
Greens	Stephanie Luke	6,315	6.06	−1.16
Liberal Democrats	Stephen Bisgrove	4,775	4.58	−1.96
United Australia	Beverley Cameron	3,371	3.23	+3.23
Christian Democrats	Shuyi Chen	1,992	1.91	−0.47
Total formal votes		104,288	94.35	−0.47
Informal votes		6,251	5.66	+0.47
Turnout		110,539	93.60	−0.04
Two-party-preferred result
National	Andrew Gee	66,006	63.29	+1.48
Labor	Jess Jennings	38,282	36.71	−1.48
National hold		Swing	+1.48	

=== Chifley ===
2019 Australian federal election: Chifley
Party	Candidate	Votes	%	±%
Labor	Ed Husic	49,418	54.30	−6.79
Liberal	Livingston Chettipally	25,411	27.92	+5.26
Christian Democrats	Josh Green	5,859	6.44	−2.70
Greens	Brent Robertson	4,604	5.06	+0.52
United Australia	Joseph O'Connor	4,133	4.54	+4.54
Independent	Ammar Khan	1,581	1.74	−0.82
Total formal votes		91,006	90.34	−1.32
Informal votes		9,728	9.66	+1.32
Turnout		100,734	89.96	+0.08
Two-party-preferred result
Labor	Ed Husic	56,761	62.37	−6.82
Liberal	Livingston Chettipally	34,245	37.63	+6.82
Labor hold		Swing	−6.82	

=== Cook ===
2019 Australian federal election: Cook
Party	Candidate	Votes	%	±%
Liberal	Scott Morrison	59,895	63.70	+5.35
Labor	Simon O'Brien	21,718	23.10	−3.47
Greens	Jon Doig	6,406	6.81	+0.03
One Nation	Gaye Cameron	3,277	3.49	+3.49
United Australia	John McSweyn	1,135	1.21	+1.21
Christian Democrats	Roger Bolling	1,041	1.11	−3.74
Conservative National	Peter Kelly	551	0.59	+0.59
Total formal votes		94,023	93.87	−0.96
Informal votes		6,141	6.13	+0.96
Turnout		100,164	93.65	+1.29
Two-party-preferred result
Liberal	Scott Morrison	64,894	69.02	+3.63
Labor	Simon O'Brien	29,129	30.98	−3.63
Liberal hold		Swing	+3.63	

=== Cowper ===
2019 Australian federal election: Cowper
Party	Candidate	Votes	%	±%
National	Pat Conaghan	49,668	47.07	+1.10
Independent	Rob Oakeshott	25,847	24.49	−1.80
Labor	Andrew Woodward	14,551	13.79	+0.18
Greens	Lauren Edwards	6,264	5.94	−0.73
United Australia	Alexander Stewart	3,188	3.02	+3.02
Christian Democrats	Ruth Meads	2,383	2.26	−1.16
Animal Justice	Kellie Pearce	2,176	2.06	+2.06
Independent	Allan Green	1,451	1.37	+1.37
Total formal votes		105,528	92.22	−2.63
Informal votes		8,898	7.78	+2.63
Turnout		114,426	92.03	−0.20
Notional two-party-preferred count
National	Pat Conaghan	65,302	61.88	−0.70
Labor	Andrew Woodward	40,266	38.12	+0.70
Two-candidate-preferred result
National	Pat Conaghan	59,932	56.79	+2.23
Independent	Rob Oakeshott	45,596	43.21	−2.23
National hold		Swing	+2.23	

=== Cunningham ===
2019 Australian federal election: Cunningham
Party	Candidate	Votes	%	±%
Labor	Sharon Bird	46,923	46.61	−1.28
Liberal	Chris Atlee	31,177	30.97	+1.81
Greens	Rowan Huxtable	15,196	15.09	+0.44
United Australia	Grace Younger	3,828	3.80	+3.80
Sustainable Australia	John Gill	2,340	2.32	+2.32
Non-Custodial Parents	John Flanagan	1,213	1.20	−0.43
Total formal votes		100,677	94.30	−0.86
Informal votes		6,080	5.70	+0.86
Turnout		106,757	92.65	+1.14
Two-party-preferred result
Labor	Sharon Bird	63,836	63.41	+0.09
Liberal	Chris Atlee	36,841	36.59	−0.09
Labor hold		Swing	+0.09	

=== Dobell ===
2019 Australian federal election: Dobell
Party	Candidate	Votes	%	±%
Labor	Emma McBride	42,093	41.49	−1.39
Liberal	Jilly Pilon	41,326	40.73	+2.89
Greens	Scott Rickard	7,579	7.47	+1.67
United Australia	Aaron Harpley-Carr	5,411	5.33	+5.33
Independent	Gregory Stephenson	3,176	3.13	+1.91
Christian Democrats	Paula Grundy	1,868	1.84	−0.80
Total formal votes		101,453	94.03	−0.17
Informal votes		6,439	5.97	+0.17
Turnout		107,892	92.05	+0.11
Two-party-preferred result
Labor	Emma McBride	52,244	51.50	−3.31
Liberal	Jilly Pilon	49,209	48.50	+3.31
Labor hold		Swing	−3.31	

=== Eden-Monaro ===
2019 Australian federal election: Eden-Monaro
Party	Candidate	Votes	%	±%
Labor	Mike Kelly	38,878	39.17	−2.71
Liberal	Fiona Kotvojs	36,732	37.01	−4.33
Greens	Pat McGinlay	8,715	8.78	+1.18
National	Sophie Wade	6,899	6.95	+6.95
United Australia	Chandra Singh	2,748	2.77	+2.77
Independent	David Sheldon	2,247	2.26	+2.26
Independent	James Holgate	1,883	1.90	+1.90
Christian Democrats	Thomas Harris	1,157	1.17	−0.70
Total formal votes		99,259	93.20	−0.46
Informal votes		7,246	6.80	+0.46
Turnout		106,505	93.31	−0.24
Two-party-preferred result
Labor	Mike Kelly	50,472	50.85	−2.08
Liberal	Fiona Kotvojs	48,787	49.15	+2.08
Labor hold		Swing	−2.08	

=== Farrer ===
2019 Australian federal election: Farrer
Party	Candidate	Votes	%	±%
Liberal	Sussan Ley	49,316	50.71	−7.16
Independent	Kevin Mack	19,926	20.49	+20.49
Labor	Kieran Drabsch	14,236	14.64	−3.47
Greens	Dean Moss	4,529	4.66	−3.56
United Australia	Michael Rose	4,147	4.26	+4.26
Sustainable Australia	Ross Hamilton	1,429	1.47	+1.47
Christian Democrats	Philip Langfield	1,327	1.36	−2.24
Independent	Brian Mills	1,255	1.29	−2.99
Liberal Democrats	Mark Ellis	1,084	1.11	+1.11
Total formal votes		97,249	90.87	−2.73
Informal votes		9,768	9.13	+2.73
Turnout		107,017	92.64	+0.01
Notional two-party-preferred count
Liberal	Sussan Ley	67,908	69.83	−0.70
Labor	Kieran Drabsch	29,341	30.17	+0.70
Two-candidate-preferred result
Liberal	Sussan Ley	59,260	60.94	−9.59
Independent	Kevin Mack	37,989	39.06	+39.06
Liberal hold		Swing	N/A	

=== Fowler ===
2019 Australian federal election: Fowler
Party	Candidate	Votes	%	±%
Labor	Chris Hayes	45,627	54.54	−6.28
Liberal	Wayne Blewitt	25,137	30.05	+4.32
Christian Democrats	Francesca Mocanu	4,643	5.55	−0.10
Greens	Seamus Lee	4,633	5.54	−0.67
United Australia	Joshua Jabbour	3,624	4.33	+4.33
Total formal votes		83,664	86.89	−2.70
Informal votes		12,624	13.11	+2.70
Turnout		96,288	90.04	+0.31
Two-party-preferred result
Labor	Chris Hayes	53,540	63.99	−3.50
Liberal	Wayne Blewitt	30,124	36.01	+3.50
Labor hold		Swing	−3.50	

=== Gilmore ===
2019 Australian federal election: Gilmore
Party	Candidate	Votes	%	±%
Labor	Fiona Phillips	38,972	36.19	−3.04
Liberal	Warren Mundine	31,427	29.19	−16.09
National	Katrina Hodgkinson	13,462	12.50	+12.50
Greens	Carmel McCallum	10,740	9.97	−0.52
Independent	Grant Schultz	7,585	7.04	+7.04
United Australia	Milton Leslight	3,638	3.38	+3.38
Christian Democrats	Serah Kolukulapally	1,853	1.72	−3.28
Total formal votes		107,677	94.75	−1.12
Informal votes		5,970	5.25	+1.12
Turnout		113,647	92.88	+0.01
Two-party-preferred result
Labor	Fiona Phillips	56,652	52.61	+3.34
Liberal	Warren Mundine	51,025	47.39	−3.34
Labor gain from Liberal		Swing	+3.34	

=== Grayndler ===
2019 Australian federal election: Grayndler
Party	Candidate	Votes	%	±%
Labor	Anthony Albanese	48,728	50.86	+4.79
Greens	Jim Casey	21,607	22.55	+0.31
Liberal	Derek Henderson	20,846	21.76	−1.55
Science	Majella Morello	2,613	2.73	+1.41
United Australia	Paris King-Orsborn	1,155	1.21	+1.21
Christian Democrats	Gui Dong Cao	865	0.90	−0.33
Total formal votes		95,814	95.75	+2.48
Informal votes		4,258	4.25	−2.48
Turnout		100,072	91.33	+2.05
Notional two-party-preferred count
Labor	Anthony Albanese	70,739	73.83	+1.47
Liberal	Derek Henderson	25,075	26.17	−1.47
Two-candidate-preferred result
Labor	Anthony Albanese	63,529	66.30	+0.48
Greens	Jim Casey	32,285	33.70	−0.48
Labor hold		Swing	+0.48	

=== Greenway ===
2019 Australian federal election: Greenway
Party	Candidate	Votes	%	±%
Labor	Michelle Rowland	43,901	45.97	−3.11
Liberal	Allan Green	38,759	40.58	+6.17
Greens	Damien Atkins	5,256	5.50	+1.74
United Australia	Scott Feeney	2,853	2.99	+2.99
Christian Democrats	Osbourn Rajadurai	2,666	2.79	−2.24
Better Families	Graham McFarland	2,072	2.17	+2.17
Total formal votes		95,507	93.24	+0.80
Informal votes		6,925	6.76	−0.80
Turnout		102,432	92.87	+0.55
Two-party-preferred result
Labor	Michelle Rowland	50,425	52.80	−3.51
Liberal	Allan Green	45,082	47.20	+3.51
Labor hold		Swing	−3.51	

=== Hughes ===
2019 Australian federal election: Hughes
Party	Candidate	Votes	%	±%
Liberal	Craig Kelly	50,763	53.16	+1.19
Labor	Diedree Steinwall	29,088	30.46	−1.42
Greens	Mitchell Shakespeare	6,631	6.94	−0.43
Animal Justice	Gae Constable	2,439	2.55	−1.44
United Australia	Terrance Keep	2,366	2.48	+2.48
Christian Democrats	Leo-Ning Liu	2,216	2.32	−2.47
Independent	Matt Bryan	1,988	2.08	+2.08
Total formal votes		95,491	94.83	−0.77
Informal votes		5,208	5.17	+0.77
Turnout		100,699	94.82	+0.88
Two-party-preferred result
Liberal	Craig Kelly	57,149	59.85	+0.52
Labor	Diedree Steinwall	38,342	40.15	−0.52
Liberal hold		Swing	+0.52	

=== Hume ===
2019 Australian federal election: Hume
Party	Candidate	Votes	%	±%
Liberal	Angus Taylor	54,589	53.29	−0.54
Labor	Aoife Champion	27,223	26.57	−5.27
Independent	Huw Kingston	6,068	5.92	+5.92
Greens	David Powell	5,224	5.10	−1.51
United Australia	Lynda Abdo	4,939	4.82	+4.82
Conservative National	Tanya Hargraves	2,493	2.43	+2.43
Christian Democrats	Ian Nebauer	1,906	1.86	−1.86
Total formal votes		102,442	93.54	−1.16
Informal votes		7,080	6.46	+1.16
Turnout		109,522	94.09	+0.52
Two-party-preferred result
Liberal	Angus Taylor	64,527	62.99	+2.81
Labor	Aoife Champion	37,915	37.01	−2.81
Liberal hold		Swing	+2.81	

=== Hunter ===
2019 Australian federal election: Hunter
Party	Candidate	Votes	%	±%
Labor	Joel Fitzgibbon	38,331	37.57	−14.22
National	Josh Angus	23,942	23.47	−2.87
One Nation	Stuart Bonds	22,029	21.59	+21.59
Greens	Janet Murray	7,007	6.87	−0.22
United Australia	Paul Davies	4,407	4.32	+4.32
Animal Justice	James Murphy	3,267	3.20	+3.20
Christian Democrats	Richard Stretton	2,356	2.31	−1.07
Socialist Equality	Max Boddy	687	0.67	+0.67
Total formal votes		102,026	91.03	−1.09
Informal votes		10,049	8.97	+1.09
Turnout		112,075	92.29	−0.04
Two-party-preferred result
Labor	Joel Fitzgibbon	54,050	52.98	−9.48
National	Josh Angus	47,976	47.02	+9.48
Labor hold		Swing	−9.48	

=== Kingsford Smith ===
2019 Australian federal election: Kingsford Smith
Party	Candidate	Votes	%	±%
Labor	Matt Thistlethwaite	42,629	45.17	−2.20
Liberal	Amanda Wilmot	34,380	36.43	−1.11
Greens	James Cruz	11,418	12.10	+1.57
United Australia	Adam Watson	1,649	1.75	+1.75
Science	James Jansson	1,595	1.69	−0.54
Christian Democrats	Adrian Manson	1,359	1.44	−0.89
Sustainable Australia	Petra Campbell	1,346	1.43	+1.43
Total formal votes		94,376	94.21	−0.79
Informal votes		5,805	5.79	+0.79
Turnout		100,181	90.17	+0.93
Two-party-preferred result
Labor	Matt Thistlethwaite	55,501	58.81	+0.24
Liberal	Amanda Wilmot	38,875	41.19	−0.24
Labor hold		Swing	+0.24	

=== Lindsay ===
2019 Australian federal election: Lindsay
Party	Candidate	Votes	%	±%
Liberal	Melissa McIntosh	45,247	46.45	+7.16
Labor	Diane Beamer	34,690	35.61	−5.47
Greens	Nick Best	4,781	4.91	+1.33
United Australia	Christopher Buttel	2,831	2.91	+2.91
Independent	Mark Tyndall	2,785	2.86	+2.86
Conservative National	Brandon Lees	2,374	2.44	+2.44
Christian Democrats	Mark Moody-Basedow	1,997	2.05	−0.98
Australia First	Jim Saleam	1,372	1.41	+0.21
Sustainable Australia	Geoff Brown	1,326	1.36	+1.36
Total formal votes		97,403	88.92	+0.69
Informal votes		12,135	11.08	−0.69
Turnout		109,538	92.26	+0.03
Two-party-preferred result
Liberal	Melissa McIntosh	53,614	55.04	+6.15
Labor	Diane Beamer	43,789	44.96	−6.15
Liberal gain from Labor		Swing	+6.15	

=== Lyne ===
2019 Australian federal election: Lyne
Party	Candidate	Votes	%	±%
National	David Gillespie	49,934	49.35	−0.22
Labor	Phil Costa	24,371	24.09	−2.47
Greens	Stuart Watson	6,589	6.51	−2.93
Liberal Democrats	Dean McCrae	5,864	5.80	+5.80
Independent	Jeremy Miller	5,169	5.11	+5.11
United Australia	Garry Bourke	4,098	4.05	+4.05
Conservative National	Ryan Goldspring	1,986	1.96	+1.96
Australian Workers	Ed Caruana	1,676	1.66	+1.66
Christian Democrats	Catherine Zhao	1,493	1.48	−1.56
Total formal votes		101,180	90.93	−4.48
Informal votes		10,096	9.07	+4.48
Turnout		111,276	93.73	+0.29
Two-party-preferred result
National	David Gillespie	65,942	65.17	+3.54
Labor	Phil Costa	35,238	34.83	−3.54
National hold		Swing	+3.54	

=== Macarthur ===
2019 Australian federal election: Macarthur
Party	Candidate	Votes	%	±%
Labor	Mike Freelander	47,539	47.78	−4.10
Liberal	Riley Munro	30,696	30.85	−5.00
One Nation	Shane Norman	8,555	8.60	+8.60
Greens	Jayden Rivera	4,397	4.42	+0.15
Christian Democrats	James Gent	3,705	3.72	−0.59
United Australia	Nathan Murphy	2,506	2.52	+2.52
Animal Justice	Matt Stellino	2,106	2.12	+2.12
Total formal votes		99,504	91.15	−2.23
Informal votes		9,663	8.85	+2.23
Turnout		109,167	91.66	−0.17
Two-party-preferred result
Labor	Mike Freelander	58,110	58.40	+0.07
Liberal	Riley Munro	41,394	41.60	−0.07
Labor hold		Swing	+0.07	

=== Mackellar ===
2019 Australian federal election: Mackellar
Party	Candidate	Votes	%	±%
Liberal	Jason Falinski	52,088	53.01	+1.84
Labor	Declan Steele	16,648	16.94	−0.38
Independent	Alice Thompson	11,975	12.19	+12.19
Greens	Pru Wawn	11,283	11.48	−2.57
Sustainable Australia	Suzanne Daly	2,550	2.60	+2.60
United Australia	David Lyon	2,317	2.36	+2.36
Christian Democrats	Greg Levett	1,401	1.43	−1.13
Total formal votes		98,262	95.29	+0.55
Informal votes		4,857	4.71	−0.55
Turnout		103,119	93.05	+1.39
Two-party-preferred result
Liberal	Jason Falinski	62,124	63.22	−2.52
Labor	Declan Steele	36,138	36.78	+2.52
Liberal hold		Swing	−2.52	

=== Macquarie ===
2019 Australian federal election: Macquarie
Party	Candidate	Votes	%	±%
Liberal	Sarah Richards	43,487	44.85	+6.64
Labor	Susan Templeman	37,106	38.27	+2.75
Greens	Kingsley Liu	8,870	9.15	−2.07
United Australia	Tony Pettitt	3,877	4.00	+4.00
Animal Justice	Greg Keightley	3,611	3.72	+0.93
Total formal votes		96,951	95.72	+2.25
Informal votes		4,338	4.28	−2.25
Turnout		101,289	93.82	+0.44
Two-party-preferred result
Labor	Susan Templeman	48,661	50.19	−2.00
Liberal	Sarah Richards	48,290	49.81	+2.00
Labor hold		Swing	−2.00	

=== McMahon ===
2019 Australian federal election: McMahon
Party	Candidate	Votes	%	±%
Labor	Chris Bowen	39,351	46.08	−7.36
Liberal	Vivek Singha	28,441	33.31	+3.26
One Nation	Damian Commane	7,046	8.25	+8.25
Greens	Astrid O'Neill	4,218	4.94	−0.48
United Australia	Meg Wrightson	3,329	3.90	+3.90
Christian Democrats	Zeeshan Francis	3,008	3.52	−3.68
Total formal votes		85,393	87.92	−2.19
Informal votes		11,731	12.08	+2.19
Turnout		97,124	90.98	+1.04
Two-party-preferred result
Labor	Chris Bowen	48,364	56.64	−5.47
Liberal	Vivek Singha	37,029	43.36	+5.47
Labor hold		Swing	−5.47	

=== Mitchell ===
2019 Australian federal election: Mitchell
Party	Candidate	Votes	%	±%
Liberal	Alex Hawke	61,202	62.05	+1.56
Labor	Immanuel Selvaraj	23,618	23.94	−0.67
Greens	Lawrence Murphy	7,955	8.07	+0.08
Christian Democrats	Craig L Hall	3,156	3.20	−3.71
United Australia	Roy Hoppenbrouwer	2,705	2.74	+2.74
Total formal votes		98,636	94.96	−0.53
Informal votes		5,234	5.04	+0.53
Turnout		103,870	94.13	+0.87
Two-party-preferred result
Liberal	Alex Hawke	67,698	68.63	+0.81
Labor	Immanuel Selvaraj	30,938	31.37	−0.81
Liberal hold		Swing	+0.81	

=== New England ===
2019 Australian federal election: New England
Party	Candidate	Votes	%	±%
National	Barnaby Joyce	53,348	54.82	+2.53
Independent	Adam Blakester	13,804	14.18	+14.18
Labor	Yvonne Langenberg	12,410	12.75	+5.74
United Australia	Cindy Duncan	4,459	4.58	+4.58
Greens	Tony Lonergan	4,311	4.43	+1.51
Independent	Rob Taber	3,702	3.80	+1.00
Independent	Natasha Ledger	3,071	3.16	+3.16
Christian Democrats	Julie Collins	2,215	2.28	+0.89
Total formal votes		97,320	93.18	+0.22
Informal votes		7,120	6.82	−0.22
Turnout		104,440	93.34	−0.03
Notional two-party-preferred count
National	Barnaby Joyce	65,818	67.63	+1.21
Labor	Yvonne Langenberg	31,502	32.37	−1.21
Two-candidate-preferred result
National	Barnaby Joyce	62,637	64.36	−9.27
Independent	Adam Blakester	34,683	35.64	+35.64
National hold		Swing	N/A	

=== Newcastle ===
2019 Australian federal election: Newcastle
Party	Candidate	Votes	%	±%
Labor	Sharon Claydon	47,137	45.73	−1.39
Liberal	Katrina Wark	30,107	29.21	−0.71
Greens	John Mackenzie	16,038	15.56	+1.90
United Australia	Geoffrey Scully	3,471	3.37	+3.37
Animal Justice	Darren Brollo	3,300	3.20	+3.20
Christian Democrats	Pam Wise	1,928	1.87	−0.28
Great Australian	Barry Futter	1,086	1.05	+1.05
Total formal votes		103,067	94.49	−0.77
Informal votes		6,014	5.51	+0.77
Turnout		109,081	92.72	+0.80
Two-party-preferred result
Labor	Sharon Claydon	65,784	63.83	−0.01
Liberal	Katrina Wark	37,283	36.17	+0.01
Labor hold		Swing	−0.01	

=== North Sydney ===
2019 Australian federal election: North Sydney
Party	Candidate	Votes	%	±%
Liberal	Trent Zimmerman	50,319	51.96	+0.47
Labor	Brett Stone	24,289	25.08	+8.28
Greens	Daniel Keogh	13,193	13.62	+0.60
Independent	Arthur Chesterfield-Evans	4,295	4.44	+4.44
Sustainable Australia	Greg Graham	1,831	1.89	+1.89
Christian Democrats	David Vernon	1,660	1.71	−0.34
United Australia	Peter Vagg	1,249	1.29	+1.29
Total formal votes		96,836	95.96	+0.72
Informal votes		4,077	4.04	−0.72
Turnout		100,913	92.40	+1.69
Two-party-preferred result
Liberal	Trent Zimmerman	57,398	59.27	−4.34
Labor	Brett Stone	39,438	40.73	+4.34
Liberal hold		Swing	−4.34	

=== Page ===
2019 Australian federal election: Page
Party	Candidate	Votes	%	±%
National	Kevin Hogan	53,672	49.63	+5.35
Labor	Patrick Deegan	28,507	26.36	−8.50
Greens	Dan Reid	12,634	11.68	+0.54
Independent	Fiona Leviny	5,240	4.85	+4.85
United Australia	John Mudge	3,460	3.20	+3.20
Animal Justice	Alison Waters	2,646	2.45	−0.40
Christian Democrats	Peter Walker	1,992	1.84	−1.01
Total formal votes		108,151	95.25	−0.91
Informal votes		5,397	4.75	+0.91
Turnout		113,548	92.53	−0.25
Two-party-preferred result
National	Kevin Hogan	64,295	59.45	+7.15
Labor	Patrick Deegan	43,856	40.55	−7.15
National hold		Swing	+7.15	

=== Parkes ===
2019 Australian federal election: Parkes
Party	Candidate	Votes	%	±%
National	Mark Coulton	47,692	50.76	−7.89
Labor	Jack Ayoub	22,135	23.56	−5.01
Liberal Democrats	Daniel Jones	7,568	8.06	+8.06
Independent	Will Landers	6,730	7.16	+7.16
United Australia	Petrus van der Steen	5,906	6.29	+6.29
Greens	David Paull	3,921	4.17	−2.08
Total formal votes		93,952	94.14	−0.62
Informal votes		5,847	5.86	+0.62
Turnout		99,799	91.13	−0.82
Two-party-preferred result
National	Mark Coulton	62,859	66.91	+1.81
Labor	Jack Ayoub	31,093	33.09	−1.81
National hold		Swing	+1.81	

=== Parramatta ===
2019 Australian federal election: Parramatta
Party	Candidate	Votes	%	±%
Labor	Julie Owens	38,171	45.08	−1.38
Liberal	Charles Camenzuli	34,954	41.28	+6.91
Greens	Phil Bradley	6,131	7.24	+0.36
Christian Democrats	Asma Payara	2,526	2.98	−2.32
United Australia	Ganesh Loke	2,186	2.58	+2.58
Socialist Equality	Oscar Grenfell	702	0.83	+0.83
Total formal votes		84,670	91.63	+0.89
Informal votes		7,739	8.37	−0.89
Turnout		92,409	89.61	+0.59
Two-party-preferred result
Labor	Julie Owens	45,302	53.50	−4.17
Liberal	Charles Camenzuli	39,368	46.50	+4.17
Labor hold		Swing	−4.17	

=== Paterson ===
2019 Australian federal election: Paterson
Party	Candidate	Votes	%	±%
Labor	Meryl Swanson	44,288	41.08	−4.98
Liberal	Sachin Joshi	35,059	32.52	+1.01
One Nation	Neil Turner	15,269	14.16	+1.11
Greens	Jan Davis	7,439	6.90	+1.11
United Australia	Graham Burston	3,888	3.61	+3.61
Christian Democrats	Christopher Vale	1,876	1.74	−0.32
Total formal votes		107,819	94.15	−0.96
Informal votes		6,694	5.85	+0.96
Turnout		114,513	93.24	−0.25
Two-party-preferred result
Labor	Meryl Swanson	59,348	55.04	−5.70
Liberal	Sachin Joshi	48,471	44.96	+5.70
Labor hold		Swing	−5.70	

=== Reid ===
2019 Australian federal election: Reid
Party	Candidate	Votes	%	±%
Liberal	Fiona Martin	45,288	48.32	−0.48
Labor	Sam Crosby	34,872	37.21	+0.88
Greens	Charles Jago	7,575	8.08	−0.39
Christian Democrats	Keith Piper	2,335	2.49	−1.61
Animal Justice	Rohan Laxmanalal	1,861	1.99	+1.99
United Australia	Young Lee	1,797	1.92	+1.92
Total formal votes		93,728	93.87	−1.15
Informal votes		6,119	6.13	+1.15
Turnout		99,847	91.71	+1.30
Two-party-preferred result
Liberal	Fiona Martin	49,844	53.18	−1.51
Labor	Sam Crosby	43,884	46.82	+1.51
Liberal hold		Swing	−1.51	

=== Richmond ===
2019 Australian federal election: Richmond
Party	Candidate	Votes	%	±%
National	Matthew Fraser	36,979	36.86	−0.75
Labor	Justine Elliot	31,807	31.71	+0.66
Greens	Michael Lyon	20,384	20.32	−0.12
United Australia	Hamish Mitchell	3,913	3.90	+3.90
Sustainable Australia	Ronald McDonald	3,154	3.14	+3.14
Independent	Ray Karam	1,566	1.56	+1.56
Christian Democrats	Morgan Cox	1,338	1.33	−0.18
Involuntary Medication Objectors	Tom Barnett	1,179	1.18	+1.18
Total formal votes		100,320	92.56	−3.77
Informal votes		8,061	7.44	+3.77
Turnout		108,381	90.82	+0.20
Two-party-preferred result
Labor	Justine Elliot	54,251	54.08	+0.12
National	Matthew Fraser	46,069	45.92	−0.12
Labor hold		Swing	+0.12	

=== Riverina ===
2019 Australian federal election: Riverina
Party	Candidate	Votes	%	±%
National	Michael McCormack	60,493	59.93	+2.73
Labor	Mark Jeffreson	23,380	23.16	−2.36
United Australia	Richard Foley	10,814	10.71	+10.71
Greens	Michael Bayles	6,254	6.20	+1.71
Total formal votes		100,941	94.84	−0.55
Informal votes		5,489	5.16	+0.55
Turnout		106,430	93.39	−0.02
Two-party-preferred result
National	Michael McCormack	70,136	69.48	+3.04
Labor	Mark Jeffreson	30,805	30.52	−3.04
National hold		Swing	+3.04	

=== Robertson ===
2019 Australian federal election: Robertson
Party	Candidate	Votes	%	±%
Liberal	Lucy Wicks	45,011	46.86	+2.18
Labor	Anne Charlton	32,761	34.10	−4.33
Greens	Cath Connor	7,601	7.91	−0.44
Independent	David Abrahams	2,915	3.03	+3.03
United Australia	Robert Marks	2,702	2.81	+2.81
Animal Justice	Sean Bremner Young	2,000	2.08	+2.08
Sustainable Australia	Judy Singer	1,719	1.79	+1.79
Christian Democrats	Fiona Stucken	1,352	1.41	−1.25
Total formal votes		96,061	92.76	−2.21
Informal votes		7,493	7.24	+2.21
Turnout		103,554	93.17	+0.65
Two-party-preferred result
Liberal	Lucy Wicks	52,100	54.24	+3.10
Labor	Anne Charlton	43,961	45.76	−3.10
Liberal hold		Swing	+3.10	

=== Shortland ===
2019 Australian federal election: Shortland
Party	Candidate	Votes	%	±%
Labor	Pat Conroy	41,126	41.13	−10.04
Liberal	Nell McGill	37,363	37.37	+2.17
Greens	Wylie Campbell	8,256	8.26	−1.20
United Australia	Dani Rifai	4,532	4.53	+4.53
Animal Justice	Bryan McGrath	3,596	3.60	+3.60
Sustainable Australia	Susan Newbury	3,097	3.10	+3.10
Christian Democrats	Xing Yu	2,010	2.01	−2.15
Total formal votes		99,980	93.59	−1.70
Informal votes		6,847	6.41	+1.70
Turnout		106,827	93.66	+0.21
Two-party-preferred result
Labor	Pat Conroy	54,437	54.45	−5.49
Liberal	Nell McGill	45,543	45.55	+5.49
Labor hold		Swing	−5.49	

=== Sydney ===
2019 Australian federal election: Sydney
Party	Candidate	Votes	%	±%
Labor	Tanya Plibersek	46,850	49.41	+5.67
Liberal	Jacqui Munro	25,230	26.61	−2.54
Greens	Matthew Thompson	17,134	18.07	−0.74
Science	Aaron Hammond	3,240	3.42	+1.87
United Australia	Adam Holt	1,366	1.44	+1.44
Christian Democrats	Rebecca Reddin	995	1.05	−0.64
Total formal votes		94,815	96.19	+2.18
Informal votes		3,754	3.81	−2.18
Turnout		98,569	86.30	+1.53
Two-party-preferred result
Labor	Tanya Plibersek	65,110	68.67	+3.36
Liberal	Jacqui Munro	29,705	31.33	−3.36
Labor hold		Swing	+3.36	

=== Warringah ===
2019 Australian federal election: Warringah
Party	Candidate	Votes	%	±%
Independent	Zali Steggall	40,034	43.46	+43.46
Liberal	Tony Abbott	35,935	39.01	−12.64
Labor	Dean Harris	6,091	6.61	−8.18
Greens	Kristyn Glanville	5,647	6.13	−6.06
Animal Justice	Heather Barnes	1,291	1.40	+1.40
Independent	Susan Moylan	1,111	1.21	+1.21
Sustainable Australia	Emanuele Paletto	678	0.74	+0.74
United Australia	Suellen Wrightson	625	0.68	+0.68
Christian Democrats	Jason Blaiklock	461	0.50	−0.70
Conservative National	Brian Clare	250	0.27	+0.27
Total formal votes		92,123	94.95	+1.03
Informal votes		4,897	5.05	−1.03
Turnout		97,020	92.40	+2.50
Notional two-party-preferred count
Liberal	Tony Abbott	48,011	52.12	−8.97
Labor	Dean Harris	44,112	47.88	+8.97
Two-candidate-preferred result
Independent	Zali Steggall	52,728	57.24	+57.24
Liberal	Tony Abbott	39,395	42.76	−18.79
Independent gain from Liberal		Swing	N/A	

=== Watson ===
2019 Australian federal election: Watson
Party	Candidate	Votes	%	±%
Labor	Tony Burke	43,550	51.69	−3.70
Liberal	Mohammad Zaman	24,769	29.40	+4.01
Greens	Emmet de Bhaldraithe	5,982	7.10	+0.43
Christian Democrats	Karl Schubert	4,522	5.37	−4.19
United Australia	Dean Wrightson	3,549	4.21	+4.21
Science	Raymond Zeng	1,878	2.23	+0.29
Total formal votes		84,250	87.39	−1.96
Informal votes		12,159	12.61	+1.96
Turnout		96,409	89.45	+1.08
Two-party-preferred result
Labor	Tony Burke	53,518	63.52	−4.06
Liberal	Mohammad Zaman	30,732	36.48	+4.06
Labor hold		Swing	−4.06	

=== Wentworth ===
2019 Australian federal election: Wentworth
Party	Candidate	Votes	%	±%
Liberal	Dave Sharma	42,575	47.44	−14.82
Independent	Kerryn Phelps	29,109	32.43	+32.43
Labor	Tim Murray	9,824	10.95	−6.78
Greens	Dominic Wy Kanak	6,759	7.53	−7.33
United Australia	Michael Bloomfield	625	0.70	+0.70
Independent	Matthew Drake-Brockman	516	0.57	+0.57
Christian Democrats	Paul Treacy	346	0.39	−0.68
Total formal votes		89,754	97.01	+2.14
Informal votes		2,771	2.99	−2.14
Turnout		92,525	89.40	+3.16
Notional two-party-preferred count
Liberal	Dave Sharma	53,716	59.85	−7.90
Labor	Tim Murray	36,038	40.15	+7.90
Two-candidate-preferred result
Liberal	Dave Sharma	46,050	51.31	−16.44
Independent	Kerryn Phelps	43,704	48.69	+48.69
Liberal hold		Swing	−16.44	

Malcolm Turnbull (Liberal) had won the seat at the 2016 election, however he resigned in 2018 and Kerryn Phelps (Independent) won the seat at the resulting by-election.

=== Werriwa ===
2019 Australian federal election: Werriwa
Party	Candidate	Votes	%	±%
Labor	Anne Stanley	45,002	47.76	−4.38
Liberal	Shayne Miller	33,234	35.27	−1.29
Greens	Signe Westerberg	5,060	5.37	+0.77
Christian Democrats	Narelle Storey	4,841	5.14	−1.56
United Australia	Ignatios Tsiriplis	3,957	4.20	+4.20
Independent	Michael White	2,135	2.27	+2.27
Total formal votes		94,229	88.43	−2.81
Informal votes		12,324	11.57	+2.81
Turnout		106,553	90.53	+0.31
Two-party-preferred result
Labor	Anne Stanley	52,270	55.47	−2.73
Liberal	Shayne Miller	41,959	44.53	+2.73
Labor hold		Swing	−2.73	

=== Whitlam ===
2019 Australian federal election: Whitlam
Party	Candidate	Votes	%	±%
Labor	Stephen Jones	50,102	48.80	−3.96
National	Stephen Wentworth	26,145	25.48	+19.04
Greens	Jamie Dixon	9,461	9.22	+0.93
United Australia	Angelo Cuda	9,071	8.84	+8.84
Christian Democrats	Frank Nero	4,214	4.11	0.00
Sustainable Australia	Ken Davis	3,678	3.58	+3.58
Total formal votes		102,671	92.75	−1.84
Informal votes		8,020	7.25	+1.84
Turnout		110,691	93.26	+0.38
Two-party-preferred result
Labor	Stephen Jones	62,541	60.91	−2.81
National	Stephen Wentworth	40,130	39.09	+39.09
Labor hold		Swing	N/A	
