= Sally Sitou =

Australian politician

Sally Sitou MP
- 陈莎莉
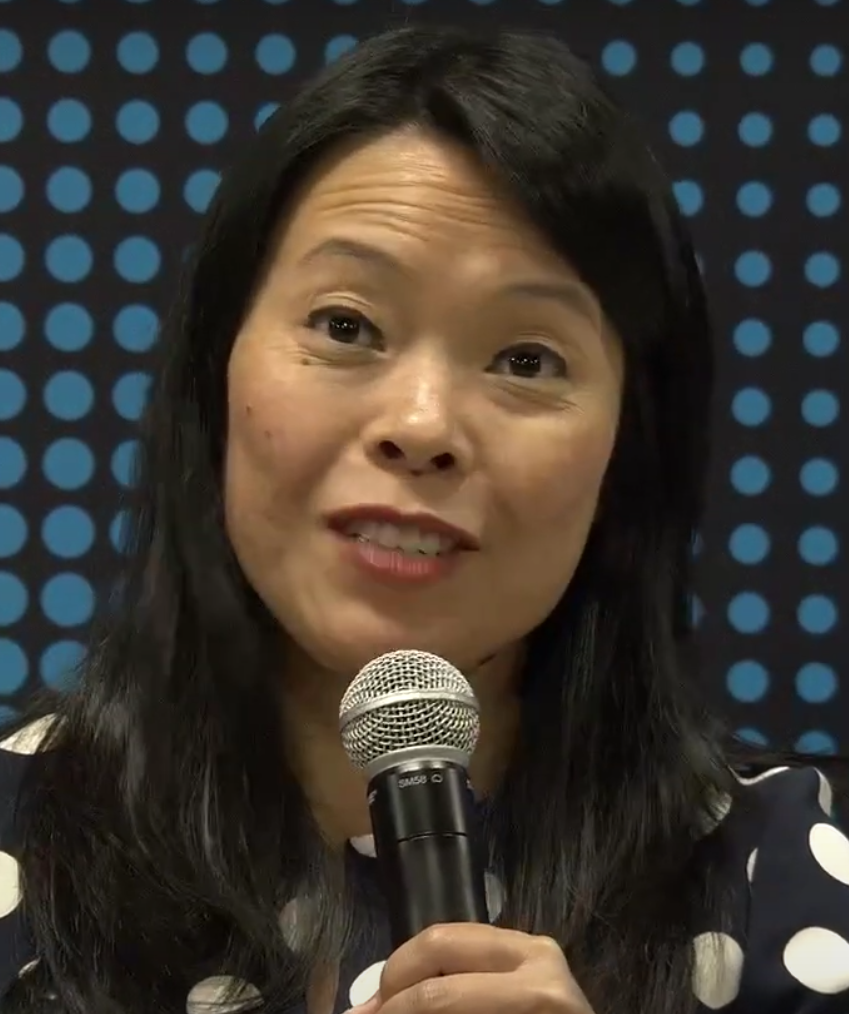
- Sitou in 2023

Member of the Australian Parliament for Reid
- Incumbent
- Assumed office 21 May 2022
- Preceded by: Fiona Martin

Personal details
- Born: 24 September 1982 (age 43) Canley Vale, New South Wales, Australia
- Party: Labor
- Children: 1
- Website: https://sallysitou.com/

Sally Sitou (born 24 September 1982) is an Australian politician. She currently serves as a member of parliament for the Australian Labor Party, representing the western Sydney seat of Reid.

She was elected at the 2022 Australian federal election, defeating the incumbent Liberal member, Fiona Martin.

== Early life ==
Sitou was born in Canley Vale, New South Wales, the second child of Chinese Laotian parents who fled Laos after the Vietnam War.

She attended Canley Vale Public School and Sefton High School, completing a bachelor degree in Psychology at Macquarie University in 2005. Following this, she worked in international development and international education for more than ten years, including a period of time at the Department of Foreign Affairs. Prior to becoming a politician, she was a doctoral researcher at the University of Sydney.

== Politics ==
Sitou joined the Australian Labor Party in 2006 and worked on the 2007 Bennelong campaign in which Maxine McKew defeated sitting prime minister John Howard. She also worked as an adviser to Jason Clare, member for Blaxland.

In 2021, Sitou was preselected as the Labor candidate for the Division of Reid. She achieved a swing of 8.4 percent to win the seat in the May 2022 federal election.

== Personal life ==
Sitou is married and has one child.

Australian House of Representatives
Preceded by Fiona Martin	Member for Reid; 2022–present	Incumbent
