= Laffer =

Laffer may refer to:

- Laffer, South Australia, locality
- Arthur Laffer (born 1940), American economist
- George Laffer (1866–1933), South Australian politician
- Jae Laffer, Australian rock singer-songwriter
- Larry Laffer, a fictional character from the Leisure Suit Larry game series

== See also ==
- Lafer, surname
- Laugher (disambiguation)
