= Giggles (bookshop) =

Book shop

Giggles is a noted small book shop run by Nalini Chettur in Chennai, India. It used to be located in the premises of the Taj Connemara Hotel and has been described as "the biggest little bookshop" of Chennai. Giggles has moved out of Taj Connemara since August 2018. Nalini Chettur plans to identify a new location for the bookshop in the near future.

Giggles was started by Chettur in 1974 on a ₹ 1,000 investment. It functioned in the lobby of the Taj Connemara until being evicted from there by the hotel management in 1994. It now functions in a strip of shops in the hotel's parking lot. It occupies a room about 100 square feet in size and specialises in books on India. Giggles and Chettur are well known in the Chennai English literary circles. It has been listed as a "must see" place in Chennai by Lonely Planet. In 2003, Chettur was given the Best Bookseller Award by the Booksellers and Publishers Association of South India (BAPASI).
