= Latin American Fisheries Fellowship =

- School: Bren School of Environmental Science & Management
- University: University of California, Santa Barbara
- Location: Santa Barbara, California, United States
- Website: http://www.laff.bren.ucsb.edu/

The Latin American Fisheries Fellowship (LAFF) program is a fellowship at the University of California, Santa Barbara's Bren School of Environmental Science & Management for early-career and aspiring marine environmental professionals dedicated marine resource management in Latin America. Fellows earn a Master of Environmental Science and Management, specializing in Coastal Marine Resources Management. The program accepts between three and five fellows each year.

== Origin ==
The Latin American Fisheries Fellowship program accepted its first fellows in the fall of 2011. The program continues to be supported by its original funder, the Walton Foundation.

== Mission ==
The program's mission is to train a new generation of interdisciplinary marine resource managers and conservation professionals, and to accelerate their impact towards solving environmental challenges throughout Latin America. The broader goal of the program is to build a high-impact network anchored with innovative environmental leaders that champions ocean management across Latin America that achieves healthy ecosystems, abundant fisheries, and thriving coastal communities.

== Program ==
The program provides fellows with up to full fellowship support to earn a Master of Environmental Science and Management (MESM) degree with a concentration in Coastal Marine Resources Management from the University of California, Santa Barbara's Bren School of Environmental Science & Management. The two-year MESM program includes an interdisciplinary, solution-oriented curriculum that includes coursework in science, economics, policy, and law. Students earning the MESM degree must complete a Master's Project, which can be either a Group Project or Eco-Entrepreneurship (Eco-E) Project. Both serve as the master's thesis.

The LAFF program augments the Bren School's interdisciplinary coursework with specialized programming in innovative approaches to sustainable fisheries management and marine conservation through short-courses, seminars, workshops, specialized Master's Projects, and directed research opportunities. Fellows receive career-oriented training, including preparation in collaborative problem solving and development of leadership and project management skills.

== Selection ==
Candidates for the program have a strong academic record and typically have experience and interest in the areas of marine conservation, fisheries sustainability, and/or marine resource management. They must also demonstrate a commitment to pursuing impactful careers in Latin American countries.

Between three and five fellows are selected for the program each year. Fellows have been from a range of countries including Mexico, Costa Rica, Colombia, Venezuela, Ecuador, Peru, Chile, Brazil, and the United States.
