= Sall Grover =

Australian businesswoman (born 1984)

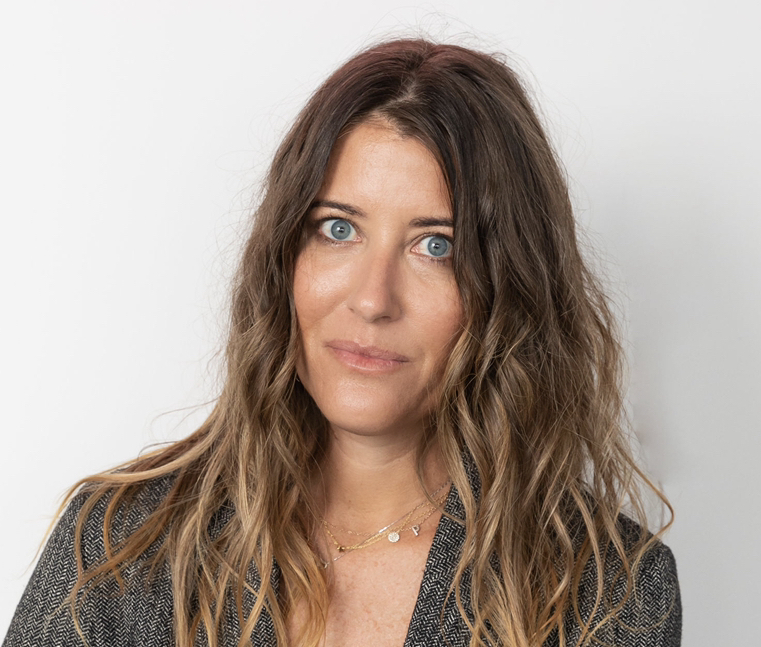
- Born: 11 October 1984 (age 42)
- Education: Bond University
- Occupations: Journalist, writer, app developer
- Known for: Creating Giggle, a social media app for women

Sall Grover (born 11 October 1984) is an Australian businesswoman. She was the founder of Giggle, a now defunct female-only social media app. Giggle was subject to a high-profile legal challenge known as Tickle vs Giggle when a transgender woman had her access to the app revoked.

Prior to creating Giggle, Grover worked in the film industry in Australia and in the United States as a production assistant and as a screenwriter.

== Giggle app ==
In 2020, Grover founded Giggle for Girls, a mobile app designed as a social networking platform for women. The name, Giggle, is described as a collective noun for women. The app claimed to offer a safe online space for women to connect and find support in various areas such as finding roommates, freelancing, emotional support, and activism. Grover has said she was driven to develop a digital platform for women by her desire to guard against the advances of predatory men, a view that was informed by her experience with misogyny and sexual violence.

The app was particularly criticised for excluding transgender women. To verify users' birth sex, it relied on technology developed by Kairos, a company that offers facial recognition software. The software was criticised by Giggle users for failing to identify women of colour as female. In response to criticism, Grover said that the exclusion of trans women was intentional, began self-identifying as a trans-exclusionary radical feminist, and referred to trans women as "males".

By 2021, the app reportedly had 20,000 users from 88 countries.

Grover decided to shut down the app in July 2022. She has alleged that transgender activists have sent numerous rape threats and death threats in relation to the app's membership policy.

== Tickle v Giggle ==
Grover's efforts to create Giggle for Girls led to legal proceedings to determine the legality of the trans-exclusionary membership policies used on the platform. The plaintiff, Roxanne Tickle, a transgender woman from New South Wales, also alleged that Grover had harassed her online after she complained about Giggle's policies. In August 2024, the Federal Court of Australia found that Grover had contravened the Sex Discrimination Act by carrying out indirect discrimination on the basis of gender identity, and ordered "the app" and Grover to pay Tickle A$10,000 plus the legal costs of the plaintiff. In May 2026, the Federal Court, on cross appeal, increased the damages award to A$20,000 and capped the costs of the plaintiff at A$50,000.

== Personal life and early career ==
Grover grew up on the Gold Coast, Queensland. She studied journalism and philosophy at Bond University. She initially worked as a production assistant on a short 2005 film, The Vanished. She then moved to work as an entertainment journalist—first in Australia, then the UK—before moving to Los Angeles to begin to work in the film industry as a screenwriter. Grover collaborated with Australian screenwriter Emma Jensen who had also moved to Los Angeles. Together they wrote a script for a romantic comedy film titled Sex on the First Date, and a novel, The LA Team, for the purpose of adapting to television. After experiencing sexual harassment while working in the American film industry, Grover chose to return to Australia, having had none of her writing projects appear on screen. Encouraged by her mother, she planned to build a social networking app for women.

In July 2022, Grover gave birth to a daughter. Following the birth of her daughter, Grover shared her experience of completing Australia's Medicare forms, where, instead of asking for a "mother's name" it used the gender neutral term "birthing parent". After sharing her experience, the Minister for Government Services, Bill Shorten, reversed the department's naming policy to its previous position, as he wished to defuse public conflict. Grover continues to live on the Gold Coast.

== See also ==
- Katherine Deves
