= Fiona Martin =

Australian politician

Member of the Australian Parliament for Reid
- In office 18 May 2019 – 21 May 2022
- Preceded by: Craig Laundy
- Succeeded by: Sally Sitou

Personal details
- Born: Fiona Barbouttis; 16 November 1977 (age 48) Sydney, New South Wales, Australia
- Party: Liberal (until 2024)
- Parent(s): Kathleen Dashwood and George Barbouttis
- Education: Santa Sabina College and Rosebank College
- Alma mater: University of Sydney
- Profession: Psychologist

Fiona Barbouttis Martin (born in Sydney on 16 November 1977) is an Australian psychologist and politician who served as the Member for Reid from 2019, becoming the first woman to represent the seat. She was defeated for re-election in 2022 by Labor's Sally Sitou.

Before being elected, Martin was an educational and developmental psychologist and small business owner. During the 46th Parliament Martin chaired the first ever Mental Health and Suicide Prevention Committee and made national headlines for being one of five Liberal MPs to vote against the Government in favour of an amendment strengthening protections for vulnerable young people from the LGBTQIA+ community.

After leaving Parliament, Martin returned to private practice and was appointed to The Federal Department of Education’s National Respectful Relationships and Consent Education Expert Working Group . She is also an Ambassador and Expert Advisor for Australians for Mental Health and the Little Blue Dinosaur Foundation.

== Early years and background ==
Martin is the daughter of Kathleen Dashwood and George Barbouttis. Her parents and maternal grandparents were born in Australia, while her paternal grandparents were Greek migrants to Australia from the island of Kastellorizo. Martin grew up in Campsie, Earlwood and Concord West, attending Santa Sabina College in Strathfield and then Rosebank College in Five Dock.

Martin graduated from the University of Sydney with a doctorate in psychology and owned a psychology practice that has rooms in Mosman and Gladesville. Her PhD thesis was titled "Self-understanding in high-functioning males with autism spectrum disorders: relationship with social functioning and theory of mind".

== Political career ==
In mid-March 2019, the then incumbent member for Reid, Craig Laundy, announced that he would not be standing at the 2019 election. Early the following month, Martin was nominated for the seat by the Liberal Party, being described as a "captain's pick". Martin's preselection faced a backlash among conservative elements of the Liberal Party, due in part to former statements of Martin's that supported pill testing, abortion and Trump-opposing US politicians such as Nancy Pelosi. She also hadn't lived in the electorate for a number of years but promised to return there if elected, in 2022 Martin disclosed that she lived in nearby East Ryde.

Tensions arose during the election when volunteers for Martin's campaign were accused of inappropriate slurs at volunteers for her Labor opponent and Martin lodged a complaint after claiming to have been "manhandled" by a Labor volunteer.

Martin retained Reid for the Liberal Party, on a margin of around 53%. She was a member of the Moderate/Modern Liberal faction of the Liberal Party.

In December 2020, Martin was selected to chair a Select Committee into Mental Health and Suicide Prevention. The select committee, made up of 5 Coalition MPs and 3 Labor MPs handed down its final report in November 2021.

Martin was an active member of the Standing Committee on Health, Aged Care and Sport, Joint Standing Committee on National Disability Insurance Scheme, Select Committee on Australia's Family Law System and Standing Committee on Social Policy and Legal Affairs.

On 10 February 2022, Martin crossed the floor with four other Liberal MPs to protect vulnerable young people including transgender students in the government's modifications to the Sex Discrimination Act, which resulted in the Coalition Government's Religious Discrimination Bill being pulled. Martin's vote was the decisive fifth vote needed to guarantee the included amendments would pass. Defending her decision, she said "I did what was right. I supported the religious discrimination bill, I supported people of faith and I protected the rights of vulnerable young students. To me, that was the right balance"

Martin would go on to lose the seat to Labor's Sitou on a swing of around 8%. It was reported that after her loss the outgoing Prime Minister Scott Morrison didn't call Martin to commiserate her defeat. It was reported that eight months before the 2022 election Martin wanted then Treasurer Josh Frydenberg to lead the Liberal Party.

In 2023, she endorsed a yes vote in the 2023 Indigenous Voice to Parliament referendum. In 2024 Martin let her party membership lapse, citing negative experiences within the NSW Liberal Party but she has since rejoined after a break. She was reported in 2025 to be an active member of the Moderate Liberal faction.

== Personal life ==
Fiona Martin was initially married to Jeremy Martin, but they divorced in 2015. Martin later married Nicolai Clausen, who was a Danish citizen at the time of their marriage. Since December 2022, she has been in a relationship with Liberal senator Andrew Bragg. Martin has four children.

Martin was one of eleven MPs in the 46th Parliament of Australia who possessed a PhD, the others being Katie Allen, Jim Chalmers, Anne Aly, Andrew Leigh, Daniel Mulino, Jess Walsh, Adam Bandt, Mehreen Faruqi, Anne Webster and Helen Haines.

== See also ==
- Members of the Australian House of Representatives: 2019–2022
- Electoral results for the Division of Reid 2019

Parliament of Australia
Preceded by Craig Laundy	Member for Reid; 2019–2022	Succeeded by Sally Sitou
