= Snickers (disambiguation) =

Snickers is a brand of peanut, caramel and chocolate-based confectionery bar.

Snickers may also refer to:

- Snickers, a daily light verse feature created by Charles Ghigna and syndicated by Tribune Media Services
- Petrus Matthias Snickers, Dutch clergyman
- Snickers, nickname for the Anticenter shell galaxy
- Snickers, a dachshund character on the TV show Bluey

== See also ==
- Snicker, a form of laughter
