= Katherine Deves =

Australian politician and lawyer

- Born: 1977 or 1978 (age 48–49)
- Occupation: Lawyer
- Known for: Liberal Party candidate for Warringah, views on transgender people
- Political party: One Nation (2026–present)
- Other political affiliations: Liberal (until 2026)
- Children: 3

Katherine Deves Morgan is an Australian lawyer and pro women’s rights activist who ran unsuccessfully as a candidate for the Liberal Party of Australia at the 2022 Australian federal election.

Deves has been described as a "captain's pick" by then-prime minister Scott Morrison, for the formerly blue-ribbon seat of Warringah on Sydney's Northern Beaches. She has been criticised for her views and public statements about po women’s rights, and is an advocate for safe spaces for women and girls.

== Politics ==
Before late 2020, there is minimal information about Deves' activities. Deves has said she became interested in gender identity and women's sport around 2015. In 2020, Deves stated that she had been "active in the debate online for a number of years", but "a few years ago I decided to stop just complaining online and try to figure out how I can make a difference in real life.” In 2020, she co-founded the Save Women's Sport lobby group, intended to exclude transgender women from women's sport, by uniting with a New Zealand lobby group by the same name to create an Australasian organisation. In 2020, she created a Twitter account, and began to appear in the media, including in articles in conservative news outlets such as The Australian, and several appearances on Sky News Australia and podcasts. On September 21, 2021, Deves filed an application to join the Liberal Party, and in December, the application was accepted.

=== 2022 election campaign ===
Before Deves' candidacy, infighting between the Liberal Party's moderate and conservative factions caused them to support disability advocate David Brady and defence analyst Lincoln Parker respective to be preselected for the Division of Warringah. Both men were described by an anonymous senior Warringah Liberal as not "the kind of candidate we really needed here". Warringah had long been considered a safe Liberal seat, until independent candidate Zali Steggall beat former Prime Minister Tony Abbott at the 2019 election. Deves applied for Warringah preselection in February 2022, but had been rejected on the grounds that she had not been a Liberal Party member for long enough. Despite this fact, she had gained traction among members of the centre-right faction as a "circuit breaker" candidate. According to the same Warringah Liberal, Deves appeared to be "smart, articulate, not at all a 'politician', and [looked] like a movie star." By the end of March 2022, a three-person committee was appointed to appoint a candidate for Warringah, among other seats, consisting of former president of the New South Wales Liberals Christine McDiven, Morrison and New South Wales then-premier Dominic Perrottet. On 2 April, the committee announced Deves as the Liberal candidate for Warringah. Due to the "hurried nomination" of Deves, it is unclear whether the committee knew of the extent of Deves' anti-transgender views before her preselection, as she had deleted her Twitter and Facebook accounts before preselection. Although some vetting was conducted, her Twitter history was not raised. In early April 2022, a repository of Deves' deleted tweets was uploaded to GitHub by a German computer programmer.

During the campaign, Deves made comments relating to transgender people, which caused significant controversy. Statements included the false claim that gender reassignment surgery was available to teenagers in Australia, and that anti-transgender activism was equivalent to "standing up against the Holocaust". Deves also stated that transgender children were "surgically mutilated and sterilised", which she initially apologised for, before withdrawing her apology. Deves was invited to the Sydney Jewish Museum, after her comment relating to the Holocaust. After her visit, Deves stated that "under no circumstances must the Holocaust [sic] ever be trivialised.” In a similar incident, Deves compared transgender children being removed from abusive parents to the Stolen Generations. Deves also routinely misgendered transgender athletes, such as Laurel Hubbard and Hannah Mouncey, described Wear it Purple Day as a "grooming tactic used by gender extremists", and described the gay and lesbian movement as being "hijacked by gender activists".

Many Liberals, including then-treasurer of New South Wales Matt Kean and member for the federal seat of North Sydney Trent Zimmerman called for Deves to be disendorsed; however, other anonymous Liberal Party members and Morrison backed her. Kean also stated that he does "not believe she’s fit for office." Former prime minister Malcolm Turnbull strongly condemned Deves' comments and called for her disendorsement, stating that "they are hateful comments that seem to be designed to whip up animosity and hatred against some of the most vulnerable people in our community." Morrison praised Deves as an "outstanding individual" for "standing up for things that she believes in." On 22 April 2022, Deves held a campaign event in a Sydney pub, where media were informed that they were banned from entering. In April 2022, Deves stated that she had reported death threats made against her to the police, but New South Wales Police stated they had not received a report of any threats.

In the leadup to the election, Deves received significant media attention due to her controversial comments. In an eleven day timeframe in the lead up to the election, she received more mentions across news publications than any Liberal frontbencher except for Morrison himself, being mentioned over 1,100 times. She was defeated in the formerly safe Liberal seat of Warringah by incumbent Zali Steggall, who won a second term. Deves lost the two-candidate preferred vote by 39% to Steggall's 60%, with a 6.6% swing against the Liberal Party.

Deves' candidacy was identified by some commentators as one of contributing factors to the Liberal Party's defeat in the election. Carol Johnson writes that Morrison's "captain's pick" was an attempt to appeal to socially-conservative voters, but ended up alienating small-l liberal voters. Liberal Senator Simon Birmingham stated that Deves' candidature had had a "contagion effect on adjacent seats", where her controversy hurt the Liberal vote both in Warringah and for other Liberal candidates elsewhere. Deves criticised Liberal Party members that had objected to her anti-trans comments, including Kean, Birmingham, and Andrew Bragg, claiming their criticism of her hurt her chances of winning Warringah.

After the election, Deves objected to criticism that she was homophobic, stating on Sky News Australia, "Of all of the untruths and distortions attributed to me in my public life there is one lie that hurts more than any other, and that is the completely groundless accusation that I am homophobic."

=== Subsequent activities ===
On 17 April 2023, Deves announced that she would be nominating to fill the Senate vacancy left by Jim Molan. If successful, she stated that she would oppose the Indigenous Voice to Parliament. Deves pulled out of the contest on 23 April, to focus on her legal defence for women-only social media platform Giggle for Girls founded by Sall Grover. In December 2022, Giggle was being sued by a transgender woman, Roxanne Tickle, after she was classified as a man and banned from the app. In June 2023, an application made by Deves to dismiss the case was rejected. In the same month, Deves spoke at an anti-transgender event at Parliament House, Sydney, which included Victorian MLC Moira Deeming, and New South Wales MLCs John Ruddick, Tania Mihailuk, and Greg Donnelly.

In August 2023, Deves confirmed she was considering running for Warringah again at the 2025 Australian federal election. However the preselection ultimately went to Jaimee Rogers.

In August 2024, Tickle v Giggle concluded, with the federal court ruling against Grover, ordering her to pay damages to Roxanne Tickle. The judgment also stated that Grover's legal case, which Deves had contributed to, had been presented in a "disjointed and somewhat incoherent way".

In October 2026, Deves defected to the far-right One Nation party, with the intention of being preselected to run for the Legislative Council in the 2027 New South Wales state election. She was announced as a candidate for the Legislative Council in November 2026.

== Views ==
Deves is most well known for her anti-transgender views. She has described herself as a trans-exclusionary radical feminist (TERF).

Deves is a monarchist. The Australian Monarchist League received controversy when it announced Deves would be speaking at their annual conference. When preselected for Warringah in 2022, she said she would focus on local issues, particularly cost of living and small businesses. Deves opposed "draconian" COVID-19 policies implemented by the New South Wales Liberal Party, and called for the Prime Minister to "sort out the vaccine rollout". Deves is against pornography, calling it "a corrupting influence", and is against pushes to ban gay conversion therapy, critical of a Victorian bill to ban the practice.

== Personal life ==
Deves lives in Manly Vale with her partner and three daughters. Before entering politics, Deves worked in marketing, as an employee for Treasury Wine Estates. She studied law at University of Sydney and qualified as a lawyer in 2021. In July 2022, she was injured after skiing at Thredbo, missing a Liberal party meeting. Deves has contributed to Sky News Australia and The Spectator.

== See also ==
- Moira Deeming – anti-transgender activist and former Victorian Liberal Party member
