= Laugh (disambiguation) =

A laugh is an expression of mirth particular to the human species.

Laugh may also refer to:

- Laugh (band), a precursor of the band Intastella
- Laugh (Keller Williams album), 2002
- Laugh (Terry Hall album), 1997
- Laugh (Lilas Ikuta album), 2025
- "Laugh", a 1967 song off The Monkees album, More of the Monkees
- "Laugh", a 1982 song off the Swans self titled EP
- Laugh Comics, a comic book produced by Archie Comics from 1946 to 1987
- The Laugh, a 1911 painting by Umberto Boccioni

== See also ==
- Last Laugh (disambiguation)
