= Electoral results for the Division of Banks =

Australian division election results

This is a list of electoral results for the Division of Banks in Australian federal elections from the division's creation in 1949 until the present.

== Members ==
Member	Party	Term
Eric Costa	Labor	1949–1969
Vince Martin	Labor	1969–1980
John Mountford	Labor	1980–1990
Daryl Melham	Labor	1990–2013
David Coleman	Liberal	2013–2025
Zhi Soon	Labor	2025–present

== Election results ==
=== Elections in the 2020s ===
==== 2025 ====
2025 Australian federal election: Banks
Party	Candidate	Votes	%	±%
Liberal	David Coleman	38,683	39.10	−5.50
Labor	Zhi Soon	36,039	36.43	+0.59
Greens	Natalie Hanna	11,756	11.88	+3.27
One Nation	Todd Nicol	3,666	3.71	+0.44
Trumpet of Patriots	Allan Taruste	3,430	3.47	+3.47
Libertarian	Marika Momircevski	2,678	2.71	+1.54
Independent	John Coyne	1,995	2.02	+2.02
Democrats	Phillip Pearce	688	0.70	+0.70
Total formal votes		98,935	90.00	−3.16
Informal votes		10,998	10.00	+3.16
Turnout		109,933	92.13	+1.61
Two-party-preferred result
Labor	Zhi Soon	51,830	52.39	+5.03
Liberal	David Coleman	47,105	47.61	−5.03
Labor gain from Liberal		Swing	+5.03	

==== 2022 ====
2022 Australian federal election: Banks
Party	Candidate	Votes	%	±%
Liberal	David Coleman	41,622	45.22	−5.70
Labor	Zhi Soon	32,459	35.26	−1.09
Greens	Natalie Hanna	8,063	8.76	+2.94
United Australia	Marika Momircevski	5,048	5.48	+3.27
One Nation	Malcolm Heffernan	2,628	2.86	+2.86
Liberal Democrats	Elouise Cocker	1,264	1.37	+1.37
	Steve Khouw	961	1.04	+1.04
Total formal votes		92,045	93.36	+0.56
Informal votes		6,550	6.64	−0.56
Turnout		98,595	91.55	−1.48
Two-party-preferred result
Liberal	David Coleman	48,969	53.20	−3.06
Labor	Zhi Soon	43,076	46.80	+3.06
Liberal hold		Swing	−3.06	

Alluvial diagram for preference flows in the seat of Banks in the 2022 federal election. indicates at what stage the winning candidate had over 50% of the votes and was declared the winner.

=== Elections in the 2010s ===
==== 2019 ====
2019 Australian federal election: Banks
Party	Candidate	Votes	%	±%
Liberal	David Coleman	46,709	50.92	+7.03
Labor	Chris Gambian	33,341	36.35	−3.60
Greens	Gianluca Dragone	5,339	5.82	+0.00
Christian Democrats	Ki Man Ho	2,624	2.86	−2.46
United Australia	Reginald Wright	2,029	2.21	+2.21
Animal Justice	Anjali Thakur	1,688	1.84	+0.11
Total formal votes		91,730	92.80	−0.30
Informal votes		7,115	7.20	+0.30
Turnout		98,845	93.03	+1.04
Two-party-preferred result
Liberal	David Coleman	51,609	56.26	+4.82
Labor	Chris Gambian	40,121	43.74	−4.82
Liberal hold		Swing	+4.82	

==== 2016 ====
2016 Australian federal election: Banks
Party	Candidate	Votes	%	±%
Liberal	David Coleman	39,423	43.89	−3.83
Labor	Chris Gambian	35,890	39.95	+0.08
Greens	Philippa Clark	5,225	5.82	+0.77
Christian Democrats	Greg Bondar	4,777	5.32	+2.91
Family First	Sharon Wu	1,621	1.80	+1.80
Animal Justice	Roy Barnes	1,555	1.73	+1.73
Independent	Bob Spanswick	1,341	1.49	+1.49
Total formal votes		89,832	93.10	+2.19
Informal votes		6,656	6.90	−2.19
Turnout		96,488	91.99	−3.74
Two-party-preferred result
Liberal	David Coleman	46,210	51.44	−1.36
Labor	Chris Gambian	43,622	48.56	+1.36
Liberal hold		Swing	−1.36	

==== 2013 ====
2013 Australian federal election: Banks
Party	Candidate	Votes	%	±%
Liberal	David Coleman	39,899	47.01	+1.49
Labor	Daryl Melham	34,835	41.04	−1.92
Greens	Paul Spight	4,242	5.00	−4.61
Palmer United	Jake Wellham	2,125	2.50	+2.50
Christian Democrats	Mark Falanga	1,983	2.34	+2.34
Independent	Sayed Khedr	768	0.90	+0.90
Katter's Australian	Ross Richardson	553	0.65	+0.65
Democratic Labour	Robert Haddad	470	0.55	+0.55
Total formal votes		84,875	90.05	−1.58
Informal votes		9,374	9.95	+1.58
Turnout		94,249	92.86	+0.16
Two-party-preferred result
Liberal	David Coleman	43,990	51.83	+3.28
Labor	Daryl Melham	40,885	48.17	−3.28
Liberal gain from Labor		Swing	+3.28	

==== 2010 ====
2010 Australian federal election: Banks
Party	Candidate	Votes	%	±%
Liberal	Ron Delezio	38,178	45.52	+10.48
Labor	Daryl Melham	36,034	42.96	−10.76
Greens	Paul Spight	8,062	9.61	+3.21
One Nation	Michael Parsons	1,595	1.90	+1.90
Total formal votes		83,869	91.63	−2.61
Informal votes		7,665	8.37	+2.61
Turnout		91,534	92.68	−1.80
Two-party-preferred result
Labor	Daryl Melham	43,150	51.45	−8.92
Liberal	Ron Delezio	40,719	48.55	+8.92
Labor hold		Swing	−8.92	

=== Elections in the 2000s ===
==== 2007 ====
2007 Australian federal election: Banks
Party	Candidate	Votes	%	±%
Labor	Daryl Melham	45,059	54.62	+8.37
Liberal	Bruce Morrow	27,728	33.61	−6.60
Greens	Susan Roberts	4,612	5.59	+0.91
Christian Democrats	Stephen Chavura	3,180	3.85	+0.27
Citizens Electoral Council	Huu Khoa Nguyen	1,430	1.73	+1.68
Liberty & Democracy	Don Nguyen	492	0.60	+0.60
Total formal votes		82,501	93.64	+1.57
Informal votes		5,608	6.36	−1.57
Turnout		88,109	95.02	−0.29
Two-party-preferred result
Labor	Daryl Melham	50,392	61.08	+7.86
Liberal	Bruce Morrow	32,109	38.92	−7.86
Labor hold		Swing	+7.86	

==== 2004 ====
2004 Australian federal election: Banks
Party	Candidate	Votes	%	±%
Labor	Daryl Melham	32,736	44.61	+0.36
Liberal	Roger Gray	30,927	42.15	+6.36
Greens	Stephen Makin	3,433	4.68	+1.87
Christian Democrats	Janne Peterson	2,654	3.62	+0.95
One Nation	Harry Stavrinos	2,302	3.14	−3.17
Democrats	Mark Clyburn	675	0.92	−2.27
Family First	Greg Briscoe-Hough	655	0.89	+0.89
Total formal votes		73,382	92.65	−0.52
Informal votes		5,818	7.35	+0.52
Turnout		79,200	95.09	−0.01
Two-party-preferred result
Labor	Daryl Melham	37,468	51.06	−1.83
Liberal	Roger Gray	35,914	48.94	+1.83
Labor hold		Swing	−1.83	

==== 2001 ====
2001 Australian federal election: Banks
Party	Candidate	Votes	%	±%
Labor	Daryl Melham	32,592	44.25	−0.34
Liberal	Marcus Watzlaff	26,358	35.79	+1.79
One Nation	Lynn Abrahams	4,649	6.31	−4.46
AAFI	Ken O'Leary	2,522	3.42	+3.42
Democrats	Stephen Cole	2,350	3.19	−1.06
Greens	David Wilcox	2,066	2.81	+1.32
Christian Democrats	Sam Baissari	1,968	2.67	+0.72
Unity	Lynne Murphy	731	0.99	−2.15
Independent	Nazim Hannoun	418	0.57	+0.57
Total formal votes		73,654	93.18	−2.89
Informal votes		5,393	6.82	+2.89
Turnout		79,047	95.48	
Two-party-preferred result
Labor	Daryl Melham	38,952	52.88	−4.37
Liberal	Marcus Watzlaff	34,702	47.12	+4.37
Labor hold		Swing	−4.37	

=== Elections in the 1990s ===
==== 1998 ====
1998 Australian federal election: Banks
Party	Candidate	Votes	%	±%
Labor	Daryl Melham	32,599	44.52	+0.96
Liberal	Stephen Iacono	24,744	33.79	−5.70
One Nation	Phillip Maddison	8,010	10.94	+10.94
Democrats	Alison Bailey	3,128	4.27	−3.33
Unity	Bill Chen	2,250	3.07	+3.07
Christian Democrats	Brian Grigg	1,422	1.94	+1.94
Greens	Greg Archer	1,075	1.47	+1.47
Total formal votes		73,228	96.06	+0.30
Informal votes		3,006	3.94	−0.30
Turnout		76,234	95.16	−1.68
Two-party-preferred result
Labor	Daryl Melham	41,818	57.11	+5.70
Liberal	Stephen Iacono	31,410	42.89	−5.70
Labor hold		Swing	+5.70	

==== 1996 ====
1996 Australian federal election: Banks
Party	Candidate	Votes	%	±%
Labor	Daryl Melham	31,878	43.56	−11.25
Liberal	David Sparkes	28,903	39.49	+4.77
Democrats	Alison Bailey	5,566	7.60	+4.03
AAFI	Gregg West	3,797	5.19	+5.19
Independent	Don Thompson	2,076	2.84	+2.84
Independent	John Kayes	970	1.33	+1.33
Total formal votes		73,190	95.75	−0.85
Informal votes		3,246	4.25	+0.85
Turnout		76.436	96.85	+0.40
Two-party-preferred result
Labor	Daryl Melham	37,442	51.41	−9.13
Liberal	David Sparkes	35,391	48.59	+9.13
Labor hold		Swing	−9.13	

==== 1993 ====
1993 Australian federal election: Banks
Party	Candidate	Votes	%	±%
Labor	Daryl Melham	40,460	54.80	+6.45
Liberal	Clive Taylor	25,634	34.72	−0.61
Democrats	Peter Farleigh	2,642	3.58	−7.96
Independent	Deborah Kirkman	2,522	3.42	+3.42
Call to Australia	Paul Davaris	1,726	2.34	+0.23
Independent	John Hay	846	1.15	+0.24
Total formal votes		73,830	96.61	+0.16
Informal votes		2,593	3.39	−0.16
Turnout		76.423	96.44	
Two-party-preferred result
Labor	Daryl Melham	44,675	60.54	+2.91
Liberal	Clive Taylor	29,117	39.46	−2.91
Labor hold		Swing	+2.91	

==== 1990 ====
1990 Australian federal election: Banks
Party	Candidate	Votes	%	±%
Labor	Daryl Melham	30,484	48.6	−4.2
Liberal	Steve Pratt	21,957	35.0	−4.4
Democrats	Paul Terrett	7,400	11.8	+4.0
Call to Australia	Ian Clipsham	1,415	2.3	+2.3
Independent	John Hay	671	1.1	+1.1
Independent	Brian Meyer	483	0.8	+0.8
Democratic Socialist	Graeme Robinson	354	0.6	+0.6
Total formal votes		62,764	96.4	+1.0
Informal votes		2,367	3.6	−1.0
Turnout		65,131	96.2	−0.3
Two-party-preferred result
Labor	Daryl Melham	36,233	57.9	+1.1
Liberal	Steve Pratt	26,379	42.1	−1.1
Labor hold		Swing	+1.1	

=== Elections in the 1980s ===
==== 1987 ====
1987 Australian federal election: Banks
Party	Candidate	Votes	%	±%
Labor	John Mountford	32,687	52.8	−4.6
Liberal	Max Parker	24,430	39.4	+4.3
Democrats	Montague Green	4,819	7.8	+0.4
Total formal votes		61,936	95.4	+1.7
Informal votes		3,017	4.6	−1.7
Turnout		64,953	96.5	+1.1
Two-party-preferred result
Labor	John Mountford	35,180	56.8	−4.6
Liberal	Max Parker	26,745	43.2	+4.6
Labor hold		Swing	−4.6	

==== 1984 ====
1984 Australian federal election: Banks
Party	Candidate	Votes	%	±%
Labor	John Mountford	35,473	57.4	+0.5
Liberal	Max Parker	21,705	35.1	−1.3
Democrats	Montague Green	4,590	7.4	+1.6
Total formal votes		61,768	93.7	−3.9
Informal votes		4,127	6.3	+3.9
Turnout		65,895	95.4	−0.3
Two-party-preferred result
Labor	John Mountford	37,908	61.4	+0.3
Liberal	Max Parker	23,858	38.6	−0.3
Labor hold		Swing	+0.3	

==== 1983 ====
1983 Australian federal election: Banks
Party	Candidate	Votes	%	±%
Labor	John Mountford	39,013	57.8	+4.2
Liberal	Andrew Fairbairn	23,962	35.5	−1.3
Democrats	Montague Greene	3,908	5.8	−3.8
Socialist Workers	David Holmes	572	0.8	+0.8
Total formal votes		67,455	97.6	+0.1
Informal votes		1,639	2.4	−0.1
Turnout		69,094	95.7	−0.2
Two-party-preferred result
Labor	John Mountford	41,226	61.12	+2.32
Liberal	Andrew Fairbairn	26,229	38.88	−2.32
Labor hold		Swing	+2.32	

==== 1980 ====
1980 Australian federal election: Banks
Party	Candidate	Votes	%	±%
Labor	John Mountford	36,842	53.6	+5.0
Liberal	Donald McConnell	25,316	36.8	−0.9
Democrats	Montague Greene	6,600	9.6	−4.1
Total formal votes		68,758	97.5	−0.1
Informal votes		1,741	2.5	+0.1
Turnout		70,499	95.9	−0.5
Two-party-preferred result
Labor	John Mountford		58.8	+4.6
Liberal	Donald McConnell		41.2	−4.6
Labor hold		Swing	+4.6	

=== Elections in the 1970s ===
==== 1977 ====
1977 Australian federal election: Banks
Party	Candidate	Votes	%	±%
Labor	Vince Martin	33,452	48.6	−4.8
Liberal	Paul Hinton	25,942	37.7	−4.5
Democrats	Montague Greene	9,453	13.7	+13.7
Total formal votes		68,847	97.6	−0.3
Informal votes		1,693	2.4	+0.3
Turnout		70,540	96.4	−0.3
Two-party-preferred result
Labor	Vince Martin	37,330	54.2	−0.6
Liberal	Paul Hinton	31,517	45.8	+0.6
Labor hold		Swing	−0.6	

==== 1975 ====
1975 Australian federal election: Banks
Party	Candidate	Votes	%	±%
Labor	Vince Martin	30,617	51.7	−9.2
Liberal	Maxwell Gibson	26,035	43.9	+10.2
Independent	Denise Arrow	1,939	3.3	+3.3
Workers	Ralph Skelton	681	1.1	+1.1
Total formal votes		59,272	97.9	−0.5
Informal votes		1,249	2.1	+0.5
Turnout		60,521	96.7	+0.3
Two-party-preferred result
Labor	Vince Martin		53.1	−10.4
Liberal	Maxwell Gibson		46.9	+10.4
Labor hold		Swing	−10.4	

==== 1974 ====
1974 Australian federal election: Banks
Party	Candidate	Votes	%	±%
Labor	Vince Martin	35,850	60.9	+2.2
Liberal	Peter Kintominas	19,828	33.7	+0.7
Australia	Garry Bennett	3,203	5.4	+1.0
Total formal votes		58,881	98.4	−0.2
Informal votes		945	1.6	+0.2
Turnout		59,826	96.4	−0.2
Two-party-preferred result
Labor	Vince Martin		63.5	+1.6
Liberal	Peter Kintominas		36.5	−1.6
Labor hold		Swing	+1.6	

==== 1972 ====
1972 Australian federal election: Banks
Party	Candidate	Votes	%	±%
Labor	Vince Martin	31,620	58.7	+7.5
Liberal	Randall Green	17,757	33.0	+2.6
Australia	Charles Nasmyth	2,392	4.4	+4.4
Democratic Labor	John Anderson	2,114	3.9	+1.8
Total formal votes		53,882	98.6	+0.9
Informal votes		738	1.4	−0.9
Turnout		54,620	96.6	−0.1
Two-party-preferred result
Labor	Vince Martin		61.9	−0.1
Liberal	Randall Green		38.1	+0.1
Labor hold		Swing	−0.1	

=== Elections in the 1960s ===
==== 1969 ====
1969 Australian federal election: Banks
Party	Candidate	Votes	%	±%
Labor	Vince Martin	25,485	51.2	+6.3
Liberal	Herman Tibben	15,102	30.4	−17.4
Independent	Peter Allen	5,949	12.0	+12.0
Independent	Reginald Jones	1,805	3.6	+3.6
Democratic Labor	Annette Andrew	1,030	2.1	−2.6
Independent	Kevin Watt	363	0.7	+0.7
Total formal votes		49,734	97.7	+2.0
Informal votes		1,166	2.3	−2.0
Turnout		50,900	96.7	−0.8
Two-party-preferred result
Labor	Vince Martin		62.0	+11.8
Liberal	Herman Tibben		38.0	−11.8
Labor hold		Swing	+11.8	

==== 1966 ====
1966 Australian federal election: Banks
Party	Candidate	Votes	%	±%
Labor	Eric Costa	28,748	47.5	−8.7
Liberal	Herman Tibben	27,349	45.2	+6.2
Democratic Labor	Norma Boyle	2,866	4.7	−8.7
Communist	Harry Hatfield	1,563	2.6	−2.3
Total formal votes		60,526	95.7	
Informal votes		2,697	4.3	
Turnout		63,223	95.9	
Two-party-preferred result
Labor	Eric Costa	31,974	52.8	−7.9
Liberal	Herman Tibben	28,552	47.2	+7.9
Labor hold		Swing	−7.9	

==== 1963 ====
1963 Australian federal election: Banks
Party	Candidate	Votes	%	±%
Labor	Eric Costa	33,175	56.2	−1.9
Liberal	Milovan Kovjanic	23,014	39.0	+12.9
Communist	Pat Clancy	2,885	4.9	+3.2
Total formal votes		59,074	98.3	
Informal votes		1,009	1.7	
Turnout		60,083	96.4	
Two-party-preferred result
Labor	Eric Costa		60.7	−5.3
Liberal	Milovan Kovjanic		39.3	+5.3
Labor hold		Swing	−5.3	

==== 1961 ====
1961 Australian federal election: Banks
Party	Candidate	Votes	%	±%
Labor	Eric Costa	31,755	58.1	−0.1
Liberal	Jack Manning	14,244	26.1	−7.4
Independent	Russell Duncan	5,190	9.5	+9.5
Democratic Labor	John Antill	2,476	4.5	−0.5
Communist	Frank Bollins	945	1.7	−1.7
Total formal votes		54,610	96.6	
Informal votes		1,896	3.4	
Turnout		56,506	96.1	
Two-party-preferred result
Labor	Eric Costa		66.0	+3.7
Liberal	Jack Manning		34.0	−3.7
Labor hold		Swing	+3.7	

=== Elections in the 1950s ===
==== 1958 ====
1958 Australian federal election: Banks
Party	Candidate	Votes	%	±%
Labor	Eric Costa	28,338	58.2	+2.2
Liberal	Edgar Booth	16,322	33.5	−2.5
Democratic Labor	John Lloyd	2,407	4.9	+4.9
Communist	Pat Clancy	1,634	3.4	−4.6
Total formal votes		48,701	96.4	
Informal votes		1,805	3.6	
Turnout		50,506	96.1	
Two-party-preferred result
Labor	Eric Costa		63.4	−1.2
Liberal	Edgar Booth		36.6	+1.2
Labor hold		Swing	−1.2	

==== 1955 ====
1955 Australian federal election: Banks
Party	Candidate	Votes	%	±%
Labor	Eric Costa	23,431	56.0	−4.1
Liberal	Harold Stalker	15,088	36.0	+2.1
Communist	Pat Clancy	3,356	8.0	+2.5
Total formal votes		41,875	96.8	
Informal votes		1,386	3.2	
Turnout		43,261	96.4	
Two-party-preferred result
Labor	Eric Costa		63.5	−1.8
Liberal	Harold Stalker		36.5	+1.8
Labor hold		Swing	−7.9	

==== 1954 ====
1954 Australian federal election: Banks
Party	Candidate	Votes	%	±%
Labor	Eric Costa	34,241	61.4	−0.3
Liberal	Harold Stalker	18,589	33.4	−4.9
Communist	Pat Clancy	2,908	5.2	+5.2
Total formal votes		55,738	98.6	
Informal votes		816	1.4	
Turnout		56,554	96.2	
Two-party-preferred result
Labor	Eric Costa		66.1	+4.4
Liberal	Harold Stalker		33.9	−4.4
Labor hold		Swing	+4.4	

==== 1951 ====
1951 Australian federal election: Banks
Party	Candidate	Votes	%	±%
Labor	Eric Costa	28,219	61.7	+3.4
Liberal	George Roffey	17,536	38.3	+1.8
Total formal votes		45,755	97.6	
Informal votes		1,143	2.4	
Turnout		46,898	95.8	
Labor hold		Swing	−0.5	

=== Elections in the 1940s ===
==== 1949 ====
1949 Australian federal election: Banks
Party	Candidate	Votes	%	±%
Labor	Eric Costa	24,537	58.3	−3.8
Liberal	Howard Fletcher	15,371	36.5	+7.6
Lang Labor	Francis Foy	2,202	5.2	+5.2
Total formal votes		42,110	98.8	
Informal votes		941	2.2	
Turnout		43,051	95.5	
Two-party-preferred result
Labor	Eric Costa		62.2	−4.1
Liberal	Howard Fletcher		37.8	+4.1
Labor notional hold		Swing	−4.1	
