= Greek verbs =

Greek conjugation may refer to:

- Modern Greek verbs
- Ancient Greek verbs
