= Greek declension =

Greek declension may refer to:

- Declensions in Ancient Greek grammar
- Declensions in Modern Greek grammar
