= Monty Green =

Monty Green may refer to:

== People ==
- Monty Green, political candidate, see Electoral results for the Division of Banks
- Monty Green, Israeli general and commander of Technological and Logistics Directorate

== Fictional characters ==
- Monty Green, character in The 100 (TV series)
