= Modern Greek =

Dialects and varieties of the Greek language spoken in the modern era

- Νέα Ελληνικά
- Pronunciation: [ˈne.a eliniˈka]
- Native to: Greece; Cyprus; Albania (Southern Albania); Turkey (Anatolia); Italy (Calabria, Salento)
- Region: Eastern Mediterranean
- Ethnicity: Greeks
- Native speakers: 13.4 million (2012)
- Language family: Indo-European: Hellenic; Greek; (disputed); Attic–Ionic; Attic; Koine; Modern Greek
- Early forms: Proto-Greek: Ancient Greek; Koine Greek; Medieval Greek
- Standard forms: Standard Modern Greek
- Dialects: Italiot • Calabrian Greek • Griko; Pontic • Mariupolitan?; Cappadocian; Tsakonian; Yevanic; Maniot; Himariote; Cypriot; Cretan; Demotic (base for the St. Mod. Greek); Katharevousa (artificial, base for the St. Mod. Greek); Australian; other
- Writing system: Greek alphabet Greek Braille

Official status
- Official language in: Greece; Cyprus; European Union
- Recognised minority language in: Albania; Armenia; Hungary; Italy; Romania; South Africa (Note: (protected language)); Turkey; Ukraine
- Regulated by: Center for the Greek Language

Language codes
- ISO 639-1: el
- ISO 639-2: gre (B) ell (T)
- ISO 639-3: ell
- Glottolog: mode1248
- Linguasphere: part of 56-AAA-a

Modern Greek (endonym: Νέα Ελληνικά, Néa Elliniká [ˈne.a eliniˈka] or Κοινή Νεοελληνική Γλώσσα, Kiní Neoellinikí Glóssa), generally referred to by speakers simply as Greek (Ελληνικά, Elliniká), refers collectively to the dialects of the Greek language spoken in the modern era, including the official standardized form of the language sometimes referred to as Standard Modern Greek. The end of the Medieval Greek period and the beginning of Modern Greek is often symbolically assigned to the fall of the Byzantine Empire in 1453, even though that date marks no clear linguistic boundary and many characteristic features of the modern language arose centuries earlier, having begun around the fourth century AD.

During most of the Modern Greek period, the language existed in a situation of diglossia, with regional spoken dialects existing side by side with learned, more archaic written forms, as with the vernacular and learned varieties (Dimotiki and Katharevousa) that co-existed in Greece throughout much of the 19th and 20th centuries.

== Varieties ==
Varieties of Modern Greek include Demotic, Katharevousa, Pontic, Cappadocian, Mariupolitan, Grico, Calabrian, Yevanic, Tsakonian and Greco-Australian.

=== Demotic ===
Strictly speaking, Demotic or Dimotiki (Δημοτική), refers to all popular varieties of Modern Greek that followed a common evolutionary path from Koine and have retained a high degree of mutual intelligibility to the present. As shown in Ptochoprodromic and Acritic poems, Demotic Greek was the vernacular already before the 11th century and called the "Roman" language of the Byzantine Greeks, notably in peninsular Greece, the Greek islands, coastal Asia Minor, Constantinople, and Cyprus.

The distribution of major modern Greek dialect areas.

Today, a standardized variety of Demotic Greek is the official language of Greece and Cyprus, and is referred to as "Standard Modern Greek", or less strictly simply as "Greek", "Modern Greek", or "Demotic".

Demotic Greek comprises various regional varieties with minor linguistic differences, mainly in phonology and vocabulary. Due to the high degree of mutual intelligibility of these varieties, Greek linguists refer to them as "idioms" of a wider "Demotic dialect", known as "Koine Modern Greek" (Koiní Neoellinikí - 'common Neo-Hellenic'). Most English-speaking linguists however refer to them as "dialects", emphasizing degrees of variation only when necessary. Demotic Greek varieties are divided into two main groups, Northern and Southern.

The main distinguishing feature common to Northern variants is a set of standard phonological shifts in unaccented vowel phonemes: [o] becomes [u], [e] becomes [i], and [i] and [u] are dropped. The dropped vowels' existence is implicit, and may affect surrounding phonemes: for example, a dropped [i] palatalizes preceding consonants, just like an [i] that is pronounced. Southern variants do not exhibit these phonological shifts.

Examples of Northern dialects are Rumelian (Constantinople), Epirote, Macedonian, Thessalian, Thracian, Northern Euboean, Sporades, Samos, Smyrna, and Sarakatsanika. The Southern category is divided into groups that include:

1. Old Athenian-Maniot: Megara, Aegina, Athens, Cyme (Old Athenian) and Mani Peninsula (Maniot)
2. Ionian-Peloponnesian: Peloponnese (except Mani), Ionian Islands, Attica, Boeotia, and Southern Euboea
3. Cretan-Cycladian: Cyclades, Crete, and several enclaves in Syria and Lebanon
4. Southeastern: Chios, Ikaria, Dodecanese, and Cyprus.

Demotic Greek has officially been taught in monotonic Greek script since 1982.

=== Katharevousa ===
Katharevousa (Καθαρεύουσα) is a sociolect promoted in the 19th century at the foundation of the modern Greek state, as a compromise between Classical Greek and modern Demotic. It was the official language of modern Greece until 1976.

Katharevousa is written in polytonic Greek script. Also, while Demotic Greek contains loanwords from Turkish, Italian, Latin, and other languages, these have for the most part been purged from Katharevousa. See also the Greek language question.

=== Pontic ===
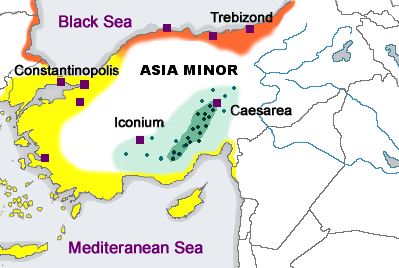
Anatolian Greek dialects until 1923. Demotic in yellow. Pontic in orange. Cappadocian Greek in green, with green dots indicating individual Cappadocian Greek villages in 1910.

Pontic (Ποντιακά) was originally spoken along the mountainous Black Sea coast of Turkey, the so-called Pontus region, until most of its speakers were killed or displaced to modern Greece during the Pontic genocide (1919–1921), followed later by the population exchange between Greece and Turkey in 1923. (Small numbers of Muslim speakers of Pontic Greek escaped these events and still reside in the Pontic villages of Turkey.) It derives from Hellenistic and Medieval Koine and preserves characteristics of Ionic due to ancient colonizations of the region. Pontic evolved as a separate dialect from Demotic Greek as a result of the region's isolation from the Greek mainstream after the Fourth Crusade fragmented the Byzantine Empire into separate kingdoms (see Empire of Trebizond).

=== Cappadocian ===
Cappadocian (Καππαδοκικά) is a Greek dialect of central Turkey of the same fate as Pontic; its speakers settled in mainland Greece after the Greek genocide (1919–1921) and the later population exchange between Greece and Turkey in 1923. Cappadocian Greek diverged from the other Byzantine Greek dialects earlier, beginning with the Turkish conquests of central Asia Minor in the 11th and 12th centuries, and so developed several radical features, such as the loss of the gender for nouns. Having been isolated from the crusader conquests (Fourth Crusade) and the later Venetian influence of the Greek coast, it retained the Ancient Greek terms for many words that were replaced with Romance ones in Demotic Greek. The poet Rumi, whose name means "Roman", referring to his residence amongst the "Roman" Greek speakers of Cappadocia, wrote a few poems in Cappadocian Greek, one of the earliest attestations of the dialect.

=== Mariupolitan ===
Ruméika (Ρωμαίικα) or Mariupolitan Greek is a dialect spoken in about 17 villages around the northern coast of the Sea of Azov in southern Ukraine and Russia. Mariupolitan Greek is closely related to Pontic Greek and evolved from the dialect of Greek spoken in Crimea, which was a part of the Byzantine Empire and then the Pontic Empire of Trebizond, until that latter state fell to the Ottomans in 1461. Thereafter, the Crimean Greek state continued to exist as the independent Greek Principality of Theodoro. The Greek-speaking inhabitants of Crimea were deported by Catherine the Great to resettle in the new city of Mariupol after the Russo-Turkish War (1768–74) to escape the then Muslim-dominated Crimea. Mariupolitan's main features have certain similarities with both Pontic (e.g. the lack of synizesis of -ía, éa) and the northern varieties of the core dialects (e.g. the northern vocalism).

=== Southern Italian ===
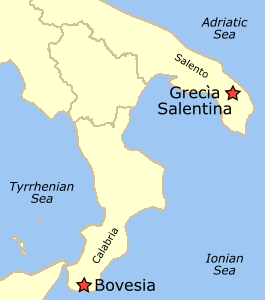
Areas in Southern Italy where the Griko and Calabrian dialects are spoken

Southern Italian or Italiot (Κατωιταλιώτικα) comprises both Calabrian and Griko varieties, spoken by around 15 villages in the regions of Calabria and Apulia. The Southern Italian dialect is the last living trace of Hellenic elements in Southern Italy that once formed Magna Graecia. Its origins can be traced to the Dorian Greek settlers who colonised the area from Sparta and Corinth in 700 BC.

It has received significant Koine Greek influence through Byzantine Greek colonisers who re-introduced Greek language to the region, starting with Justinian's conquest of Italy in late antiquity and continuing through the Middle Ages. Griko and Demotic are mutually intelligible to some extent, but the former shares some common characteristics with Tsakonian.

=== Yevanic ===
Yevanic (יעואניקה, Γεβανικά) is an almost extinct language of Romaniote Jews. The language was already in decline for centuries until most of its speakers were killed in the Holocaust. Afterward, the language was mostly kept by remaining Romaniote emigrants to Israel, where it was displaced by modern Hebrew.

=== Tsakonian ===
Tsakonian (Τσακωνικά) is spoken in its full form today only in a small number of villages around the town of Leonidio in the region of Arcadia in the Southern Peloponnese, and partially spoken further afield in the area. Tsakonian evolved directly from Laconian (ancient Spartan) and therefore descends from Doric Greek.

It has limited input from Hellenistic Koine and is significantly different from and not mutually intelligible with other Greek varieties (such as Demotic Greek and Pontic Greek). Some linguists consider it a separate language because of this.

=== Greco-Australian ===
Greco-Australian is an Australian dialect of Greek that is spoken by the Greek diaspora of Australia, including Greek immigrants living in Australia and Australians of Greek descent.

== Phonology and orthography ==
Spoken Modern Greek

A series of radical sound changes starting in Koine Greek has led to a phonological system in Modern Greek that is significantly different from that of Ancient Greek. Instead of the complex vowel system of Ancient Greek, with its four vowel-height levels, length distinction, and multiple diphthongs, Modern Greek has a simple system of five vowels. This came about through a series of mergers, especially towards /i/ (iotacism).

Modern Greek consonants are plain (voiceless unaspirated) stops, voiced stops, or voiced and unvoiced fricatives. Modern Greek has not preserved length in vowels or consonants.

Modern Greek is written in the Greek alphabet, which has 24 letters, each with a capital and lowercase (small) form. The letter sigma additionally has a special final form. There are two diacritical symbols, the acute accent which indicates stress and the diaeresis marking a vowel letter as not being part of a digraph. Greek has a mixed historical and phonemic orthography, where historical spellings are used if their pronunciation matches modern usage. The correspondence between consonant phonemes and graphemes is largely unique, but several of the vowels can be spelt in multiple ways. Thus reading is easy but spelling is difficult.

A number of diacritical signs were used until 1982, when they were officially dropped from Greek spelling as no longer corresponding to the modern pronunciation of the language. Monotonic orthography is today used in official usage, in schools and for most purposes of everyday writing in Greece. Polytonic orthography, besides being used for older varieties of Greek, is still used in book printing, especially for academic and belletristic purposes, and in everyday use by some conservative writers and elderly people. The Greek Orthodox Church continues to use polytonic and the late Christodoulos of Athens and the Holy Synod of the Church of Greece have requested the reintroduction of polytonic as the official script.

The Greek vowel letters and digraphs with their pronunciations are: ⟨α⟩ /a/, ⟨ε, αι⟩ /e/, ⟨η, ι, υ, ει, οι, υι⟩ /i/, ⟨ο, ω⟩ /o/, and ⟨ου⟩ /u/. The digraphs ⟨αυ⟩, ⟨ευ⟩ and ⟨ηυ⟩ are pronounced /av/, /ev/, and /iv/ respectively before vowels and voiced consonants, and /af/, /ef/ and /if/ respectively before voiceless consonants.

The Greek letters ⟨φ⟩, ⟨β⟩, ⟨θ⟩, and ⟨δ⟩ are pronounced /f/, /v/, /θ/, and /ð/ respectively. The letters ⟨γ⟩ and ⟨χ⟩ are pronounced /ɣ/ and /x/, respectively. All those letters represent fricatives in Modern Greek, but they were used for occlusives with the same (or with a similar) articulation point in Ancient Greek. Before mid or close front vowels (/e/ and /i/), ⟨γ⟩ and ⟨χ⟩ are fronted, becoming [ʝ] and [ç], respectively, which, in some dialects, notably those of Crete and Mani, are further fronted to [ʑ] or [ʒ] and [ɕ] or [ʃ], respectively. Μoreover, before mid or close back vowels (/o/ and /u/), ⟨γ⟩ tends to be pronounced further back than a prototypical velar, between a velar [ɣ] and an uvular [ʁ] (transcribed ɣ̄). The letter ⟨ξ⟩ stands for the sequence /ks/ and ⟨ψ⟩ for /ps/.

The digraphs ⟨γγ⟩ and ⟨γκ⟩ are generally pronounced [ɡ], but are fronted to [ɟ] before front vowels (/e/ and /i/) and tend to be pronounced [ɡ̄] before the back vowels (/o/ and /u/). When these digraphs are preceded by a vowel, they are pronounced [ŋɡ] and [ɲɟ] before front vowels (/e/ and /i/) and [ŋ̄ɡ̄] before the back (/o/ and /u/). The digraph ⟨γγ⟩ may be pronounced [ŋɣ] in some words ([ɲʝ] before front vowels and [ŋ̄ɣ̄] before back ones). The pronunciation [ŋk] for the digraph ⟨γκ⟩ is extremely rare, but could be heard in literary and scholarly words or when reading ancient texts (by a few readers); normally it retains its "original" pronunciation [ŋk] only in the trigraph ⟨γκτ⟩, where ⟨τ⟩ prevents the sonorization of ⟨κ⟩ by ⟨γ⟩ (hence [ŋkt]).

== Syntax and morphology ==
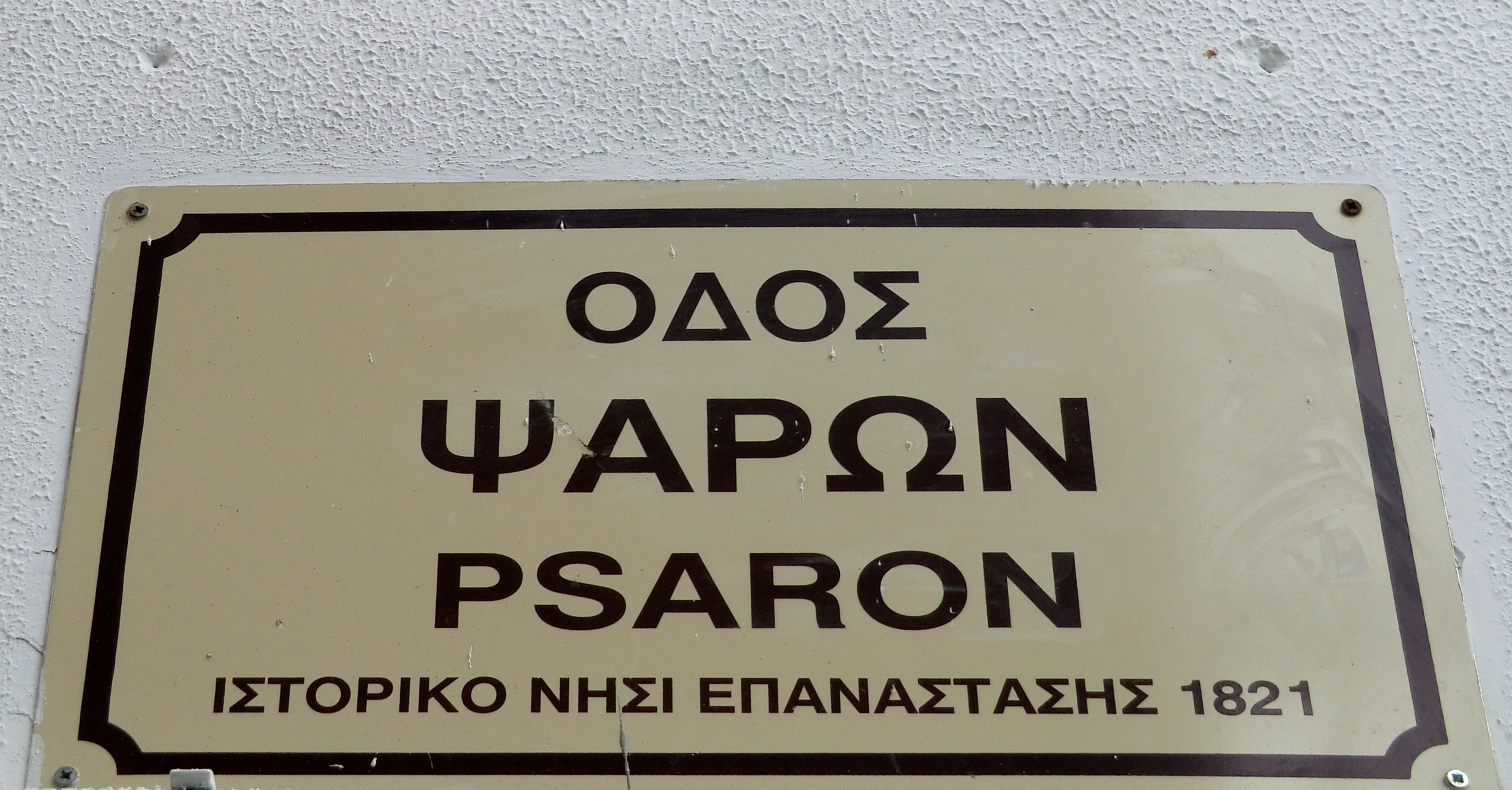
Street sign in Rethymno in honor of Psara island: Psaron (in genitive) Street, historic island of the 1821 Revolution

Modern Greek is largely a synthetic language. Modern Greek and Albanian are the only two modern Indo-European languages that retain a synthetic passive (the North Germanic passive is a recent innovation based on a grammaticalized reflexive pronoun).

=== Differences from Classical Greek ===
Modern Greek has changed from Classical Greek in morphology and syntax, losing some features and gaining others.

Features lost:

- dative case
- optative mood
- infinitive
- dual number
- participles (except the perfect middle-passive participle)
- third person imperative
- reduplicative perfect

Features gained:

- gerund
- modal particle θα (a contraction of ἐθέλω ἵνα → θέλω να → θε' να → θα), which marks future tense and conditional mood
- auxiliary verb forms for certain verb forms (in particular the perfect tense)
- aspectual distinction in future tense between imperfective (present) and perfective (aorist)

Modern Greek has developed a simpler system of grammatical prefixes marking tense and aspect of a verb, such as augmentation and reduplication, and has lost some patterns of noun declension and some distinct forms in the declensions.

Most of these features are shared with other languages spoken in the Balkan peninsula (see Balkan sprachbund), although Greek does not show all typical Balkan areal features, such as the postposed article.

Because of the influence of Katharevousa, however, Demotic is not commonly used in its purest form. Archaisms are still widely used, especially in writing and in more formal speech, as well as in some everyday expressions, such as the dative εντάξει ('okay', literally 'in order') or the third person imperative ζήτω! ('long live!').

== Sample text ==
The following is a sample text in Modern Greek of Article 1 of the Universal Declaration of Human Rights (by the United Nations):

{Άρθρο 1:} Όλοι οι άνθρωποι γεννιούνται ελεύθεροι και ίσοι στην αξιοπρέπεια και τα δικαιώματα. Είναι προικισμένοι με λογική και συνείδηση, και οφείλουν να συμπεριφέρονται μεταξύ τους με πνεύμα αδελφοσύνης.
{Arthro 1:} Oloi oi anthropoi genniountai eleutheroi kai isoi stin axioprepeia kai ta dikaiomata. Einai proikismenoi me logiki kai syneidisi, kai ofeiloun na symperiferontai metaxy tous me pneuma adelfosynis.
{Árthro 1:} Óli i ánthropi yeniúnde eléftheri ke ísi stin aksioprépia ke ta dhikeómata. Íne prikizméni me loyikí ke sinídhisi, ke ofílun na simberiféronde metaksí tus me pnévma adhelfosínis.
{[ˈarθro ˈena ‖} ˈoli i ˈanθropi ʝeˈɲunde eˈlefθeri ce ˈisi stin aksioˈprepia ce ta {ðiceˈomata ‖} ˈine priciˈzmeni me loʝiˈci ce {siˈniðisi |} ce oˈfilun na simberiˈferonde metaˈksi tuz me ˈpnevma aðelfoˈsinis]
Article 1: All human beings are born free and equal in dignity and rights. They are endowed with reason and conscience and should act towards one another in a spirit of brotherhood.
