= David Coleman (Australian politician) =

Australian politician (born 1974)

The Honourable David Coleman
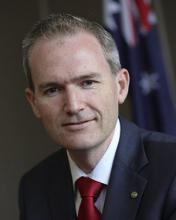

Minister for Immigration, Citizenship and Multicultural Affairs
- In office 28 August 2018 – 22 December 2020
- Prime Minister: Scott Morrison
- Preceded by: Peter Dutton
- Succeeded by: Alex Hawke

Assistant Minister to the Prime Minister for Mental Health and Suicide Prevention
- In office 22 December 2020 – 23 May 2022
- Prime Minister: Scott Morrison
- Preceded by: New title
- Succeeded by: Emma McBride

Assistant Minister for Finance
- In office 20 December 2017 – 28 August 2018
- Prime Minister: Malcolm Turnbull; Scott Morrison
- Minister: Mathias Cormann
- Preceded by: Office established
- Succeeded by: Zed Seselja

Member of the Australian Parliament for Banks
- In office 7 September 2013 – 3 May 2025
- Preceded by: Daryl Melham
- Succeeded by: Zhi Soon

Personal details
- Born: 5 March 1974 (age 52) Camden, New South Wales, Australia
- Party: Liberal
- Education: University of New South Wales
- Occupation: Politician
- Profession: Management consultant
- Website: aph.gov.au/D_Coleman_MP

David Bernard Coleman (born 5 March 1974) is an Australian former politician. He represented the New South Wales seat of Banks in the House of Representatives from 2013 to 2025 for the Liberal Party. Coleman served as the Assistant Minister to the Prime Minister for Mental Health and Suicide Prevention from December 2020 until May 2022. He previously served as Minister for Immigration, Citizenship, Migrant Services and Multicultural Affairs in the Morrison government from August 2018, although in December 2019 he took indefinite leave for personal reasons. He had earlier served as Assistant Minister for Finance in the Turnbull government from 2017 to 2018.

== Early life and education ==
Coleman was born in Camden, a south-western suburb of Sydney. He attended primary school at Saint Thomas à Becket primary school in Lewisham; and completed his schooling at the Christian Brothers' High School, also in Lewisham. Coleman studied at the University of New South Wales, where he graduated with a Bachelor of Arts and Bachelor of Laws, and was president of the UNSW Student Guild in 1997.

== Career ==
Before entering politics, Coleman worked for global management consulting firm McKinsey & Co, LookSmart, dStore, and since 2005, in a variety of roles for PBL Media and the Nine Network where he was the director of strategy and digital. Coleman entered Liberal preselection contests for Cook in 2007 and Bradfield in 2010; but he was unsuccessful in receiving Liberal endorsement. Before his election to Parliament, Coleman held directorships with ninemsn Pty Limited (2008–13), Australian News Channel Pty Limited (2008–13), and Yellow Brick Road Holdings Limited (2011–13).

At the 2013 federal election Coleman defeated the incumbent Labor member for Banks, Daryl Melham, who had held the seat for 23 years. Coleman recorded a two-party preferred swing of 3.28 points in his favour; and became the first non-Labor member to hold the seat since the Division of Banks was created in 1949.

=== Ministerial career ===
Coleman was appointed Assistant Minister for Finance in December 2017, in the Second Turnbull Ministry. In the August 2018 leadership spills, he reportedly supported Malcolm Turnbull in the first vote and Scott Morrison in the second. He was subsequently appointed Minister for Immigration, Citizenship and Multicultural Affairs in the First Morrison Ministry. After the government's re-election at the 2019 election, his title was changed to Minister for Immigration, Citizenship, Migrant Services and Multicultural Affairs.

In December 2019, it was announced that Coleman would be taking indefinite leave for personal reasons, with Alan Tudge taking over his portfolio as acting minister. He formally remained as a minister until a December 2020 reshuffle, in which he was instead appointed Assistant Minister to the Prime Minister for Mental Health and Suicide Prevention. He served in this portfolio until May 2022, following the appointment of the Albanese ministry.

=== Opposition ===
Coleman was re-elected as Member for Banks in 2022. He was appointed as Shadow Minister for Communications in the shadow ministry of Peter Dutton on 12 February 2023.

In 2024, Coleman as Shadow Minister for Communications supported the Labor government plans for an Age verification system in social media.

== Personal life and views ==
Coleman is a member of the Moderate/Modern Liberal faction of the Liberal Party.

Coleman was in favour of legalising same-sex marriage in the 2017 postal survey.

Coleman is married to Dotte Derrickson and they have two children.

Parliament of Australia
Preceded by Daryl Melham	Member for Banks; 2013–2025	Succeeded by Zhi Soon
Political offices
New ministerial post	Assistant Minister for Finance; 2017–2018	Succeeded by Zed Seselja
Preceded by Peter Dutton	Minister for Immigration, Citizenship and Multicultural Affairs; 2018–2019	Succeeded by Himself as Minister for Immigration, Citizenship, Migrant Services and Multicultural Affairs
Preceded by Himself as Minister for Immigration, Citizenship and Multicultural Affairs	Minister for Immigration, Citizenship, Migrant Services and Multicultural Affairs; 2019–2020	Succeeded by Alex Hawke
New title	Assistant Minister to the Prime Minister for Mental Health and Suicide Prevention; 2020–2022	Succeeded by Emma McBride as Assistant Minister for Mental Health and Suicide Prevention
