= Division of Banks =

Australian federal electoral division

Coordinates: 33.967°S 151.066°E

Banks Australian House of Representatives Division
- Interactive map of electorate boundaries from the 2025 federal election
- Created: 1949
- MP: Zhi Soon
- Party: Labor
- Namesake: Sir Joseph Banks
- Electors: 119,385 (2025)
- Area: 61 km^{2} (23.6 sq mi)
- Demographic: Inner metropolitan
Electorates around Banks:
Fowler	Watson	Barton
Hughes	Banks	Barton
Hughes	Hughes	Cook

The Division of Banks is an Australian electoral division in the state of New South Wales. It is located in the southwestern suburbs of Sydney.

Banks is represented by Zhi Soon for the Australian Labor Party.

== History ==
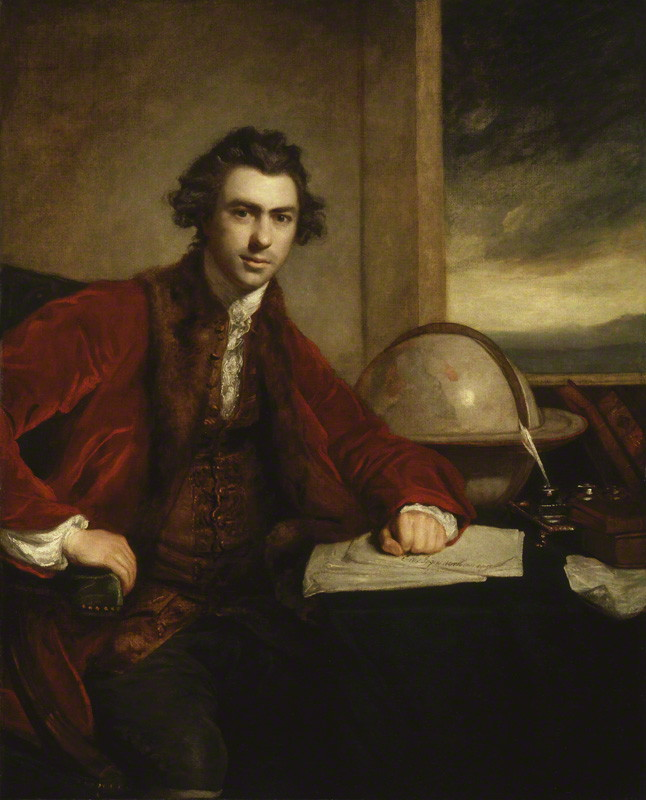
Sir Joseph Banks, the division's namesake. A 1773 portrait by Joshua Reynolds.

The division was created in 1949 and is named for Sir Joseph Banks, the British naturalist and botanist who accompanied James Cook on his voyage to Australia in 1770. It has always been based in the south-western and southern suburbs of Sydney, including the suburbs of Padstow, Panania, Peakhurst and Revesby.

Up until 2013, it was held since its creation by the Australian Labor Party, but has grown increasingly marginal from the 1990s onward. It was almost lost in 2004, but the 2006 redistribution added areas to the west in Bankstown and Condell Park which strengthened the seat for Labor. Those areas were lost in the 2009 redistribution, which pushed Banks into new areas to the east, around Hurstville. Long-term Labor member, Daryl Melham, was defeated at the 2013 federal election by David Coleman. Coleman became the first non-Labor member for the seat, breaking a 64-year tradition. In 2025, Zhi Soon defeated Liberal incumbent, David Coleman to return the seat to Labor for the first time in 12 years.

== Geography ==
Banks is located in parts of the local government areas of Canterbury Bankstown and Georges River in the southwestern suburbs of Sydney. It includes the suburbs of Carss Park, Connells Point, East Hills, Hurstville Grove, Kyle Bay, Lugarno, Milperra, Mortdale, Narwee, Oatley, Padstow, Padstow Heights, Panania, Peakhurst, Peakhurst Heights, Picnic Point and Revesby Heights; and parts of Bankstown, Beverly Hills, Blakehurst, Hurstville, Penshurst, Punchbowl, South Hurstville, Revesby, Roselands and Riverwood.

Since 1984, federal electoral division boundaries in Australia have been determined at redistributions by a redistribution committee appointed by the Australian Electoral Commission. Redistributions occur for the boundaries of divisions in a particular state, and they occur every seven years, or sooner if a state's representation entitlement changes or when divisions of a state are malapportioned.

== Demographics ==
2021 Australian census
Ancestry
Response	Banks	NSW	Australia
Chinese	20.0%	7.2%	5.5%
English	18.4%	29.8%	33.0%
Australian	18.4%	28.6%	29.9%
Irish	6.1%	9.1%	9.5%
Greek	6.0%	1.8%	1.7%
Country of birth
Response	Banks	NSW	Australia
Australia	55.9%	65.4%	66.9%
China	9.9%	3.1%	2.2%
Nepal	3.3%	0.8%	0.5%
Vietnam	1.9%	1.2%	1.0%
Hong Kong	1.8%	0.6%	0.4%
Lebanon	1.8%	0.8%	0.3%
Religious affiliation
Response	Banks	NSW	Australia
No religion	27.1%	32.8%	38.4%
Catholicism	22.7%	22.4%	20.0%
Anglicanism	8.5%	11.9%	9.8%
Eastern Orthodoxy	8.5%	2.5%	2.1%
Islam	6.3%	4.3%	3.2%
Language spoken at home
Response	Banks	NSW	Australia
English	49.1%	67.6%	72.0%
Mandarin	9.2%	3.4%	2.7%
Cantonese	7.3%	2.8%	1.2%
Arabic	5.4%	2.8%	1.4%
Greek	3.8%	1.0%	0.9%
Nepali	3.4%	0.8%	0.5%

== Members ==
Image	Member	Party	Term	Notes
	Eric Costa (1900–1976)	Labor	10 December 1949 – 29 September 1969	Retired
	Vince Martin (1920–2001)	Labor	25 October 1969 – 19 September 1980	Lost preselection and retired
	John Mountford (1933–2022)	Labor	18 October 1980 – 19 February 1990	Retired
	Daryl Melham (1954–)	Labor	24 March 1990 – 7 September 2013	Lost seat
	David Coleman (1974–)	Liberal	7 September 2013 – 3 May 2025	Served as minister under Turnbull and Morrison. Lost seat
	Zhi Soon (1985–)	Labor	3 May 2025 – present	Incumbent.

== Election results ==
2025 Australian federal election: Banks
Party	Candidate	Votes	%	±%
Liberal	David Coleman	38,683	39.10	−5.50
Labor	Zhi Soon	36,039	36.43	+0.59
Greens	Natalie Hanna	11,756	11.88	+3.27
One Nation	Todd Nicol	3,666	3.71	+0.44
Trumpet of Patriots	Allan Taruste	3,430	3.47	+3.47
Libertarian	Marika Momircevski	2,678	2.71	+1.54
Independent	John Coyne	1,995	2.02	+2.02
Democrats	Phillip Pearce	688	0.70	+0.70
Total formal votes		98,935	90.00	−3.16
Informal votes		10,998	10.00	+3.16
Turnout		109,933	92.13	+1.61
Two-party-preferred result
Labor	Zhi Soon	51,830	52.39	+5.03
Liberal	David Coleman	47,105	47.61	−5.03
Labor gain from Liberal		Swing	+5.03	

Alluvial diagram illustrating the full distribution of preferences in the seat of Banks for the 2025 Federal Election
