= Vince Martin (politician) =

Australian politician

Vincent Martin
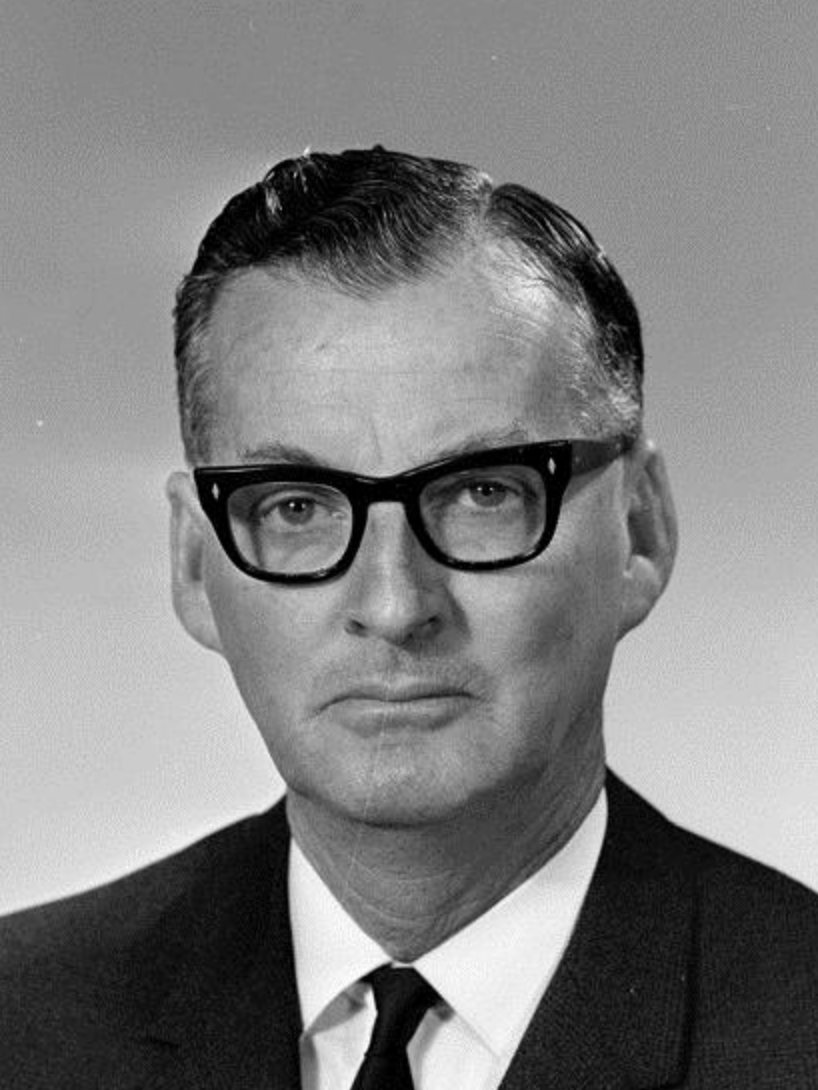

Member of the Australian Parliament for Banks
- In office 25 October 1969 – 19 September 1980
- Preceded by: Eric Costa
- Succeeded by: John Mountford

Personal details
- Born: 14 May 1920 Sydney
- Died: 10 March 2001 (aged 80) Woy Woy, New South Wales
- Party: Labor
- Occupation: Public servant

Vincent Joseph Martin (14 May 1920 – 10 March 2001) was an Australian politician, the son of Joe and Elsie Martin. He attended Marist Brothers Darlinghurst, leaving school at age 14½ and entering the State and then Commonwealth public service.

Martin was secretary of the Panania branch of the Australian Labor Party from 1949, and in 1969 was elected to the Australian House of Representatives as the member for Banks. He held the seat until 1980, when he lost preselection to John Mountford.

When Martin died at Woy Woy, New South Wales in 2001, having finally succumbed to cancer, mourners included Les Johnson, Leo McLeay, Daryl Melham, Kevin Stewart, John Della Bosca, Pat Rogan, Kevin Greene, Marie Andrews, and Paul Keating.

Parliament of Australia
Preceded by Eric Costa	Member for Banks; 1969–1980	Succeeded by John Mountford
