= DStore =

Defunct Australian online retailer

dstore Australia Pty Ltd
- Company type: Public (Unlisted) Company
- Website type: e-commerce
- Available in: English
- Founded: 1999
- Headquarters: Fortitude Valley, Queensland, Australia
- Key people: Andrew Cooper, CEO
- Industry: Retail
- Website: dstore.com.au
- Launched: 1999
- Current status: Defunct (2015)

dstore was an Australian-based online retailer. It offered a range of goods across a number of sectors.

== History ==
The original dstore was established in January 1999 and was originally backed by some of the biggest names in Australian business including the founder of LookSmart, Evan Thornley, and Kerry Packer's ninemsn. It was sold for an undisclosed sum to the Harris Scarfe group in November 2000. In April 2001, Harris Scarfe was placed in receivership and dstore was offered for sale by receivers and managers, Ferrier Hodgson.

HotShed Retail acquired dstore on 10 September 2001. HotShed Retail paid a reported $615,000 for dstore and immediately relaunched it using HotShed's technology platform. A break-even result was reported in the 2001 Christmas quarter. HotShed's directors at the time were Brisbane brothers Andrew and Tim Cooper. Tim Cooper subsequently left the business.

As of September 2015, dstore.com.au, then under the sole directorship of Andrew Cooper, was shut down with liquidation headed by Vincent's Chartered Accountants. Many customer orders from May 2015 onward were left unfulfilled and thousands of dollars' worth of gift vouchers became invalid (due to unsecured creditor status).

== Locations ==
dstore operated from Birkdale, Brisbane, but publicly stated that it had 'fulfilment centres' located in capital cities around Australia as well as in the United States and Hong Kong.

== Product and services ==
After being acquired by HotShed Retail, dstore initially sold VHS movies, CDs and console games. It then expanded into gifts, DVDs, fragrances, cosmetics, homewares, toys, computers, electronics, books etc.
