= Greek in Australia =

Greek language in Australia

Australian Greek
- Native to: Australia
- Ethnicity: Greek Australians
- Language family: Indo-European: Hellenic; Greek; (disputed); Attic–Ionic; Attic; Koine; Demotic; Standard Modern Greek; Australian Greek
- Early form: Proto-Greek
- Writing system: Greek alphabet Greeklish

Language codes
- ISO 639-3: –
- IETF: el-AU

Greek in Australia also referred to as Greco-Australian or Australian Greek is a dialect of the Greek language that is spoken by the Greek diaspora in Australia. It is spoken by native Greek-speaking immigrants living in Australia as well as Australians of Greek descent.

== Characteristics ==
In the Greek language of Australia certain Greek words are replaced by Hellenised versions of English words. Although the exact number of speakers is unknown, researcher Anastasios Tamis suggests that the dialect is mostly spoken by second- and third-generation Greeks, however many first-generation Greeks and Greek immigrants to Australia have also adopted the dialect.

Although the words brought into the dialect have English roots, these words were Hellenised in order to agree with modern Greek grammar rules. For example, the Greek word for "The book" is "Το βιβλίο" (To vivlío). In the Greco-Australian dialect, it is commonly referred to as "Το μπούκο" (To boúko). The additional omicron was added at the end to make it a neuter noun, allowing it to agree with Greek grammatical rules. Most adopted English words are neuter nouns in Greek.

Greek surname conventions are that women use the genitive form of their family's last name typically until marriage, when they may adopt their husband's last name instead. However, as the English language does not distinguish between masculine and feminine surnames, most Greek people in English-speaking countries, including the Greeks living in Australia and Australians of Greek descent, adopt their father's surname and, in accordance with given English surnames, they do not change it to its genitive form. As a result, the name "Μαρία Παπαδοπούλου" (Maria Papadopoúlou) is rendered as "Μαρία Παπαδόπουλος" (Maria Papadópoulos) in English-speaking countries, such as Australia, despite it breaking Greek grammatical conventions. Writer Dean Kalimniou suggests that, as Greek immigrants adopt their parent's unaltered surname, they may at times end up using their mothers' last name instead, as is the case with Kalimniou's own family.

== Origin ==
The Greek spoken in Australia is based on standard Greek, which is spoken by approximately 13.5 million people worldwide. The Greek Australian varieties have originated upon the immigration of Greeks to Australia. Many Greek immigrants were unable to speak English proficiently at the time, so adopted some English words into their language in order to better communicate with Australian residents. It is also thought that these adoptions were made to help clear communication between Greek immigrants and their children, who were predominantly Greek speakers.

The Greek language in Australia, functioning in a bilingual environment without diglossia under the influence of the dominant English language, is never homogenous and hardly ever self contained as it experiences serious functional limitations, restricted to a few language domains. During the last 170 years of Greek settlement in Australia, Greek migrants are undergoing language shift as a result of a number of socio-economic variables, including the new concepts that they meet in their new environment and naturally their language contact with the dominant language.

— Anastasios Tamis

The development of the Greek varieties in Australia is attributed to the influence of the English language on Greek speakers in Australia. Most Greek Australians have not abandoned the Greek language, despite some being second or third-generation Australians. Greco-Australian has also eased the learning of the Greek language for the Greek diaspora. The mix of the Greek and English languages is sometimes credited to factors including the dominance of the English language in Australia, the Australian educational system, interracial marriages, Greek institutions in Australia and the Greek Orthodox Church of Australia. Ethnic segregation between Greek immigrants and Anglo-Celtic Australians may have also forced Greeks to adopt more English words in order to merge into Australian society.

== Example words ==
English	Greco-Australian	Romanisation	Greek	Romanisation
The book	Το μπούκο	To mpoúko	Το βιβλίο	To vivlío
The car	Το κάρο	To káro	Το αυτοκίνητο	To aftokínito
The market	Η μαρκέτα (Note: When used, it refers to a regular shop.)	I markéta	Η αγορά	I agorá
The supermarket	Η σουπερμαρκέτα	I soupermarkéta	Η υπεραγορά	I yperagorá
The ticket	Το τικέτο	To tikéto	Το εισιτήριο	To eisitírio
The petrol	Το πετρέλιο	To petrélio	Η βενζίνη	I venzíni
The petrol station	Το πετρελιονάδικο	To petrelionádiko	Το βενζινάδικο	To venzinádiko
The bank	Η μπάνκα	I mpánka	Η τράπεζα	I trápeza
The hotel	Το χοτέλι	To chotéli	Το ξενοδοχείο	To xenodocheío
The carpet	To καρπέτo	To karpéto	Το χαλί	To chalí
The yard	To γιάρι	To giari	Η αυλή	I avlí
The fridge	Η φρίζα	I phríza	Το ψυγείο	To psygeío
The roof	Το ρούφι	To roúphi	Η στέγη	I stégi
The roof repairer	Ο ρουφάνιος	O rouphánios	Ο επισκευαστής στέγης	O episkevatís stégis
The floor	Το φλόρι	To phlóri	Το πάτωμα	To pátōma
The chops	Τα τσόπια (Note: When used, it refers to meat chops.)	Ta tsópia	Οι μπριζόλες	Oi mprizóles
The chips	Τα τσίπια	Ta tsípia	Τα πατατάκια	Ta patatákia
The basket	Η μπασκέτα	I mpaskéta	Το καλάθι	To kaláthi

== Phonology ==
Australian Greek has several phonetic differences from Standard Greek.

Aspiration

p k t have become aspirated becoming pʰ kʰ tʰ.

Palatalisation

the Greek l has been palatalized becoming lʲ
