= Eric Costa =

Australian politician

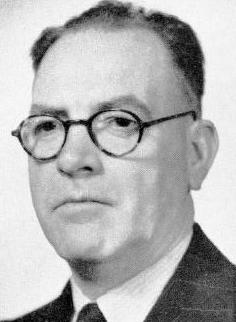

Member of the Australian Parliament for Banks
- In office 10 December 1949 – 29 September 1969
- Preceded by: New seat
- Succeeded by: Vince Martin

Personal details
- Born: 10 December 1900 Warialda, New South Wales
- Died: 23 September 1976 (aged 75)
- Party: Labor
- Occupation: Postmaster

Dominic Eric Costa (10 December 1900 – 23 September 1976) was an Australian politician. He was an Australian Labor Party member of the Australian House of Representatives from 1949 to 1969, representing the electorate of Banks.

Costa was born at Warialda, New South Wales and was educated in Newcastle and Sydney. He worked for the Postmaster-General's Department for 30 years, as messenger, postmaster, trainer in army communications procedure during World War II and at the time of his election to parliament, lecturer at the Postal Training School in Sydney. He was state president of the Australian Third Division Telegraphists' and Postal Clerks' Union from 1939 to 1949 and was secretary of the Labor Party's Lang federal electoral council. Costa had also been a prominent rugby league footballer in earlier years.

Costa was elected to the House of Representatives for the new western Sydney seat of Banks at the 1949 federal election and was re-elected seven times. He was associated with the right wing of the Labor Party. In 1959, he declared his support for abolishing both the New South Wales Legislative Council and the Australian Senate. He became a member of the caucus economic policy committee in 1964. Costa retired at the 1969 election.

Parliament of Australia
New division	Member for Banks; 1949–1969	Succeeded by Vince Martin
