= Zhi Soon =

Australian politician

Zhi Soon MP

Member of the Australian Parliament for Banks
- Incumbent
- Assumed office 3 May 2025
- Preceded by: David Coleman

Personal details
- Born: Soon Xian Zhi; 1985 (age 40–41) Kuala Lumpur, Malaysia
- Party: Labor
- Education: Australian National University
- Occupation: Public servant

Xian Zhi Soon (Chinese: 孙先志; born 1985) is an Australian politician. He is a member of the Australian House of Representatives representing the Division of Banks for the Australian Labor Party. At the 2025 Australian federal election, he defeated the sitting member David Coleman, who had held the seat since 2013. Soon first contested the seat in the 2022 federal election, losing to Coleman.

Soon was awarded the Young Australian of the Year in the ACT in 2008, and worked as a diplomat in Afghanistan. Soon also worked in the Behavioural Insights Team, a UK-based social purpose corporation known unofficially as the "Nudge Unit", was the youngest ever appointee to the New South Wales Board of Studies, and worked in the prime ministerial office of Kevin Rudd.

Parliament of Australia
Preceded by David Coleman	Member for Banks; 2025–present	Incumbent
