= John Mountford (politician) =

Australian politician (1933–2022)

Member of the Australian Parliament for Banks
- In office 18 October 1980 – 19 February 1990
- Preceded by: Vince Martin
- Succeeded by: Daryl Melham

Personal details
- Born: 21 November 1933 Punchbowl, New South Wales, Australia
- Died: 17 June 2022 (aged 88) Kiama, New South Wales, Australia
- Party: Labor
- Occupation: Accountant; Public servant

John Graham Mountford (21 November 1933 – 17 June 2022) was an Australian politician. He was a member of the Australian Labor Party (ALP) and served in the House of Representatives from 1980 to 1990, representing the New South Wales seat of Banks. He was previously mayor of Canterbury from 1977 to 1980.

== Early life ==
Mountford was born on 21 November 1933 in Punchbowl, New South Wales. He was a chartered accountant and before entering politics was a manager in the promotions and development section of the New South Wales Department of Tourism.

== Politics ==
Mountford became secretary of the ALP's Punchbowl branch in 1964. He was elected to the Canterbury Municipal Council in 1974 and served as mayor of Canterbury from 1977 to 1980.

Mountford was elected to the House of Representatives at the 1980 federal election, retaining the seat of Banks for the ALP after defeating the incumbent MP Vince Martin for preselection. He was re-elected on three occasions. In parliament, Mountford served as chair of the House Standing Committee on Expenditure from 1986 to 1987 and as chair of the House Standing Committee on Procedure from 1987 to 1990. In 1988 he led an Australian delegation to the Council of Europe.

Mountford was a member of the Labor Right faction. In 1989, he faced a preselection challenge from Labor Left member Daryl Melham. He unsuccessfully sought the intervention of the ALP National Executive to protect his candidacy and forego a preselection ballot, citing branch stacking. ALP national secretary Bob Hogg determined there was no evidence of branch stacking and allowed the preselection ballot to proceed. Mountford was succeeded by Melham at the 1990 election.

== Personal life ==
Mountford had two children with his wife Val, but was predeceased by his son. He retired to Kiama Heights after previously living in Roselands, and died on 17 June 2022 at the age of 88.

Civic offices
Preceded by Colin Gordon Williams	Mayor of Canterbury; 1976–1980	Succeeded by Kevin Moss
Parliament of Australia
Preceded by Vince Martin	Member for Banks; 1980–1990	Succeeded by Daryl Melham
