= Daryl Melham =

Australian politician

Daryl Melham AM

Member of the Australian Parliament for Banks
- In office 24 March 1990 – 7 September 2013
- Preceded by: John Mountford
- Succeeded by: David Coleman

Personal details
- Born: 26 November 1954 (age 71) Sydney, New South Wales, Australia
- Party: Australian Labor Party
- Education: University of Sydney
- Occupation: Politician
- Profession: Barrister, solicitor
- Website: ALP web page

Daryl Melham AM (born 26 November 1954) is an Australian former politician. He was a Labor member of the Australian House of Representatives representing the Division of Banks in New South Wales from 1990 to 2013.

== Early life and education ==
Melham was born in Sydney, to a family of Lebanese descent and studied law and economics at the University of Sydney, earning an LL.B. and a B.Ec.

== Career ==
=== Legal career ===
Melham was a barrister and solicitor and a public defender before entering politics. He was vice-president of the New South Wales Labor Party from 1999 until 2002.

Melham worked as a solicitor with the Legal Aid Commission of New South Wales, specialising in criminal law from 1979 to 1987. He was subsequently admitted to the bar as a barrister, and was a public defender until his entry into federal politics in 1990. He is also a foundation member of the NSW Society of Labor Lawyers.

Melham is a Life Member and has served as President of the Revesby Workers' Club.

=== Political career ===
Elected to Parliament in 1990, Melham entered the Opposition Shadow Ministry following Labor's electoral defeat in 1996. He served as Shadow Minister for Aboriginal and Torres Strait Islander Affairs but resigned in 2000 after a policy disagreement with the then Labor leader Kim Beazley. He returned to the Opposition Shadow Ministry in 2001 and he was Shadow Minister for Housing, Urban Development and Local Government from December 2003, resigning from the front bench soon after the Labor Party's election defeat in October 2004.

Melham and colleague Lindsay Tanner were the only Labor MPs to openly speak out against the Howard government's proposed anti-terrorism legislation which provides for harsher punishments for sedition and grants police new shoot-to-kill powers. Melham also spoke out against the Howard government's changes to the rules concerning political donations, which allowed donations of up to A$10,000 to be given to political parties without public disclosure. Melham was quoted as saying in May 2006: "We're going to have the best politicians money can buy, but we won't see [how much]".

Melham resigned as the Federal Labor caucus chair on 30 October 2012. Following the 2010 election, Melham's usually high margin in Banks was reduced to a low 1.5%. He lost the seat at the 2013 federal election against the Liberal candidate, David Coleman.

Parliament of Australia
| Preceded by John Mountford | Member for Banks; 1990–2013 | Succeeded by David Coleman |
