= Modern Greek grammar =

Grammar of the Modern Greek language

The grammar of Modern Greek, as spoken in present-day Greece and Cyprus, is essentially that of Demotic Greek, but it has also assimilated certain elements of Katharevousa, the archaic, learned variety of Greek imitating Classical Greek forms, which used to be the official language of Greece through much of the 19th and 20th centuries. Modern Greek grammar has preserved many features of Ancient Greek, but has also undergone changes in a similar direction as many other modern Indo-European languages, from more synthetic to more analytic structures.

== General characteristics ==
=== Syntax ===
The predominant word order in Greek is SVO (subject–verb–object), but word order is quite freely variable, with VSO and other orders as frequent alternatives. Within the noun phrase, adjectives commonly precede the noun (for example, το μεγάλο σπίτι, [to meˈɣalo ˈspiti], 'the big house'). Adjectives may also follow the noun when marked for emphasis, as in ένα βιβλίο νέο, 'a new book', instead of the usual order ένα νέο βιβλίο. When, however, the adjective describes an intrinsic characteristic, it often follows the noun. For example, the order γάλα κατσικίσιο 'goat milk', with the neuter form of the adjective κατσικίσιος 'referring or belonging to goats' following the noun, is about equally common as the order κατσικίσιο γάλα. Possessors generally follow the noun (for example, το σπίτι μου, [to ˈspiti mu], 'my house'; το σπίτι του Νίκου 'Nick's house'). If both an adjective and a possessive occur, the possessive may be placed before the noun: το μεγάλο μου σπίτι ⇔ το μεγάλο σπίτι μου, 'my big house'. Some other alternative constructions involving the opposite order of constituents are possible as a marked option (e.g. το σπίτι το μεγάλο 'the big house' – not the small house; του Νίκου το σπίτι 'Nick's house' – not Maria's house)

Greek is a pro-drop language, and subjects are typically not overtly expressed whenever they are inferable from context. While the word order of the major elements within the clause is fairly free, certain grammatical elements attach to the verb as clitics and form a rigidly ordered group together with it; this applies particularly to unstressed object pronouns, negation particles, the tense particle θα [θa], and the subjunctive particle να [na]. Likewise, possessive pronouns are enclitic to the nouns they modify.

=== Morphology ===
Greek is a largely synthetic (inflectional) language. Although the complexity of the inflectional system has been somewhat reduced in comparison to Ancient Greek, there is also a considerable degree of continuity in the morphological system, and Greek still has a somewhat archaic character compared with other Indo-European languages of Europe. Nouns, adjectives and verbs are each divided into several inflectional classes (declension classes and conjugation classes), which have different sets of endings. In the nominals, the ancient inflectional system is well preserved, with the exception of the loss of one case, the dative, and the restructuring of several of the inflectional classes. In the verbal system, the loss of synthetic inflectional categories is somewhat greater, and several new analytic (periphrastic) constructions have evolved instead.

=== Characteristics of the Balkan language area ===
Modern Greek shares several syntactic characteristics with its geographical neighbours, with which it forms the so-called Balkan language area (Sprachbund). Among these characteristics are:

- The lack of an infinitive. In Greek, verbal complementation in contexts where English would use an infinitive is typically formed with the help of finite (subjunctive) verb forms (e.g. θέλω να πάω, [ˈθelo na ˈpao], literally 'I-want that I-go', i.e. 'I want to go').
- The merger of the dative and the genitive case. In Greek, indirect objects are expressed partly through genitive forms of nouns or pronouns, and partly through a periphrasis consisting of the preposition σε ([se], 'to') and the accusative.
- The use of a future construction derived from the verb 'want' (θέλει να [ˈθeli na] → θα [θa]).
- A tendency to use pre-verbal clitic object pronouns redundantly (clitic doubling), doubling an object that is also expressed elsewhere in the clause: for example, το είδα το αυτοκίνητο ([to ˈiða to aftoˈcinito], 'I saw it, the car", literally 'It I-saw the car').

On the other hand, one prominent feature of the Balkan language area that Greek does not share is the use of a postposed definite article. The Greek article (like the Ancient Greek one) stands before the noun.

== Accent ==
Modern Greek has a stress accent, similar to English. The accent is notated with a stroke (΄) over the accented vowel and is called οξεία (oxeia, "acute") or τόνος (tonos, "accent") in Greek. The former term is taken from one of the accents used in polytonic orthography which officially became obsolete in 1982.

As in Ancient Greek, in Modern Greek the accent cannot be placed before the antepenultimate syllable. As a result, in many words that have the accent on their antepenultimate in their base form, the stress shifts to the next syllable in inflection forms with longer affixes. For example, nom sg μάθημα ([ˈmaθima], "lesson") but gen sg μαθήματος [maˈθimatos] and nom pl μαθήματα [maˈθimata] etc. In some words, the accent moves forward even without the addition of a syllable. For example, nom sg άνθρωπος ([ˈanθropos], "human") but gen sg ανθρώπου [anˈθropu], gen pl ανθρώπων [anˈθropon] and acc pl ανθρώπους [anˈθropus]. This accentuation is inherited from Ancient Greek, where long vowels and diphthongs occupied two morae, having the same effect as the addition of a syllable.

Accent shifts can also be triggered by the addition of enclitic elements after a word. Enclitics are phonologically weak personal pronouns that form a single phonological unit together with the word they are attached to. The three-syllable rule then applies to the unit as a whole. When the previous word is accented on the antepenultimate syllable, the enclitic causes the ultimate syllable to be accented too. For example, δάσκαλος ([ˈðaskalos], "teacher") but δάσκαλός μου ([ˌðaskaˈloz‿mu], "my teacher") and φόρεσε ([ˈforese], "wear (imp)") but φόρεσέ το ([ˌforeˈse‿to], "wear it"). If two enclitic elements are added to a word, the extra accent appears on the first enclitic. For example, φέρε μού το ([ˌfere‿ˈmu‿to], "bring it to me").

As a rule, monosyllabic words do not carry an orthographic accent, except for a few words where the accent marker is used to orthographically distinguish them from an otherwise homonymous item (e.g. ή [i], "or", distinguished from the feminine article η). Moreover, weak personal pronouns are accented in cases where they may be mistaken for enclitics. For example, ο σκύλος μού γάβγισε ([o ˈscilos mu ˈɣavʝise], "the dog barked at me") instead of ο σκύλος μου γάβγισε ([o ˈsciloz‿mu ˈɣavʝise], "my dog barked").

== Verbs ==
=== Aspects and moods ===
Greek verb morphology is structured around a basic 2-by-2 contrast of two aspects:

- imperfective
- perfective

and two tenses:

- past
- non-past (or present)

The aspects are expressed by distinct verb stems, while the tenses are marked mainly by different sets of endings. Of the four possible combinations, only three can be used in indicative function: the present (i.e. imperfective non-past), the imperfect (i.e. imperfective past) and the aorist (i.e. perfective past). All four combinations can be used in subjunctive function, where they are typically preceded by the particle να or by one of a set of subordinating conjunctions. There are also two imperatives, one for each aspect.

=== Periphrastic constructions ===
In addition to these basic forms, Greek also has several periphrastic verb constructions.

==== θα ====
All the basic forms can be combined with the future particle θα (historically a contraction of θέλει να, 'want to').

===== Future tense =====
- θα combined with the imperfective present form creates the imperfective future
- θα combined with the perfective present form creates the perfective future

===== θα combined with past forms =====
- θα combined with the imperfective past form is used to form the conditional mood
- θα combined with the perfective past form is used to form the inferential mood

==== έχω ====
There is also a perfect, which is expressed with an inflected form of the auxiliary verb έχω ('have'). It occurs as a past perfect (pluperfect), present perfect, future perfect, and conditional perfect, formed by conjugating έχω in the imperfect, present, future and conditional forms respectively, followed by the aparemphato as described below.

=== Non-finite forms ===
Modern Greek verbs additionally have three non-finite forms.

There is a form traditionally called "απαρέμφατο" (i.e. 'infinitive', literally the 'invariant form'), which is historically derived from the perfective (aorist) infinitive, but has today lost all syntactical functions typically associated with that category. It is used only to form the periphrastic perfect and pluperfect, and is always formally identical to the 3rd person singular of the perfective non-past.

There is also a passive participle, typically ending in -menos (-meni, -meno), which is inflected as a regular adjective. Its use is either as a canonical adjective, or as a part of a second, alternative perfect periphrasis with transitive verbs.

Finally, there is another invariant form, formed from the present tense and typically ending in -ontas, which is variably called either a participle or a gerund by modern authors. It is historically derived from an old present participle, and its sole use today is to form non-finite adjunct adverbial clauses of time or manner, roughly corresponding to an -ing participle in English.

- Regular perfect periphrasis, with aparemphato ("invariant form"), for example:
  - Έχω γράψει την επιταγή ([ˈexo ˈɣrapsi tin epitaˈʝi], 'I have written the cheque')
- Alternative perfect periphrasis, with passive participle, for example:
  - Έχω την επιταγή γραμμένη ([ˈexo tin epitaˈʝi ɣraˈmeni], 'I have written the cheque')
- Adverbial clause with present participle/gerund form, for example:
  - Έτρεξε στον δρόμο τραγουδώντας ([ˈetrekse ston ˈðromo traɣuˈðondas], 'he ran along the street singing')

The tables below exemplify the range of forms with those of one large inflectional class of verbs, the first conjugation.

=== First conjugation ===
Aspect	Stem		Non-past	Past	Imperative
Imperfective	γραφ-		Present (indic. + subj.)	Imperfect (indic. + subj.)	[continuous]
Imperfective	γραφ-		('I write')	('I was writing')	('write!')
Imperfective	γραφ-	1 sg.	γράφω	έγραφα	
Imperfective	γραφ-	2 sg.	γράφεις	έγραφες	γράφε
Imperfective	γραφ-	3 sg.	γράφει	έγραφε	
Imperfective	γραφ-	1 pl.	γράφουμε	γράφαμε	
Imperfective	γραφ-	2 pl.	γράφετε	γράφατε	γράφετε
Imperfective	γραφ-	3 pl.	γράφουν	έγραφαν	
Perfective	γραψ-		Present perfective (subj. only)	Aorist (indic. + subj.)	[once]
Perfective	γραψ-		('that I write')	('I wrote')	('write!')
Perfective	γραψ-	1 sg.	γράψω	έγραψα	
Perfective	γραψ-	2 sg.	γράψεις	έγραψες	γράψε
Perfective	γραψ-	3 sg.	γράψει	έγραψε	
Perfective	γραψ-	1 pl.	γράψουμε	γράψαμε	
Perfective	γραψ-	2 pl.	γράψετε	γράψατε	γράψτε
Perfective	γραψ-	3 pl.	γράψουν	έγραψαν	
Perfect	εχ- γράψει		Present Perf. (indic. + subj.)	Past Perf. (indic. + subj.)	
Perfect	εχ- γράψει		('I have written')	('I had written')	
Perfect	εχ- γράψει	1 sg.	έχω γράψει	είχα γράψει	
Perfect	εχ- γράψει	2 sg.	έχεις γράψει	είχες γράψει	
Perfect	εχ- γράψει	3 sg.	έχει γράψει	είχε γράψει	
Perfect	εχ- γράψει	1 pl.	έχουμε γράψει	είχαμε γράψει	
Perfect	εχ- γράψει	2 pl.	έχετε γράψει	είχατε γράψει	
Perfect	εχ- γράψει	3 pl.	έχουν γράψει	είχαν γράψει	

	With subordinating particle "να"				With future particle "θα"			
	Non-past		Past		Non-past		Past	
Imperfective	να γράφει	'(that) he write', 'to be writing'	να έγραφε	'(that) he was writing, 'to have been writing'	θα γράφει	'he will be writing'	θα έγραφε	'he would write'
Perfective	να γράψει	'(that) he write', 'to write'	να έγραψε	'(that) he wrote', 'to have written'	θα γράψει	'he will write'	θα έγραψε	'he probably wrote'
Perfect	να έχει γράψει	'(that) he have written', 'to have written'	να είχε γράψει	'(that) he had written', 'to have had written'	θα έχει γράψει	'he will have written'	θα είχε γράψει	'he would have written'

=== Second conjugation ===
Below are the corresponding forms of two subtypes of another class, the second conjugation. Only the basic forms are shown here; the periphrastic combinations are formed as shown above. While the person-number endings are quite regular across all verbs within each of these classes, the formation of the two basic stems for each verb displays a lot of irregularity and can follow any of a large number of idiosyncratic patterns.

	verbs in -(ά)ω/ώ (αγαπώ 'love')		verbs in -ώ ( ← -εω) (οδηγώ 'lead')	
	Present	Imperfect	Present	Imperfect
1 sg.	αγαπώ, αγαπάω	αγαπούσα, αγάπαγα	οδηγώ	οδηγούσα
2 sg.	αγαπάς	αγαπούσες, αγάπαγες	οδηγείς	οδηγούσες
3 sg.	αγαπάει, αγαπά	αγαπούσε, αγάπαγε	οδηγεί	οδηγούσε
1 pl.	αγαπάμε	αγαπούσαμε, αγαπάγαμε	οδηγούμε	οδηγούσαμε
2 pl.	αγαπάτε	αγαπούσατε, αγαπάγατε	οδηγείτε	οδηγούσατε
3 pl.	αγαπούν(ε), αγαπάν(ε)	αγαπούσανε, αγάπαγαν(ε)	οδηγούν	οδηγούσαν(ε)
	Pres. perfective (subj.)	Aorist	Pres. perfective (subj)	Aorist
1 sg.	αγαπήσω	αγάπησα	οδηγήσω	οδήγησα
2 sg.	αγαπήσεις	αγάπησες	οδηγήσεις	οδήγησες
3 sg.	αγαπήσει	αγάπησε	οδηγήσει	οδήγησε
1 pl.	αγαπήσουμε	αγαπήσαμε	οδηγήσουμε	οδηγήσαμε
2 pl.	αγαπήσετε	αγαπήσατε	οδηγήσετε	οδηγήσατε
3 pl.	αγαπήσουν	αγάπησαν(ε)	οδηγήσουν	οδήγησαν

=== Augment ===
The use of the past tense prefix ε- (e-), the so-called augment, shows some variation and irregularity between verb classes. In regular (demotic) verbs in standard modern Greek, the prefix is used depending on a stress rule, which specifies that each past tense verb form has its stress on the third syllable from the last (the antepenultimate). As such, the prefix is only inserted when the unprefixed form would only contain one or two syllables. In these regular verbs, the augment always appears as έ-. A number of frequent verbs have irregular forms involving other vowels, mostly η- (i-), for example, θέλω → ήθελα ('want'). In addition, verbs from the learned tradition partly preserve more complex patterns inherited from ancient Greek. In learned compound verbs with adverbial prefixes such as περι- (peri-) or υπο- (ipo-), the augment is inserted between the prefix and the verb stem (for example, περι-γράφω → περι-έ-γραψα ('describe'). Where the prefix itself ends in a vowel, the vowels in this position may be subject to further assimilation rules, such as in υπο-γράφω → υπ-έ-γραψα ('sign'). In addition, verbs whose stem begins in a vowel may also display vocalic changes instead of a syllabic augment, as in ελπίζω → ήλπιζα ('hope').

Type of verb	Present tense		Meaning	Past tenses			
Type of verb	Present tense		Meaning	Perfective		Imperfective	
Simple	γράφω	[ˈɣrafo]	write	έγραψα	[ˈeɣrapsa]	έγραφα	[ˈeɣrafa]
Composite	περιγράφω ← περί + γράφω	[peɾiˈɣrafo]	describe	περιέγραψα	[peɾiˈeɣrapsa]	περιέγραφα	[peɾiˈeɣrafa]
Composite	υπογράφω ← υπό + γράφω	[ipoˈɣrafo]	sign	υπέγραψα	[iˈpeɣrapsa]	υπέγραφα	[iˈpeɣrafa]
Composite	διαγράφω ← δια + γράφω	[ðiaˈɣrafo]	delete	διέγραψα	[ðiˈeɣrapsa]	διέγραφα	[ðiˈeɣrafa]
Initial vowel	ελπίζω	[elˈpizo]	hope	ήλπισα	[ˈilpisa]	ήλπιζα	[ˈilpiza]
Composite and initial vowel	υπάρχω ← υπό + άρχω	[iˈparxo]	exist	υπήρξα	[iˈpirksa]	υπήρχα	[iˈpirxa]
Irregular augment	είμαι	[ˈime]	be	——	——	ήμουν	[ˈimun]
Irregular augment	έχω	[ˈexo]	have	——	——	είχα	[ˈixa]
Irregular augment	θέλω	[ˈθelo]	want	θέλησα (no augment)	[ˈθelisa]	ήθελα	[ˈiθela]
Irregular augment	ξέρω	[ˈksero]	know	——	——	ήξερα	[ˈiksera]
Irregular augment	πίνω	[ˈpino]	drink	ήπια	[ˈipça]	έπινα	[ˈepina]

=== Grammatical voice ===
Greek is one of the few modern Indo-European languages that still retain a morphological contrast between the two inherited Proto-Indo-European grammatical voices: active and mediopassive. The mediopassive has several functions:

- Passive function, denoting an action that is performed on the subject by another agent (for example, σκοτώθηκε 'he was killed');
- Reflexive function, denoting an action performed by the subject on him-/herself (for example, ξυρίστηκε 'he shaved himself');
- Reciprocal function, denoting an action performed by several subjects on each other (for example, αγαπιούνται 'they love each other');
- Modal function, denoting the possibility of an action (for example, τρώγεται 'it is edible');
- Deponential function: verbs that occur only in the mediopassive and lack a corresponding active form. They often have meanings that are rendered as active in other languages: εργάζομαι 'Ι work'; κοιμάμαι 'I sleep'; δέχομαι 'I accept'. There are also many verbs that have both an active and a mediopassive form but where the mediopassive has a special function that may be rendered with a separate verb in other languages: for example, active σηκώνω 'I raise', passive σηκώνομαι 'I get up'; active βαράω 'I strike', passive βαριέμαι 'I am bored'.

	γράφω 'write'		αγαπώ 'love'		οδηγώ 'lead'	
	Present	Imperfect	Present	Imperfect	Present	Imperfect
1 sg.	γράφομαι	γραφόμουν	αγαπιέμαι	αγαπιόμουν*	οδηγούμαι	οδηγούμουν
2 sg.	γράφεσαι	γραφόσουν	αγαπιέσαι	αγαπιόσουν	οδηγείσαι	οδηγούσουν
3 sg.	γράφεται	γραφόταν(ε)	αγαπιέται	αγαπιόταν(ε)	οδηγείται	οδηγούνταν(ε)
1 pl.	γραφόμαστε	γραφόμασταν	αγαπιόμαστε	αγαπιόμασταν	οδηγούμαστε	οδηγούμασταν
2 pl.	γράφεστε	γραφόσασταν	αγαπιέστε	αγαπιόσασταν	οδηγείστε	οδηγούσασταν
3 pl.	γράφονται	γράφονταν	αγαπιούνται	αγαπιόνταν	οδηγούνται	οδηγούνταν
	Pres. perfective (subj.)	Aorist	Pres. perfective (subj.)	Aorist	Pres. perfective (subj.)	Aorist
1 sg.	γραφτώ	γράφτηκα	αγαπηθώ	αγαπήθηκα	οδηγηθώ	οδηγήθηκα
2 sg.	γραφτείς	γράφτηκες	αγαπηθείς	αγαπήθηκες	οδηγηθείς	οδηγήθηκες
3 sg.	γραφτεί	γράφτηκε	αγαπηθεί	αγαπήθηκε	οδηγηθεί	οδηγήθηκε
1 pl.	γραφτούμε	γραφτήκαμε	αγαπηθούμε	αγαπηθήκαμε	οδηγηθούμε	οδηγηθήκαμε
2 pl.	γραφτείτε	γραφτήκατε	αγαπηθείτε	αγαπηθήκατε	οδηγηθείτε	οδηγηθήκατε
3 pl.	γραφτούν	γράφτηκαν	αγαπηθούν	αγαπήθηκαν	οδηγηθούν	οδηγήθηκαν

There also two other categories of verbs, which historically correspond to the ancient contracted verbs.

	εγγυώμαι ('guarantee')			στερούμαι ('lack')		
	Present	Imperfect	Imperative	Present	Imperfect	Imperative
Impf.	εγγυώμαι εγγυάσαι εγγυάται εγγυόμαστε εγγυάστε εγγυώνται	εγγυόμουν εγγυόσουν εγγυόταν εγγυόμασταν εγγυόσασταν εγγυόνταν	— —	στερούμαι στερείσαι στερείται στερούμαστε στερείστε στερούνται	στερούμουν στερούσουν στερούνταν and στερείτο στερούμασταν στερούσασταν στερούνταν	— —
	Subjunctive	Aorist	Imperative	Subjunctive	Aorist	Imperative
Pf.	εγγυηθώ εγγυηθείς εγγυηθεί εγγυηθούμε εγγυηθείτε εγγυηθούν	εγγυήθηκα εγγυήθηκες εγγυήθηκε εγγυηθήκαμε εγγυηθήκατε εγγυήθηκαν	εγγυήσου εγγυηθείτε	στερηθώ στερηθείς στερηθεί στερηθούμε στερηθείτε στερηθούν (στερηθούνε)	στερήθηκα στερήθηκες στερήθηκε στερηθήκαμε στερηθήκατε στερήθηκαν (στερηθήκανε)	στερήσου στερηθείτε
	έχω εγγυηθεί			έχω στερηθεί		

- There are also more formal suffixes instead of -μασταν, -σασταν: -μαστε, -σαστε. In this case the suffixes of the first person of the plural of present and imperfect are the same.

=== Be and have ===
The verbs είμαι ('be') and έχω ('have') are irregular and defective, because they both lack the aspectual contrast. The forms of both are given below. The first and second person plural forms ήμαστε and ήσαστε appear very rarely in the spoken language.

For both of these verbs, the older declinable participles are also sometimes used in fossilized stereotypical expressions (e.g. "έχων σωάς τας φρένας", 'of sound mind and spirit')

Present	Past	Participle
είμαι είσαι είναι είμαστε είσαστε/είστε είναι	ήμουν(α) ήσουν(α) ήταν(ε) ήμασταν/ήμαστε ήσασταν/ήσαστε ήταν(ε)	όντας

Present	Past	Participle
έχω έχεις έχει έχουμε έχετε έχουν(ε)	είχα είχες είχε είχαμε είχατε είχαν(ε)	έχοντας

== Nouns ==
The Greek nominal system displays inflection for two numbers (singular and plural), three genders (masculine, feminine and neuter), and four cases (nominative, genitive, accusative and vocative). As in many other Indo-European languages, the distribution of grammatical gender across nouns is largely arbitrary and need not coincide with natural sex. Case, number and gender are marked on the noun as well as on articles and adjectives modifying it. While there are four cases, there is a great degree of syncretism between case forms within most paradigms. Only one sub-group of the masculine nouns actually has four distinct forms in the four cases.

=== Articles ===
There are two articles in Modern Greek, the definite and the indefinite. They are both inflected for gender and case, and the definite article also for number. The article agrees with the noun it modifies. For plural indefiniteness, no article is used.

==== Definite article ====
The definite article is used frequently in Greek, such as before nouns used in an abstract sense and proper names. For example,

- Ο Αλέξανδρος ήρθε χθες (O Alexandros irthe chthes, "Alexander came yesterday")
- Η ειλικρίνεια είναι η καλύτερη πρακτική. (I eilikrineia einai i kalyteri praktiki, "Honesty is the best policy")

		Neuter	Masculine	Feminine
Singular	Nominative	το	ο	η
Singular	Accusative	το	τον	τη(ν)
Singular	Genitive	του		της
Plural	Nominative	τα	οι	
Plural	Accusative	τα	τους	τις
Plural	Genitive	των		

==== Indefinite article ====
The indefinite article is identical with the numeral one and only has singular forms. The use of the indefinite article is not dictated by rules and the speaker can use it according to the circumstances of their speech. Indefiniteness in plural nouns is expressed by the bare noun without an article, just as in English. For example,

- Αγόρασα έναν υπολογιστή (Agorasa enan ypologisti, "I bought a computer")

However, the indefinite article is not used in Greek as often as in English because it specifically expresses the concept of "one". For example,

- Είναι δικηγόρος (Einai dikigoros, "He is a lawyer")
- Τι καλό παιδί! (Ti kalo paidi, "What a good boy!")

	Singular					
	Masculine		Feminine		Neuter	
Nominative	ένας	[ˈenas]	μία or μια	[ˈmia] or [mɲa]	ένα	[ˈena]
Accusative	έναν	[ˈenan]	μία(ν) or μια(ν) (Note: In these cases, the final -ν (-n) is omitted before words that begin with a consonant except when this consonant is a voiceless stop κ [k], π [p] and τ [t], a double consonant ξ [ks] or ψ [ps] and one of the consonant clusters μπ [b], ντ [d], γκ [g], τσ [ts] and τζ [dz].)	[ˈmia(n)] or [mɲa(n)]	ένα	[ˈena]
Genitive	ενός	[eˈnos]	μίας or μιας	[ˈmias] or [mɲas]	ενός	[eˈnos]

=== Declensions ===
Greek nouns are inflected by case and number. In addition each noun belongs to one of three genders: masculine, feminine and neuter. Within each of the three genders, there are several sub-groups (declension classes) with different sets of inflectional endings.

==== Masculine nouns ====
The main groups of masculine nouns have the nominative singular end in -ος [-os], -ης [-is], -ας [-as], -έας [-ˈeas]. Nouns in -os are identical to the Ancient Greek second declension, except for the final -n of the accusative singular. However, in other parts of speech that follow the same declension and where clarity is necessary, such as in pronouns, the -n is added. When the word has more than two syllables and the antepenult is accented, the accent fluctuates between the antepenult and the penult according to whether the last syllable has one of the ancient long diphthongs, -ου, -ων or -ους. Nouns in -is correspond to the ancient first declension in most cases, having the accent on the ultimate syllable in the genitive plural, and so do some nouns ending in -ίας [-ˈias]. Nouns in -as stem from the ancient third declension. They formed their nominative singular from the accusative singular and retain the original accent in genitive plural. Nouns in -eas stem from the ancient third declension and form their plural respectively.

Moreover, there are other categories and forms too that have to do with either Demotic or Katharevousa. For example, through Demotic, many nouns, especially oxytones (those that are accented on the last syllable) in -άς (-as) or -ής (-is) form their plural by adding the stem extension -άδ- (-ad-) and -ήδ- (-id-) respectively. Although this declension group is an element of Demotic, it has its roots in Ionic Greek that influenced later Koine. On the other hand, from Katharevousa, nouns such as μυς (mys, "muscle") follow the ancient declension in all cases except for the dative.

		-ος/-οι άνθρωπος ([ˈanθropos] 'human')		-ης/-ες πολίτης ([poˈlitis] 'citizen')		-ας/-ες πατέρας ([paˈteras] 'father')		-εας/-εις προβολέας ([provoˈleas] 'floodlight')		-ας/-αδες ψαράς ([psaˈras] 'fisherman')	
Singular	Nominative Genitive Accusative Vocative	άνθρωπος ανθρώπου άνθρωπο άνθρωπε	[-os] [-u] [-o] [-e]	πολίτης πολίτη πολίτη πολίτη	[-is] [-i] [-i] [-i]	πατέρας πατέρα πατέρα πατέρα	[-as] [-a] [-a] [-a]	προβολέας προβολέα προβολέα προβολέα	[-eas] [-ea] [-ea] [-ea]	ψαράς ψαρά ψαρά ψαρά	[-as] [-a] [-a] [-a]
Plural	Nominative Genitive Accusative	άνθρωποι ανθρώπων ανθρώπους	[-i] [-on] [-us]	πολίτες πολιτών πολίτες	[-es] [-ˈon] [-es]	πατέρες πατέρων πατέρες	[-es] [-on] [-es]	προβολείς προβολέων προβολείς	[-is] [-eon] [-is]	ψαράδες ψαράδων ψαράδες	[-aðes] [-aðon] [-aðes]

==== Feminine nouns ====
Most feminine nouns end in -η [-i], -α [-a] and -ος [-os]. Those that end in -i and many that end in -a stem from the ancient first declension and have the accent on the ultimate syllable in genitive plural. The rest of those that end in -a originate from the ancient third declension and have formed their nominative singular from the ancient accusative singular; those nouns keep the accent unchanged in genitive plural. The nouns that end in -ος (-os) are identical to the respective masculine nouns. Finally, many feminine nouns that end in -η (-i) correspond to Ancient Greek nouns in -ις (-is), which are still used as learned forms in formal contexts. Their singular forms have been adapted to the rest of the feminine nouns, while their plural forms have retained the ancient pattern in -εις (-eis). The forms of the genitive singular -εως (-eos) are also found as a stylistic variant and they are fully acceptable, and in fact are more commonly used than the old-style nominative singular form.

		-η/-ες μάχη ([ˈmaçi], 'battle')		-α/-ες θάλασσα ([ˈθalasa], 'sea')		-ος/-οι μέθοδος ([ˈmeθoðos], 'method')		-η/-εις δύναμη ([ˈðinami], 'force')	
Singular	Nominative Genitive Accusative Vocative	μάχη μάχης μάχη μάχη	[-i] [-is] [-i] [-i]	θάλασσα θάλασσας θάλασσα θάλασσα	[-a] [-as] [-a] [-a]	μέθοδος μεθόδου μέθοδο μέθοδε	[-os] [-u] [-o] [-e]	δύναμη δύναμης and δυνάμεως δύναμη δύναμη	[-i] [-is] and [-eos] [-i] [-i]
Plural	Nominative Genitive Accusative	μάχες μαχών μάχες	[-es] [-ˈon] [-es]	θάλασσες θαλασσών θάλασσες	[-es] [-ˈon] [-es]	μέθοδοι μεθόδων μεθόδους	[-i] [-on] [-us]	δυνάμεις δυνάμεων δυνάμεις	[-is] [-eon] [-is]

==== Neuter nouns ====
Most neuter nouns end either in -ο [-o] (plural: -α [-a]) or -ι [-i] (plural: -ιά [-ia]). Indeed, most of them that end in -i initially ended in -io, an ending for diminutives that many nouns had acquired already from Koine Greek. As a result, the endings of the plural and of the genitive singular are reminiscent of those older forms. For example, the diminutive of the ancient Greek word παῖς (pais, "child") is παιδίον (paidion) and hence the modern noun παιδί (paidi). Other neuter nouns end in -α (-a) and -ος (-os) and their declension is similar to the ancient one. Moreover, some nouns in -ιμο (-imo), which are usually derivatives of verbs, are declined similarly to those that end in -a. Also note that most borrowings are indeclinable neuter, and can have just about any ending, such as γουίντ-σέρφινγκ "windsurfing". Finally, all neuter nouns have identical forms across the nominative, accusative and vocative.

		-ο/-α βιβλίο ([viˈvlio], 'book')		-ί/-ιά παιδί ([peˈði], 'child')		-α/-ατα πρόβλημα ([ˈprovlima], 'problem')		-ος/-η μέγεθος ([ˈmeʝeθos], 'size')		-ιμο/-ίματα δέσιμο ([ˈðesimo], 'tying')	
Singular	Nominative Genitive Accusative	βιβλίο βιβλίου βιβλίο	[-o] [-u] [-o]	παιδί παιδιού παιδί	[-i] [-ˈju] [-i]	πρόβλημα προβλήματος πρόβλημα	[-a] [-atos] [-a]	μέγεθος μεγέθους μέγεθος	[-os] [-us] [-os]	δέσιμο δεσίματος δέσιμο	[-o] [-atos] [-o]
Plural	Nominative Genitive Accusative	βιβλία βιβλίων βιβλία	[-a] [-on] [-a]	παιδιά παιδιών παιδιά	[-ˈja] [-ˈjon] [-ˈja]	προβλήματα προβλημάτων προβλήματα	[-ata] [-ˈaton] [-ata]	μεγέθη μεγεθών μεγέθη	[-i] [-ˈon] [-i]	δεσίματα δεσιμάτων δεσίματα	[-ata] [-ˈaton] [-ata]

For other neuter nouns, the ancient declension is used. For example, το φως (fos, "light") becomes του φωτός, τα φώτα and των φώτων and το οξύ (oxy, "acid") becomes του οξέος, τα οξέα and των οξέων.

== Adjectives ==
Adjectives agree with nouns in gender, case and number. Therefore, each adjective has a threefold declension paradigm for the three genders. Adjectives show agreement both when they are used as attributes, e.g. η όμορφη γυναίκα (i omorfi gynaika, "the beautiful woman") and when they are used as predicates e.g. η γυναίκα είναι όμορφη (i gynaika einai omorfi, "the woman is beautiful").

Most adjectives take forms in -ος (-os) in the masculine, -ο (-o) in the neuter and either -η (-i), -α (-a) or -ια (-ia) in the feminine. All those adjectives are declined similarly with the nouns that have the same endings. However they keep the accent stable where nouns change it. Adjectives with a consonant before the ending usually form the feminine with -η, those with a vowel before the ending in -α and some adjectives that end in -κός ([-ˈkos], -kos) or -χός ([-ˈxos], -chos) usually form it in -ια although the ending -η is applicable for those too.

			Masculine	Feminine	Neuter
Singular	Nominative	όμορφος ([ˈomorfos], "beautiful")	όμορφος	όμορφη	όμορφο
Singular	Nominative	νέος ([ˈneos], "new, young")	νέος	νέα	νέο
Singular	Nominative	γλυκός ([ɣliˈkos], "sweet")	γλυκός	γλυκιά	γλυκό

		Masculine		Feminine						Neuter	
		Masculine		for όμορφος		for νέος		for γλυκός		Neuter	
Singular	Nominative Genitive Accusative Vocative	όμορφος όμορφου όμορφο όμορφε	[-os] [-u] [-o] [-e]	όμορφη όμορφης όμορφη όμορφη	[-i] [-is] [-i] [-i]	νέα νέας νέα νέα	[-a] [-as] [-a] [-a]	γλυκιά γλυκιάς γλυκιά γλυκιά	[-ja] [-jas] [-ja] [-ja]	όμορφο όμορφου όμορφο όμορφο	[-o] [-u] [-o] [-o]
Plural	Nominative Genitive Accusative Vocative	όμορφοι όμορφων όμορφους όμορφοι	[-i] [-on] [-us] [-i]	όμορφες όμορφων όμορφες όμορφες	[-es] [-on] [-es] [-es]	νέες νέων νέες νέες	[-es] [-on] [-es] [-es]	γλυκές γλυκών γλυκές γλυκές	[-es] [-on] [-es] [-es]	όμορφα όμορφων όμορφα όμορφα	[-a] [-on] [-a] [-a]

Other classes of adjectives include those that take forms in -ης (-is) in both masculine and feminine and in -ες (-es) in neuter. They are declined similarly with the ancient declension. Those that are not accented on the ultima usually raise the accent in the neuter. Another group includes adjectives that end in -υς ([-is], -ys). Although some are declined somewhat archaically such as οξύς (oxys, "acute"), most of them are declined according to the rules of Demotic Greek and in many cases and persons they acquire other endings, such as in the case of πλατύς (platys, "wide").

		-ης, -ες/-εις, -η συνεχής ([sineˈçis], 'continuous')				-υς, -ια, -υ/-ιοι, -ιες, -ια πλατύς ([plaˈtis], 'wide')						-υς, -εια, -υ/-εις, -ειες, -εα οξύς ([oˈksis], 'acute')					
		Masc. & Fem.		Neuter		Masculine		Feminine		Neuter		Masculine		Feminine		Neuter	
Singular	Nominative Genitive Accusative Vocative	συνεχής συνεχούς συνεχή συνεχή	[-is] [-us] [-i] [-i]	συνεχές συνεχούς συνεχές συνεχές	[-es] [-us] [-es] [-es]	πλατύς πλατιού πλατύ πλατύ	[-is] [-ju] [-i] [-i]	πλατιά πλατιάς πλατιά πλατιά	[-ja] [-jas] [-ja] [-ja]	πλατύ πλατιού πλατύ πλατύ	[-i] [-ju] [-i] [-i]	οξύς οξέος οξύ οξύ	[-is] [-eos] [-i] [-i]	οξεία οξείας οξεία οξεία	[-ia] [-ias] [-ia] [-ia]	οξύ οξέος οξύ οξύ	[-i] [-eos] [-i] [-i]
Plural	Nominative Genitive Accusative Vocative	συνεχείς συνεχών συνεχείς συνεχείς	[-is] [-on] [-is] [-is]	συνεχή συνεχών συνεχή συνεχή	[-i] [-on] [-i] [-i]	πλατιοί πλατιών πλατιούς πλατιοί	[-ji] [-jon] [-jus] [-ji]	πλατιές πλατιών πλατιές πλατιές	[-jes] [-jon] [-jes] [-jes]	πλατιά πλατιών πλατιά πλατιά	[-ja] [-jon] [-ja] [-ja]	οξείς οξέων οξείς οξείς	[-is] [-eon] [-is] [-is]	οξείες οξειών οξείες οξείες	[-ies] [-ion] [-ies] [-ies]	οξέα οξέων οξέα οξέα	[-ea] [-eon] [-ea] [-ea]

The adjective πολύς (polys, "many, much") is irregular:

		Masculine		Feminine		Neuter	
Singular	Nominative Genitive Accusative Vocative	πολύς πολύ or πολλού πολύ πολύ	[-is] [-i] or [-u] [-i] [-i]	πολλή πολλής πολλή πολλή	[-i] [-is] [-i] [-i]	πολύ πολύ or πολλού πολύ πολύ	[-i] [-i] or [-u] [-i] [-i]
Plural	Nominative Genitive Accusative Vocative	πολλοί πολλών πολλούς πολλοί	[-i] [-on] [-us] [-i]	πολλές πολλών πολλές πολλές	[-es] [-on] [-es] [-es]	πολλά πολλών πολλά πολλά	[-a] [-on] [-a] [-a]

=== Comparative and superlative ===
Adjectives in Modern Greek can form a comparative for expressing comparisons. Similar to English, it can be formed in two ways, as a periphrastic form (as in English pos beautiful, comp more beautiful) and as a synthetic form using suffixes, as in English adj tall comp tall-er. The periphrastic comparative is formed by the particle πιο ([pço], pio, originally "more") preceding the adjective. The synthetic forms of the regular adjectives in -ος, -η and -o is created with the suffix -ότερος (-'oteros), -ότερη (-'oteri) and -ότερο (-'otero). For those adjectives that end in -ης and -ες or -υς, -εια and -υ the corresponding suffixes are -έστερος (-'esteros) etc. and -ύτερος (-'yteros) etc. respectively.

A superlative is expressed by combining the comparative, in either its periphrastic or synthetic form, with a preceding definite article. Thus, Modern Greek does not distinguish between the largest house and the larger house; both are το μεγαλύτερο σπίτι.

Besides the superlative proper, sometimes called "relative superlative", there is also an "absolute superlative" or elative, expressing the meaning "very...", for example ωραιότατος means very beautiful. Elatives are formed with the suffixes -ότατος, -ότατη and -ότατο for the regular adjectives, -έστατος etc. for those in -ης and -ύτατος for those in -υς.

Simple form			Comparative form		Superlative form		
Simple form			Comparative form		Relative		Absolute (elative)
Simple form			Periphrastic	Synthetic	Periphrastic	Synthetic	Absolute (elative)
Adjectives	ωραίος	nice	πιο ωραίος	ωραιότερος	ο πιο ωραίος	ο ωραιότερος	ωραιότατος
Adjectives	βαθύς	deep	πιο βαθύς	βαθύτερος	ο πιο βαθύς	ο βαθύτερος	βαθύτατος
Adjectives	επιεικής	lenient	πιο επιεικής	επιεικέστερος	ο πιο επιεικής	ο επιεικέστερος	επιεικέστατος
Participles	μεθυσμένος	drunk	πιο μεθυσμένος	—	ο πιο μεθυσμένος	—	—
Adverbs	ωραία	nicely	πιο ωραία	ωραιότερα	—	—	ωραιότατα
Adverbs	επιεικώς	leniently	πιο επιεικώς	επιεικέστερα	—	—	επιεικέστατα

== Numerals ==
The numerals one, three and four are declined irregularly. Other numerals such as διακόσιοι (diakosioi, "two hundred"), τριακόσιοι (triakosioi, "three hundred") etc. and χίλιοι (chilioi, "thousand") are declined regularly like adjectives. Other numerals including two are not declined.

	Singular						Plural							
	ένας (enas, "one")						τρεις (treis, "three")				τέσσερις (tesseris, "four")			
	Masculine		Feminine		Neuter		Masc. & Fem.		Neuter		Masc. & Fem.		Neuter	
Nominative	ένας	[ˈenas]	μία	[ˈmia]	ένα	[ˈena]	τρεις	[tris]	τρία	[ˈtria]	τέσσερις	[ˈteseris]	τέσσερα	[ˈtesera]
Genitive	ενός	[eˈnos]	μιας	[mɲas]	ενός	[eˈnos]	τριών	[triˈon]	τριών	[triˈon]	τεσσάρων	[teˈsaron]	τεσσάρων	[teˈsaron]
Accusative	έναν	[ˈenan]	μία(ν)	[ˈmia(n)]	ένα	[ˈena]	τρεις	[tris]	τρία	[ˈtria]	τέσσερις	[ˈteseris]	τέσσερα	[ˈtesera]

== Pronouns ==
Greek pronouns include personal pronouns, reflexive pronouns, demonstrative pronouns, interrogative pronouns, possessive pronouns, intensive pronouns, relative pronouns, and indefinite pronouns.

=== Personal pronouns ===
There are strong personal pronouns (stressed, free) and weak personal pronouns (unstressed, clitic). Nominative pronouns only have the strong form (except in some minor environments) and are used as subjects only when special emphasis is intended, since unstressed subjects recoverable from context are not overtly expressed anyway. Genitive (possessive) pronouns are used in their weak forms as pre-verbal clitics to express indirect objects (for example, του μίλησα, [tu ˈmilisa], 'I talked to him'), and as a post-nominal clitic to express possession (for example, οι φίλοι του, [i ˈfili tu], 'his friends'). The strong genitive forms are relatively rare and used only for special emphasis (for example, αυτού οι φίλοι, [afˈtu i ˈfili], 'his friends'); often they are doubled by the weak forms (for example, αυτού του μίλησα, [afˈtu tu ˈmilisa], ' him I talked to'). An alternative way of giving emphasis to a possessive pronoun is propping it up with the stressed adjective δικός ([ðiˈkos], 'own'), for example, οι δικοί του φίλοι ([i ðiˈci tu ˈfili], 'his friends').

Accusative pronouns exist both in a weak and a strong form. The weak form in the oblique cases is used as a pre-verbal clitic (for example, τον είδα, [ton ˈiða], 'I saw him'); the strong form is used elsewhere in the clause (for example, είδα αυτόν, [ˈiða afˈton], 'I saw him'). The weak form in the nominative is found only in few idiomatic deictic expressions, such as να τος 'there he [is]', πού 'ν' τος; 'where is he?'. Third-person pronouns have separate forms for the three genders; those of the first and second person do not. The weak third-person forms are similar to the corresponding forms of the definite article. The strong third-person forms function simultaneously as generic demonstratives ('this, that').

The strong forms of the third person in the genitive (αυτού, αυτής, αυτών, αυτούς) have optional alternative forms extended by an additional syllable [-on-] or [-un-] (αυτουνού, αυτηνής, αυτωνών). In the plural, there exists the alternative accusative form αυτουνούς.

			1st person		2nd person		3rd person					
			1st person		2nd person		Masc.		Fem.		Neut.	
Strong	Singular	Nominative	εγώ	[eˈɣo]	εσύ	[eˈsi]	αυτός	[afˈtos]	αυτή	[afˈti]	αυτό	[afˈto]
Strong	Singular	Genitive	εμένα	[eˈmena]	εσένα	[eˈsena]	αυτoύ	[afˈtu]	αυτής	[afˈtis]	αυτού	[afˈtu]
Strong	Singular	Accusative	εμένα	[eˈmena]	εσένα	[eˈsena]	αυτόν	[afˈton]	αυτήν	[afˈtin]	αυτό	[afˈto]
Strong	Plural	Nominative	εμείς	[eˈmis]	εσείς	[eˈsis]	αυτοί	[afˈti]	αυτές	[afˈtes]	αυτά	[afˈta]
Strong	Plural	Genitive	εμάς	[eˈmas]	εσάς	[eˈsas]	αυτών	[afˈton]	αυτών	[afˈton]	αυτών	[afˈton]
Strong	Plural	Accusative	εμάς	[eˈmas]	εσάς	[eˈsas]	αυτούς	[afˈtus]	αυτές	[afˈtes]	αυτά	[afˈta]
Weak	Singular	Nominative					(τος)	[tos]	(τη)	[ti]	(το)	[to]
Weak	Singular	Genitive	μου	[mu]	σου	[su]	του	[tu]	της	[tis]	του	[tu]
Weak	Singular	Accusative	με	[me]	σε	[se]	τον	[ton]	την	[tin]	το	[to]
Weak	Plural	Nominative					(τοι)	[ti]	(τες)	[tes]	(τα)	[ta]
Weak	Plural	Genitive	μας	[mas]	σας	[sas]	τους	[tus]	τους	[tus]	τους	[tus]
Weak	Plural	Accusative	μας	[mas]	σας	[sas]	τους	[tus]	τις/τες	[tis]/[tes]	τα	[ta]

Besides αυτός [afˈtos] as a generic demonstrative, there are also the more specific spatial demonstrative pronouns τούτος, -η, -ο ([ˈtutos], 'this here') and εκείνος, -η, -ο ([eˈcinos], 'that there').

It is worth noting that in some rare cases, pronouns in the genitive can either express an indirect object or a possessive, as they have the same form (μου, σου, του, ...). In the case of possible ambiguity, a diacritical accent should be written if the pronoun is an indirect object (μού, σού, τού, ...).

- Indirect object: Ο καθηγητής μού εξήγησε το μάθημα. (The teacher explained the lesson to me.)

- Possessive: Ο καθηγητής μου εξήγησε το μάθημα. (My teacher explained the lesson.)

- Both: Ο καθηγητής μου μου εξήγησε το μάθημα. (My teacher explained the lesson to me.)

The last sentence does not require diacritics, as one of the "μου" represents the possessive, and the other one represents the indirect object.

In speech, the ambiguity would be removed by a stronger emphasis of 'μου' if it is an indirect object, the possessive being unstressed anyway.

== Prepositions ==
In Demotic Greek, prepositions normally require the accusative case: από (from), για (for), με (with), μετά (after), χωρίς (without), ως (as) and σε (to, in or at). The preposition σε, when followed by a definite article, fuses with it into forms like στο (σε + το) and στη (σε + τη). While there is only a relatively small number of simple prepositions native to Demotic, the two most basic prepositions σε and από can enter into a large number of combinations with preceding adverbs to form new compound prepositions, for example, πάνω σε (on), κάτω από (underneath), πλάι σε (beside), πάνω από (over) etc.

A few prepositions that take cases other than the accusative have been borrowed into Standard Modern Greek from the learned tradition of Katharevousa: κατά (against), υπέρ (in favor of, for), αντί (instead of). Other prepositions live on in a fossilised form in certain fixed expressions (for example, εν τω μεταξύ 'in the meantime', dative).

The preposition από (apó, 'from') is also used to express the agent in passive sentences, like English by.

== Conjunctions ==
Coordinating and subordinating conjunctions in Greek include:

Kinds	Conjunctions	Meaning
Copulative	και (κι), ούτε, μήτε, ουδέ, μηδέ, μεν... δε	and, neither
Disjunctive	ή, είτε	or, either
Adversative	μα, αλλά, παρά, όμως, ωστόσο, ενώ, αν και, μολονότι, μόνο, μόλο	but, although, however, whereas
Inferential	λοιπόν, ώστε, άρα, επομένως, που	so, so as, thus, that
Explanatory	δηλαδή	so, in other words
Complementizers	ότι, πως, που	that
Temporal	όταν, σαν, ενώ, καθώς, αφού, αφότου, πριν (πριν να), μόλις, προτού, ώσπου, ωσότου, όσο που, όποτε	when, while, after, before, just, until
Causal	γιατί, διότι, επειδή, αφού	because
Conditional	αν, εάν, άμα, σαν	if
Purpose	να, για να	so as, (in order) to
Result	ώστε (να), που	so as, (in order) to
Concessive	μολονότι	despite
Dubitative	μη(ν), μήπως	maybe, perhaps
Comparative	παρά	to, than

The word να ([na]) serves as a generic subordinator corresponding roughly to English to (+ infinitive) or that in sentences like προτιμώ να πάω ([protiˈmo na ˈpao], 'I prefer to go', literally 'I prefer that I go') or προτιμώ να πάει ο Γιάννης ([protiˈmo na ˈpai o ˈʝannis], 'I prefer that John go'). It marks the following verb as being in the subjunctive mood. Somewhat similar to the English to-infinitive its use is often associated with meanings of non-factuality, i.e. events that have not (yet) come true, that are expected, wished for etc. In this, it contrasts with ότι [ˈoti] and πως [pos], which correspond to English that when used with a meaning of factuality. The difference can be seen in the contrast between μας είπε να πάμε βόλτα ([mas ˈipe na ˈpame ˈvolta], 'he told us to go for a walk') vs. μας είπε πως πήγε βόλτα ([mas ˈipe pos ˈpiʝe ˈvolta], 'he told us that he went for a walk'). When used on its own with a following verb, να may express a wish or order, as in να πάει! ([na ˈpai], 'let him go' or 'may he go'). Unlike the other subordinating conjunctions, να is always immediately followed by the verb it governs, separated from it only by any clitics that might be attached to the verb, but not by a subject or other clause-initial material.

== Negation ==
For sentence negation, Greek has two distinct negation particles, δε(ν) ([ˈðe(n)], de(n)) and μη(ν) ([ˈmi(n)], mi(n)). Δεν is used in clauses with indicative mood, while μην is used primarily in subjunctive contexts, either after subjunctive-inducing να or as a negative replacement for να. Both particles are syntactically part of the proclitic group in front of the verb, and can be separated from the verb only by intervening clitic pronouns. The distinction between δεν and μην is a particularly archaic feature in Greek, continuing an old prohibitive negation marker inherited from Indo-European. As such, μην is often associated with the expression of a wish for an event not to come true:

- Δεν του ζήτησα να έρθει. (Den tou zitisa na erthei, "I didn't ask him to come.")
- Του ζήτησα να μην έρθει. (Tou zitisa na min erthei, "I asked him not to come.")

When used alone with a subjunctive verb in the second person, prohibitive μην serves as the functional equivalent to a negative imperative, which itself cannot be negated. Thus, the negation of the positive imperative τρέξε ([ˈtrekse], 'run!') is μην τρέξεις ([min ˈtreksis], 'don't run!').

The particle όχι serves as the stand-alone utterance of negation ('no'), and also for negation of elliptical, verbless sentences and for contrastive negation of individual constituents:

- Κάλεσα τη Μαρία, όχι τον Γιώργο. (Kalesa ti Maria, ochi ton Giorgo, "I invited Mary, not George.")

For constituent negation, Greek employs negative concord. The negated constituent is marked with a negative-polarity item (e.g. κανένας 'any, anybody/nobody', τίποτα 'anything/nothing', πουθενά 'anywhere/nowhere'), and the verb is additionally marked with the sentence negator δεν (or μην). In verbless, elliptical contexts the negative-polarity items can also serve to express negation alone.

	Masculine		Feminine		Neuter	
Nominative Genitive Accusative	κανένας or κανείς κανενός κανέναν	[-enas] or [-is] [-enos] [-enan]	καμία καμίας καμία	[-mia] [-mias] [-mia]	κανένα κανενός κανένα	[-ena] [-enos] [-ena]

The negative pronoun κανείς ([kaˈnis], kaneis), i.e. nobody or anybody is declined in all three genders and three cases and can be used as the English determiner no.

- Δε θέλω κανέναν εδώ. (De thelo kanenan edo, "I want nobody here.")
- —Είναι κανείς εδώ; —Όχι, κανείς. (—Einai kaneis edo? —Ochi, kaneis, "'Is anyone here?' 'No, nobody.'")
- Δεν έκανα κανένα λάθος. (Den ekana kanena lathos, "I have made no mistake.")

On the other hand, the negative pronoun ουδείς ([uˈðis], oudeis), from the learned tradition of Ancient Greek, is used without negative concord:

- Ουδείς πείστηκε. (Oudeis peistike, "No one was convinced.")

	Masculine		Feminine		Neuter	
Nominative Genitive Accusative	ουδείς ουδενός ουδένα	[-is] [-enos] [-ena]	ουδεμία ουδεμίας ουδεμία(ν)	[-mia] [-mias] [-mia(n)]	ουδέν ουδενός ουδέν	[-en] [-enos] [-en]

== Relative clauses ==
Greek has two different ways of forming relative clauses. The simpler and by far the more frequent uses the invariable relativizer που ([pu], 'that', literally 'where'), as in: η γυναίκα που είδα χτες ([i ʝiˈneka pu ˈiða xtes], 'the woman that I saw yesterday'). When the relativized element is a subject, object or adverbial within the relative clause, then – as in English – it has no other overt expression within the relative clause apart from the relativizer. Some other types of relativized elements, however, such as possessors, are represented within the clause by a resumptive pronoun, as in: η γυναίκα που βρήκα την τσάντα της (/i ʝiˈneka pu ˈvrika tin ˈt͡sanda tis/, 'the woman whose handbag I found', literally 'the woman that I found her handbag').

The second and more formal form of relative clauses employs complex inflected relative pronouns. They are composite elements consisting of the definite article and a following pronominal element that is inflected like an adjective: ο οποίος, η οποία, το οποίο ([o oˈpios, i oˈpia, to oˈpio] etc., literally 'the which'). Both elements are inflected for case, number and gender according to the grammatical properties of the relativized item within the relative clause, as in: η γυναίκα την οποία είδα χτες ([i ʝiˈneka tin oˈpia ˈiða xtes], 'the woman whom I saw yesterday'); η γυναίκα της οποίας βρήκα την τσάντα ([i ʝiˈneka tis oˈpias ˈvrika tin ˈt͡sanda], 'the woman whose handbag I found').

== Bibliography ==
- Hardy, D. A. and Doyle, T. A. Greek language and people, BBC Books, 1996. ISBN 0-563-16575-8.
- Holton, David; Mackridge, Peter; Philippaki-Warburton, Irini (1997). Greek: A comprehensive grammar of the modern language. London: Routledge.
- Holton, David; Mackridge, Peter; Philippaki-Warburton, Irini (1998). Grammatiki tis ellinikis glossas. Athens: Pataki. [Greek translation of Holton, Mackridge and Philippaki-Warburton 1997]
- Holton, David; Mackridge, Peter; Philippaki-Warburton, Irini (2004). Greek: An essential grammar of the modern language. London: Routledge. ISBN 0-415-23210-4. [abridged version of Holton, Mackridge and Philippaki-Warburton 1997]
- Joseph, Brian D. (1994). "On weak subjects and pro-drop in Greek". In Philippaki-Warburton, Irini (ed.). Themes in Greek Linguistics (Papers from the First International Conference on Greek Linguistics, Reading, September 1993) (PDF). Amsterdam: Benjamins. pp. 21–32.
- Joseph, Brian D.; Philippaki-Warburton, I. (1987). Modern Greek. Croom Helm. ISBN 0709914520.
- Lindstedt, Jouko (1998). "On the Balkan Linguistic Type". Studia Slavica Finlandensia. 15: 91–101.
- Lindstedt, J. 1999. "On the Nature of Linguistic Balkanisms". Paper read at the Eighth International Congress of the International Association of Southeast European Studies (AIESEE), Bucharest 24–28 August 1999.
- Marineta, D. and Papacheimona, D., Ελληνικά Τώρα, Nostos, 1992. ISBN 960-85137-0-7.
- Pappageotes, G. C. and Emmanuel, P. D., Modern Greek in a Nutshell, Institute for Language Study, Montclair, N.J. 07042, Funk and Wagnalls, New York, 1958; "Vest Pocket Modern Greek", Owlets, 1990, ISBN 0-8050-1510-8, ISBN 0-8489-5106-9.
- Pring, J. T. The Pocket Oxford Greek Dictionary, Oxford University Press, 2000. ISBN 0-19-860327-4.
