= Minister for Foreign Affairs (Australia) =

Australian cabinet position

- Commonwealth Coat of Arms

- Flag of Australia

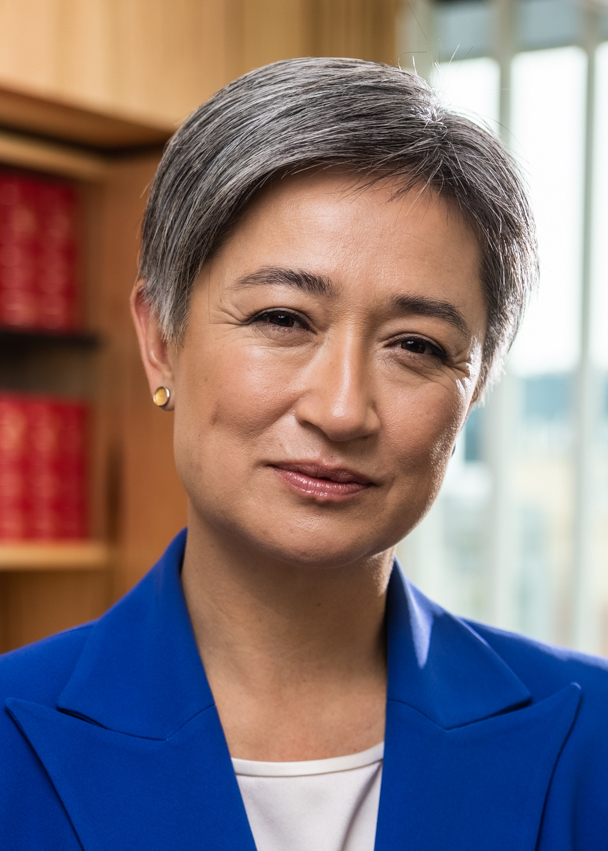
- Incumbent; Penny Wong since 23 May 2022
- Department of Foreign Affairs and Trade
- Style: The Honourable
- Appointer: Governor-General on the advice of the prime minister
- Inaugural holder: Edmund Barton (as Minister for External Affairs)
- Formation: 1 January 1901
- Website: www.foreignminister.gov.au

The minister for foreign affairs, also known as the foreign minister, is the minister of state of the Commonwealth of Australia charged with overseeing the creation and implementation of international diplomacy, relations and foreign affairs policy, as the head of the foreign affairs section of the Department of Foreign Affairs and Trade. The current foreign minister is Senator Penny Wong, who was appointed by Prime Minister Anthony Albanese in May 2022 following the 2022 federal election.

Wong is the first female foreign minister from the Australian Labor Party (ALP) and the third female foreign minister in a row, following Julie Bishop and Marise Payne. The position is one of two cabinet-level portfolio ministers under the Department of Foreign Affairs and Trade, the other being the minister for trade and tourism. The foreign minister is vested with a few subordinate positions, including the minister of international development, currently held by Anne Aly, minister for Pacific Island affairs, currently held by Pat Conroy, and the assistant minister for foreign affairs and trade, currently held by Matt Thistlethwaite.

== Scope ==
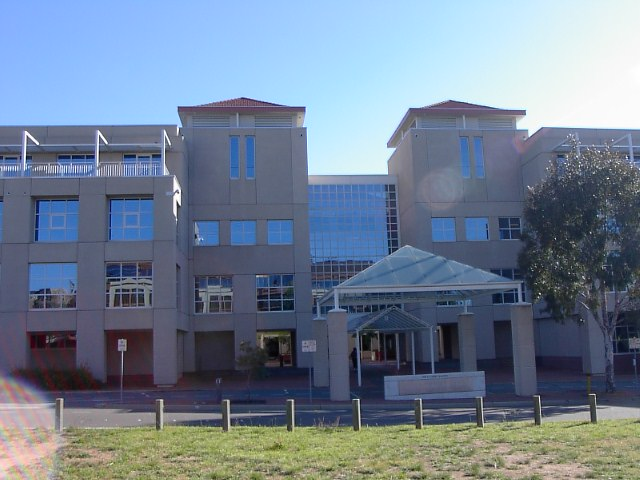
R. G. Casey House, the headquarters of the Department of Foreign Affairs and Trade.

The minister is usually one of the most senior members of Cabinet – the position is equivalent to that of foreign secretary in Britain or secretary of state in the United States – as shown by the fact that eleven prime ministers of Australia have also worked as the minister for foreign affairs. The minister is seen as one of the people most responsible for formulating Australia's foreign policy, as they along with other relevant ministers advise the prime minister in developing and implementing foreign policy, and also acts as the government's main spokesperson on international affairs issues. In recent times, the minister also undertakes numerous international trips to meet with foreign representatives and heads of state or government.

== List of ministers for foreign affairs ==
The portfolio has existed continuously since 1901, except for the period 14 November 1916 to 21 December 1921. Prior to 6 November 1970, the office was known as the minister for external affairs. Between 24 July 1987 and 24 March 1993 it was known as the minister for foreign affairs and trade. Starting with the Keating government, the trade portfolio has been administered separately by the minister for trade.

The following individuals have been appointed as Minister for Foreign Affairs, or any of its precedent titles:

Order	Minister	Party	Prime Minister	Title	Term start	Term end	Term in office
1	Edmund Barton^{1} ^{2}	Protectionist	Barton	Minister for External Affairs	1 January 1901	24 September 1903	2 years, 266 days
2	Alfred Deakin^{1}	Protectionist	Deakin	Minister for External Affairs	24 September 1903	27 April 1904	216 days
3	Billy Hughes	Labor	Watson	Minister for External Affairs	27 April 1904	17 August 1904	112 days
4	George Reid^{1}	Free Trade	Reid	Minister for External Affairs	18 August 1904	5 July 1905	321 days
n/a	Alfred Deakin^{1}	Protectionist	Deakin	Minister for External Affairs	5 July 1905	13 November 1908	3 years, 131 days
5	Lee Batchelor	Labor	Fisher	Minister for External Affairs	13 November 1908	2 June 1909	201 days
6	Littleton Groom	Liberal	Deakin	Minister for External Affairs	2 June 1909	29 April 1910	331 days
n/a	Lee Batchelor	Labor	Fisher	Minister for External Affairs	29 April 1910	8 October 1911	1 year, 162 days
7	Josiah Thomas	Labor	Fisher	Minister for External Affairs	14 October 1911	24 June 1913	1 year, 253 days
8	Paddy Glynn	Liberal	Cook	Minister for External Affairs	24 June 1913	17 September 1914	1 year, 85 days
9	John Arthur	Labor	Fisher	Minister for External Affairs	17 September 1914	9 December 1914	83 days
10	Hugh Mahon	Labor	Fisher	Minister for External Affairs	9 December 1914	27 October 1915	322 days
10	Hugh Mahon	Labor	Hughes	Minister for External Affairs	27 October 1915	14 November 1916	1 year, 18 days
n/a	Billy Hughes^{1}	Nationalist	Hughes	Minister for External Affairs	21 December 1921	9 February 1923	1 year, 50 days
11	Stanley Bruce^{1}	Nationalist	Bruce	Minister for External Affairs	9 February 1923	22 October 1929	6 years, 255 days
12	James Scullin^{1}	Labor	Scullin	Minister for External Affairs	22 October 1929	6 January 1932	2 years, 76 days
13	John Latham	United Australia	Lyons	Minister for External Affairs	6 January 1932	12 October 1934	2 years, 279 days
14	Sir George Pearce	United Australia	Lyons	Minister for External Affairs	12 October 1934	29 November 1937	3 years, 48 days
n/a	Billy Hughes	United Australia	Lyons	Minister for External Affairs	29 November 1937	7 April 1939	1 year, 129 days
n/a	Billy Hughes	United Australia	Page	Minister for External Affairs	7 April 1939	26 April 1939	19 days
15	Sir Henry Somer Gullett	United Australia	Menzies	Minister for External Affairs	26 April 1939	14 March 1940	323 days
16	John McEwen	Country	Menzies	Minister for External Affairs	14 March 1940	28 October 1940	228 days
17	Frederick Stewart	United Australia	Menzies	Minister for External Affairs	28 October 1940	29 August 1941	305 days
17	Frederick Stewart	United Australia	Fadden	Minister for External Affairs	29 August 1941	7 October 1941	39 days
18	H. V. Evatt	Labor	Curtin	Minister for External Affairs	7 October 1941	6 July 1945	8 years, 73 days
18	H. V. Evatt	Labor	Forde	Minister for External Affairs	6 July 1945	13 July 1945	8 years, 73 days
18	H. V. Evatt	Labor	Chifley	Minister for External Affairs	13 July 1945	19 December 1949	8 years, 73 days
19	Percy Spender	Liberal	Menzies	Minister for External Affairs	19 December 1949	26 April 1951	1 year, 128 days
20	Richard Casey	Liberal	Menzies	Minister for External Affairs	27 April 1951	4 February 1960	8 years, 283 days
21	Robert Menzies^{1}	Liberal	Menzies	Minister for External Affairs	4 February 1960	22 December 1961	1 year, 321 days
22	Sir Garfield Barwick	Liberal	Menzies	Minister for External Affairs	22 December 1961	24 April 1964	2 years, 124 days
23	Paul Hasluck	Liberal	Menzies	Minister for External Affairs	24 April 1964	26 January 1966	4 years, 293 days
23	Paul Hasluck	Liberal	Holt	Minister for External Affairs	26 January 1966	19 December 1967	4 years, 293 days
23	Paul Hasluck	Liberal	McEwen	Minister for External Affairs	19 December 1967	10 January 1968	4 years, 293 days
23	Paul Hasluck	Liberal	Gorton	Minister for External Affairs	10 January 1968	11 February 1969	4 years, 293 days
24	Gordon Freeth	Liberal	Gorton	Minister for External Affairs	11 February 1969	12 November 1969	274 days
25	William McMahon	Liberal	Gorton	Minister for External Affairs	12 November 1969	6 November 1970	1 year, 130 days
25	William McMahon	Liberal	Gorton	Minister for Foreign Affairs	6 November 1970	10 March 1971	1 year, 130 days
25	William McMahon	Liberal	McMahon	Minister for Foreign Affairs	10 March 1971	22 March 1971	1 year, 130 days
26	Leslie Bury	Liberal	McMahon	Minister for Foreign Affairs	22 March 1971	2 August 1971	133 days
27	Nigel Bowen	Liberal	McMahon	Minister for Foreign Affairs	2 August 1971	5 December 1972	1 year, 125 days
28	Gough Whitlam^{1}	Labor	Whitlam	Minister for Foreign Affairs	5 December 1972	6 November 1973	336 days
29	Don Willesee	Labor	Whitlam	Minister for Foreign Affairs	6 November 1973	11 November 1975	2 years, 5 days
30	Andrew Peacock	Liberal	Fraser	Minister for Foreign Affairs	12 November 1975	3 November 1980	4 years, 358 days
31	Tony Street	Liberal	Fraser	Minister for Foreign Affairs	3 November 1980	11 March 1983	2 years, 128 days
32	Bill Hayden	Labor	Hawke	Minister for Foreign Affairs	11 March 1983	24 July 1987	5 years, 159 days
32	Bill Hayden	Labor	Hawke	Minister for Foreign Affairs and Trade	24 July 1987	17 August 1988	5 years, 159 days
33	Gareth Evans	Labor	Hawke	Minister for Foreign Affairs and Trade	2 September 1988	20 December 1991	7 years, 191 days
33	Gareth Evans	Labor	Keating	Minister for Foreign Affairs and Trade	20 December 1991	24 March 1993	7 years, 191 days
33	Gareth Evans	Labor	Keating	Minister for Foreign Affairs	24 March 1993	11 March 1996	7 years, 191 days
34	Alexander Downer	Liberal	Howard	Minister for Foreign Affairs	11 March 1996	3 December 2007	11 years, 267 days
35	Stephen Smith	Labor	Rudd	Minister for Foreign Affairs	3 December 2007	24 June 2010	2 years, 285 days
35	Stephen Smith	Labor	Gillard	Minister for Foreign Affairs	24 June 2010	14 September 2010	2 years, 285 days
36	Kevin Rudd	Labor	Gillard	Minister for Foreign Affairs	14 September 2010	22 February 2012	1 year, 161 days
37	Bob Carr	Labor	Gillard	Minister for Foreign Affairs	13 March 2012	27 June 2013	1 year, 189 days
37	Bob Carr	Labor	Rudd	Minister for Foreign Affairs	27 June 2013	18 September 2013	1 year, 189 days
38	Julie Bishop	Liberal	Abbott	Minister for Foreign Affairs	18 September 2013	15 September 2015	4 years, 344 days
38	Julie Bishop	Liberal	Turnbull	Minister for Foreign Affairs	15 September 2015	24 August 2018	4 years, 344 days
38	Julie Bishop	Liberal	Morrison	Minister for Foreign Affairs	24 August 2018	28 August 2018	4 years, 344 days
39	Marise Payne	Liberal	Morrison	Minister for Foreign Affairs	28 August 2018	23 May 2022	3 years, 268 days
40	Penny Wong	Labor	Albanese	Minister for Foreign Affairs	23 May 2022	Incumbent	4 years, 108 days

Notes

^{1} Also served as Prime Minister for some or all of their term.
^{2} Barton was knighted in 1902, while serving as Minister.

== List of ministers for international development ==
The following individuals have been appointed as Minister for International Development, or any precedent title:

Order	Minister	Party	Ministry	Ministerial title	Term start	Term end	Term in office
1	Neal Blewett	Labor	4th Hawke	Minister for Trade and Overseas Development	1 February 1991	20 December 1991	329 days
1	Neal Blewett	Labor	1st Keating	Minister for Trade and Overseas Development	20 December 1991	27 December 1991	329 days
2	John Kerin	Labor	1st Keating	Minister for Trade and Overseas Development	27 December 1991	24 March 1993	1 year, 87 days
3	Gordon Bilney	Labor	2nd Keating	Minister for Development Cooperation and Pacific Island Affairs	24 March 1993	11 March 1996	2 years, 353 days
4	Melissa Parke	Labor	2nd Rudd	Minister for International Development	1 July 2013	18 September 2013	79 days
5	Steven Ciobo	LNP	1st Turnbull	Minister for International Development and the Pacific	21 September 2015	18 February 2016	150 days
6	Concetta Fierravanti-Wells	Liberal	1st Turnbull	Minister for International Development and the Pacific	18 February 2016	19 July 2016	2 years, 185 days
6	Concetta Fierravanti-Wells	Liberal	2nd Turnbull	Minister for International Development and the Pacific	19 July 2016	22 August 2018	2 years, 185 days
7	Alex Hawke	Liberal	2nd Morrison	Minister for International Development and the Pacific	29 May 2019	22 December 2020	1 year, 207 days
8	Zed Seselja	Liberal	2nd Morrison	Minister for International Development and the Pacific	22 December 2020	23 May 2022	1 year, 152 days
9	Pat Conroy	Labor	1st Albanese	Minister for International Development and the Pacific	1 June 2022	13 May 2025	2 years, 346 days
10	Anne Aly	Labor	2nd Albanese	Minister for International Development	13 May 2025	Incumbent	1 year, 117 days

== List of ministers for Pacific Island Affairs ==
In 2025, in the second Albanese ministry, the portfolio of Minister for International Development and the Pacific was split into two: Minister for International Development, held by Anne Aly, and Minister for Pacific Island Affairs, held by Pat Conroy.

The following individuals have been appointed as Minister for Pacific Island Affairs, or any precedent title:

Order	Minister	Party	Ministry	Ministerial title	Term start	Term end	Term in office
1	Bill Morrison	Labor	Whitlam	Minister assisting the Minister for Foreign Affairs in matters relating to Papua New Guinea	30 November 1973	6 June 1975	1 year, 346 days
1	Bill Morrison	Labor	Whitlam	Minister assisting the Minister for Foreign Affairs in matters relating to the Islands of the Pacific	6 June 1975	11 November 1975	1 year, 346 days
2	Gordon Bilney	Labor	2nd Keating	Minister for Development Cooperation and Pacific Island Affairs	24 March 1993	11 March 1996	2 years, 353 days
3	Steven Ciobo	LNP	1st Turnbull	Minister for International Development and the Pacific	21 September 2015	18 February 2016	150 days
4	Concetta Fierravanti-Wells	Liberal	1st Turnbull	Minister for International Development and the Pacific	18 February 2016	19 July 2016	2 years, 185 days
4	Concetta Fierravanti-Wells	Liberal	2nd Turnbull	Minister for International Development and the Pacific	19 July 2016	22 August 2018	2 years, 185 days
5	Alex Hawke	Liberal	2nd Morrison	Minister for International Development and the Pacific	29 May 2019	22 December 2020	1 year, 207 days
6	Zed Seselja	Liberal	2nd Morrison	Minister for International Development and the Pacific	22 December 2020	23 May 2022	1 year, 152 days
7	Pat Conroy	Labor	1st Albanese	Minister for International Development and the Pacific	1 June 2022	13 May 2025	4 years, 98 days
7	Pat Conroy	Labor	2nd Albanese	Minister for Pacific Island Affairs	13 May 2025	Incumbent	4 years, 98 days

== Former ministerial titles ==
=== List of ministers assisting the minister for foreign affairs ===
The following individuals have been appointed as minister assisting the minister for foreign affairs or any of its precedent titles:

Order	Minister	Party	Prime Minister	Ministerial title	Term start	Term end	Term in office
1	John Gorton	Liberal	Menzies	Minister Assisting the Minister for External Affairs	23 March 1960	18 December 1963	3 years, 270 days
2	Don Willesee	Labor	Whitlam	Minister assisting the Minister for Foreign Affairs	19 December 1972	6 November 1973	322 days
3	Bill Morrison	Labor	Whitlam	Minister assisting the Minister for Foreign Affairs in matters relating to Papua New Guinea	30 November 1973	6 June 1975	1 year, 346 days
3	Bill Morrison	Labor	Whitlam	Minister assisting the Minister for Foreign Affairs in matters relating to the Islands of the Pacific	6 June 1975	11 November 1975	1 year, 346 days
4	Gareth Evans	Labor	Hawke	Minister assisting the Minister for Foreign Affairs	13 December 1984	24 July 1987	2 years, 223 days

== Parliamentary secretaries and assistant ministers ==
=== Foreign affairs ===
The following individuals have been appointed as parliamentary secretaries and assistant ministers for Foreign Affairs or any of its precedent titles:

Order	Minister	Party	Prime Minister	Ministerial title	Term start	Term end	Term in office
1	Stephen Martin	Labor	Keating	Parliamentary Secretary to the Minister for Foreign Affairs and Trade	27 December 1991	24 March 1993	1 year, 87 days
2	Andrew Thomson	Liberal	Howard	Parliamentary Secretary to the Minister for Foreign Affairs	11 March 1996	9 October 1997	1 year, 212 days
3	Kathy Sullivan	Liberal	Howard	Parliamentary Secretary to the Minister for Foreign Affairs	9 October 1997	16 February 2000	2 years, 130 days
4	Kay Patterson	Liberal	Howard	Parliamentary Secretary to the Minister for Foreign Affairs	16 February 2000	26 November 2001	1 year, 283 days
5	Chris Gallus	Liberal	Howard	Parliamentary Secretary to the Minister for Foreign Affairs	26 November 2001	18 July 2004	2 years, 235 days
6	Bruce Billson	Liberal	Howard	Parliamentary Secretary to the Minister for Foreign Affairs	18 July 2004	26 October 2004	1 year, 193 days
6	Bruce Billson	Liberal	Howard	Parliamentary Secretary for Foreign Affairs and Trade	26 October 2004	6 July 2005	1 year, 193 days
6	Bruce Billson	Liberal	Howard	Parliamentary Secretary to the Minister for Foreign Affairs	6 July 2005	27 January 2006	1 year, 193 days
7	Teresa Gambaro	Liberal	Howard	Parliamentary Secretary to the Minister for Foreign Affairs	27 January 2006	30 January 2007	1 year, 3 days
8	Greg Hunt	Liberal	Howard	Parliamentary Secretary to the Minister for Foreign Affairs	30 January 2007	3 December 2007	307 days
9	Richard Marles	Labor	Gillard	Parliamentary Secretary for Foreign Affairs	5 March 2012	22 March 2013	362 days
10	Brett Mason	Liberal	Abbott	Parliamentary Secretary to the Minister for Foreign Affairs	18 September 2013	23 December 2014	1 year, 96 days
11	Steven Ciobo	Liberal	Abbott	Parliamentary Secretary to the Minister for Foreign Affairs	23 December 2014	21 September 2015	272 days
12	Tim Watts	Labor	Albanese	Assistant Minister for Foreign Affairs	1 June 2022	13 May 2025	2 years, 346 days
13	Matt Thistlethwaite	Labor	Albanese	Assistant Minister for Foreign Affairs and Trade	13 May 2025	Incumbent	1 year, 117 days

=== Pacific island affairs ===
The following individuals have been appointed as parliamentary secretaries and assistant ministers for Pacific Island affairs or any of its precedent titles:

Order	Minister	Party	Ministry	Ministerial title	Term start	Term end	Term in office
1	Bill Morrison	Labor	2nd Whitlam	Minister Assisting the Minister for Foreign Affairs in matters relating to Papua New Guinea	30 November 1973	12 June 1974	1 year, 188 days
1	Bill Morrison	Labor	3rd Whitlam	Minister Assisting the Minister for Foreign Affairs in matters relating to Papua New Guinea	12 June 1974	6 June 1975	1 year, 188 days
1	Bill Morrison	Labor	3rd Whitlam	Minister Assisting the Minister for Foreign Affairs in matters relating to the Islands of the Pacific	6 June 1975	11 November 1975	1 year, 188 days
2	Duncan Kerr	Labor	1st Rudd	Parliamentary Secretary for Pacific Island Affairs	3 December 2007	14 December 2009	2 years, 11 days
3	Richard Marles	Labor	2nd Gillard	Parliamentary Secretary for Pacific Island Affairs	14 September 2010	22 March 2013	2 years, 189 days
4	Matt Thistlethwaite	Labor	2nd Gillard	Parliamentary Secretary for Pacific Island Affairs	22 March 2013	27 June 2013	180 days
4	Matt Thistlethwaite	Labor	2nd Rudd	Parliamentary Secretary for Pacific Island Affairs	22 June 2013	18 September 2013	180 days
5	Anne Ruston	Liberal	1st Morrison	Assistant Minister for International Development and the Pacific	28 August 2018	29 May 2019	274 days
6	Nita Green	Labor	2nd Albanese	Assistant Minister for Pacific Island Affairs	13 May 2025	Incumbent	1 year, 117 days

=== International development ===
The following individuals have been appointed as parliamentary secretaries and assistant ministers for Pacific Island affairs or any of its precedent titles:

Order	Minister	Party	Ministry	Ministerial title	Term start	Term end	Term in office
1	Bob McMullan	Labor	1st Rudd	Parliamentary Secretary for International Development Assistance	3 December 2007	24 June 2010	2 years, 285 days
1	Bob McMullan	Labor	1st Gillard	Parliamentary Secretary for International Development Assistance	24 June 2010	14 September 2010	2 years, 285 days
2	Anne Ruston	Liberal	1st Morrison	Assistant Minister for International Development and the Pacific	28 August 2018	29 May 2019	274 days

== See also ==
- List of ambassadors and high commissioners of Australia
