= Morrison ministry =

Morrison ministry may mean:

- First Morrison ministry (2018–2019), the 71st ministry of the Government of Australia
- Second Morrison ministry, (2019–2022), the 72nd ministry of the Government of Australia
