= Department of Foreign Affairs and Trade (Australia) =

Department of the Australian Government

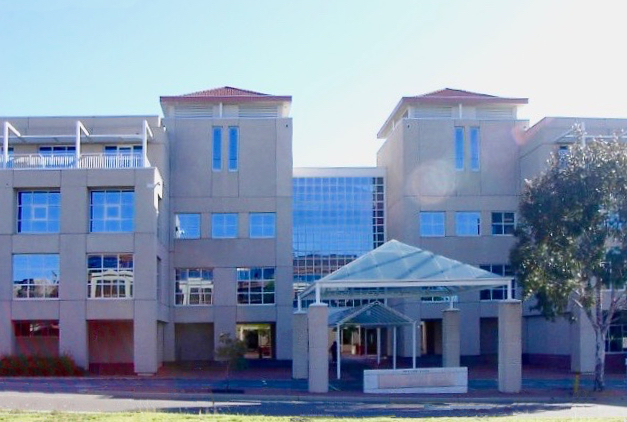
- R.G. Casey Building in Canberra, ACT

Department overview
- Formed: 24 July 1987; 39 years ago
- Preceding agencies: Department of Foreign Affairs; Department of Trade
- Jurisdiction: Australian government
- Headquarters: Barton, Australian Capital Territory
- Employees: ▼5,367 (2,363 deployed overseas)
- Annual budget: ▲ A$6.1 billion (2020–21)
- Ministers responsible: Penny Wong, Foreign Affairs; Don Farrell, Trade and Tourism; Pat Conroy, International Development and the Pacific; Tim Watts, Assistant for Foreign Affairs; Tim Ayres, Assistant for Trade
- Department executive: Jan Adams, Secretary
- Child agencies: Austrade; Australian Secret Intelligence Service; Australian Centre for International Agricultural Research; Tourism Australia; Export Finance Australia; Australian Aid; Australian Passport Office; Australian Safeguards and Non-proliferation Office
- Website: www.dfat.gov.au

The Department of Foreign Affairs and Trade (DFAT) is the department of the Australian Government responsible for foreign policy and international relations, development aid (under the name Australian Aid), consular services, overseas trade, and foreign direct investment (including trade and investment promotion agency Austrade). Australia's official development assistance (ODA) (US$3 billion) decreased in 2022 due to differences in Australia's financial year reporting and the timing of its COVID-19–related expenditure, representing 0.19% of gross national income (GNI).

The department is led by a permanent secretary, currently Jan Adams. She reports to Penny Wong, who has held the position of Minister for Foreign Affairs since 2022.

== History ==
The department finds its origins in two of the seven original Commonwealth Departments established following Federation in 1901: the Department of Trade and Customs and the Department of External Affairs (DEA), headed by Harry Wollaston and Atlee Hunt respectively.

The first DEA was abolished on 14 November 1916 and its responsibilities were undertaken by the Prime Minister's Department and the Department of Home and Territories. It was re-established under the same name on 21 December 1921.

The DEA was renamed the Department of Foreign Affairs in 1970. On 24 July 1987, the Department of Foreign Affairs and the Department of Trade were amalgamated by the Hawke government to form the Department of Foreign Affairs and Trade (DFAT).

In 1994, the Australian Overseas Information Service (AOIS, formerly Australian Information Service) became a branch in DFAT known as the International Public Affairs Branch. In 1996 the branch was dissolved.

In 1996, DFAT was subject to public and parliamentary scrutiny following media reporting of allegations that some Australian diplomatic staff may have been involved in sexual misconduct with children while posted overseas. The opposition Australian Labor Party called for a full judicial inquiry with public hearings, but the Government instead initiated internal reviews and administrative investigations, and the Australian Federal Police examined a number of related complaints. The matters did not result in a single comprehensive public inquiry or systemic judicial findings.

In 2004, former Australian aid and diplomatic employee William Stewart Brown, who had worked in Indonesia, was sentenced by an Indonesian court to 13 years’ imprisonment for sexually abusing two underage boys in Bali. He reacted emotionally during sentencing and denied parts of the allegations while admitting to some sexual contact. Shortly after the verdict, Brown died in custody in Bali after hanging himself in his prison cell.

In 2005, DFAT became embroiled in the Oil-for-Food Programme scandal after it was revealed it had approved the Australian Wheat Board's (AWB) request allowing it to pay 'trucking charges' to Alia, a Jordanian trucking company with no actual involvement in the trucking of Australian wheat within Iraq. The Cole Inquiry into the AWB was established, however its terms of reference excluded any investigation of the role of DFAT.

In 1997 the department relocated to the R. G. Casey building, constructed over 5 years for $187 million. The next year the building was sold to the private market for $217 million and released back by the government. By 2015 the government was paying over $20 million per year in rent. By 2017 the government had spent $310 million in total rent for the building.

In 1960, the DEA closed the Marmalade Files. The Marmalade Files or the South African Marmalade are a collection of 223 pages accumulated by the Department of Foreign Affairs and Trade of Australia. These files include 4 parts and the other 3 parts are reported to have been suppressed or destroyed. The remnants of the Marmalade Files are to be retained permanently in the NNA. The first part of the Marmalade Files were officially introduced on 21 November 1947, and were closed on 10 April 1960. The Marmalade Files were created to acknowledge the first folios of the collection, regarding an Irish Press advertisement sent to the Department of External Affairs for "favour of advice." The advertisement promoted 200 'case lots' of jam manufactured in South Africa, which were selling for 20 shillings, whereas 50 and 100 'case lots' were selling for 20/6 and 21 shillings (respectively); hence the name 'South African Marmalade.'

== Portfolio responsibilities ==
The functions of the department are broadly classified into the following matters as laid out in an Administrative Arrangements Order made on 13 May 2025:

- External Affairs, including
  - relations and communications with overseas governments and United Nations agencies
  - treaties, including trade agreements
  - bilateral, regional and multilateral trade policy
  - international trade and commodity negotiations
  - market development, including market access
  - trade and international business development
  - investment promotion
  - international development co-operation
  - diplomatic and consular missions
  - international security issues, including disarmament, arms control, nuclear non-proliferation, counter terrorism and cyber affairs
  - public diplomacy, including information and cultural programs
- International expositions
- Provision to Australian citizens of secure travel identification
- Provision of consular services to Australian citizens abroad
- Overseas property management, including acquisition, ownership and disposal of real property
- Tourism industry
- International development and aid
- International climate diplomacy
- Implementation of Australia's international climate finance commitment

== Portfolio ministers ==
Five additional ministers support the Minister for Foreign Affairs in administering the department, as of 2025:

- Minister for Trade and Tourism, Senator Don Farrell
- Minister for Pacific Island Affairs, Pat Conroy MP
- Minister for International Development, Anne Aly MP
- Assistant Minister for Foreign Affairs and Trade, Matt Thistlethwaite MP
- Assistant Minister for Pacific Island Affairs and Assistant Minister for Tourism, Senator Nita Green

== Secretary of the Department ==
DFAT is administered by a senior executive, comprising a secretary and five deputy secretaries. On the recommendation of the Prime Minister, the Governor-General has appointed the following individuals as Secretary to the department:

Order	Official	Date appointment commenced	Date appointment ceased	Term in office	Ref(s)
1	Stuart Harris AO	3 September 1984	3 July 1988	3 years, 304 days	
2	Richard Woolcott AC	1 September 1988	15 February 1992	3 years, 167 days	
3	Peter Wilenski AC	15 February 1992	14 May 1993	1 year, 88 days	
4	Michael Costello AO	27 May 1993	8 March 1996	2 years, 286 days	
5	Philip Flood AO	8 March 1996	31 March 1998	2 years, 23 days	
6	Ashton Calvert AC	1 April 1998	4 January 2005	6 years, 278 days	
7	Michael L'Estrange AO	24 January 2005	13 August 2009	4 years, 201 days	
8	Dennis Richardson AO	13 August 2009	18 October 2012	3 years, 66 days	
9	Peter Varghese AO	18 October 2012	22 July 2016	3 years, 278 days	
10	Frances Adamson AC	22 July 2016	25 June 2021	4 years, 338 days	
11	Kathryn Campbell AO, CSC & Bar	22 July 2021	1 July 2022	344 days	
12	Jan Adams AO PSM	1 July 2022	Incumbent	4 years, 144 days	

== Structure ==
The department is responsible to the Minister for Foreign Affairs, the Minister for Trade, Tourism and Investment, the Minister for International Development and the Pacific, and the Assistant Minister for Trade, Tourism and Investment.

As of June 2023, 3,881 Australian Public Service (APS) staff worked for DFAT in Australia and 959 worked in the overseas network. Additionally, DFAT employed 2,267 locally engaged staff (LES) in the overseas network. LES are citizens of the country in which the relevant DFAT Post is located, providing invaluable administrative and policy support to Australian officers whilst they conduct their overseas duties.

=== Departmental structure ===
The department is structured into seven groups, each led by a deputy secretary.

- The Secretary
  - Chief of Staff to the Secretary
- Trade and Investment Group (TIG)
  - Trade and Investment Strategy Branch (TIB)
    - State and Territory Offices
  - Trade and Investment Law Division (TLD)
  - Trade Resilience, Indo-Pacific Economic, and Latin America Division (TID)
  - International Economics and Energy Transition Division (IGD)
  - Free Trade Agreements & Stakeholder Engagement Division (FSD)
  - Office of Global Trade Negotiations (OTN)
- Strategic Planning and Coordination Group (SCG)
  - Strategic Communications Division (SGD)
  - East Asia Division (EAD)
  - Geostrategy and Partnerships Division (GPD)
  - Defence and National Security Policy Division (DND)
  - National Foundation for Australia–China Relations (NFACR; established 2019) (Note: In 2019, the Australia–China Council was decommissioned by the Morrison government and replaced by the National Foundation for Australia–China Relations. Unlike the Australia–China Council, which was governed by the board, the advisory board of the new body it exists in an advisory capacity only to the Foreign Minister, effectively operating as "just an agency of DFAT", according to chair Warwick Smith, who resigned a year after being appointed. NFACR supports the Foundation for Australian Studies in China (FASIC), which works with partners Australia–China Youth Dialogue and Western Sydney University's Australia–China Institute for Arts and Culture.)
- South and Southeast Asia Group (SSG)
  - Office of Southeast Asia (OSA)
  - Southeast Asia Maritime Division (SMD)
  - Southeast Asia Regional and Mainland Division (SRD)
  - Southeast Asia Strategy and Development Division (SSD)
  - South and Central Asia Division (SXD)
  - Centre for Australia–India Relations (CAIR)
- Office of the Pacific (OTP)
  - Pacific Infrastructure & Economic Division (PED)
  - Pacific Strategy Division (PSD)
  - Melanesia Division (PMD)
  - Pacific Integration Division (PID)
  - Polynesia, Micronesia and Development Division (PDD)
  - Australian Infrastructure Financing Facility for the Pacific (AIFFP)
- Development, Multilateral and Europe Group (DMG)
  - Multilateral Policy and Human Rights Division (MPD)
  - Development Policy Division (DPD)
  - Development Effectiveness and Enabling Division (PRD)
  - Humanitarian Division (HPD)
  - Climate Diplomacy and Development Finance Division (CSD)
  - Ambassador for Global Health Global Health Division (GHD)
  - Europe Division (EUD)
- International Security, Legal and Consular Group (ISG)
  - Legal Division (LGD)
  - Regulatory and Legal Policy Division (RLD)
  - Consular and Crisis Management Division (CCD)
  - Middle East and Africa Division (MAD)
  - International Security Division (ISD)
  - Australian Safeguards and Non-Proliferation Office (ASNO)
  - Australian Passport Office (APO)
- Enabling Services Group (ESG)
  - Finance Division (FND)
  - Diplomatic Security Division (DSD)
  - Overseas Property Office (OPO)
  - Information Management and Technology Division (IMD)
  - People Division (PPD)
  - Executive Division (EXD)
    - Internal Audit Branch(AUB)

=== Diplomatic network ===
DFAT maintains offices in each state and mainland territory to provide consular and passport services, and to perform an important liaison service for business throughout Australia. In addition, it has a Torres Strait Treaty Liaison Office on Thursday Island. Additionally, the department manages a network of 116 overseas posts, including Australian embassies, high commissions and consulates-general.

=== Portfolio agencies ===
DFAT also manages several agencies within its portfolio, including:

- Australian Trade and Investment Commission (Austrade)
- Export Finance and Insurance Corporation
- Australian Secret Intelligence Service
- Australian Centre for International Agricultural Research

As of June 2025 DFAT also manages foundations, councils, and institutes including:

- ASEAN–Australia Centre
- National Foundation for Australia–China Relations
- Australia–Indonesia Institute (AII)
- Australia–Japan Foundation (AJF)
- Australia–Korea Foundation (AKF)
- Centre for Australia–India Relations
- Council for Australian–Arab Relations (CAAR)
- Council on Australia Latin America Relations (COALAR)

== See also ==
- Australia–China Council (until 2019)
- Australian Information Service
- Australian Volunteers for International Development
- Five Nations Passport Group
- List of Australian Government entities
- List of ambassadors and high commissioners of Australia
