= Minister for Pacific Island Affairs =

Australian ministerial position

- Commonwealth Coat of Arms

- Flag of Australia

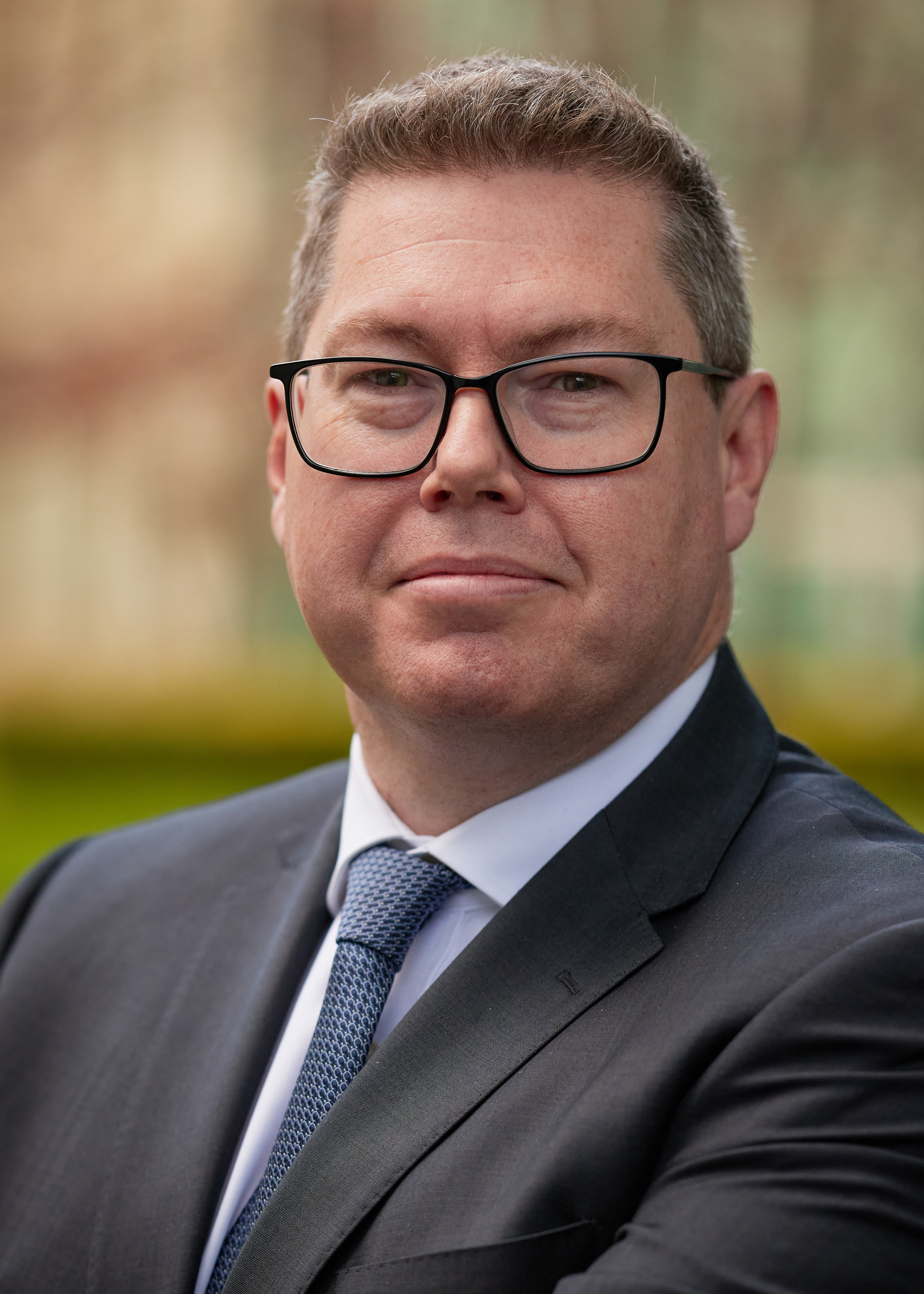
- Incumbent; Pat Conroy since 1 June 2022
- Department of Foreign Affairs and Trade
- Style: The Honourable
- Appointer: Governor-General on the advice of the prime minister
- Inaugural holder: Bill Morrison (as Minister Assisting the Minister for Foreign Affairs in matters relating to Papua New Guinea)
- Formation: 30 November 1973
- Website: ministers.dfat.gov.au/minister/pat-conroy-mp/home

The Minister for Pacific Island Affairs is a ministerial post of the Australian Government and is currently held by Pat Conroy since June 2022 in the Albanese ministry.

== List of ministers for Pacific Island affairs ==
In 2025, in the second Albanese ministry, the portfolio of Minister for International Development and the Pacific was split into two: Minister for International Development, held by Anne Aly, and Minister for Pacific Island Affairs, held by Pat Conroy.

The following individuals have been appointed as Minister for Pacific Island Affairs, or any precedent title:

Order	Minister	Party	Ministry	Ministerial title	Term start	Term end	Term in office
1	Bill Morrison	Labor	Whitlam	Minister assisting the Minister for Foreign Affairs in matters relating to Papua New Guinea	30 November 1973	6 June 1975	1 year, 346 days
1	Bill Morrison	Labor	Whitlam	Minister assisting the Minister for Foreign Affairs in matters relating to the Islands of the Pacific	6 June 1975	11 November 1975	1 year, 346 days
2	Gordon Bilney	Labor	2nd Keating	Minister for Development Cooperation and Pacific Island Affairs	24 March 1993	11 March 1996	2 years, 353 days
3	Steven Ciobo	LNP	1st Turnbull	Minister for International Development and the Pacific	21 September 2015	18 February 2016	150 days
4	Concetta Fierravanti-Wells	Liberal	1st Turnbull	Minister for International Development and the Pacific	18 February 2016	19 July 2016	2 years, 185 days
4	Concetta Fierravanti-Wells	Liberal	2nd Turnbull	Minister for International Development and the Pacific	19 July 2016	22 August 2018	2 years, 185 days
5	Alex Hawke	Liberal	2nd Morrison	Minister for International Development and the Pacific	29 May 2019	22 December 2020	1 year, 207 days
6	Zed Seselja	Liberal	2nd Morrison	Minister for International Development and the Pacific	22 December 2020	23 May 2022	1 year, 152 days
7	Pat Conroy	Labor	1st Albanese	Minister for International Development and the Pacific	1 June 2022	13 May 2025	4 years, 98 days
7	Pat Conroy	Labor	2nd Albanese	Minister for Pacific Island Affairs	13 May 2025	Incumbent	4 years, 98 days

== List of assistant ministers ==
The following individuals have been appointed as parliamentary secretaries and assistant ministers for Pacific Island affairs or any of its precedent titles:

Order	Minister	Party	Ministry	Ministerial title	Term start	Term end	Term in office
1	Bill Morrison	Labor	2nd Whitlam	Minister Assisting the Minister for Foreign Affairs in matters relating to Papua New Guinea	30 November 1973	12 June 1974	1 year, 188 days
1	Bill Morrison	Labor	3rd Whitlam	Minister Assisting the Minister for Foreign Affairs in matters relating to Papua New Guinea	12 June 1974	6 June 1975	1 year, 188 days
1	Bill Morrison	Labor	3rd Whitlam	Minister Assisting the Minister for Foreign Affairs in matters relating to the Islands of the Pacific	6 June 1975	11 November 1975	1 year, 188 days
2	Duncan Kerr	Labor	1st Rudd	Parliamentary Secretary for Pacific Island Affairs	3 December 2007	14 December 2009	2 years, 11 days
3	Richard Marles	Labor	2nd Gillard	Parliamentary Secretary for Pacific Island Affairs	14 September 2010	22 March 2013	2 years, 189 days
4	Matt Thistlethwaite	Labor	2nd Gillard	Parliamentary Secretary for Pacific Island Affairs	22 March 2013	27 June 2013	180 days
4	Matt Thistlethwaite	Labor	2nd Rudd	Parliamentary Secretary for Pacific Island Affairs	22 June 2013	18 September 2013	180 days
5	Anne Ruston	Liberal	1st Morrison	Assistant Minister for International Development and the Pacific	28 August 2018	29 May 2019	274 days
6	Nita Green	Labor	2nd Albanese	Assistant Minister for Pacific Island Affairs	13 May 2025	Incumbent	1 year, 117 days
