= Minister for International Development =

Australian ministerial position

- Commonwealth Coat of Arms

- Flag of Australia

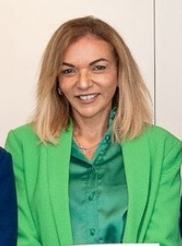
- Incumbent; Anne Aly since 13 May 2025
- Department of Foreign Affairs and Trade
- Style: The Honourable
- Appointer: Governor-General on the advice of the prime minister
- Inaugural holder: Neal Blewett (as Minister for Trade and Overseas Development)
- Formation: 1 February 1991
- Website: ministers.dfat.gov.au/minister/anne-aly/home

The Minister for International Development is the minister of state of the Commonwealth of Australia charged with oversight of government policy related to international development. It is currently held by Anne Aly.

== Scope ==
The Minister for International Development was responsible, in the Rudd Cabinet, for the Australian Agency for International Development (AusAID) and the international development and humanitarian aid policies of the Commonwealth of Australia, administered through the Department of Foreign Affairs and Trade (DFAT). AusAID was abolished by the incoming prime minister, Tony Abbott, in September 2013 and under the operations of the Abbott Cabinet its functions were absorbed into DFAT.

== List of ministers for international development ==
The following individuals have been appointed as Minister for International Development, or any precedent title:

Order	Minister	Party	Ministry	Ministerial title	Term start	Term end	Term in office
1	Neal Blewett	Labor	4th Hawke	Minister for Trade and Overseas Development	1 February 1991	20 December 1991	329 days
1	Neal Blewett	Labor	1st Keating	Minister for Trade and Overseas Development	20 December 1991	27 December 1991	329 days
2	John Kerin	Labor	1st Keating	Minister for Trade and Overseas Development	27 December 1991	24 March 1993	1 year, 87 days
3	Gordon Bilney	Labor	2nd Keating	Minister for Development Cooperation and Pacific Island Affairs	24 March 1993	11 March 1996	2 years, 353 days
4	Melissa Parke	Labor	2nd Rudd	Minister for International Development	1 July 2013	18 September 2013	79 days
5	Steven Ciobo	LNP	1st Turnbull	Minister for International Development and the Pacific	21 September 2015	18 February 2016	150 days
6	Concetta Fierravanti-Wells	Liberal	1st Turnbull	Minister for International Development and the Pacific	18 February 2016	19 July 2016	2 years, 185 days
6	Concetta Fierravanti-Wells	Liberal	2nd Turnbull	Minister for International Development and the Pacific	19 July 2016	22 August 2018	2 years, 185 days
7	Alex Hawke	Liberal	2nd Morrison	Minister for International Development and the Pacific	29 May 2019	22 December 2020	1 year, 207 days
8	Zed Seselja	Liberal	2nd Morrison	Minister for International Development and the Pacific	22 December 2020	23 May 2022	1 year, 152 days
9	Pat Conroy	Labor	1st Albanese	Minister for International Development and the Pacific	1 June 2022	13 May 2025	2 years, 346 days
10	Anne Aly	Labor	2nd Albanese	Minister for International Development	13 May 2025	Incumbent	1 year, 117 days

== List of assistant ministers ==
The following individuals have been appointed as parliamentary secretaries and assistant ministers for Pacific Island affairs or any of its precedent titles:

Order	Minister	Party	Ministry	Ministerial title	Term start	Term end	Term in office
1	Bob McMullan	Labor	1st Rudd	Parliamentary Secretary for International Development Assistance	3 December 2007	24 June 2010	2 years, 285 days
1	Bob McMullan	Labor	1st Gillard	Parliamentary Secretary for International Development Assistance	24 June 2010	14 September 2010	2 years, 285 days
2	Anne Ruston	Liberal	1st Morrison	Assistant Minister for International Development and the Pacific	28 August 2018	29 May 2019	274 days
