= Deputy Prime Minister of Australia =

Second officer of Australian government

- Commonwealth Coat of Arms

- Flag of Australia

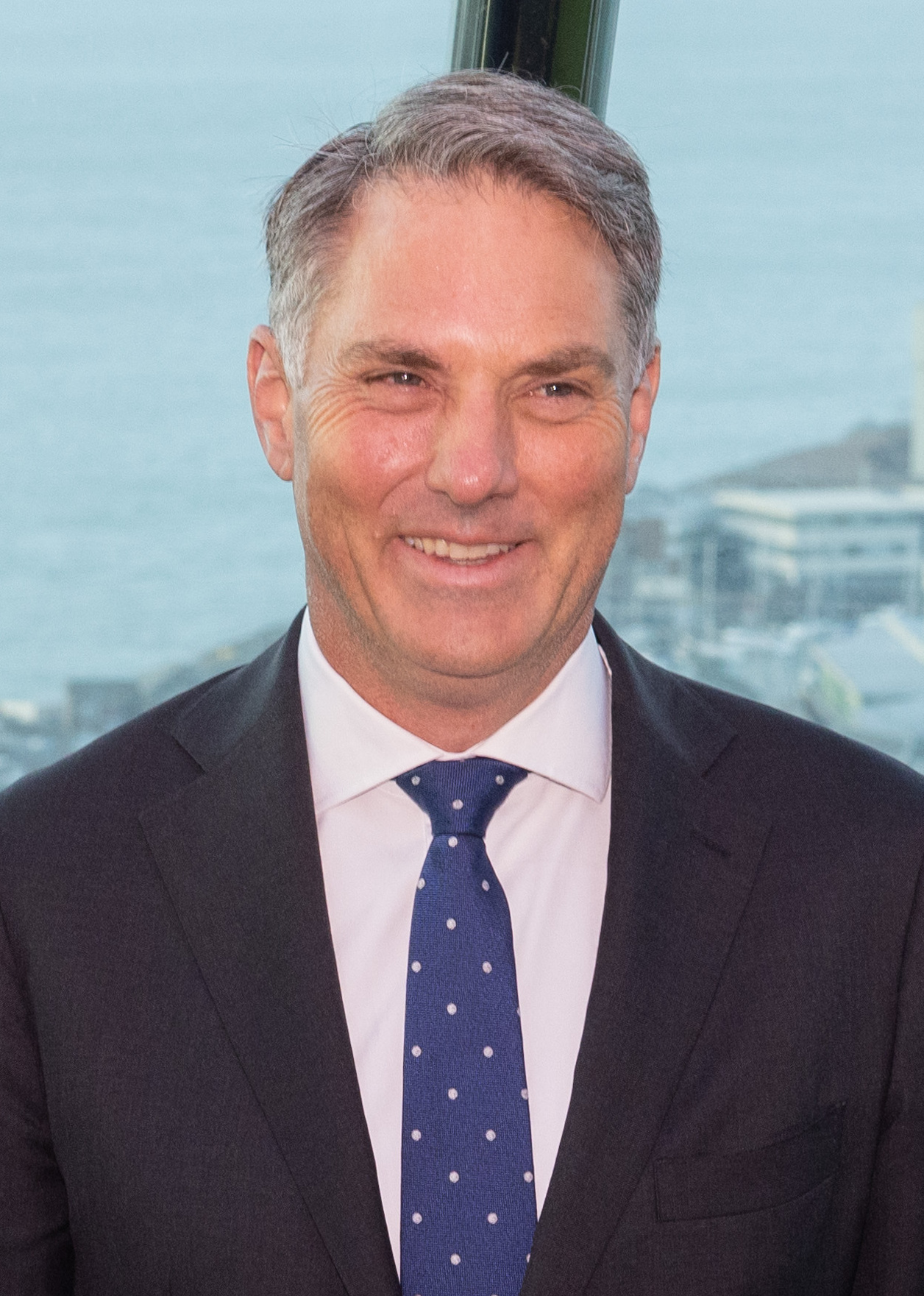
- Incumbent; Richard Marles since 23 May 2022
- Style: The Honourable
- Abbreviation: DPM
- Member of: Parliament; Cabinet; Federal Executive Council; National Security Committee
- Reports to: Prime Minister
- Seat: Canberra
- Appointer: Governor-General of Australia; on the advice of the prime minister
- Term length: At the Governor-General's pleasure
- Formation: 10 January 1968; 58 years ago
- First holder: John McEwen
- Salary: AU$416,212 (2018)

The deputy prime minister of Australia is the deputy head of government and the second highest ranking officer of the Australian Government. The office of deputy prime minister was officially created as a ministerial portfolio in 1968, although the title had been used informally for many years previously. The deputy prime minister is appointed by the governor-general on the advice of the prime minister. When Australia has a Labor government, the deputy leader of the parliamentary party holds the position of deputy prime minister. When Australia has a Coalition government, the Coalition Agreement mandates that all Coalition members support the leader of the Liberal Party becoming prime minister and the leader of the National Party becoming the deputy prime minister.

== History ==
=== Early and unofficial usage ===
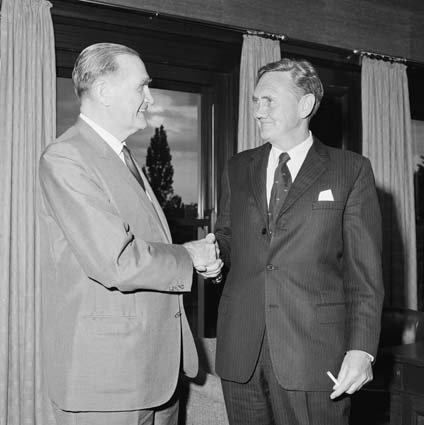
Prime Minister John McEwen with John Gorton on 9 January 1968. The following day, Gorton was sworn in as prime minister, and McEwen became the inaugural deputy prime minister.

Originally the position of deputy prime minister was an unofficial or honorary position accorded to the second-highest ranking minister in the government. The unofficial position acquired more significance following the 1922 federal election, which saw the governing Nationalist Party lose its parliamentary majority. The Nationalists eventually reached a coalition agreement with the Country Party, which called for Country Party leader Earle Page to take the second rank in the Nationalist-led ministry of Stanley Bruce. While Page's only official title was treasurer, he was considered as a deputy to Bruce. Since then, the Coalition agreement between the Liberals (and their predecessors) and Country Party called for the leader of the Country Party (subsequently the National Party) to rank second in Cabinet. That continues to be the case when the Coalition is in government. In the case of Labor governments, the party's deputy leader ranks second in Cabinet.

Although no office of that name had officially been created, by 1946 the title "deputy prime minister" was being used in the Commonwealth of Australia Gazette. According to political historian Colin Hughes, the title was in common usage in official ministerial lists by the 1960s but the designation was "not of an official post and no firm date for its inception can be provided".

According to parliamentary records, in the time before the position of deputy prime minister was officially created, the position was known as "deputy leader of the Government."

=== Official usage ===
The formal title of "deputy prime minister" was created when the first Gorton ministry was formed on 10 January 1968. The inaugural holder was John McEwen, the long-serving leader of the Country Party, who had been appointed prime minister following the disappearance of Harold Holt in December 1967 and was succeeded by John Gorton after a Liberal leadership election. McEwen had been the de facto deputy prime minister since becoming Country Party leader in 1958.

Since 1968 three deputy prime ministers have gone on to become prime minister, all Australian Labor Party politicians: Paul Keating, Julia Gillard, and Anthony Albanese. Both Keating and Gillard succeeded incumbent prime ministers who lost the support of their party caucus mid-term, while Albanese briefly served as deputy prime minister in 2013 and later led Labor to victory at the 2022 federal election. Frank Forde, who had been deputy Labor leader when John Curtin died, was interim prime minister between 6 and 13 July 1945, when a leadership ballot took place that elected Ben Chifley as Curtin's successor.

In November 2007, when the Labor Party won government, Julia Gillard became Australia's first female, and first foreign-born, deputy prime minister.

=== Vacancies ===
The position was vacant for 12 days in 1975 at the height of the Loans Affair; Jim Cairns had been dismissed from Cabinet on 2 July and had his office of deputy prime minister revoked by Gough Whitlam, but he remained deputy leader of the Labor Party until his successor, Frank Crean, was elected by Caucus on 14 July.

In 2017, the position became vacant for a period of 40 days, the longest time in its history when it has been unoccupied. As part of the 2017–18 Australian parliamentary eligibility crisis, it emerged that the then-incumbent Barnaby Joyce was a citizen of New Zealand by descent (jus sanguinis – by right of blood) at the time of the 2016 federal election. Joyce told the House of Representatives that he was advised of his citizenship status on 10 August 2017 by the New Zealand High Commission and his renunciation of his dual citizenship became effective on 15 August 2017. Nevertheless, he asked for his case to be referred to the High Court of Australia (sitting as the Court of Disputed Returns) for adjudication, and they ruled that his election was invalid under section 44 of the Constitution of Australia. The government immediately issued writs for a by-election for the seat of New England to be held on 2 December 2017, which Joyce won easily. Governor-General Sir Peter Cosgrove re-appointed Joyce as deputy prime minister on 6 December 2017.

== Duties ==
The deputy prime minister has always been a member of the Cabinet, and has always held at least one substantive portfolio.

=== Succession ===
The deputy prime minister becomes acting prime minister if the prime minister is unable to undertake their role for a short time, for example if they are ill, overseas or on leave (and if both are unavailable, then another senior minister takes on this role). If the prime minister were to die, the established convention is that the deputy prime minister would be appointed prime minister by the governor-general, until the government votes for another member to be its leader.

== Salary ==
As of 2018, members of parliament receive a base salary of $203,030, which is set by the Remuneration Tribunal (an independent statutory authority). Ministers receive an additional amount, which is determined by the government itself based on the recommendations of the Remuneration Tribunal. As of 2018 the deputy prime minister receives an additional 105 percent of the base salary, making for a total salary of $416,212. The holder of the office also receives various other allowances and entitlements.

== List of deputy prime ministers of Australia ==
The following individuals have been officially appointed as deputy prime minister of Australia since the office of deputy prime minister was created as a ministerial portfolio in 1968:

No.	Portrait	Deputy Prime Minister	Political Party and position	Portfolio(s)	Term of office			Prime Minister
No.	Portrait	Deputy Prime Minister	Political Party and position	Portfolio(s)	Took office	Left office	Time in office	Prime Minister
1		John McEwen (1900–1980); MP for Murray, Vic	Country; Leader 1958–71	Trade and Industry	10 January 1968	5 February 1971	3 years, 26 days	John Gorton
2		Doug Anthony (1929–2020); MP for Richmond, NSW	Country; Leader 1971–84	Trade and Industry	5 February 1971	5 December 1972	1 year, 304 days	John Gorton
2		Doug Anthony (1929–2020); MP for Richmond, NSW	Country; Leader 1971–84	Trade and Industry	5 February 1971	5 December 1972	1 year, 304 days	William McMahon
3		Lance Barnard (1919–1997); MP for Bass, Tas	Labor; Deputy Leader 1967–74	Defence	5 December 1972	12 June 1974	1 year, 189 days	Gough Whitlam
4		Jim Cairns (1914–2003); MP for Lalor, Vic	Labor; Deputy Leader 1974–75	Treasurer	12 June 1974	2 July 1975	1 year, 20 days	Gough Whitlam
Office vacant								Gough Whitlam
5		Frank Crean (1916–2008); MP for Melbourne Ports, Vic	Labor; Deputy Leader 1975	Overseas Trade	14 July 1975	11 November 1975	132 days	Gough Whitlam
(2)		Doug Anthony (1929–2020); MP for Richmond, NSW	Country National; Leader 1971–84	Trade and Resources	12 November 1975	11 March 1983	7 years, 119 days	Malcolm Fraser
6		Lionel Bowen (1922–2012); MP for Kingsford Smith, NSW	Labor; Deputy Leader 1977–90	Trade; Attorney-General	11 March 1983	4 April 1990	7 years, 24 days	Bob Hawke
7		Paul Keating (b. 1944); MP for Blaxland, NSW	Labor; Deputy Leader 1990–91	Treasurer	4 April 1990	3 June 1991	1 year, 60 days	Bob Hawke
8		Brian Howe (b. 1936); MP for Batman, Vic	Labor; Deputy Leader 1991–95	Health, Housing and Community Services, Assisting for Social Justice, Assisting for Commonwealth-State Relations	3 June 1991	20 December 1991	4 years, 17 days	Bob Hawke
8		Brian Howe (b. 1936); MP for Batman, Vic	Labor; Deputy Leader 1991–95	Health, Housing and Community Services, Assisting for Social Justice, Assisting for Commonwealth-State Relations	20 December 1991	24 March 1993	4 years, 17 days	Paul Keating
8		Brian Howe (b. 1936); MP for Batman, Vic	Labor; Deputy Leader 1991–95	Housing, Local Government and Community Services	24 March 1993	23 December 1993	4 years, 17 days	Paul Keating
8		Brian Howe (b. 1936); MP for Batman, Vic	Labor; Deputy Leader 1991–95	Housing, Local Government and Human Services	23 December 1993	25 March 1994	4 years, 17 days	Paul Keating
8		Brian Howe (b. 1936); MP for Batman, Vic	Labor; Deputy Leader 1991–95	Housing and Regional Development	25 March 1994	20 June 1995	4 years, 17 days	Paul Keating
9		Kim Beazley (b.1948); MP for Swan, WA	Labor; Deputy Leader 1995–96	Finance	20 June 1995	11 March 1996	265 days	Paul Keating
10		Tim Fischer (1946–2019); MP for Farrer, NSW	National; Leader 1990–99	Trade	11 March 1996	20 July 1999	3 years, 131 days	John Howard
11		John Anderson (b. 1956); MP for Gwydir, NSW	National; Leader 1999–2005	Transport and Regional Development	20 July 1999	6 July 2005	5 years, 351 days	John Howard
12		Mark Vaile (b. 1956); MP for Lyne, NSW	National; Leader 2005–2007	Trade; Transport and Regional Services	6 July 2005	3 December 2007	2 years, 150 days	John Howard
13		Julia Gillard (b. 1961); MP for Lalor, Vic	Labor; Deputy Leader 2006–10	Employment and Workplace Relations; Education; Social Inclusion	3 December 2007	24 June 2010	2 years, 203 days	Kevin Rudd
14		Wayne Swan (b. 1954); MP for Lilley, Qld	Labor; Deputy Leader 2010–13	Treasurer	24 June 2010	27 June 2013	3 years, 3 days	Julia Gillard
15		Anthony Albanese (b. 1963); MP for Grayndler, NSW	Labor; Deputy Leader 2013	Broadband, Communications and the Digital Economy; Infrastructure and Transport	27 June 2013	18 September 2013	83 days	Kevin Rudd
16		Warren Truss (b. 1948); MP for Wide Bay, Qld	National; Leader 2007–16	Infrastructure and Regional Development	18 September 2013	18 February 2016	2 years, 153 days	Tony Abbott
16		Warren Truss (b. 1948); MP for Wide Bay, Qld	National; Leader 2007–16	Infrastructure and Regional Development	18 September 2013	18 February 2016	2 years, 153 days	Malcolm Turnbull
17		Barnaby Joyce (b. 1967); MP for New England, NSW	National; Leader 2016–18	Agriculture and Water Resources; Resources and Northern Australia (2017)	18 February 2016	27 October 2017	1 year, 251 days	Malcolm Turnbull
17		Barnaby Joyce (b. 1967); MP for New England, NSW	National; Leader 2016–18	Office vacant				Malcolm Turnbull
17		Barnaby Joyce (b. 1967); MP for New England, NSW	National; Leader 2016–18	Infrastructure and Transport	6 December 2017	26 February 2018	82 days	Malcolm Turnbull
18		Michael McCormack (b.1964); MP for Riverina, NSW	National; Leader 2018–2021	Infrastructure, Transport and Regional Development	26 February 2018	24 August 2018	3 years, 116 days	Malcolm Turnbull
18		Michael McCormack (b.1964); MP for Riverina, NSW	National; Leader 2018–2021	Infrastructure, Transport and Regional Development	24 August 2018	22 June 2021	3 years, 116 days	Scott Morrison
(17)		Barnaby Joyce (b. 1967); MP for New England, NSW	National; Leader 2021–2022	Infrastructure, Transport and Regional Development	22 June 2021	23 May 2022	335 days	Scott Morrison
19		Richard Marles (b. 1967); MP for Corio, Vic	Labor; Deputy Leader 2019–present	Defence	23 May 2022	Incumbent	4 years, 177 days	Anthony Albanese

== Living former deputy prime ministers ==
As of 16 November 2026, there are 11 living former deputy prime ministers of Australia, the oldest being Brian Howe (born 1936). The most recent former deputy prime minister to die was Doug Anthony (1971–72, 1975–83), on 20 December 2020. The most recent serving former deputy prime minister to die was Tim Fischer (1996–99), on 22 August 2019.

- Paul Keating (1990–91)
- Brian Howe (1991–95)
- Kim Beazley (1995–96)
- John Anderson (1999–05)
- Mark Vaile (2005–07)
- Julia Gillard (2007–10)
- Wayne Swan (2010–13)
- Anthony Albanese (2013)
- Warren Truss (2013–16)
- Barnaby Joyce (2016–18, 2021–22)
- Michael McCormack (2018–21)

== List of assistant ministers to the deputy prime minister ==
The role of assistant minister to the deputy prime minister was created in the first Turnbull ministry in September 2015 where Michael McCormack was appointed as the inaugural officeholder under Warren Truss. The retirement of Truss saw Barnaby Joyce elected as leader of National Party and deputy prime minister and with it Keith Pitt's appointment. Luke Hartsuyker was appointed to the role as the start of Turnbull's second ministry serving until the reshuffle in December 2017 where Damian Drum took over. With Joyce's resignation in February 2018 and the subsequent election of McCormack as leader, the cabinet was reshuffled again. Drum was dropped from the ministry and Pitt was once again appointed. Andrew Broad was appointed as McCormack's assistant minister in the first Morrison ministry but resigned in December 2018 following a sex scandal. He was replaced by Andrew Gee in January 2019. Following the Coalition's election victory in May 2019, Gee remained in the position at the start of the second Morrison ministry until the National Party leadership spill in February 2020. This resulted in a reshuffle with Gee being promoted to the outer ministry and Kevin Hogan appointment to the role. Hogan became the longest-serving assistant minister, remaining in the role until the end of the Morrison government in May 2022 and seeing the return of Joyce as the deputy prime minister in June 2021. The role has not been included in either of Albanese's ministries since being elected prime minister.

Order	Minister	Party affiliation	Ministry	Ministerial title	Term start	Term end	Term in office	Ref
1	Michael McCormack	National	1st Turnbull	Assistant Minister to the Deputy Prime Minister	21 September 2015	18 February 2016	150 days	
2	Keith Pitt	National (LNP)	1st Turnbull	Assistant Minister to the Deputy Prime Minister	18 February 2016	19 July 2016	152 days	
3	Luke Hartsuyker	National	2nd Turnbull	Assistant Minister to the Deputy Prime Minister	19 July 2016	20 December 2017	1 year, 154 days	
4	Damian Drum	National	2nd Turnbull	Assistant Minister to the Deputy Prime Minister	20 December 2017	5 March 2018	75 days	
(2)	Keith Pitt	National (LNP)	2nd Turnbull	Assistant Minister to the Deputy Prime Minister	5 March 2018	28 August 2018	176 days	
5	Andrew Broad	National	1st Morrison	Assistant Minister to the Deputy Prime Minister	28 August 2018	18 December 2018	112 days	
6	Andrew Gee	National	1st Morrison	Assistant Minister to the Deputy Prime Minister	25 January 2019	29 May 2019	1 year, 12 days	
6	Andrew Gee	National	2nd Morrison	Assistant Minister to the Deputy Prime Minister	29 May 2019	6 February 2020	1 year, 12 days	
7	Kevin Hogan	National	2nd Morrison	Assistant Minister to the Deputy Prime Minister	6 February 2020	23 May 2022	2 years, 106 days	
