= 2021 National Party of Australia leadership spill =

- 21 June 2021

21 caucus members of the National Party 11 caucus votes needed to win
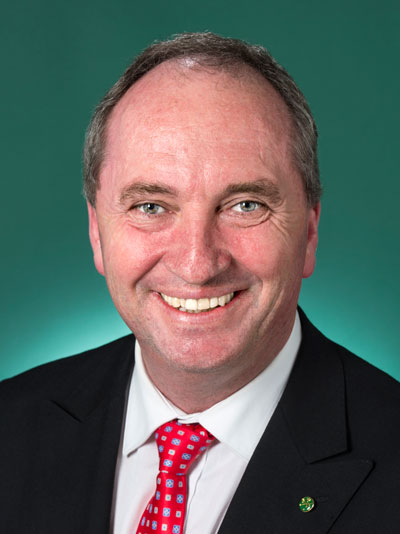

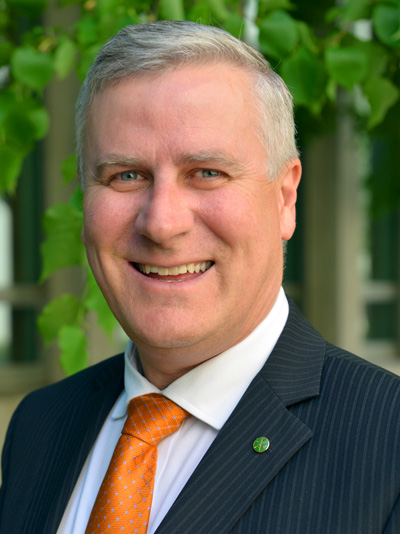
Candidate	Barnaby Joyce	Michael McCormack
Caucus vote	≥11 (Note: The National Party does not release the results of their internal elections.)	<11
Leader before election
Michael McCormack
Elected Leader
Barnaby Joyce

A leadership spill for the federal leadership of the National Party of Australia was held on 21 June 2021, and was called by the Senator for Queensland, Matt Canavan. Following the spill in the regularly scheduled party room meeting, the incumbent Deputy Prime Minister and Nationals leader Michael McCormack was defeated by his predecessor Barnaby Joyce, who assumed the former's position as leader and Deputy Prime Minister.

The Nationals do not officially release the results of party leadership elections.

The spill was called amid reports that Joyce was considering a challenge against McCormack for the second time in two years. The previous leadership spill was held in February 2020 and Joyce was unsuccessful.

There was no spill for the deputy leadership position, which continued to be held by David Littleproud.

== Background ==
In the parliamentary sitting week prior to the leadership spill, Prime Minister and Liberal Party leader Scott Morrison was overseas attending the G7 summit in the United Kingdom. Therefore, McCormack, as his capacity as Deputy Prime Minister, was the acting Prime Minister for the week. McCormack was criticised for his performance during Question Time, when he referred most questions directed to him onto other ministers.

Additionally, while attending the G7, Morrison said he understood that "the world was moving to net zero emissions and a new energy economy was coming". He was using his experience in the G7 to lay the groundwork for adopting a net zero emissions target by 2050. However, this was opposed by some National Party members including Resources Minister Keith Pitt. They complained that an agreement from the National Party has not been sought, and also argued that adopting a net zero emissions target would "absolutely cause damage to industries in regional communities and was not government policy". McCormack was criticised for not "extracting enough from the Prime Minister" in relation to the net zero emissions target. He was also criticised for lacking "cut-through and had not established enough of a brand differentiation to the Liberal Party".

== Results ==
Matt Canavan, Senator for Queensland and a known supporter of Barnaby Joyce, moved a spill motion against McCormack, in which the latter lost. McCormack and Joyce stood for the subsequent leadership contest. Deputy party leader David Littleproud later admitted that if McCormack had not stood for the contest, he would have stood up for the contest against Joyce.

== Endorsements ==
=== Michael McCormack ===
List of Michael McCormack endorsements

Confirmed

- Darren Chester, MP for Gippsland
- Mark Coulton, MP for Parkes

Reported

- Keith Pitt, MP for Hinkler
- Kevin Hogan, MP for Page
- Pat Conaghan, MP for Cowper
- Michelle Landry, MP for Capricornia
- Anne Webster, MP for Mallee
- Damian Drum, MP for Nicholls

=== Barnaby Joyce ===
List of Barnaby Joyce endorsements

Confirmed

- Bridget McKenzie, Senator for Victoria
- Matt Canavan, Senator for Queensland
- Ken O'Dowd, MP for Flynn
- David Gillespie, MP for Lyne

Reported

- David Littleproud, MP for Maranoa
- George Christensen, MP for Dawson
- Llew O'Brien, MP for Wide Bay
- Andrew Gee, MP for Calare
- Perin Davey, Senator for New South Wales
- Susan McDonald, Senator for Queensland
- Sam McMahon, Senator for the Northern Territory

== Aftermath ==
=== Question Time ===
On the day of the spill, Morrison was already back in Australia and quarantining in The Lodge for COVID-19. While Morrison could attend that day's Question Time via video conference, the Deputy Prime Minister would physically sit in the Prime Minister's chair in the House of Representatives during Question Time. Joyce was due to be sworn in as the next Deputy Prime Minister the following day. Therefore, McCormack, despite ousted as party leader, was still the Deputy Prime Minister and sat in the Prime Minister's chair for Question Time that day.

=== Net Zeros Emission Target by 2050 ===
After the spill, Joyce was asked by the media if he would oppose Morrison's plan to adopt a net zero emissions target by 2050. Joyce responded that the matter would be discussed in the party room and said that he would be guided by the party room. He claimed that whatever decision would not be "Barnaby policy" but "Nationals' policy", which he would "advocate for".

=== Murray–Darling Basin Plan ===
On 23 June 2021, two days after the spill, Nationals senators sought to amend the legislation introduced by the Liberal Party and Coalition cabinet ministers in relation to the Murray–Darling Basin Plan. None of the senators were cabinet ministers, and all reportedly voted for Joyce in the spill. The senators proposed that 450 gigalitres of water should not be required by legislation to be returned to the environment, that the Commonwealth not be allowed to buy back any more water rights from irrigators, and that the deadline for water-saving projects be extended "to 2024 and beyond", and new projects considered. The amendments were eventually defeated in the Senate that night, with the Greens, Labor and the Liberals voting against them. Labor and the Greens claimed this was a result of a change in the Nationals leadership. The following day, Nationals lower house MP Damian Drum attempted to introduce an identical amendment in the House of Representatives. He later withdrew the amendment, as Joyce, as a cabinet minister, would be forced to vote along with the government and oppose his own party policy.

The amendments were also criticised by South Australians including the South Australian Liberal state government.

=== Reactions by female National Party members ===
Joyce's ascension as federal party leader was not supported by some female Nationals federal and state MPs. Federal Nationals lower house MPs Michelle Landry and Anne Webster raised concerns that women would not be happy at Joyce becoming leader. The WA opposition leader and WA Nationals leader Mia Davies said it was "very disappointing" to see Joyce return as leader of federal Nationals, while Victoria Nationals deputy leader Steph Ryan said that Joyce's past actions "did not make him eligible for the leadership".

=== Cabinet reshuffle ===
In the subsequent ministerial reshuffle the following week, McCormack and his supporters Mark Coulton and Darren Chester were demoted to the backbench, while Joyce's supporters Bridget McKenzie and Andrew Gee were promoted to the cabinet. David Gillespie, also a supporter of Joyce, was promoted to the outer ministry. Resources and water minister Keith Pitt, who introduced the government's Murray–Darling Basin Plan legislation, was demoted from the cabinet to the outer ministry.
