= Anne Ruston =

Australian politician (born 1963)

Senator the Honourable Anne Ruston
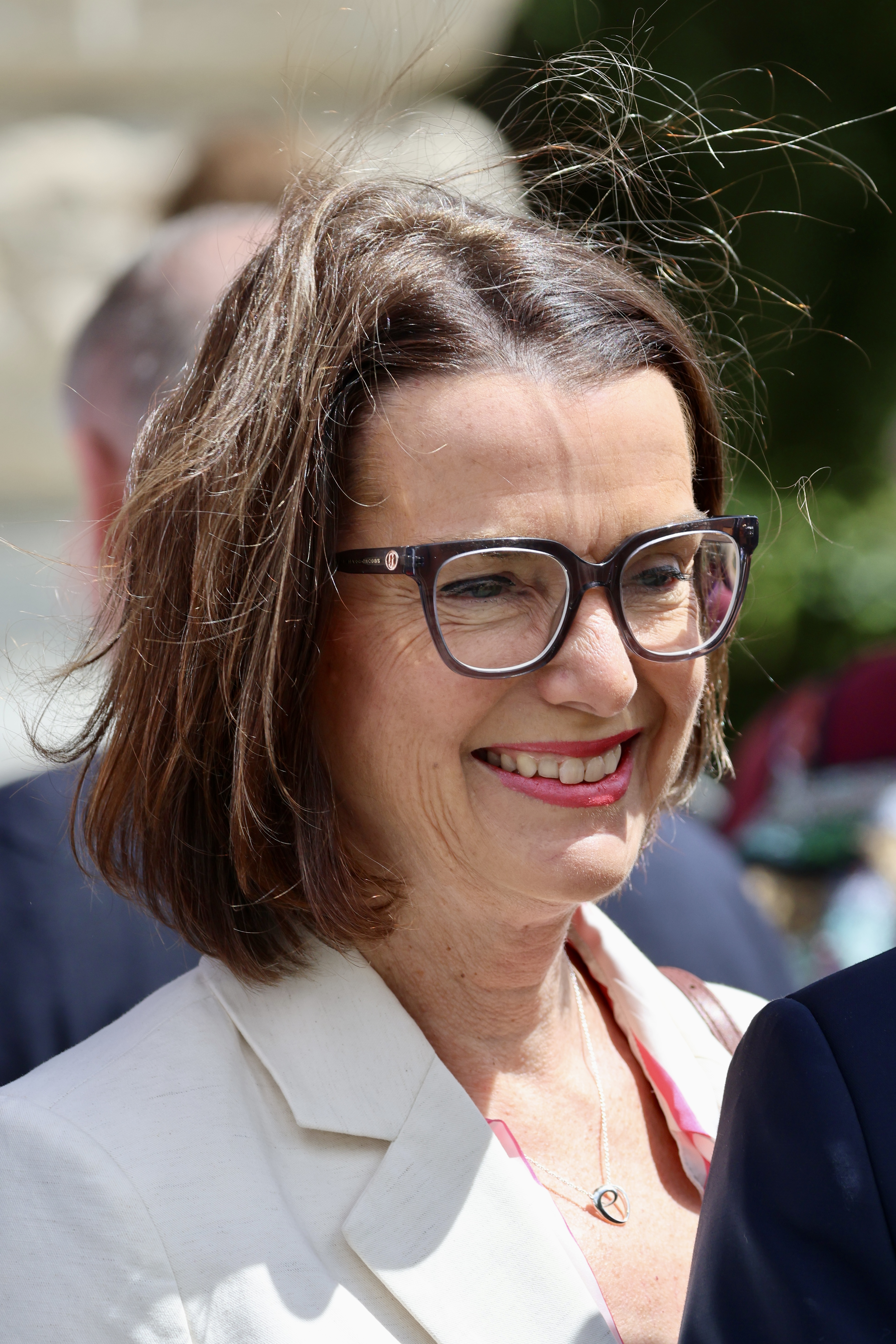
- Ruston in 2025

Deputy Leader of the Opposition in the Senate
- Incumbent
- Assumed office 25 January 2025
- Leader: Michaelia Cash
- Preceded by: Michaelia Cash

Shadow Minister for Health and Aged Care
- Incumbent
- Assumed office 5 June 2022
- Leader: Peter Dutton; Sussan Ley; Angus Taylor
- Preceded by: Mark Butler (as Shadow Minister for Health and Ageing)

Manager of Opposition Business in the Senate
- In office 5 June 2022 – 25 January 2025
- Leader: Simon Birmingham
- Preceded by: Katy Gallagher
- Succeeded by: Jonathon Duniam

Shadow Minister for Agriculture, Fisheries and Forestry
- Acting
- In office 30 January 2026 – 13 February 2026
- Leader: Sussan Ley
- Preceded by: David Littleproud
- Succeeded by: David Littleproud

Shadow Minister for Disability and the National Disability Insurance Scheme
- In office 28 May 2025 – 13 February 2026
- Leader: Sussan Ley
- Preceded by: Michael Sukkar (as Shadow Minister for the National Disability Insurance Scheme)
- Succeeded by: Melissa McIntosh (as Shadow Minister for the National Disability Insurance Scheme)

Shadow Minister for Sport
- In office 5 June 2022 – 13 February 2026
- Leader: Peter Dutton; Sussan Ley
- Preceded by: Don Farrell (as Shadow Minister for Sport and Tourism)
- Succeeded by: Angie Bell

Manager of Government Business in the Senate
- In office 29 May 2019 – 23 May 2022
- Prime Minister: Scott Morrison
- Leader: Mathias Cormann; Simon Birmingham
- Preceded by: Mitch Fifield
- Succeeded by: Katy Gallagher
- Acting
- In office 23 August 2018 – 28 August 2018
- Prime Minister: Malcolm Turnbull
- Leader: Simon Birmingham (acting)
- Preceded by: Simon Birmingham
- Succeeded by: Mitch Fifield

Minister for Families and Social Services
- In office 29 May 2019 – 23 May 2022
- Prime Minister: Scott Morrison
- Preceded by: Paul Fletcher
- Succeeded by: Amanda Rishworth (as Minister for Social Services)

Assistant Minister for International Development and the Pacific
- In office 28 August 2018 – 26 May 2019
- Prime Minister: Scott Morrison
- Preceded by: Concetta Fierravanti-Wells
- Succeeded by: Alex Hawke

Assistant Minister for Agriculture and Water Resources
- In office 21 September 2015 – 28 August 2018
- Prime Minister: Malcolm Turnbull
- Preceded by: Richard Colbeck (as Parliamentary-Secretary to the Minister for Agriculture)
- Succeeded by: Richard Colbeck

Senator for South Australia
- Incumbent
- Assumed office 5 September 2012
- Preceded by: Mary Jo Fisher

Personal details
- Born: 10 June 1963 (age 63) Renmark, South Australia, Australia
- Party: Liberal
- Education: University of Southern Queensland
- Occupation: Chief executive rose-grower

Anne Sowerby Ruston (born 10 June 1963) is an Australian politician who served as Minister for Families and Social Services in the Morrison government from 2019 to 2022. She has been a Senator for South Australia since 2012.

Before entering politics Ruston was a commercial rose-grower and chief executive of the National Wine Centre. She was appointed to the Senate to fill a casual vacancy caused by the resignation of Mary Jo Fisher. Ruston served as Assistant Minister for Agriculture and Water Resources in the Turnbull government from 2015 to 2018 and as Assistant Minister for International Development and the Pacific in the Morrison government from 2018 to 2019. She was elevated to cabinet following the 2019 election.

== Early life ==
Ruston was born on 10 June 1963 in Renmark, South Australia. She went to Renmark High School where she was a school friend of future Chief of Army Rick Burr. She holds the degree of Bachelor of Business from the University of Southern Queensland.

== Career ==
In 1987, Ruston began working as an electorate officer for state Liberal MP Peter Arnold. She joined the staff of state tourism minister Graham Ingerson in 1993 as a tourism policy adviser, and in 1996 was appointed as an executive officer at the Wine and Tourism Council. Her appointment was controversial as Ingerson was accused by the state opposition of interfering in the selection process in her favour.

Ruston was closely involved with the creation of the National Wine Centre of Australia, initially as project director and then as the centre's inaugural CEO. It was publicly announced by Premier John Olsen in 1998 as a centre for wine tourism and education, as well as office space for various wine industry groups. Ruston oversaw the construction phase of the centre, announcing three months prior to its opening in 2001 that she would not renew her contract. In 2000 she and the centre's chairman Rick Allert were called before a parliamentary committee over possible breaches of procurement guidelines. By the time of her departure the centre was employing over 100 people, but was reportedly struggling to break even and required a bailout from the state government. Its financial difficulties were attributed to a decline in air travel following the September 11 attacks and the collapse of Ansett Australia. However, independent MP Peter Lewis stated that the business plan approved by Ruston and Allert overstated likely visitor numbers.

In 2003, Ruston and her husband purchased Ruston's Roses, a commercial rose-growing property in Renmark established by her uncle David Ruston in 1948. He was the first Australian to serve as president of the World Federation of Rose Societies. At the time of purchase it reportedly contained 50,000 rose bushes of 4,000 varieties and over 700 varieties of iris, spread over 11 hectares (27 acres). However, as a result of the Millennium drought she had to suspend commercial growing for three years, and the gardens subsequently evolved into "primarily a retail-tourism business" with the addition of a tourism centre, function rooms and cafe. She was managing director until her appointment to the Senate in 2012, after which she remained as a co-owner.

== Politics ==
Ruston became a vice-president of the Liberal Party of Australia (South Australian Division) in 2011. In May 2012 she won preselection in third place on the party's Senate ticket for the next federal election, a position seen as "unsafe" due to the candidacy of independent senator Nick Xenophon. However, incumbent senator Mary Jo Fisher resigned the following month and Ruston was chosen instead for the resulting casual vacancy, receiving support from the party's moderate faction in what The Australian described as a "factional brawl". She was formally appointed by a joint sitting of the Parliament of South Australia on 5 September 2012.

Ruston was a deputy whip from September 2014 to May 2016. She became Assistant Minister for Agriculture and Water Resources in the First Turnbull Ministry in September 2015. During the August 2018 Liberal leadership spills, she served as Manager of Government Business in the Senate for five days. She was subsequently appointed Assistant Minister for International Development and the Pacific in the First Morrison Ministry.

Following the 2019 election, Ruston was elevated to the Cabinet and was appointed Minister for Families and Social Services in the Second Morrison Ministry. She was additionally reappointed as Manager of Government Business in the Senate. In March 2021 she was also made Minister for Women's Safety, a new position.

== Political positions ==
Ruston is a member of the Moderate faction of the Liberal Party.

In 2017, when Cory Bernardi moved a motion to ban sex-selective abortion, Ruston was one of the ten senators who voted in favour. The motion was defeated by a vote of 10–36.

== Personal life ==
Ruston is married to Richard Fewster and they have a son.

Parliament of Australia
Preceded by Mary Jo Fisher	Senator for South Australia; 2012–present	Incumbent
Political offices
Preceded by Paul Fletcher	Minister for Families and Social Services; 2019–2022	Succeeded by Amanda Rishworth as Minister for Social Services
Preceded by Concetta Fierravanti-Wells as Minister for International Development and the Pacific	Assistant Minister for International Development and the Pacific; 2018–2019	Succeeded by Alex Hawke as Minister for International Development and the Pacific
New ministerial post	Assistant Minister for Agriculture and Water Resources; 2015–2018	Succeeded by Richard Colbeck
