= Nita Green =

Australian lawyer and politician

Senator the Honourable Nita Green
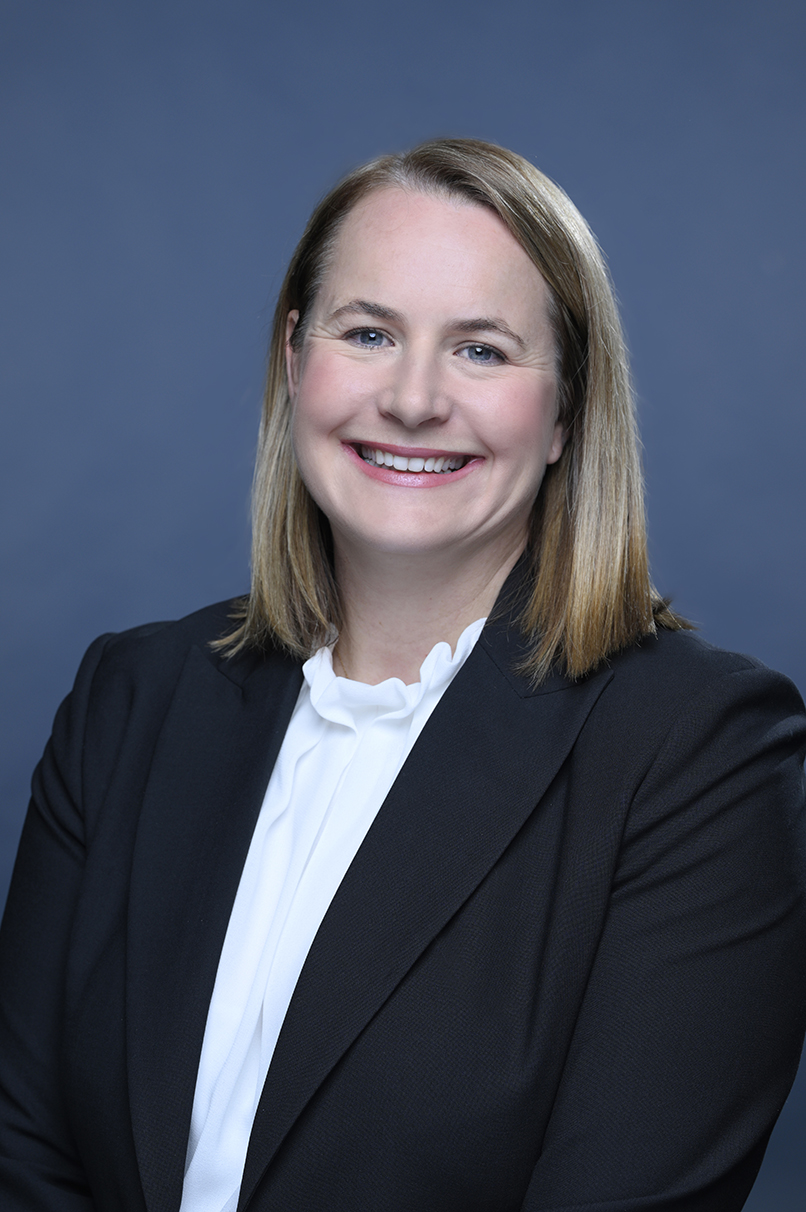

Assistant Minister for Northern Australia
- Incumbent
- Assumed office 13 May 2025
- Prime Minister: Anthony Albanese
- Preceded by: Position established

Assistant Minister for Tourism
- Incumbent
- Assumed office 13 May 2025
- Prime Minister: Anthony Albanese
- Preceded by: Position established

Assistant Minister for Pacific Island Affairs
- Incumbent
- Assumed office 13 May 2025
- Prime Minister: Anthony Albanese
- Preceded by: Position established

Special Envoy for the Great Barrier Reef
- In office 1 June 2022 – 13 May 2025
- Prime Minister: Anthony Albanese
- Preceded by: Position established
- Succeeded by: Position abolished

Senator for Queensland
- Incumbent
- Assumed office 1 July 2019

Personal details
- Born: 23 June 1983 (age 43) Camperdown, New South Wales, Australia
- Party: Labor
- Spouse: Lacey
- Children: 1
- Education: University of Wollongong; University of Canberra
- Occupation: Lawyer, trade unionist
- Website: www.nitagreen.com.au

Nita Louise Green (born 23 June 1983) is an Australian politician who was elected as a Senator for Queensland at the 2019 federal election. She is a member of the Australian Labor Party (ALP).

== Early life ==
Green was born in Camperdown, New South Wales. She was raised by a single mother who worked as a nurse. Her mother was born in the United States and arrived in Australia at the age of nine. She holds the degrees of Bachelor of Creative Arts from the University of Wollongong and Juris Doctor from the University of Canberra. While at university she worked in the retail and hospitality sectors.

== Career ==
After being admitted as a solicitor in 2015, Green worked as an employment lawyer for the law firm Maurice Blackburn. In 2017, she was the Queensland field director for Australian Marriage Equality during the Australian Marriage Law Postal Survey. She subsequently became an organiser for the Australian Manufacturing Workers' Union, and also worked as a staffer for Senator Murray Watt.

== Politics ==
In August 2018, Green won preselection for Labor's Senate ticket in Queensland, as the representative of the Labor Left faction. She was living on the Gold Coast at the time of her preselection, but later in the year she and her wife relocated to Cairns so that her party would have a senator based in Far North Queensland. She was elected to the Senate at the 2019 federal election in first position on the ALP ticket.

Green is a leader of the LGBTQ group Rainbow Labor. She is an advocate for transgender rights in sport, and has said that political and media grandstanding on such debates are hurtful for LGBT youth.

On 1 June 2022, Green was appointed as Special Envoy for the Great Barrier Reef by Prime Minister Anthony Albanese.

Green chaired the Commission of Inquiry into Antisemitism at Australian Universities Bill 2024 of the Senate Legal and Constitutional Affairs Legislation Committee, as part of their inquiry on antisemitism in Australian universities in 2024.

Following the re-election of the Albanese government in the 2025 federal election, Green was appointed as Assistant Minister for Tourism and Assistant Minister for Pacific Island Affairs, both of which are part of the Department of Foreign Affairs and Trade, and Assistant Minister for Northern Australia, which is in the Department of Infrastructure, Transport, Regional Development, Communications, Sport and the Arts.
