= Second Morrison ministry =

Australian government ministry led by Scott Morrison

- 72nd ministry of Australia

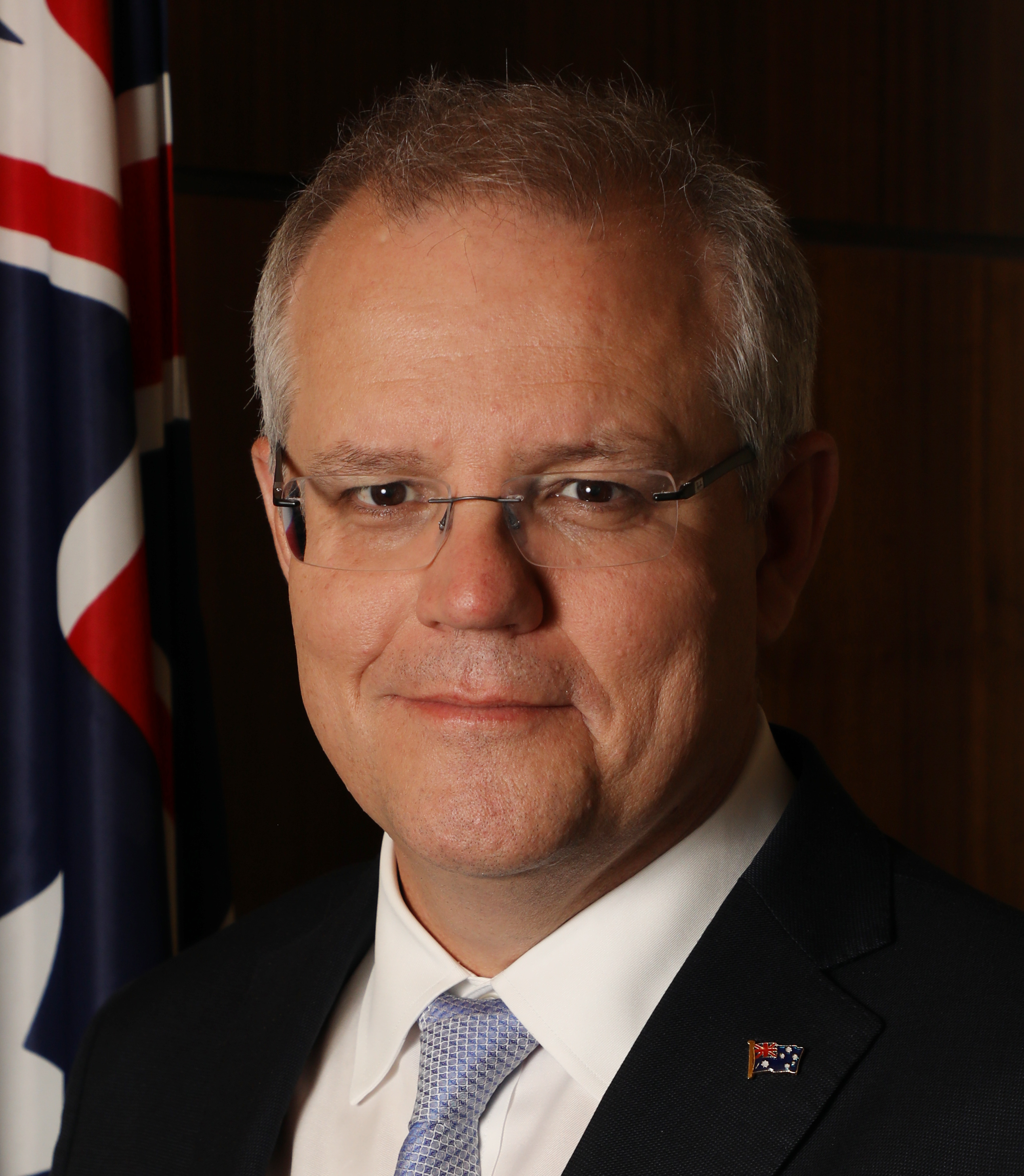
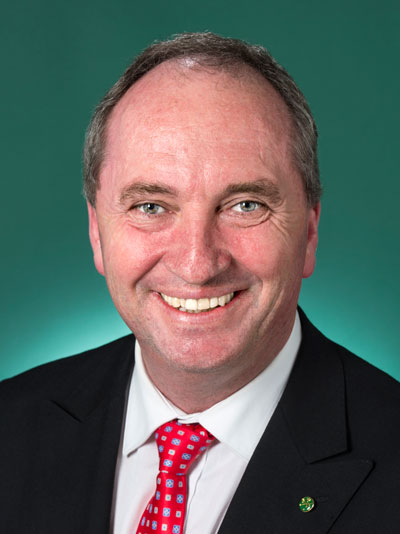
- Scott Morrison Barnaby Joyce
- Date formed: 29 May 2019
- Date dissolved: 23 May 2022

People and organisations
- Monarch: Elizabeth II
- Governor-General: Sir Peter Cosgrove; David Hurley
- Prime Minister: Scott Morrison
- Deputy Prime Minister: Michael McCormack; Barnaby Joyce
- No. of ministers: 30
- Member party: Liberal–National coalition
- Status in legislature: Coalition minority government
- Opposition cabinet: Albanese shadow ministry
- Opposition party: Labor
- Opposition leader: Anthony Albanese

History
- Election: 18 May 2019
- Outgoing election: 21 May 2022
- Legislature term: 46th
- Predecessor: First Morrison ministry
- Successor: First Albanese ministry

The second Morrison ministry (Liberal–National Coalition) was the 72nd ministry of the Australian Government. It was led by Prime Minister Scott Morrison. The second Morrison ministry succeeded the first Morrison ministry following the 2019 Australian federal election. The ministry was announced on 26 May 2019 and was sworn in on 29 May. Following the Coalition's defeat at the 2022 election, the ministry was succeeded by the first Albanese ministry on 23 May 2022.

== Final arrangement ==
On 19 September 2021, industrial, science and technology minister Christian Porter resigned from the cabinet after he was criticised for accepting an anonymous donation from a blind trust to fund his defamation claim against ABC and reporter Louise Milligan for publishing his rape allegation. Energy and emissions reduction minister Angus Taylor took over Porter's portfolios on an acting basis.

In a ministerial reshuffle on 8 October 2021, Taylor gained the industry portfolio, while defence industry minister Melissa Price gained the science and technology portfolio, with both retaining their own portfolios. Alex Hawke was promoted to the cabinet while retaining his immigration portfolio. Ben Morton was promoted to the ministry and was appointed the Special Minister of State and the Public Service Minister, while continuing to assist the Prime Minister and Cabinet. Tim Wilson was appointed the Assistant Minister Assisting the Minister for Industry, Energy and Emissions Reduction.

On 25 October 2021, resources and water minister Keith Pitt was reinstated to the cabinet, after previously being demoted to the outer ministry in July 2021.

On 2 December 2021, education minister Alan Tudge stood down from the cabinet while allegations of his bullying and affair with his former press secretary were being investigated. On 4 March 2022, while the review cleared Tudge of breaking any rules, Tudge decided not to return to the cabinet and resigned. Stuart Robert was the acting Education Minister during Tudge's leave and after Tudge stood down.

=== Cabinet ===
Party	Minister	Portrait	Portfolio
Liberal	Scott Morrison MP		Prime Minister; Minister for the Public Service; Minister of Industry, Science and Energy; Minister for Resources; Minister for Home Affairs; Minister for Finance; Minister for Health and Aged Care; Treasurer; Leader of the Liberal Party
National	Barnaby Joyce MP		Deputy Prime Minister; Minister for Infrastructure, Transport and Regional Development; Leader of the National Party
Liberal	Josh Frydenberg MP		Treasurer; Deputy Leader of the Liberal Party
Liberal	Senator Simon Birmingham		Minister for Finance; Vice-President of the Executive Council; Leader of the Government in the Senate
National (LNP)	David Littleproud MP		Minister for Agriculture and Northern Australia; Deputy Leader of the National Party
Liberal	Senator Marise Payne		Minister for Foreign Affairs; Minister for Women
Liberal (LNP)	Peter Dutton MP		Minister for Defence; Leader of the House
Liberal	Senator Michaelia Cash		Attorney-General; Minister for Industrial Relations; Deputy Leader of the Government in the Senate
Liberal	Greg Hunt MP		Minister for Health and Aged Care
Liberal	Dan Tehan MP		Minister for Trade, Tourism and Investment
Liberal	Paul Fletcher MP		Minister for Communications, Urban Infrastructure, Cities and the Arts
Liberal	Senator Anne Ruston		Minister for Families and Social Services; Minister for Women's Safety; Manager of Government Business in the Senate
Liberal (LNP)	Karen Andrews MP		Minister for Home Affairs
Liberal	Angus Taylor MP		Minister for Industry, Energy and Emissions Reduction
Liberal (LNP)	Stuart Robert MP		Minister for Employment, Workforce, Skills, Small and Family Business; Minister for Education and Youth (acting) (since 2 December 2021)
Liberal	Senator Linda Reynolds		Minister for Government Services; Minister for the National Disability Insurance Scheme
Liberal	Sussan Ley MP		Minister for the Environment
Liberal	Ken Wyatt MP		Minister for Indigenous Australians
Liberal	Melissa Price MP		Minister for Defence Industry; Minister for Science and Technology
Liberal	Alan Tudge MP		Minister for Education and Youth (on leave from 2 December 2021. Resigned 4 March 2022.)
National	Senator Bridget McKenzie		Minister for Emergency Management and National Recovery and Resilience; Minister for Regionalisation, Regional Communications and Regional Education
National	Andrew Gee MP		Minister for Veterans' Affairs; Minister for Defence Personnel
Liberal	Alex Hawke MP		Minister for Immigration, Citizenship, Migrant Services and Multicultural Affairs
National (LNP)	Keith Pitt MP		Minister for Resources and Water

=== Outer ministry ===
Party	Minister	State/territory	Portfolio
Liberal	Ben Morton MP	WA	Special Minister of State; Minister for the Public Service; Minister Assisting the Prime Minister and Cabinet
Liberal	Michael Sukkar MP	Vic	Assistant Treasurer; Minister for Housing; Minister for Homelessness, Social and Community Housing
Liberal	Senator Jane Hume	Vic	Minister for Superannuation, Financial Services and the Digital Economy; Minister for Women's Economic Security
Liberal	Senator Zed Seselja	ACT	Minister for International Development and the Pacific
National	David Gillespie MP	NSW	Minister for Regional Health; Minister Assisting the Minister for Trade and Investment; Deputy Leader of the House
Liberal	Senator Richard Colbeck	Tas	Minister for Senior Australians and Aged Care Services; Minister for Sport

=== Assistant ministry ===
Party	Minister	State/territory	Portfolio
Liberal	David Coleman MP	NSW	Assistant Minister to the Prime Minister for Mental Health and Suicide Prevention
Liberal (LNP)	Scott Buchholz MP	Qld	Assistant Minister for Road Safety and Freight Transport
National	Kevin Hogan MP	NSW	Assistant Minister to the Deputy Prime Minister; Assistant Minister for Local Government
Liberal	Nola Marino MP	WA	Assistant Minister for Regional Development and Territories
Liberal (LNP)	Senator Amanda Stoker	Qld	Assistant Minister to the Attorney-General; Assistant Minister for Women; Assistant Minister for Industrial Relations
Liberal	Senator Jonathon Duniam	Tas	Assistant Minister for Forestry and Fisheries; Assistant Minister for Industry Development
Liberal	Jason Wood MP	Vic	Assistant Minister for Customs, Community Safety and Multicultural Affairs
Liberal (LNP)	Trevor Evans MP	Qld	Assistant Minister for Waste Reduction and Environmental Management
National (LNP)	Michelle Landry MP	Qld	Assistant Minister for Children and Families
Liberal (LNP)	Luke Howarth MP	Qld	Assistant Minister for Youth and Employment Services
Liberal	Andrew Hastie MP	WA	Assistant Minister for Defence
Liberal	Tim Wilson MP	Vic	Assistant Minister for Industry, Energy and Emissions Reduction

=== Party breakdown ===
==== Cabinet ====
Party breakdown of cabinet ministers (since 25 October 2021):

- Liberal (Note: Includes three LNP ministers sitting in Liberal party room.)
- National (Note: Includes two LNP ministers sitting in National party room.)
19
5

==== Entire ministry ====
Party breakdown of entire ministry:

- Liberal (Note: Includes seven LNP ministers sitting in Liberal party room.)
- National (Note: Includes three LNP ministers sitting in National party room.)
34
8

== Fifth arrangement ==
On 21 June 2021, Deputy Prime Minister and Nationals leader Michael McCormack was replaced by former leader Barnaby Joyce in a leadership spill, resulting in a ministerial reshuffle of National Party members. Joyce was sworn in as Deputy Prime Minister and Minister for Infrastructure, Transport and Regional Development on 22 June 2021, taking over from McCormack. Details of the reshuffle of the other National party members were announced on 27 June 2021. The new ministerial arrangement took effect on 2 July 2021.

McCormack was not given a ministerial portfolio and moved to the backbench. His supporters Mark Coulton and Darren Chester were also stripped of their ministerial portfolios and moved to the backbench. Joyce's supporters Bridget McKenzie and Andrew Gee were promoted to the cabinet, with McKenzie returning to the cabinet since her resignation in February 2020. McKenzie took over the emergency management portfolio (including drought) from deputy party leader David Littleproud, while also gaining the regionalisation (formerly decentralisation), regional communications and regional education from Coulton and Gee. Gee gained the veterans' affairs and defence personnel from Chester. Littleproud retained agriculture and gained the Northern Australia portfolio from Keith Pitt, who retained resources and water but was demoted to the outer ministry. David Gillespie, also a supporter of Joyce, was promoted to the outer ministry and gained the regional health portfolio from Coulton. Gillespie was previously an assistant minister in the Second Turnbull ministry.

As for the assistant ministry, Kevin Hogan became the Assistant Minister for Local Government in addition to his existing portfolios, while Michelle Landry remained Assistant Minister for Children Families, but lost her role as Assistant Minister for Northern Australia.

=== Cabinet ===
Party	Minister	Portrait	Portfolio
Liberal	Scott Morrison MP		Prime Minister; Minister for the Public Service; Minister of Industry, Science and Energy; Minister for Resources; Minister for Home Affairs; Minister for Finance; Minister for Health and Aged Care; Treasurer of Australia; Leader of the Liberal Party
National	Barnaby Joyce MP		Deputy Prime Minister; Leader of the National Party; Minister for Infrastructure, Transport and Regional Development
Liberal	Josh Frydenberg MP		Treasurer; Deputy Leader of the Liberal Party
National (LNP)	David Littleproud MP		Minister for Agriculture and Northern Australia; Deputy Leader of the National Party
Liberal	Senator Simon Birmingham		Minister for Finance; Vice-President of the Executive Council; Leader of the Government in the Senate
Liberal	Senator Michaelia Cash		Attorney-General; Minister for Industrial Relations; Deputy Leader of the Government in the Senate
Liberal	Senator Marise Payne		Minister for Foreign Affairs; Minister for Women
Liberal (LNP)	Karen Andrews MP		Minister for Home Affairs
Liberal (LNP)	Peter Dutton MP		Minister for Defence; Leader of the House
Liberal	Alan Tudge MP		Minister for Education and Youth
Liberal	Greg Hunt MP		Minister for Health and Aged Care
Liberal	Paul Fletcher MP		Minister for Communications, Urban Infrastructure, Cities and the Arts
National	Senator Bridget McKenzie		Minister for Emergency Management and National Recovery and Resilience; Minister for Regionalisation, Regional Communications and Regional Education
Liberal	Dan Tehan MP		Minister for Trade, Tourism and Investment
Liberal (LNP)	Stuart Robert MP		Minister for Employment, Workforce, Skills, Small and Family Business
Liberal	Christian Porter MP		Minister for Industry, Science and Technology
Liberal	Angus Taylor MP		Minister for Energy and Emissions Reduction
Liberal	Sussan Ley MP		Minister for the Environment
Liberal	Senator Anne Ruston		Minister for Families and Social Services; Minister for Women's Safety; Manager of Government Business in the Senate
Liberal	Ken Wyatt MP		Minister for Indigenous Australians
Liberal	Senator Linda Reynolds		Minister for the National Disability Insurance Scheme; Minister for Government Services
National	Andrew Gee MP		Minister for Veterans' Affairs; Minister for Defence Personnel
Liberal	Melissa Price MP		Minister for Defence Industry

=== Outer ministry ===
Party	Minister	State/territory	Portfolio
National	David Gillespie MP	NSW	Minister for Regional Health; Deputy Leader of the House
National (LNP)	Keith Pitt MP	Qld	Minister for Resources and Water
Liberal	Michael Sukkar MP	Vic	Assistant Treasurer; Minister for Housing; Minister for Homelessness, Social and Community Housing
Liberal	Senator Jane Hume	Vic	Minister for Superannuation, Financial Services and the Digital Economy; Minister for Women's Economic Security
Liberal	Senator Zed Seselja	ACT	Minister for International Development and the Pacific
Liberal	Senator Richard Colbeck	Tas	Minister for Senior Australians and Aged Care Services; Minister for Sport
Liberal	Alex Hawke MP	NSW	Minister for Immigration, Citizenship, Migrant Services and Multicultural Affairs

=== Assistant ministry ===
Party	Minister	State/territory	Portfolio
Liberal	Ben Morton MP	WA	Assistant Minister to the Prime Minister and Cabinet; Assistant Minister to the Minister for the Public Service; Assistant Minister for Electoral Matters
Liberal	David Coleman MP	NSW	Assistant Minister to the Prime Minister for Mental Health and Suicide Prevention
Liberal (LNP)	Scott Buchholz MP	Qld	Assistant Minister for Road Safety and Freight Transport
National	Kevin Hogan MP	NSW	Assistant Minister to the Deputy Prime Minister; Assistant Minister for Local Government
Liberal	Nola Marino MP	WA	Assistant Minister for Regional Development and Territories
Liberal (LNP)	Senator Amanda Stoker	Qld	Assistant Minister to the Attorney-General; Assistant Minister for Women; Assistant Minister for Industrial Relations
Liberal	Senator Jonathon Duniam	Tas	Assistant Minister for Forestry and Fisheries; Assistant Minister for Industry Development
Liberal	Jason Wood MP	Vic	Assistant Minister for Customs, Community Safety and Multicultural Affairs
Liberal (LNP)	Trevor Evans MP	Qld	Assistant Minister for Waste Reduction and Environmental Management
National (LNP)	Michelle Landry MP	Qld	Assistant Minister for Children and Families
Liberal (LNP)	Luke Howarth MP	Qld	Assistant Minister for Youth and Employment Services
Liberal	Andrew Hastie MP	WA	Assistant Minister for Defence

=== Party breakdown ===
==== Cabinet ====
Party breakdown of cabinet ministers:

- Liberal (Note: Includes three LNP ministers sitting in Liberal party room.)
- National (Note: Includes one LNP minister sitting in National party room.)
19
4

==== Entire ministry ====
Party breakdown of entire ministry:

- Liberal (Note: Includes seven LNP ministers sitting in Liberal party room.)
- National (Note: Includes three LNP ministers sitting in National party room.)
34
8

== Fourth arrangement ==
Since February and early March 2021, Defence Minister Linda Reynolds and Attorney-General Christian Porter had been criticised for their words and actions during a series of scandals that plagued the Morrison government. Reynolds had been criticised for the mishandling of a rape allegation and complaint by her staffer Brittany Higgins in 2019, while Porter had been accused of raping a 16-year-old when he was 17 in 1988. Reynolds and Porter subsequently took medical leave from 24 February and 4 March respectively, after which, foreign affairs minister Marise Payne was acting defence minister on behalf of Reynolds and employment minister Michaelia Cash was the acting Attorney-General and acting industrial relations minister on behalf of Porter. Peter Dutton was acting Leader of the House on behalf of Porter.

In a ministerial reshuffle on 30 March 2021, Reynolds was demoted to government services and the NDIS, and Porter was demoted to industry and science. Dutton replaced Reynolds as Minister for Defence and officially replaced Porter as Leader of the House. Cash officially replaced Porter as Attorney-General and Minister for Industrial Relations. Karen Andrews took over Dutton's role as Minister for Home Affairs, and Stuart Robert took on Cash's role as employment minister.

There were also changes to other ministers who were not plagued by the scandals. Anne Ruston was appointed Minister for Women's Safety, in addition to her social services portfolio. Jane Hume was appointed Minister for Women's Economic Security, in addition to her superannuation portfolio. Amanda Stoker was appointed Assistant Minister for Women and Assistant Minister for Industrial Relations, in addition to her position as Assistant Attorney-General. Minister for Defence Industry Melissa Price retained her portfolio but returned to the Cabinet. Her promotion to Cabinet would allow the Cabinet to return to its previous record of seven women.

The reshuffle was aimed to "getting the right perspective" in the wake of the justice for women movement. There were no additions or removals of parliamentarians to the ministry.

=== Cabinet ===
Party	Minister	Portrait	Portfolio
Liberal	Scott Morrison MP		Prime Minister; Minister for the Public Service; Minister of Industry, Science and Energy; Minister for Resources; Minister for Home Affairs; Minister for Finance; Minister for Health and Aged Care; Treasurer of Australia; Leader of the Liberal Party
National	Michael McCormack MP		Deputy Prime Minister; Minister for Infrastructure, Transport and Regional Development; Leader of the National Party
Liberal	Josh Frydenberg MP		Treasurer; Deputy Leader of the Liberal Party
National (LNP)	David Littleproud MP		Minister for Agriculture, Drought and Emergency Management; Deputy Leader of the National Party
Liberal	Senator Simon Birmingham		Minister for Finance; Vice-President of the Executive Council; Leader of the Government in the Senate
Liberal	Senator Michaelia Cash		Attorney-General; Minister for Industrial Relations; Deputy Leader of the Government in the Senate
Liberal	Senator Marise Payne		Minister for Foreign Affairs; Minister for Women
Liberal (LNP)	Karen Andrews MP		Minister for Home Affairs
Liberal (LNP)	Peter Dutton MP		Minister for Defence; Leader of the House
Liberal	Alan Tudge MP		Minister for Education and Youth
Liberal	Greg Hunt MP		Minister for Health and Aged Care
Liberal	Paul Fletcher MP		Minister for Communications, Urban Infrastructure, Cities and the Arts
Liberal	Dan Tehan MP		Minister for Trade, Tourism and Investment
Liberal (LNP)	Stuart Robert MP		Minister for Employment, Workforce, Skills, Small and Family Business
Liberal	Christian Porter MP		Minister for Industry, Science and Technology
National (LNP)	Keith Pitt MP		Minister for Resources, Water and Northern Australia
Liberal	Angus Taylor MP		Minister for Energy and Emissions Reduction
Liberal	Sussan Ley MP		Minister for the Environment
Liberal	Senator Anne Ruston		Minister for Families and Social Services; Minister for Women's Safety; Manager of Government Business in the Senate
Liberal	Ken Wyatt MP		Minister for Indigenous Australians
Liberal	Senator Linda Reynolds		Minister for the National Disability Insurance Scheme; Minister for Government Services
National	Darren Chester MP		Minister for Veterans' Affairs; Minister for Defence Personnel; Deputy Leader of the House
Liberal	Melissa Price MP		Minister for Defence Industry

=== Outer ministry ===
Party	Minister	State/territory	Portfolio
National	Mark Coulton MP	NSW	Minister for Regional Health, Regional Communications and Local Government
National	Andrew Gee MP	NSW	Minister for Decentralisation and Regional Education; Minister Assisting the Minister for Trade and Investment
Liberal	Michael Sukkar MP	Vic	Assistant Treasurer; Minister for Housing; Minister for Homelessness, Social and Community Housing
Liberal	Senator Jane Hume	Vic	Minister for Superannuation, Financial Services and the Digital Economy; Minister for Women's Economic Security
Liberal	Senator Zed Seselja	ACT	Minister for International Development and the Pacific
Liberal	Senator Richard Colbeck	Tas	Minister for Senior Australians and Aged Care Services; Minister for Sport
Liberal	Alex Hawke MP	NSW	Minister for Immigration, Citizenship, Migrant Services and Multicultural Affairs

=== Assistant ministry ===
Party	Minister	State/territory	Portfolio
Liberal	Ben Morton MP	WA	Assistant Minister to the Prime Minister and Cabinet; Assistant Minister to the Minister for the Public Service; Assistant Minister for Electoral Matters
Liberal	David Coleman MP	NSW	Assistant Minister to the Prime Minister for Mental Health and Suicide Prevention
Liberal (LNP)	Scott Buchholz MP	Qld	Assistant Minister for Road Safety and Freight Transport
National	Kevin Hogan MP	NSW	Assistant Minister to the Deputy Prime Minister
Liberal	Nola Marino MP	WA	Assistant Minister for Regional Development and Territories
Liberal (LNP)	Senator Amanda Stoker	Qld	Assistant Minister to the Attorney-General; Assistant Minister for Women; Assistant Minister for Industrial Relations
Liberal	Senator Jonathon Duniam	Tas	Assistant Minister for Forestry and Fisheries; Assistant Minister for Industry Development
Liberal	Jason Wood MP	Vic	Assistant Minister for Customs, Community Safety and Multicultural Affairs
Liberal (LNP)	Trevor Evans MP	Qld	Assistant Minister for Waste Reduction and Environmental Management
National (LNP)	Michelle Landry MP	Qld	Assistant Minister for Children and Families; Assistant Minister for Northern Australia
Liberal (LNP)	Luke Howarth MP	Qld	Assistant Minister for Youth and Employment Services
Liberal	Andrew Hastie MP	WA	Assistant Minister for Defence

=== Party breakdown ===
==== Cabinet ====
Party breakdown of cabinet ministers:

- Liberal (Note: Includes three LNP ministers sitting in Liberal party room.)
- National (Note: Includes two LNP ministers sitting in National party room.)
19
4

==== Entire ministry ====
Party breakdown of entire ministry:

- Liberal (Note: Includes seven LNP ministers sitting in Liberal party room.)
- National (Note: Includes three LNP ministers sitting in National party room.)
34
8

== Third arrangement ==
Between March 2020 and May 2021, Scott Morrison was secretly appointed to five additional ministries: Department of Health (14 March 2020), Department of Finance (30 March 2020), Department of Industry, Science, Energy and Resources (15 April 2021), and the departments of Home affairs and Treasury (6 May 2021). Morrison said later that he hadn't used his additional powers, except in one instance in relation to a decision on the Pep-11 offshore gas exploration project.

A ministerial reshuffle was undertaken on 22 December 2020. Health Minister Greg Hunt was given the aged care portfolio in addition his existing health portfolio. The previous aged care minister, Richard Colbeck, remained as Minister for Senior Australians and Aged Care Services. Colbeck also retained the sports portfolio, but lost the youth portfolio to Alan Tudge. Tudge was appointed as Minister for Education and Youth, and his previous urban infrastructure portfolio was given to Communications and Arts Minister Paul Fletcher. The previous Education Minister Dan Tehan was appointed as Trade Minister, taking over from Simon Birmingham who became the Finance Minister two months prior. No additional parliamentarians were appointed to the Cabinet.

Zed Seselja and Jane Hume were promoted to the Outer Ministry, and Amanda Stoker and Andrew Hastie were new additions to the Assistant Ministry. Steve Irons stepped down from the Assistant Ministry to make way for Hastie. Immigration Minister David Coleman, who was on personal leave since December 2019, returned from leave but was demoted to an Assistant Minister.

=== Cabinet ===
Party	Minister	Portrait	Portfolio
Liberal	Scott Morrison MP		Prime Minister; Minister for the Public Service; Leader of the Liberal Party
National	Michael McCormack MP		Deputy Prime Minister; Minister for Infrastructure, Transport and Regional Development; Leader of the National Party
Liberal	Josh Frydenberg MP		Treasurer; Deputy Leader of the Liberal Party
National (LNP)	David Littleproud MP		Minister for Agriculture, Drought and Emergency Management; Deputy Leader of the National Party
Liberal	Senator Simon Birmingham		Minister for Finance; Vice-President of the Executive Council; Leader of the Government in the Senate
Liberal	Christian Porter MP		Attorney-General; Minister for Industrial Relations; Leader of the House
Liberal	Senator Marise Payne		Minister for Foreign Affairs; Minister for Women
Liberal (LNP)	Peter Dutton MP		Minister for Home Affairs
Liberal	Senator Linda Reynolds		Minister for Defence
Liberal	Alan Tudge MP		Minister for Education and Youth
Liberal	Greg Hunt MP		Minister for Health and Aged Care
Liberal	Paul Fletcher MP		Minister for Communications, Urban Infrastructure, Cities and the Arts
Liberal	Dan Tehan MP		Minister for Trade, Tourism and Investment
Liberal	Senator Michaelia Cash		Minister for Employment, Skills, Small and Family Business; Deputy Leader of the Government in the Senate
Liberal (LNP)	Karen Andrews MP		Minister for Industry, Science and Technology
National (LNP)	Keith Pitt MP		Minister for Resources, Water and Northern Australia
Liberal	Angus Taylor MP		Minister for Energy and Emissions Reduction
Liberal	Sussan Ley MP		Minister for the Environment
Liberal	Senator Anne Ruston		Minister for Families and Social Services; Manager of Government Business in the Senate
Liberal	Ken Wyatt MP		Minister for Indigenous Australians
Liberal (LNP)	Stuart Robert MP		Minister for the National Disability Insurance Scheme; Minister for Government Services
National	Darren Chester MP		Minister for Veterans' Affairs; Minister for Defence Personnel; Deputy Leader of the House

=== Outer ministry ===
Party	Minister	State/territory	Portfolio
National	Mark Coulton MP	NSW	Minister for Regional Health, Regional Communications and Local Government
National	Andrew Gee MP	NSW	Minister for Decentralisation and Regional Education; Minister Assisting the Minister for Trade and Investment
Liberal	Michael Sukkar MP	Vic	Assistant Treasurer; Minister for Housing; Minister for Homelessness, Social and Community Housing
Liberal	Senator Jane Hume	Vic	Minister for Superannuation, Financial Services and the Digital Economy
Liberal	Senator Zed Seselja	ACT	Minister for International Development and the Pacific
Liberal	Senator Richard Colbeck	Tas	Minister for Senior Australians and Aged Care Services; Minister for Sport
Liberal	Alex Hawke MP	NSW	Minister for Immigration, Citizenship, Migrant Services and Multicultural Affairs
Liberal	Melissa Price MP	WA	Minister for Defence Industry

=== Assistant ministry ===
Party	Minister	State/territory	Portfolio
Liberal	Ben Morton MP	WA	Assistant Minister to the Prime Minister and Cabinet; Assistant Minister to the Minister for the Public Service; Assistant Minister for Electoral Matters
Liberal	David Coleman MP	NSW	Assistant Minister to the Prime Minister for Mental Health and Suicide Prevention
Liberal (LNP)	Scott Buchholz MP	Qld	Assistant Minister for Road Safety and Freight Transport
National	Kevin Hogan MP	NSW	Assistant Minister to the Deputy Prime Minister
Liberal	Nola Marino MP	WA	Assistant Minister for Regional Development and Territories
Liberal (LNP)	Senator Amanda Stoker	Qld	Assistant Minister to the Attorney-General
Liberal	Senator Jonathon Duniam	Tas	Assistant Minister for Forestry and Fisheries; Assistant Minister for Industry Development
Liberal	Jason Wood MP	Vic	Assistant Minister for Customs, Community Safety and Multicultural Affairs
Liberal (LNP)	Trevor Evans MP	Qld	Assistant Minister for Waste Reduction and Environmental Management
National (LNP)	Michelle Landry MP	Qld	Assistant Minister for Children and Families; Assistant Minister for Northern Australia
Liberal (LNP)	Luke Howarth MP	Qld	Assistant Minister for Youth and Employment Services
Liberal	Andrew Hastie MP	WA	Assistant Minister for Defence

=== Party breakdown ===
==== Cabinet ====
Party breakdown of cabinet ministers:

- Liberal (Note: Includes three LNP ministers sitting in Liberal party room.)
- National (Note: Includes two LNP ministers sitting in National party room.)
18
4

==== Entire ministry ====
Party breakdown of entire ministry:

- Liberal (Note: Includes seven LNP ministers sitting in Liberal party room.)
- National (Note: Includes three LNP ministers sitting in National party room.)
34
8

== Second arrangement ==
Bridget McKenzie resigned as deputy Nationals leader and from the Cabinet on 2 February 2020 because of a sports grants scandal, while Matt Canavan resigned on 3 February 2020 because he backed former Nationals leader Barnaby Joyce in the 2020 Nationals leadership spill. Following the spill, David Littleproud was elected as deputy leader of the Nationals on 4 February 2020. The portfolios held by Nationals ministers and assistant ministers were reshuffled, effective 6 February 2020.

Littleproud took over the agriculture portfolio from McKenzie, retaining his drought and emergency management portfolios, and losing the water resources portfolio to Keith Pitt. Pitt, who was previously an assistant minister between 2016 and 2018, also took over resources and Northern Australia portfolio from Canavan. Darren Chester continued to hold the veteran affair's and defence personnel portfolios, which were moved from the outer ministry to the cabinet.

Mark Coulton's regional services portfolio was split up into regional health, regional communications and regional education, with Coulton retaining the first two as well as the local government portfolio. Andrew Gee was promoted to the outer ministry and took over the regional education and decentralisation portfolios and the post of Assistant Trade and Investment Minister from Coulton. Kevin Hogan was promoted to the assistant ministry and replaced Gee as Assistant Minister to the Deputy Prime Minister. Michelle Landry retained her portfolio and was additionally appointed Assistant Minister for Northern Australia.

The new ministers were sworn in on 6 February 2020. The portfolios of Liberal ministers were unchanged, and Alan Tudge continued to be acting Minister for Immigration, Citizenship, Migrant Services and Multicultural Affairs on behalf of David Coleman.

In October 2020, Mathias Cormann retired from federal politics. Simon Birmingham took over Cormann's roles as Leader of the Government in the Senate and Minister for Finance in addition to his own trade portfolio on 31 October 2020. Michaelia Cash became the Deputy Leader of the Government in the Senate. Despite the loss of one cabinet minister, Morrison opted not to make other ministerial changes at the time. The arrangement lasted until the reshuffle in December 2020.

=== Cabinet ===
Party	Minister	Portrait	Portfolio
Liberal	Scott Morrison MP		Prime Minister; Minister for the Public Service; Leader of the Liberal Party
National	Michael McCormack MP		Deputy Prime Minister; Minister for Infrastructure, Transport and Regional Development; Leader of the National Party
Liberal	Josh Frydenberg MP		Treasurer; Deputy Leader of the Liberal Party
Liberal	Senator Mathias Cormann (until 30 October 2020)		Minister for Finance (until 30 October 2020); Vice-President of the Executive Council (until 30 October 2020); Leader of the Government in the Senate (until 30 October 2020)
National (LNP)	David Littleproud MP		Minister for Agriculture, Drought and Emergency Management; Deputy Leader of the National Party
Liberal	Senator Simon Birmingham		Minister for Trade, Tourism and Investment; Minister for Finance (since 30 October 2020); Vice-President of the Executive Council (since 30 October 2020); Leader of the Government in the Senate (since 30 October 2020); Deputy Leader of the Government in the Senate (until 30 October 2020)
Liberal	Christian Porter MP		Attorney-General; Minister for Industrial Relations; Leader of the House
Liberal	Senator Marise Payne		Minister for Foreign Affairs; Minister for Women
Liberal (LNP)	Peter Dutton MP		Minister for Home Affairs
Liberal	Senator Linda Reynolds		Minister for Defence
Liberal	Alan Tudge MP		Minister for Population, Cities and Urban Infrastructure; Acting Minister for Immigration, Citizenship, Migrant Services and Multicultural Affairs
Liberal	Greg Hunt MP		Minister for Health; Minister Assisting the Prime Minister for the Public Service and Cabinet
Liberal	Paul Fletcher MP		Minister for Communications, Cyber Safety and the Arts
Liberal	Dan Tehan MP		Minister for Education
Liberal	Senator Michaelia Cash		Minister for Employment, Skills, Small and Family Business; Deputy Leader of the Government in the Senate (since 30 October 2020)
Liberal (LNP)	Karen Andrews MP		Minister for Industry, Science and Technology
National (LNP)	Keith Pitt MP		Minister for Resources, Water and Northern Australia
Liberal	Angus Taylor MP		Minister for Energy and Emissions Reduction
Liberal	Sussan Ley MP		Minister for the Environment
Liberal	Senator Anne Ruston		Minister for Families and Social Services; Manager of Government Business in the Senate
Liberal	Ken Wyatt MP		Minister for Indigenous Australians
Liberal (LNP)	Stuart Robert MP		Minister for the National Disability Insurance Scheme; Minister for Government Services
National	Darren Chester MP		Minister for Veterans' Affairs; Minister for Defence Personnel; Deputy Leader of the House

=== Outer ministry ===
Party	Minister	State/territory	Portfolio
National	Mark Coulton MP	NSW	Minister for Regional Health, Regional Communications and Local Government
Liberal	Michael Sukkar MP	Vic	Assistant Treasurer; Minister for Housing
Liberal	Alex Hawke MP	NSW	Minister for International Development and the Pacific; Assistant Defence Minister
Liberal	Senator Richard Colbeck	Tas	Minister for Aged Care and Senior Australians; Minister for Youth and Sport
Liberal	David Coleman MP	NSW	Minister for Immigration, Citizenship, Migrant Services and Multicultural Affairs (on personal leave)
National	Andrew Gee MP	NSW	Minister for Decentralisation and Regional Education; Assistant Trade and Investment Minister
Liberal	Melissa Price MP	WA	Minister for Defence Industry

=== Assistant ministry ===
Party	Minister	State/territory	Portfolio
Liberal	Ben Morton MP	WA	Assistant Minister to the Prime Minister and Cabinet
Liberal (LNP)	Scott Buchholz MP	Qld	Assistant Minister for Road Safety and Freight Transport
National	Kevin Hogan MP	NSW	Assistant Minister to the Deputy Prime Minister
Liberal	Nola Marino MP	WA	Assistant Minister for Regional Development and Territories
Liberal	Senator Jane Hume	Vic	Assistant Minister for Superannuation, Financial Services and Financial Technology
Liberal	Senator Zed Seselja	ACT	Assistant Minister for Finance, Charities and Electoral Matters
Liberal	Senator Jonathon Duniam	Tas	Assistant Minister for Forestry and Fisheries; Assistant Minister for Regional Tourism
Liberal	Jason Wood MP	Vic	Assistant Minister for Customs, Community Safety and Multicultural Affairs
Liberal	Steve Irons MP	WA	Assistant Minister for Vocational Education, Training and Apprenticeships
Liberal (LNP)	Trevor Evans MP	Qld	Assistant Minister for Waste Reduction and Environmental Management
National (LNP)	Michelle Landry MP	Qld	Assistant Minister for Northern Australia; Assistant Minister for Children and Families
Liberal (LNP)	Luke Howarth MP	Qld	Assistant Minister for Community Housing, Homelessness and Community Services

=== Party breakdown ===
==== Cabinet ====
Party breakdown of cabinet ministers:

- Liberal (Note: Includes three LNP ministers sitting in Liberal party room.)
- National (Note: Includes two LNP ministers sitting in National party room.)
18
4

==== Entire ministry ====
Party breakdown of entire ministry:

- Liberal (Note: Includes six LNP ministers sitting in Liberal party room.)
- National (Note: Includes three LNP ministers sitting in National party room.)
33
8

== First arrangement ==
The first arrangement of the Second Morrison Ministry was sworn in on 29 May 2019. In December 2019, it was announced that Immigration Minister David Coleman would be taking indefinite leave for personal reasons, with Alan Tudge taking over his portfolio as acting minister. The arrangement became unaltered until the resignation of National Party senators Bridget McKenzie and Matt Canavan on 2 and 3 February 2020 respectively. Until the reshuffle on 6 February, Nationals leader and Deputy Prime Minister Michael McCormack was the acting Minister for Agriculture, taking over from McKenzie, while Water Resources minister David Littleproud was the acting Minister for Resources and Northern Australia, taking over from Canavan.

=== Cabinet ===
Party	Minister	Portrait	Portfolio
Liberal	Scott Morrison MP		Prime Minister; Minister for the Public Service; Leader of the Liberal Party
National	Michael McCormack MP		Deputy Prime Minister; Minister for Infrastructure, Transport and Regional Development; Leader of the National Party
Liberal	Josh Frydenberg MP		Treasurer; Deputy Leader of the Liberal Party
National	Senator Bridget McKenzie		Minister for Agriculture; Deputy Leader of the National Party
Liberal	Senator Mathias Cormann		Minister for Finance; Vice-President of the Executive Council; Leader of the Government in the Senate
Liberal	Senator Simon Birmingham		Minister for Trade, Tourism and Investment; Deputy Leader of the Government in the Senate
Liberal	Christian Porter MP		Attorney-General; Minister for Industrial Relations; Leader of the House
Liberal	Senator Marise Payne		Minister for Foreign Affairs; Minister for Women
Liberal (LNP)	Peter Dutton MP		Minister for Home Affairs
Liberal	Senator Linda Reynolds		Minister for Defence
Liberal	Alan Tudge MP		Minister for Population, Cities and Urban Infrastructure; Acting Minister for Immigration, Citizenship, Migrant Services and Multicultural Affairs (since December 2019)
Liberal	Greg Hunt MP		Minister for Health; Minister Assisting the Prime Minister for the Public Service and Cabinet
Liberal	Paul Fletcher MP		Minister for Communications, Cyber Safety and the Arts
Liberal	Dan Tehan MP		Minister for Education
Liberal	Senator Michaelia Cash		Minister for Employment, Skills, Small and Family Business
Liberal (LNP)	Karen Andrews MP		Minister for Industry, Science and Technology
National (LNP)	Senator Matt Canavan		Minister for Resources and Northern Australia
Liberal	Angus Taylor MP		Minister for Energy and Emissions Reduction
Liberal	Sussan Ley MP		Minister for the Environment
Liberal	Senator Anne Ruston		Minister for Families and Social Services; Manager of Government Business in the Senate
Liberal	Ken Wyatt MP		Minister for Indigenous Australians
National (LNP)	David Littleproud MP		Minister for Water Resources, Drought, Rural Finance, Natural Disaster and Emergency Management
Liberal (LNP)	Stuart Robert MP		Minister for the National Disability Insurance Scheme; Minister for Government Services

=== Outer ministry ===
Party	Minister	Portrait	Portfolio
National	Mark Coulton MP		Minister for Regional Services, Decentralisation and Local Government; Assistant Trade and Investment Minister
Liberal	Michael Sukkar MP		Assistant Treasurer; Minister for Housing
Liberal	Alex Hawke MP		Minister for International Development and the Pacific; Assistant Defence Minister
Liberal	Senator Richard Colbeck		Minister for Aged Care and Senior Australians; Minister for Youth and Sport
Liberal	David Coleman MP		Minister for Immigration, Citizenship, Migrant Services and Multicultural Affairs (on personal leave since December 2019)
National	Darren Chester MP		Minister for Veterans and Defence Personnel; Deputy Leader of the House
Liberal	Melissa Price MP		Minister for Defence Industry

=== Assistant ministry ===
Party	Minister	Portrait	Portfolio
Liberal	Ben Morton MP		Assistant Minister to the Prime Minister and Cabinet
Liberal (LNP)	Scott Buchholz MP		Assistant Minister for Road Safety and Freight Transport
National	Andrew Gee MP		Assistant Minister to the Deputy Prime Minister
Liberal	Nola Marino MP		Assistant Minister for Regional Development and Territories
Liberal	Senator Jane Hume		Assistant Minister for Superannuation, Financial Services and Financial Technology
Liberal	Senator Zed Seselja		Assistant Minister for Finance, Charities and Electoral Matters
Liberal	Senator Jonathon Duniam		Assistant Minister for Forestry and Fisheries; Assistant Minister for Regional Tourism
Liberal	Jason Wood MP		Assistant Minister for Customs, Community Safety and Multicultural Affairs
Liberal	Steve Irons MP		Assistant Minister for Vocational Education, Training and Apprenticeships
Liberal (LNP)	Trevor Evans MP		Assistant Minister for Waste Reduction and Environmental Management
National (LNP)	Michelle Landry MP		Assistant Minister for Children and Families
Liberal (LNP)	Luke Howarth MP		Assistant Minister for Community Housing, Homelessness and Community Services

== See also ==
- 2020s in Australia political history
- Scott Morrison ministerial positions controversy
