= Pat Conroy (politician) =

Australian politician

The Honourable Pat Conroy MP
- Official portrait, 2025

Minister for Defence Industry
- Incumbent
- Assumed office 13 May 2025
- Prime Minister: Anthony Albanese
- Preceded by: Himself (as Minister for Defence Industry and Capability Delivery)
- In office 1 June 2022 – 19 July 2024
- Prime Minister: Anthony Albanese
- Preceded by: Melissa Price
- Succeeded by: Himself (as Minister for Defence Industry and Capability Delivery)

Minister for Pacific Island Affairs
- Incumbent
- Assumed office 13 May 2025
- Prime Minister: Anthony Albanese
- Preceded by: Himself (as Minister for International Development and the Pacific)

Minister for Defence Industry and Capability Delivery
- In office 29 July 2024 – 13 May 2025
- Prime Minister: Anthony Albanese
- Preceded by: Himself (as Minister for Defence Industry)
- Succeeded by: Himself (as Minister for Defence Industry)

Minister for International Development and the Pacific
- In office 1 June 2022 – 13 May 2025
- Prime Minister: Anthony Albanese
- Preceded by: Zed Seselja
- Succeeded by: Anne Aly (as Minister for International Development); Himself (as Minister for Pacific Island Affairs)

Member of the Australian Parliament for Shortland
- Incumbent
- Assumed office 2 July 2016
- Preceded by: Jill Hall

Member of the Australian Parliament for Charlton
- In office 7 September 2013 – 2 July 2016
- Preceded by: Greg Combet
- Succeeded by: Seat abolished

Personal details
- Born: Patrick Martin Conroy; 10 May 1979 (age 47) Sydney, Australia
- Citizenship: Australian; British (1979–2013)
- Party: Labor
- Children: 2
- Education: Gosford High School
- Alma mater: University of Sydney, BEc(Hons)
- Profession: Economist, politician
- Website: www.patconroy.com.au

Patrick Martin Conroy (born 10 May 1979) is an Australian politician. He is a member of the Australian Labor Party (ALP) and the Labor Left faction and has been a member of the House of Representatives since 2013. He represented the Division of Charlton in New South Wales until its abolition in 2016, and since then has represented the Division of Shortland. He is currently the Minister for Defence Industry and Minister for Pacific Island Affairs.

== Early life ==
Conroy was born in Sydney, however he moved to the Central Coast of New South Wales when he was a year old. His parents were "union delegates throughout their lives and long-time Labor activists". He was born a British citizen by descent through his father, who was born in Bishop Auckland, County Durham, England. He renounced his dual citizenship before standing at the 2013 election in accordance with section 44 of the constitution.

Conroy attended Ettalong Public School and Gosford High School. Growing up he played for the Woy Woy Football Club and the Gosford Rugby Club. Conroy holds the degree of Bachelor of Economics (Hons.) from the University of Sydney. He joined the ALP in 1994 and served as a state and federal vice-president of Australian Young Labor from 2003 to 2004. Prior to entering parliament, he worked as an electorate officer for Anthony Albanese (2000), an industrial/policy officer with the CFMEU's forestry division (2000–2002), a policy adviser to George Campbell (2002–2004), national economist to the Australian Manufacturing Workers' Union (2004–2008), and as principal policy adviser (2008–2011) and deputy chief of staff (2011–2013) to Greg Combet.

== Parliament ==
Conroy was elected to parliament at the 2013 federal election, retaining the Division of Charlton for the Labor Party following Greg Combet's retirement. He transferred to the Division of Shortland at the 2016 election, following Charlton's abolition. After the election he was appointed to Bill Shorten's shadow ministry as an assistant minister for the portfolios of infrastructure and climate change and energy. He retained his place in Anthony Albanese's shadow ministry after the 2019 election, and was promoted to Shadow Minister for International Development and the Pacific as well as minister assisting in the portfolios of climate change, defence and government accountability.

Conroy is aligned with the ALP's Socialist Left faction, and serves as one of the two federal parliamentary convenors of the Labor Left faction, along with Andrew Giles.

Following the 2022 federal election, Conroy became Minister for International Development and the Pacific and Minister for Defence Industry in the Albanese ministry.

== Cabinet ==
In the July 2024 reshuffle, Conroy retained his portfolios but was elevated to cabinet. After the Labor government was re-elected in the 2025 federal election, the portfolio of International Development and the Pacific was split. Conroy became Minister for Pacific Island Affairs and remained as Minister for Defence Industry, while Anne Aly was appointed as Minister for International Development.

As Defence Industry minister, Conroy has announced several capability acquisitions. These include new naval strike missiles, cruise missiles and a land-based, long-range, High Mobility Artillery Rocket System (Himars).On the 5 August 2025, Conroy alongside Defense Minister Richard Marles announced the commissioning of a $10b fleet of Japanese Mogami frigates to be built by Japanese company Mitsubishi Heavy Industries.

Parliament of Australia
| Preceded by Greg Combet | Member for Charlton; 2013–2016 | Division abolished |
| Preceded by Jill Hall | Member for Shortland; 2016–present | Incumbent |
Political offices
| Preceded by Zed Seselja | Minister for International Development; 2022–present | Succeeded by Anne Aly |
| Preceded by Melissa Price | Minister for Defence Industry; 2022–present | Incumbent |
| Preceded by Zed Seselja | Minister for Pacific Islands Affairs; 2025–present | Incumbent |
