= First Morrison ministry =

71st ministry of government of Australia

- 71st ministry of Australia

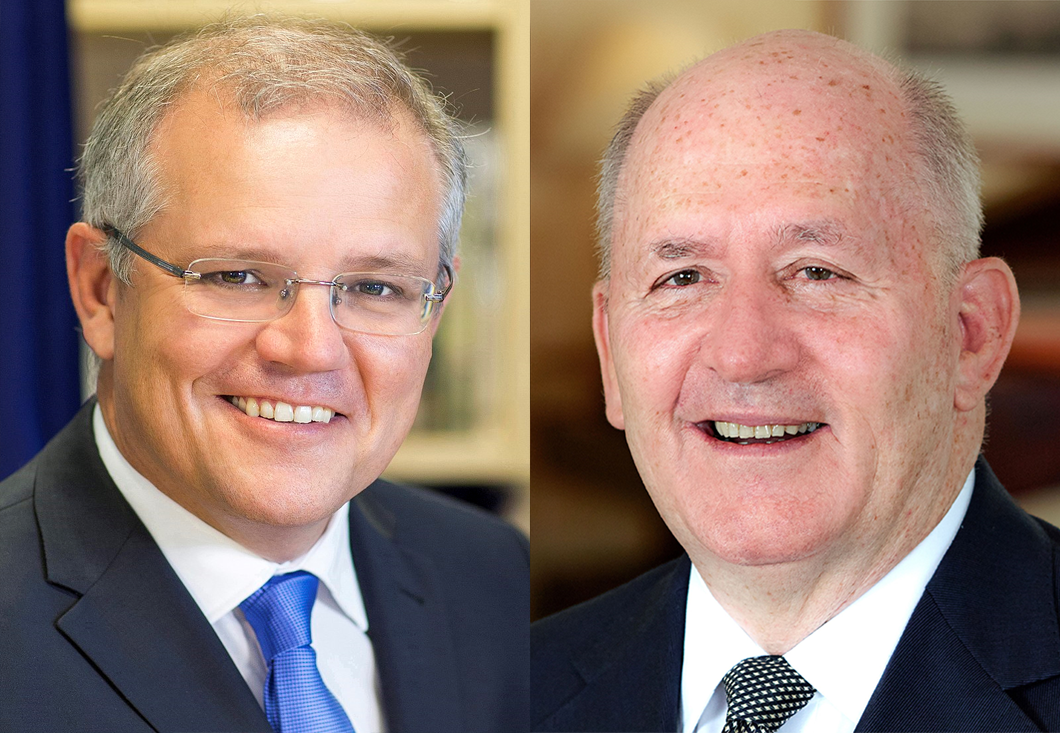
- Prime Minister Scott Morrison with Governor-General Sir Peter Cosgrove
- Date formed: 24 August 2018
- Date dissolved: 29 May 2019

People and organisations
- Monarch: Elizabeth II
- Governor-General: Sir Peter Cosgrove
- Prime Minister: Scott Morrison
- Deputy Prime Minister: Michael McCormack
- No. of ministers: 31
- Member party: Liberal–National coalition
- Status in legislature: Coalition minority government
- Opposition cabinet: Shadow ministry of Bill Shorten
- Opposition party: Labor
- Opposition leader: Bill Shorten

History
- Outgoing election: 18 May 2019
- Legislature term: 45th
- Predecessor: Second Turnbull ministry
- Successor: Second Morrison ministry

The first Morrison ministry (Liberal–National Coalition) was the 71st ministry of the Government of Australia. It was led by Prime Minister, Scott Morrison. The Morrison ministry succeeded the second Turnbull ministry, which dissolved on 24 August 2018 following the Liberal Party leadership spills.

Morrison and his treasurer Josh Frydenberg were sworn in on 24 August. The full ministry was announced on 26 August and sworn in on 28 August 2018. Following Morrison's victory in the 2019 federal election, the second Morrison ministry was formed in 2019.

== Arrangement ==
There were three ministerial changes in this arrangement. The first came on 26 November 2018 when David Littleproud was appointed as the Minister Assisting the Prime Minister for Drought Preparation and Response. This was on top of his responsibilities as Minister for Agriculture and Water Resources. The second came on 18 December 2018, when Andrew Broad resigned as the Assistant Minister to the Deputy Prime Minister following a sex scandal. He was replaced by Andrew Gee who was sworn in on 25 January 2019.

The final change was the appointment of Linda Reynolds to the Cabinet as Minister for Defence Industry on 2 March 2019, replacing Steven Ciobo. Reynolds was also appointed Minister for Emergency Management and North Queensland Recovery following the 2019 North Queensland floods. This was following the announcement by Ciobo and the Minister for Defence Christopher Pyne that they intend to retire at the upcoming federal election.

=== Cabinet ===
Party	Minister	Portrait	Offices
Liberal	Scott Morrison (born 1968) MP for Cook (NSW) (2007–2024)		Prime Minister; Leader of the Liberal Party of Australia
National	Michael McCormack (born 1964) MP for Riverina (NSW) (2010–)		Deputy Prime Minister; Minister for Infrastructure, Transport and Regional Development; Leader of the National Party
Liberal	Josh Frydenberg (born 1971) MP for Kooyong (NSW) (2010–2022)		Treasurer; Deputy Leader of the Liberal Party
National	Bridget McKenzie (born 1969) Senator for Victoria (2019–)		Minister for Regional Services, Sport, Local Government and Decentralisation; Deputy Leader of the National Party
Liberal	Mathias Cormann (born 1970) Senator for Western Australia (2007–2020)		Minister for Finance and the Public Service; Vice-President of the Executive Council; Leader of the Government in the Senate
CLP	Nigel Scullion (born 1956) Senator for the Northern Territory (2001–2019)		Minister for Indigenous Affairs; Leader of the National Party in the Senate
Liberal	Christopher Pyne (born 1967) MP for Sturt (SA) (1993–2019)		Minister for Defence; Leader of the House
LNP	Steven Ciobo (born 1974) MP for Moncrieff (Qld.) (2001–2019)		Minister for Defence Industry (until 2 March 2019)
Liberal	Linda Reynolds (born 1965) Senator for Western Australia (2014–2025)		Minister for Defence Industry (from 2 March 2019); Minister for Emergency Management and North Queensland Recovery (from 2 March 2019); Assistant Minister for Home Affairs (to 2 March 2019)
Liberal	Marise Payne (born 1964) Senator for New South Wales (1997–2023)		Minister for Foreign Affairs
Liberal	Simon Birmingham (born 1974) Senator for South Australia (2007–2025)		Minister for Trade, Tourism and Investment; Deputy Leader of the Government in the Senate
Liberal	Christian Porter (born 1970) MP for Pearce (WA) (2013–2022)		Attorney-General
LNP	Peter Dutton (born 1970) MP for Dickson (Qld.) (2001–2025)		Minister for Home Affairs
Liberal	Mitch Fifield (born 1967) Senator for Victoria (2004–2019)		Minister for Communications and the Arts; Manager of Government Business in the Senate
Liberal	Kelly O'Dwyer (born 1977) MP for Higgins (Vic.) (2009–2019)		Minister for Jobs and Industrial Relations; Minister for Women
Liberal	Michaelia Cash (born 1970) Senator for Western Australia (2008–)		Minister for Small and Family Business, Skills and Vocational Education
LNP	Matt Canavan (born 1980) Senator for Queensland (2014–)		Minister for Resources and Northern Australia
LNP	Karen Andrews (born 1960) MP for McPherson (Qld.) (2010–2025)		Minister for Industry, Science and Technology
Liberal	Dan Tehan (born 1968) MP for Wannon (Vic.) (2010–)		Minister for Education
Liberal	Greg Hunt (born 1965) MP for Flinders (Vic.) (2001–2022)		Minister for Health
Liberal	Paul Fletcher (born 1965) MP for Bradfield (NSW) (2009–2025)		Minister for Families and Social Services
LNP	David Littleproud (born 1976) MP for Maranoa (Qld.) (2016–)		Minister for Agriculture and Water Resources; Minister Assisting the Prime Minister for Drought Preparation and Response (from 26 November 2018)
Liberal	Melissa Price (born 1963) MP for Durack (WA) (2013–)		Minister of the Environment
Liberal	Angus Taylor (born 1966) MP for Hume (NSW) (2013–)		Minister for Energy

=== Outer ministry ===
Party	Minister	Portrait	Offices
Liberal	Alan Tudge (born 1971) MP for Aston (Vic.) (2010–2023)		Minister for Cities, Urban Infrastructure and Population
LNP	Stuart Robert (born 1970) MP for Fadden (Qld.) (2007–2023)		Assistant Treasurer
Liberal	Alex Hawke (born 1977) MP for Mitchell (NSW) (2007–)		Special Minister of State
National	Darren Chester (born 1967) MP for Gippsland (Vic.) (2008–)		Minister for Veterans' Affairs; Minister for Defence Personnel; Minister Assisting the Prime Minister for the Centenary of ANZAC; Deputy Leader of the House
Liberal	David Coleman (born 1974) MP for Banks (NSW) (2013–2025)		Minister for Immigration, Citizenship and Multicultural Affairs
Liberal	Ken Wyatt (born 1952) MP for Hasluck (WA) (2010–2022)		Minister for Senior Australians and Aged Care; Minister for Indigenous Health
Liberal	Michael Keenan (born 1972) MP for Stirling (WA) (2004–2019)		Minister for Human Services and Digital Transformation

=== Assistant ministry ===
Party	Assistant Minister	Portrait	Offices
Liberal	Steve Irons (born 1958) MP for Swan (WA) (2007–2022)		Assistant Minister to the Prime Minister
Liberal	Sussan Ley (born 1961) MP for Farrer (NSW) (2001–2026)		Assistant Minister for Regional Development and Territories
National	Andrew Broad (born 1975) MP for Mallee (Vic.) (2013–2019)		Assistant Minister to the Deputy Prime Minister (to 18 December 2018)
National	Andrew Gee (born 1968) MP for Calare (NSW) (2016–)		Assistant Minister to the Deputy Prime Minister (from 25 January 2019)
Liberal	Scott Buchholz (born 1968) MP for Wright (Qld.) (2010–)		Assistant Minister for Roads and Transport
Liberal	Zed Seselja (born 1977) Senator for the Australian Capital Territory (2013–2022)		Assistant Minister for Treasury and Finance
Liberal	David Fawcett (born 1963) Senator for South Australia (2011–2025); MP for Wakefield (SA) (2004–2007)		Assistant Minister for Defence
Liberal	Anne Ruston (born 1963) Senator for South Australia (2012–)		Assistant Minister for International Development and the Pacific
National	Mark Coulton (born 1958) MP for Parkes (NSW) (2007–2025)		Assistant Minister for Trade, Tourism and Investment
Liberal	Sarah Henderson (born 1964) Senator for Victoria (2019–); MP for Corangamite (Vic.) (2013–2019)		Assistant Minister for Social Services, Housing and Disability Services
LNP	Michelle Landry (born 1962) MP for Capricornia (Qld.) (2013–)		Assistant Minister for Children and Families
Liberal	Richard Colbeck (born 1958) Senator for Tasmania (2002–2016, 2018–)		Assistant Minister for Agriculture and Water Resources
