= 2025 National Party of Australia leadership spill =

Australian political party election

- 12 May 2025

19 caucus members of the National Party 10 caucus votes needed to win
- Leadership election
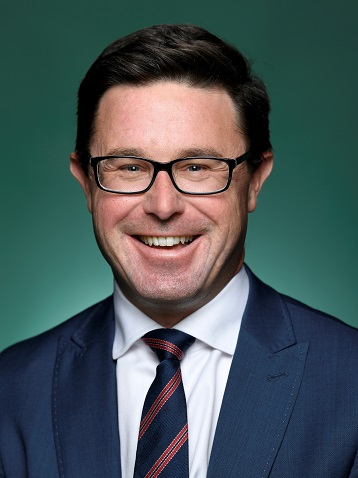

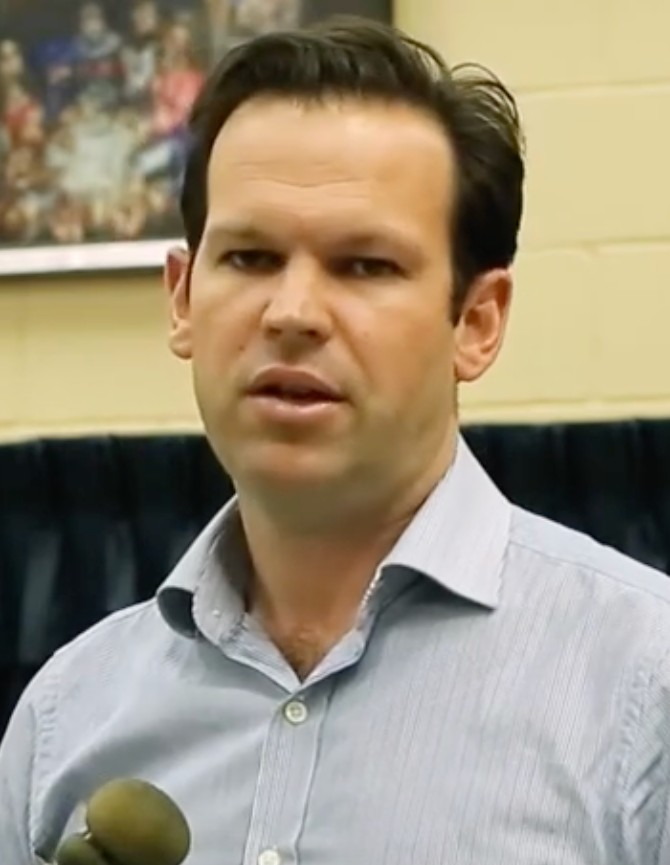
Candidate	David Littleproud	Matt Canavan
Caucus vote	≥10	<10
Seat	Maranoa (Qld)	Senator for Qld
Leader before election
David Littleproud
Elected Leader
David Littleproud
- Deputy leadership election
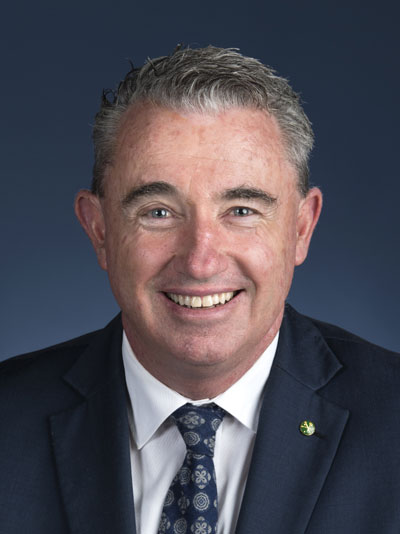
Candidate	Kevin Hogan
Caucus vote	≥10
Seat	Page (NSW)
Deputy Leader before election
Perin Davey
Elected Deputy Leader
Kevin Hogan

The 2025 National Party of Australia leadership spill was held on 12 May 2025 to elect the leader of the National Party of Australia. Incumbent leader David Littleproud was re-elected after being challenged by Queensland senator Matt Canavan, with Kevin Hogan elected deputy leader following Perin Davey's defeat at the 2025 federal election. Bridget McKenzie was re-elected as Nationals leader in the Senate, and although her term expires on 30 June 2025, Davey was elected deputy Senate leader.

The National Party holds an automatic leadership spill following every federal election. The results of its internal ballots are not officially released.

== Background ==
=== 2022 leadership spill ===
The Liberal–National coalition lost the 2022 federal election to the Labor Party, although the Nationals retained all of its 16 seats in the House of Representatives (including 6 MPs from the Liberal National Party of Queensland who sit in the Nationals party room).

On 30 May 2022, the Nationals held a leadership election. Deputy leader David Littleproud challenged incumbent leader Barnaby Joyce and won, with Perin Davey replacing Littleproud as deputy leader.

=== 2025 federal election ===
The Labor government, led by prime minister Anthony Albanese, was re-elected on 3 May 2025 to a second consecutive term in office in a landslide victory. The Nationals retained all House of Representative seats it held prior to the election, while Andrew Gee – who resigned from the Nationals in December 2023 – was re-elected in the seat of Calare as an independent. However, New South Wales senator Perin Davey – who was placed third on the Coalition's ticket – was not re-elected.

=== 2025 leadership spill ===
Colin Boyce, the member for Flynn, was the first Nationals MP to call for a change in leadership, saying Littleproud should step down because he "must bear some of the responsibility for what happened".

== Candidates ==
=== Leader ===
==== Declared ====
Candidate	Electorate	Announced	Portfolio(s)
David Littleproud	Maranoa (Qld)	5 May 2025	Leader of the National Party (2022–present)
Matt Canavan	Senator for Queensland	9 May 2025	Minister for Resources and Northern Australia (2016–2017; 2017–2020)

==== Declined ====
Candidate	Electorate	Declined	Portfolio(s)
Barnaby Joyce	New England (NSW)	4 May 2025	Leader of the National Party (2016–2018; 2021–2022); Deputy Prime Minister of Australia (2016–2018; 2021–2022)
Michael McCormack	Riverina (NSW)	12 May 2025	Leader of the National Party (2018–2021); Deputy Prime Minister of Australia (2018–2021)

=== Deputy leader ===
==== Declared ====
Candidate	Electorate	Portfolio(s)
Kevin Hogan	Page (NSW)	Shadow Minister for Trade and Tourism (2022–2025)

==== Declined ====
Candidate	Electorate	Declined	Portfolio(s)
Bridget McKenzie	Senator for Victoria	12 May 2025	Leader of the Nationals in the Senate (2019–present)
Jacinta Price	Senator for the Northern Territory	8 May 2025 (joined Liberal Party)	Shadow Minister for Indigenous Australians (2023–2025)

== Endorsements ==
=== David Littleproud ===
List of David Littleproud endorsements

Federal Nationals members

- Michael McCormack – MP for Riverina (NSW) and former Nationals leader (2018–2021)
- Kevin Hogan – MP for Page (NSW)

=== Matt Canavan ===
List of Matt Canavan endorsements

Federal Nationals members

- Barnaby Joyce – MP for New England (NSW) and former Nationals leader (2016–2018; 2021–2022)
- Colin Boyce – MP for Flynn (Qld)
- Llew O'Brien – MP for Wide Bay (Qld)

Former federal Nationals members

- George Christensen – Nationals MP for Dawson (Qld) from 2010–2022 (current Mackay councillor and One Nation member)

Other politicians

- Craig Kelly – Liberal/United Australia MP for Hughes (2010–2022) (current Libertarian Party member)
- Campbell Newman – Premier of Queensland (2012–2015) (former Liberal National Party member; current Libertarian Party member)
- Pauline Hanson – Leader of One Nation and Senator for Queensland
- Lyle Shelton – National Director of the Family First Party

Media personalities

- Adam Creighton – The Australian journalist
- Rowan Dean – conservative commentator and Sky News Australia host

Organisations

- Australian Taxpayers' Alliance
- FamilyVoice Australia

== Aftermath ==
On 20 May 2025, Littleproud announced that the Nationals would not renew the Coalition agreement with the Liberals.

The split from the Coalition came about as a result of policy differences around nuclear power, a future fund for regional Australia and supermarket divestiture powers as the main sticking points.

This resulted in the two parties operating separately for the first time since the 1980s, and thus reducing the Nationals to third party status in the Australian Parliament, sitting on the crossbench. However, Littleproud told newly elected Liberal leader Sussan Ley that he has every intention of working toward a renewed Coalition agreement in time for the next election.

On 28 May 2025, the Coalition agreement was restored following agreement on several policy areas that the Nationals had advocated, and a new shadow ministry was revealed.

== See also ==
- 2025 Liberal Party of Australia leadership election
- 2025 Australian Greens leadership election
