= Second Turnbull ministry =

70th ministry of government of Australia

- 70th ministry of Australia

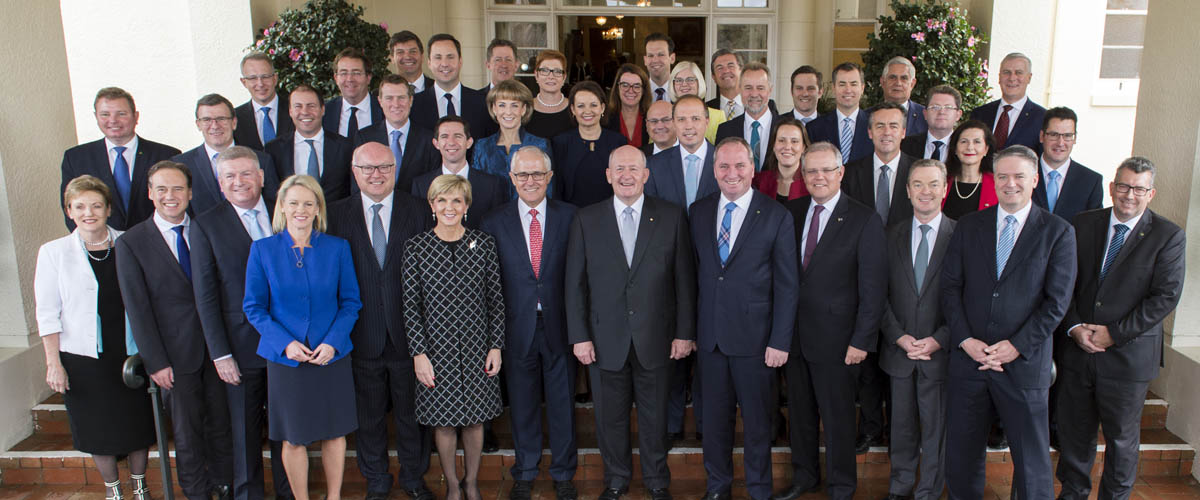
- Governor-General Sir Peter Cosgrove with members of the second Turnbull ministry
- Date formed: 19 July 2016
- Date dissolved: 24 August 2018

People and organisations
- Monarch: Elizabeth II
- Governor-General: Sir Peter Cosgrove
- Prime Minister: Malcolm Turnbull
- Deputy Prime Minister: Barnaby Joyce; Michael McCormack
- No. of ministers: 30
- Member party: Liberal–National coalition
- Status in legislature: Coalition majority government
- Opposition cabinet: Shorten shadow ministry
- Opposition party: Labor
- Opposition leader: Bill Shorten

History
- Election: 2 July 2016
- Legislature term: 45th
- Predecessor: First Turnbull ministry
- Successor: First Morrison ministry

The second Turnbull ministry (Liberal–National Coalition) was the 70th ministry of the Government of Australia, led by Prime Minister Malcolm Turnbull. It succeeded the first Turnbull ministry following the 2016 Australian federal election on 2 July 2016.

On 13 January 2017, Sussan Ley resigned from her portfolios after an expenses scandal. In the following rearrangement, the roles of Greg Hunt and Arthur Sinodinos were changed, while Ken Wyatt became the first Indigenous Australian to serve as a federal minister.

On 25 July 2017, Matt Canavan resigned from Cabinet over doubts as to his eligibility to be a member of the parliament, after discovering that he was considered by the Italian authorities to be a citizen of Italy. Dual citizens are generally ineligible to be elected or sit as a member of parliament under section 44 of the Australian Constitution. Barnaby Joyce took on Canavan's portfolio. On 27 October 2017, Joyce and Fiona Nash were disqualified from parliament by the High Court, also due to holding dual citizenship, while Canavan was ruled eligible.

The ministry ended with Malcolm Turnbull's replacement by Scott Morrison following the 2018 Liberal Party leadership spills.

== First arrangement ==
The first arrangement of the second Turnbull ministry was sworn in on 19 July 2016 and continued unaltered until the resignation of Sussan Ley on 13 January 2017, following an investigation into her travel expenses. Arthur Sinodinos briefly acted in Ley's portfolios until the new ministry was sworn in on 24 January 2017.

=== Cabinet ===
Party	Minister	Portrait	Offices
Liberal	Malcolm Turnbull (born 1954) MP for Wentworth (NSW) (2004–2018)		Prime Minister; Leader of the Liberal Party
National	Barnaby Joyce (born 1967) MP for New England (NSW) (2013-)		Deputy Prime Minister; Minister for Agriculture and Water Resources; Leader of the National Party
Liberal	Julie Bishop (born 1956) MP for Curtin (WA) (1998-2019)		Minister for Foreign Affairs; Deputy Leader of the Liberal Party
National	Fiona Nash (born 1965) Senator for New South Wales (2005-2017)		Minister for Regional Communications; Minister for Regional Development; Minister for Local Government and Territories; Deputy Leader of the National Party
National (LNP)	George Brandis QC (born 1957) Senator for Queensland (2000-2018)		Attorney-General; Vice-President of the Executive Council; Leader of the Government in the Senate
Liberal	Scott Morrison (born 1968) MP for Cook (NSW) (2007-2024)		Treasurer
Liberal	Mathias Cormann (born 1970) Senator for Western Australia (2007-2020)		Minister for Finance; Deputy Leader of the Government in the Senate
Liberal	Christopher Pyne (born 1967) MP for Sturt (SA) (1993-2019)		Minister for Defence Industry; Leader of the House
National (CLP)	Nigel Scullion (born 1956) Senator for the Northern Territory (2001-2019)		Minister for Indigenous Affairs; Leader of the National Party in the Senate
Liberal (LNP)	Peter Dutton (born 1965) MP for Dickson (QLD) (2001-2025)		Minister for Immigration and Border Protection
Liberal	Greg Hunt (born 1965) MP for Flinders (VIC) (2001-2022)		Minister for Industry, Innovation and Science
Liberal	Sussan Ley (born 1961) MP for Farrer (NSW) (2001-2026) (until 13 January 2017)		Minister for Health and Aged Care; Minister for Sport
Liberal	Marise Payne (born 1964) Senator for New South Wales (1997-2023)		Minister for Defence
Liberal	Mitch Fifield (born 1967) Senator for Victoria (2004-2019)		Minister for Communications; Minister for the Arts
Liberal	Michaelia Cash (born 1970) Senator for Western Australia (2008-)		Minister for Employment; Minister for Women; Minister Assisting the Prime Minister for the Public Service
Liberal	Christian Porter (born 1970) MP for Pearce (WA) (2013-2022)		Minister for Social Services
Liberal	Simon Birmingham (born 1974) Senator for South Australia (2007-2025)		Minister for Education and Training
Liberal	Arthur Sinodinos (born 1957) Senator for New South Wales (2011-2019)		Cabinet Secretary
Liberal (LNP)	Steven Ciobo (born 1974) MP for Moncrieff (QLD) (2001-2019)		Minister for Trade, Tourism and Investment
National)	Darren Chester (born 1967) MP for Gippsland (VIC) (2008-)		Minister for Infrastructure and Transport
Liberal	Kelly O’Dwyer (born 1977) MP for Higgins (VIC) (2009-2019)		Minister for Revenue and Financial Services
Liberal	Josh Frydenberg (born 1971) MP for Kooyong (VIC) (2010-2022)		Minister for the Environment and Energy
National (LNP)	Matt Canavan (born 1980) Senator for Queensland (2014-) (until 25 July 2017)		Minister for Resources and Northern Australia

=== Outer ministry ===
Party	Minister	Portrait	Offices
Liberal	Paul Fletcher (born 1965) MP for Bradfield (NSW) (2009-2025)		Minister for Urban Infrastructure
Liberal	Concetta Fierravanti-Wells (born 1960) Senator for New South Wales (2005-2022)		Minister for International Development and the Pacific
Liberal	Michael Keenan (born 1972) MP for Stirling (WA) (2004-2019)		Minister for Justice; Minister Assisting the Prime Minister for Counter-Terrorism
National	Michael McCormack (born 1964) MP for Riverina (NSW) (2010-)		Minister for Small Business
Liberal	Dan Tehan (born 1968) MP for Wannon (VIC) (2010-)		Minister for Veterans' Affairs; Minister for Defence Personnel; Minister Assisting the Prime Minister for Cyber Security
Liberal	Alan Tudge (born 1961) MP for Aston (VIC) (2010-2023)		Minister for Human Services
Liberal	Scott Ryan (born 1973) Senator for Victoria (2008-2021)		Special Minister of State; Minister Assisting the Prime Minister for Cabinet

=== Assistant ministers ===
Party	Minister	Portrait	Offices
Liberal	James McGrath (born 1974) Senator for Queensland (2014-)		Assistant Minister to the Prime Minister
Liberal	Angus Taylor (born 1966) MP for Hume (NSW) (2013-)		Assistant Minister to the Prime Minister for Cities and Digital Transformation
National (LNP)	Keith Pitt (born 1969) MP for Hinkler (QLD) (2013-2025)		Assistant Minister for Trade, Investment and Tourism
Liberal	Anne Ruston (born 1963) Senator for South Australia (2012-)		Assistant Minister for Agriculture and Water Resources
Liberal	Alex Hawke (born 1977) MP for Mitchell (NSW) (2007-)		Assistant Minister to the Minister for Immigration and Border Protection
Liberal (LNP)	Karen Andrews (born 1960) MP for McPherson (QLD) (2010-2025)		Assistant Minister for Vocational Education and Skills
Liberal	Ken Wyatt (born 1952) MP for Hasluck (WA) (2010-2022)		Assistant Minister for Health and Aged Care
Liberal	Craig Laundy (born 1971) MP for Reid (NSW) (2013-2019)		Assistant Minister for Industry, Innovation and Science
Liberal	Zed Seselja (born 1977) Senator for the Australian Capital Territory (2013-2022)		Assistant Minister for Social Services and Multicultural Affairs
Liberal (LNP)	Jane Prentice (born 1953) MP for Ryan (QLD) (2010-2019)		Assistant Minister for Social Services and Disability Services
National	Luke Hartsuyker (born 1959) MP for Cowper (NSW) (2001-2019)		Assistant Minister to the Deputy Prime Minister
Liberal	David Gillespie (born 1957) MP for Lyne (NSW) (2013-2025)		Assistant Minister for Rural Health

== Second arrangement ==
The second arrangement of the second Turnbull ministry was sworn in by the Governor-General, Sir Peter Cosgrove, on 24 January 2017 following the resignation of Sussan Ley. Newly appointed ministers included Ken Wyatt AM, as the first Indigenous Australian to serve as a minister for an Australian Government department, appointed to the role of Minister for Indigenous Health and as Minister for Aged Care. Greg Hunt was appointed to Ley's former portfolios in Health and Sport; Arthur Sinodinos was appointed to Hunt's former portfolio as Minister for Industry, Innovation and Science. Scott Ryan was given additional responsibilities as the Minister Assisting the Prime Minister for Cabinet. David Gillespie, previously Assistant Minister for Rural Health was promoted as Assistant Minister for Health and Michael Sukkar was appointed as the Assistant Minister to the Treasurer. The position of Cabinet Secretary was abolished.

On 25 July 2017, during the 2017 Australian parliamentary eligibility crisis, Matt Canavan resigned from Cabinet over doubts as to his eligibility to be a member of the parliament, after discovering that he was considered by the Italian authorities to be a citizen of Italy. Dual citizens are ineligible to be elected or sit as a member of parliament under section 44 of the Australian Constitution.

=== Cabinet ===
Party	Minister	Portrait	Offices
Liberal	Malcolm Turnbull (born 1961) MP for Wentworth (NSW) (2004–2018)		Prime Minister; Leader of the Liberal Party
National	Barnaby Joyce (born 1967) MP for New England (NSW) (2013-)		Deputy Prime Minister; Minister for Agriculture and Water Resources; Leader of the National Party
Liberal	Julie Bishop (born 1956) MP for Curtin (WA) (1998-2019)		Minister for Foreign Affairs; Deputy Leader of the Liberal Party
National	Fiona Nash (born 1965) Senator for New South Wales (2005-2017)		Minister for Regional Communications; Minister for Regional Development; Minister for Local Government and Territories; Deputy Leader of the National Party
National (LNP)	George Brandis QC (born 1957) Senator for Queensland (2000-2018)		Attorney-General; Vice-President of the Executive Council; Leader of the Government in the Senate
Liberal	Scott Morrison (born 1968) MP for Cook (NSW) (2007-2024)		Treasurer
Liberal	Mathias Cormann (born 1970) Senator for Western Australia (2007-2020)		Minister for Finance; Deputy Leader of the Government in the Senate
Liberal	Christopher Pyne (born 1967) MP for Sturt (SA) (1993-2019)		Minister for Defence Industry; Leader of the House
National (CLP)	Nigel Scullion (born 1956) Senator for the Northern Territory (2001-2019)		Minister for Indigenous Affairs; Leader of the National Party in the Senate
Liberal (LNP)	Peter Dutton (born 1965) MP for Dickson (QLD) (2001-2025)		Minister for Immigration and Border Protection
Liberal	Greg Hunt (born 1965) MP for Flinders (VIC) (2001-2022)		Minister for Health; Minister for Sport
Liberal	Marise Payne (born 1964) Senator for New South Wales (1997-2023)		Minister for Defence
Liberal	Mitch Fifield (born 1967) Senator for Victoria (2004-2019)		Minister for Communications; Minister for the Arts
Liberal	Michaelia Cash (born 1970) Senator for Western Australia (2008-)		Minister for Employment; Minister for Women; Minister Assisting the Prime Minister for the Public Service
Liberal	Christian Porter (born 1970) MP for Pearce (WA) (2013-2022)		Minister for Social Services
Liberal	Simon Birmingham (born 1974) Senator for South Australia (2007-2025)		Minister for Education and Training
Liberal	Arthur Sinodinos (born 1957) Senator for New South Wales (2011-2019)		Minister for Industry, Innovation and Science
Liberal (LNP)	Steven Ciobo (born 1974) MP for Moncrieff (QLD) (2001-2019)		Minister for Trade, Tourism and Investment
National)	Darren Chester (born 1967) MP for Gippsland (VIC) (2008-)		Minister for Infrastructure and Transport
Liberal	Kelly O’Dwyer (born 1977) MP for Higgins (VIC) (2009-2019)		Minister for Revenue and Financial Services
Liberal	Josh Frydenberg (born 1971) MP for Kooyong (VIC) (2010-2022)		Minister for the Environment and Energy
National (LNP)	Matt Canavan (born 1980) Senator for Queensland (2014-) (until 25 July 2017)		Minister for Resources and Northern Australia

=== Outer ministry ===
Party	Minister	Portrait	Offices
Liberal	Paul Fletcher (born 1965) MP for Bradfield (NSW) (2009-2025)		Minister for Urban Infrastructure
Liberal	Concetta Fierravanti-Wells (born 1960) Senator for New South Wales (2005-2022)		Minister for International Development and the Pacific
Liberal	Michael Keenan (born 1972) MP for Stirling (WA) (2004-2019)		Minister for Justice; Minister Assisting the Prime Minister for Counter-Terrorism
National	Michael McCormack (born 1964) MP for Riverina (NSW) (2010-)		Minister for Small Business
Liberal	Dan Tehan (born 1968) MP for Wannon (VIC) (2010-)		Minister for Veterans' Affairs; Minister for Defence Personnel; Minister Assisting the Prime Minister for Cyber Security
Liberal	Ken Wyatt (born 1952) MP for Hasluck (WA) (2010-2022)		Minister for Indigenous Health; Minister for Aged Care
Liberal	Alan Tudge (born 1961) MP for Aston (VIC) (2010-2023)		Minister for Human Services
Liberal	Scott Ryan (born 1973) Senator for Victoria (2008-2021)		Special Minister of State; Minister Assisting the Prime Minister for Cabinet

=== Assistant ministers ===
Party	Minister	Portrait	Offices
Liberal	James McGrath (born 1974) Senator for Queensland (2014-)		Assistant Minister to the Prime Minister
Liberal	Angus Taylor (born 1966) MP for Hume (NSW) (2013-)		Assistant Minister to the Prime Minister for Cities and Digital Transformation
National (LNP)	Keith Pitt (born 1969) MP for Hinkler (QLD) (2013-2025)		Assistant Minister for Trade, Investment and Tourism
Liberal	Anne Ruston (born 1963) Senator for South Australia (2012-)		Assistant Minister for Agriculture and Water Resources
Liberal	Alex Hawke (born 1977) MP for Mitchell (NSW) (2007-)		Assistant Minister to the Minister for Immigration and Border Protection
Liberal (LNP)	Karen Andrews (born 1960) MP for McPherson (QLD) (2010-2025)		Assistant Minister for Vocational Education and Skills
Liberal	Craig Laundy (born 1971) MP for Reid (NSW) (2013-2019)		Assistant Minister for Industry, Innovation and Science
Liberal	Zed Seselja (born 1977) Senator for the Australian Capital Territory (2013-2022)		Assistant Minister for Social Services and Multicultural Affairs
Liberal (LNP)	Jane Prentice (born 1953) MP for Ryan (QLD) (2010-2019)		Assistant Minister for Social Services and Disability Services
National	Luke Hartsuyker (born 1959) MP for Cowper (NSW) (2001-2019)		Assistant Minister to the Deputy Prime Minister
Liberal	David Gillespie (born 1957) MP for Lyne (NSW) (2013-2025)		Assistant Minister for Health
Liberal	Michael Sukkar (born 1981) MP for Deakin (VIC) (2013-2025)		Assistant Minister to the Treasurer

== Third arrangement ==
The third arrangement of the second Turnbull ministry was sworn in by the Governor-General, Sir Peter Cosgrove, on 27 October 2017 following the High Court ruling that Barnaby Joyce and Fiona Nash were invalidly elected due to holding dual citizenship. The same ruling found that Canavan was eligible, allowing him to return to the role of Minister for Resources and Northern Australia that had been held by Joyce in his absence. Prime Minister Malcolm Turnbull took on Joyce's portfolio of Agriculture and Water Resources, and Nigel Scullion took over as the parliamentary leader of the National Party, while the position of Deputy Prime Minister remained vacant with Julie Bishop serving as acting Prime Minister when necessary. Nash's roles were split between Darren Chester (Regional Development, Territories and Local Government) and Mitch Fifield (Regional Communications) as acting ministers.

Joyce regained his Agriculture and Water Resource portfolio on 6 December 2017 after he was re-elected in the 2017 New England by-election.

=== Cabinet ===
Party	Minister	Portrait	Offices
Liberal	Malcolm Turnbull (born 1961) MP for Wentworth (NSW) (2004–2018)		Prime Minister; Minister for Agriculture and Water Resources; Leader of the Liberal Party
Liberal	Julie Bishop (born 1956) MP for Curtin (WA) (1998-2019)		Minister for Foreign Affairs; Deputy Leader of the Liberal Party
National (LNP)	George Brandis QC (born 1957) Senator for Queensland (2000-2018)		Attorney-General; Vice-President of the Executive Council; Leader of the Government in the Senate
Liberal	Scott Morrison (born 1968) MP for Cook (NSW) (2007-2024)		Treasurer
Liberal	Mathias Cormann (born 1970) Senator for Western Australia (2007-2020)		Minister for Finance; Deputy Leader of the Government in the Senate
Liberal	Christopher Pyne (born 1967) MP for Sturt (SA) (1993-2019)		Minister for Defence Industry; Leader of the House
National (CLP)	Nigel Scullion (born 1956) Senator for the Northern Territory (2001-2019)		Minister for Indigenous Affairs; Leader of the National Party in Parliament
Liberal (LNP)	Peter Dutton (born 1965) MP for Dickson (QLD) (2001-2025)		Minister for Immigration and Border Protection
Liberal	Greg Hunt (born 1965) MP for Flinders (VIC) (2001-2022)		Minister for Health; Minister for Sport
Liberal	Marise Payne (born 1964) Senator for New South Wales (1997-2023)		Minister for Defence
Liberal	Mitch Fifield (born 1967) Senator for Victoria (2004-2019)		Minister for Communications; Minister for the Arts; Acting Minister for Regional Communications
Liberal	Michaelia Cash (born 1970) Senator for Western Australia (2008-)		Minister for Employment; Minister for Women; Minister Assisting the Prime Minister for the Public Service
Liberal	Christian Porter (born 1970) MP for Pearce (WA) (2013-2022)		Minister for Social Services
Liberal	Simon Birmingham (born 1974) Senator for South Australia (2007-2025)		Minister for Education and Training
Liberal	Arthur Sinodinos (born 1957) Senator for New South Wales (2011-2019)		Minister for Industry, Innovation and Science
Liberal (LNP)	Steven Ciobo (born 1974) MP for Moncrieff (QLD) (2001-2019)		Minister for Trade, Tourism and Investment
National)	Darren Chester (born 1967) MP for Gippsland (VIC) (2008-)		Minister for Infrastructure and Transport; Acting Minister for Regional Development; Acting Minister for Local Government and Territories
Liberal	Kelly O’Dwyer (born 1977) MP for Higgins (VIC) (2009-2019)		Minister for Revenue and Financial Services
Liberal	Josh Frydenberg (born 1971) MP for Kooyong (VIC) (2010-2022)		Minister for the Environment and Energy
National (LNP)	Matt Canavan (born 1980) Senator for Queensland (2014-)		Minister for Resources and Northern Australia

=== Outer ministry ===
Party	Minister	Portrait	Offices
Liberal	Paul Fletcher (born 1965) MP for Bradfield (NSW) (2009-2025)		Minister for Urban Infrastructure
Liberal	Concetta Fierravanti-Wells (born 1960) Senator for New South Wales (2005-2022)		Minister for International Development and the Pacific
Liberal	Michael Keenan (born 1972) MP for Stirling (WA) (2004-2019)		Minister for Justice; Minister Assisting the Prime Minister for Counter-Terrorism
National	Michael McCormack (born 1964) MP for Riverina (NSW) (2010-)		Minister for Small Business
Liberal	Dan Tehan (born 1968) MP for Wannon (VIC) (2010-)		Minister for Veterans' Affairs; Minister for Defence Personnel; Minister Assisting the Prime Minister for Cyber Security
Liberal	Ken Wyatt (born 1952) MP for Hasluck (WA) (2010-2022)		Minister for Indigenous Health; Minister for Aged Care
Liberal	Alan Tudge (born 1961) MP for Aston (VIC) (2010-2023)		Minister for Human Services
Liberal	Scott Ryan (born 1973) Senator for Victoria (2008-2021)		Special Minister of State; Minister Assisting the Prime Minister for Cabinet

=== Assistant ministers ===
Party	Minister	Portrait	Offices
Liberal	James McGrath (born 1974) Senator for Queensland (2014-)		Assistant Minister to the Prime Minister
Liberal	Angus Taylor (born 1966) MP for Hume (NSW) (2013-)		Assistant Minister to the Prime Minister for Cities and Digital Transformation
National (LNP)	Keith Pitt (born 1969) MP for Hinkler (QLD) (2013-2025)		Assistant Minister for Trade, Investment and Tourism
Liberal	Anne Ruston (born 1963) Senator for South Australia (2012-)		Assistant Minister for Agriculture and Water Resources
Liberal	Alex Hawke (born 1977) MP for Mitchell (NSW) (2007-)		Assistant Minister to the Minister for Immigration and Border Protection
Liberal (LNP)	Karen Andrews (born 1960) MP for McPherson (QLD) (2010-2025)		Assistant Minister for Vocational Education and Skills
Liberal	Craig Laundy (born 1971) MP for Reid (NSW) (2013-2019)		Assistant Minister for Industry, Innovation and Science
Liberal	Zed Seselja (born 1977) Senator for the Australian Capital Territory (2013-2022)		Assistant Minister for Social Services and Multicultural Affairs
Liberal (LNP)	Jane Prentice (born 1953) MP for Ryan (QLD) (2010-2019)		Assistant Minister for Social Services and Disability Services
National	Luke Hartsuyker (born 1959) MP for Cowper (NSW) (2001-2019)		Assistant Minister to the Deputy Prime Minister
Liberal	David Gillespie (born 1957) MP for Lyne (NSW) (2013-2025)		Assistant Minister for Health
Liberal	Michael Sukkar (born 1981) MP for Deakin (VIC) (2013-2025)		Assistant Minister to the Treasurer

== Fourth arrangement ==
The fourth arrangement of the second Turnbull ministry was sworn in by the Governor-General, Sir Peter Cosgrove, on 20 December 2017 following a period of ministerial resignations due to the 2017 Australian parliamentary eligibility crisis including the appointment of Scott Ryan as the President of the Senate, the retirement of George Brandis to take up Australian High Commissioner to the United Kingdom, the recovery of Arthur Sinodinos from cancer, the changes to administrative arrangements with the creation of the Department of Home Affairs.

=== Cabinet ===
Party	Minister	Portrait	Offices
Liberal	Malcolm Turnbull (born 1961) MP for Wentworth (NSW) (2004–2018)		Prime Minister; Leader of the Liberal Party
National	Barnaby Joyce (born 1967) MP for New England (NSW) (2013-)		Deputy Prime Minister; Minister for Infrastructure and Transport; Leader of the National Party
Liberal	Julie Bishop (born 1956) MP for Curtin (WA) (1998-2019)		Minister for Foreign Affairs; Deputy Leader of the Liberal Party
Liberal	Christian Porter (born 1970) MP for Pearce (WA) (2013-2022)		Attorney-General
Liberal	Scott Morrison (born 1968) MP for Cook (NSW) (2007-2024)		Treasurer
Liberal	Mathias Cormann (born 1970) Senator for Western Australia (2007-2020)		Minister for Finance; Special Minister of State; Vice-President of the Executive Council; Leader of the Government in the Senate
Liberal	Christopher Pyne (born 1967) MP for Sturt (SA) (1993-2019)		Minister for Defence Industry; Leader of the House
National (CLP)	Nigel Scullion (born 1956) Senator for the Northern Territory (2001-2019)		Minister for Indigenous Affairs; Leader of the National Party in the Senate
Liberal (LNP)	Peter Dutton (born 1965) MP for Dickson (QLD) (2001-2025)		Minister for Home Affairs
Liberal	Greg Hunt (born 1965) MP for Flinders (VIC) (2001-2022)		Minister for Health
Liberal	Marise Payne (born 1964) Senator for New South Wales (1997-2023)		Minister for Defence
Liberal	Mitch Fifield (born 1967) Senator for Victoria (2004-2019)		Minister for Communications; Minister for the Arts; Deputy Leader of the Government in the Senate
Liberal	Michaelia Cash (born 1970) Senator for Western Australia (2008-)		Minister for Jobs and Innovation
Liberal	Dan Tehan (born 1968) MP for Wannon (VIC) (2010-)		Minister for Social Services
Liberal	Simon Birmingham (born 1974) Senator for South Australia (2007-2025)		Minister for Education and Training; Manager of Government Business in the Senate
National	Bridget McKenzie (born 1969) Senator for Victoria (2011-)		Minister for Sport; Minister for Rural Health; Minister for Regional Communications; Deputy Leader of the National Party
Liberal (LNP)	Steven Ciobo (born 1974) MP for Moncrieff (QLD) (2001-2019)		Minister for Trade, Tourism and Investment
National (LNP)	David Littleproud (born 1974) MP for Maranoa (QLD) (2016-)		Minister for Agriculture and Water Resources
Liberal	Kelly O’Dwyer (born 1977) MP for Higgins (VIC) (2009-2019)		Minister for Revenue and Financial Services; Minister for Women; Minister Assisting the Prime Minister for the Public Service
Liberal	Josh Frydenberg (born 1971) MP for Kooyong (VIC) (2010-2022)		Minister for the Environment and Energy
National (LNP)	Matt Canavan (born 1980) Senator for Queensland (2014-)		Minister for Resources and Northern Australia
Liberal	Michael Keenan (born 1972) MP for Stirling (WA) (2004-2019)		Minister for Human Services; Minister Assisting the Prime Minister for Digital Transformation
Liberal (LNP)	John McVeigh (born 1965) MP for Groom (NSW) (2016-2020)		Minister for Regional Development, Territories and Local Government

=== Outer ministry ===
Party	Minister	Portrait	Offices
Liberal	Paul Fletcher (born 1965) MP for Bradfield (NSW) (2009-2025)		Minister for Urban Infrastructure and Cities
Liberal	Concetta Fierravanti-Wells (born 1960) Senator for New South Wales (2005-2022)		Minister for International Development and the Pacific
Liberal	Angus Taylor (born 1966) MP for Hume (NSW) (2013-)		Minister for Law Enforcement and Cyber Security
Liberal	Alan Tudge (born 1961) MP for Aston (VIC) (2010-2023)		Minister for Citizenship and Multicultural Affairs
Liberal	Craig Laundy (born 1971) MP for Reid (NSW) (2013-2019)		Minister for Small and Family Business, the Workplace and Deregulation
National	Michael McCormack (born 1964) MP for Riverina (NSW) (2010-)		Minister for Veterans' Affairs; Minister for Defence Personnel; Minister Assisting the Prime Minister for the Centenary of ANZAC; Deputy Leader of the House
Liberal	Ken Wyatt (born 1952) MP for Hasluck (WA) (2010-2022)		Minister for Indigenous Health; Minister for Aged Care

=== Assistant ministers ===
Party	Minister	Portrait	Offices
Liberal	James McGrath (born 1974) Senator for Queensland (2014-)		Assistant Minister to the Prime Minister
National	Damian Drum (born 1960) MP for Murray (VIC) (2016-2022)		Assistant Minister to the Deputy Prime Minister
Liberal	Anne Ruston (born 1963) Senator for South Australia (2012-)		Assistant Minister for Agriculture and Water Resources
Liberal	Alex Hawke (born 1977) MP for Mitchell (NSW) (2007-)		Assistant Minister for Home Affairs
Liberal (LNP)	Karen Andrews (born 1960) MP for McPherson (QLD) (2010-2025)		Assistant Minister for Vocational Education and Skills
Liberal	Zed Seselja (born 1977) Senator for the Australian Capital Territory (2013-2022)		Assistant Minister for Science, Jobs and Innovation
Liberal (LNP)	Jane Prentice (born 1953) MP for Ryan (QLD) (2010-2019)		Assistant Minister for Social Services and Disability Services
National	Luke Hartsuyker (born 1959) MP for Cowper (NSW) (2001-2019)		Assistant Minister for Trade, Tourism and Investment
Liberal	David Gillespie (born 1957) MP for Lyne (NSW) (2013-2025)		Assistant Minister for Children and Families
Liberal	Michael Sukkar (born 1981) MP for Deakin (VIC) (2013-2025)		Assistant Minister to the Treasurer
Liberal	Melissa Price (born 1963) MP for Durack (WA) (2013-)		Assistant Minister for the Environment
Liberal	David Coleman (born 1974) MP for Banks (NSW) (2013-2025)		Assistant Minister for Finance

== Final Cabinet composition ==
Following Deputy Prime Minister Barnaby Joyce's resignation from cabinet, the fifth arrangement of the second Turnbull ministry was sworn in on 26 February 2018 by the Governor of Victoria, Linda Dessau, in her capacity as Administrator of the Commonwealth while Governor-General Sir Peter Cosgrove was overseas. Michael McCormack took on Joyce's roles after being elected National Party leader that morning. Rearrangement of other portfolios took effect from 5 March 2018 when the Governor-General Sir Peter Cosgrove swore in the newly appointed Ministers and Parliamentary Secretaries: Darren Chester as Minister for Veterans’ Affairs and Minister for Defence Personnel; Keith Pitt as Assistant Minister to the Deputy Prime Minister; and Mark Coulton as Assistant Minister to the Minister for Trade, Tourism and Investment. Damian Drum and Luke Hartsuyker were demoted from the ministry.

The composition lasted until the 2018 Liberal Party of Australia leadership spills, when a number of ministers resigned from the cabinet to support the spill. These include Peter Dutton, Michael Sukkar, James McGrath, Concetta Fierravanti-Wells, Angus Taylor, Zed Seselja, Michael Keenan and Steve Ciobo. Turnbull refused to accept some. Turnbull was ousted as party leader and Prime Minister and replaced by Scott Morrison.

=== Cabinet ===
Party	Minister	Portrait	Offices
Liberal	Malcolm Turnbull (born 1961) MP for Wentworth (NSW) (2004–2018)		Prime Minister; Leader of the Liberal Party
National	Michael McCormack (born 1964) MP for Riverina (NSW) (2010-)		Deputy Prime Minister; Minister for Infrastructure and Transport; Leader of the National Party; Deputy Leader of the House
Liberal	Julie Bishop (born 1956) MP for Curtin (WA) (1998-2019)		Minister for Foreign Affairs; Deputy Leader of the Liberal Party
Liberal	Christian Porter (born 1970) MP for Pearce (WA) (2013-2022)		Attorney-General
Liberal	Scott Morrison (born 1968) MP for Cook (NSW) (2007-2024)		Treasurer; Minister for Home Affairs
Liberal	Mathias Cormann (born 1970) Senator for Western Australia (2007-2020)		Minister for Finance; Special Minister of State; Vice-President of the Executive Council; Leader of the Government in the Senate
Liberal	Christopher Pyne (born 1967) MP for Sturt (SA) (1993-2019)		Minister for Defence Industry; Leader of the House
National (CLP)	Nigel Scullion (born 1970) Senator for the Northern Territory (2001-2019)		Minister for Indigenous Affairs; Leader of the National Party in the Senate
Liberal	Greg Hunt (born 1965) MP for Flinders (VIC) (2001-2022)		Minister for Health
Liberal	Marise Payne (born 1964) Senator for New South Wales (1997-2023)		Minister for Defence
Liberal	Mitch Fifield (born 1967) Senator for Victoria (2004-2019)		Minister for Communications; Minister for the Arts; Deputy Leader of the Government in the Senate
Liberal	Michaelia Cash (born 1970) Senator for Western Australia (2008-)		Minister for Jobs and Innovation
Liberal	Dan Tehan (born 1968) MP for Wannon (VIC) (2010-)		Minister for Social Services
Liberal	Simon Birmingham (born 1974) Senator for South Australia (2007-2025)		Minister for Education and Training; Manager of Government Business in the Senate
National	Bridget McKenzie (born 1969) Senator for Victoria (2011-)		Minister for Sport; Minister for Rural Health; Minister for Regional Communications; Deputy Leader of the National Party
Liberal (LNP)	Steven Ciobo (born 1974) MP for Moncrieff (QLD) (2001-2019)		Minister for Trade, Tourism and Investment
National (LNP)	David Littleproud (born 1974) MP for Maranoa (QLD) (2016-)		Minister for Agriculture and Water Resources
Liberal	Kelly O’Dwyer (born 1977) MP for Higgins (VIC) (2009-2019)		Minister for Revenue and Financial Services; Minister for Women; Minister Assisting the Prime Minister for the Public Service
Liberal	Josh Frydenberg (born 1971) MP for Kooyong (VIC) (2010-2022)		Minister for the Environment and Energy
National (LNP)	Matt Canavan (born 1980) Senator for Queensland (2014-)		Minister for Resources and Northern Australia
Liberal	Michael Keenan (born 1972) MP for Stirling (WA) (2004-2019)		Minister for Human Services; Minister Assisting the Prime Minister for Digital Transformation
Liberal (LNP)	John McVeigh (born 1965) MP for Groom (NSW) (2016-2020)		Minister for Regional Development, Territories and Local Government
National	Darren Chester (born 1967) MP for Gippsland (NSW) (2008-)		Minister for Veterans' Affairs; Minister for Defence Personnel; Minister Assisting the Prime Minister for the Centenary of ANZAC

=== Outer ministry ===
Party	Minister	Portrait	Offices
Liberal	Paul Fletcher (born 1965) MP for Bradfield (NSW) (2009-2025)		Minister for Urban Infrastructure and Cities
Liberal	Concetta Fierravanti-Wells (born 1960) Senator for New South Wales (2005-2022)		Minister for International Development and the Pacific
Liberal	Angus Taylor (born 1966) MP for Hume (NSW) (2013-)		Minister for Law Enforcement and Cyber Security
Liberal	Alan Tudge (born 1961) MP for Aston (VIC) (2010-2023)		Minister for Citizenship and Multicultural Affairs
Liberal	Craig Laundy (born 1971) MP for Reid (NSW) (2013-2019)		Minister for Small and Family Business, the Workplace and Deregulation
Liberal	Ken Wyatt (born 1952) MP for Hasluck (WA) (2010-2022)		Minister for Indigenous Health; Minister for Aged Care

=== Assistant ministers ===
Party	Minister	Portrait	Offices
Liberal	James McGrath (born 1974) Senator for Queensland (2014-)		Assistant Minister to the Prime Minister
National (LNP)	Keith Pitt (born 1969) MP for Hinkler (QLD) (2013-2025)		Assistant Minister to the Deputy Prime Minister
Liberal	Anne Ruston (born 1963) Senator for South Australia (2012-)		Assistant Minister for Agriculture and Water Resources
Liberal	Alex Hawke (born 1977) MP for Mitchell (NSW) (2007-)		Assistant Minister for Home Affairs
Liberal (LNP)	Karen Andrews (born 1960) MP for McPherson (QLD) (2010-2025)		Assistant Minister for Vocational Education and Skills
Liberal	Zed Seselja (born 1977) Senator for the Australian Capital Territory (2013-2022)		Assistant Minister for Science, Jobs and Innovation
Liberal (LNP)	Jane Prentice (born 1953) MP for Ryan (QLD) (2010-2019)		Assistant Minister for Social Services and Disability Services
National	Mark Coulton (born 1958) MP for Parkes (NSW) (2007-2025)		Assistant Minister for Trade, Tourism and Investment
Liberal	David Gillespie (born 1957) MP for Lyne (NSW) (2013-2025)		Assistant Minister for Children and Families
Liberal	Michael Sukkar (born 1981) MP for Deakin (VIC) (2013-2025)		Assistant Minister to the Treasurer
Liberal	Melissa Price (born 1963) MP for Durack (WA) (2013-)		Assistant Minister for the Environment
Liberal	David Coleman (born 1974) MP for Banks (NSW) (2013-2025)		Assistant Minister for Finance

== See also ==
- Turnbull government
- First Turnbull ministry
