= March 2026 National Party of Australia leadership election =

Australian political party election

2026 National Party of Australia leadership election
- 11 March 2026
- Leadership election

18 caucus members of the National Party 10 votes needed to win
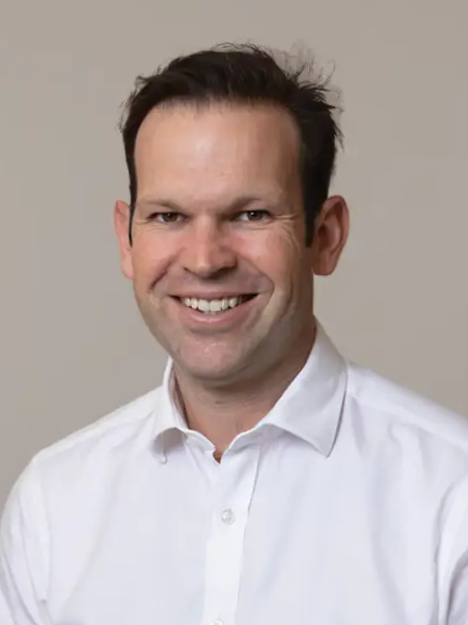

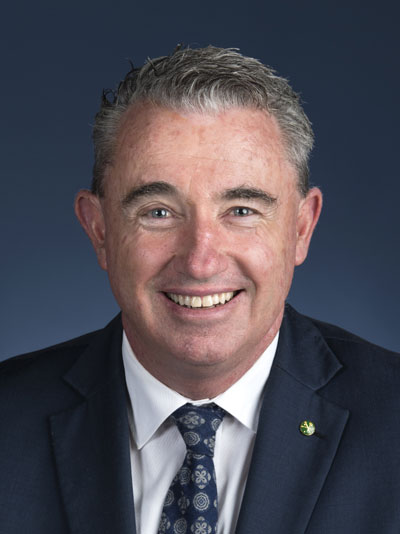

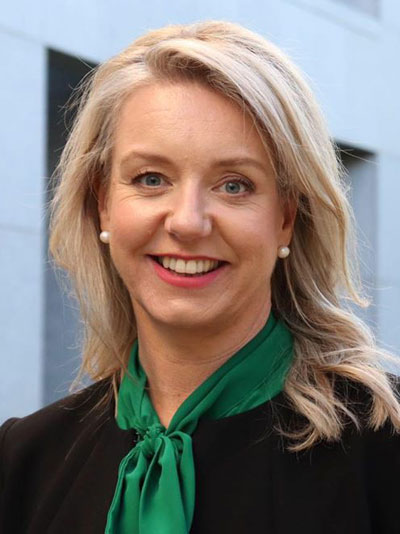
Candidate	Matt Canavan	Kevin Hogan	Bridget McKenzie
Caucus vote	≥10	<10	<10
Seat	Queensland (Senate)	Page (NSW)	Victoria (Senate)
Leader before election
David Littleproud
Elected Leader
Matt Canavan
- Deputy leadership election
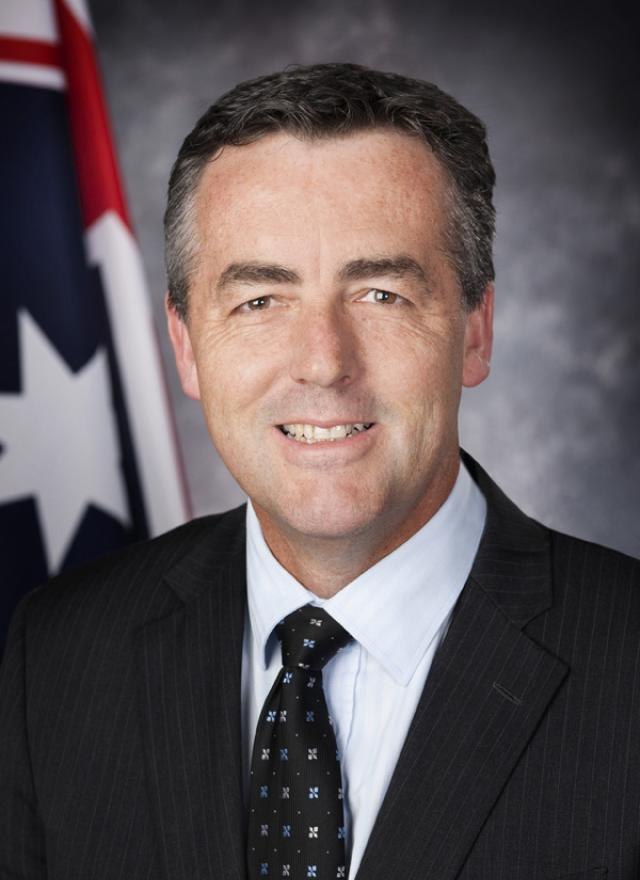
Candidate	Darren Chester
Caucus vote	Unopposed
Seat	Gippsland (Vic)
Deputy leader before election
Kevin Hogan
Elected Deputy leader
Darren Chester

A leadership election was held on 11 March 2026 to elect the leader of the National Party of Australia. Senator Matt Canavan was elected, replacing David Littleproud. The election was held after the resignation of Littleproud from the leadership. A deputy leadership election was held concurrently, with Darren Chester being elected.

== Background ==
On 10 March 2026, David Littleproud resigned from the leadership of the National Party, to the surprise of many. He stated his struggle with his leadership position since the 2025 federal election as "rough", describing himself as a punching bag. During Littleproud's tenure as leader, the Coalition was dissolved and re-united twice, deepening tensions between the Liberal and National parties.

== Candidates ==
Party members who declared their intention to run for the leadership included Senator Matt Canavan, incumbent deputy leader Kevin Hogan, and Senate Leader Bridget McKenzie. It was previously speculated that former leader Michael McCormack would run for the leadership. In the party room, McCormack did not decide to run for the leadership.

Victorian MP Darren Chester was the only party member who declared himself a candidate for the deputy leadership as a result of Hogan running for the leadership; Chester was elected unanimously.

== Results ==
Matt Canavan won the leadership election. Darren Chester was elected deputy leader to replace Kevin Hogan. Per longstanding party practice, the totals were not released.

== See also ==
- 2026 Liberal Party of Australia leadership spill
