= Madeleine King =

Australian politician

The Honourable Madeleine King MP
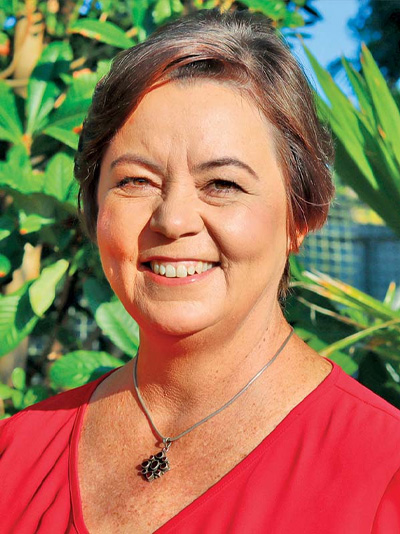
- Official portrait, 2022

Minister for Resources
- Incumbent
- Assumed office 1 June 2022
- Prime Minister: Anthony Albanese
- Preceded by: Keith Pitt

Minister for Northern Australia
- Incumbent
- Assumed office 1 June 2022
- Prime Minister: Anthony Albanese
- Preceded by: David Littleproud

Member of the Australian Parliament for Brand
- Incumbent
- Assumed office 2 July 2016
- Preceded by: Gary Gray

Personal details
- Born: Madeleine Mary Harvie Morris; 31 March 1973 (age 53) Calista, Western Australia, Australia
- Citizenship: Australian
- Party: Australian Labor Party
- Spouse: Jamie King
- Relations: John Morris (brother)
- Education: University of Western Australia
- Profession: Lawyer
- Website: www.madeleineking.com.au

Madeleine Mary Harvie King (née Morris; born 31 March 1973) is an Australian politician. She is a member of the Australian Labor Party (ALP) and has been Minister for Resources and Minister for Northern Australia in the Albanese government since June 2022. She has represented the Western Australian seat of Brand in the House of Representatives since 2016. She worked as a lawyer and political adviser before entering politics.

== Early life ==
King was born on 31 March 1973 in Calista, Western Australia. She is the youngest of five children born to Diana Eve Pizer and John Harvie Morris. Her father was born in England and served in the Royal Navy, moving to Australia to work at the Kwinana Oil Refinery. Her mother owned a drapery shop in Rockingham.

King grew up in the suburb of Shoalwater, attending Safety Bay Primary School, Rockingham Beach Primary School, and Safety Bay Senior High School. She started an arts degree at the University of Western Australia (UWA), but subsequently moved to Melbourne to study aerospace engineering at RMIT University. She returned to Perth after a year and completed a Bachelor of Laws at UWA.

King worked as a commercial lawyer in private practice from 1997 to 2005, working in England for a period following her marriage. She then joined UWA's legal department as a research contracts lawyer (2005–2008), later working as chief of staff to the vice-chancellor Alan Robson (2008–2011) and principal advisor of strategic projects (2012–2013). She oversaw the university's centenary celebrations in 2013. Immediately prior to entering parliament she was the chief operating officer of the Perth USAsia Centre, a think tank based at UWA.

== Politics ==
King was a ministerial adviser to federal Labor MP Gary Gray from 2011 to 2012, and also advised WA federal government ministers Stephen Smith and Chris Evans during the Commonwealth Heads of Government Meeting 2011 in Perth.

In March 2016, King won ALP preselection unopposed for the Division of Brand, following Gray's retirement. She retained the seat for the ALP at the 2016 federal election, increasing the swing to Labor from a nominal 3.7 points to 7.7 points, making Brand one of Labor's safest federal seats in Western Australia. She is a member of the Labor Right faction.

In June 2018, King was selected to fill a vacant place on the opposition frontbench, replacing Tim Hammond. She was given the consumer affairs portfolio and also made an assistant minister in the small business and resources portfolios. After the 2019 election she was appointed Shadow Minister for Trade and Shadow Minister for Resources. In March 2021, King stated that the ALP would oppose a moratorium on new coal mines and that "so long as international markets want to buy Australian coal, which is high quality, then they will be able to".

Following the ALP's victory at the 2022 election, King was appointed to cabinet as Minister for Resources and Minister for Northern Australia in the Albanese government.

== Personal life ==
King is married to Jamie King. She has represented Western Australia in Masters (older age) hockey. Her brother is actor John Morris who appeared on Home & Away and Neighbours.

Parliament of Australia
Preceded by Gary Gray	Member for Brand; 2016–present	Incumbent
Political offices
Preceded by David Littleproud	Minister for Northern Australia; 2022–present	Incumbent
Preceded by Keith Pitt	Minister for Resources; 2022–present	Incumbent
