= Matt Canavan =

Australian politician (born 1980)

Senator the Honourable Matt Canavan
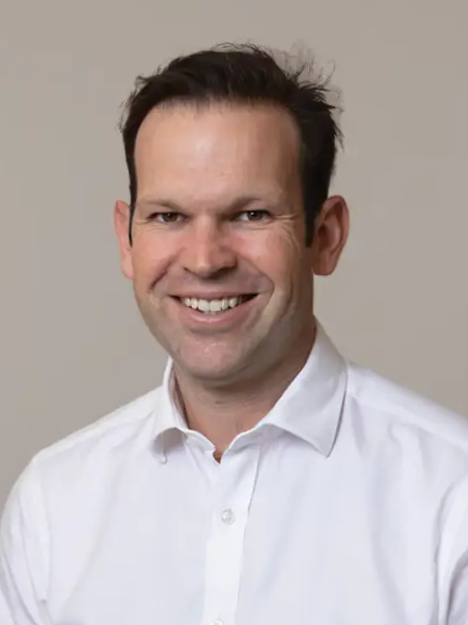

Leader of the National Party
- Incumbent
- Assumed office 11 March 2026
- Deputy: Darren Chester
- Preceded by: David Littleproud

Shadow Minister for Trade, Investment and Tourism
- Incumbent
- Assumed office 16 March 2026
- Leader: Angus Taylor
- Preceded by: Kevin Hogan; Michaelia Cash (acting)
Other positions
Minister for Resources and Northern Australia
In office 27 October 2017 – 3 February 2020
Prime Minister	Malcolm Turnbull; Scott Morrison
Preceded by	Barnaby Joyce (acting)
Succeeded by	Keith Pitt
In office 19 July 2016 – 25 July 2017
Prime Minister	Malcolm Turnbull
Preceded by	Josh Frydenberg (as Minister for Resources, Energy and Northern Australia)
Succeeded by	Barnaby Joyce (acting)
Minister for Northern Australia
In office 18 February 2016 – 19 July 2016
Prime Minister	Malcolm Turnbull
Preceded by	Josh Frydenberg (as Minister for Resources, Energy and Northern Australia)
Succeeded by	Himself (as Minister for Northern Australia)
Deputy Leader of the Nationals in the Senate
In office 2 July 2019 – 27 September 2022
Preceded by	Fiona Nash
Succeeded by	Susan McDonald

Senator for Queensland
- Incumbent
- Assumed office 1 July 2014
- Preceded by: Ron Boswell

Personal details
- Born: Matthew James Canavan; 17 December 1980 (age 45) Southport, Queensland, Australia
- Party: National (LNP)
- Other political affiliations: Coalition
- Education: University of Queensland
- Occupation: Economist
- Website: Personal website Party website

Matthew James Canavan (born 17 December 1980) is an Australian politician who has served as the leader of the National Party of Australia since 2026. He has been a senator for Queensland since 2014, and served as a minister in the Turnbull and Morrison governments from 2016 to 2020.

Born in Southport, Queensland, Canavan graduated from the University of Queensland with bachelor's degrees in arts and economics. He then worked for Barnaby Joyce from 2010 to 2013. He was first elected to the Senate at the 2013 federal election, running on the Liberal National Party ticket in Queensland.

Canavan was appointed minister for Northern Australia in February 2016 and was elevated to cabinet after the 2016 election with the additional role of minister for resources. In July 2017, amid a wider parliamentary eligibility crisis, he resigned from cabinet after he found he might hold Italian citizenship by descent in violation of section 44 of the constitution. He was reappointed to cabinet in October 2017 after the High Court ruled that he was not an Italian citizen.

In February 2020, Canavan resigned again from cabinet to support Joyce in his unsuccessful bid for National Party leadership. After the 2025 election, he unsuccessfully challenged David Littleproud in a leadership spill. He was elected party leader in March 2026 following Littleproud's resignation as leader.

== Early life ==
Canavan was born on 17 December 1980 in Southport, a suburb of the Gold Coast. He is of Italian descent; his mother's parents were born in Lozzo di Cadore, in the Italian province of Belluno. His father Bryan worked as a manager at Woolworths and sales representative with Nestlé. In 2007 Bryan was convicted and sentenced to seven years imprisonment for embezzling $1.6 million from the large food and beverage company. Canavan's mother Maria worked as a teller with the Commonwealth Bank. His brother John is a mining executive, and managing director of Winfield Energy, which had a significant interest in the Rolleston coal mine until 2020.

Canavan grew up in Slacks Creek in the City of Logan. He attended Chisholm Catholic College, where he was active in Edmund Rice Camps. While at University, Canavan identified as a communist until a political disagreement with volunteers for the International Socialist Organisation. He holds the degrees of Bachelor of Arts and Bachelor of Economics (Hons.) from the University of Queensland. After graduating from university he moved to Canberra to work at the Productivity Commission. He was a senior research economist (2003–2008) and later director (2009–2010), briefly moving to Brisbane as a senior executive at KPMG (2008–2009). From 2010 to 2013, Canavan served as chief of staff to Senator Barnaby Joyce, at the time serving as shadow minister for finance. He later rejected an offer to move to Andrew Robb's office, despite Joyce's demotion to a less senior portfolio.

== Political career ==
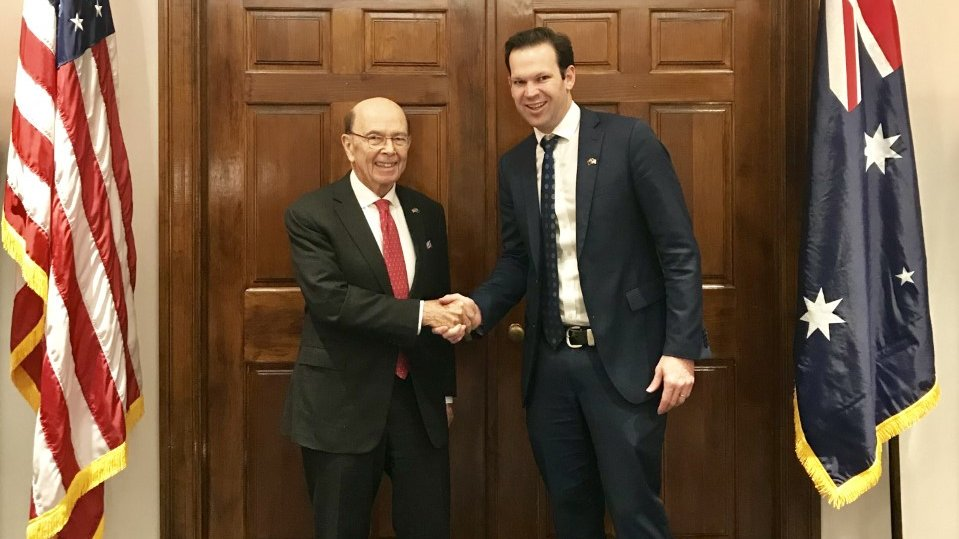
Canavan in November 2019 with U.S. Secretary of Commerce Wilbur Ross

Canavan was elected to the Senate as a member of the Liberal National Party, representing Queensland at the 2013 federal election for the term beginning 1 July 2014. He sits with the National Party in the Senate, although he had been a member of the Liberal club during his latter days at UQ.

In the first Turnbull ministry, Canavan served as the minister for Northern Australia between 18 February and 19 July 2016. He was the first member of cabinet born in the 1980s.

With the reelection of the Turnbull government in 2016, Canavan was elevated to the Cabinet, becoming minister for resources and Northern Australia in the second Turnbull ministry. He briefly resigned from the Cabinet between July and October 2016 amid his High Court citizenship challenge.

On 3 February 2020, he resigned again from Cabinet to support Barnaby Joyce in his unsuccessful bid for National Party leadership. He also cited his failure to declare his membership of the North Queensland Cowboys, as the Northern Australia Infrastructure Facility within his Northern Australia portfolio, approved a $20 million loan for the Cowboys to build a training centre next to the North Queensland Stadium in Townsville. He denied it was a breach of ministerial standards as under the North Australia Infrastructure Facility Act, he had no power to approve loans but could only reject them.

After his resignation from the Cabinet, he remained as deputy leader of the Nationals in the Senate, along with Bridget McKenzie as leader, as the other three Nationals senators were first-termers.

Canavan has served on the "Inquiry into the destruction of 46,000 year old caves at the Juukan Gorge in the Pilbara region of Western Australia", which delivered its interim report in December 2020.

Canavan unsuccessfully challenged David Littleproud for leadership following the 2025 Australian federal election in the 2025 National Party of Australia leadership spill.

=== High Court citizenship challenge (2017) ===
In 2006, Canavan's mother had registered him as an "Italian resident abroad" with the Italian consulate in Brisbane. Canavan stated that he had been unaware of this until his mother had informed him of it following the resignation of two Greens senators over their dual citizenship. The government took the view that he was not in breach of the Constitution, as the registration had not been made with his knowledge or consent. Canavan resigned from cabinet, but not from Parliament, as he had not yet been given a definitive legal view on the matter.

Initially, Canavan accepted that he had Italian citizenship. He then renounced it, effective 8 August 2017. On the same day, on a government motion with all-party support, the Senate resolved to refer the matters of Senators Scott Ludlam, Larissa Waters and Canavan to the High Court as Court of Disputed Returns. The Attorney-General indicated that the Commonwealth would argue, in favour of Cavanan, that s 44(i) requires a personal acknowledgement of the connection, which had not occurred. Canavan spoke in support of the referral, while stating that he did not believe he was in breach of s 44(i), and said that he would not be voting in the Senate until his position was determined by the Court. Later, four other members of the federal parliament were referred to the High Court, which heard the seven cases together.

In the High Court, government lawyers argued for Canavan and others that s 44(i) requires some personal acknowledgement of another citizenship, which had not occurred; in its judgment on 27 October 2017, the Court rejected this interpretation of the sub-section. For Canavan, it was argued in addition that his registration as an "Italian resident abroad" in 2006 had been incorrect in supposing that he was an Italian citizen and that, although a change in Italian citizenship law when he had been two years old could appear to have conferred Italian citizenship upon him, it could not be shown to have done so. The Court accepted these points and held that Canavan had never been a citizen of Italy; accordingly, he had been validly elected.

=== Leader of the National Party (2026–present) ===
On 10 March 2026, Leader of the National Party David Littleproud announced his resignation as leader of the National Party, citing stresses from the Coalition split earlier in the year. A leadership ballot was held on the morning of 11 March, in which Canavan was elected leader.

In October 2026, after attending the Conservative Political Action Conference (CPAC) in Brisbane, Canavan was photographed alongside multiple far-right influencers including neo-Nazi advocate Andre Mamet.

In November 2026, Canavan announced his intention to seek preselection to run for the division of Capricornia at the next Australian federal election. The incumbent MP, Michelle Landry, will retire before the next election. Canavan commented that he is "happy to sacrifice potentially [his] own political future" to change government. Angus Taylor and other Coalition MPs expressed support for Canavan's move from the Senate.

== Political positions ==
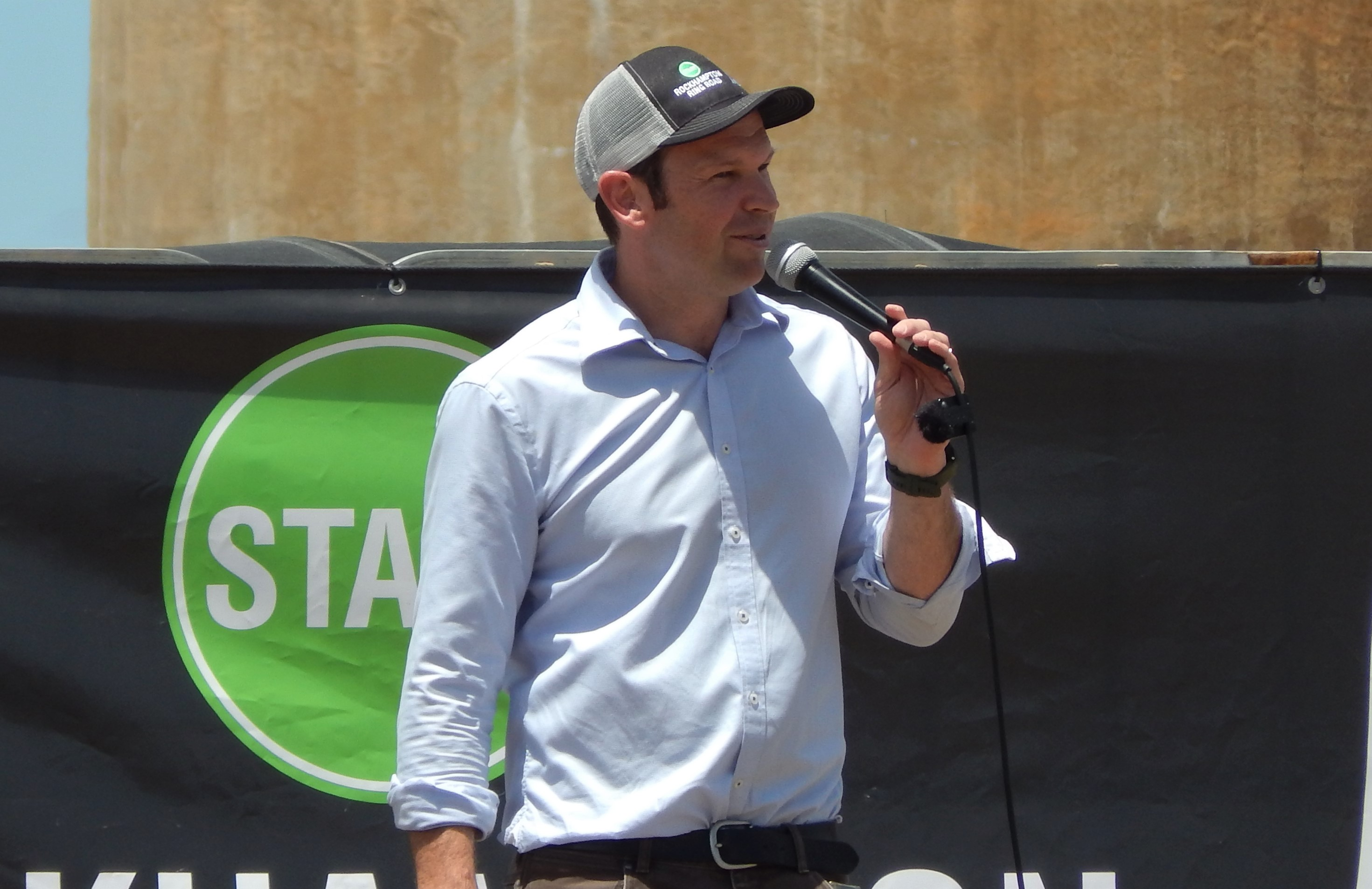
Matt Canavan at a Start Rockhampton Ring Road rally, 2022

Canavan's political positions have been described as conservative and far-right aligned.

=== Climate change ===
Canavan is a climate change denier and a prominent supporter of fossil fuels, particularly coal, and has strongly opposed investment in renewable energy. He has been referred to as one of the major players in the LNP split over climate and energy policy, frequently advocating for more coal power plants, despite their higher costs and higher emissions than alternative energies.

Canavan has rejected that climate change contributed to the catastrophic 2019–20 Australian bushfire season, despite evidence to the contrary. His views have been rebuked by climate scientists and other members of Parliament, including Nationals MP Darren Chester.

In response to a protest in 2018 where high school students walked out of class to protest the Australian government's inaction on climate change, he responded "I want kids to be at school to learn about how you build a mine, how you do geology, how you drill for oil and gas". He also stated "The best thing you'll learn about going to a protest is how to join the dole queue." He strongly opposes the teaching of climate change in schools, stating that children are "more interested in PewDiePie than politics", "Fortnite than fostering revolution" and that the only mining they get involved in is in Minecraft.

Canavan is a critic of net zero emissions targets, labelling them "a failed agenda".

=== Economics ===
On economic issues, Canavan supports interventionism and is "of the economic populist school".

=== Social issues ===
Canavan holds conservative views on social issues. He opposed same-sex marriage in the lead-up to the 2017 marriage law plebiscite. In 2017, when Cory Bernardi moved a motion to ban abortion on gender grounds, Canavan was one of ten MPs who voted for the motion, which was defeated with 36 votes against.

In 2024, Canavan voted against Australian Government's proposed legislation to ban children under 16 from social media. He was the only National who voted against it.

==== Black Lives Matter ====
In October 2020, he shared a picture on Facebook and Twitter that showed a vehicle with a sticker that stated "Black Coal Matters" on it, intended as a parody of the American social movement Black Lives Matter. This was posted in the wake of major racial tension following the murder of George Floyd at the hands of the Minneapolis Police Department. Canavan was met with backlash on social media. He later defended the post as a "joke", and declared that the Black Lives Matter movement deserves "ridicule".

==== Comments on the Wiggles ====
In August 2021, Canavan received widespread criticism when he took issue with the announcement that the children's entertainment group the Wiggles had recruited a further four members, who were ethnically diverse, a move he perceived as "woke", saying in an interview with The Australian newspaper: "The Wiggles are free to do what they like. It was nice while it lasted. But you go woke, you go broke."

==== Gender ====
Canavan said that Australia should copy a 2025 executive order signed by Donald Trump which stated that the United States federal government will only recognize two genders, male and female.

=== COVID-19 pandemic ===
In November 2021, Canavan was one of five Coalition senators who crossed the floor to vote for Pauline Hanson's proposed COVID-19 Vaccination Status (Prevention of Discrimination) Bill 2021, which would have prevented people who willingly refused the COVID-19 vaccine from being subject to any kind of mandate or consequences.

His support of the bill drew criticism and accusations of being anti-vaccine. Canavan called for the rollout of the AstraZeneca vaccine to be halted, contrary to the policy of his own government and views of his colleagues. In September 2023, Canavan promoted a conspiracy theory that COVID-19 vaccination increases the risk of stillbirths, citing Leading Report, an American website known for promoting misinformation.

== Personal life ==
Canavan met his wife, Andrea, at university while volunteering with Edmund Rice Camps. As of 2017, they had five children together and lived in Yeppoon. They also own a property in Barmaryee and a house in Macquarie, Australian Capital Territory.

Canavan has said he "rediscovered" his Roman Catholic faith while preparing for his wedding.

Political offices
Preceded by Josh Frydenberg as Minister for Resources, Energy and Northern Australia	Minister for Northern Australia; 2016	Next: Himself as Minister for Resources and Northern Australia
Preceded by Josh Frydenberg as Minister for Resources, Energy and Northern Australia	Minister for Resources and Northern Australia; 2016–2017	Next: Barnaby Joyce
Preceded by Barnaby Joyce	Minister for Resources and Northern Australia; 2017–2020	Next: Keith Pitt
