= Edmund Rice Camps =

Children's camps associated with Christian Brothers

Edmund Rice Camps (often referred to as ERC or Eddie Rice Camps) is a charitable volunteer organisation closely associated with the Congregation of Christian Brothers, and inspired by the work of Edmund Ignatius Rice.

== History ==
The first two 'Edmund Rice' camps took place at Parade College in Melbourne, Australia, in January 1981, as a form of community outreach for the students of Parade, and as a way of sharing the extensive resources of Parade left unused during the Australian summer. These first camps catered for two groups of children: one for at-risk boys from Melbourne, and another camp for refugee children who had escaped with their families from communist Vietnam.

Persons associated with the Christian Brothers helped to spread the concept of these camps to other states of Australia and overseas. The first Edmund Rice Camp in Tasmania took place in January 1985, and the first beyond Australian shores was held near Dunedin, New Zealand in May 1991.

== Today ==
Relatively autonomous Edmund Rice Camps organisations are now active in every state of Australia as well as in New Zealand, South Africa, Ireland, England, and the United States. Camps funded by these permanent groups have taken place in Kenya and Tanzania, and the first Edmund Rice Camp in Kolkata, India took place at the end of November 2006. As of October 2008, ERC Tasmania was fundraising to support a similar initiative in Ghana.

== Organisation ==
The status of Edmund Rice Camps worldwide varies, for there is no worldwide structure, but rather a series of localised and largely independent volunteer groups. The majority of these organisations are incorporated, not-for-profit groups (and hence are not owned by the Christian Brothers as such). There are exceptions such as the Edmund Rice Camps in Townsville, Queensland, where ERC is a ministry of the Diocese of Townsville. In countries where the movement is tiny or quite informal, the whole impetus for the running of these children's camps is in the hands of individual Christian Brothers and Edmund Rice Volunteers and has no independent legal status. 'Edmund Rice Camps' in Tanzania and Kenya, where the Christian Brothers are highly active, are two examples.

Another exception are the camps based in County Cork, Ireland. Five Irish camps (namely those in Dublin, Kilkenny, Waterford, Newry and Omagh) co-operate on a national level through a National Executive Committee working closely with the Christian Brothers, the Cork "Edmund Rice Action Camps" are run under the auspices of the Presentation Brothers, the other congregation founded by Edmund Rice.
