= David Littleproud =

Australian politician (born 1976)

The Honourable David Littleproud MP
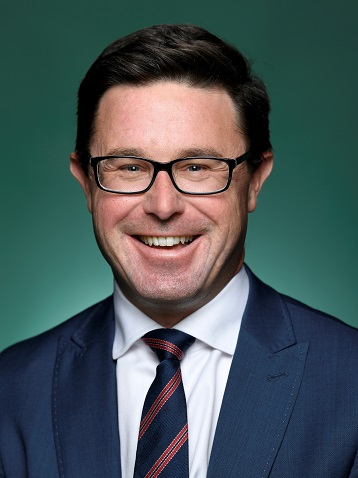
- Official portrait, 2021

Leader of the National Party
- In office 30 May 2022 – 10 March 2026
- Deputy: Perin Davey; Kevin Hogan
- Preceded by: Barnaby Joyce
- Succeeded by: Matt Canavan

Deputy Leader of the National Party
- In office 4 February 2020 – 30 May 2022
- Leader: Michael McCormack; Barnaby Joyce
- Preceded by: Bridget McKenzie
- Succeeded by: Perin Davey
Ministerial positions 2017–2022
Minister for Agriculture and Northern Australia
In office 2 July 2021 – 23 May 2022
Prime Minister	Scott Morrison
Preceded by	Himself (Agriculture); Keith Pitt (Northern Australia)
Succeeded by	Madeleine King (Northern Australia); Murray Watt (Agriculture)
Minister for Agriculture, Drought and Emergency Management
In office 6 February 2020 – 2 July 2021
Prime Minister	Scott Morrison
Preceded by	Bridget McKenzie (Agriculture); Himself (Drought and Emergency Management)
Succeeded by	Himself (Agriculture); Bridget McKenzie (Emergency Management)
Minister for Water Resources, Drought, Rural Finance, Natural Disaster and Emergency Management
In office 29 May 2019 – 6 February 2020
Prime Minister	Scott Morrison
Preceded by	Himself (Water Resources); Linda Reynolds (Emergency Management)
Succeeded by	Keith Pitt (Water)
Minister for Agriculture and Water Resources
In office 20 December 2017 – 29 May 2019
Prime Minister	Malcolm Turnbull; Scott Morrison
Preceded by	Barnaby Joyce
Succeeded by	Bridget McKenzie (Agriculture); Himself (Water Resources)

Member of the Australian Parliament for Maranoa
- Incumbent
- Assumed office 2 July 2016
- Preceded by: Bruce Scott

Personal details
- Born: David Kelly Littleproud; 4 September 1976 (age 50) Chinchilla, Queensland, Australia
- Party: National (LNP)
- Other political affiliations: Coalition
- Parent: Brian Littleproud
- Education: Chinchilla State High School; Toowoomba Grammar School
- Website: Official website

David Kelly Littleproud (born 4 September 1976) is an Australian politician who was the leader of the National Party from 2022 to 2026. He has been the member of parliament (MP) for the Queensland division of Maranoa since 2016. He previously served as a cabinet minister in the Turnbull and Morrison governments.

Littleproud grew up in Chinchilla, Queensland, the son of former state government minister Brian Littleproud. He worked as an agribusiness banker with NAB and Suncorp before entering politics. He was first elected to the House of Representatives in 2016. Littleproud was appointed to cabinet the following year, subsequently serving as Minister for Agriculture and Water Resources (2017–2019), Water Resources, Drought, Rural Finance, Natural Disaster and Emergency Management (2019–2020), Agriculture, Drought and Emergency Management (2020–2021), and Agriculture and Northern Australia (2021–2022).

He was elected deputy leader of the Nationals in February 2020 under Michael McCormack. He retained the position under Barnaby Joyce and successfully challenged Joyce for the leadership following the Coalition's defeat at the 2022 election. Littleproud led the National party at the 2025 election, and through two temporary break ups of the Coalition in 2025 and 2026, before resigning the leadership on 10 March 2026.

== Early life ==
Littleproud was born on 4 September 1976 in Chinchilla, Queensland. His grandfather George Littleproud served on the Chinchilla Shire Council, while his father Brian Littleproud was a state Nationals MP and government minister. After entering parliament himself he recalled that he had handed out political flyers for his father from the age of six.

Littleproud attended Chinchilla State High School and Toowoomba Grammar School. As a teenager he worked as a "cotton chipper", removing weeds from cotton fields. As of 2019, he was one of the two members of the national cabinet who had no tertiary qualification.

Littleproud was an agribusiness banker before entering politics. He spent 17 years with the National Australia Bank (NAB), including 12 years based in Warwick, Queensland, as district manager (agribusiness and commercial). He joined Suncorp in 2011 as executive manager (business and agribusiness banking) for South West Queensland. As of 2018, Littleproud was the owner of Mr Rental Southern Downs, a rent-to-buy business that employed four people.

== Politics ==
=== Early career ===
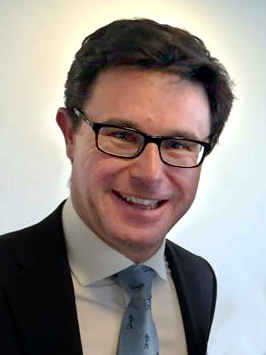
Littleproud in Brazil in 2018

In October 2015, Littleproud was preselected by the Liberal National Party of Queensland as the party's candidate in the federal seat of Maranoa, a safely conservative seat in Queensland's vast western outback, following the retirement of incumbent Nationals MP Bruce Scott. He easily retained Maranoa for the National Party at the 2016 federal election.

Within 18 months, Littleproud was elevated directly to cabinet as Minister for Agriculture and Water Resources, following a reshuffle of the second Turnbull ministry. He was sworn in at Government House in Canberra on 20 December 2017.

In November 2018, Littleproud was additionally appointed Minister Assisting the Prime Minister for Drought Preparation and Response. Following the Morrison government's return at the 2019 federal election, his title was changed to Minister for Water Resources, Drought, Rural Finance, Natural Disaster and Emergency Management. He re-assumed the agriculture portfolio following Bridget McKenzie's resignation in February 2020 following the Sports rorts affair (2020), becoming Minister for Agriculture, Drought and Emergency Management.

=== Deputy leadership (2020-2022) ===
Littleproud was viewed as a potential candidate to replace Barnaby Joyce as National Party leader in February 2018. The position was eventually won by Michael McCormack. On 4 February 2020, following Bridget McKenzie's resignation, he defeated Keith Pitt and David Gillespie to become deputy leader of the National Party. The ballot for the deputy leadership was held simultaneously with a leadership spill in which McCormack defeated a challenge by Joyce. It was subsequently suggested that Littleproud could emerge as a compromise candidate if conflict continues between supporters of McCormack and Joyce.

=== Leadership of National Party (2022-2026) ===
Littleproud challenged incumbent Nationals Party leader Barnaby Joyce along with Darren Chester in a three-way contest for the leadership of the party on 30 May 2022, after the incumbent Coalition government lost office to the Labor opposition at the 2022 federal election. The Nationals increased their parliamentary numbers at the election, however Joyce's unpopularity in metropolitan electorates was attributed as a factor in the loss of some Liberal seats. Littleproud was elected to replace Joyce as leader of the National Party, with Perin Davey as deputy. The Nationals, per longstanding policy, did not release the results.

Following his election as Nationals leader, Littleproud assumed the agriculture portfolio in Peter Dutton's shadow cabinet.

Under Littleproud's leadership of the Nationals, The Nationals came out as being opposed to the Voice to Parliament, becoming the first major party against it. The Nationals also abandoned its support for net zero by 2050. In both cases, the Liberals would later follow Nationals positions.

Littleproud led the Nationals into the 2025 federal election where they neither lost nor won any additional seats, yet nearly won the previously safe Labor seat of Bendigo after the Nationals candidate overtook the Liberals for second place and Labor suffered a 9.7 percent swing.

Littleproud was challenged for the leadership by senator Matt Canavan on 13 May 2025; on the same day, it was announced he had retained his post. Kevin Hogan was elected by the party room to replace outgoing Senator Perin Davey as the Nationals Deputy Leader. National Party rules dictate that all leadership positions are declared vacant after an election, regardless of the result.

==== Coalition break ups ====
On 20 May 2025, Littleproud announced that the Nationals would not renew the Coalition agreement with the Liberals. Littleproud told new Liberal leader Sussan Ley that while the Nationals will be on the crossbench, "I gave her the commitment that I'll work with her every day to help to try to rebuild the relationship to the point we can re-enter a coalition before the next election". On 28 May 2025, the Liberals and Nationals announced a renewed Coalition agreement following agreement on several policy areas that the Nationals had advocated, and a new shadow ministry was revealed with Littleproud as Shadow Minister for Agriculture.

On 21 January 2026, after a vote on the Combatting Antisemitism, Hate and Extremism (Criminal and Migration Laws) Bill 2026, all Nationals frontbenchers including Littleproud resigned from the Shadow Ministry in 'solidarity', after the resignation of Senators Susan McDonald, Bridget McKenzie, and Ross Cadell, for voting against the official Coalition position. The following day, Littleproud announced that the Nationals would be leaving the Coalition, citing that "The Nationals cannot be part of a shadow ministry while Sussan Ley is the Leader".

Littleproud's leadership was unsuccessfully challenged in the 2026 National Party of Australia leadership spill, against Colin Boyce.

The two parties reunified the Coalition on 8 February 2026.

==== Resignation ====
On 10 March 2026, Littleproud announced his resignation from his position as the leader of the Nationals, citing himself as "buggered." However, he stated his intention to remain in Parliament as MP for Maranoa.

== Political positions ==
=== Murray-Darling Basin ===
On 14 February 2018, Labor and the Greens voted to disallow a mechanism in the Murray Darling Basin Plan that would reduce the amount of water being returned to the environment in the northern basin.

The disallowance motion triggered a crisis in basin states when New South Wales and Victoria pledged to abandon the Plan as a result. It was widely considered the withdrawal of the two largest states would see the Basin Plan dismantled after it had taken more than a century to strike the agreement. On 7 May 2018, in the lead up to a second disallowance motion that would have blocked 36 environmental water savings projects, Littleproud struck a deal with Labor that both secured the works in question and the 70GL recovery reduction for Northern Basin farmers which had previously been disallowed. This effectively resurrected the Murray-Darling Basin Plan by reassuring Basin states the Plan would be fulfilled as agreed in 2012. In addition to securing the Basin Plan, Littleproud delivered enhanced protections for Aboriginal people in the Basin. This included an Indigenous position on the MDBA board and a world-first $40 million indigenous fund so Aboriginal communities could buy water for either cultural or economic purposes.

=== Regional Investment Corporation ===
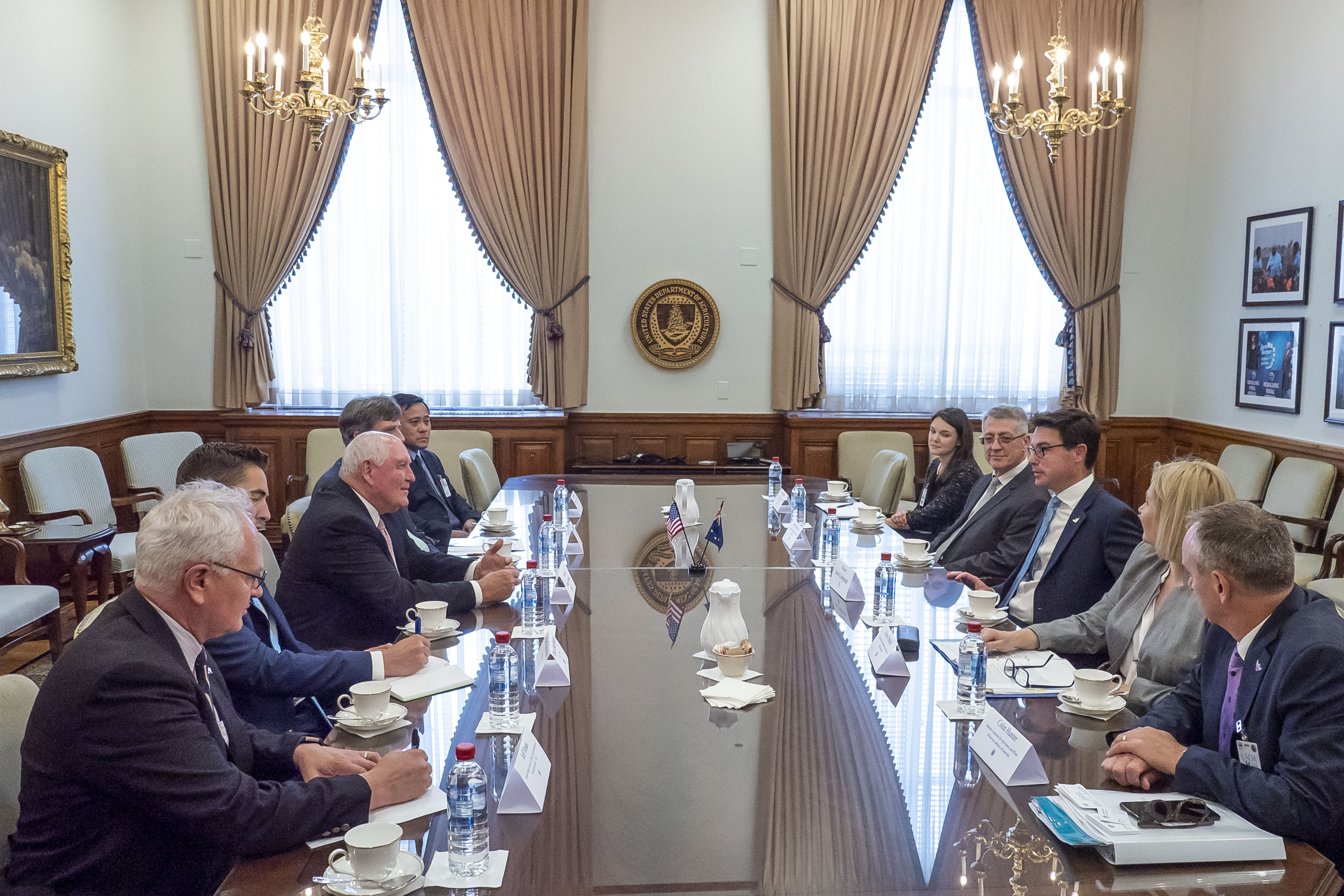
Littleproud at a July 2018 meeting with U.S. Secretary of Agriculture Sonny Perdue

Littleproud successfully negotiated with the Senate crossbench for passage of legislation establishing the Regional Investment Corporation. On 6 February 2018 the new laws passed the Senate, breaking a political deadlock that had dragged on months. On 16 May 2018 it was announced that the RIC's headquarters would be set up in Orange, New South Wales.

=== LGBT rights ===
In December 2017, Littleproud was one of four members of the House of Representatives to vote against the Marriage Amendment (Definition and Religious Freedoms) Bill 2017, which legalised same-sex marriage in Australia. Littleproud had pledged to vote according to the majority response of his electorate of Maranoa in the Australian Marriage Law Postal Survey, and Maranoa recorded a result of 56.1% against legalising same sex marriage.

In 2023 he called on One Nation leader Pauline Hanson to take action against Mark Latham (One Nation's leader in New South Wales at the time) for a tweet that contained vulgar and homophobic language targeted at Alex Greenwich, a gay man who is the independent member for Sydney.

After United States president Donald Trump signed an executive order which stated that the United States federal government will only recognise two genders, male and female, Littleproud called on Australia to adopt a similar policy. Peter Dutton dismissed Littleproud's comments saying that the LNP "does not have any plans to change [their] position in relation to that issue."

=== Climate change and renewable energy ===
In 2018, Littleproud told The Guardian "I believe the climate is changing. Whether it is manmade or not, I don't really care," however by 2023 Littleproud described renewable energy as a 'virus' and criticised the Albanese government of running a "reckless race" toward renewables. Littleproud has voted consistently against greater action on climate change, including against net zero emission agreements and the Paris Climate Agreement.

In June 2024, Littleproud opposed the establishment of a wind farm offshore off the Illawarra, and committed to a 'cap' on renewable energy investment under a Liberal-National government.

== Personal life ==
Littleproud has three children. He and his wife Sarah announced their separation in 2019, ending a 20-year marriage. He is currently married to his second wife Amelia Littleproud.

== See also ==
- Political families of Australia

Parliament of Australia
Preceded by Bruce Scott	Member for Maranoa; 2016–present	Incumbent
Political offices
Preceded by Barnaby Joyce	Minister for Agriculture and Water Resources; 2017–2019	Succeeded by Bridget McKenzie (Agriculture); Himself (Water Resources)
Preceded by Himself as Minister for Agriculture and Water Resources	Minister for Water Resources; 2019–2020	Succeeded by Keith Pitt as Minister for Resources and Water
Preceded by Bridget McKenzie (Agriculture); Himself (Water Resources)	Minister for Agriculture, Drought and Emergency Management; 2020–2021	Succeeded by Himself (Agriculture); Bridget McKenzie (Emergency Management)
Preceded by Himself (Agriculture); Keith Pitt (Northern Australia)	Minister for Agriculture and Northern Australia; 2021–2022	Succeeded by Madeleine King (Northern Australia); Murray Watt (Agriculture)
Party political offices
Preceded by Bridget McKenzie	Deputy Leader of the National Party; 2020–2022	Succeeded by Perin Davey
Preceded by Barnaby Joyce	Leader of the National Party; 2022–present	Incumbent
