= Minister for Northern Australia =

Australian cabinet position

- Commonwealth Coat of Arms

- Flag of Australia

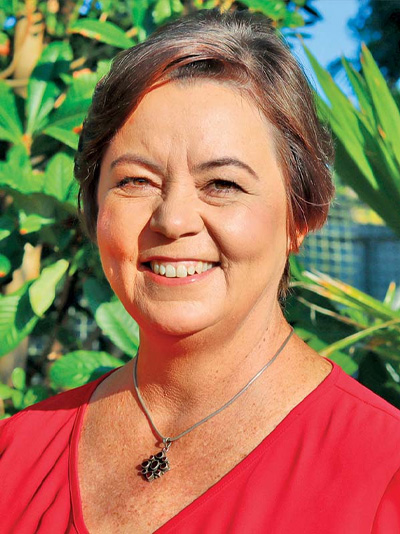
- Incumbent; Madeleine King since 1 June 2022
- Department of Infrastructure, Transport, Regional Development, Communications, Sport and the Arts
- Style: The Honourable
- Appointer: Governor-General on the recommendation of the Prime Minister of Australia
- Inaugural holder: Kep Enderby (as Minister for the Northern Territory)
- Formation: 19 December 1972
- Website: minister.infrastructure.gov.au/m-king

The Minister for Northern Australia is an Australian Government cabinet position which is currently held by Madeleine King following the swearing in of the full Albanese ministry on 1 June 2022.

In the Government of Australia, the minister administers this portfolio through the Department of Infrastructure, Transport, Regional Development, Communications, Sport and the Arts.

== List of ministers for Northern Australia ==
The following individuals have been appointed as Minister for Northern Australia, or any of its precedent titles:

Order	Minister	Party	Prime Minister	Title	Term start	Term end	Term in office
1	Kep Enderby	Labor	Whitlam	Minister for the Northern Territory^{1}	19 December 1972	19 October 1973	304 days
2	Rex Patterson^{1}	Labor	Whitlam	Minister for the Northern Territory^{1}	19 October 1973	6 June 1975	2 years, 2 days
2	Rex Patterson^{1}	Labor	Whitlam	Minister for Northern Australia	6 June 1975	21 October 1975	2 years, 2 days
3	Paul Keating	Labor	Whitlam	Minister for Northern Australia	21 October 1975	11 November 1975	21 days
4	Ian Sinclair	National Country	Fraser	Minister for Northern Australia	11 November 1975	22 December 1975	41 days
5	Evan Adermann	National Country	Fraser	Minister for the Northern Territory	22 December 1975	28 September 1978	2 years, 280 days
6	Bob Collins	Labor	Hawke	Minister Assisting the Prime Minister for Northern Australia	4 April 1990	20 December 1991	2 years, 53 days
6	Bob Collins	Labor	Keating	Minister Assisting the Prime Minister for Northern Australia	20 December 1991	27 May 1992	2 years, 53 days
7	Ben Humphreys	Labor	Keating	Minister Assisting the Prime Minister for Northern Australia	27 May 1992	24 March 1993	301 days
8	Josh Frydenberg	Liberal	Turnbull	Minister for Resources, Energy and Northern Australia	21 September 2015	18 February 2016	150 days
9	Matt Canavan	Liberal National	Turnbull	Minister for Northern Australia	18 February 2016	19 July 2016	1 year, 157 days
9	Matt Canavan	Liberal National	Turnbull	Minister for Resources and Northern Australia	19 July 2016	25 July 2017	1 year, 157 days
10	Barnaby Joyce	National	Turnbull	Minister for Resources and Northern Australia	25 July 2017	27 October 2017	94 days
(9)	Matt Canavan	Liberal National	Turnbull	Minister for Resources and Northern Australia	27 October 2017	24 August 2018	2 years, 99 days
(9)	Matt Canavan	Liberal National	Morrison	Minister for Resources and Northern Australia	24 August 2018	3 February 2020	2 years, 99 days
11	Keith Pitt; Scott Morrison	Liberal National	Morrison	Minister for Resources, Water and Northern Australia	6 February 2020	2 July 2021	1 year, 146 days
12	David Littleproud	Liberal National	Morrison	Minister for Agriculture and Northern Australia	2 July 2021	23 May 2022	325 days
13	Madeleine King	Labor	Albanese	Minister for Northern Australia	1 June 2022	Incumbent	4 years, 98 days

Notes

^{1} In 1972, Whitlam appointed both a Minister for the Northern Territory, Kep Enderby, and a Minister for Northern Development, Rex Patterson. From October 1973, Patterson held both titles, with the former title changing to Minister for Northern Australia. In October 1975, Patterson stood aside as Minister for Northern Australia, but remained as Minister for Northern Development until November 1975.

== List of assistant ministers for Northern Australia ==
Order	Minister	Party	Prime Minister	Title	Term start	Term end	Term in office	Reference
1	Nita Green	Labor	Albanese	Assistant Minister for Northern Australia	13 May 2025	Incumbent	1 year, 117 days	
