= Michael McCormack (Australian politician) =

Australian politician (born 1964)

The Honourable Michael McCormack MP
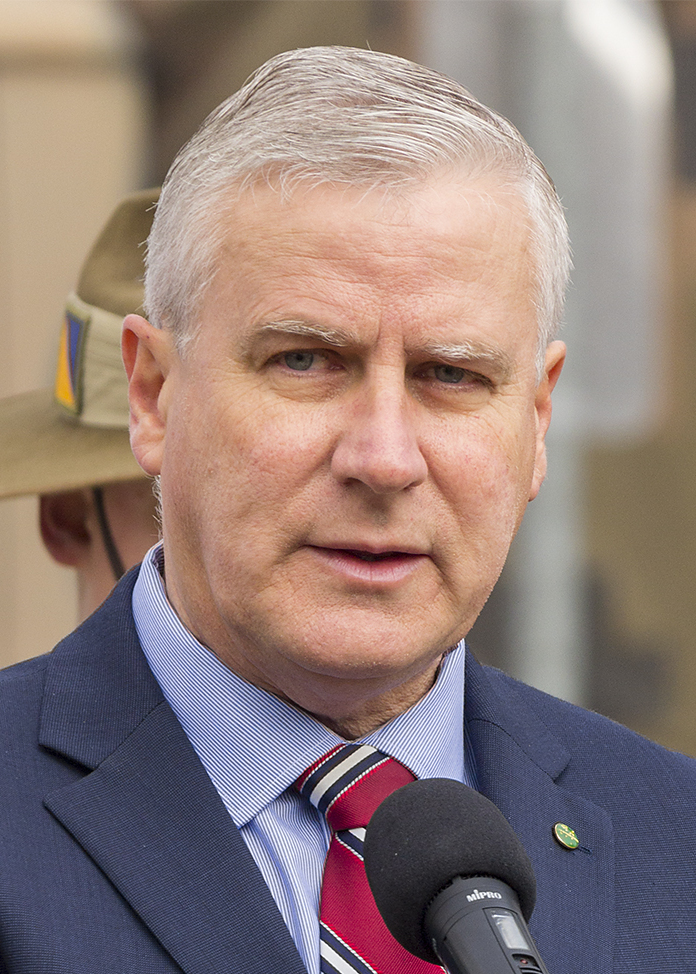

Deputy Prime Minister of Australia
- In office 26 February 2018 – 22 June 2021
- Prime Minister: Malcolm Turnbull; Scott Morrison
- Preceded by: Barnaby Joyce
- Succeeded by: Barnaby Joyce

Leader of the National Party
- In office 26 February 2018 – 21 June 2021
- Deputy: Bridget McKenzie; David Littleproud
- Preceded by: Barnaby Joyce
- Succeeded by: Barnaby Joyce

Shadow Minister for Water
- Incumbent
- Assumed office 16 March 2026
- Leader: Angus Taylor
- Preceded by: Ross Cadell

Shadow Minister for Veterans Affairs
- Incumbent
- Assumed office 16 March 2026
- Leader: Angus Taylor
- Preceded by: Darren Chester

Shadow Minister for International Development and the Pacific
- In office 5 June 2022 – 28 May 2025
- Leader: Peter Dutton; Sussan Ley
- Preceded by: Pat Conroy
- Succeeded by: James Wood (as Shadow Minister for International Development and Pacific Island Affairs)
Ministerial offices
Minister for Infrastructure, Transport and Regional Development Infrastructure & Transport (February 2018 – August 2018)
In office 26 February 2018 – 22 June 2021
Prime Minister	Malcolm Turnbull; Scott Morrison
Preceded by	Barnaby Joyce
Succeeded by	Barnaby Joyce
Deputy Leader of the House
In office 20 December 2017 – 5 March 2018
Prime Minister	Malcolm Turnbull
Leader	Christopher Pyne
Preceded by	Darren Chester
Succeeded by	Darren Chester
Minister for Veterans' Affairs Minister for Defence Personnel Minister Assisting the Prime Minister for the Centenary of ANZAC
In office 20 December 2017 – 5 March 2018
Prime Minister	Malcolm Turnbull
Preceded by	Dan Tehan
Succeeded by	Darren Chester
Minister for Small Business
In office 19 July 2016 – 20 December 2017
Prime Minister	Malcolm Turnbull
Preceded by	Kelly O'Dwyer
Succeeded by	Craig Laundy (as Minister for Small and Family Business, the Workplace and Deregulation)
Assistant Minister for Defence
In office 18 February 2016 – 19 July 2016
Prime Minister	Malcolm Turnbull
Preceded by	Darren Chester
Succeeded by	David Fawcett (2018)
Assistant Minister to the Deputy Prime Minister
In office 21 September 2015 – 18 February 2016
Prime Minister	Malcolm Turnbull
Deputy Prime Minister	Warren Truss
Preceded by	Position established
Succeeded by	Keith Pitt
Parliamentary-Secretary to the Minister for Finance
In office 18 September 2013 – 21 September 2015
Prime Minister	Tony Abbott
Minister	Mathias Cormann
Preceded by	Position established
Succeeded by	Peter Hendy (as Assistant Minister for Productivity)

Member of the Australian Parliament for Riverina
- Incumbent
- Assumed office 21 August 2010
- Preceded by: Kay Hull

Personal details
- Born: Michael Francis McCormack; 2 August 1964 (age 62) Wagga Wagga, New South Wales, Australia
- Party: National
- Spouse: Catherine McCormack (m. 1986)
- Children: 3
- Website: michaelmccormack.com.au

Michael Francis McCormack (born 2 August 1964) is an Australian politician who served as the deputy prime minister of Australia and the leader of the National Party from 2018 to 2021. He has been a member of parliament (MP) for the New South Wales division of Riverina since 2010. McCormack previously held various ministerial positions in the Turnbull and Morrison governments.

== Early life ==
McCormack was born in Wagga Wagga, New South Wales as one of five children born to Eileen Margaret (née Margosis; 1938–2018) and Lance McCormack (d. 2008), a dryland farmer. His maternal grandfather, George Peter Margosis, was born in 1896 in Akrata, Greece; his other three grandparents were born in New South Wales. He had four siblings, Denise, Robyn, Julieanne and Mark. He grew up on the family farms in nearby Marrar and Brucedale. He attended St Michael's Regional High School and Trinity Senior High School (later merged into Kildare Catholic College).

After leaving school, McCormack took up a cadetship at The Daily Advertiser, the local daily newspaper. He was appointed editor of the paper in 1991, aged 27, making him reputedly the "youngest newspaper editor in Australia". McCormack was sacked from The Daily Advertiser in February 2002. In response, "more than 20 journalists, photographers and other editorial staff" staged a 24-hour walkout. He went on to sue the Riverina Media Group for unfair dismissal, and in 2003 settled out of court for an undisclosed amount. McCormack subsequently started his own media and publishing company, MSS Media Services and Solutions. He also served as a director of the Murrumbidgee Turf Club from 1994 to 2003, as well as its official historian.

== Political career ==
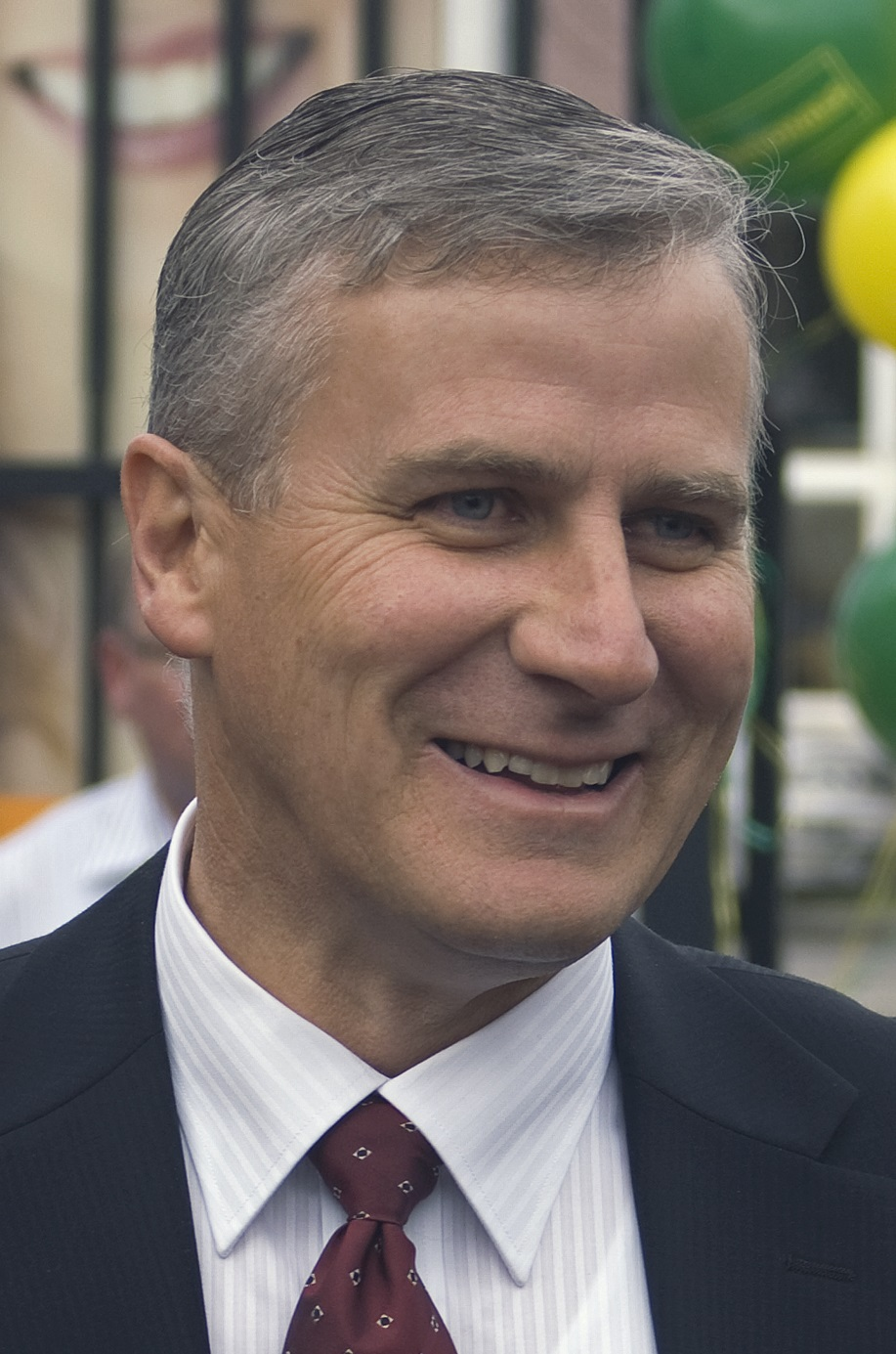
McCormack in July 2010

McCormack was campaign director for Kay Hull, the Nationals MP for Riverina, at the 2004 and 2007 federal elections. Hull announced her retirement from politics in April 2010, and McCormack subsequently won preselection for her seat at the 2010 election. The Liberals stood a candidate in Riverina for the first time since 1998, but that had little impact on the result, with the Nationals recording a 3.6-point positive swing on a two-party-preferred basis.

=== Ministerial posts ===
After the Coalition won the 2013 election, McCormack was made parliamentary secretary to the Minister for Finance, Mathias Cormann. He was later appointed Assistant Minister to the Deputy Prime Minister, Warren Truss, in September 2015. In February 2016, he became Assistant Minister for Defence under Marise Payne.

In July 2016, after the 2016 election, McCormack was appointed Minister for Small Business. In that capacity, he was responsible for the Australian Bureau of Statistics (ABS), which conducted the 2016 national census and the Australian Marriage Law Postal Survey during his tenure. He opposes same-sex marriage, but voted in favour of the Marriage Amendment (Definition and Religious Freedoms) Act 2017 after promising to vote in line with the survey result in his constituency. In a ministerial reshuffle in December 2017, McCormack was made Minister for Defence Personnel, Minister for Veterans' Affairs, and Minister Assisting the Prime Minister for the Centenary of ANZAC, positions which had previously been held by Dan Tehan. In February 2018, McCormack introduced a bill which implemented several new initiatives delivering better services to veterans and their families.

When Warren Truss retired as leader of the National Party in February 2016, McCormack publicly contemplated standing as his replacement. He eventually chose not to run for the leadership, allowing Barnaby Joyce to win the position unopposed. He did stand for the deputy leadership (which Joyce had vacated), but lost to Senator Fiona Nash reportedly by only a single vote. In December 2017, McCormack again contested the deputy leadership of the National Party, which had been made vacant as a result of Fiona Nash's disqualification from parliament. He was defeated by Bridget McKenzie, once again losing by only one vote.

=== Deputy Prime Minister (2018–2021) ===
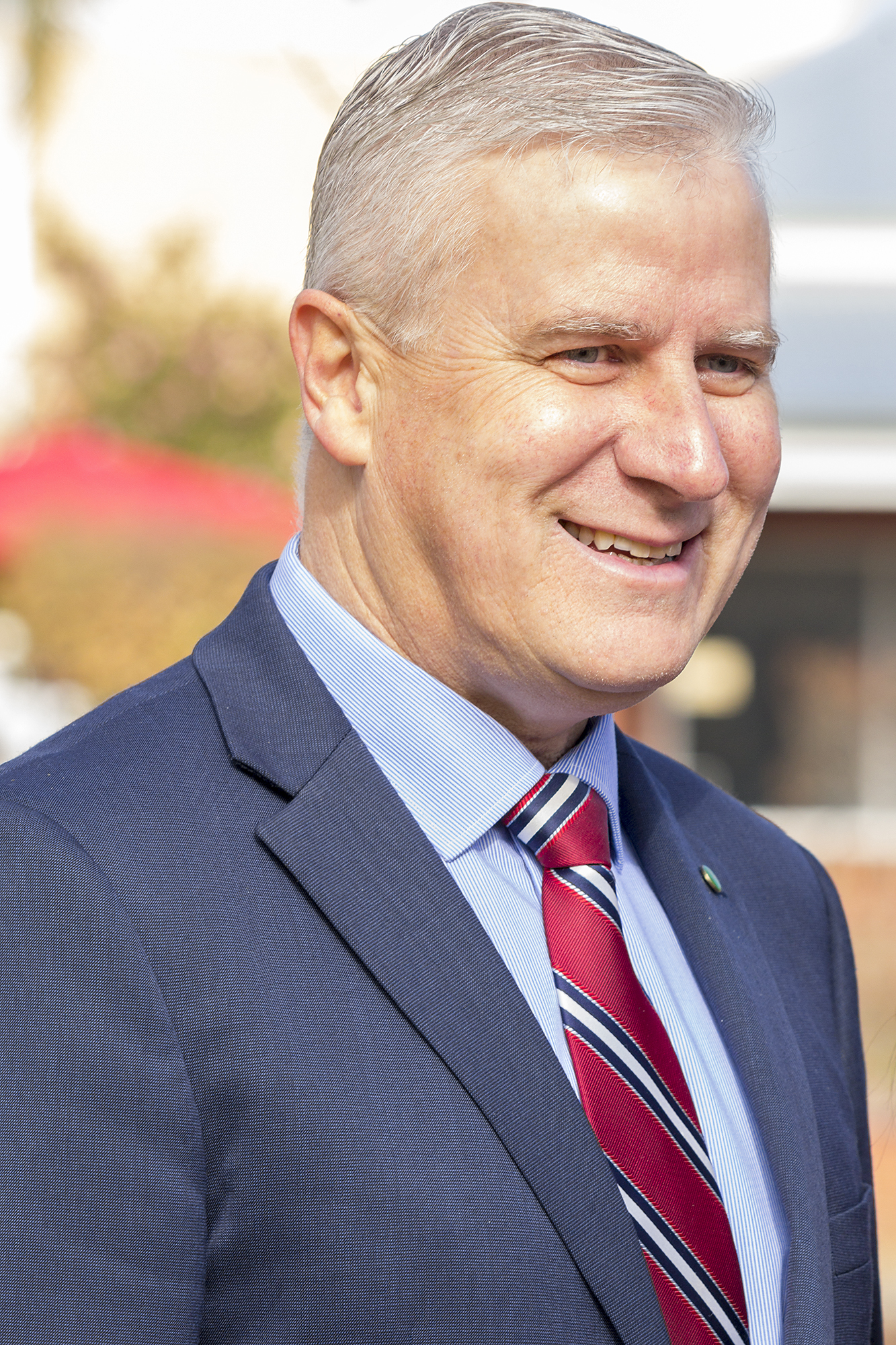
McCormack in July 2018

Following the resignation of Barnaby Joyce in February 2018, McCormack announced that he would contest the resulting leadership vote. Several other MPs publicly endorsed him for the position, and the only other announced candidate, David Gillespie, withdrew his candidacy the day before the election. George Christensen launched a last-minute bid for the leadership, but was defeated by McCormack, who succeeded Joyce as Deputy Prime Minister of Australia. He also replaced Joyce as Minister for Infrastructure and Transport.

After the Coalition won the 2019 federal election, McCormack was re-elected party leader unopposed. On 4 February 2020, Joyce unsuccessfully challenged McCormack as leader of the Nationals. A second leadership leadership spill was held on 21 June 2021, and was called by the Senator for Queensland, Matt Canavan. McCormack had been criticised for his performance during Question Time while serving as Acting Prime Minister, as well as not "extracting enough from the Prime Minister" in relation to a net zero emissions target. McCormack was defeated by his predecessor Barnaby Joyce, who assumed the former's position as leader and Deputy Prime Minister. He then returned to the backbench.

=== Shadow minister ===
McCormack was re-elected at the 2022 election with a reduced vote-share of 64.85% on a two-party preferred basis. In June 2022, he was appointed by Opposition Leader Peter Dutton as Shadow Minister for International Development and the Pacific.

== Personal life ==
McCormack, a Roman Catholic, married Catherine (née Shaw) in Saint Michael's Cathedral, Wagga Wagga in 1986. They have three children.

In 1995, he became the owner of "the biggest collection of bound volumes of The Times anywhere in the world outside London", acquiring 900 volumes from Charles Sturt University when it ran out of storage space.

In 2022, McCormack was taken to the hospital after drinking a bowl of Micronesian sakau, a concentrated version of kava. He had reportedly underestimated its potency.

== Controversy ==
=== Anti-gay stance ===
In 1993, McCormack published a controversial editorial in which he blamed homosexuality for AIDS and criticized pride parades. He wrote that "a week never goes by anymore that homosexuals and their sordid behaviour don't become further entrenched in society [...] unfortunately gays are here and, if the disease their unnatural acts helped spread doesn't wipe out humanity, they're here to stay". He asked "how can these people call for rights when they're responsible for the greatest medical dilemma known to man – Acquired Immune Deficiency Syndrome?"

The article was the subject of three complaints to the Australian Press Council, though none was upheld. In further editorials from the same period he said "I'm not sorry, why should I be?" about his views, and branded himself "homophobic". McCormack subsequently wrote a second editorial apologising for the first. His remarks resurfaced when he embarked on a career in politics, and he issued further apologies in 2010 and 2017, stating that he had "grown and learnt not only to tolerate, but to accept all people regardless of their sexual orientation or any other trait or feature which makes each of us different and unique". Despite his apologies, the controversy resurfaced after he became Deputy Prime Minister (2018–2021).

=== Advocacy for corporal punishment and the death penalty ===
In other editorials, he called for the return of caning in high schools, saying "there is nothing wrong, in my opinion, with students [...] being given a 'stinging reminder' about how to conduct themselves". He also voiced support for the death penalty.

When asked for comment by The Guardian, he said that "editorial views expressed more than 25 years ago in no way reflect how my views and community views have changed since publication [...] as people get older and start families, and grow as members of their community it is completely reasonable their views change over time".

=== Pacific Islands comments ===
In August 2019, McCormack was Acting Prime Minister while the Prime Minister, Scott Morrison, was at a Pacific Islands Forum. Morrison was being criticized by Pacific Islands leaders for Australia's contribution to global warming and rising sea levels, which threatened their low-lying territories. McCormack assured an Australian audience: "They'll continue to survive because many of their workers come here and pick our fruit".

=== Pork-barrelling ===
In January 2020, McCormack's deputy leader Bridget McKenzie resigned her ministerial post after she admitted to having breached the ministerial code of conduct and widespread accusations of pork barrelling.

It was subsequently revealed that regional infrastructure grants program administered by McCormack in the months leading up to the 2019 federal election awarded 94 per cent of its grants to electorates held or targeted by the Coalition.

=== Coronavirus ===
In September 2020, McCormack was forced to backtrack an opinion attributing Victoria's second COVID-19 outbreak to a Black Lives Matter protest in Melbourne as a panellist on the Q+A program. When he was told there was lack of evidence regarding this by host Hamish Macdonald, McCormack stated that he'll "accept that but people shouldn't be protesting". The Department of Health and Human Services in Victoria had confirmed that no positive cases of COVID-19 came from the protest in June 2020, despite the fact that allowing the protest went against emergency health regulations in the state.

=== United States Capitol storming comments ===
In January 2021, McCormack was criticised for comparing the 2021 storming of the United States Capitol by supporters of Donald Trump to Black Lives Matter protesters saying, "Any form of protest, whether it's a protest over racial riots or indeed what we’ve seen on Capitol Hill in recent days, is condemned and is abhorred.” McCormack's statement was criticised by Amnesty International and the Opposition. A spokesperson for McCormack later said, "Any form of violence should be condemned."

Parliament of Australia
Preceded by Kay Hull	Member for Riverina; 2010–present	Incumbent
Political offices
Preceded by Barnaby Joyce	Deputy Prime Minister of Australia; 2018–2021	Succeeded by Barnaby Joyce
Preceded by Himself as Infrastructure and Transport	Minister for Infrastructure, Transport and Regional Development; 2018–2021	Succeeded by Barnaby Joyce
Preceded by Barnaby Joyce	Minister for Infrastructure and Transport; 2018	Succeeded by Himself as Minister for Infrastructure, Transport and Regional Development
Preceded by Dan Tehan	Minister for Veterans' Affairs; 2017–2018	Succeeded by Darren Chester
Preceded by Dan Tehan	Minister for Defence Personnel; 2017–2018	Succeeded by Darren Chester
Preceded by Dan Tehan	Minister Assisting the Prime Minister for the Centenary of ANZAC; 2017–2018	Succeeded by Darren Chester
Preceded by Kelly O'Dwyer	Minister for Small Business; 2016–2017	Succeeded by Craig Laundy as Minister for Small and Family Business, the Workplace and Deregulation
Preceded by Darren Chester	Assistant Minister for Defence; 2016	Post abolished
Party political offices
Preceded by Barnaby Joyce	Leader of the National Party; 2018–2021	Succeeded by Barnaby Joyce
