= Minister for Resources =

Australian cabinet position

- Commonwealth Coat of Arms

- Flag of Australia

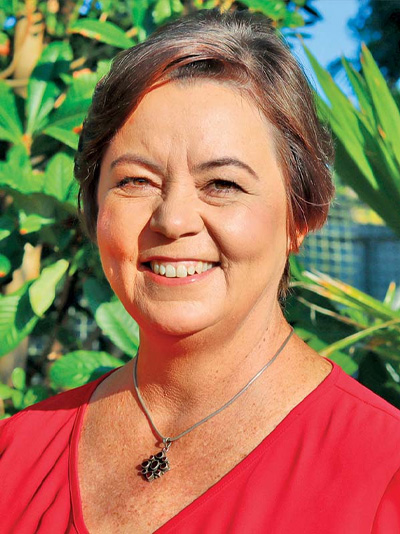
- Incumbent; Madeleine King since 1 June 2022
- Department of Industry, Science and Resources
- Style: The Honourable
- Appointer: Governor-General on the recommendation of the Prime Minister of Australia
- Inaugural holder: Rex Connor (as Minister for Minerals and Energy)
- Formation: 19 December 1972
- Website: www.minister.industry.gov.au/ministers/king

The Minister for Resources is an Australian Government cabinet position which is currently held by Madeleine King following the swearing in of the full Albanese ministry on 1 June 2022.

In the Government of Australia, the ministers administer this portfolio through the Department of Industry, Science and Resources.

== Mission and outcomes ==
Information about the department's functions and/or government funding allocation could be found in the Administrative Arrangements Orders, the annual Portfolio Budget Statements, in the department's annual reports and on the department's website.

At its creation, the department was responsible for:

- Environment protection and conservation of biodiversity
- Air quality
- National fuel quality standards
- Land contamination
- Meteorology
- Administration of the Australian Antarctic Territory and the Territory of Heard Island and McDonald Islands
- Natural, built and movable cultural heritage
- Greenhouse policy coordination
- Environmental research
- Water policy and resources

In the Howard government, the portfolio of Water Resources was assigned to the Environment Department; this was an Australian Public Service department, staffed by officials who were responsible to the Minister for the Environment and Water Resources, Malcolm Turnbull. The secretary of the department was David Borthwick.

== List of ministers for resources ==
Australia has had ministers who had specific responsibility for matters relating to the development of minerals resources since December 1972, although earlier there were ministers for national development, who had some responsibilities in this area as well.

Order	Minister	Party	Prime Minister	Title	Term start	Term end	Term in office
1	Rex Connor	Labor	Whitlam	Minister for Minerals and Energy	19 December 1972	14 October 1975	2 years, 299 days
2	Ken Wriedt	Labor	Whitlam	Minister for Minerals and Energy	14 October 1975	11 November 1975	28 days
3	Doug Anthony	National Country	Fraser	Minister for National Resources	11 November 1975	20 December 1977	7 years, 120 days
3	Doug Anthony	National Country	Fraser	Minister for Trade and Resources	20 December 1977	16 October 1982	7 years, 120 days
3	Doug Anthony	National	Fraser	Minister for Trade and Resources	16 October 1982	11 March 1983	7 years, 120 days
4	Peter Walsh	Labor	Hawke	Minister for Resources and Energy	11 March 1983	13 December 1984	1 year, 277 days
5	Gareth Evans	Labor	Hawke	Minister for Resources and Energy	13 December 1984	24 July 1987	2 years, 223 days
6	Peter Morris	Labor	Hawke	Minister for Resources	24 July 1987	19 January 1988	179 days
7	Peter Cook	Labor	Hawke	Minister for Resources	19 January 1988	4 April 1990	2 years, 75 days
8	Alan Griffiths	Labor	Hawke	Minister for Resources	4 April 1990	20 December 1991	2 years, 354 days
8	Alan Griffiths	Labor	Keating	Minister for Resources	20 December 1991	24 March 1993	2 years, 354 days
9	Michael Lee	Labor	Keating	Minister for Resources	24 March 1993	24 December 1993	275 days
10	David Beddall	Labor	Keating	Minister for Resources	24 December 1993	11 March 1996	2 years, 78 days
11	Warwick Parer	Liberal	Howard	Minister for Resources and Energy	11 March 1996	21 October 1998	2 years, 224 days
12	Nick Minchin	Liberal	Howard	Minister for Industry, Science and Resources	21 October 1998	26 November 2001	3 years, 36 days
13	Ian Macfarlane	Liberal	Howard	Minister for Industry, Tourism and Resources	26 November 2001	3 December 2007	6 years, 7 days
14	Martin Ferguson	Labor	Rudd	Minister for Resources and Energy	3 December 2007	24 June 2010	5 years, 89 days
14	Martin Ferguson	Labor	Gillard	Minister for Resources and Energy	24 June 2010	22 March 2013	5 years, 89 days
15	Gary Gray	Labor	Gillard	Minister for Resources and Energy	22 March 2013	27 June 2013	180 days
15	Gary Gray	Labor	Rudd	Minister for Resources and Energy	27 June 2013	18 September 2013	180 days
16	Josh Frydenberg	Liberal	Turnbull	Minister for Resources, Energy and Northern Australia	21 September 2015	18 February 2016	302 days
16	Josh Frydenberg	Liberal	Turnbull	Minister for Resources and Energy	18 February 2016	19 July 2016	302 days
17	Matt Canavan	National	Turnbull	Minister for Resources and Northern Australia	19 July 2016	25 July 2017	1 year, 6 days
18	Barnaby Joyce	National	Turnbull	Minister for Resources and Northern Australia	25 July 2017	27 October 2017	94 days
(17)	Matt Canavan	National	Turnbull	Minister for Resources and Northern Australia	27 October 2017	24 August 2018	2 years, 99 days
(17)	Matt Canavan	National	Morrison	Minister for Resources and Northern Australia	24 August 2018	3 February 2020	2 years, 99 days
19	Keith Pitt^{1}	National	Morrison	Minister for Resources, Water and Northern Australia	6 February 2020	2 July 2021	2 years, 106 days
19	Keith Pitt^{1}	National	Morrison	Minister for Resources and Water	2 July 2021	23 May 2022	2 years, 106 days
19	Scott Morrison^{1}	Liberal	Morrison	Minister for Industry, Science, Energy and Resources	15 April 2021	23 May 2022	1 year, 38 days
20	Madeleine King	Labor	Albanese	Minister for Resources	1 June 2022	Incumbent	4 years, 98 days

^{1} Morrison was appointed as Minister for Industry, Science, Energy and Resources by the Governor-General on Morrison's advice in April 2021, with both Morrison and Pitt holding the position of Minister for Resources until May 2022. However, the appointment of Morrison was not made public until August 2022.

== List of assistant ministers ==
Order	Minister	Party	Prime Minister	Title	Term start	Term end	Term in office	Reference
1	Anthony Chisholm	Labor	Anthony Albanese	Assistant Minister for Resources	13 May 2025	Incumbent	1 year, 117 days	
