= Bridget McKenzie =

Australian politician (born 1969)

Senator The Honourable Bridget McKenzie
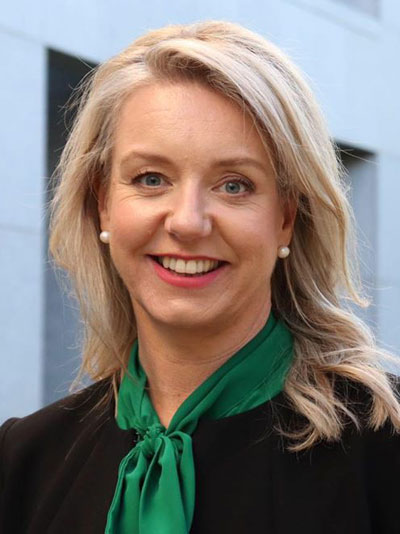
- McKenzie in 2019

Leader of the Nationals in the Senate
- Incumbent
- Assumed office 2 July 2019
- Deputy: Matt Canavan (2019–2022); Perin Davey (2022–2025); Susan McDonald (2025–present)
- Leader: Michael McCormack (2019–2021); Barnaby Joyce (2021–22); David Littleproud (2022–26); Matt Canavan (2026–present)
- Preceded by: Nigel Scullion

Shadow Minister for Infrastructure and Transport Shadow Minister for Regional Development, Local Government and Territories
- Incumbent
- Assumed office 16 March 2026
- Leader: Angus Taylor
- Preceded by: Herself (as Shadow Minister for Infrastructure, Transport and Regional Development); Anne Webster (as Shadow Minister for Regional Development, Local Government and Territories)

Shadow Minister for Infrastructure, Transport and Regional Development
- In office 17 February 2026 – 16 March 2026
- Leader: Angus Taylor
- Preceded by: James McGrath (acting)
- Succeeded by: Herself (as Shadow Minister for Infrastructure and Transport and Shadow Minister for Regional Development, Local Government and Territories
- In office 5 June 2022 – 21 January 2026
- Leader: Peter Dutton; Sussan Ley
- Preceded by: Catherine King
- Succeeded by: James McGrath (acting)

Deputy Leader of the National Party
- In office 7 December 2017 – 2 February 2020
- Leader: Barnaby Joyce; Michael McCormack
- Preceded by: Fiona Nash
- Succeeded by: David Littleproud
Ministerial offices
Minister for Emergency Management and National Recovery and Resilience
In office 2 July 2021 – 23 May 2022
Prime Minister	Scott Morrison
Preceded by	David Littleproud
Succeeded by	Murray Watt
Minister for Regionalisation, Regional Communications and Regional Education
In office 2 July 2021 – 23 May 2022
Prime Minister	Scott Morrison
Preceded by	Mark Coulton
Succeeded by	Abolished
Minister for Agriculture
In office 29 May 2019 – 2 February 2020
Prime Minister	Scott Morrison
Preceded by	David Littleproud
Succeeded by	David Littleproud
Minister for Regional Services, Decentralisation and Local Government
In office 28 August 2018 – 29 May 2019
Prime Minister	Scott Morrison
Minister	Michael McCormack
Preceded by	John McVeigh
Succeeded by	Mark Coulton
Minister for Sport
In office 20 December 2017 – 29 May 2019
Prime Minister	Malcolm Turnbull; Scott Morrison
Preceded by	Greg Hunt
Succeeded by	Richard Colbeck
Minister for Rural Health Minister for Regional Communications
In office 20 December 2017 – 28 August 2018
Prime Minister	Malcolm Turnbull; Scott Morrison
Preceded by	Fiona Nash
Succeeded by	(abolished)

Senator for Victoria
- Incumbent
- Assumed office 1 July 2011
- Preceded by: Julian McGauran

Personal details
- Born: Bridget Grace McKenzie; 27 December 1969 (age 56) Alexandra, Victoria, Australia
- Party: National
- Education: Deakin University

Bridget Grace McKenzie (born 27 December 1969) is an Australian politician. She is a member of the National Party and has been a Senator for Victoria since 2011. She has held ministerial office in the Turnbull and Morrison governments, also serving as the party's Senate leader since 2019.

McKenzie grew up in Benalla, Victoria, and worked as a schoolteacher and university lecturer before entering politics. She was elected to the Senate at the 2010 federal election and served as a whip from 2011 to 2013. McKenzie replaced Fiona Nash as deputy leader of the Nationals during the 2017 parliamentary eligibility crisis, and as a result was elevated to cabinet. She served variously as Minister for Rural Health (2017–2018), Sport (2017–2018), Regional Communications (2017–2018), Regional Services, Local Government and Decentralisation (2018–2019), and Agriculture (2019–2020). McKenzie resigned from cabinet and as deputy leader in 2020 as a result of a scandal surrounding the administration of community sporting grants. She was reappointed to cabinet in 2021 following a Nationals leadership spill as Minister for Emergency Management and National Recovery and Resilience and Minister for Regionalisation, Regional Communications and Regional Education.

== Early life ==
McKenzie was born on 27 December 1969 in Alexandra, Victoria. She spent her early childhood in Benalla, where her mother was a primary school teacher and her father was a dairyman. She attended Benalla East Primary School and Benalla High School, before moving to Tintern Grammar in Melbourne to complete her secondary education. At Tintern Grammar she was a house captain and swimming captain.

After starting a family, McKenzie began studying at Deakin University as a mature-age student, completing a double degree in applied science (specialising in human movement) and teaching (specialising in mathematics). She served as the president of the Deakin University Student Association in 2003. McKenzie subsequently taught physical education and mathematics for several years at Yarram Secondary College, Gippsland. She later lectured in education at Monash University.

== Politics ==
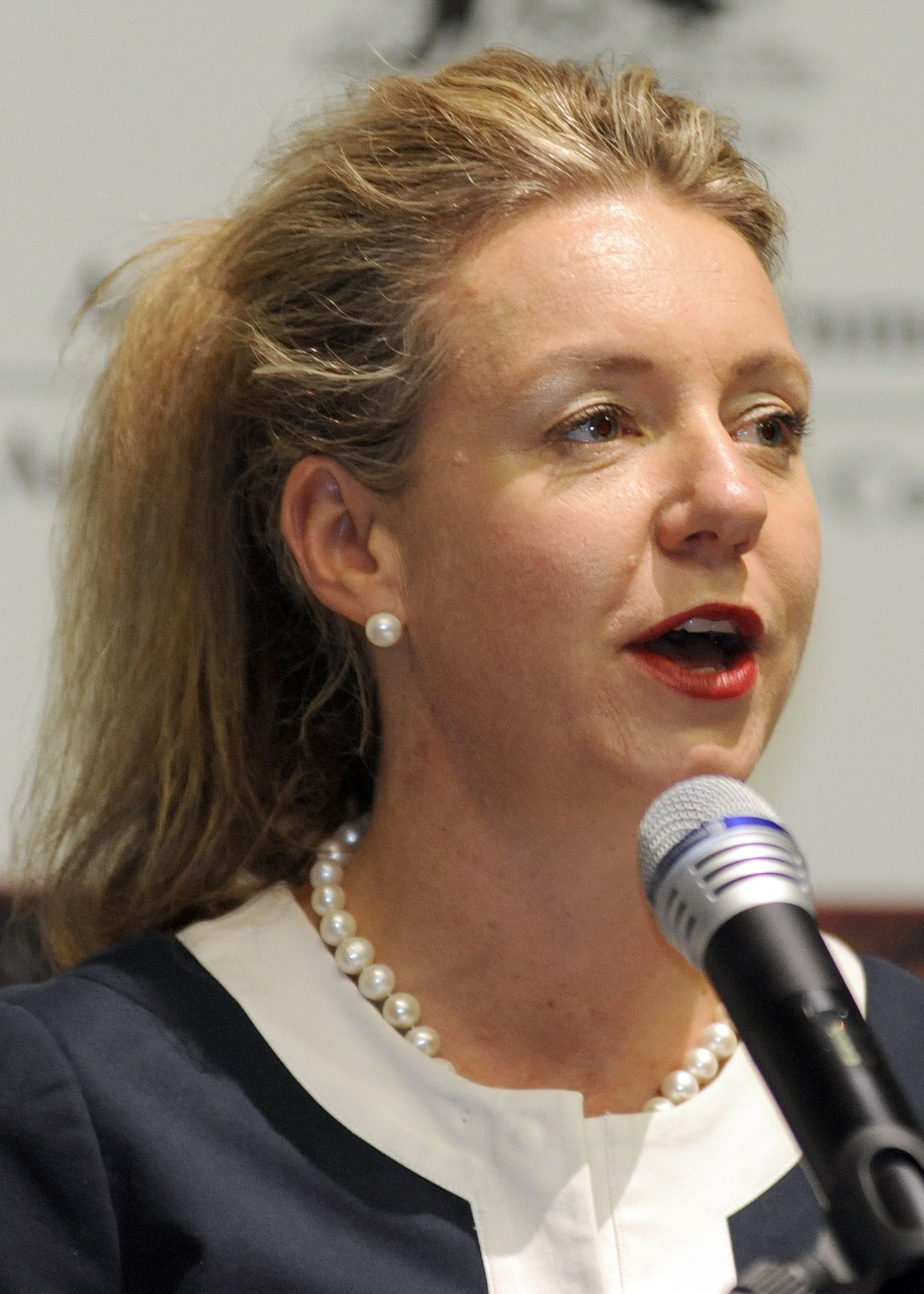
McKenzie in November 2014

McKenzie joined the National Party at the age of 18, and was a junior vice-president of the Victorian branch from 2006 to 2009. She first stood for parliament at the 2004 federal election, unsuccessfully standing for the House of Representatives in the Division of McMillan. At the 2010 election, McKenzie was elected to the Senate in the third place on a joint Coalition ticket. Her term began on 1 July 2011.

McKenzie was her party's Senate whip from September 2013 to June 2014. She was elected deputy leader to Barnaby Joyce in December 2017, replacing Fiona Nash after her disqualification from parliament due to dual citizenship. Under the terms of the Coalition Agreement with the Liberals, McKenzie was elevated to cabinet as Minister for Sport, Minister for Rural Health, and Minister for Regional Communications.

When Scott Morrison became prime minister in August 2018, McKenzie was appointed Minister for Regional Services, Decentralisation and Local Government. She also retained the sport portfolio. After the Coalition retained office at the 2019 election, she was appointed Minister for Agriculture. McKenzie is the first woman to hold the position.

McKenzie is a shooting enthusiast, and is chair of the Parliamentary Friends of Shooting. She is opposed to same-sex marriage, and publicly campaigned for the "No" vote in the Australian Marriage Law Postal Survey. McKenzie's gay younger brother confronted her on her views in a letter to the Bendigo Advertiser and on the panel discussion program Q&A.

In May 2024, McKenzie called Fatima Payman's comments "Absolutely appalling" during which Payman accusing Israel of genocide during Gaza war and using phrase "From the river to the sea Palestine will be free, and asked "What's the Prime Minister going to do with this Senator who has completely been subordinate to him?”

=== Minister for Agriculture ===
As Agriculture Minister, McKenzie announced measures to protect Australia's pork industry from African Swine Fever. On 11 December 2019 McKenzie announced $66.6 million to boost Australia's defences against the virus which has a high mortality rates in domestic pigs. Australia's ASF Response Package saw 130 more frontline biosecurity officers deployed from January 2020 to do half a million more passenger screenings a year; six new detector dogs deployed at airports and mail centres and two new 3D x-ray machines at Melbourne and Sydney mail centres. Biosecurity officers were given a new capability to issue infringement notices on the spot at airports.

On 12 September 2019, the Australian Senate passed the Criminal Code Amendment (Agricultural Protection) Bill 2019 which introduced new offences for the incitement of trespass, property damage, or theft on agricultural land. McKenzie said the Bill sent a clear message that animal activists who use the personal information of farmers to incite trespass risked jail. “Australians expect the farmers who feed and clothe us – and many millions around the world – should not be harassed, or worse, as they go about their work. The time has come for activists to understand that you can't just descend on someone's place of work and home, interfere with their business and steal their animals—and think that you can get away with it. When protests become acts of trespass and theft, you're not a protestor, you're a criminal and deserve to be punished." Australia's peak agricultural body the National Farmers Federation welcomed the new laws and said the Bill sent a clear signal to anti-farming activists that the invasion of farms and harassment of farmers, their families and workers, running lawful businesses, would not be tolerated.

In December 2019, McKenzie announced Australia's first national Mandatory Dairy Industry Code of Conduct. A Mandatory Dairy Code was a key recommendation of the Australian Competition & Consumer Commission's 2018 Dairy Inquiry and its introduction was welcomed by the ACCC and greeted with almost universal approval from farmer bodies. Among provisions the code unveiled by Minister McKenzie included were that: all parties must deal with each other fairly and in good faith; bans retrospective step-downs; stops processors from making unilateral changes to agreements; bans processors from withholding loyalty payments to farmers if a farmer switches processors; and Introduces a dispute resolution process for matters arising under or in connection with agreements.

=== Regional Deal ===
During an address to the Australian National Press Club on 20 March 2019 broadcast from her home town of Wodonga when the Minister for Regional Services, Sport, Local Government and Decentralisation, McKenzie announced a pilot Regional Deal for Albury-Wodonga.

It was the first cross-border deal, involving state and local governments from NSW and Victoria, ever made and aimed to harmonise some of the regulatory barriers faced by these two cities to drive more growth and productivity locally.

The federal, NSW and Victorian governments, and Albury and Wodonga councils agreed to sign the statement of intent on 6 July 2020.

Hers was the first time the nationally broadcast address was hosted outside a capital city, and McKenzie used the occasion to focus on the opportunity regional Australia offered for national economic growth, saying regional Australia was a place of opportunity with unlimited potential.

=== Return to Cabinet ===
Following a Nationals leadership spill in July 2021, in which Barnaby Joyce replaced Michael McCormack as party leader and Deputy Prime Minister, McKenzie was returned to Cabinet, and appointed as Minister for Emergency Management and National Recovery and Resilience and Minister for Regionalisation, Regional Communications and Regional Education. She remained in these ministerial positions until the Coalition lost the 2022 federal election in May 2022.

=== In Opposition ===
McKenzie was appointed Shadow Minister for Infrastructure, Transport and Regional Development in the Peter Dutton-led Coalition Opposition. In addition, McKenzie serves on the Appropriations, Staffing and Security Senate Standing Committee, and the Procedure Senate Standing Committee. In an interview with ABC reporter Annabel Crabb, McKenzie specifically identified Prime Minister Morrison's treatment of Australia Post CEO Christine Holgate as a pivotal moment in the former Coalition Government's election loss. In McKenzie's view, the pressure Morrison applied to Holgate to induce her to step down in the wake of critical media reports fatally damaged the perception of the Coalition amongst professional and, even, conservative women. McKenzie has been actively working to repair this relationship as part of a strategy to return the Coalition to power at the next federal election.

Following the Coalition's defeat at the 2025 election, McKenzie retained her role as the National Party's Senate leader. She publicly criticised Senator Jacinta Price for her defection from the Nationals to the Liberal Party after the election. McKenzie supported National Party leader David Littleproud's decision to withdraw the party from the Coalition in May 2025, following an initial failure to reach an agreement over terms of the alliance. She had reportedly earlier written to Michaelia Cash, the Liberal Party's Senate leader, threatening to suspend co-operation in the Senate in response to Price's defection.

In January 2026, following a recall of parliament to vote on the Combatting Antisemitism, Hate and Extremism (Criminal and Migration Laws) Bill 2026, McKenzie resigned from the Ley shadow ministry after crossing the floor to vote against the official Liberal–National Coalition position on the hate speech law.

==== Qantas Inquiry ====
McKenzie became Chair of the Select Committee on Commonwealth Bilateral Air Service Agreements (popularly referred to as the Qantas Inquiry) on 5 September 2023. The Senate established this inquiry in the wake of Labor Transport Minister Catherine King's decision to decline Qatar Airways’ request for additional capacity into Australia. This decision prompted significant consternation in sections of the Australian electorate due to elevated airfare prices, particularly on the high demand Europe route, in the wake of the COVID-19 pandemic. Experts specifically attributed the increase in airfares to “an imbalance between demand and supply,” which could have been partially meliorated by the increase in capacity proposed by Qatar Airways.

== Sports Rorts and other controversies ==
=== Sports rorts affair ===
In January 2020, McKenzie was widely accused of pork-barrelling after the release of a report by the Commonwealth auditor-general which found that a $100 million sports grant program she oversaw in the lead-up to the 2019 Australian federal election was administered in a way that "was not informed by an appropriate assessment process and sound advice". The auditor-general's report noted that it was not clear what the legal authority for the particular allocation of grants was.

A disproportionately high percentage of funds were allocated to sporting clubs in marginal Coalition electorates. One Adelaide rugby union club was awarded a $500,000 grant under the scheme for new female change rooms, despite not fielding a women's team since 2018 when it was embroiled in a sexism controversy. The club, located in the marginal Coalition-held seat of Sturt, was awarded the scheme's maximum available grant just weeks before the election. A football club in the marginally held Coalition seat of Brisbane was given $150,000 for a project that had already been funded. More than $1 million in grants were allocated to sports clubs with links to clubs Coalition MPs as members or patrons: three linked to Indigenous affairs minister Ken Wyatt, one tied to treasurer and deputy Liberal leader Josh Frydenberg, and two associated with senator Sarah Henderson. Nationals leader Michael McCormack's son's football club in the NSW Riverina also received a $147,000 grant under the program. In some cases, the funds were presented as oversized novelty cheques by the Liberal candidate for the seat in question, rather than by the sitting member.

In a submission to a Senate Select Committee on Administration of Sports Grants, McKenzie stood by her Ministerial discretion which "saw grants distributed more evenly by state, region, sport, organisation type and funding stream than if the recommendations of Sport Australia or the methodology seemingly favoured by the Auditor-General were adopted".

==== Calls for resignation ====
The Opposition called for McKenzie to resign from the federal ministry because of the bias in the funding allocated. She maintained that "no project that received funding was not eligible to receive it" and that "no rules were broken in this program". The Leader of the Opposition Anthony Albanese stated that what McKenzie had done "fails every test" and she must be sacked.

In 1993, Ros Kelly, the Labor Sports Minister in the Keating government resigned under almost identical circumstances in what came to be known as the Sports Rorts affair.

More than 70 per cent of Australian Financial Review readers who participated in an online poll said that McKenzie should resign over the scandal.

==== Government response ====
The government steadfastly supported McKenzie throughout the scandal. Prime Minister Scott Morrison, Michael McCormack, Peter Dutton and other high-profile Coalition ministers repeatedly spoke out in her defence.

Following the revelation that McKenzie awarded a $36,000 grant to a regional Victorian shooting club without declaring that she was a member, on 22 January 2020 Morrison referred the report of the Commonwealth Auditor-General to the Secretary of the Department of the Prime Minister and Cabinet for advice in relation to the conduct of ministerial standards. On 29 January, Morrison attempted to distance himself from the scandal after being asked questions at a National Press Club meeting. Morrison was asked why his office had approved an extra $42.5 million for the sports grants scheme in March 2019, but did not explain.

The report by the Secretary of the Department of Prime Minister and Cabinet determined that McKenzie had breached the ministerial code of conduct and, on 2 February, she tendered her resignation as Minister for Agriculture and Deputy Leader of her party. She remained as leader of the Nationals in the Senate, along with Matt Canavan as deputy, as the other 3 Nationals senators were first-termers.

=== Other controversies ===
In 2017, McKenzie was accused of using parliamentary travel entitlements for personal benefit. The accusations centered on a weekend trip to the Gold Coast that McKenzie took in September 2014. Also questioned was a February 2017 trip to Sydney to speak at a Shooting Australia awards ceremony, which was claimed as "electorate business"; media reports suggested that it did not fall under the usual category of parliamentary business, and the city of Sydney is not located in the state of Victoria which Bridget represents.

McKenzie's electorate office was in the regional city of Bendigo, and she was described in media headlines as "Bendigo-based" on a number of occasions. In 2018, after maintaining the office in Bendigo as "a National Party campaign office" for some months following her ascension to Cabinet, McKenzie relocated her electorate office to Wodonga, some 250 km away in the federal electorate of Indi, which led to media rumours she would contest the seat, at the 2019 federal election. Although the move rankled Indi-based Liberal Party members, McKenzie had planned to relocate to North East Victoria for many years and was waiting for Department of Finance approval. McKenzie is the only Victorian Senator based outside Melbourne and the Electorate office relocation also incorporated the inclusion of a Ministerial office. The move cost taxpayers more than $500,000. In 2016 it was noted that her primary residence was a flat in the inner-Melbourne suburb of Elwood, and she stayed in hotels when she visited Bendigo.

In 2023, McKenzie billed taxpayers for flights and accommodation to Tasmania before and after her son's wedding in the Tamar Valley, at which she appeared in social media photos at. No public record of any parliamentary duties were found for this trip, except for an interview with a local newspaper where she talked about road maintenance.

== Personal life ==
McKenzie has four children from her marriage to Tim Edwards, a police officer. The marriage ended in divorce. She was subsequently in a long-distance relationship with David Bennett, a member of the New Zealand Parliament. Both were members of their respective countries' National Parties. In January 2021, it was reported that McKenzie was in a relationship with Simon Benson, the national affairs editor for News Corp Australia.

In 2020, McKenzie published a biography of former Country Party leader John McEwen through Connor Court Publishing. It was launched by journalist Paul Kelly, who described it as "highly readable".

Political offices
Preceded by Greg Hunt	Minister for Sport; 2017–2019	Succeeded by Richard Colbeck
Preceded by Fiona Nash	Minister for Rural Health; 2017–2018	Succeeded by Greg Hunt as Minister for Health
Preceded by Fiona Nash	Minister for Regional Communications; 2017–2018	Succeeded by Mitch Fifield as Minister for Communications and the Arts
Preceded by John McVeigh	Minister for Regional Services, Local Government and Decentralisation; 2018–2019	Succeeded by Mark Coulton
Preceded by David Littleproud as Minister for Agriculture and Water Resources	Minister for Agriculture; 2019–2020	Succeeded by Michael McCormack
Preceded by David Littleproud as Minister for Agriculture, Drought and Emergency Management	Minister for Emergency Management and National Recovery and Resilience; 2021–2022	Succeeded by Murray Watt as Minister for Emergency Management
Preceded by Andrew Gee as Minister for Decentralisation and Regional Education	Minister for Regionalisation, Regional Communications and Regional Education; 2021–2022	Succeeded by Kristy McBain as Minister for Regional Development, Local Government and Territories
Preceded by Andrew Gee as Minister for Decentralisation and Regional Education	Minister for Regionalisation, Regional Communications and Regional Education; 2021–2022	Succeeded by Jason Clare as Minister for Education
Preceded by Mark Coulton as Minister for Regional Health, Regional Communications and Local Government	Minister for Regionalisation, Regional Communications and Regional Education; 2021–2022	Succeeded by Michelle Rowland as Minister for Communications
Party political offices
Preceded by Fiona Nash	Deputy Leader of the National Party of Australia; 2017–2020	Succeeded by David Littleproud
Preceded by Nigel Scullion	Leader of the National Party of Australia in the Senate; 2017–present	Incumbent
