= Shorten shadow ministry =

Australian shadow ministry (2013–2019)

The Shadow Ministry of Bill Shorten
- Shadow cabinet of Australia

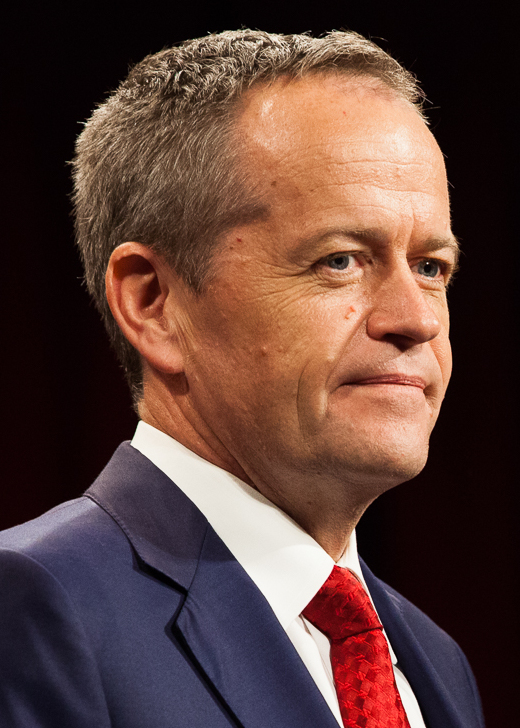
- Bill Shorten
- Date formed: 13 October 2013
- Date dissolved: 2 June 2019

People and organisations
- Opposition Leader: Bill Shorten
- Deputy Opposition Leader: Tanya Plibersek
- Member party: Labor
- Status in legislature: Labor opposition

History
- Legislature terms: 44th 45th
- Predecessor: Abbott Shadow Ministry
- Successor: Albanese Shadow Ministry

The Shadow Ministry of Bill Shorten was the opposition Australian Labor Party shadow ministry from October 2013 to May 2019, opposing the Abbott government, Turnbull government and Morrison government.

The Opposition Front Bench is a group of senior Opposition spokespeople who are regarded as the alternative Cabinet to the Cabinet of Australia, whose members shadow or mark each individual Minister or portfolio of the Government. Neither the Shadow Cabinet nor the Shadow Ministers have any official status in the Parliament of Australia. The Shadow Cabinet's membership is determined by the rules and practices of the Opposition party.

From 2013 Labor leadership ballot resulting from the 2013 Australian federal election, to 2019, the Shadow Cabinet was led by former Opposition Leader Bill Shorten of the Australian Labor Party. Prime Ministers Tony Abbott, Malcolm Turnbull and Scott Morrison led the Liberal/National Coalition governments during this time.

== First Shadow Ministry (2013-2016) ==
=== First arrangement ===
Bill Shorten announced the first arrangement of his Shadow Ministry on 18 October 2013. Shadow Assistant Minister for Health Melissa Parke resigned on 17 February 2014 On 4 March, she was replaced in that role by Stephen Jones. Alannah MacTiernan was appointed to Jones's previous role as Shadow Parliamentary Secretary for Regional Development and Infrastructure and was also appointed Shadow Parliamentary Secretary for Western Australia.

On 1 July 2014, Don Farrell's Senate term expired. Farrell's portfolios of Veterans’ Affairs the Centenary of ANZAC were added to those of David Feeney. Amanda Rishworth replaced Farrell in the Ministry as Shadow Assistant Minister for Education and Higher Education. Nick Champion replaced Rishworth as Shadow Parliamentary Secretary for Health. Louise Pratt's Senate term expired at the same time. She was replaced as Shadow Parliamentary Secretary for the Environment, Climate Change and Water by Lisa Singh, whose position as Shadow Parliamentary Secretary to the Shadow Attorney General was taken by Graham Perrett. Joel Fitzgibbon also added the portfolio of Shadow Minister for Rural Affairs to his existing Agriculture portfolio.

==== Shadow cabinet ====
Shadow Minister	Portfolios	Portrait
Bill Shorten MP (Maribyrnong)	Leader of the Opposition; Leader of the Labor Party	
Tanya Plibersek MP (Sydney)	Deputy Leader of the Opposition; Deputy Leader of the Labor Party; Shadow Minister for Foreign Affairs and International Development	
Senator Penny Wong (South Australia)	Leader of the Opposition in the Senate; Shadow Minister for Trade and Investment	
Senator Stephen Conroy (Victoria)	Deputy Leader of the Opposition in the Senate; Shadow Minister for Defence	
Chris Bowen MP (McMahon)	Shadow Treasurer	
Tony Burke MP (Watson)	Shadow Minister for Finance; Manager of Opposition Business in the House	
Mark Dreyfus MP (Isaacs)	Shadow Attorney-General; Shadow Minister for the Arts; Deputy Manager of Opposition Business in the House	
Senator Kim Carr (Victoria)	Shadow Minister for Higher Education, Research, Innovation and Industry; Shadow Minister Assisting the Leader for Science	
Anthony Albanese MP (Grayndler)	Shadow Minister for Infrastructure and Transport; Shadow Minister for Tourism	
Mark Butler MP (Hindmarsh)	Shadow Minister for the Environment, Climate Change and Water	
Jason Clare MP (Blaxland)	Shadow Minister for Communications	
Kate Ellis MP (Adelaide)	Shadow Minister for Education; Shadow Minister for Early Childhood	
Joel Fitzgibbon MP (Hunter)	Shadow Minister for Agriculture; Shadow Minister for Rural Affairs (from 1 July 2014)	
Gary Gray MP (Brand)	Shadow Minister for Resources; Shadow Minister for Northern Australia; Shadow Special Minister of State	
Catherine King MP (Ballarat)	Shadow Minister for Health	
Jenny Macklin MP (Jagajaga)	Shadow Minister for Families and Payments; Shadow Minister for Disability Reform	
Richard Marles MP (Corio)	Shadow Minister for Immigration and Border Protection	
Shayne Neumann MP (Blair)	Shadow Minister for Indigenous Affairs; Shadow Minister for Ageing	
Brendan O’Connor MP (Gorton)	Shadow Minister for Employment and Workplace Relations	

==== Outer Shadow Ministry ====
Shadow Minister	Portfolios	Portrait
Bernie Ripoll MP (Oxley)	Shadow Minister for Financial Services and Superannuation; Shadow Minister for Sport; Shadow Minister Assisting the Leader for Small Business	
Senator Claire Moore (Queensland)	Shadow Minister for Women; Manager of Opposition Business in the Senate; Shadow Minister for Carers; Shadow Minister for Communities	
Senator Don Farrell (South Australia)	Shadow Minister for the Centenary of ANZAC (until 1 July 2014); Shadow Minister for Veterans' Affairs (until 1 July 2014)	
David Feeney MP (Batman)	Shadow Minister for Justice; Shadow Assistant Minister for Defence; Shadow Minister for the Centenary of ANZAC (from 1 July 2014); Shadow Minister for Veterans' Affairs (from 1 July 2014)	
Julie Collins MP (Franklin)	Shadow Minister for Regional Development and Local Government; Shadow Minister for Employment Services	
Andrew Leigh MP (Fenner)	Shadow Assistant Treasurer; Shadow Minister for Competition	
Sharon Bird MP (Cunningham)	Shadow Assistant Minister for Vocational Education	
Michelle Rowland MP (Greenway)	Shadow Minister for Citizenship and Multiculturalism; Shadow Assistant Minister for Communications	
Melissa Parke MP (Fremantle)	Shadow Assistant Minister for Health (until 19 February 2014)	
Stephen Jones MP (Whitlam)	Shadow Assistant Minister for Health (from 4 March 2014)	
Senator Jan McLucas (Queensland)	Shadow Minister for Mental Health; Shadow Minister for Housing and Homelessness	
Senator Doug Cameron (New South Wales)	Shadow Minister for Human Services	
Amanda Rishworth MP (Kingston)	Shadow Assistant Minister for Education (from 24 June 2014); Shadow Assistant Minister for Higher Education (from 24 June 2014)	

==== Shadow Parliamentary Secretaries ====
Shadow Parliamentary Secretary	Portfolios	Portrait
Julie Owens MP (Parramatta)	Shadow Parliamentary Secretary for Education; Shadow Parliamentary Secretary for Small Business	
Jacinta Collins (Victoria)	Shadow Cabinet Secretary; Shadow Parliamentary Secretary to the Leader of the Opposition	
Michael Danby MP (Melbourne Ports)	Shadow Parliamentary Secretary to the Leader of the Opposition; Shadow Parliamentary Secretary for the Arts	
Dr Jim Chalmers MP (Rankin)	Shadow Parliamentary Secretary to the Leader of the Opposition; Shadow Parliamentary Secretary for Trade and Industry	
Matt Thistlethwaite MP (Kingsford Smith)	Shadow Parliamentary Secretary for Foreign Affairs; Shadow Parliamentary Secretary for Immigration	
Gai Brodtmann MP (Canberra)	Shadow Parliamentary Secretary for Defence	
Stephen Jones MP (Throsby)	Shadow Parliamentary Secretary for Regional Development and Infrastructure (until 4 March 2014)	
Alannah MacTiernan MP (Perth)	Shadow Parliamentary Secretary for Regional Development and Infrastructure (from 4 March 2014); Shadow Parliamentary Secretary for Western Australia (from 4 March 2014)	
Warren Snowdon MP (Lingiari)	Shadow Parliamentary Secretary for External Territories; Shadow Parliamentary Secretary for Northern Australia; Shadow Parliamentary Secretary for Indigenous Affairs	
Ed Husic MP (Chifley)	Shadow Parliamentary Secretary to the Shadow Treasurer	
Senator Louise Pratt (Western Australia)	Shadow Parliamentary Secretary for the Environment, Climate Change and Water (until 24 June 2014)	
Tony Zappia MP (Makin)	Shadow Parliamentary Secretary for Manufacturing	
Senator Lisa Singh (Tasmania)	Shadow Parliamentary Secretary to the Shadow Attorney General (until 24 June 2014); Shadow Parliamentary Secretary for the Environment, Climate Change and Water (from 24 June 2014)	
Graham Perrett MP (Moreton)	Shadow Parliamentary Secretary to the Shadow Attorney General (from 24 June 2014)	
Amanda Rishworth MP (Kingston)	Shadow Parliamentary Secretary for Health (until 24 June 2014)	
Nick Champion MP (Wakefield)	Shadow Parliamentary Secretary for Health (from 24 June 2014)	
Carol Brown (politician) (Tasmania)	Shadow Parliamentary Secretary for Families and Payments	
Senator Helen Polley (Tasmania)	Shadow Parliamentary Secretary for Aged Care	

=== Second arrangement ===
==== Shadow Cabinet ====
Michelle Rowland and Katy Gallagher were promoted to the Shadow Cabinet on 13 October 2015. The final arrangement of the Shadow Ministry prior to the 2016 election was announced in October 2015.

Shadow Minister	Portfolios	Portrait
Bill Shorten MP (Maribyrnong)	Leader of the Opposition; Leader of the Labor Party	
Tanya Plibersek MP (Sydney)	Deputy Leader of the Opposition; Deputy Leader of the Labor Party; Shadow Minister for Foreign Affairs and International Development	
Senator Penny Wong (South Australia)	Leader of the Opposition in the Senate; Shadow Minister for Trade and Investment	
Senator Stephen Conroy (Victoria)	Deputy Leader of the Opposition in the Senate; Shadow Minister for Defence	
Chris Bowen MP (McMahon)	Shadow Treasurer	
Michelle Rowland MP (Greenway)	Shadow Minister for Small Business; Shadow Minister for Citizenship and Multiculturalism	
Tony Burke MP (Watson)	Shadow Minister for Finance; Manager of Opposition Business in the House	
Mark Dreyfus MP (Isaacs)	Shadow Attorney-General; Shadow Minister for the Arts; Deputy Manager of Opposition Business in the House	
Senator Kim Carr (Victoria)	Shadow Minister for Higher Education, Research, Innovation and Industry; Shadow Minister Assisting the Leader for Science	
Anthony Albanese MP (Grayndler)	Shadow Minister for Infrastructure and Transport; Shadow Minister for Tourism; Shadow Minister for Cities	
Senator Katy Gallagher (ACT)	Shadow Minister for Mental Health; Shadow Minister for Housing and Homelessness; Shadow Minister Assisting the Leader on State and Territory Relations	
Mark Butler MP (Hindmarsh)	Shadow Minister for the Environment, Climate Change and Water	
Jason Clare MP (Blaxland)	Shadow Minister for Communications	
Kate Ellis MP (Adelaide)	Shadow Minister for Education; Shadow Minister for Early Childhood	
Joel Fitzgibbon MP (Hunter)	Shadow Minister for Agriculture, Fisheries and Forestry; Shadow Minister for Rural Affairs	
Gary Gray MP (Brand)	Shadow Minister for Resources; Shadow Minister for Northern Australia; Shadow Special Minister of State	
Catherine King MP (Ballarat)	Shadow Minister for Health	
Jenny Macklin MP (Jagajaga)	Shadow Minister for Families and Payments; Shadow Minister for Disability Reform	
Richard Marles MP (Corio)	Shadow Minister for Immigration and Border Protection	
Shayne Neumann MP (Blair)	Shadow Minister for Indigenous Affairs; Shadow Minister for Ageing	
Brendan O’Connor MP (Gorton)	Shadow Minister for Employment and Workplace Relations	

==== Outer Shadow Ministry ====
Shadow Minister	Portfolios	Portrait
Senator Claire Moore (Queensland)	Shadow Minister for Women; Manager of Opposition Business in the Senate; Shadow Minister for Carers; Shadow Minister for Communities	
David Feeney MP (Batman)	Shadow Minister for Justice; Shadow Minister for Veterans' Affairs; Shadow Minister for the Centenary of ANZAC; Shadow Assistant Minister for Defence	
Julie Collins MP (Franklin)	Shadow Minister for Regional Development and Local Government; Shadow Minister for Employment Services	
Andrew Leigh MP (Fenner)	Shadow Assistant Treasurer; Shadow Minister for Competition	
Sharon Bird MP (Cunningham)	Shadow Assistant Minister for Vocational Education	
Stephen Jones MP (Whitlam)	Shadow Assistant Minister for Health	
Senator Doug Cameron (New South Wales)	Shadow Minister for Human Services	
Amanda Rishworth MP (Kingston)	Shadow Assistant Minister for Education; Shadow Assistant Minister for Higher Education	
Dr Jim Chalmers MP (Rankin)	Shadow Minister for Sport; Shadow Assistant Minister for Financial Services and Superannuation; Shadow Assistant Minister for Productivity; Shadow Assistant Minister for Trade and Investment	

==== Shadow Parliamentary Secretaries ====
Shadow Parliamentary Secretary	Portfolios	Portrait
Julie Owens MP (Parramatta)	Shadow Parliamentary Secretary for Early Childhood Education; Shadow Parliamentary Secretary for Small Business	
Jacinta Collins (Victoria)	Shadow Cabinet Secretary; Shadow Parliamentary Secretary to the Leader of the Opposition	
Michael Danby MP (Melbourne Ports)	Shadow Parliamentary Secretary to the Leader of the Opposition; Shadow Parliamentary Secretary for the Arts	
Ed Husic MP (Chifley)	Shadow Parliamentary Secretary to the Leader of the Opposition assisting with Digital Innovations and Startups; Shadow Parliamentary Secretary to the Shadow Treasurer	
Terri Butler MP (Griffith)	Shadow Parliamentary Secretary to the Leader of the Opposition; Shadow Parliamentary Secretary for Child Safety and Prevention of Family Violence	
Senator Sam Dastyari (New South Wales)	Shadow Parliamentary Secretary to the Leader of the Opposition; Deputy Manager of Opposition Business in the Senate; Shadow Parliamentary Secretary for School Education and Youth	
Matt Thistlethwaite MP (Kingsford Smith)	Shadow Parliamentary Secretary for Foreign Affairs; Shadow Parliamentary Secretary for Immigration	
Gai Brodtmann MP (Canberra)	Shadow Parliamentary Secretary for Defence	
Alannah MacTiernan MP (Perth)	Shadow Parliamentary Secretary for Regional Development and Infrastructure	
Warren Snowdon MP (Lingiari)	Shadow Parliamentary Secretary for External Territories; Shadow Parliamentary Secretary for Northern Australia; Shadow Parliamentary Secretary for Indigenous Affairs	
Senator Lisa Singh (Tasmania)	Shadow Parliamentary Secretary for the Environment, Climate Change and Water	
Tony Zappia MP (Makin)	Shadow Parliamentary Secretary for Health	
Graham Perrett MP (Moreton)	Shadow Parliamentary Secretary to the Shadow Attorney General	
Nick Champion MP (Wakefield)	Shadow Parliamentary Secretary for Manufacturing	
Carol Brown (politician) (Tasmania)	Shadow Parliamentary Secretary for Families and Payments	
Senator Helen Polley (Tasmania)	Shadow Parliamentary Secretary for Aged Care	

== Second Shadow Ministry (2016-2019) ==
=== Initial arrangement ===
Following the narrow defeat at the 2016 election, the Australian Labor Party re-elected Bill Shorten and Tanya Plibersek as leader and deputy leader respectively. On 23 July 2016, the Shadow Cabinet was announced.

Sam Dastyari resigned from the Ministry on 7 September 2016. He was replaced as Shadow Minister for Consumer Affairs by Tim Hammond and by Katy Gallagher as Manager of Opposition Business in the Senate. Deborah O'Neill replaced Hammond as Shadow Assistant Minister for Innovation, also being appointed Shadow Assistant Minister for Mental Health. Warren Snowdon added the position of Shadow Assistant Minister for Indigenous Health to his existing portfolios. Hammond was not replaced as Shadow Assistant Minister for Digital Economy and Startups or Shadow Assistant Minister for Resources and Western Australia. Instead, Ed Husic was appointed as Shadow Minister for the Digital Economy on 11 October 2016.

In 2017, Kate Ellis announced her intention to retire from Parliament at the next election. She was replaced as Shadow Minister for Early Childhood Education and Development by Amanda Rishworth, who entered the Shadow Cabinet. The TAFE portfolio was given to Doug Cameron and the training portfolio was given to Tanya Plibersek.

Katy Gallagher resigned from the shadow ministry pending a ruling on her eligibility for election to Parliament

==== Shadow cabinet ====
Shadow Minister	Portfolios	Portrait
Bill Shorten MP (Maribyrnong)	Leader of the Opposition; Leader of the Labor Party; Shadow Minister for Indigenous Affairs and Aboriginal and Torres Strait Islanders	
Tanya Plibersek MP (Sydney)	Deputy Leader of the Opposition; Deputy Leader of the Labor Party; Shadow Minister for Women (until 24 October 2017); Shadow Minister for Education (from 24 October 2017); Shadow Minister for Education and Training	
Senator Penny Wong (South Australia)	Leader of the Opposition in the Senate; Shadow Minister for Foreign Affairs	
Senator Stephen Conroy (Victoria)	Deputy Leader of the Opposition in the Senate; Shadow Special Minister of State; Shadow Minister for Sport	
Chris Bowen MP (McMahon)	Shadow Treasurer	
Senator Katy Gallagher (ACT)	Shadow Minister for Small Business and Financial Services; Manager of Opposition Business in the Senate (from 14 September 2016)	
Tony Burke MP (Watson)	Manager of Opposition Business in the House; Shadow Minister for the Arts; Shadow Minister for Citizenship and Multicultural Australia; Shadow Minister for the Environment and Water	
Kate Ellis MP (Adelaide)	Shadow Minister for Early Childhood Education and Development (until 24 October 2017); Shadow Minister for TAFE and Vocational Education (until 24 October 2017)	
Mark Butler MP (Hindmarsh)	Shadow Minister for Climate Change and Energy	
Jenny Macklin MP (Jagajaga)	Shadow Minister for Families and Social Services	
Richard Marles MP (Corio)	Shadow Minister for Defence	
Anthony Albanese MP (Grayndler)	Shadow Minister for Infrastructure, Transport, Cities and Regional Development; Shadow Minister for Tourism	
Dr Jim Chalmers MP (Rankin)	Shadow Minister for Finance	
Brendan O’Connor MP (Gorton)	Shadow Minister for Employment and Workplace Relations	
Mark Dreyfus MP (Isaacs)	Shadow Attorney-General; Shadow Minister for National Security; Deputy Manager of Opposition Business in the House	
Shayne Neumann MP (Blair)	Shadow Minister for Immigration and Border Protection	
Senator Kim Carr (Victoria)	Shadow Minister for Innovation, Industry, Science and Research	
Michelle Rowland MP (Greenway)	Shadow Minister for Communications	
Joel Fitzgibbon MP (Hunter)	Shadow Minister for Agriculture, Fisheries and Forestry; Shadow Minister for Rural and Regional Australia	
Jason Clare MP (Blaxland)	Shadow Minister for Resources and Northern Australia; Shadow Minister for Trade and Investment	
Catherine King MP (Ballarat)	Shadow Minister for Health and Medicare	
Julie Collins MP (Franklin)	Shadow Minister for Ageing and Mental Health	
Amanda Rishworth MP (Kingston)	Shadow Minister for Veterans’ Affairs (outside Shadow Cabinet until 24 October 2017); Shadow Assistant Minister for Defence Personnel (outside Shadow Cabinet until 24 October 2017); Shadow Minister for Early Childhood Education and Development (from 24 October 2017)	

==== Outer Shadow Ministry ====
Shadow Minister	Portfolios	Portrait
Senator Doug Cameron (New South Wales)	Shadow Minister for Skills and Apprenticeships (until 24 October 2017); Shadow Minister for Skills, TAFE and Apprenticeships (from 24 October 2017); Shadow Minister for Housing and Homelessness	
Senator Claire Moore (Queensland)	Shadow Minister for International Development and the Pacific	
Andrew Leigh MP (Fenner)	Shadow Assistant Treasurer; Shadow Minister for Competition and Productivity; Shadow Minister for Charities and Not-for-Profits; Shadow Minister for Trade in Services	
Senator Sam Dastyari (New South Wales)	Shadow Minister for Consumer Affairs (until 7 September 2016); Manager of Opposition Business in the Senate (until 7 September 2016)	
Linda Burney MP (Barton)	Shadow Minister for Human Services	
Carol Brown (politician) (Tasmania)	Shadow Minister for Disability and Carers	
Amanda Rishworth MP (Kingston)	Shadow Minister for Veterans’ Affairs; Shadow Assistant Minister for Defence Personnel	
Stephen Jones MP (Whitlam)	Shadow Minister for Regional Communications; Shadow Minister for Regional Services, Territories and Local Government	
Ed Husic MP (Chifley)	Shadow Minister for Employment Services and Workforce Participation; Shadow Minister for Digital Economy (from 11 October 2016)	
Clare O’Neil MP (Hotham)	Shadow Minister for Justice	
Tim Hammond MP (Brand)	Shadow Minister for Consumer Affairs (from 14 September 2016)	

==== Shadow Assistant Ministers ====
Shadow Assistant Minister	Portfolios	Portrait
Pat Dodson (Western Australia)	Shadow Assistant Minister for Indigenous Affairs and Aboriginal and Torres Strait Islanders	
Jacinta Collins (Victoria)	Shadow Cabinet Secretary; Shadow Assistant Minister for Early Childhood; Shadow Assistant Minister for Citizenship and Multicultural Australia	
Terri Butler MP (Griffith)	Shadow Assistant Minister for Preventing Family Violence; Shadow Assistant Minister for Universities; Shadow Assistant Minister for Equality	
Tim Hammond MP (Brand)	Shadow Assistant Minister for Digital Economy and Startups (until 14 September 2016); Shadow Assistant Minister for Resources and Western Australia (until 14 September 2016); Shadow Assistant Minister for Innovation (until 14 September 2016)	
Senator Helen Polley (Tasmania)	Shadow Assistant Minister to the Leader (Tasmania); Shadow Assistant Minister for Ageing	
Andrew Giles MP (Scullin)	Shadow Assistant Minister for Schools	
Matt Thistlethwaite MP (Kingsford Smith)	Shadow Assistant Minister for Treasury	
Julie Owens MP (Parramatta)	Shadow Assistant Minister for Small Business; Shadow Assistant Minister for Citizenship and Multicultural Australia	
Pat Conroy MP (Shortland)	Shadow Assistant Minister for Climate Change; Shadow Minister Assisting for Infrastructure	
Louise Pratt (Western Australia)	Shadow Assistant Minister for Equality; Shadow Assistant Minister for Universities	
Warren Snowdon MP (Lingiari)	Shadow Assistant Minister for the Centenary of ANZAC; Shadow Assistant Minister for External Territories; Shadow Assistant Minister for Northern Australia; Shadow Assistant Minister for Indigenous Health (from 14 September 2016)	
Gai Brodtmann MP (Canberra)	Shadow Assistant Minister for Cyber Security and Defence Personnel	
Mike Kelly AM MP (Eden-Monaro)	Shadow Assistant Minister for Defence Industry and Support	
Nick Champion MP (Wakefield)	Shadow Assistant Minister for Manufacturing and Science	
Lisa Chesters MP (Bendigo)	Shadow Assistant Minister for Rural and Regional Australia	
Tony Zappia MP (Makin)	Shadow Assistant Minister for Medicare	
Senator Deborah O’Neill (New South Wales)	Shadow Assistant Minister for Innovation (from 14 September 2016); Shadow Assistant Minister for Mental Health (from 14 September 2016)	

=== Final arrangement ===
==== Shadow cabinet ====
Shadow Minister	Portfolios	Portrait
Bill Shorten MP (Maribyrnong)	Leader of the Opposition; Leader of the Labor Party; Shadow Minister for Indigenous Affairs and Aboriginal and Torres Strait Islanders	
Tanya Plibersek MP (Sydney)	Deputy Leader of the Opposition; Deputy Leader of the Labor Party; Shadow Minister for Women; Shadow Minister for Education and Training	
Senator Penny Wong (South Australia)	Leader of the Opposition in the Senate; Shadow Minister for Foreign Affairs	
Senator Don Farrell (South Australia)	Deputy Leader of the Opposition in the Senate; Shadow Special Minister of State; Shadow Minister for Sport	
Chris Bowen MP (McMahon)	Shadow Treasurer; Shadow Minister for Small Business	
Tony Burke MP (Watson)	Manager of Opposition Business in the House; Shadow Minister for the Arts; Shadow Minister for Citizenship and Multicultural Australia; Shadow Minister for the Environment and Water	
Mark Butler MP (Hindmarsh)	Shadow Minister for Climate Change and Energy	
Linda Burney MP (Barton)	Shadow Minister for Families and Social Services; Shadow Minister for Preventing Family Violence	
Richard Marles MP (Corio)	Shadow Minister for Defence	
Amanda Rishworth MP (Kingston)	Shadow Minister for Veterans’ Affairs; Shadow Minister for Defence Personnel; Shadow Minister for Early Childhood Education and Development	
Anthony Albanese MP (Grayndler)	Shadow Minister for Infrastructure, Transport, Cities and Regional Development; Shadow Minister for Tourism	
Jim Chalmers MP (Rankin)	Shadow Minister for Finance	
Brendan O’Connor MP (Gorton)	Shadow Minister for Employment and Workplace Relations	
Mark Dreyfus MP (Isaacs)	Shadow Attorney-General; Shadow Minister for National Security; Deputy Manager of Opposition Business in the House	
Shayne Neumann MP (Blair)	Shadow Minister for Immigration and Border Protection	
Senator Kim Carr (Victoria)	Shadow Minister for Innovation, Industry, Science and Research	
Michelle Rowland MP (Greenway)	Shadow Minister for Communications	
Joel Fitzgibbon MP (Hunter)	Shadow Minister for Agriculture, Fisheries and Forestry; Shadow Minister for Rural and Regional Australia	
Jason Clare MP (Blaxland)	Shadow Minister for Resources and Northern Australia; Shadow Minister for Trade and Investment	
Catherine King MP (Ballarat)	Shadow Minister for Health and Medicare	
Julie Collins MP (Franklin)	Shadow Minister for Ageing and Mental Health	

==== Outer Shadow Ministry ====
Shadow Minister	Portfolios	Portrait
Senator Doug Cameron (New South Wales)	Shadow Minister for Skills, TAFE and Apprenticeships; Shadow Minister for Housing and Homelessness	
Senator Claire Moore (Queensland)	Shadow Minister for International Development and the Pacific	
Andrew Leigh MP (Fenner)	Shadow Assistant Treasurer; Shadow Minister for Competition and Productivity; Shadow Minister for Charities and Not-for-Profits; Shadow Minister for Trade in Services	
Carol Brown (politician) (Tasmania)	Shadow Minister for Disability and Carers	
Stephen Jones MP (Whitlam)	Shadow Minister for Regional Communications; Shadow Minister for Regional Services, Territories and Local Government	
Ed Husic MP (Chifley)	Shadow Minister for Digital Economy; Shadow Minister for Human Services	
Clare O'Neil MP (Hotham)	Shadow Minister for Justice; Shadow Minister for Financial Services	
Madeleine King MP (Brand)	Shadow Minister for Consumer Affairs; Shadow Minister Assisting for Small Business; Shadow Minister Assisting for Resources	
Terri Butler MP (Griffith)	Shadow Minister for Young Australians and Youth Affairs; Shadow Minister for Employment Services, Workforce Participation and Future of Work	

==== Shadow Assistant Ministers ====
Shadow Assistant Minister	Portfolios	Portrait
Pat Dodson (Western Australia)	Shadow Assistant Minister for Indigenous Affairs and Aboriginal and Torres Strait Islanders	
Helen Polley (Tasmania)	Shadow Assistant Minister to the Leader (Tasmania); Shadow Assistant Minister for Ageing	
Andrew Giles MP (Scullin)	Shadow Minister Assisting for Schools	
Matt Thistlethwaite MP (Kingsford Smith)	Shadow Assistant Minister for Treasury; Shadow Assistant Minister for an Australian Head of State	
Julie Owens MP (Parramatta)	Shadow Assistant Minister for Small Business; Shadow Assistant Minister for Citizenship and Multicultural Australia	
Pat Conroy MP (Shortland)	Shadow Assistant Minister for Climate Change; Shadow Minister Assisting for Infrastructure	
Jenny McAllister (New South Wales)	Shadow Assistant Minister for Families and Communities	
Louise Pratt (Western Australia)	Shadow Assistant Minister for Equality; Shadow Assistant Minister for Universities	
Warren Snowdon MP (Lingiari)	Shadow Assistant Minister for the Centenary of ANZAC; Shadow Assistant Minister for External Territories; Shadow Assistant Minister for Indigenous Health; Shadow Assistant Minister for Northern Australia	
Gai Brodtmann MP (Canberra)	Shadow Assistant Minister for Cyber Security and Defence	
Mike Kelly AM MP (Eden-Monaro)	Shadow Assistant Minister for Defence Industry and Support	
Lisa Chesters MP (Bendigo)	Shadow Assistant Minister for Rural and Regional Australia; Shadow Assistant Minister for Workplace Relations	
Tony Zappia MP (Makin)	Shadow Assistant Minister for Medicare	
Deborah O’Neill (New South Wales)	Manager of Opposition Business in the Senate; Shadow Assistant Minister for Innovation; Shadow Assistant Minister for Mental Health	
Glenn Sterle (Western Australia)	Shadow Assistant Minister for Road Safety	

== See also ==
- Cabinet of Australia
- Shadow Ministry of Australia
- Shadow Ministry of Kevin Rudd
- Second Rudd Ministry
- Abbott Ministry
- First Turnbull Ministry
- Second Turnbull Ministry
- First Morrison Ministry
