= History of same-sex marriage in Australia =

The history of same-sex marriage in Australia includes its express prohibition by the Howard government in 2004 and its eventual legalisation by the Parliament in December 2017. Although a same-sex marriage law was passed by the Australian Capital Territory in 2013, it was struck down by the High Court on the basis of inconsistency with federal law. The Court's decision closed the possibility of concurrent state or territory laws that would allow same-sex marriage where federal law did not. A law legalising same-sex marriage passed the Parliament on 7 December 2017 and received royal assent the following day.

Between September 2004 and October 2017, there were 22 unsuccessful attempts in the Federal Parliament to legalise or recognise same-sex marriage under federal law. Former Prime Minister Malcolm Turnbull supported same-sex marriage during his time in office when same-sex marriage was legalised by the Parliament. The Turnbull government went to the 2016 federal election with a policy to put the issue of same-sex marriage to a plebiscite, and was narrowly re-elected, though the legislation to establish the plebiscite was rejected by the Australian Senate in November 2016 and again in August 2017.

Consequently, the government conducted a voluntary postal survey between 12 September and 7 November 2017, ascertaining the views of Australians on legislating for same-sex marriage. The survey did not require parliamentary approval and despite being legally challenged, was upheld by the High Court. The government pledged to facilitate the passage of a private member's bill legalising same-sex marriage in the Parliament if a majority of respondents voted "Yes" in the survey. The results of the survey were announced on 15 November 2017; 61.6% of respondents voted for same-sex marriage.

== Federal law ==
Bills introduced to allow or recognise same-sex marriages under federal law
No	Title
1	Same Sex Relationships (Enduring Equality) Bill 2004
2	Same-Sex Marriages Bill 2006
3	Marriage (Relationships Equality) Amendment Bill 2007
4	Marriage (Relationships Equality) Amendment Bill 2008
5	Same-Sex Marriages Bill 2008
6	Marriage Equality Amendment Bill 2009
7	Marriage Equality Amendment Bill 2010
8	Marriage Amendment Bill 2012
9	Marriage Equality Amendment Bill 2012
10	Marriage Amendment Bill (No. 2) 2012
11	Marriage Equality Amendment Bill 2013
12	Marriage Act Amendment (Recognition of Foreign Marriages for Same-Sex Couples) Bill 2013
13	Marriage Equality Amendment Bill 2013
14	Recognition of Foreign Marriages Bill 2014
15	Freedom to Marry Bill 2014
16	Marriage Amendment (Marriage Equality) Bill 2015
17	Marriage Legislation Amendment Bill 2015
18	Marriage Amendment (Marriage Equality) Bill 2016
19	Marriage Equality Amendment Bill 2013
20	Marriage Legislation Amendment Bill 2016
21	Marriage Legislation Amendment Bill 2016 [No. 2]
22	Freedom to Marry Bill 2016
23	Marriage Amendment (Definition and Religious Freedoms) Bill 2017

The following details the legislative history of marriage law and reform attempts in federal parliament.

=== 23rd Parliament (1959–1961) ===
Previously a matter for the Australian states and territories, uniform national marriage legislation was first introduced by Attorney-General Garfield Barwick of the Liberal Party of Australia 19 May 1960. The Marriage Act 1961 was eventually passed in a conscience vote on 22 March 1961, with an attempt by Victorian Senator George Hannan to insert a definition of marriage as "the voluntary union of one man and one woman for life to the exclusion of all others" rejected in a 40-8 vote. At the 1960 second reading speech Barwick noted that the legislation did not seek to define "marriage" while in 1961 the senator responsible for securing the law's passage in the Senate, John Gorton, suggested that:

in our view it is best to leave to the common law the definition or the evolution of the meaning of ‘marriage’ as it relates to marriages in foreign countries and to use this bill to stipulate the conditions with which marriage in Australia has to comply if it is to be a valid marriage.

Section 46 of the Marriage Act 1961 requires marriage celebrants to explain the legal nature of marriage in Australia to a couple as "the union of a man and a woman to the exclusion of all others, voluntarily entered into for life", in line with the 1866 English case of Hyde v Hyde. Before 2004 these words were descriptive or explanatory, rather than outlining what constitutes a legally valid marriage in Australia.

=== 40th, 41st and 42nd Parliaments (2004–2010) ===
In the later stages of the 40th Parliament, public attention increased with respect to same-sex marriage due to court decisions in Massachusetts and Canada legalising same-sex marriage. Two Australian same-sex couples married in Canada in 2004 and lodged an application in the Family Court of Australia in Victoria, seeking legal recognition of their Canadian marriages. Before their matter could be heard, the Howard government, prompted by a petition organised by Richard Egan of the Australian Christian Lobby, changed the law to prevent Australian recognition of same-sex marriages, rendering the cases pointless.

In an attempt to prevent any judicial imposition of same-sex unions in Australia, the Howard government introduced the Marriage Amendment Act in the Parliament on 27 May 2004. The amendment specified that marriage, undefined in the Act, would be defined as a "union of a man and a woman to the exclusion of all others" and that foreign same-sex marriages would not be recognised as such in Australia. Additional reforms to the Family Law Act prevented same-sex couples from being eligible adoptive parents for children in inter-country adoption arrangements, though these restrictions were eventually relaxed in 2014. The amendment passed the parliament on 13 August 2004 and went into effect on the day it received royal assent, 16 August 2004.

Following the Government's amendment to the Marriage Act banning same-sex marriage, the first attempts at reform came via private members bill's raised in the Senate by Michael Organ of the Greens and Natasha Stott Despoja and Andrew Bartlett of the Democrats. Organ introduced the Same Sex Relationships (Ensuring Equality) Bill 2004 and the Democrats the Same-Sex Marriage Bill 2006 in the following parliament. A further four bills were introduced in the Senate through the period of the Howard and Rudd governments, though all were either rejected or lapsed in parliament. Greens senator Sarah Hanson Young's 2009 bill to legalise same-sex marriage was the first bill of its kind reviewed by a parliamentary committee. In November 2009 the Legal and Constitutional Affairs Legislation Committee, despite recommending reforms designed to create a nationally consistent recognition scheme for same-sex relationships, recommended Ms Hanson-Young's Marriage Equality Amendment Bill 2009 not be passed. In the lead-up to the committee's decision, the largest protests for same-sex marriage in the nation's history took place on 1 August 2009, in a variety of cities across Australia. The bill did reach a vote in the Senate on 25 February 2010. The bill was rejected by a margin of 45 votes to 5, with only the Greens senators voting in favour of the bill and many Senators not in attendance.

=== 43rd Parliament (2010–2013) ===
In the election campaign of 2010, then-Prime Minister Julia Gillard, in an interview with the Australian Christian Lobby, stated that her government would not sponsor or support any bill to legislate for same-sex marriage if successful at the election. Despite narrowly retaining government, the Labor Party were quickly forced into an internal debate on the issue, with several party members publicly speaking out against the party and the leader's opposition to same-sex marriage. At the December 2011 National Conference, Labor overwhelmingly endorsed a change to the party platform, in support of legalising same-sex marriage. Prime Minister Gillard, who had stated her personal objection to same-sex marriage, sponsored a motion to allow MPs and Senators a free vote on same-sex marriage legislation. The motion passed by 208 votes to 184.

In February 2012, two bills to allow same-sex marriage in Australia were introduced in the 43rd Parliament. The Joint Parliamentary Inquiry into the Marriage Equality Amendment Bill 2012 and the Marriage Amendment Bill 2012 received 276,437 responses, the largest response ever received by a committee of the House of Representatives or Senate. 177,663 respondents were in favour of changing the law to recognise same-sex marriage, 98,164 were opposed to and 610 were unsure.

On 19 September 2012, the House of Representatives voted against passing its same-sex marriage bill by a margin of 98-42 votes. On 20 September 2012, the Senate also voted down its same-sex marriage legislation, by a vote of 41-26. In both instances, the Liberal/National Coalition honoured their 2010 election commitment to vote as a bloc against any same-sex marriage legislation.

Details of 2012 parliamentary vote on proposed legalisation of same-sex marriage

Marriage Amendment Bill 2012 Second Reading in House of Representatives
Party	Votes for	Votes against
Labor (63)	38: Anthony Albanese; Sharon Bird; Gai Brodtmann; Mark Butler; Nick Champion; Darren Cheeseman; Jason Clare; Julie Collins; Greg Combet; Simon Crean; Mark Dreyfus; Justine Elliot; Kate Ellis; Peter Garrett; Steve Georganas; Steve Gibbons; Gary Gray; Sharon Grierson; Alan Griffin; Jill Hall (teller); Harry Jenkins; Stephen Jones; Mike Kelly; Catherine King; Kirsten Livermore; Jenny Macklin; Richard Marles; Melissa Parke; Graham Perrett; Tanya Plibersek; Amanda Rishworth; Nicola Roxon; Janelle Saffin (teller); Bill Shorten; Sid Sidebottom; Stephen Smith; Laura Smyth; Warren Snowdon	25: Dick Adams; Chris Bowen; David Bradbury; Tony Burke; Anthony Byrne; Yvette D'Ath; Craig Emerson; Joel Fitzgibbon; Julia Gillard (Prime Minister); Chris Hayes; Ed Husic; Geoff Lyons; Robert McClelland; Daryl Melham; Shayne Neumann; Deborah O'Neill; Julie Owens; Bernie Ripoll; Michelle Rowland; Kevin Rudd; Wayne Swan; Mike Symon; Kelvin Thomson; Maria Vamvakinou; Tony Zappia
Liberal (44)	–	44: Tony Abbott; John Alexander; Kevin Andrews; Bronwyn Bishop; Julie Bishop; Bob Baldwin; Bruce Billson; Jamie Briggs; Russell Broadbent; Craig Kelly; Paul Fletcher; Josh Frydenberg; Teresa Gambaro; Joanna Gash; Alex Hawke; Joe Hockey; Greg Hunt; Steve Irons; Dennis Jensen; Michael Keenan; Sussan Ley; Nola Marino; Louise Markus; Russell Matheson; Sophie Mirabella; Scott Morrison; Judi Moylan; John Murphy; Kelly O'Dwyer; Christopher Pyne; Rowan Ramsey; Don Randall; Andrew Robb; Philip Ruddock; Alby Schultz; Patrick Secker (teller); Tony Smith; Andrew Southcott; Sharman Stone; Dan Tehan; Alan Tudge; Malcolm Turnbull; Mal Washer; Ken Wyatt
Liberal National (19)	–	19: Karen Andrews; Scott Buchholz; George Christensen; Steven Ciobo; Peter Dutton; Ewen Jones; Warren Entsch; Andrew Laming; Ian Macfarlane; Paul Neville; Ken O'Dowd; Jane Prentice; Stuart Robert; Wyatt Roy; Bruce Scott; Alex Somlyay; Warren Truss; Bert van Manen; Ross Vasta
National (6)	–	6: Darren Chester; John Cobb; Mark Coulton (teller); John Forrest; Luke Hartsuyker; Michael McCormack
Country Liberal (1)	–	1: Natasha Griggs
National (1)	–	1: Tony Crook
Greens (1)	1: Adam Bandt	–
Katter's Australian (1)	–	1: Bob Katter
Independent (4)	3: Rob Oakeshott; Craig Thomson; Andrew Wilkie	1: Tony Windsor
Total	42	98

Marriage Amendment Bill (No. 2) 2012 Second Reading in Senate
Party	Votes for	Votes against
Labor (27)	16: Carol Brown (Teller); Doug Cameron; Kim Carr; Trish Crossin; Chris Evans; John Faulkner; Kate Lundy; Gavin Marshall; Anne McEwen; Jan McLucas; Claire Moore; Louise Pratt; Matt Thistlethwaite; Lin Thorp; Anne Urquhart; Penny Wong	11: Catryna Bilyk; Mark Bishop; Jacinta Collins; Stephen Conroy; Don Farrell; Mark Furner; Alex Gallacher; John Hogg; Helen Polley (Teller); Ursula Stephens; Glenn Sterle
Liberal (21)	–	21: Eric Abetz; Chris Back; David Bushby; Michaelia Cash; Richard Colbeck; Mathias Cormann; Sean Edwards; Alan Eggleston; David Fawcett; Concetta Fierravanti-Wells; Mitch Fifield; Bill Heffernan; Gary Humphries; David Johnston; Helen Kroger; Stephen Parry; Marise Payne; Michael Ronaldson; Scott Ryan; Arthur Sinodinos; Dean Smith
Liberal National (4)	–	4: Ron Boswell; Barnaby Joyce; Ian Macdonald; Brett Mason
National (3)	–	3: Bridget McKenzie; Fiona Nash; John Williams
Country Liberal (1)	–	1: Nigel Scullion
Greens (9)	9: Richard Di Natale; Sarah Hanson-Young; Scott Ludlam; Christine Milne; Lee Rhiannon; Rachel Siewert; Larissa Waters; Peter Whish-Wilson; Penny Wright	–
Democratic Labour (1)	–	1: John Madigan
Independent (1)	1: Nick Xenophon	–
Total	26	41

In March 2013, former Labor prime minister Kevin Rudd announced his personal support of same-sex marriage. Upon returning to the prime ministership in June, Rudd promised to introduce same-sex marriage legislation within 100 days if Labor won the 2013 federal election, while granting its members a conscience vote.

=== 44th Parliament (2013–2016) ===
In September 2013, the Tony Abbott-led Liberal/National Coalition comfortably won government at the federal election. Though most Coalition MPs and senators (and Abbott himself) were opposed to same-sex marriage, Abbott stated at the time that the party may consider altering its position to be in favour of a free vote on the matter. By December 2013, deputy Labor Opposition Leader, Tanya Plibersek, announced that she would introduce a private member's bill in the Parliament, seeking the assistance and co-sponsorship of Coalition government minister Malcolm Turnbull and a free vote among all parliamentarians. In the same month, the High Court of Australia struck down a law which briefly legalised same-sex marriage in the Australian Capital Territory, on the basis that only the federal parliament, and not a state or territory parliament, had the legal authority to pass such a law.

In November 2014, Liberal Democratic Party senator David Leyonhjelm reintroduced the Freedom to Marry Bill 2014 in the Senate, though by March 2015 Leyonhjelm had deferred the imminent second reading of his bill due to the refusal of the Coalition party room to debate a free vote on the legislation.

In May 2015, renewed debate on the issue followed the 2015 Irish constitutional referendum that established same-sex marriage in Ireland, with several Coalition MPs publicly voicing their support for a free vote on same-sex marriage legislation and Labor MP Anthony Albanese stating that (contingent on a Liberal Party free vote occurring) "it is my judgment that there are now majorities in favour of marriage equality in both the House of Representatives and the Senate".

Capitalising on the renewed momentum, Labor leader Bill Shorten introduced the Marriage Amendment (Marriage Equality) Bill 2015 to the Parliament on 1 June 2015. Despite several Coalition MPs criticising Shorten for political opportunism, Prime Minister Tony Abbott promised a "very full, frank and candid and decent" debate inside the Liberal Party and also appeared to rule out a referendum on same-sex marriage. Further momentum for same-sex marriage occurred following the U.S. Supreme Court's ruling in Obergefell v. Hodges and in July 2015 details of a cross-party same-sex marriage bill to be introduced to the Parliament later in the year were revealed.

Also in July 2015, at the Labor Party National Conference, the party passed a platform amendment allowing the continuation of a free vote on same-sex marriage legislation for Labor MPs for the then-current and subsequent parliamentary terms. Labor MPs therefore became bound by party policy to support same-sex marriage legislation after the 2019 federal election.

On 11 August 2015, Prime Minister Abbott, in response to the cross-party bill to legalise same-sex marriage being introduced to the parliament, called a special joint party room meeting of the Liberal and National parties. The six-hour meeting resulted in 66 Coalition MPs voting against a free vote being held on same-sex marriage legislation and 33 voting in favour of a free vote. Abbott was accused by Christopher Pyne of "branch stacking" the party room by calling a joint meeting with the largely socially conservative Nationals, as this reduced the prospects of a free vote being endorsed. Following the meeting, Abbott announced that whilst the Coalition would maintain its position of marriage being defined as a heterosexual union for the duration of the existing parliamentary term, he stated it was his "strong disposition" to hold a national vote on same-sex marriage sometime after the 2016 federal election, either in the form of a plebiscite or constitutional referendum. Labor Party Opposition Leader Bill Shorten argued the proposal was a delaying tactic and would waste money, whilst recommitting to introduce a bill to legalise same-sex marriage within 100 days of taking office if successful at the 2016 federal election. On 17 August 2015, in defiance of Mr. Abbott, Liberal backbencher Warren Entsch introduced the aforementioned private members' bill, saying, "a divided nation is what we will be if we continue to allow discrimination in relation to marriage on the basis of a person's sexuality."

On 14 September 2015, Communications Minister Malcolm Turnbull, a prominent supporter of same-sex marriage, challenged Prime Minister Abbott for leadership of the Liberal Party, and became the 29th Prime Minister of Australia. Same-sex marriage lobby groups subsequently began pressuring Prime Minister Turnbull to allow a free vote on Mr Entsch's private members bill or at least bring forward the proposed national plebiscite to the next election or earlier. Mr Turnbull subsequently stated in Question Time that the policy to have a plebiscite on the issue after the next election would be retained by the Coalition.

The issue soon caused tensions within the government with the Assistant Minister for Multicultural Affairs and Social Services Concetta Fierravanti-Wells stating that support of same-sex marriage would "place under threat" some marginal seats held by the Coalition and Liberal senator Dean Smith questioning the precedent a national vote on the issue could set. In January 2016 at least two Liberal MPs (Cory Bernardi and Eric Abetz) stated they would be unlikely to vote in favour of same-sex marriage in parliament even if the proposed plebiscite returned a majority yes result.

Parliamentary committees of both the Senate and House of Representatives were sharply divided on the issue. The Senate Legal and Constitutional Affairs Reference Committee formally recommended that a national plebiscite or referendum not be held on the topic of same-sex marriage, though a dissenting opinion of Coalition senators strongly advocated for a plebiscite. Similarly, a majority of the Parliamentary Joint Committee on Human Rights upheld same-sex marriage as in accordance with international human rights laws and principles, though a dissenting opinion, again of exclusively Coalition senators, criticised the committee for "erroneous" findings and contended that same-sex marriage would "limit the rights of the child", among other concerns. These Coalition senators were subsequently labelled "bigots scraping the bottom of the barrel" by Greens MP Adam Bandt.

On 12 November 2015, Greens Senator Janet Rice introduced another same-sex marriage bill in the 44th Parliament, though debate on the bill was promptly adjourned and the bill was never read a second time. An attempt by the Labor Opposition to suspend parliamentary business and force an immediate debate on a same-sex marriage bill in the House of Representatives was rejected by the Government on 2 March 2016, the house voting down the motion 83 to 57. On 6 March 2016, Attorney-General George Brandis revealed the government would seek to hold the proposed plebiscite in 2016, following that year's election if the government were re-elected. Brandis stated that, in such an event, a bill to amend the Marriage Act would be introduced to the parliament and that he "would expect there is little, virtually no doubt at all that if the public votes 'yes' the parliament will follow". During the course of the 2016 federal election campaign, several Coalition MP's said they would consider voting 'no' to same-sex marriage in the parliament even if a majority of the national electorate voted in favour, creating a split within the Coalition. Turnbull confirmed that Coalition politicians could vote against same-sex marriage regardless of the outcome of a plebiscite. The government was narrowly re-elected at the election.

On 15 April 2016, Australian comedians Rhys Nicholson and Zoë Coombs Marr, who both had separate same-sex partners, married each other at a public event emceed by Hannah Gadsby during the Melbourne International Comedy Festival. The staged wedding was described as "highly effective in keeping the issue of marriage equality in the public eye".

=== 45th Parliament (2016–2019) ===
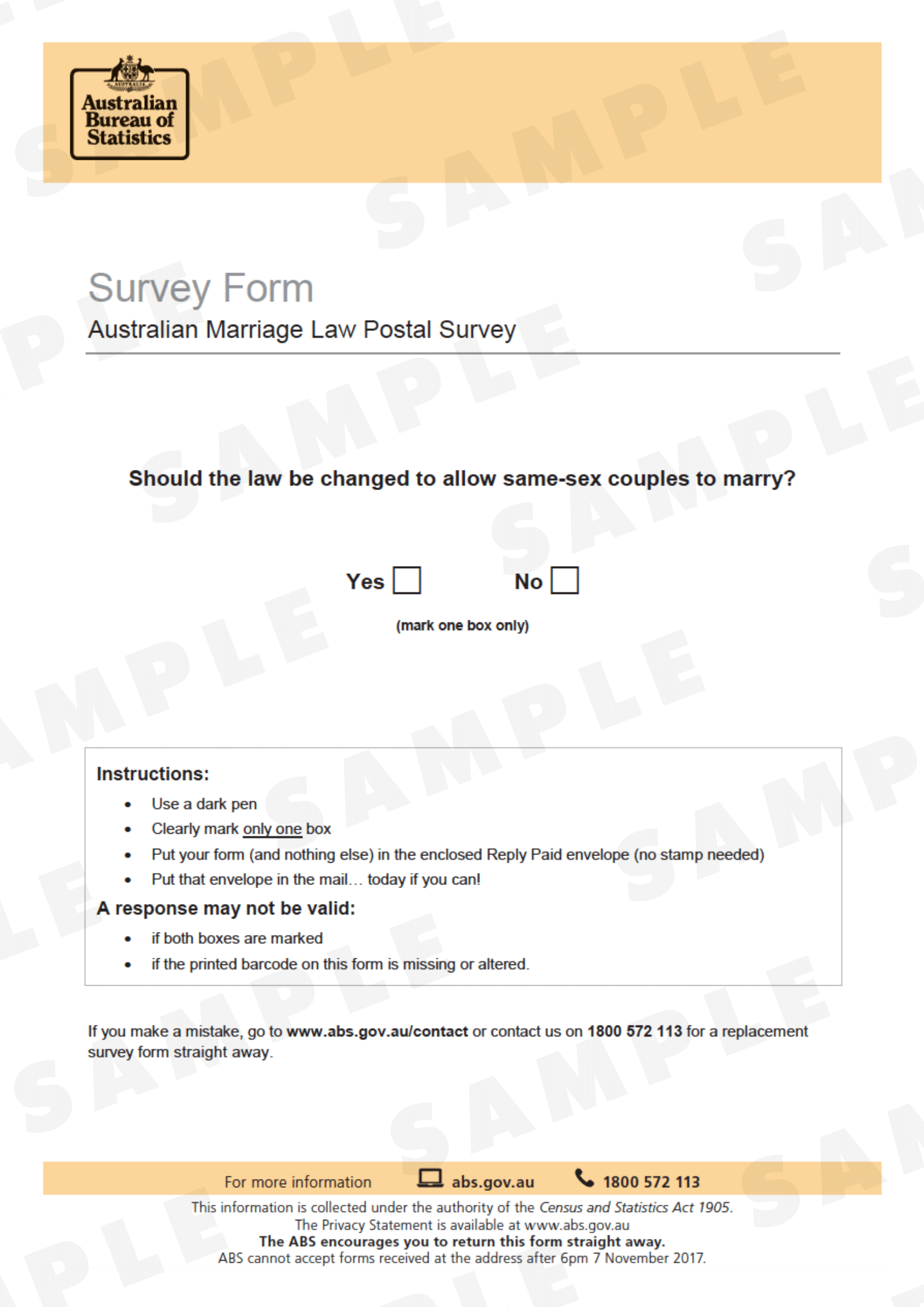
Sample image of the survey form

On 18 July 2016, Prime Minister Turnbull revealed the proposed plebiscite might not occur until the first half of 2017 and left open the possibility of the Senate rejecting legislation to create the plebiscite. Notwithstanding this, Turnbull committed to holding it "as soon as is practicable". The opposition Labor Party supported same-sex marriage in its national platform, while allowing its parliamentary members a conscience vote on same-sex marriage legislation at the time. On 20 August 2016, several media outlets reported that the government would announce an intention to hold the plebiscite in February 2017 whilst several Coalition MPs publicly stated that any defeat of legislation to create the plebiscite would result in the end of debate on the issue for at least 3 years. On 26 August 2016, Greens leader Richard Di Natale confirmed that the party, which holds 9 seats in the Senate, would oppose plebiscite-enabling legislation. Three days later, Nick Xenophon confirmed that his party, made up of three Senators and one member of the House of Representatives, would also vote against plebiscite legislation in the parliament, citing the financial cost of the plebiscite and expressing a desire for same-sex marriage legislation to simply be passed in parliament. The decision meant that, in order for the plebiscite to proceed, it would have needed to receive the support of the opposition Labor Party, who had yet to formally respond to the proposal but had previously labelled it "a second-best option". On 12 September 2016, two private member's bills legalising same-sex marriage were introduced into the House of Representatives, one by Labor leader Bill Shorten and another by Greens MP Adam Bandt.

The commitment that was announced under my prime ministership and which I'm pleased to say has been maintained under the current prime ministership, the commitment is that at least for the life of this Parliament, the Marriage Act will not be changed without putting it to the people first.

— Tony Abbott, former Prime Minister and supporter of a plebiscite on same-sex marriage – 23 March 2017

On 14 September 2016, Prime Minister Turnbull introduced into the House the Plebiscite (Same-Sex Marriage) Bill 2016, the bill to create the plebiscite. Under the provisions of the legislation, Australian voters would be required to write either "yes" or "no" in answer to the question "Should the law be changed to allow same-sex couples to marry?" Additionally, $15 million of taxpayer funding will be equally distributed to the official "yes" and "no" campaigns. If passed by the parliament, the plebiscite would be held on 11 February 2017. On 11 October 2016, the Labor Opposition announced it had officially resolved to oppose the plebiscite legislation, meaning that it lacked majority support in the Senate and the plebiscite could not go ahead. Debate on the Plebiscite (Same-Sex Marriage) Bill 2016 was held in the House between 11–20 October, until the Government moved to end debate on the second reading and move for a vote. The bill passed the House 76–67 votes and moved to the Senate. Debate on the bill was held in the Senate throughout the day and evening of 7 November. The bill was defeated in the Senate at the second reading stage by 33 votes to 29. Following the result in the Senate, Prime Minister Turnbull stated the government had "no plans to take any other measures on this issue".

Details of 2016 Senate vote on same-sex marriage plebiscite

Plebiscite (Same-Sex Marriage) Bill 2016 – Second Reading
Party	Votes for	Votes against	Pairs/Abstentions
Labor (26)	–	22: Catryna Bilyk (teller); Carol Brown; Doug Cameron; Kim Carr; Anthony Chisholm; Jacinta Collins; Sam Dastyari; Pat Dodson; Don Farrell; Alex Gallacher; Katy Gallagher; Kimberley Kitching; Sue Lines; Jenny McAllister; Malarndirri McCarthy; Claire Moore; Deborah O'Neill; Helen Polley; Louise Pratt; Glenn Sterle; Murray Watt; Penny Wong	4: Chris Ketter; Gavin Marshall; Lisa Singh; Anne Urquhart
Liberal (21)	15: Chris Back; Simon Birmingham; David Bushby (teller); Michaelia Cash; Mathias Cormann; Jonathon Duniam; David Fawcett; Concetta Fierravanti-Wells; Mitch Fifield; Jane Hume; Stephen Parry (The President); Marise Payne; Linda Reynolds; Anne Ruston; Zed Seselja	–	6: Eric Abetz; Cory Bernardi; James Paterson; Scott Ryan; Arthur Sinodinos; Dean Smith (Abstained)
Greens (9)	–	7: Sarah Hanson-Young; Nick McKim; Lee Rhiannon; Janet Rice; Rachel Siewert; Larissa Waters; Peter Whish-Wilson	2: Richard Di Natale; Scott Ludlam
Liberal National (5)	5: George Brandis; Ian Macdonald; James McGrath; Matt Canavan; Barry O'Sullivan	–	–
One Nation (4)	4: Brian Burston; Rod Culleton; Pauline Hanson; Malcolm Roberts	–	–
National (3)	3: Bridget McKenzie; Fiona Nash; John Williams	–	–
Xenophon Team (3)	–	3: Stirling Griff; Skye Kakoschke-Moore; Nick Xenophon	–
Country Liberal (1)	–	–	1: Nigel Scullion
Lambie Network (1)	1: Jacqui Lambie	–	–
Justice (1)	–	1: Derryn Hinch	–
Liberal Democrats (1)	1: David Leyonhjelm	–	–
Total	29	33	13

A Senate committee was subsequently launched to discuss the text of the Government's draft same-sex marriage bill, which was published by the Attorney-General's office during the parliamentary debate on the plebiscite. The bill was to have been debated in (and likely passed by) the parliament in the event the plebiscite proceeded and achieved a majority 'yes' vote. The committee gathered submissions from lawyers, religious and social service groups, with particular consternation regarding provisions in the bill allowing civil celebrants to refuse to officiate at same-sex marriages. The bill would also allow religious bodies and organisations scope to refuse to provide goods and services "reasonably incidental" to the solemnisation of a same-sex marriage. During committee hearings, opponents of same-sex marriage requested additional religious freedom protections in the event of same-sex marriage ever being legalised. The committee issued its findings to the Senate and public on 15 February 2017. Significant among the committee's findings was a unanimous recommendation that a new subdivision of marriage celebrant, titled Religious Marriage Celebrants, be created to capture civil celebrants of a religious inclination who would be given the same protections afforded to ministers of religion. The committee also rejected the proposal to allow civil celebrants to refuse to perform same-sex weddings on the basis of "conscientious belief", declaring there was no need to "disturb decades of anti-discrimination law and practice in Australia".

On 4 February 2017, several Coalition MPs supporting same-sex marriage stated to Fairfax Media they would push to abandon the government's plebiscite policy over the following fortnight in favour of a free vote on the floor of Parliament. A number of conservative Coalition MPs subsequently stated that such a move would be a "betrayal" of trust with the electorate and pledged to fight any attempt to change Coalition policy on the issue. Following the publication of the Senate Committee's report into the Attorney-General's draft bill (see above), speculation increased that the report could form the basis for a cross-party same-sex marriage bill in the Senate, to be co-sponsored by gay Liberal Party Senator Dean Smith, Labor, the Greens, the Nick Xenophon Team and possibly Senator Derryn Hinch. By mid-March, the issue had once again split the government, with a private and sustained effort by moderate Liberal MPs to move for a free vote allegedly hitting a "brick wall" following opposition by more conservative members of the party room. Those opposed to the reform in the Coalition government argued a recent public letter urging the Prime Minister to legislate for same-sex marriage, signed by 20 of Australia's most prominent CEO's, constituted an effort to "bully" the government and thus made it less likely a free vote in the parliament would happen. Subsequently, it was revealed in a Senate Committee hearing that the government had sought official advice on conducting a plebiscite via postal mail, a proposal which received a mixed response. Soon after that the issue of same-sex couples being unable to divorce in Australia following a marriage in an overseas jurisdiction (where same-sex marriage is legal) emerged. In August 2017, the United Nations Human Rights Committee ruled that the lack of an official same-sex divorce scheme in Australia constituted a breach of human rights and stated the Government of Australia was obliged to provide "an effective remedy".

If the Liberals come out with a [conscience] vote, it won't be me only, the whole show would blow up...Turnbull's leadership would become untenable and he'd no longer be prime minister. They'd push for Peter Dutton or Greg Hunt as leader and deputy leader or we'd be going to a general election.

— Andrew Broad, National Party MP for the Division of Mallee – 7 August 2017

Liberal MPs who raised the prospect of a free vote in the party in June 2017 had their advances rejected by several members of the Coalition who insisted no change could be made without first having a plebiscite. On 9 July 2017, Liberal Senator Dean Smith announced he was drafting a bill to legalise same-sex marriage. The bill would include legal protections for celebrants who did not wish to perform same-sex marriages. Smith stated he intended to bring the bill to the Liberal party room for debate in due course with the hope of having a conscience vote on the legislation before the end of the year, though the prospect of crossing the floor was also raised. The move was countered by a fresh push from several conservative members of the government, including Immigration Minister Peter Dutton, to instead have a plebiscite conducted by postal mail.

The issue was brought before the Liberal party room on 7 August 2017, when Parliament resumed sitting following the winter break. Up to five Liberal MPs in the lower house and one Senator stated they would consider crossing the floor to bring on debate on a same-sex marriage bill, even if the party rejected a free vote and maintained its plebiscite policy. The legislation, drafted by Senator Smith, was revealed the day prior to the party room meeting. In response to the prospect of the Liberal Party potentially moving to a free vote, Nationals MP Andrew Broad stated he would quit the Coalition and sit on the crossbench, saying the likely outcome of such a decision would be the fall of the Turnbull government.

At the party room meeting, an overwhelming majority of MPs voted to maintain the plebiscite policy, moving for the legislation to be put back to the Senate the same week. In the event the legislation was again rejected by the Senate, the government committed to conduct a voluntary survey by postal mail, which it claimed did not require legislative approval to proceed. Several same-sex marriage groups disagreed and committed to challenge the postal survey in the High Court.

The government released details of the proposed postal survey the following day, claiming the power to organise it under the provisions of existing Commonwealth legislation governing the Australian Bureau of Statistics. Ballots would be mailed out to Australian voters from 12 September and would be required to be mailed back by 7 November, with a result expected no later than 15 November 2017. If the postal survey returned a majority 'yes' verdict, the government announced it would facilitate a private member's bill in the final sitting fortnight of the parliamentary year which would legalise same-sex marriage.

On 9 August 2017, the Senate rejected a government-initiated motion to debate the Plebiscite (Same-Sex Marriage) Bill 2016, the vote on the motion tied at 31-31. This cleared the way for the Finance Minister, Mathias Cormann, to make an immediate appropriation to the Australian Bureau of Statistics (ABS) the purpose of conducting the postal survey. The Treasurer, Scott Morrison, then issued an official direction to the ABS, requiring it to collect information relating to the people's views on same-sex marriage. The direction stated that the last day citizens would have to include their information on the electoral roll would be 24 August 2017. Immediately following the failed motion in the Senate, same-sex marriage advocates Shelley Argent (national spokeswoman of Parents and Friends of Lesbians and Gays) and Felicity Marlowe (head of Rainbow Families), along with independent MP Andrew Wilkie, announced they would challenge the legality of the postal survey in the High Court. The group cited three chief legal concerns with the postal survey:

- whether the government may be exceeding its executive authority.
- whether the direction to conduct the vote and the appropriation to pay for it are in fact "urgent", as necessitated by the Appropriations Act.
- whether the Australian Bureau of Statistics has the legal authority to administer a national vote of this kind given that a postal vote on same-sex marriage may not be considered "statistic gathering" of the sort the ABS is authorised to undertake.

On 10 August, the Human Rights Law Centre filed a legal action on behalf of Australian Marriage Equality and Greens Senator Janet Rice. The court agreed to hear arguments in the cases on 5 and 6 September 2017. On 7 September 2017, the court handed down its ruling, finding that the survey was lawful and allowing it to proceed as scheduled.

The survey was held between 12 September and 7 November 2017. The results of the survey, released on 15 November, granted victory to the "yes" campaign, who won with 61.6% of the vote. The government responded by confirming it would facilitate the passage of a private member's bill legalising same-sex marriage before the end of the year. The bill to that effect, the Marriage Amendment (Definition and Religious Freedoms) Bill 2017, was introduced by Senator Dean Smith.

The bill amends Section 5 of the Marriage Act to define marriage in Australia as the union of "2 people". It also removes the ban on overseas same-sex marriages being recognised in Australia, including ones that occurred before the expected law change. Additionally, the bill includes protections for religious celebrants, ministers of religion and bodies established for a religious purpose, to not be obligated to perform or provide services and facilities to marriages they objected to. The bill passed the Senate by 43 votes to 12 on 29 November 2017. Several amendments to the bill proposed by conservative Coalition MPs, designed to increase protections and exemptions offered to individuals and businesses opposed to same-sex marriage, were defeated. The bill passed the House of Representatives without amendment on 7 December 2017. The bill then received royal assent from the Governor-General on 8 December 2017, becoming a formal Act of Parliament. It went into effect on 9 December 2017. Same-sex marriages lawfully entered into overseas became recognised from that date, and the first weddings under the amended law occurred (after the normal one-month waiting period) from 9 January 2018. Within a week of the legislation's passing, at least one same-sex couple, married under the laws of another country, had applied for a divorce. Several same-sex couples successfully applied for an exemption from the one-month waiting period between completing a notice of intended marriage form and the wedding ceremony, and the first legal same-sex wedding under Australian law was held on 15 December 2017, with further weddings occurring the following day.

== State and territory laws ==
States and territories have long had the ability to create laws with respect to relationships, though Section 51 (xxi) of the Constitution of Australia prescribes that marriage is a legislative power of the federal parliament.

In December 2013, the High Court of Australia ruled, in relation to a territory-based same-sex marriage law of the Australian Capital Territory (ACT), that the federal Marriage Act, which defined marriage as the union of a man and woman, precluded states and territories from legislating for same-sex marriage. As a result, only the federal parliament can legislate for same-sex marriage, whilst states and territories almost certainly cannot.

Since the Commonwealth introduced the Marriage Act Cth. 1961, marriage laws in Australia have been regarded as an exclusive Commonwealth power. The precise rights of states and territories with respect to creating state-based same-sex marriage laws have been complicated since the Howard government amendment to the Marriage Act in 2004 to define marriage as the exclusive union of one man and one woman, to the exclusion of all others. In their December 2013 ruling striking down the ACT's same-sex marriage law, the High Court effectively determined that all laws with respect to marriage were an exclusive power of the Commonwealth and that no state or territory law legalising same-sex marriage or creating any type of marriage could operate concurrently with the federal Marriage Act; "the kind of marriage provided for by the [Marriage] Act is the only kind of marriage that may be formed or recognised in Australia". As a result, the only possible method for same-sex marriage legalisation to occur in Australia is via legislation passed into law by the Federal Parliament only.

Prior to that ruling, reports released by the New South Wales Parliamentary Committee on Social Issues and the Tasmanian Law Reform Institute have found that a state parliament "has the power to legislate on the topic of marriage, including same-sex marriage. However, if New South Wales chooses to exercise that power and enact a law for same-sex marriage, the law could be subject to challenge in the High Court of Australia" and that no current arguments "present an absolute impediment to achieving state-based or Commonwealth marriage equality". With respect to territories, the ACT Government obtained legal advice that its bill seeking to legalise same-sex marriage could operate concurrently with the federal Government's statutory ban on recognising same-sex marriage. The Abbott government's acting Solicitor-General advised the federal Attorney-General, George Brandis, that the ACT's same-sex marriage law was inconsistent with the federal Government's laws whilst other experts rated the ACT's law as 'doubtful' or impossible to pass judicial scrutiny. Those experts were proven correct, when on 12 December 2013, the High Court of Australia struck down the Australian Capital Territory's same-sex marriage law.

Aside from the Australian Capital Territory, Tasmania is the only other state or territory to have passed same-sex marriage legislation in a chamber of its legislature. The state lower house passed same-sex marriage legislation by 13-11 votes in September 2012, though the state upper house subsequently voted against this legislation a few weeks later by a vote of 8-6. Both houses have since passed motions giving in-principle, symbolic support for same-sex marriage.

New South Wales amended its law in November 2014 to allow overseas same-sex marriages to be recognised on the state's relationship register.

As of December 2016, six Australian jurisdictions (Tasmania, Australian Capital Territory, New South Wales, South Australia, Queensland and Victoria), comprising 90% of Australia's population, recognise same-sex marriages and civil partnerships performed overseas, providing automatic recognition of such unions in their respective state registers.

=== Australian Capital Territory ===
On 13 September 2013, the Australian Capital Territory (ACT) Government announced that it would introduce a bill to legalise same-sex marriage, following a decade-long attempt to legislate in the area. "We've been pretty clear on this issue for some time now and there's overwhelming community support for this", Chief Minister Katy Gallagher said. "We would prefer to see the federal parliament legislate for a nationally consistent scheme, but in the absence of this we will act for the people of the ACT. The Marriage Equality Bill 2013 will enable couples who are not able to marry under the Commonwealth Marriage Act 1961 to enter into marriage in the ACT. It will provide for solemnisation, eligibility, dissolution and annulment, regulatory requirements and notice of intention in relation to same-sex marriages." On 10 October 2013, federal Attorney-General George Brandis confirmed that the Commonwealth Government would challenge the proposed ACT bill, stating that the Coalition Government has significant constitutional concerns with respect to the bill. The bill was debated in the ACT Legislative Assembly on 22 October 2013, and passed by 9 votes to 8.

Under the legislation, same-sex marriages were legally permitted from 7 December 2013.

As soon as the ACT act had been passed, the Commonwealth launched a challenge to it in the High Court, which delivered judgment on 12 December 2013. As to the relation between the ACT act and federal legislation, the Court found that the ACT act was invalid and of "no effect", because it was "inconsistent", in terms of the Australian Capital Territory Self-Government Act 1988 (Cth), with the federal Marriage Act 1961 (Cth). It was inconsistent both because its definition of marriage conflicted with that in the federal act and because the federal act was exclusive, leaving no room for any other definition in legislation of a state or a territory. However, the Court went on to determine that the word "marriage" in Constitution s51(xxi) includes same-sex marriage, thus clarifying that there is no constitutional impediment to the Commonwealth legislating for same-sex marriage in the future. It can do so by amending the definition of "marriage" in the Marriage Act.

== Position of political parties ==
Political support for same-sex marriage has lagged behind public opinion. When marriage was officially restricted to opposite-sex couples by the Commonwealth Parliament in 2004, both the Coalition and the Australian Labor Party voted to prevent same-sex marriage, with the Australian Greens consistently in favour. Since that time, Labor has moved to supporting same-sex marriage (with members bound to vote in favour from 2019) while a number of Coalition politicians have also expressed their support for same-sex marriage. The political shift in favour of same-sex marriage is attributed to the weakening political influence of social conservatives, including the Australian Christian Lobby.

Official party positions on same-sex marriage
Party		Year	Leader(s)	Position	Notes
ALP	Australian Labor Party	2004-2011	Mark Latham, Kim Beazley, Kevin Rudd (PM), Julia Gillard (PM)	Oppose	Under the leadership of Mark Latham in 2004, Labor supported the statutory ban on same-sex marriage to appease its right-wing factions and avoid losing electorates in western Sydney. The right-wing factions were historically linked to socially conservative elements of the Roman Catholic Church, while western Sydney contained a higher proportion of immigrants, who statistically are more hostile to same-sex marriage. After being elected to government under Kevin Rudd in 2007, the party maintained its opposition to same-sex marriage. The policy was maintained by Julia Gillard after she replaced Rudd, with her pledging to the Australian Christian Lobby not to introduce same-sex marriage after the 2010 election. By opposing same-sex marriage during this time, both Rudd and Gillard sought to increase the ALP's appeal to aspirational socially conservative voters.
ALP	Australian Labor Party	2011-2019	Julia Gillard (PM), Kevin Rudd (PM), Bill Shorten	Support (conscience vote); no public vote	Although Gillard maintained her opposition to same-sex marriage in 2011, internal lobbying resulted in a change to the party platform at the 2011 national conference when the party voted to support same-sex marriage in its platform. Gillard sponsored a motion to allow Labor politicians a conscience vote rather than bind them to the new policy, which was passed 208-184. After Gillard was deposed by Rudd, he promised to introduce same-sex marriage legislation within 100 days if Labor won the 2013 election while allowing a conscience vote for ALP politicians. After the Coalition changed its policy in favour of a public vote on the issue, new leader Bill Shorten indicated the ALP's opposition despite having expressed support for a public vote in 2013. The ALP caucus confirmed its opposition to a plebiscite in 2016 and voted both times against the Coalition's plebiscite bill in the Senate.
ALP	Australian Labor Party	2019	Bill Shorten	Support (no conscience vote)	At the 2015 Labor Party national conference, Tanya Plibersek and the Left faction agitated for Labor MPs to be bound to vote in favour of same-sex marriage. Following negotiations with leader Bill Shorten, the party compromised by passing a platform amendment allowing the continuation of a free vote on same-sex marriage legislation for Labor MPs for two more terms, with MPs bound by party policy to support same-sex marriage legislation from the 46th Parliament onwards.
LIB / NAT	Coalition (Liberal Party and Nationals)	2004-2015	John Howard (PM), Brendan Nelson, Malcolm Turnbull, Tony Abbott (PM)	Oppose; no conscience vote	During the Howard government, Coalition policy was strongly against same-sex marriage and introduced legislation to ban it. In addition to his personal beliefs, Howard used anti-LGBT policies as a wedge issue against the opposition Australian Labor Party.
LIB / NAT	Coalition (Liberal Party and Nationals)	2015–present	Tony Abbott (PM), Malcolm Turnbull (PM)	Subject to public vote (no conscience vote)	The official policy of opposition persisted until backbench pressure led to Tony Abbott introducing a policy to hold a plebiscite, which was retained by his successor Malcolm Turnbull. Turnbull was criticised by LGBT advocates for maintaining a policy for internal party politics that he had previously opposed. The issue is a divisive one in the Liberal Party. Whilst an overwhelming majority of Liberal MPs support a vote of the people prior to any change to the law, some Liberals such as Tony Abbott advocate a 'no' vote whilst others such as Simon Birmingham have indicated their willingness to campaign for a 'yes' vote. Coalition MPs will be free to vote against same-sex marriage regardless of the outcome of the public vote.
GRN	Australian Greens	2004–present	Bob Brown, Christine Milne, Richard Di Natale	Support; no public vote	The Greens have consistently voted in favour of same-sex marriage since 2004, using the tag line "Every vote. Every MP. Every time" in election advertising. They opposed the 2016 plebiscite proposal. Greens Senator Sarah Hanson-Young and leader Richard Di Natale confirmed the party would advocate for a 'yes' vote if legal challenges to the survey were unsuccessful. Greens Senator Janet Rice was a party to a failed High Court challenge to the postal survey.
CON	Australian Conservatives	2016–present	Cory Bernardi	Oppose; support public vote	Bernardi formed a close relationship with lobby groups Australian Christian Lobby and Marriage Alliance during the plebiscite debate and has issued statements opposing same-sex marriage on several occasions.
LDP	Liberal Democratic Party	2014–present	David Leyonhjelm	Support; support public vote	As libertarians, the LDP and Leyonhjelm have consistently supported same-sex marriage. Although initially opposed to the Coalition's plebiscite proposal, Leyonhjelm later supported it on the basis that allowing a public vote would be the fastest way to bring about the change.
JLN	Jacqui Lambie Network	2013–present	Jacqui Lambie	Neutral; support public vote	Although Lambie is opposed to same-sex marriage and has voted against it, she supports a public vote and would vote in favour if a majority of Australians voted to support change.
ONP	Pauline Hanson's One Nation	2016–present	Pauline Hanson	Neutral; support public vote	At the 2016 election, Hanson indicated that the party would prefer a "referendum rather than a plebiscite" for the introduction of same-sex marriage. Hanson also stated that although she did not personally support same-sex marriage, if a majority of Australians voted in favour of it in a plebiscite, she would vote for it in the Senate.
DHJP	Derryn Hinch's Justice Party	2016–present	Derryn Hinch	Support; no public vote	Hinch supports same-sex marriage and opposes a public vote as a waste of money.
KAP	Katter's Australian Party	2013–present	Bob Katter	Oppose; support public vote	Katter's strong opposition to same-sex marriage is reflected in his party's platform, although one candidate expressed support for same-sex marriage in the past, which led to internal divisions. Katter voted in favour of the Coalition's proposed plebiscite.
NXT	Nick Xenophon Team	2016–present	Nick Xenophon	Support; no public vote	NXT members support same-sex marriage and oppose holding a plebiscite on the grounds that the issue should be resolved by Parliament, a plebiscite would be non-binding and the cost of a public vote is wasteful.

As of 2026, the Family First Party supports repealing the same-sex marriage laws and the Australian Christians party supports marriage as the bond of union between a man and a woman.

=== Independents ===
In the House of Representatives, Andrew Wilkie and Cathy McGowan support same-sex marriage and prefer a parliamentary vote. In the Senate, independent Senator for South Australia Lucy Gichuhi, who opposes same-sex marriage, voted in favour of the Coalition's proposed plebiscite in 2017.

== See also ==
- Same-sex marriage in Australia
- LGBT rights in Australia
- Australian Marriage Law Postal Survey
- 2024 Cumberland book ban
