= 44th Parliament of Australia =

2013–2016 Australian legislative term

44th Parliament of the Commonwealth of Australia
- 43rd ← → 45th
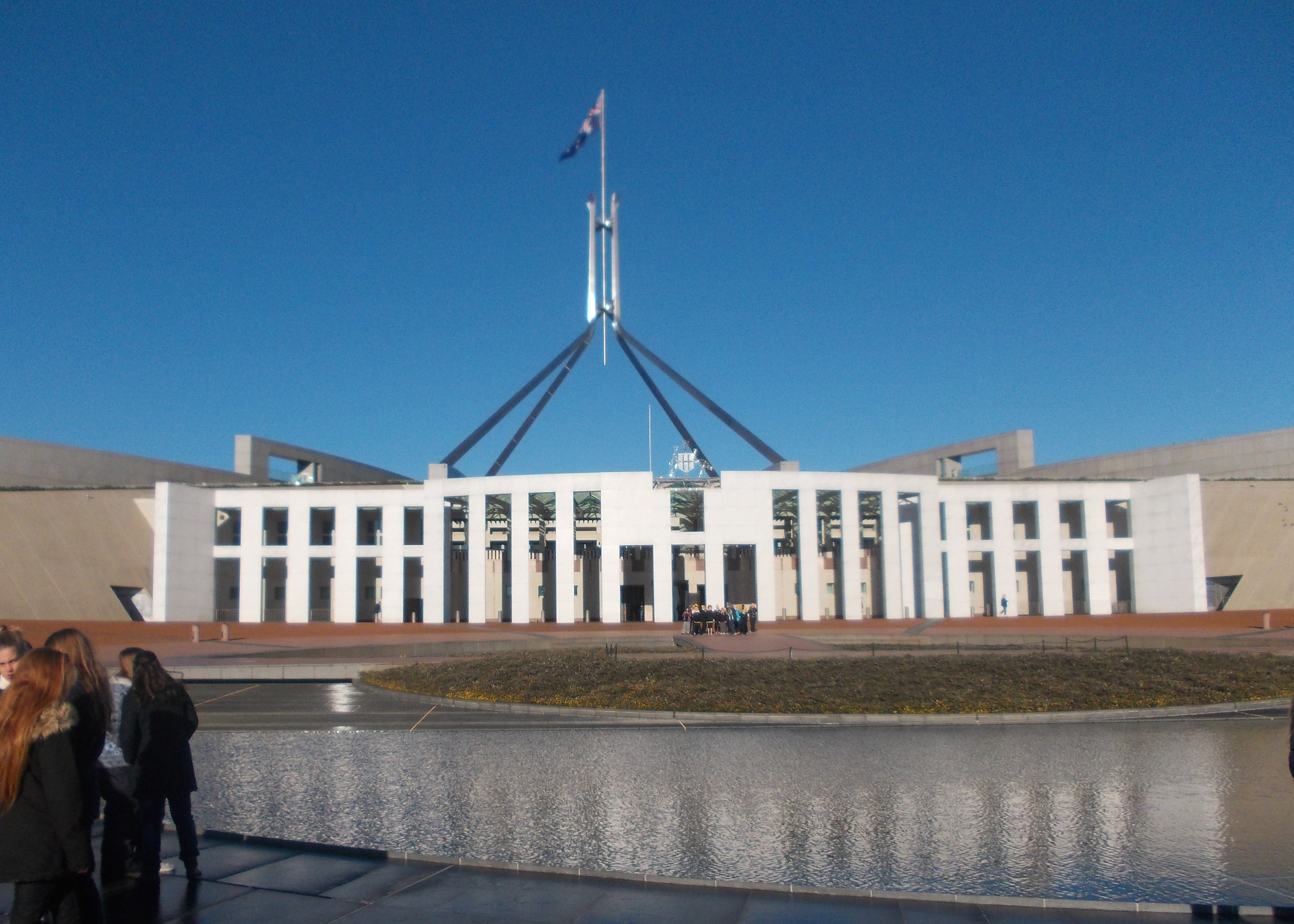
- Parliament House(2014) Parliament House (2014)

12 November 2013 – 9 May 2016
- Members: 76 senators 150 representatives
- Senate Leader: Eric Abetz (until 21 September 2015); George Brandis (from 21 September 2015)
- Senate President: Stephen Parry (from 7 July 2014)
- House Leader: Christopher Pyne (from 12 November 2013)
- House Speaker: Bronwyn Bishop (until 2 August 2015); Tony Smith (from 10 August 2015)

Sessions
- 1st: 12 November 2013 – 15 April 2016; 2nd: 18 April 2016 – 5 May 2016

The 44th Parliament of Australia was a meeting of the legislative branch of the Australian federal government, composed of the Australian Senate and the Australian House of Representatives.

== Composition ==

Government (90)
Coalition
Liberal (58)
LNP (22)
National (9)
CLP (1)

Opposition (55)
Labor (55)

Crossbench (5)
Green (1)
Palmer (1)
Katter (1)
Independent (2) (Note: The two independents elected were: Cathy McGowan Andrew Wilkie (first elected in 2010))

== Major events ==
- 18 November 2013: Material leaked by NSA contractor Edward Snowden reveals that Australian intelligence agencies had attempted to tap the phones of the President of Indonesia, his wife, and other officials. In response, Indonesia recalls its ambassador, and threatens other consequences.
- 10 December 2013: Federal Environment Minister Greg Hunt approves the expansion of the controversial Abbot Point coal terminal in north Queensland.
- 11 December 2013: Car manufacturer Holden announces it will cease production of vehicles in Australia by 2017
- 13 December 2013: Prime Minister, Tony Abbott, holds his first Council of Australian Governments (COAG) meeting. The states and territories agree to have sole responsibility for the environmental assessment of major developments and to focus on boosting the school attendance rates of Indigenous children. It is confirmed that the national paid parental leave scheme will include state public servants.
- 18 December 2013: The Federal Government unveils its $100 million assistance package to help Holden and the manufacturing industry.
- 20 December 2013: A two-hour siege took place outside Sydney's Parliament House when a man in his car threatened to set himself alight.
- 23 December 2013: A Royal Commission into the Rudd Government's home insulation scheme begins in Brisbane.
- 26 December 2013: Acting Prime Minister, Warren Truss, announces that Australia will provide two military aircraft to South Sudan to aid in the current military crisis.
- 30 December 2013: Cyclone Christine intensifies into a category 3 cyclone causing heavy rainfall across a large section of the West Australian Pilbara coast. The towns of Roebourne and Wickham receive significant damage.
- 4 January 2014: Stradbroke Island suffers bushfires which burn out over 8,500 hectares (21,000 acres) of bushland.
- 12–15 January 2014: Perth Hills Fire; A total of 55 homes were razed, 1 fatality, and a damage bill in excess of $13 million.
- 15–20 January 2014:Grampians Fire – A fire starts as a result of lightning strikes in the northern Grampians National Park on 15 January. Extreme fire conditions on 17 January saw the fire grow in size to over 50,000 hectares (120,000 acres). The fire was brought under control on 18 January. By the time the fire is contained on 20 January, it had burnt out 55,000 hectares (140,000 acres) hectares. The estimated losses included 90 structures, 32 homes and 3000 sheep.
- 20 January 2014: New South Wales Premier Barry O'Farrell uses special legislation to cancel three coal licences worth hundreds of millions of dollars issued by corrupt former Labor minister Ian Macdonald and deny the companies that own them any compensation.
- 23 January 2014: Prime Minister Tony Abbott addresses the World Economic Forum in Davos, Switzerland.

== Leadership ==
=== Senate ===
==== Presiding officer ====
- President of the Senate: Stephen Parry

==== Government leadership ====
- Leader of the Government: Eric Abetz, until 21 September 2015
  - George Brandis, from 21 September 2015
- Deputy Leader of the Government: George Brandis, until 21 September 2015
  - Mathias Cormann, from 21 September 2015
- Chief Government Whip: David Bushby
- Deputy Government Whips: David Fawcett; Anne Ruston, until 13 October 2015.
  - Dean Smith, from 13 October 2015
- Manager of Government Business: Mitch Fifield

==== Opposition leadership ====
- Leader of the Opposition: Penny Wong
- Chief Opposition Whip: Anne McEwen
- Deputy Opposition Whips: Catryna Bilyk; Anne Urquhart
- Manager of Opposition Business: Claire Moore

=== House of Representatives ===
==== Presiding officer ====
- Speaker of the House: Bronwyn Bishop, until 2 August 2015
  - Tony Smith, from 2 August 2015

==== Government leadership ====
- Leader of the House: Christopher Pyne
- Chief Government Whip:
- Government Whips:

==== Opposition leadership ====
- Manager of Opposition Business: Tony Burke
- Chief Opposition Whip: Chris Hayes
- Opposition Whips: Jill Hall, Joanne Ryan

== Party Summary ==
=== Senate ===
Senate membership (from 2013)

Affiliation	Party (shading shows control)											Total
Affiliation	AG	ALP	IND	DL	Coalition			AMEP	FFP	LDP	PUP	Total
Affiliation	AG	ALP	IND	DL	LP	NATS	CLP	AMEP	FFP	LDP	PUP	Total
End of previous Parliament												
Begin (12 November 2013)	9	31	1	1	28	5	1	0	0	0	0	76
7 July 2014	10	25	2	0	27	5	1	1	1	1	3	76

== Membership ==
=== House of Representatives ===
All 150 seats in the lower house were contested in the election in September 2013.

Results for the House of Representatives in the 2013 election by division

== See also ==
- 45th Parliament of Australia
- Abbott government
