= Party whip (Australia) =

Position in an Australian political party

In the Parliament of Australia, the political parties appoint party whips to ensure party discipline, help manage legislative business and carry out a variety of other functions on behalf of the party leadership. Additional functions of the government party whips is to ensure that a sufficient number of government members and senators are present in the chamber to ensure passage of government legislation and measures and to prevent censure motions succeeding, and to ensure presence of a parliamentary quorum. Their roles in the chamber include tally votes during divisions, and arranging pairs which affects the ability of members and senators to leave parliament during sittings, as well as the entitlement to be absent during divisions.

Unlike in the United Kingdom, Australian whips do not hold official office, but they are recognised for parliamentary purposes. In practice, Australian whips play a lesser role than their counterparts in the United Kingdom, as party discipline in Australia tends to be tighter. The role of the whip becomes more critical the lower the majority the government has in the lower house of Parliament.

Liberal Party whips are appointed by the leader of the party, while Australian Labor Party whips are elected by the Caucus. For Labor and the Liberals, the chief whip is assisted by two deputy whips.

Similar arrangements exist in the six state and the two self-governing territory parliaments.

== Duties ==
Whips are essential to the day-to-day running of the house. They assist the party business managers (the Leader of the House, Manager of Opposition Business in the House, Manager of Government Business in the Senate, and Manager of Opposition Business in the Senate and their four deputies) arrange the order of business on the floor. They also draw up lists of speakers in debates, which (though not binding) assist the occupant of the chair in deciding whom to call on. The whips play the primary role in managing business in the parallel debating chamber (the Federation Chamber). The Government Chief Whip has the same power as ministers and parliamentary secretaries to move business motions. This right was extended with the creation of the parallel chamber (then called the Main Committee) to facilitate movement of business between it and the floor of the House of Representatives. The right can also be exercised by another whip acting on the Chief Whip's behalf.

Whips also play a central role in voting. During each vote (or "division"), whips ensure that their fellow party members are present and seated on the correct side of the house while votes are counted. Acting as tellers, the whips also count the votes. In a typical vote in the House of Representatives, where the Government and Opposition are on opposite sides, each will provide two tellers. One Government whip and one Opposition whip will count the votes in favour of the motion, and the other two will count the votes against. (Note: A House of Representatives source on the topic claims the appointment of two tellers is "the recent practice", but two tellers have been appointed from the first division on 5 June 1901 and in subsequent decades.) In the Senate, each side provides one whip.

== History ==
Whips have been a part of the Federal Parliament since its beginning with much the same function as today. Early in its first session in 1901, each of the three parliamentary parties elected one whip in the House of Representatives. Labor and the Free Trade Party each appointed a whip in the Senate as well. The Protectionist Party, which formed the government, did not appoint a whip because it did not require the confidence of the Senate to survive, though a whip was subsequently appointed for a brief period. (Note: John Keating was initially appointed to act for the ministry, not the party, solely during the pendency of the tariff bill. However, he seems to have acted as a more traditional whip by the press during that session. Keating continued as whip into the following session, though it is not clear whether the arrangement persisted when the Protectionists went into opposition in 1904. At the latest, Keating ceased to be whip upon becoming a minister in July 1905. No Government whip was appointed.)

While references to assistant or deputy whips in the Australian Parliament sometimes appeared in early press reporting, just when the concept of a deputy whip emerged, or how formal the position initially was, is unclear. For example, Alfred Conroy was described in a news report in 1903 as Labor's assistant whip, and when the Labor Whip Jim Page died in 1921, press reports stated that "the Deputy Whip", James Fenton, would act as whip until a new whip was elected. There is, however, no indication that he was elected to that position or that any Labor deputy whip was elected until Labor Whip Gil Duthie successfully lobbied for the official creation of the role in the 1960s.

The appointment of a second official whip in the House of Representatives appears to have begun with the Commonwealth Liberal Party, as its appointment of "joint Ministerial whips" in 1913 drew comment. Those appointments survived the party's fall from government and merger with National Labor to form the Nationalist Party. The practice continued until 1923, when the Nationalists and Country Party formed a coalition, at which point each party contributed one whip. Unlike later practice, the senior whip (also sometimes called "Chief Government Whip") was the one who had served longer as whip. By the 1950s, the Country Party whip was always junior.

It is unclear whether the practice continued when the parties went into opposition in 1929, but when the United Australia Party was formed from the Nationalists and some breakaway Labor MPs, a member of the latter group became deputy to James Bayley, who had been the Commonwealth Liberal whip. When the UAP and Country Party formed a new coalition following the 1931 election, they resumed the practice of each party appointing one of two Government whips.

The Liberal Party, formed in 1945, appointed Reginald Swartz as its first deputy whip in 1950, after the party had won government for the first time. This second Liberal whip was the "Assistant Government Whip", as opposed to the Country Party's whip, who was the "Deputy Government Whip". The Labor Party elected its first official deputy whip in the early 1960s. (Note: Labor Whip Gil Duthie stated in a debate in October 1968 that the Labor Party had elected its first deputy "four or five years ago", i.e. 1963 or 1964. The party's first Senate deputy whip was appointed in 1962, meaning a House of Representatives whip may have been elected at the same time, in which case Duthie's estimate of the length of time was mistaken.)

The first deputy whip in the Senate was Annabelle Rankin in 1950. She had served as the Liberal Party's whip during the three-year period beginning 1 July 1947, when there were two Liberals senators and one from the Country Party, (Note: Walter Cooper (Country) was Leader of the Opposition in the Senate, and Neil O'Sullivan (Liberal) was Deputy Leader.) In a somewhat controversial move, but she was replaced as whip by Reg Wright and made deputy when senators elected as part of the expansion of the Senate took their seats in February 1950. The next year, following the double dissolution and subsequent election, Wright stood down as whip, and Rankin was elected unopposed to succeed him. The post of deputy was left unfilled.

Labor elected its first deputy Senate whip in 1962. The Liberals followed suit in November 1974 Labor added a second deputy in August 1985, pointing out that its whipping operation would then match the Coalitions (which had a Liberal whip and deputy and a National Party whip). Liberal added a second whip in 2009, while in opposition.

The National Country Party, which as the Country Party had elected a whip in the House of Representatives since its early days, first elected a Senate whip in 1973 and a deputy whip for the House of Representatives in 1976. The latter, Peter Fisher MP, was subsequently elected National Country Whip in 1980, and it does not appear another deputy was elected until 1989, when the practice became standard. As of August 2013, the party does not elect a deputy whip in the Senate.

By 1994, all three major parties in the House of Representatives had a whip and a deputy whip, but only the National Party's deputy whip did not receive an additional salary. On 12 May 1994, Kim Beazley, then the Leader of the House, announced that, in conjunction with the creation of the second debating chamber, the Government Whip in the House of Representatives would become the Chief Government Whip, and his deputy would become the Government Whip. In addition, a second junior whip would be added. Beazley offered the same arrangement for the Liberal Party and to see that the Nationals' deputy received a salary. Labor elected its whip that day, and the Liberals appointed an additional whip on 2 June 1994, with the new whip responsible for business in the second chamber.

That arrangement persists today. Labor and the Liberals each have a chief whip and two whips in the House of Representatives and a chief whip and two deputy whips in the Senate. The Nationals have a chief whip and whip in the House and one whip in the Senate. In addition, the Greens have had a whip in the Senate since May 1995. Other parties have also had whips. When the Democratic Labor Party (now the Democratic Labour Party) increased from two to four senators in July 1968, it elected a whip who served until he and the rest of the DLP senators lost their seats at the 1974 double dissolution election. The Australian Democrats had a whip from 1981 until 2008, when all four senators left office following their loss at the 2007 election.

== Salary ==
Until 1952, whips were paid no salary apart from their pay as a parliamentarian. The Government whip, however, received payment from a pool each Cabinet minister paid into. The Parliamentary Allowances Act 1952 provided salaries for the whips of each recognised party in both the Senate and House of Representatives. Although the parties began appointing deputy whips in the 1950s and 1960s, they were not provided a salary until 1973.

When the Remuneration Tribunal was created, also in 1973, it was given control over parliamentary salaries and additional salaries for parliamentary officeholders, it retained salaries for the existing whips. In 1994, with the creation of the Main Committee (now the Federation Chamber), the Government effectively changed the names of the Government and Opposition Whips to "Chief Whip" and added one paid post of whip for each of the parties in the House of Representatives.

Currently, there are 14 paid whips in Parliament: Labor and the Liberals each have five paid whips, three in the House and two in the Senate; the Nationals have two whips in the House of Representatives and one in the Senate, and the Greens have a Senate whip. The Government and Opposition chief whips in the House of Representatives earn an additional salary equal to 26% and 23%, respectively, of their base pay as MPs. This is roughly equal to an assistant minister (until 2015 called a parliamentary secretary) (25%). Their counterparts in the Senate earn slightly less: 20% for the Government Chief Whip and 18% for the Opposition Chief Whip. Additional salaries for other whips range from 3% to 13% of base pay.

== See also ==
- List of whips in the Australian Senate
- List of whips in the Australian House of Representatives
- Leader of the Government in the Senate (Australia)
- Leader of the Opposition in the Senate (Australia)
