= Doug Cameron (politician) =

Australian politician (born 1951)

The Honourable Doug Cameron
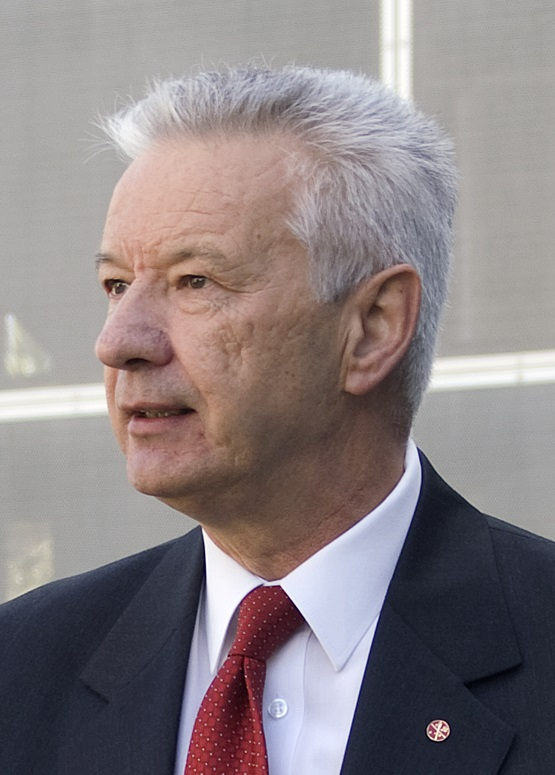

Senator for New South Wales
- In office 1 July 2008 – 30 June 2019

Personal details
- Born: Douglas Niven Cameron; 27 January 1951 (age 75) Bellshill, Scotland
- Party: Labor
- Occupation: Fitter

Douglas Niven Cameron (born 27 January 1951) is a retired Australian politician and trade unionist. He served as a Senator for New South Wales from 2008 to 2019, representing the Australian Labor Party (ALP).

== Early life ==
Cameron was born in Bellshill, Scotland, just outside Glasgow. His mother's parents were born in Lithuania. He left school at 15 to take up an apprenticeship as a fitter at a local chain-making factory. Shortly after completing his apprenticeship the factory closed, and Cameron emigrated to Australia in 1973, at the age of 22. He initially worked at the Garden Island Dockyard in Sydney, before moving to the Liddell Power Station in Muswellbrook in 1975, where he worked as a maintenance fitter.

== Union movement ==
After seven years working at the power station Cameron was elected as the Hunter Valley/New England regional organiser for the Amalgamated Metal Workers and Shipwrights Union (AMWSU). In 1986 he became the Assistant State Secretary of the union (by then known as the Amalgamated Metal Workers Union) in NSW, and later the Assistant National Secretary. Cameron served as National Secretary of the Australian Manufacturing Workers Union from 1996 to 2008.

== Politics ==
Cameron was first elected to the Senate at the 2007 federal election. He won Labor preselection by mounting a successful challenge to an incumbent senator, George Campbell, with the support of the Labor Left faction. In the Senate, he was known for his heavy Scottish accent.

During the period of leadership tensions between Julia Gillard and Kevin Rudd, Cameron was a vocal Rudd supporter. In the second Rudd ministry, which held office from June to September 2013, he served as Parliamentary Secretary for Housing and Homelessness.

In October 2013, Cameron was appointed Shadow Minister for Human Services in the Shadow Ministry of Bill Shorten. He was instead made Shadow Minister for Housing and Homelessness and Shadow Minister for Skills and Apprenticeships in July 2016.

Cameron announced on 24 July 2016 that he would retire at the end of his current term, and not contest the 2019 election.

In July 2022, Cameron and Nick Sherry were appointed by the Australian Labor Party National Executive as administrators of the Tasmanian branch, following the suspension of the state executive.
