= Sam Dastyari =

Australian former politician (born 1983)

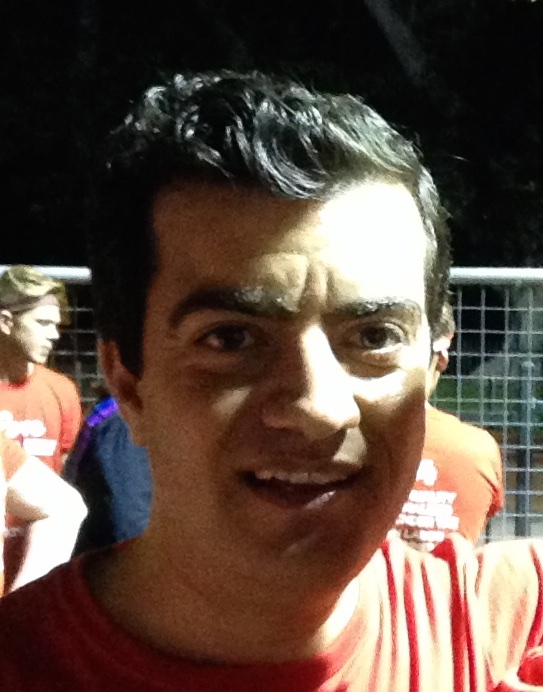
- Dastyari at the Sydney Mardi Gras in 2014

Senator for New South Wales
- In office 21 August 2013 – 25 January 2018
- Preceded by: Matt Thistlethwaite
- Succeeded by: Kristina Keneally

General Secretary of the New South Wales Labor Party
- In office 17 July 2010 – 21 August 2013
- Leader: Kristina Keneally; John Robertson
- Preceded by: Matt Thistlethwaite
- Succeeded by: Jamie Clements

Deputy Opposition Whip in the Senate
- In office 3 February 2017 – 30 November 2017
- Leader: Penny Wong
- Chief Whip: Anne Urquhart
- Preceded by: Catryna Bilyk

Manager of Opposition Business in the Senate
- In office 23 July 2016 – 7 September 2016
- Deputy: Katy Gallagher
- Leader: Penny Wong
- Preceded by: Claire Moore
- Succeeded by: Katy Gallagher

Personal details
- Born: Sahand Dastyari; 28 July 1983 (age 43) Sari, Mazandaran Province, Iran
- Party: Labor
- Spouse: Helen Barron (m. 2010)
- Children: 2
- Education: Baulkham Hills High School
- Alma mater: Macquarie University

Sam Dastyari (born 28 July 1983) is an Australian former politician, who from 2013 to 2018 represented New South Wales in the Australian Senate as a member of the Australian Labor Party. Dastyari was previously General Secretary of the New South Wales branch of the Labor Party. He was the first person of Iranian origin and Azerbaijani descent to sit in the Australian Parliament. As a Senator, Dastyari was the subject of a Chinese-related donations scandal, which eventually led to his resignation from the Senate on 25 January 2018.

== Early life and education ==
Born in Sari, Mazandaran Province, Iran to an ethnic Azerbaijani father and Mazanderani mother, Dastyari arrived in Australia at age four in January 1988. His parents were student activists in the 1979 Iranian revolution.

Dastyari attended John Purchase Public School in Cherrybrook, joined the Australian Labor Party at age sixteen and was vice-captain at Baulkham Hills High School. Dastyari dropped out of a Bachelor of Economics / Bachelor of Laws course at the University of Sydney due to being "so caught up in the movement and student politics". He went on to become President of Australian Young Labor and later studied part-time at Macquarie University, graduating with a Bachelor of Arts majoring in politics.

== Political career (2010–2018) ==
=== Early career (2010–2013) ===
In March 2010, Dastyari was elected as General Secretary of NSW Labor with the support of the Transport Workers' Union (TWU), the Electrical Trades Union (ETU), and the Australian Workers Union (AWU).

=== Australian Senate (2013–2018) ===
On 21 August 2013, a joint sitting of the Parliament of New South Wales appointed Dastyari to the Senate seat vacated by Matt Thistlethwaite, who had resigned to contest a House of Representatives seat at the 2013 federal election.

Dastyari was an Iranian citizen at birth. He previously applied to renounce Iranian citizenship in order to take the "reasonable steps" required to comply with section 44 of the Constitution of Australia. Dastyari did not complete the compulsory military service required to renounce citizenship under Iranian law, but stated that the Iranian government's issuance of a tourist visa to him acknowledged that he was no longer an Iranian citizen.

In October 2015, the retirements of Bernie Ripoll and Jan McLucas from the shadow ministry caused a reshuffle, and Dastyari became Deputy Manager of Opposition Business in the Senate, Shadow Parliamentary Secretary to the Leader of the Opposition, and Shadow Parliamentary Secretary for School Education and Youth.

After Labor's defeat at the 2016 election, Dastyari was promoted to the shadow outer ministry becoming Manager of Opposition Business in the Senate, and spokesman for consumer affairs. Dastyari resigned from the positions following a scandal over payments and gifts from Chinese companies. He was later appointed Deputy Opposition Whip in the Senate. Dastyari formally submitted his resignation from the Senate on 25 January 2018.

==== Chinese influence scandal ====
In November 2014, Dastyari declared that a Chinese company with links to the Chinese government had provided him with $44,000 to settle his legal bills. In October 2015, Dastyari asked a Chinese private education provider with links to the Chinese government to pay a travel bill of $1,670. He declared both payments appropriately.

Dastyari spoke at Chinese-language press conferences and was at odds with the Australian government's policy on the South China Sea. Malcolm Turnbull, then Prime Minister, accused him of accepting money in exchange for supporting China in its South China Sea territorial disputes. The uproar over Dastyari's actions was seen by The Economist as a sign of the changing mood among Australians regarding Chinese investment. Initially, Dastyari attempted to defuse the situation by offering the money he had received to a charity; however, the charity refused to accept the donation. As a result of this controversy, on 7 September 2016 Dastyari resigned from his shadow frontbench position as Manager of Opposition Business and spokesman for consumer affairs, and returned to the backbench.

In 2017, following reports that Dastyari contradicted Labor's policy on the South China Sea territorial dispute and offered counter-surveillance advice to the Chinese donor in question, Huang Xiangmo, he was removed from his roles as Senate Deputy Opposition Whip and Senate Committee chair. Media reports also stated that Dastyari had told the donor, Huang Xiangmo, that his phones were likely being tapped by intelligence agencies and that they should leave their phones inside and speak outside to avoid being overheard. Party leader Bill Shorten stripped Dastyari of his role as Deputy Opposition Whip the next day, amid calls from Prime Minister Turnbull and the Government for Dastyari to stand down from the Senate. In December 2017, reports emerged that in 2015 he attempted to persuade Labor's foreign affairs spokesperson, Tanya Plibersek, to cancel a meeting with a member of Hong Kong's pro-democracy camp.

On 12 December 2017, Dastyari announced that he would resign from the Senate prior to the 2018 parliamentary year. His decision not to resign with immediate effect attracted some criticism, partly because it would allow him to continue earning a Senator's salary. He formally submitted his resignation to the President of the Senate on 25 January 2018.

Ross Babbage, former head of strategic analysis at the Office of National Assessments, described Dastyari as an "agent of influence" and part of China's aim to build local support for its policy positions around the world. As a result of the scandal, Dastyari was the subject of petitions with thousands of signatures calling for him to be charged with treason.

Post his political career, in 2019 Dastyari appeared before the NSW Independent Commission Against Corruption public inquiry into allegations concerning political donations, the NSW Branch of the Australian Labor Party (ALP), members of Chinese Friends of Labor and others. Dastyari testified that in September 2016 he provided advice to Kaila Murnain, at the time an Assistant Secretary of NSW Labor, to seek the advice of Labor's lawyers following disclosure that NSW Labor received potentially unlawful donations in 2015 and potential fundraising misconduct.

=== Domestic policies ===
==== Banking royal commission ====
In 2014, Dastyari called for a royal commission into the banking and financial services sector. A number of scandals involving some companies increased pressure on the Federal Government to establish a royal commission with Labor promising to establish a royal commission should it win the 2016 federal election.

As Chair of the Senate Economics Committee, Dastyari instigated the inquiries into financial practices, and led questioning of the big four banks regarding a string of financial advice scandals. He continued to push for a more substantial royal commission and vigorously pursued the banks when in office. He worked with Senate crossbenchers in 2017 to establish a powerful Parliamentary Commission of Inquiry into Australia's big banks, putting more pressure on the Federal Government to establish a royal commission. The Royal Commission into Misconduct in the Banking, Superannuation and Financial Services Industry was established in December 2017 after years of public pressure.

==== Multinational tax avoidance ====
On the issue of multinational tax avoidance, Dastyari led an inquiry in 2015 to examine whether some companies were running an international tax avoidance structure. He called for the Federal Government to do more to counter corporate tax avoidance. Dastyari made a video starring his kids to explain tax avoidance using the currency of lollies.

=== Political views ===
In 2012, at a dinner to promote multiculturalism and "bring Muslims and others together to learn and understand each other's culture and religious significance", Dastyari said "Labor core values are similar to Islamic social value such as equal justice and respect for everyone".

In 2016, Dastyari claimed that ten companies wield the most incredible amount of power in Australia to an extent that stifles proper democratic and economic progress.

== Post-politics career ==
In March 2018, Dastyari passed a two-show trial to join a KIIS 106.5 Sydney breakfast radio show once a fortnight on a segment known as Gutter Politics. In November 2018, Dastyari replaced Overnight talk show host Luke Bona on Triple M for two weeks.

Dastyari participated in the fifth season of reality program I'm a Celebrity...Get Me Out of Here!

== Personal life ==
Dastyari identifies as a "non-practising Muslim". He and wife Helen lived in the Sydney suburb of Russell Lea with their two daughters. In January 2019 he announced that he and his wife had separated.

Dastyari is a member of the "Halal Snack Pack Appreciation Society" Facebook Group although he has publicly stated that "some halal certifiers are nothing more than scammers". He made news by inviting One Nation's leader Pauline Hanson to join him for a Halal Snack Pack, an invitation she declined.

== Published works ==
- Dastyari, Sam (2017). One halal of a story. Melbourne University Press an imprint of Melbourne University Publishing Limited. ISBN 978-0-522-87208-8.

Parliament of Australia
Political offices
Preceded by Claire Moore	Manager of Opposition Business in the Senate; 2016–2016	Succeeded by Katy Gallagher
Party political offices
Preceded by Matt Thistlethwaite	General Secretary of the NSW Labor Party; 2010–2013	Succeeded by Jamie Clements
