= Matt Thistlethwaite =

Australian politician (born 1972)

The Honourable Matt Thistlethwaite MP
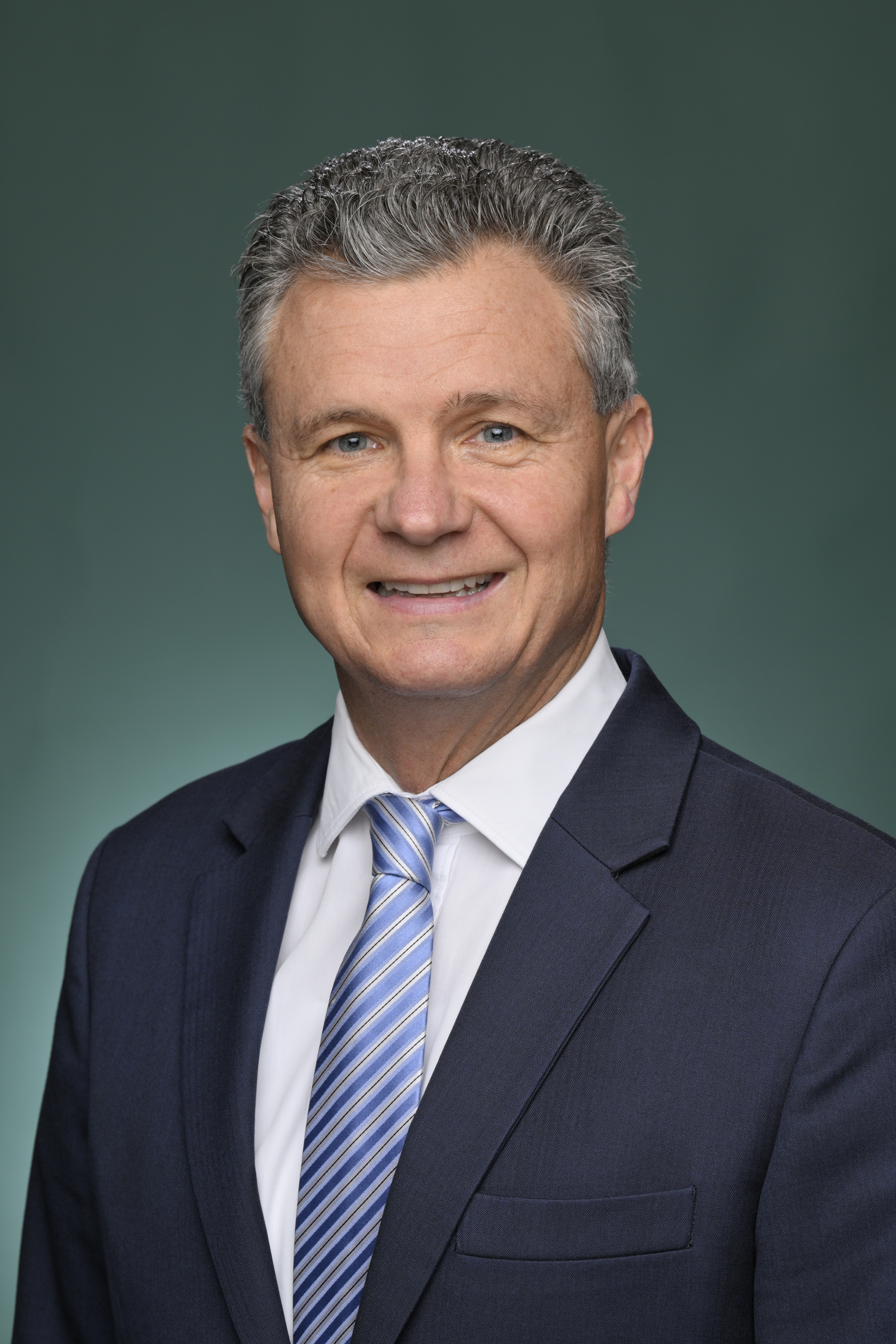
- Official portrait, 2025

Assistant Minister for Immigration
- Incumbent
- Assumed office 29 July 2024
- Prime Minister: Anthony Albanese
- Minister: Tony Burke (Minister for Immigration and Citizenship)

Assistant Minister for Foreign Affairs and Trade
- Incumbent
- Assumed office 13 May 2025
- Prime Minister: Anthony Albanese
- Minister: Penny Wong (Minister for Foreign Affairs); Don Farrell (Minister for Trade and Tourism)
- Preceded by: Tim Watts (as Assistant Minister for Foreign Affairs); Tim Ayres (as Assistant Minister for Trade)

Assistant Minister for Defence Assistant Minister for Veterans' Affairs Assistant Minister for the Republic
- In office 1 June 2022 – 29 July 2024
- Minister: Richard Marles (Minister for Defence); Matt Keogh (Minister for Veterans' Affairs); Mark Dreyfus (Attorney General)
- Preceded by: Andrew Hastie (as Assistant Minister for Defence); Amanda Stoker (as Assistant Minister to the Attorney-General)
- Succeeded by: Peter Khalil (as Assistant Minister for Defence); Patrick Gorman (as Assistant Minister to the Attorney-General)

Member of the Australian Parliament for Kingsford Smith
- Incumbent
- Assumed office 7 September 2013
- Preceded by: Peter Garrett

Senator for New South Wales
- In office 1 July 2011 – 9 August 2013
- Succeeded by: Sam Dastyari

General Secretary of the New South Wales Labor Party
- In office 1 October 2008 – 17 July 2010
- Leader: Morris Iemma; Nathan Rees; Kristina Keneally
- Preceded by: Karl Bitar
- Succeeded by: Sam Dastyari

Personal details
- Born: Matthew James Thistlethwaite; 6 September 1972 (age 54) Maroubra, New South Wales, Australia
- Citizenship: Australia
- Party: Labor
- Spouse: Rachel
- Children: 4
- Education: Marist College Pagewood
- Alma mater: University of New South Wales
- Occupation: Legal advisor (Mallesons Stephen Jaques); Union organiser (Australian Workers' Union)
- Profession: Trade unionist solicitor politician
- Website: mattthistlethwaite.com.au

Matthew James Thistlethwaite (born 6 September 1972) is an Australian politician. He has been an Australian Labor Party member of the Australian House of Representatives since 2013, representing the electorate of Kingsford Smith. Since 29 July 2024, Thistlethwaite has served as the Assistant Minister for Immigration in the ministry of Anthony Albanese. He has also served as the Assistant Minister for Foreign Affairs and Trade since May 2025.

Thistlethwaite is a senior figure in the Labor Right faction and stands as the current convenor of the NSW branch. Before joining Parliament, he was the general secretary of the New South Wales branch of the Australian Labor Party. He served as a member of the Australian Senate from 2011 to 2013.

From 1 June 2022 to 29 July 2024, Thistlethwaite served as Assistant Minister for Defence, Veterans' Affairs and the Republic.

== Early life ==
Thistlethwaite was born in Sydney on 6 September 1972. He grew up in the suburb of Maroubra in a Catholic family. His father was a Qantas steward. He is the eldest of three siblings.

He graduated from the University of New South Wales with a Bachelor of Economics, and also holds diplomas in law and legal practice from the University of Technology Sydney. He was the first member of his family to attend university.

== Career ==
In 1995, Thistlethwaite began working at the Australian Workers Union as an industrial officer. In 2001 he was elected as a state vice-president of the union. He joined the ALP at the age of 22 and was president of NSW Young Labor from 1997 to 1998.

Thistlethwaite was involved in the Australian republic referendum in 1999, and was the campaign manager for the Australian Republican Movement in his electorate of Kingsford Smith.

From 2001 to 2008 he was Chair of the Australian Labor Party Law Reform Committee. From 2004 to 2008 he was Charity of the Australian Labor Party Review Tribunal.

In 2004, Thistlethwaite was elected Deputy Secretary of Unions NSW. In this role he represented workers in public sector enterprise agreement negotiations and in the NSW Industrial Relations Commission. He was a co-ordinator of the Your Rights at Work campaign in New South Wales against the Howard Government's WorkChoices laws.

Thistlethwaite is a former director of the State Transit Authority of NSW and the NSW Manufacturing Council.

Before entering Parliament, Thistlethwaite worked as a senior consultant with law firm Mallesons Stephen Jaques.

== Political career ==
Thistlethwaite sought to become the endorsed Labor candidate for the House of Representatives seat of Kingsford Smith in Sydney's eastern suburbs, for the 2004 election. However, Peter Garrett was chosen by the then Labor leader Mark Latham. Thistlethwaite worked as Garrett's campaign adviser.

He was elected general secretary of NSW Labor from 2008 to 2010. During his time as NSW ALP secretary Thistlethwaite backed Frank Sartor's unsuccessful candidacy to replace premier Nathan Rees and Rees was instead replaced by Kristina Keneally.

=== Senate ===
He was endorsed for a seat in the Senate, representing New South Wales, at the 2010 election. He was successful, and his term began on 1 July 2011. On 18 July 2011 he gave his first speech in the Senate. Soon after his term began, Thistlethwaite was appointed to serve on five Parliamentary Committees. In August 2012, Thistlethwaite became Chair of the Senate Select Committee on Electricity Prices. He served as Parliamentary Secretary for Pacific Island Affairs and Parliamentary Secretary for Multicultural Affairs in the Gillard government from March to July 2013, and as Parliamentary Secretary for Infrastructure and Transport in the Rudd government from July to September 2013.

Following the announcement by Peter Garrett that he would not recontest the seat of Kingsford Smith at the next federal election, Thistlethwaite announced on 2 July 2013 that he would again seek Labor preselection; and gained endorsement on 20 July 2013, defeating Tony Bowen, the mayor of Randwick and son of former Kingsford Smith MP Lionel Bowen.

Thistlethwaite was elected as the member for Kingsford Smith at the election held on 7 September 2013. He was one of three people to move from the Senate to the House of Representatives at that election (the others were his ALP colleague David Feeney in Batman and former Nationals Senate leader Barnaby Joyce in New England).

=== Opposition ===
From 18 October 2013 to 23 July 2016, Thistlethwaite served as Shadow Parliamentary Secretary for Foreign Affairs and Immigration.

From 23 July 2016 to 2 June 2019 he served as Shadow Assistant Minister for Treasury.

In 2017 the Australian Labor Party announced a national vote on the republic during the first term of a future Labor government, and appointed Matt Thistlethwaite as the first 'Shadow Assistant Minister for an Australian Head of State'.

From 2 June 2019 to 28 January 2021 he served as Shadow Assistant Minister for Financial Services.

In 2020, he was elected to replace Joel Fitzgibbon as the Labor Right convenor within the ALP. The Australian reported that "by becoming the NSW factional boss, Thistlethwaite de facto takes the title of national Right convener".

From 28 January 2021 to 23 May 2022 he served as Shadow Assistant Minister for Financial Services and Superannuation.

=== Assistant minister ===
On 1 June 2022, Thistlethwaite was appointed Assistant Minister for Defence, Assistant Minister for Veterans' Affairs, and Assistant Minister for the Republic in the Albanese ministry. A freedom of information request revealed that as of October 2023, only two documents had been produced and one meeting held in relation to Thistlethwaite's portfolio as Assistant Minister for the Republic. Thistlethwaite had not delivered any speeches, press releases, or ministerial statements.

On 29 July 2024, as part of the Albanese Government's first ministry reshuffle, Thistlethwaite was made Assistant Minister for Immigration. The role of Assistant Minister for the Republic is no longer held by anyone in the Albanese Government.

After the re-election of the Labor government in the 2025 Australian federal election, Thistlethwaite remained as Assistant Minister for Immigration, while also appointed as Assistant Minister for Foreign Affairs and Trade.

Thistlethwaite has ambitions of becoming a cabinet minister in the future.

== Personal life ==
Thistlethwaite lives in Matraville with his wife Rachel, a nurse, and their four daughters Amelie, Scarlett, and twins Eliza and Camilla.

He has been an active surf lifesaver for over 30 years. He was signed up as a member of the Maroubra surf club at the age of 13 by his father. He has served as the president of the Maroubra Surf Life Saving Club for four years.

Thistlethwaite met former Premier of New South Wales and State Member for Maroubra, Bob Carr through the Maroubra Surf Life Saving Club. He has described Carr as a mentor.

Party political offices
Preceded by Karl Bitar	General Secretary of the New South Wales Labor Party; 2008–2010	Succeeded by Sam Dastyari
Parliament of Australia
Preceded by Michael Forshaw	Senator for New South Wales; 2011–2013	Succeeded by Sam Dastyari
Preceded by Peter Garrett	Member for Kingsford Smith; 2013–present	Incumbent
Political offices
Preceded by Richard Marles	Parliamentary Secretary for Pacific Island Affairs; 2013	Vacant Title next held by Steven Ciobo as Minister for International Development and the Pacific
Preceded by Kate Lundy	Parliamentary Secretary for Multicultural Affairs; 2013	Vacant Title next held by Concetta Fierravanti-Wells as Assistant Minister for Multicultural Affairs
Preceded by Catherine King	Parliamentary Secretary for Infrastructure and Transport; 2013	Succeeded by Jamie Briggs as Assistant Minister for Infrastructure and Regional Development
Preceded by Andrew Hastie	Assistant Minister for Defence; 2022–2024	Vacant
New title	Assistant Minister for Veterans' Affairs; 2022–2024	Vacant
New title	Assistant Minister for the Republic; 2022–2024	Vacant
Vacant	Assistant Minister for Immigration; 2024–present	Incumbent
