= Manager of Opposition Business in the House (Australia) =

Opposition post in the Parliament of Australia

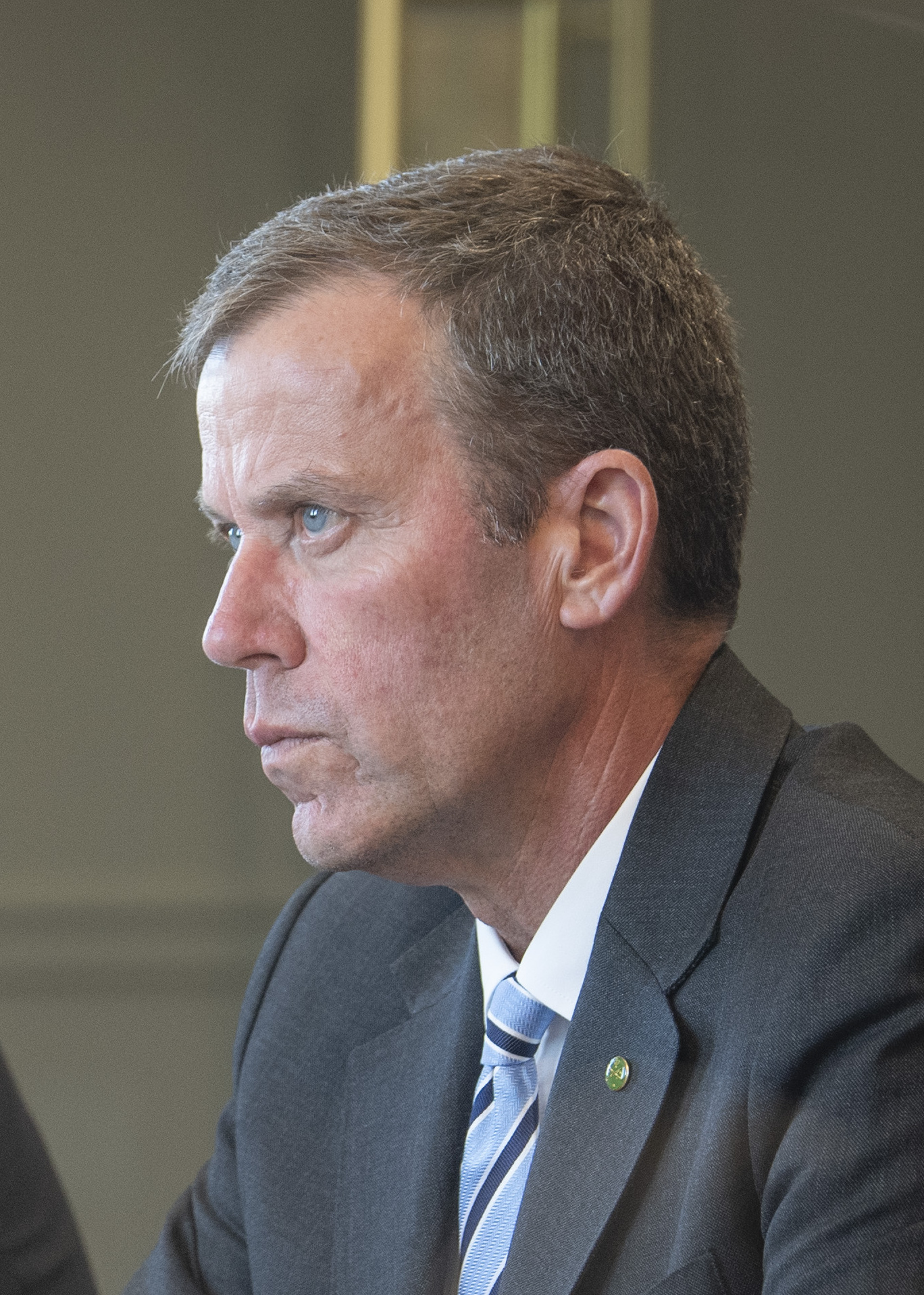
- Incumbent; Dan Tehan since 17 February 2026
- Appointer: Leader of the Opposition

The Manager of Opposition Business in the House, sometimes called Opposition Leader of the House, is the member of the Australian Official Opposition Shadow Ministry responsible for negotiating with the Leader of the House regarding proceedings in the Australian House of Representatives. Among other things, the topics of negotiation are the order in which Government bills and other items of business are taken, the time allotted for debate, and the timing of Opposition business.

The Manager of Opposition Business in the House and the Deputy Manager are appointed by the Opposition leader. The duties of the Deputy Manager of Opposition Business are largely contingent, coming into play only when the Manager of Opposition Business is absent from the House or is on leave. When this happens, the deputy is referred to as Acting Manager of Opposition Business.

Three managers of Opposition Business in the House, John Howard, Julia Gillard, and Anthony Albanese, went on to become Prime Ministers.

Another future Prime Minister and former leader of the house, Tony Abbott stepped in as Acting Manager in 2009 in the absence of Christopher Pyne.

== List ==
The Managers of Opposition Business since 1974 are as follows:

Order	Manager	Party	Leader of the Opposition	Term start	Term end	Term in office
1	Ian Sinclair	National Country	Billy Snedden	14 June 1974	21 March 1975	1 year, 150 days
1	Ian Sinclair	National Country	Malcolm Fraser	21 March 1975	11 November 1975	1 year, 150 days
2	Gordon Scholes	Labor	Gough Whitlam	27 January 1976	22 December 1977	1 year, 336 days
2	Gordon Scholes	Labor	Bill Hayden	22 December 1977	29 December 1977	1 year, 336 days
3	Mick Young	Labor	Bill Hayden	29 December 1977	11 February 1980	2 years, 44 days
4	Chris Hurford	Labor	Bill Hayden	11 February 1980	7 November 1980	270 days
5	Lionel Bowen	Labor	Bill Hayden	10 November 1980	3 February 1983	2 years, 121 days
5	Lionel Bowen	Labor	Bob Hawke	3 February 1983	11 March 1983	2 years, 121 days
(1)	Ian Sinclair	National	Andrew Peacock	16 March 1983	5 September 1985	4 years, 43 days
(1)	Ian Sinclair	National	John Howard	5 September 1985	28 April 1987	4 years, 43 days
6	John Spender	Liberal	John Howard	29 April 1987	14 August 1987	107 days
7	Wal Fife	Liberal	John Howard	14 August 1987	9 May 1989	4 years, 283 days
7	Wal Fife	Liberal	Andrew Peacock	9 May 1989	3 April 1990	4 years, 283 days
7	Wal Fife	Liberal	John Hewson	3 April 1990	23 May 1992	4 years, 283 days
8	Warwick Smith	Liberal	John Hewson	23 May 1992	8 February 1993	261 days
9	John Howard	Liberal	John Hewson	7 April 1993	23 May 1994	1 year, 298 days
9	John Howard	Liberal	Alexander Downer	23 May 1994	30 January 1995	1 year, 298 days
10	Peter Reith	Liberal	John Howard	31 January 1995	11 March 1996	1 year, 40 days
11	Simon Crean	Labor	Kim Beazley	20 March 1996	20 October 1998	2 years, 214 days
12	Bob McMullan	Labor	Kim Beazley	20 October 1998	25 November 2001	3 years, 36 days
13	Wayne Swan	Labor	Simon Crean	25 November 2001	16 June 2003	1 year, 203 days
14	Mark Latham	Labor	Simon Crean	16 June 2003	8 December 2003	165 days
15	Julia Gillard	Labor	Mark Latham	8 December 2003	18 January 2005	3 years, 2 days
15	Julia Gillard	Labor	Kim Beazley	18 January 2005	10 December 2006	3 years, 2 days
16	Anthony Albanese	Labor	Kevin Rudd	10 December 2006	3 December 2007	358 days
17	Joe Hockey	Liberal	Brendan Nelson	2 December 2007	16 September 2008	1 year, 76 days
17	Joe Hockey	Liberal	Malcolm Turnbull	16 September 2008	16 February 2009	1 year, 76 days
18	Christopher Pyne	Liberal	Malcolm Turnbull	16 February 2009	1 December 2009	4 years, 214 days
18	Christopher Pyne	Liberal	Tony Abbott	1 December 2009	18 September 2013	4 years, 214 days
19	Tony Burke	Labor	Bill Shorten	18 October 2013	30 May 2019	8 years, 217 days
19	Tony Burke	Labor	Anthony Albanese	30 May 2019	23 May 2022	8 years, 217 days
20	Paul Fletcher	Liberal	Peter Dutton	5 June 2022	25 January 2025	2 years, 234 days
21	Michael Sukkar	Liberal	Peter Dutton	25 January 2025	3 May 2025	98 days
22	Alex Hawke	Liberal	Sussan Ley	28 May 2025	17 February 2026	265 days
23	Dan Tehan	Liberal	Angus Taylor	17 February 2026	present	202 days

== Deputy Manager of Opposition Business ==
Deputy Managers of Opposition Business are as follows:

Order	Manager	Party	Leader of the Opposition	Term start	Term end	Term in office
1	Julia Gillard	Labor	Simon Crean	2 July 2003	8 December 2003	159 days
2	Simon Crean	Labor	Mark Latham	8 December 2003	26 October 2004	323 days
3	Anthony Albanese	Labor	Mark Latham	26 October 2004	18 January 2005	2 years, 45 days
3	Anthony Albanese	Labor	Kim Beazley	18 January 2005	10 December 2006	2 years, 45 days
4	Kelvin Thomson	Labor	Kevin Rudd	10 December 2006	9 March 2007	89 days
5	Bob McMullan	Labor	Kevin Rudd	9 March 2007	3 December 2007	269 days
6	Luke Hartsuyker	National	Brendan Nelson	6 December 2007	16 September 2008	5 years, 286 days
6	Luke Hartsuyker	National	Malcolm Turnbull	16 September 2008	1 December 2009	5 years, 286 days
6	Luke Hartsuyker	National	Tony Abbott	1 December 2009	18 September 2013	5 years, 286 days
7	Mark Dreyfus	Labor	Bill Shorten	18 October 2013	2 June 2019	5 years, 227 days
8	Mark Butler	Labor	Anthony Albanese	2 June 2019	23 May 2022	2 years, 355 days
9	Kevin Hogan	National	Sussan Ley	5 June 2022	21 January 2026	3 years, 230 days
(9)	Kevin Hogan	National	Angus Taylor	17 February 2026	Incumbent	202 days

== See also ==
- Leader of the House (Australia)
- Manager of Opposition Business in the Senate
- Manager of Government Business in the Senate
