= Manager of Opposition Business in the Senate =

Australian parliamentary position

The Manager of Opposition Business in the Senate is the member of the Australian Official Opposition Shadow Ministry responsible for negotiating with the Manager of Government Business in the Senate regarding proceedings in the Australian Senate. Among other things, the topics of negotiation are the order in which Government bills and other items of business are taken, the time allotted for debate, and the timing of Opposition business.

The current Manager of Opposition Business is Jonathon Duniam, since January 2025.

== List ==
Manager	Term began	Term ended	Party	Leader of the Opposition
Doug McClelland	27 January 1976	22 December 1977	Labor	Gough Whitlam
None	22 December 1977	7 November 1980	Labor	Bill Hayden
Don Grimes	7 November 1980	5 March 1983	Labor	Bill Hayden
Don Grimes	7 November 1980	5 March 1983	Labor	Bob Hawke
None	11 March 1983	11 April 1990		Andrew Peacock
None	11 March 1983	11 April 1990		John Howard
None	11 March 1983	11 April 1990		Andrew Peacock
Chris Puplick	11 April 1990	30 June 1990	Liberal	John Hewson
None	30 June 1990	11 March 1996		John Hewson
None	30 June 1990	11 March 1996		Alexander Downer
None	30 June 1990	11 March 1996		John Howard
Kim Carr	20 March 1996	25 November 2001	Labor	Kim Beazley
Joe Ludwig	25 November 2001	3 December 2007	Labor	Simon Crean
Joe Ludwig	25 November 2001	3 December 2007	Labor	Mark Latham
Joe Ludwig	25 November 2001	3 December 2007	Labor	Kim Beazley
Joe Ludwig	25 November 2001	3 December 2007	Labor	Kevin Rudd
Chris Ellison	6 December 2007	22 September 2008	Liberal	Brendan Nelson
Helen Coonan	22 September 2008	16 February 2009	Liberal	Malcolm Turnbull
Stephen Parry	16 February 2009	14 September 2010	Liberal	Malcolm Turnbull
Stephen Parry	16 February 2009	14 September 2010	Liberal	Tony Abbott
Mitch Fifield	14 September 2010	18 September 2013	Liberal	Tony Abbott
Claire Moore	18 October 2013	23 July 2016	Labor	Bill Shorten
Sam Dastyari	23 July 2016	7 September 2016	Labor	Bill Shorten
Katy Gallagher	12 September 2016	6 December 2017	Labor	Bill Shorten
Jacinta Collins	6 December 2017	15 February 2019	Labor	Bill Shorten
Katy Gallagher	2 June 2019	23 May 2022	Labor	Anthony Albanese
Anne Ruston	5 June 2022	25 January 2025	Liberal	Peter Dutton
Jonathan Duniam	25 January 2025	Incumbent	Liberal	Peter Dutton
Jonathan Duniam	25 January 2025	Incumbent	Liberal	Sussan Ley
Jonathan Duniam	25 January 2025	Incumbent	Liberal	Angus Taylor

== See also ==
- Manager of Opposition Business in the House (Australia)
- Manager of Government Business in the Senate
- Leader of the Opposition in the Senate (Australia)
