= Claire Moore (politician) =

Australian politician

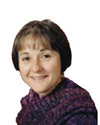

Manager of Opposition Business in the Senate
- In office 18 October 2013 – 23 July 2016
- Leader: Penny Wong
- Preceded by: Mitch Fifield
- Succeeded by: Sam Dastyari

Senator for Queensland
- In office 1 July 2002 – 30 June 2019

Personal details
- Born: Claire Mary Moore; 1956 (age 69–70) Toowoomba, Queensland, Australia
- Party: Australian Labor Party
- Parents: Mick Moore (father); Mary Moore (mother)
- Occupation: Trade unionist Public servant
- Website: Official website

Senator Moore addressing the 2014 March in May rally in Brisbane. Video: Patrick Gillett

Claire Mary Moore (born 1956) is an Australian politician who was an Australian Labor Party Senator for Queensland from 2002 to 2019, having been elected in the 2001 Federal Election, and the Shadow Minister for International Development and the Pacific. Prior to entering Parliament, Moore was the Queensland Secretary of the Community and Public Sector Union from 1994 to 2001 and a public servant. Senator Moore has previously served as Shadow Minister for Women, Shadow Minister for Carers, Shadow Minister for Communities, and the Manager of Opposition Business in the Senate.

== Early years and education ==
Clare Mary Moore was born in 1956 in Toowoomba, Queensland, to Catholic parents Mick and Mary Moore.

She attended St Saviour's College, prior to studying at both the University of Queensland and the University of Southern Queensland.

== Career ==
=== Union ===
Moore worked as a public servant in the Department of Aboriginal Affairs and the Department of Social Security (now Centrelink) between 1980 and 1994.

Moore was elected Branch Secretary of the Community and Public Sector Union (CPSU) in 1994: a position she held until her election to the Senate in 2001.

From 1996 to 2001, Moore was vice-president, Chair of the Women's Committee and Chair of the Arts Committee of the Queensland Council of Unions (QCU).

She is also a keen member and supporter of APHEDA: the trade union overseas aid program.

=== Australian Senate ===
Moore was elected Senator for Queensland at the Federal Election held on 10 November 2001, representing the Australian Labor Party (ALP). Her first six-year term began on 1 July 2002.

She was re-elected to a second term at the Federal Election held on 24 November 2007; and to a third term (which commenced on 1 July 2014) at the Federal Election held on 7 September 2013.

In the Senate, she has served as Chair or Deputy Chair of the Community Affairs Committee since July 2005, including both Chair of the Community Affairs (Legislation) Committee and Deputy Chair of the Community Affairs (References) Committee.

Moore has also served as a Member of the Joint Standing Committee on Foreign Affairs, Defence and Trade; as a Member of the Senate Standing Committee on Regulations and Ordinances; and as the Chair of the Parliamentary Group on Population and Development.

In July 2018 Moore announced that she would retire at the next election.

=== Shadow Minister ===
On Friday 18 October 2013, The Hon Bill Shorten MP, Leader of the Opposition, announced the allocation of portfolios in which Moore was appointed Shadow Minister for Women, Shadow Minister for Carers, Shadow Minister for Communities, and Manager of Opposition Business in the Senate.

Following Labor's narrow defeat at the 2016 election, Moore lost the Manager of Opposition Business role to Sam Dastyari but remained in the outer ministry becoming the Shadow Minister for International Development and the Pacific.

== Community memberships ==
Moore has been involved in many community organisations, including Australians for Native Title and Reconciliation (ANTaR), the Australian Republican Movement (ARM), Friends of the ABC, EMILY's List, and the Australian Workers' Heritage Centre, the last two of which she was a founding member. Moore was an executive member of the Australia Palestine Advocacy Network in the early 2020s.

Political offices
Vacant Title last held by Mitch Fifield	Manager of Opposition Business in the Senate; 2013–2016	Succeeded by Sam Dastyari
