= List of political controversies in Australia =

This is a list of major political controversies in Australia:

== Pre-federation ==
Controversy "name"	Date	State	People involved	Summary	Source
Rum Rebellion	1808	NSW	Deposition and arrest of NSW Governor William Bligh by Major George Johnston, John Macarthur		

== Federal controversies ==
=== Barton government ===
Controversy "name"	Date	Parties involved	People involved	Summary	Source
Hopetoun Blunder	1900	n/a	Lord Hopetoun; William Lyne; Edmund Barton	Lyne was chosen by Hopetoun to form Australia's first government, but leading politicians refused to serve under him and Barton was chosen instead.	

=== Deakin government ===
Controversy "name"	Date	Parties involved	People involved	Summary	Source
Petriana affair	1903	Government: Protectionist	Alfred Deakin; James Drake	Citing the White Australia policy, the government refused permission for shipwrecked sailors of Asian origin to land in Australia.	

=== Hughes government ===
Controversy "name"	Date	Parties involved	People involved	Summary	Source
ALP split of 1916	1916	Government: ALP	Billy Hughes	The ALP split over the issue of overseas conscription and the conscription referendum. Hughes and his supporters were expelled from the ALP and formed a separate National Labor Party.	
–	1916–1918	Government: ALP/Nationalist	Jens Jensen; James Long; Archibald Shaw	A 1918 royal commission found that Long had accepted a bribe from Shaw in 1916 and that Jensen had not secured proper approvals for the purchase of assets from Shaw's company. Long resigned from the Senate and Jensen was dismissed from the ministry.	
McDougall incident	1919	Opposition: ALP	John Keith McDougall	During the 1919 federal election campaign, McDougall was kidnapped and publicly tarred and feathered by return soldiers.	

=== Bruce–Page government ===
Controversy "name"	Date	Parties involved	People involved	Summary	Source
Walsh–Johnson case	1925	Government: Nationalist	Tom Walsh; Jacob Johnson; Littleton Groom	The government unsuccessfully sought to deport Walsh and Johnson, foreign-born leaders of the militant Seamen's Union. Groom resigned as Attorney-General.	
	1927	Opposition: ALP	William Mahony; Ted Theodore	A 1928 royal commission concluded Mahony had taken a bribe to resign his seat in parliament, allowing Theodore to enter the House of Representatives at the subsequent by-election.	

=== Scullin government ===
Controversy "name"	Date	Parties involved	People involved	Summary	Source
ALP split of 1931	1931	Government: ALP	James Scullin; Joseph Lyons; Jack Lang	The ALP split three ways over the Scullin government's response to the Great Depression, with Lyons and his followers joining the opposition and Lang's supporters joining the crossbench. Both eventually voted down the government forcing the 1931 federal election.	

=== Lyons government ===
Controversy "name"	Date	Parties involved	People involved	Summary	Source
Kisch case	1934	Government: UAP; Opposition: ALP	Egon Kisch; Joseph Lyons; Robert Menzies; Herbert Evatt	The government failed to stop a member of the German Communist Party from entering Australia.	
Freer case	1936	Government: UAP/Country	Mabel Freer; Thomas Paterson	The government refused entry to Freer on the grounds of immoral conduct. Paterson's perceived bungling of the case effectively ended his ministerial career.	
	1938	Government: UAP	Alexander McLachlan	McLachlan resigned as Postmaster-General following revelations of a conflict of interest with his business affairs.	
Dalfram dispute	1938–1939	Government: UAP	Robert Menzies	Attorney-General Menzies intervened to force striking waterside workers to load pig iron on a ship bound to Japan.	

=== Menzies government (I) ===
Controversy "name"	Date	Parties involved	People involved	Summary	Source
	1940	Government: UAP	John Lawson	Lawson resigned as Minister for Trade and Customs following revelations of a conflict of interest.	

=== Curtin government ===
Controversy "name"	Date	Parties involved	People involved	Summary	Source
"Brisbane Line" affair	1942–1943	Government: ALP	Eddie Ward	A royal commission found Ward had made unsubstantiated claims about the previous government's war strategy. He remained in the ministry but was demoted to lesser portfolios.	
"Australia First" affair	1942–1945	Government: ALP	H. V. Evatt; Frank Forde; P. R. Stephensen; Adela Walsh	Members of the far-right Australia First Movement were interned without trial for national security reasons. A post-war inquiry found they had been illegally detained and recommended compensation be awarded.	

=== Chifley government ===
Controversy "name"	Date	Parties involved	People involved	Summary	Source
Bank nationalisation	1947–1949	Government: ALP; Opposition: Liberal	Ben Chifley; H. V. Evatt; Robert Menzies	The government legislated in 1947 to take the private banks into public ownership. The High Court held the central provisions invalid in August 1948 as an infringement of section 92 of the Constitution, and the Privy Council dismissed the Commonwealth's appeal in 1949. The campaign against the legislation was a significant factor in Labor's defeat at the 1949 election.	
New Guinea timber affair	1948–1949	Government: ALP	Jock Garden; Eddie Ward	Garden was convicted of forging Ward's signature on documents to defraud investors in timber plantations. Ward was cleared of involvement by a subsequent royal commission, during which time he stood down as a minister.	
Gamboa case	1949	Government: ALP	Arthur Calwell; Lorenzo Gamboa	Calwell as immigration minister refused entry to Gamboa, a Filipino-American, under the White Australia policy, despite Gamboa having an Australian wife and children.	
New South Wales coal strike	1949	Government: ALP	Ben Chifley	The government sent in troops as strike-breakers following an illegal strike by the Australian Coal and Shale Employees' Federation.	

=== Menzies government (II) ===
Controversy "name"	Date	Parties involved	People involved	Summary	Source
Communist Party Dissolution Act and referendum	1950–1951	Government: Liberal/Country; Opposition: ALP	Robert Menzies; H. V. Evatt	The Communist Party Dissolution Act 1950 would have dissolved the Communist Party of Australia and empowered the Governor-General to declare individuals and organisations to be communist, with the onus of disproof on those declared. The High Court held the Act invalid by six to one in March 1951. Menzies then sought the same power by referendum, which was defeated on 22 September 1951 with 49.44 per cent in favour and three of the six states carrying it. The case against it was led by Opposition Leader H. V. Evatt, who had also appeared as counsel in the High Court challenge.	
Petrov Affair	1954	Government: Liberal; Opposition: ALP	Vladimir Petrov; Evdokia Petrova; Robert Menzies; H. V. Evatt	Petrov and his wife defected from the USSR to Australia in dramatic circumstances, which the Menzies Government exploited for political gain in the lead-up to the 1954 election.	
ALP split of 1955	1955	Opposition: ALP; Crossbench: ALP (Anti-Communist)	H. V. Evatt; B. A. Santamaria	ALP members opposed to Evatt's leadership, predominantly associated with the anti-communist Industrial Groups and Santamaria's Catholic Social Studies Movement, either left the party or were expelled, forming what eventually became the Democratic Labor Party.	
National Service Scheme and the commitment to Vietnam	1964–1972	Government: Liberal/Country; Opposition: ALP	Robert Menzies; Harold Holt; Arthur Calwell; Gough Whitlam	The National Service Act 1964 introduced selective conscription of twenty-year-old men chosen by a ballot of birthdates. Menzies announced the commitment of a combat battalion to Vietnam on 29 April 1965, and in March 1966 the Holt government announced that conscripts would serve there. Of 63,735 national servicemen, more than 15,300 served in Vietnam and 200 were killed. Conscription and the war became among the most divisive domestic issues of the period, and the scheme was abolished by the incoming Whitlam government in December 1972.	

=== Holt government ===
Controversy "name"	Date	Parties involved	People involved	Summary	Source
Melbourne–Voyager collision	1964–1967	Government: Liberal/Country	Robert Menzies; John Spicer; Harold Holt; Edward St John	The government stalled on holding a second royal commission into the collision, following concerns over the conclusions of the first.	
VIP affair	1967	Government: Liberal; Opposition: ALP; Crossbench: DLP	Harold Holt; Peter Howson; Vince Gair; Arthur Calwell; John Gorton	Government cover-up of misuse of RAAF VIP flights; Holt and Howson misled parliament.	

=== Gorton government ===
Controversy "name"	Date	Parties involved	People involved	Summary	Source
Vietnam Moratorium	1970	Government: Liberal/Country; Opposition: ALP	John Gorton; Jim Cairns; Billy Snedden	The first moratorium against the Vietnam War on 8 May 1970 drew about 200,000 people nationally, including about 70,000 in Melbourne in a march led by the Labor member Jim Cairns — at the time the largest demonstrations in Australian history. The Minister for Labour and National Service, Billy Snedden, described the participants as "political bikies who pack-rape democracy", a characterisation that itself drew wide criticism.	
Resignation of Malcolm Fraser and fall of the Gorton government	1971	Government: Liberal/Country	John Gorton; Malcolm Fraser; Thomas Daly; William McMahon	Defence Minister Malcolm Fraser resigned on 8 March 1971 over Gorton's conduct in a dispute with the Chief of the General Staff, Sir Thomas Daly, telling parliament the following day that he did not believe Gorton was "fit to hold the great office of Prime Minister". A party-room confidence motion on 10 March was tied 33–33; Gorton declared that this was not a vote of confidence and stood down, and William McMahon replaced him as prime minister. Accounts differ as to whether Gorton formally cast a casting vote against himself.	

=== McMahon government ===
Controversy "name"	Date	Parties involved	People involved	Summary	Source
Aboriginal Tent Embassy	1972	Government: Liberal/Country; Opposition: ALP	William McMahon; Michael Anderson; Gough Whitlam	On the eve of Australia Day 1972 McMahon announced that the government would offer Aboriginal people fifty-year general purpose leases rather than recognise land rights, reserving mineral and forest rights to the Crown. Four Aboriginal men responded by erecting a beach umbrella on the lawns opposite Parliament House on 26 January, establishing the Aboriginal Tent Embassy. In July 1972 the government amended the Trespass on Commonwealth Lands Ordinance and police forcibly removed the camp, arresting eight people; in September the ACT Supreme Court held the ordinance had not taken effect because it had not been properly notified.	

=== Whitlam government ===
Controversy "name"	Date	Parties involved	People involved	Summary	Source
Gair Affair	1974	ALP	Vince Gair, Gough Whitlam, Joh Bjelke-Petersen, Lionel Murphy, Ron Maunsell, Magnus Cormack, Billy Snedden		
Morosi Affair	1974–1977	ALP	Jim Cairns, Junie Morosi		
Loans affair	1975	ALP	Jim Cairns, Rex Connor		
1975 Australian constitutional crisis	1975	ALP; Liberal Party	Gough Whitlam, Malcolm Fraser, Sir John Kerr	Kerr dismissed the sitting government of the day	

=== Fraser government ===
Controversy "name"	Date	Parties involved	People involved	Summary	Source
	1976	Government: Liberal	Vic Garland	Garland resigned as Minister for Post and Telecommunications after being charged with electoral offences. They were dismissed and he returned to the ministry in 1977.	
	1977	Government: Liberal	Phillip Lynch	Lynch resigned as Treasurer following allegations of a conflict of interest relating to his land dealings. Two reports found he had not acted illegally and he returned to the ministry one month later in a different portfolio.	
	1978	Government: Liberal	Reg Withers	Withers was sacked as Minister for Administrative Services after a Queensland royal commission found he had attempted to interfere with an electoral redistribution.	
	1979	Government: NCP	Ian Sinclair	Sinclair resigned as Minister for Primary Industry after a report to the New South Wales parliament accused him of inappropriate business dealings. He was charged with fraud but acquitted, and returned to the ministry in 1980.	
Colour TV affair	1982	Government: Liberal	Michael MacKellar; John Moore	MacKellar submitted an incorrect customs declaration relating to his importation of a colour television, which Moore attempted to cover up. Both resigned from the ministry.	

=== Hawke government ===
Controversy "name"	Date	Parties involved	People involved	Summary	Source
Combe–Ivanov affair	1983	Government: ALP	David Combe; Valery Ivanov; Mick Young	Young resigned as Special Minister of State following revelations he had leaked the government's decision to expel Soviet diplomat Ivanov.	
Lionel Murphy affair	1984–1986	Government: ALP; Opposition: Liberal	Lionel Murphy; Bob Hawke	Newspapers published transcripts of telephone conversations illegally recorded by New South Wales police, said to implicate Murphy — a serving justice of the High Court and a former Labor attorney-general — in attempts to influence a prosecution. Two Senate select committees examined the matter in 1984. Murphy was convicted in July 1985 of attempting to pervert the course of justice, had the conviction quashed on appeal, and was acquitted at a retrial in April 1986. A parliamentary commission of inquiry of three retired judges was then established to consider whether he should be removed from office; it was abolished after he was found to have terminal cancer, and he died in October 1986.	
Australia Card	1985–1987	Government: ALP; Opposition: Liberal; Nationals	Bob Hawke; Ewart Smith	The government's proposal for a national identity card was twice rejected by the Senate and became the trigger for the 1987 double dissolution election. After the government was returned, the retired public servant Ewart Smith identified that the Bill's operative provisions depended on regulations that either house could disallow, leaving the scheme unworkable without Senate consent. The government announced in October 1987 that it would not proceed.	
	1987	Government: ALP	John Brown	Brown resigned from the ministry after misleading parliament over World Expo 88 tenders.	
	1988	Government: ALP	Mick Young; Stephen Loosley	Young resigned from parliament and the ministry after allegations he had mishandled campaign donations. Loosley later accepted responsibility for the errors.	
Pilots' dispute	1989	Government: ALP	Bob Hawke; Australian Federation of Air Pilots	The Australian Federation of Air Pilots sought a 29.47 per cent pay rise outside the wage-fixing guidelines of the Accord. After the pilots imposed work bans and then resigned en masse, the government authorised RAAF aircraft and foreign airlines to carry domestic passengers and compensated the airlines. The federation was destroyed and its award cancelled; the disruption was reported to have cost the economy more than a billion dollars.	

=== Keating government ===
Controversy "name"	Date	Parties involved	People involved	Summary	Source
Marshall Islands affair	1992	Government: ALP	Graham Richardson; Greg Symons	Richardson was censured by the Senate and resigned from the ministry due to controversy over his dealings with Symons, a businessman charged with forgery in relation to a migration scheme based in the Marshall Islands.	
Sandwich shop affair	1994	Government: ALP	Alan Griffiths	Griffiths resigned from the ministry after allegations he had misused party and government resources for personal gain. He was later cleared of wrongdoing by an Australian Federal Police investigation.	
Sports rorts affair	1994	Government: ALP	Ros Kelly	Kelly resigned from the ministry, and later from parliament, over allegations of pork barreling.	

=== Howard government ===
Controversy "name"	Date	Parties involved	People involved	Summary	Source
	1996	Government: Liberal	Jim Short; Brian Gibson	Short and Gibson separately resigned as parliamentary secretaries due to conflicts of interest relating to their shareholdings.	
	1997	Government: Liberal	Geoff Prosser	Prosser resigned from the ministry due to a conflict of interest relating to his ownership of a small business.	
Travel rorts	1997	Government: Liberal/National	David Jull; Peter McGauran; John Sharp	Sharp and McGauran resigned from the ministry over false travel expense claims, while Jull resigned due after allowing Sharp to make secret payments and tabling an inaccurate report.	
Waterfront dispute	1997–1998	Government: Liberal; Nationals	John Howard; Peter Reith; Patrick Corporation; Maritime Union of Australia	Patrick Corporation restructured its operations and in April 1998 dismissed about 1,400 waterside workers overnight, replacing them with a non-union workforce; the terminals were secured by guards with dogs, some wearing balaclavas. The government publicly supported the action. Former soldiers had earlier been recruited for stevedoring training in Dubai, which the company and the government said at the time they knew nothing of; documents released later, and an account by the then transport minister, indicated that ministers had been told of the plan months earlier. The Federal Court and then the High Court found against the company in 1998 and the workers were reinstated before a negotiated settlement.	
Tampa affair	2001	Government: Liberal	John Howard; Philip Ruddock	The government refused to allow asylum-seekers to enter Australia, using Special Air Service Regiment soldiers to board the MV Tampa, a Norwegian freighter that had rescued them from a sinking vessel.	
Children Overboard affair	2001	Government: Liberal	John Howard; Peter Reith	Howard falsely claimed that asylum seekers were throwing their children into the water so the navy would be forced to rescue them.	
Australia–East Timor spying scandal	2004	Government: Liberal	Bernard Collaery		
Unlawful detention of Cornelia Rau	2005	Government: Liberal	Philip Ruddock		
Unlawful deportation of Vivian Solon	2005	Government: Liberal	Philip Ruddock		
AWB oil-for-wheat scandal	2006	Government: Liberal	Terence Cole	A royal commission found that AWB Limited had paid kickbacks to Saddam Hussein's regime in Iraq in exchange for lucrative wheat contracts, contravening UN sanctions.	
Muhamed Haneef affair	2007	Government: Liberal	Muhamed Haneef; Philip Ruddock; Kevin Andrews	Haneef's visa was cancelled following false allegations he had aided terrorists.	
Lindsay pamphlet scandal	2007	Government: Liberal	Jackie Kelly; David Bradbury	Liberal Party volunteers distributed fake pamphlets purporting to be from an Islamic organisation.	

=== Rudd government ===
Controversy "name"	Date	Parties involved	People involved	Summary	Source
Utegate or OzCar affair	2009	Liberal Party	Malcolm Turnbull, Godwin Grech	Grech claimed Prime Minister Rudd intervened in a grants claim for a Car Dealership, Turnbull as Opposition Leader then seized upon the claims. It was later determined Grech fabricated the entire thing.	
Energy Efficient Homes Package	2010	ALP	Kevin Rudd, Peter Garrett		

=== Gillard government ===
Controversy "name"	Date	Parties involved	People involved	Summary	Source
Health Services Union expenses affair	2010	ALP	Craig Thomson, Health Services Union, Kathy Jackson, Fair Work Australia, Julia Gillard, Michael Williamson		
Carbon pricing and the 2010 pledge	2010–2014	ALP; Greens; Liberal Party	Julia Gillard, Wayne Swan, Tony Abbott	Before the 2010 election Gillard said that "there will be no carbon tax under the government I lead". The election produced a hung parliament, and the agreement with the Greens and independents that allowed Labor to govern was followed by the Clean Energy Act 2011, which set a fixed carbon price from July 2012. The reversal was attacked as a broken promise, dominated the political debate for the rest of the parliament, and the scheme was repealed in July 2014.	
Ditch the Witch	2011	Liberal Party	Tony Abbott, Bronwyn Bishop, Sophie Mirabella	In a protest against the Gillard government's carbon tax a number of MPs from the Liberal party were pictured in front of signs saying "Ditch the Witch" and "JuLiar... Bob Brown's Bitch"	
Peter Slipper affair	2012	Liberal Party; ALP	Peter Slipper, James Ashby		

=== Abbott government ===
Controversy "name"	Date	Parties involved	People involved	Summary	Source
Spying on Indonesian officials	2009–2013	Liberal Party; ALP	Tony Abbott	Australian spy agencies attempted to tap the phones of high ranking Indonesian officials including the president. Abbott refused to apologise	
Australian Water Holdings corruption scandal	2013	Liberal Party	Arthur Sinodinos	Corruption in Australian Water Holdings and ICAC investigation into fundraising at the Liberal Party	
Duke of Edinburgh knighthood	2015	Liberal Party	Tony Abbott	After controversially reinstating knighthoods, Abbott gave one of the first knighthoods to Prince Philip rather than to an Australian	
Choppergate	2015	Liberal Party	Bronwyn Bishop	Bishop was found to have chartered a helicopter to a Liberal Party fundraiser. This was charged at over $5,000 for what would have been a 1 hour drive.	

=== Turnbull government ===
Controversy "name"	Date	Parties involved	People involved	Summary	Source
2017–18 Australian parliamentary eligibility crisis	2017	Liberal Party; Nationals; ALP; Greens; Xenophon; One Nation	Scott Ludlam, Larissa Waters, Matt Canavan, Malcolm Roberts, Barnaby Joyce, Fiona Nash, Nick Xenophon and others	Parliamentarians of various parties were found to be in breach of Section 44 of the Constitution which prohibits dual citizens from sitting in parliament	
Bonk Ban	2018	Nationals	Barnaby Joyce	Joyce who was married at the time, was discovered having an affair with a staffer, who was pregnant with his baby. In response a code of conduct was introduced that prevented relationships between MPs and staffers	
Helloworld scandal	2019	Liberal Party	Mathias Cormann, Joe Hockey	It was uncovered that government contracts were being given to a Liberal Party donor, who was also paying for the holidays of a number of MPs	

=== Morrison government ===
Controversy "name"	Date	Parties involved	People involved	Summary	Source
Allegations of war crimes by Australian special forces in Afghanistan between 2005 and 2016	2016–21	Morrison government	David McBride, Dan Oakes, Sam Clark, Annika Smethurst, Peter Dutton, Christian Porter, and others	Publication of the allegations, based on leaked documents, by the ABC lead in 2019 to the Australian Federal Police raiding the ABC's Ultimo offices (as well as News Corp journalist Annika Smethurst's home, due to her reporting on another leaked plan to allow the ASD to spy on Australian citizens). Media organisations feared the raids posed a severe threat to investigative journalism, as well as to Australia's reputation as a free and open democracy. See also the Brereton Report.	
Robodebt	2016–19	Liberal Party	Scott Morrison, Stuart Robert, Christian Porter	Centrelink were issuing automated illegal debts that had not been incurred by the individuals concerned. Scott Morrison was the lead figure in this scandal, he was the minister responsible for designing, funding, approving and continuing the project. The settlement cost the Australian taxpayers $112 million. Many people committed suicide after receiving the debt letters.	
It's okay to be white	2018	Liberal Party One Nation	Christian Porter Mathias Cormann Pauline Hanson	The governing Coalition supported a motion in the Senate declaring "it's ok to be white" and opposing the "deplorable rise of anti-white racism and attacks on Western civilisation"	
Chinese election signs	2019	Liberal Party	Gladys Liu Josh Frydenberg	The Liberal party put up signs in Mandarin in places with large Chinese populations that were deliberately made to look like they were produced by the AEC. The signs directed voters to vote for the Liberal Party.	
2019–20 bushfire response	2019–2020	Liberal Party	Scott Morrison	Scott Morrison took a family holiday to Hawaii during one of the worst bushfire seasons on record. He returned only after significant public pressure. When touring bushfire affected communities, many residents refused to engage with Morrison. On a number of occasions Morrison forced a handshake on residents.	
Sports rorts affair (2020)	2019–20	Liberal Party; Nationals	Bridget McKenzie	The government were providing grants for sports projects for communities in marginal electorates. Many of these projects were considered low priority or previously rejected, and were seen as a way to defend the marginal electorates.	
Brian Houston invited to the White House	2020	Liberal Party	Scott Morrison	Scott Morrison's pastor, Houston, was invited by Morrison to attend an official White House dinner. Houston is under investigation for covering up his father's sex abuse. Morrison continually denied this as gossip until admitting it was true.	
Destruction of Aboriginal cultural sites	2020	Liberal Party	Ken Wyatt, Ben Wyatt	Miners Rio Tinto destroyed two sites of Aboriginal cultural significance in Juukan Gorge.	
2021 Australian Parliament House sexual misconduct allegations	2021	Liberal Party Labor Party	Brittany Higgins, Linda Reynolds, Christian Porter, Scott Morrison, Andrew Laming	Two separate ongoing allegations including rape and sexual assault, both raised in February 2021, causing controversy for the Liberal-National Morrison government. These allegations have sparked further discussions over workplace culture, systemic misogyny and victim blaming within the Morrison government and Parliament as a whole, with the government heavily criticised for its response.	
Murugappan family asylum claims	2018–2021	Liberal Party	Scott Morrison, Peter Dutton, Karen Andrews	A Tamil family from Sri Lanka had applied for asylum. The government rejected their claims and wanted to send them back to Sri Lanka with their two Australian-born children. The family was sent to offshore detention for years while their case was taken to court.	
Car park rorts affair	2021	Liberal Party	Scott Morrison, Josh Frydenberg, Tim Wilson, Michael Sukkar	The government handed out grants to build carparks near train stations a day before a federal election was called. The carparks had no tender process and were almost exclusively in Liberal party seats. Some were cancelled, or the site was not near train stations.	
Scott Morrison ministerial positions controversy	2020–2022	Liberal Party	Scott Morrison, David Hurley, Christian Porter	Scott Morrison had himself secretly sworn in as Health Minister, Finance Minister, Treasurer, Home Affairs Minister, and Industry, Science, Energy, and Resources Minister at various times between 2020 and 2021, without announcement to the public, to Parliament, to the Ministerial staff, or in most cases to the existing relevant Ministers.	
Qantas pandemic support and JobKeeper	2020–2023	Liberal Party; Nationals	Scott Morrison, Josh Frydenberg, Alan Joyce	Qantas received about $2.7 billion in Commonwealth pandemic assistance, including $856 million in JobKeeper wage subsidies, among the largest amounts disclosed by any listed company. The scheme required no repayment by firms whose earnings recovered and Qantas repaid none of it; the airline returned to a record profit in 2023, and its chief executive rejected calls to repay, saying the aircraft funding had been for services provided and JobKeeper had gone to employees. Critics including the Transport Workers' Union noted that Qantas had outsourced about 1,700 ground-handling jobs in 2020, which the Federal Court and, on appeal, the High Court found to be unlawful. Treasurer Jim Chalmers said repayment had not been a condition of the assistance when the previous government provided it.	

=== Albanese government ===
Controversy "name"	Date	Parties involved	People involved	Summary	Source
PwC tax scandal	2022–2023	n/a	Peter-John Collins, Tom Seymour, Jim Chalmers	A PwC partner who had signed confidentiality agreements while advising the Treasury on multinational tax-avoidance legislation shared confidential government information within the firm, where it was used to market tax-planning services to clients. The conduct dated from 2014 to 2016; emails released by the Senate in May 2023 showed the material had circulated to dozens of partners. Treasury referred the matter to the Australian Federal Police, the firm's Australian chief executive resigned and partners were stood down, and PwC sold its Commonwealth consulting business for one dollar. Parliamentary inquiries into the government's use of consultants followed.	
Qatar Airways flight rights decision	2023	Labor Party	Catherine King, Anthony Albanese, Alan Joyce, Bridget McKenzie	In July 2023 the Minister for Infrastructure and Transport, Catherine King, refused an application by Qatar Airways for 21 additional weekly services to Sydney, Melbourne and Brisbane. Qantas, a competitor on Europe–Australia routes, had publicly opposed the application. Qatar Airways told a Senate inquiry it had learned of the refusal through the media and that the letter it later received gave no reasons. Former ACCC chairs Allan Fels and Rod Sims said the decision protected Qantas and kept international airfares high; King said she had "not based that decision on any one company's commercial interest, but in the national interest". A Senate select committee recommended in October 2023 that the decision be reviewed immediately and that statements of reasons be published for future bilateral decisions; King rejected the recommendation and described the inquiry as a "ridiculous farce". In February 2025 the government approved Qatar Airways acquiring a 25 per cent stake in Virgin Australia, which subsequently began operating Doha services using wet-leased Qatar Airways aircraft.	
Qantas Chairman's Lounge memberships	2023–2025	Cross-party	Anthony Albanese, Peter Dutton, Adam Bandt, David Pocock, Alan Joyce	The Chairman's Lounge is an invitation-only Qantas lounge network whose membership cannot be purchased and is granted at the airline's discretion. An analysis of the House of Representatives and Senate registers of interests published in October 2024 found that 181 of the 227 sitting federal parliamentarians had disclosed access, including 122 of the 151 members of the House of Representatives. Reporting in 2023 established that membership also extended to senior public servants and regulators — among them five of the seven ACCC commissioners at a time when the commission was investigating Qantas — and to members of the judiciary. Critics argued the arrangement created a perception that officials responsible for regulating the airline were under obligation to it; the ACCC said its decisions were "made collectively, impartially and on their merits", and senior ACCC officials relinquished their memberships in January 2025. A review of Commonwealth travel policy completed in December 2024 recorded concerns that "access to exclusive lounges provided by Qantas and Virgin may unduly influence Government travel patterns", while also finding that on the busiest contested routes the government booked a smaller share of tickets with Qantas than Qantas's share of available flights. The government subsequently directed public servants not to accept upgrades but left memberships unchanged; no equivalent rule applies to parliamentarians.	
National Anti-Corruption Commission handling of Robodebt referrals	2024–2026	n/a	Paul Brereton, Gail Furness, Geoffrey Nettle, Scott Morrison	In June 2024 the National Anti-Corruption Commission (NACC) announced it would not investigate the six people referred to it by the Royal Commission into the Robodebt Scheme, saying their conduct had already been fully explored. In October 2024 the Inspector of the NACC, Gail Furness, found that Commissioner Paul Brereton, who had disclosed a close association with one of the six, had delegated the decision but remained involved in it to a degree that gave rise to apprehended bias; she made no finding of actual bias or intentional wrongdoing. Former High Court justice Geoffrey Nettle was appointed to reconsider the decision, and the commission opened an investigation in 2025. It reported in March 2026 that two former senior officials had engaged in serious corrupt conduct, cleared four others including former prime minister Scott Morrison, and referred no one for prosecution.	
CFMEU administration	2024–2025	Labor Party	Tony Burke, John Setka, Anthony Albanese	Media investigations published in July 2024 alleged that organised crime figures and outlaw motorcycle gang associates had gained influence within the construction division of the CFMEU, a Labor Party affiliate and one of its largest donors. The union's Victorian secretary John Setka resigned shortly before publication. The Australian Council of Trade Unions suspended the division, Labor branches moved to sever ties and refuse donations, and Workplace Relations Minister Tony Burke referred the allegations to the Australian Federal Police. The government then legislated to place the division into administration; former officials challenged the law, and in June 2025 the High Court upheld it.	
Parliamentary flight upgrades	2024	Cross-party	Anthony Albanese, Alan Joyce, Peter Dutton, Bridget McKenzie	In October 2024 Joe Aston's book The Chairman's Lounge reported that Prime Minister Anthony Albanese had accepted at least 22 complimentary Qantas upgrades over more than a decade, and alleged that he had dealt directly with then chief executive Alan Joyce about his personal travel and about Chairman's Lounge membership for his adult son. Albanese said all of the upgrades had been declared on the register of members' interests as required, and denied telephoning Joyce to request them. The Centre for Public Integrity said it was "a real problem" for politicians responsible for regulating Qantas to receive such benefits, and the opposition questioned whether the upgrades bore on the government's Qatar Airways decision; Albanese said his dealings with Qantas were no different from those with other airlines. Several other parliamentarians, including Coalition and Greens members, subsequently amended or reviewed their own declarations, and Opposition Leader Peter Dutton corrected a statement about his office seeking access to a private jet.	
2025 Australian parliamentary expenses controversy	2025	Labor Party	Anika Wells, Don Farrell, Michelle Rowland	Several ministers in the Albanese government misused public funds for personal and family travel, including to attend social engagements and sporting events.	
Marrickville Golf Club grant	2026	Labor Party	Anthony Albanese	Albanese announced a $6 million grant for a golf club in his own electorate as part of an invite-only grant scheme. Albanese held an honorary membership at the club, which he had never disclosed. Albanese told Parliament the grant would finance urgent remedial work on the club's sewerage system and claimed he had no association with the club. Infrastructure department representatives stated that the grant was unrelated to sewerage works, and an ABC investigation revealed Albanese had a decades-long association with the club.	

== State controversies ==
=== New South Wales ===
Controversy "name"	Date	Administration	People involved	Summary	Source
1932 New South Wales constitutional crisis	1932	Lang	Dismissal of NSW Premier Jack Lang by governor Philip Game		
Metherell affair	1992	Greiner	Nick Greiner, Tim Moore, Terry Metherell		
Orange Grove affair	2004	Carr			
Eddie Obeid corruption scandals	2012	Carr, Iemma, Rees, Keneally	Eddie Obeid, Ian Macdonald		
Grangegate	2014	O'Farrell	Barry O'Farrell	O'Farrell received a $3,000 bottle of Grange Hermitage and did not declare it.	
Gladys Berejiklian resignation	2021	Berejiklian	Gladys Berejiklian	Berejiklian resigned when it was revealed that she was under ICAC investigation.	
John Barilaro Trade Commissioner appointment	2021	Perrottet	John Barilaro, Stuart Ayres	Barilaro was appointed to a trade commissioner position in New York, questions raised about impropriety, Barilaro violently attacks cameraman, Ayres resigns as Trade Minister	

=== Queensland ===
Controversy "name"	Date	Administration	People involved	Summary	Source
Mungana affair	1929	Theodore	Corrupt actions by Qld. Premiers Ted Theodore and William McCormack		
Bjelkemander	1972—1987	Bjelke-Petersen	Joh Bjelke-Petersen	Use of Malapportionment to keep National Party and Bjelke-Petersen in power.	
Fitzgerald Inquiry	1987	Bjelke-Petersen	Joh Bjelke-Petersen, Terry Lewis, Leisha Harvey, Don Lane, Brian Austin	Commission of Inquiry into Police Corruption	
Scott Driscoll corruption scandals	2013	Newman	Scott Driscoll		

=== South Australia ===
Controversy "name"	Date	Administration	People involved	Summary	Source
Playmander	1936–1968	Playford	Thomas Playford IV	South Australian Electoral "gerrymander" favouring the Liberal and Country League and Sir Thomas Playford	
Hindmarsh Island bridge controversy	1989–1997	Bannon, Arnold, Brown, Olsen	Ngarrindjeri people, Tom and Wendy Chapman, Michael Armitage, Robert Tickner, Ian McLachlan, John von Doussa	Building of a road bridge at Goolwa, linking Hindmarsh Island to the town. Resulted in the Hindmarsh Island Royal Commission.	
State Bank of South Australia collapse	1991	Bannon		It caused the resignation of premier John Bannon in 1992, and the crushing electoral defeat of the South Australian Labor government at the 1993 election.	
Motorola affair	2001	Olsen	John Olsen		

=== Tasmania ===
Controversy "name"	Date	Administration	People involved	Summary	Source
Edmund Rouse bribery scandal	1989		Jim Cox, Robin Gray, Gunns		

=== Victoria ===
Controversy "name"	Date	Administration	People involved	Summary	Source
State Bank of Victoria collapse	1990	Kirner		These events were a key factor in the defeat of the Labor government of Joan Kirner and the election of the Liberal Party, led by Jeff Kennett, at the 1992 Victorian state election	
Red Shirts rorts scandal	2018	Andrews	Daniel Andrews	In 2018, the Victorian Ombudsman found the Victorian Labor had misused $388,000 of taxpayer funds which were used to win the 2014 Victorian election.	
Branch stacking scandal	2020	Andrews	Daniel Andrews, Adem Somyurek, Jenny Mikakos	High level and wide reaching cases of branch stacking (internal vote rigging) in the Victorian Labor party. Outcome was the federal party taking over the state branch for several years to fix the problem	

=== Western Australia ===
Controversy "name"	Date	Administration	People involved	Summary	Source
Nevanas affair	1915	Scaddan	Actions leading to the downfall of John Scaddan's W.A. government		
WA Inc royal commission	1992	Burke	Brian Burke, Alan Bond, Laurie Connell		
Easton affair	1992	Court	Carmen Lawrence		
