= Cameron Hayes =

Australian painter (born 1969)

- Born: 1969 (age 56–57); Sydney, Australia
- Education: RMIT, Melbourne, Australia
- Known for: Large scale oil painting
- Style: Figurative, Narrative, Allegorical painting styles

Cameron Kingsley Hayes (born 1969), known as Cameron Hayes, is an Australian artist specialising in large scale allegorical oil paintings in a figurative style. His paintings have been selected for numerous prestigious Australian art prizes including The Blake Prize, Moet and Chandon Fellowship and the Sir John Sulman Art Prize at the Art Gallery of New South Wales.

== Early life and education ==
Cameron Hayes was born in Sydney in 1969. His family relocated to Melbourne where he attended St Kevin's College in Toorak. When his father was jailed, he remained at the school on scholarship. He attended RMIT University (Bachelor of Arts, Fine Arts) in Melbourne, Australia.

== Work ==
Cameron Hayes is a painter using traditional oil pigments on linen. He paints intricate, multi-layered compositions encompassing subjects from Australian identity, contemporary culture, global politics, history, ethics and observational human behaviour. Each canvas relates to a "story" requiring the artist to research subjects from a multidisciplinary perspective, utilising narrative and allegorical devices to compose the artwork. He is an Australian figurative painter who creates visually complex artworks made up of uniquely individual characters, scenes and motifs intersecting across expansive picture planes, often described by critics and writers as being in the style of Hieronymus Bosch. The artist's work exhibited in 2011 exhibition in New York was described by Village Voice's Robert Shuster as "rich panoramas of satiric dystopian visions, imaginative allegories reminiscent of Hieronymus Bosch".

A major work painted 2009-2011 uses the 2007 Australian federal election as its backdrop. Some members of the Australian Liberal Party conducted a pamphlet drop within the marginal seat of Lindsay - a predominantly white, working class community. They falsified an organisation called the Islamic Australia Federation and in the pamphlets thanked the opposing Australian Labor party for seeking clemency for terrorists, for building mosques in Lindsay electorate, and for supporting the Bali bomber terrorists. The painting 'What happens when pretend politicians pretend to be terrorists' tells the story of the public fallout of the fraudulent fear campaign had on Muslim girls at the local school, and upon the Australian psyche. This event is referred to as the Lindsay pamphlet scandal.

Cameron Hayes’ first major solo exhibition was held in 2000 in Melbourne, Australia, of which Australian author and previous editor of Art Monthly Australasia Peter Timms wrote in The Age Newspaper: "His mind is on social history, which he satirizes with a vengeance. Hayes Is a Hogarth or a Daumier for the 21st century. At the level of style and technique his painting is all control…The eye scans the surface, taking in each bizarre anecdote, and taking delight in their bitter humour."

== Awards ==
- 2015 Finalist, Sir John Sulman Art Prize, Art Gallery of New South Wales, Sydney
- 2014 Finalist, Sir John Sulman Art Prize, Art Gallery of New South Wales, Sydney
- 2005 Winner, The Footy Show, The Artist's Garden, Fitzroy, Melbourne
- 2001 Finalist, Blake Prize for Religious Art, Australia
- 1998 Finalist, Blake Prize for Religious Art, Australia
- 1998 Finalist, Sir John Sulman Art Prize, Art Gallery of New South Wales, Sydney
- 1996 Finalist, Moët and Chandon Fellowship, Australia
- 1995 Finalist, Sir John Sulman Art Prize, Art Gallery of New South Wales, Sydney
- 1995 Finalist, Blake Prize for Religious Art, Australia
- 1994 Finalist, Blake Prize for Religious Art, Australia
- 1994 Finalist, Moët and Chandon Fellowship, Australia
- 1993 Finalist, Joan Baird Prize, Steps Gallery, Melbourne, Australia
- 1993 Finalist, Hugh Ramsay Religious Art Award, Clydebank, Melbourne, Australia
- 1993 Finalist, Allied Union Art Prize, Steps Gallery, Melbourne, Australia
