= Denis Warner =

Australian journalist (1917–2012)

Denis Warner CMG OBE
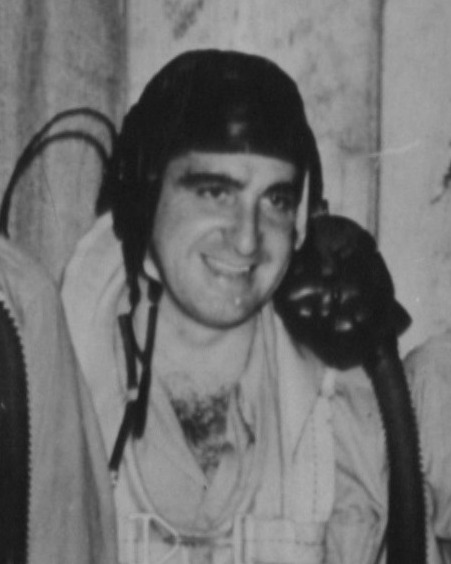
- Warner as a war correspondent in 1944
- Born: 12 December 1917; New Norfolk, Tasmania, Australia
- Died: 12 July 2012 (aged 94); Melbourne, Victoria, Australia
- Occupation: Journalist

Denis Ashton Warner CMG OBE (12 December 1917 – 12 July 2012) was an Australian journalist, war correspondent and historian.

Warner was born in New Norfolk in Tasmania's Derwent Valley. He attended The Hutchins School, where he was school captain, before embarking on a career in journalism. He began working for the Mercury as a copy boy in the late 1930s before being shifted to Melbourne to work for the Herald. After his return from war service in the Middle East (1941–43), he came to the attention of Sir Keith Murdoch, who dispatched him to Asia with the directive to "tell us how it is". On 4 May 1945, Warner was on board the aircraft carrier HMS Formidable near the island of Okinawa when it was hit by a Japanese Kamikaze aircraft, the suicide plane striking the deck only 30 ft from where he stood. Later that year he married Herald reporter Peggy Hick. Following the war's end, he worked for Reuters and the Australian Associated Press as head of the Tokyo bureau, from whence he reported on Japan's post-war experience and interviewed General Douglas MacArthur. In 1949, Warner was instrumental in publicising the case of Lorenzo Gamboa, a Filipino man targeted by the White Australia policy, after a chance encounter in a Tokyo post office.

In 1949 he was appointed Far Eastern Correspondent for the Herald and the London Daily Telegraph, becoming a freelancer in 1955. He was awarded a Fulbright Scholarship in 1956 and an Associate Nieman Fellowship at Harvard University in 1957. He wrote for a number of international news magazines, including the Reporter, Look and the Atlantic. He was a correspondent for the Telegraph on the Korean War, which he described as a "tragic accident". It was during Korea that he developed a bitter rivalry with Wilfred Burchett, whom he considered a traitor for his support of the Chinese.

Warner was a significant correspondent from the Vietnam War, where he was critical of the American conduct of a war he nevertheless supported. He continued to write on Asian affairs until 1983, also serving as a member of the Victorian State Advisory Committee of the Australian Broadcasting Corporation from 1979 to 1981. From 1981 to 1995 he was editor of the Asia-Pacific Defence Reporter. His hawkish foreign policy views distinguished him from many of his more liberal contemporaries.

Warner was appointed Officer of the Order of the British Empire in 1971 and Companion of the Order of St Michael and St George in 1982. He was a foundation patron of the Australia Defence Association in 1981, remaining involved with the organisation until his death. He continued writing into his later life, until ill health and his wife's death in 2010 led to a decline. Warner died in Melbourne in 2012.

== Bibliography ==
Warner published a number of books on Asian affairs:

- Out of the Gun. London: Hutchinson Heinemann. 1956. LCCN 57023397. OCLC 903573801.
- Australia's Northern Neighbours (1957–63)
- Hurricane from China. New York City: Macmillan Inc. 1961. LCCN 61015188. OCLC 255948. S2CID 129288144.
- The Last Confucian. New York City: Macmillan Inc. 1963. LCCN 63014185. OCLC 1379082.
- Reporting South-East Asia. Sydney: Angus & Robertson. 1966. LCCN 66017959. OCLC 230169983.
- The Tide at Sunrise: A History of the Russo-Japanese War, 1904-1905. New York City: Charterhouse. 1974. ISBN 978-0-88327-031-8. LCCN 74175084. OCLC 1132982.
- Not with Guns Alone: How Hanoi Won the War. Richmond, Victoria: Hutchinson. 1977. ISBN 978-0-09-130320-4. OCLC 4114638.
- Certain Victory: How Hanoi Won the War. Kansas City, Missouri: Andrews McMeel Publishing. 1977. ISBN 978-0-8362-6201-8. LCCN unk81035229. OCLC 1106938499.
- The Great Road: Japan's Highway to the 20th Century. Australia: Hutchinson. 1979. OCLC 11966836.
- Kamikaze, the Sacred Warriors 1944-45. Melbourne: Oxford University Press. 1983. ISBN 978-0-19-554426-8. OCLC 1057919758.
- Disaster in the Pacific: New Light on the Battle of Savo Island. North Sydney: Allen & Unwin. 1992. ISBN 978-1-86373-273-4. LCCN 92002602. OCLC 38324926.
- Wake Me If There's Trouble : An Australian Correspondent at the Front Line : Asia at War and Peace 1944-64. Ringwood, Victoria: Penguin Random House. 1995. ISBN 978-0-14-025256-9. OCLC 1057954115.
- Not Always on Horseback: An Australian Correspondent at War and Peace in Asia, 1961-1993. St Leonards, New South Wales: Allen & Unwin. 1997. ISBN 978-1-86448-467-0. LCCN 98156036. OCLC 38255338.
