= Scott Morrison ministerial positions controversy =

Major political scandal in Australia

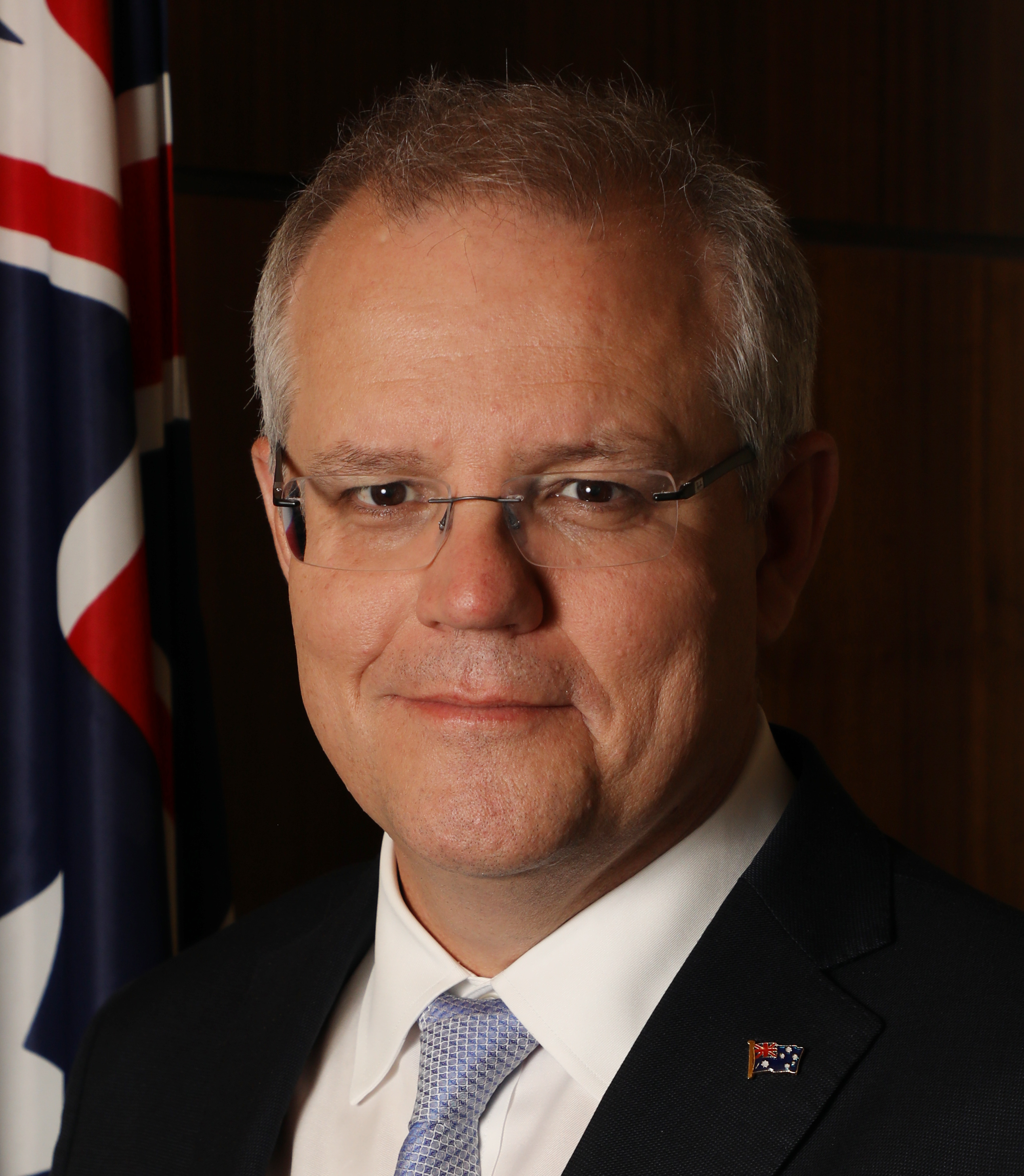
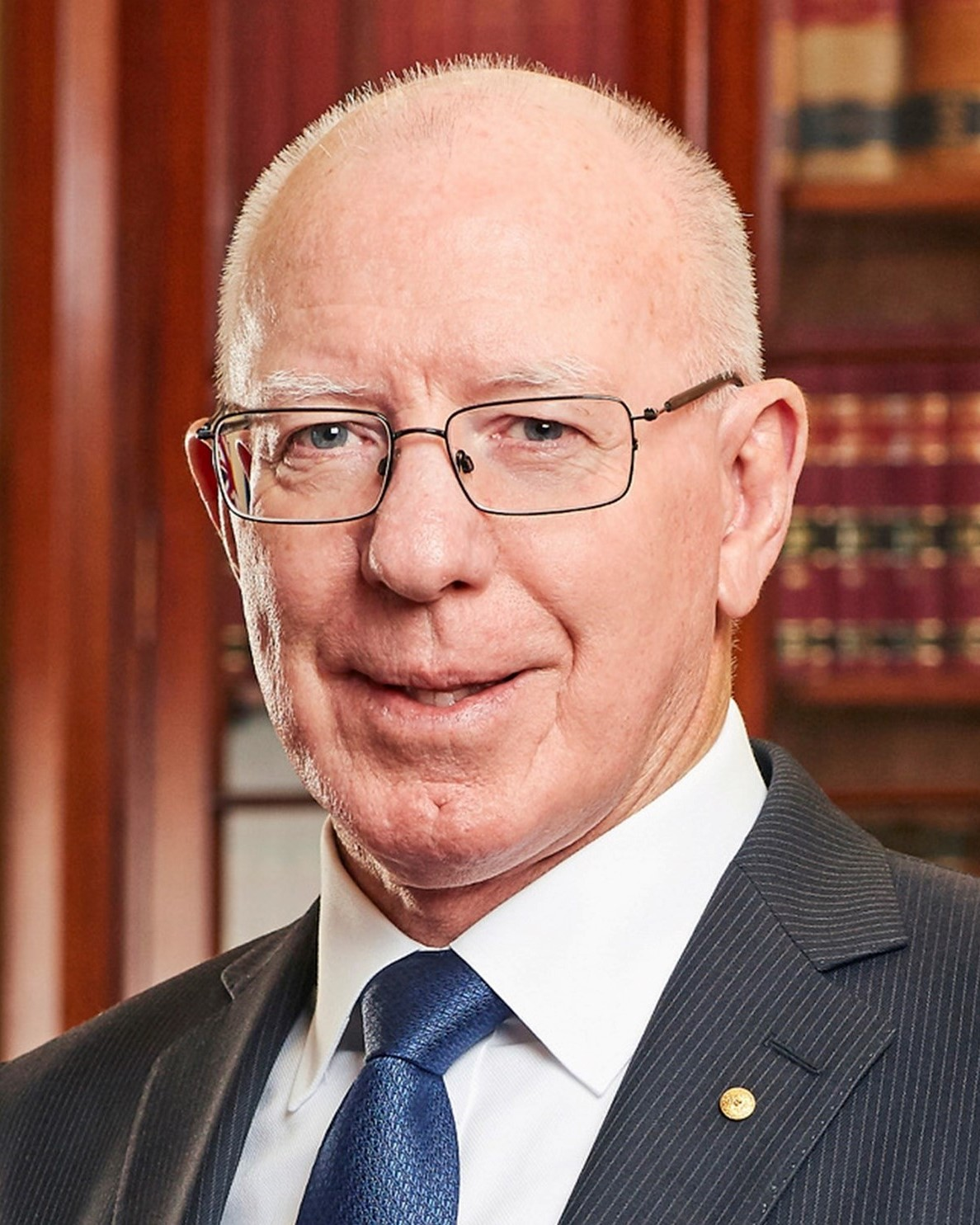
Former prime minister Scott Morrison (left) and former governor-general David Hurley (right)

The Scott Morrison ministerial positions controversy, also known as the multiple ministries scandal, was a major political scandal in Australia involving former prime minister Scott Morrison. Following the 2022 Australian federal election, at which Morrison's government was defeated, it was revealed that Morrison had had himself secretly appointed to five ministerial positions without the knowledge of the public or his own government. An inquiry conducted by former High Court Justice Virginia Bell recommended legislative changes to prevent such a consolidation of decision-making authority in the future. On 29 November 2023, the Ministers of State Amendment Act 2023 came into effect, requiring all future ministerial appointments and certain other appointments to be publicly notified.

== Ministerial appointments ==
Between March 2020 and May 2021, Morrison, Prime Minister at that time, advised the Governor-General David Hurley to appoint him "to administer" five departments in his government, despite there being an incumbent minister in each portfolio.

The five Departments were Health (14 March 2020); Finance (30 March 2020); Industry, Science, Energy and Resources (15 April 2021); and (together) Home Affairs and Treasury (6 May 2021). All were by an instrument headed "Appointment of Minister of State" and appointing "Scott John Morrison, a member of the Federal Executive Council" to "administer" a specified ministry or ministries. They are personally signed, and stated to be sealed with the Great Seal of Australia, by Governor-General David Hurley.

== Public disclosure ==
These appointments were not made public immediately, contrary to usual practice. None of them became publicly known until 13 August 2022, when two of them were mentioned in a newspaper story about a book on the Morrison government's management of the COVID-19 pandemic.

On 15 August 2022, recently elected Prime Minister Anthony Albanese announced an investigation by his office into claims that, on Morrison's advice, the Governor-General, David Hurley had appointed him to three ministerial positions (the Health, Finance, and Resources portfolios) during the COVID-19 pandemic in Australia, although neither the advice nor the appointments had been made public. (Note: Early reports and commentary incorrectly stated that Morrison had been "sworn in" to these positions; he had only to be appointed to them, since he had already been sworn in as a Minister of State in the capacity of prime minister.) The Health Minister at the time, Greg Hunt, was understood to have agreed to Morrison's joint appointment as Health Minister; however, the Finance Minister, Mathias Cormann, was unaware that Morrison had appointed himself in a joint ministerial position. The Resources Minister, Keith Pitt, was aware of Morrison's self-appointment to the resources portfolio "sometime in 2021". David Littleproud, who was the Agriculture Minister in Morrison's government, criticised the self-appointments as "pretty ordinary". (Note: In Australian English, "ordinary" can mean bad or undesirable, cf. definition #4.)

Later that day, the Governor-General's office confirmed that Morrison had been appointed to a number of ministerial offices, without stating which or how many. As a change in the responsibilities of an existing minister, this had not required further swearing-in but had been done by an "administrative instrument"; announcement of the appointments had been a matter for the government. (Note: The statement says that the appointments were made "consistently with" Constitution section 64. Section 64 provides for the appointment of "Ministers of State" to "administer such departments of State of the Commonwealth as the Governor-General in Council may establish". The Governor-General does this formally on the advice of the Executive Council and in effect on that of the prime minister.) Constitutional law professor Anne Twomey, however, could not trace such instruments and called the process "just bizarre". Prime Minister Anthony Albanese ordered a search for them and sought legal advice from the Solicitor-General. Leading members of the Morrison cabinet, Mathias Cormann (Morrison's Minister for Finance) and Peter Dutton (Morrison's Minister for Defence and then Leader of the Opposition), said that they had not been aware of these appointments. Morrison initially declined to comment but later phoned radio station 2GB to say that these three appointments had been "extraordinary measures" as "safeguards" during the COVID pandemic. When asked if he had held any more ministerial positions, Morrison stated that there were none to his "recollection", despite there being two additional appointments still not disclosed to the public at that time. Morrison had himself appointed as joint Resources Minister in order to be able to overrule a decision on gas exploration by the incumbent Resources Minister.

The following day, 16 August, Albanese held a second press conference, confirming that Morrison had been appointed to five portfolios in addition to his appointment as the head of Prime Minister and Cabinet: the Department of Health on 14 March 2020; the Department of Finance on 30 March 2020; the Department of Industry, Science, Energy, and Resources on 15 April 2021; the Department of Home Affairs on 6 May 2021; and the Department of the Treasury on 6 May 2021.

Albanese asked the Solicitor-General for an opinion on the validity of the appointment to the resources ministry. The report, released on 23 August, advised that this appointment was lawful, but that its secrecy "fundamentally undermined" the principles of responsible government.

== Bell inquiry ==
Anthony Albanese announced an inquiry into Scott Morrison's ministerial positions, led by former High Court Justice Virginia Bell.

On 25 November 2022, Bell reported that Morrison's appointment to multiple ministerial positions was "corrosive" to trust in government. She recommended legislation to ensure all ministerial appointments were made public.

== Parliamentary censure ==
A map showing how each member voted on the motion. Yes No Absent

On 30 November 2022, the House of Representatives voted, by 86 votes to 50, for a government motion to censure Scott Morrison for failing to disclose to the parliament and the public his secret appointments to a number of ministries. The Australian Labor Party, Australian Greens, and all crossbench members (aside from Dai Le – who was not present – and Bob Katter) voted in favour of the motion, as did Liberal MP Bridget Archer. The Coalition (aside from Archer) and Katter voted against.

== Governor-General ==
A spokesperson for Governor-General David Hurley stated on 17 August: "The Governor-General had no reason to believe that appointments would not be communicated." Hurley was not criticised by the Solicitor-General, Bell or prime minister Albanese. However, some commentators have queried whether Hurley at least ought to have known and, in that case, to have raised a concern.

== Legal challenge ==
A Federal Court challenge to a decision by Home Affairs minister Karen Andrews claims that the decision was invalid, with arguments that could affect all decisions made by ministers whom Morrison had duplicated. It is claimed that Andrews had no power to make the decision, since Morrison's appointment to the position had displaced her—it being, allegedly, implicit in the Constitution that a ministerial position can have only one occupant. Alternatively, it is claimed that, if there was duplication, the decision was "legally unreasonable" since Andrews and her advisors were unaware of the possibility of referring it to Morrison.

== Junior ministerial appointments ==
In March 2023, it emerged that Morrison had proposed and the Governor-General had approved two junior ministerial appointments, adding to the responsibilities of two existing junior ministers, without public knowledge beyond gazetting. One of those appointments was of an ally of Morrison, Ben Morton, to the ministry of Home Affairs, on the same day as Karen Andrews became minister for Home Affairs. Morton's appointment to Home Affairs was gazetted but never listed, and Andrews maintains that she never knew of it (Morton eventually did not perform any duties in her department).
