= OzCar =

- Founded: 2008

OzCar was a special purpose vehicle (or trust) established by the Australian government to provide financing for car loans after GE Money Motor Solutions and GMAC abandoned the Australian market during the 2008 financial crisis. Its establishment was announced in a media release on 5 December 2008 and it was legally established as a trust on 2 January 2009, although it was not activated until 1 September 2009. Its enabling legislation Car Dealership Financing Guarantee Appropriation Act 2009 received assent on 6 July 2009 and ceased on 4 April 2012 after repeal by the Financial Framework Legislation Amendment Act (No. 1) 2012.

OzCar became involved in the OzCar affair in Australian politics.
