= Car park rorts affair =

Australian political controversy

The Car park rorts affair was the result of a series of grants that the Australian federal government made to build near train stations. It was later revealed that many of the projects were located almost exclusively in Liberal held seats, or in marginal seats. It followed the revelations in the sports rorts affair.

== Background ==
In February 2019, Prime Minister Scott Morrison, along with the minister for cities urban infrastructure and population, Alan Tudge announced a part of their policies for the upcoming election in May.

The government promised $121 million for 1500 car spaces near existing train stations. In the announcement, Morrison mentioned four Liberal members who called for the upgrades, Michael Sukkar, Tony Smith, Tim Wilson and Jason Wood.

It was later announced again on 29 April 2019, 2 weeks before the election, that the amount was increased by $300 million that would get cars off the road by getting people on to public transport.

== Early reporting ==
Following the ANAO report on the sports rorts affair, Michael West Media reported on what they dubbed the "Pork n Ride" program. The initial program was for 13 car parks that were all in Liberal held seats.

At the time that the scheme was being rolled out, estimations of how much traffic would be freed up on the road was wildly overestimated by the government, and the construction would achieve little in terms of getting people on to public transport, although the government claimed that it would make commuting by train easier for locals.

The project then began cancelling some of the projects as it became apparent that the government had under-budgeted with their pre-election commitment.

== ANAO report ==
The Australian National Audit Office (ANAO) released a report on the scheme on 28 June 2021. They found that none of the 47 projects were determined by the department and that the awarding of the projects "was not to an appropriate standard" and was not merit based.

It found that only two of the projects were completed and three had commenced construction almost two years after the federal election. There were also some projects that were cancelled only months after being announced, but after the May election. It also noted that 64% of the projects were located in Victoria.

The report's conclusion stated that "it was not designed to be open or transparent." In the Senate hearing, the ANAO said that the government started with a list of the top 20 marginals helped guide the allocation of funding.

=== Fallout from the ANAO report ===
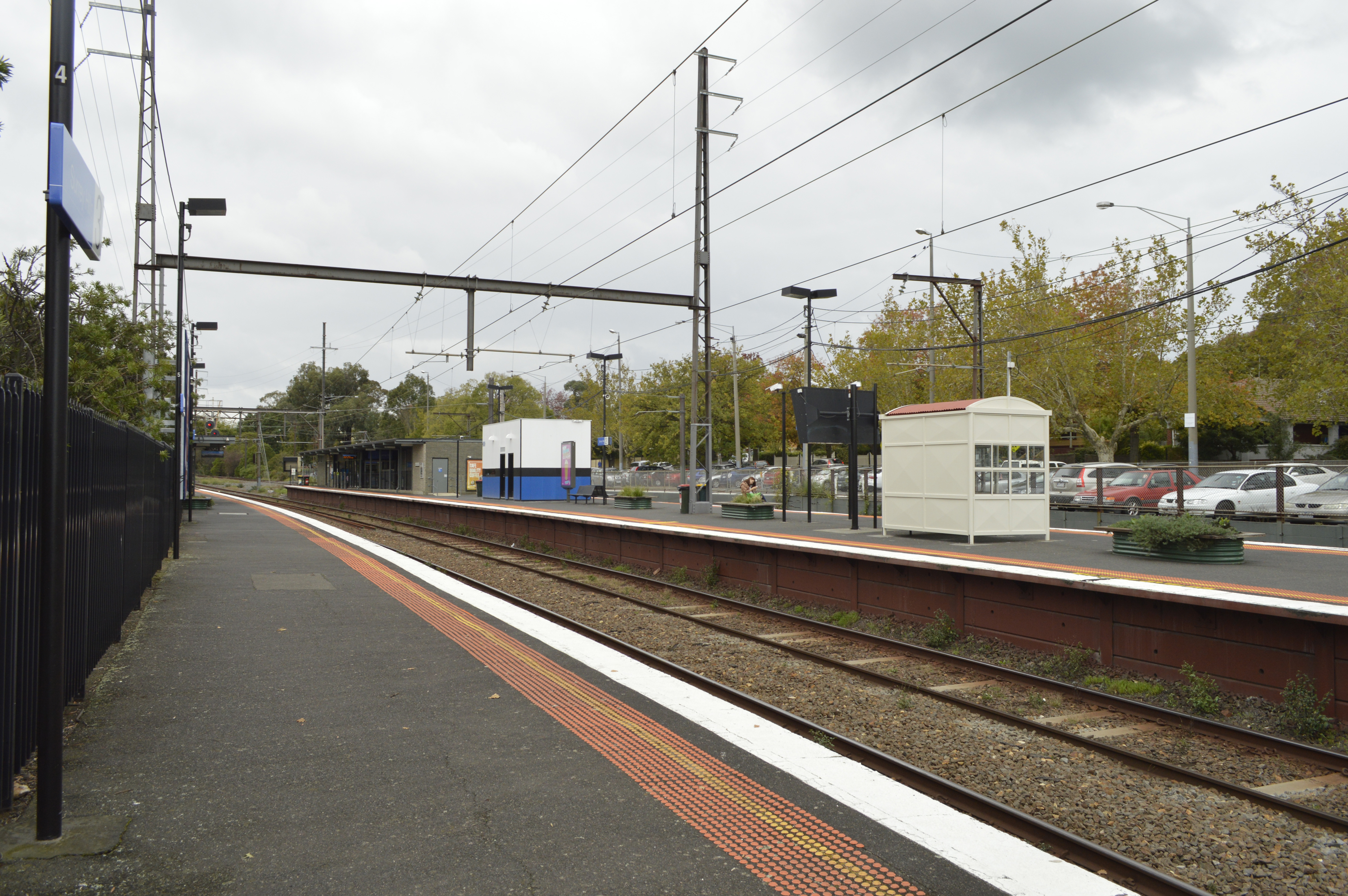
Surrey Hills railway station in Melbourne, Victoria.

In response to the report the Labor Party said that all funding should have a legitimate process and called the scheme "sports rorts on steroids". Josh Burns said that in his electorate there was a site on the list in Balaclava that had already been set aside by the council for social housing, so could not be used for car parking, and that the council was not informed of the government's decision. Shadow minister for infrastructure, Andrew Giles called it a "desperate attempt to save a marginal seat."

One of the projects in Josh Frydenberg's electorate of Kooyong was set to be built in Surrey Hills, even though the station there was scheduled to be closed by the state government.

It was noted that 77% of the projects were in Liberal held seats, while a further 10% were in electorates where the Liberal candidate's views were canvassed.

In the days following the report, experts were saying that infrastructure funding should have been concentrated more around Melbourne's western suburbs, while all the Melbourne projects were concentrated in the south and east. The west contained Melbourne's most congested roads and the car parks were not being put where they were needed.

The projects were selected in private and announced by press release with electorates disproportionately favoured including Kooyong with 4 projects, Goldstein with 6 and La Trobe with 5, with most of the sites being chosen by Angus Taylor and Josh Frydenberg.

An investigation of the projects that had been completed showed that the Berwick project cost over three times the benchmark price at almost $115,000 per space. Stuart Norman from Parking Australia said that there was no logical reason for the costs to blow out to such a significant degree.

In August, the Glen Eira decided to go back to consultation to decide whether to accept the money or not, calling the money 'tainted'. In September, the Bayside council took similar steps to set up a consultation to determine if they wanted to accept the money from the government. Both Glen Eira and Bayside are in the Division of Goldstein, which was held by Tim Wilson of the Liberal party until the 2022 election.

== See also ==
- List of political controversies in Australia
