= Utegate =

2009 controversy in Australian federal politics

Utegate (also known as the OzCar affair) refers to a 2009 controversy in Australian federal politics, revolving around fabricated allegations made by then Federal Leader of the Opposition and Liberal leader, Malcolm Turnbull, that the Prime Minister, Kevin Rudd, and/or the Treasurer, Wayne Swan, had acted improperly on behalf of a Queensland car dealer who was seeking financial assistance from a government agency called OzCar, and that they had misled Parliament. Central to this claim was evidence by Treasury official Godwin Grech before a Senate inquiry in June 2009 that a Prime Ministerial adviser had emailed him asking for preferential treatment for the dealer. When the email's text became known, the Prime Minister labelled the email a forgery, and a subsequent police investigation confirmed that the email was never sent. On 4 August 2009, Grech admitted to forging the email. The Auditor-General was also ordered to conduct an investigation. It found no evidence of corruption by the Prime Minister or the Treasurer or their respective offices, but did make adverse findings against Grech, and highlighted numerous administrative failings in the Treasury.

== Background ==
In 2007 John Grant, a Brisbane businessman, donated a white 1996 Mazda Bravo pickup truck (known in Australia as a "ute") to Kevin Rudd's campaign for use as a mobile electorate office during the 2007 federal election. Grant, a friend and neighbour of Rudd, is the proprietor of John Grant Motors in Ipswich, a provincial centre 40 kilometres (25 mi) southwest of Brisbane. Rudd accepted the donation and reported it on his pecuniary interests register.

In February 2009, Grant made an inquiry to Bernie Ripoll, the Labor member of the House of Representatives for Oxley which covers Ipswich, about possibly obtaining financial assistance for his car dealership under OzCar, a proposed government funding scheme for car dealerships that had lost access to financing as a result of the 2008 financial crisis.

On 4 June 2009, Malcolm Turnbull alleged that Rudd's office had contacted the Treasury in order to obtain preferential treatment for Grant. Turnbull also alleged that Wayne Swan had been acting on behalf of Grant. Rudd and Swan denied the allegations. Godwin Grech, the Treasury official in charge of the OzCar scheme, also gave evidence to a Senate committee hearing that day. It was later alleged in the media that Turnbull and Senator Eric Abetz subsequently met with Grech.

== Senate inquiry ==
On 15 June 2009, during Question Time in the House of Representatives, Rudd denied that his office had ever contacted OzCar on behalf of Grant. Swan acknowledged that his office referred Grant to the department administering the program, but denied he had advocated on his behalf.

The following day, Senator Eric Abetz (Liberal, Tasmania) moved that an inquiry into the OzCar scheme be conducted by the Senate Economics Legislation Committee and that, "the Committee should hear evidence from relevant bodies and individuals, including the Department of Treasury, about the operation and management of the proposed OzCar scheme." The inquiry was not initially related to investigating alleged improper dealings, but to examine the costs of the OzCar scheme and whether the parameters of the scheme's operation had changed from its original purpose.

The Senate inquiry convened on 19 June 2009. Grech testified that he had a "recollection" that a member of Rudd's staff, Dr Andrew Charlton, had sent him an email in February, asking that he provide preferential treatment concerning Ozcar to Grant.

Under questioning by Abetz, Grech said: "It was certainly my understanding that the initial contact I had with respect to John Grant was from the Prime Minister's office. My recollection may well be totally false and faulty – but my recollection, big qualification – is that there was a short email from the PMO [Prime Minister's Office] to me which very simply alerted me to the case of John Grant. But I don't have the email."

Abetz then read out the text of what he said was an email, which purported to ask for preferential treatment for Grant. Grech also stated he arranged for Ford Credit to talk to Grant, in response to prompting from the Treasurer's office.

A Ford Credit executive also appeared before the inquiry, and stated that Grech provided him with Grant's mobile phone number during a meeting in February 2009. The day after this meeting Ford Credit contacted Grant by phone and was not provided with phone numbers of any other dealers, and stated that Grant was the only dealer "substantially discussed". It was also stated that Ford Credit would not normally look after Kia dealers such as Grant.

== Corruption allegations ==
After the hearing on 19 June, Turnbull accused Rudd of corrupt conduct and lying to Parliament, since Rudd had previously denied in Parliament doing any favours for Grant. Turnbull stated, "The Prime Minister and the Treasurer have used their offices and taxpayers' resources to seek advantage for one of their mates and then lied about it to the Parliament".

The text of the email mentioned by Grech was widely published in Australian newspapers on 20 June 2009.

Hi Godwin, the PM has asked if the car dealer financing vehicle is available to assist a Queenslander dealership, John Grant Motors, who seems to be having trouble getting finance. If you can follow up on this asap that would be very useful. Happy to discuss. A.

— Forged email that was purportedly sent by Prime Ministerial Advisor Andrew Charlton on 19 February 2009

Also on 20 June, Charlton denied ever having sent Grech an email about Grant. Rudd instructed the Auditor-General, Ian McPhee, to investigate the allegations, as well as instructing the Australian Federal Police to launch an investigation. Rudd repeated his denial of intervening on behalf of Grant and insisted the email mentioned by Grech did not exist. Rudd also demanded Turnbull's resignation, accusing him of using falsified evidence. Swan stated that although he had passed Grant's details on to Treasury, he had done the same for numerous other car dealerships, and that Grant did not receive special treatment.

=== Discovery of email ===
On 22 June, the majority of Question Time in the House of Representatives was devoted to the "OzCar affair." At the same time, Australian Federal Police raided Grech's home and found the original email. Forensic examination revealed the email was a forgery, and that it had originated within the Treasury Department and not the Prime Minister's office. Grech, in his response to the Auditor-General's report, indicated that he had been advised by a senior Treasury officer that an IT system failure in Treasury had meant that searches for emails received by Treasury on 19 February 2009 were not likely to be successful. Previous searches for emails about OzCar conducted by Treasury also failed to discover the fake email created by Mr Grech, or any record of the fake email being sent to Mr Grech's home account.

It remained unclear whether Grech was under suspicion of forging the email himself, or whether he had been the innocent victim of a forgery "scam" designed to incriminate Rudd. Rudd repeated his demand that Turnbull apologise and resign, a demand which Turnbull resisted.

On the evening of 22 June, Swan released 22 emails, intended to demonstrate that the treatment received by Grant was not substantially different from the treatment received by other car dealers.

On 23 June, Turnbull admitted that there was no substance to his allegations against Rudd, but insisted he (Turnbull) had conducted himself in an appropriate manner. Turnbull also maintained that the allegations against Swan had yet to be resolved.

On 4 August 2009, Grech admitted that he had forged the email. He claimed that he believed a real email with similar content had been sent from Prime Minister Rudd's office, however conceded that this had not actually been found.

== Political impact ==
The week after the events in Parliament, several opinion polls appeared simultaneously, all showing a drop in Turnbull's approval rating, and a rise in Rudd's approval rating. According to Newspoll, published in The Australian, Turnbull's approval rating suffered the single biggest fall in the survey's 25-year history, while Rudd's preferred rating increased from 57 to 65 per cent. A Galaxy poll in News Limited newspapers also showed Turnbull's support falling.

Commentators attributed these poll results to the OzCar affair. "Malcolm Turnbull's darkest hours as Opposition Leader is upon him with a new poll showing his standing has been dealt a hammer blow by the OzCar affair," wrote Phillip Coorey, chief political correspondent of the Sydney Morning Herald. "The Coalition and Malcolm Turnbull have received a devastating blow from the OzCar affair," said Michelle Grattan in The Age.

The polls also asked specific questions about the OzCar affair. According to Newspoll, voters, by a ratio of two to one, did not believe that Grant had received preferential treatment. 52 per cent said they did not believe Turnbull's claims, while only 24 per cent said they thought they were true. Newspoll also showed a large drop in the number of voters who thought Turnbull trustworthy, and an increase in those who thought him arrogant.

== Adverse findings in auditor-general's report ==
The auditor-general cleared the Prime Minister and Treasurer of any wrongdoing, but made a range of adverse findings about Godwin Grech and Treasury.

=== Godwin Grech ===
In relation to Godwin Grech, the auditor-general found that his inquiry into the implementation of the OzCar scheme "raised serious questions as to whether the code of conduct has been breached by Mr Grech." Allegations made in the report against Grech included improper use of confidential information, inappropriate email communications and interactions, and preferential treatment to one applicant based on Grech's belief that they were a supporter of and donor to the Liberal Party.

=== Treasury ===
In relation to Treasury, the auditor-general found that:

- it did not develop any contingency arrangements for how to address the identified wholesale car finance market failure if there was a substantial delay in OzCar
- it did not maintain accurate records
- certain representations by dealers were treated differently from other dealers
- during the procurement processes used for OzCar, Treasury did not record the circumstances that led to the decision to direct source of certain supplies
- it did not make records about as to how the parties that were direct-sourced were identified as being the only party to be approached
- it agreed to various engagements before it had obtained a quote or estimate from the contractor and this seriously weakened the Commonwealth's negotiating position and provided little comfort that the Commonwealth was receiving value for money in agreeing to the contractual arrangements
- once a quote or estimate was obtained, Treasury did not document the basis on which it was satisfied that the engagement terms represented value for money
- it gave insufficient priority to documenting the engagement terms, resulting in extended delays in contracts being prepared and signed, and
- it did not promote accountability and transparency for these procurements, with only one of the procurements published on AusTender.

== Aftermath ==
A Senate committee, which reported in November 2009, cleared Grech of charges of contempt, but its report contained the text of hundreds of emails between Grech and third parties, and suggested Grech had been critical in briefing Steve Lewis of the Daily Telegraph about the allegations, and had extensive communication with Liberal Party figures including Turnbull himself.

Turnbull's leadership ratings in the opinion polls never recovered from the affair, and on 1 December 2009, he was defeated in a party-room ballot by Tony Abbott as leader of the Liberal Party.

The ute which Grant lent to Rudd was donated to the Queensland Museum in 2010.

== See also ==
- List of Australian political controversies
- List of scandals with "-gate" suffix
