= Emmanuel College, Melbourne =

Emmanuel College

Location
- Altona North and Point Cook; Melbourne, Victoria, 3030; Australia; 37°49′56″S 144°50′30″E

Information
- Former name: St. Paul's College
- Type: Private comprehensive co-educational secondary day school
- Motto: Life to the Full
- Religious affiliation: Marianists
- Denomination: Roman Catholic
- Established: 1965; 61 years ago (as St Paul's College); 2008; 18 years ago (as Emmanuel College)
- Principal: Janine Biggin
- Years: 7–12
- Years taught: 7–12
- Gender: Co-educational (Notre Dame Campus) All boys (St. Paul's Campus)
- Enrolment: 2,498 (as of 2024)
- Colours: Red and sky blue
- Affiliation: Associated Catholic Colleges
- Website: www.ecmelb.catholic.edu.au

Emmanuel College, formerly St. Paul's College, is a dual-campus private Roman Catholic comprehensive co-educational secondary day school, occupying campuses in Altona North and Point Cook, in the south-western suburbs of Melbourne, Victoria, Australia.

== History ==
Emblem for St. Paul's Campus prior to becoming Emmanuel College

=== Establishment ===
St. Paul's Campus was originally established as 'St. Paul's College' in 1965, under the auspices of the American Order of the Society of Marianists. The order had been invited to establish this Catholic Secondary Boys' College by the then Archbishop of Melbourne, Daniel Mannix. The college's colours were then red, white and blue and its motto was Ecce Mater Tua (Latin: "Behold Thy Mother").

In 2008, the school opened a second campus at Point Cook called Notre Dame.

=== Building construction ===
==== St Pauls campus ====
In the early 1960s, the local parish priests purchased a large, 9-hectare, undeveloped block in Altona North. The parents of the school's initial students helped to build and landscape the school in the early years. The college's primary edifice, the three-storey building called the "Jubilee Building", was completed in 1969. Following to be completed were:

- The Chaminade Library in 1971.
- The Art/Craft/Science Lab and the senior classrooms known as the "Winters Building" in 1979.
- The administrative complex and gymnasium in 1982.

The Jubilee Building was extensively renovated in 1998. In 2004, with the assistance of a Commonwealth Government grant, work commenced on enlarging the library complex and the building of two new computer labs. These developments were completed in 2005. In 2009–2010 three more developments were in place. These were the expansion of the Technology Building, construction of a new canteen, gym, changing rooms and toilets and the new McMahon Language Centre. These projects were funded by the National Building Stimulus Grant.

==== Notre Dame campus ====
Construction of the Notre Dame Campus in Point Cook commenced in mid-2007, with campus opening in 2008. The initial intake was restricted to year seven students, with construction continuing as further year levels commenced. The first group of year 12 students graduated from the Notre Dame campus in 2013.

=== Transition to Emmanuel College ===
In 2006, the plans for the transition to Emmanuel College and the future of the school were commenced. 2008 saw the full transition from 'St. Paul's College' to 'Emmanuel College' with the acquisition of a second co-educational campus. The school eventually incorporated a new emblem and changed its motto to Life To The Full, which comes from the Gospel according to John: "I have come that they may have life and have it to the full" (John 10:10).

== Principal and current staff ==
Beginning in 1997, the principal at the St. Paul's campus was Christopher Stock. In 2008 when the transition to Emmanuel College was complete, Stock became the principal of Emmanuel College with responsibility for the St. Paul's and the Notre Dame campuses. Stock retired in 2022, after dedicating 26 years as Principal. He is the longest serving Principal in the history of Emmanuel College.

Since 2023, the principal is Dr. Janine Biggin. She received media attention for introducing a ban on mullets and dreadlocks, sparking allegations of racism within the school.

== House and homeroom system ==
The Emmanuel College house system consists of five houses:

- McCoy (Navy)
- Cassidy (Red)
- McCluskey (Yellow)
- Winters (Green)
- Chaminade (Sky blue)

These houses are named after the Marianists that initially helped serve and found the school, and Father John Cassidy of St Mary's Parish, Williamstown, who was involved in the establishment of the college. The exception is Chaminade, which is named after William Chaminade, the founder of The Marianist order. Both the St Paul's and Notre Dame campuses have homerooms with about 25–30 students, ranging from years 7–12.

Prior to this, the previous St. Paul's College had four houses named after sporting athletes:

- Fraser (Red)
- Laver (Blue)
- Elliott (Yellow)
- Bradman (Green)

== Victorian Certificate of Education (VCE) ==
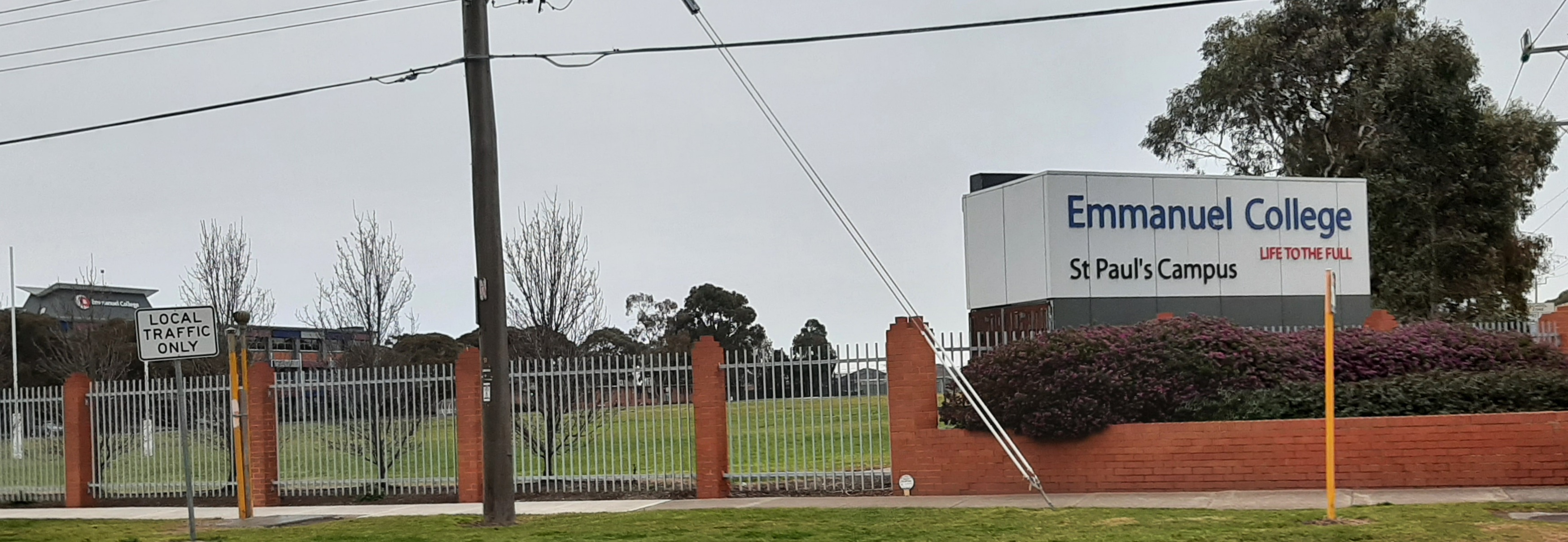
School sign, Blackshaws Road, Altona North

Emmanuel College has offered the VCE program at the St. Paul's Campus since its implementation in 1990. The school tends to perform well in the VCE, with a student achieving an ATAR score of 99.15 in 2019, the highest ATAR of the school thus far.

== Sport ==
Emmanuel is a member of the Sports Association of Catholic Co-educational Secondary Schools (SACCSS) and the Associated Catholic Colleges (ACC).

=== ACC premierships ===
Emmanuel has won the following ACC premierships.

- Golf – 2021
- Soccer (2) – 2010, 2014
- Senior Cricket 2025
- Senior Tennis 2025
- Senior AFL 2026

== Notable alumni ==
- Jordan Bos, football player for Feyenoord
- Jason Duff, hockey player
- Daniel Giansiracusa, former AFL player
- Godwin Grech, former public servant
- Mangok Mathiang (born 1992), Australian-Sudanese basketball player for Hapoel Eilat of the Israeli Basketball Premier League, former NBA player
- Mick Martyn, former AFL player
- Trent McKenzie, Former AFL player for Gold Coast Suns and Port Adelaide
- James Podsiadly, former AFL player
- Antonio Sagona, archaeologist and University of Melbourne professor
- Bill Sheahan, cricket umpire
- Rohan Smith, former AFL player
- Cooper Burns, Kookaburras hockey player
- Joshua Dale Brown, Convicted Paedophile

== Controversies ==
=== Muck Up Day Goats ===
In 2015, Emmanuel College's Point Cook Campus (known as Notre Dame Campus) was at the centre of an animal rights abuse case where as part of the school's Muck Up Day celebrations, two goats were brought into the school and painted. This led to Wyndham Council being called, as well as the RSPCA to take the goats away. A RSPCA representative called this behaviour "abhorrent".

=== Verbal Abuse Scandals ===
In 2020 and 2021, a video began circulating around of a female teacher hurling racial slurs at a student at Emmanuel College's Point Cook Campus. This teacher was later moved to their St Paul's Campus, however she no longer works at the school. There was also another incident at this time where a teacher allegedly said racial slurs on a zoom call, however as yet, no evidence of this has been found. These are unrelated to a popular male teacher who cracked at a student in 2018, with footage resurfacing in 2021, as this has been excused by all involved.

=== Peter Coceani ===
Peter Coceani was a teacher at Emmanuel College's Altona North (St Paul's) Campus fired at the end of 2020 and suspended by the Victorian Institute of Teaching for six child sexual assault charges at a previous school, which he was then convicted of in 2023.

=== Joshua Brown ===
Whilst Joshua Brown was at Emmanuel College, he was accused of sexually harassing a younger student in a school toilet during his final year. He is most notorious for being a convicted paedophile, sexually abusing over 1200 children over an 8-year period across various childcare centres in Melbourne's western suburbs. While the school has denied any association with the criminal, a witness has said that he did in fact sexually harass a student at the school.

== See also ==
- Mount St. Joseph Girls' College
- List of schools in Victoria
- Education in Victoria
