= Michelle Rowland =

Australian politician (born 1971)

The Honourable Michelle Rowland MP
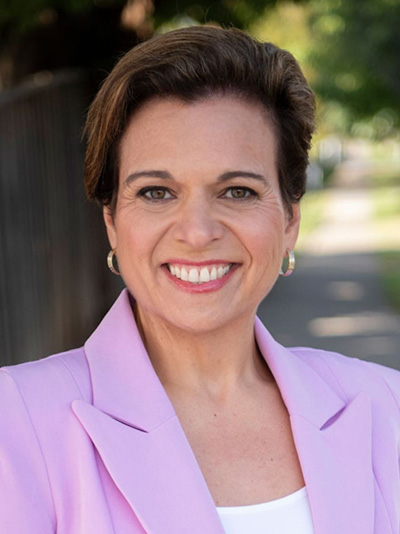
- Official portrait, 2022

Attorney-General of Australia
- Incumbent
- Assumed office 13 May 2025
- Prime Minister: Anthony Albanese
- Preceded by: Mark Dreyfus

Minister for Communications
- In office 1 June 2022 – 13 May 2025
- Prime Minister: Anthony Albanese
- Preceded by: Paul Fletcher
- Succeeded by: Anika Wells

Member of the Australian Parliament for Greenway
- Incumbent
- Assumed office 21 August 2010
- Preceded by: Louise Markus
Other offices held
President of the New South Wales Labor Party
In office 2021–2024
| Leader | Chris Minns |
| General Secretary | Bob Nanva; Dominic Offner |
| Preceded by | Mark Lennon |
| Succeeded by | Tricia Kavanagh |
Deputy Mayor of Blacktown
In office September 2007 – 13 September 2008
| Mayor | Leo Kelly |
| Preceded by | Edmond Atalla |
| Succeeded by | Alan Pendleton |
Councillor of Blacktown City Council for Second Ward
In office 23 March 2004 – 13 September 2008

Personal details
- Born: 16 November 1971 (age 55) Blacktown, New South Wales, Australia
- Party: Labor
- Spouse: Michael Chaaya
- Education: University of Sydney
- Occupation: Lawyer; politician
- Website: www.michellerowland.com.au

Michelle Anne Rowland (born 16 November 1971) is an Australian politician and lawyer. She has served as the Attorney-General of Australia in the second Albanese ministry since 13 May 2025. She is a member of the Australian Labor Party (ALP) and has represented the Division of Greenway in the House of Representatives since 2010. She was a member of the shadow ministry from 2013 to 2022, and was elected President of the New South Wales Labor Party in October 2021. She was previously the Minister for Communications from 2022 to 2025 in the first Albanese ministry.

== Early years and background ==
Rowland was born on 16 November 1971 in Blacktown in Sydney. Her mother is Fijian, but she does not hold dual citizenship as the Fijian constitution at the time did not allow for citizenship to pass through the maternal line. She was raised in Seven Hills. She was educated at Our Lady of Mercy College, Parramatta and the University of Sydney. Rowland was a senior telecommunications lawyer with law firm Gilbert + Tobin in Sydney. She lives in the electorate at Glenwood. Rowland was a Director of the Western Sydney Area Health Service from 2000 to 2004 and is a former local councillor (Ward 2, 2004–2008) and deputy mayor of Blacktown (2007–2008).

== Federal politics ==
At the 2010 Australian federal election, Rowland won the Australian House of Representatives seat of Greenway for Labor, following the 2009 electoral distribution which had made Greenway notionally Labor, on a margin of 5.7 points. The seat was previously held by Liberal Louise Markus, who contested the more marginal seat of Macquarie at the 2010 federal election. Rowland was re-elected to the seat at the 2013 federal election with an increased majority, and was also subsequently appointed to the Labor opposition's frontbench as Shadow Assistant Minister for Communications as well as Shadow Minister for Citizenship and Multiculturalism. In October 2015, Rowland was elevated to Shadow Minister for Small Business as well as continuing as Shadow Minister for Citizenship and Multiculturalism.

In the lead-up to the 2013 federal election, campaign opinion polls had shown that she would lose Greenway. However, her subsequent victory was helped during the campaign by the high-profile blunder of the Liberal Party candidate Jaymes Diaz, when he could not state clearly the Coalition's policy on asylum seekers.

=== Shadow minister ===
Following the ALP's defeat at the 2013 election, Rowland was appointed to Bill Shorten's Shadow Ministry. Rowland has held the portfolios of Shadow Assistant Minister for Communications (2013–2015), Shadow Minister for Citizenship and Multiculturalism (2013–2016), Shadow Minister for Small Business (2015–2016), and Shadow Minister for Communications (2016–2019). She was elevated to the shadow Cabinet in 2016, and maintained her place following Anthony Albanese's election as party leader in 2019.

Rowland was elected President of the Australian Labor Party (NSW Branch) at the NSW State Conference on 9 October 2021.

=== Minister ===
On 10 September 2024, Albanese and Rowland confirmed that the federal government would introduce legislation – later passed into law as the Online Safety Amendment (Social Media Minimum Age) Act 2024 – to enforce a minimum age for access to social media and other relevant digital platforms. The federal government would also work with states and territorial governments to develop a uniform framework. Albanese said that the legislation was intended to safeguard the safety and mental and physical health of young people while Rowland said that the proposed legislation would hold big tech to account for harmful online environments and social media addiction among children.

Following the 2025 federal election, Rowland was promoted to succeed Mark Dreyfus as the Attorney-General of Australia on 13 May 2025.

In March 2026, following a wider controversy over parliamentarians' travel expenses, Rowland was found by the Independent Parliamentary Expenses Authority (IPEA) to have breached guidelines in relation to an expense claim for family members' flights in 2023. She repaid $8,000 and was issued a penalty of $2,000 by IPEA for the breach.

== Political positions ==
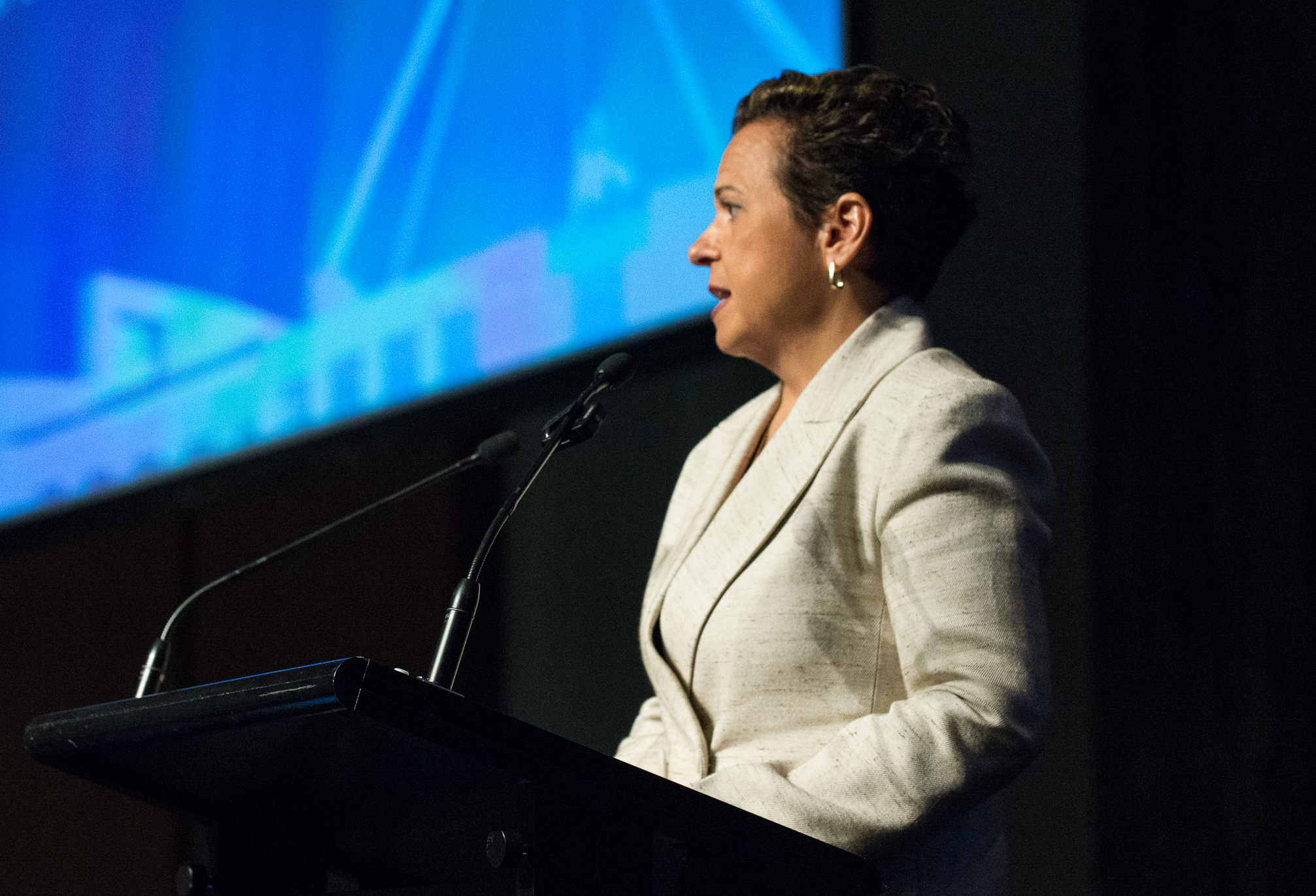
Minister Rowland speaking to guests at the 34th Australian National Prayer Breakfast, Canberra, November 2023

Rowland is a member of Labor Right.

In 2012, Rowland was one of 98 MPs that voted against a bill for same-sex marriage, but supported its introduction from 2016. Despite the 2017 Australian Marriage Law postal survey returning a 53.6% no vote for her electorate of Greenway, Rowland voted for the bill that enacted same-sex marriage in Australia. This was in line with her longstanding position and the national success of the Yes vote, with Rowland declaring: "Personally, a conversation I had with a mother in Seven Hills provided me with an important perspective. Her son is on active service in the Australian navy and he wants to marry his partner. This man is putting his life on the line in service to Australia. Who am I, and who is any person, to say that this man should not be entitled to marry the person he loves?".

In 2021, Rowland was the most vocal critic inside the Labor caucus of its capital gains tax, negative gearing, and income tax policies, seeing all three dropped.

== Personal life ==
Rowland is married to Michael Chaaya, with whom she is raising their two daughters, Octavia and Aurelia. The family lives in Glenwood, one of the most religious, and most ethnically diverse, communities in Australia. Rowland and her family are Catholic Christians.

== Notes ==
Civic offices
| Preceded by Edmond Atalla | Deputy Mayor of Blacktown; 2007–2008 | Succeeded by Alan Pendleton |
Parliament of Australia
| Preceded by Louise Markus | Member for Greenway; 2010–present | Incumbent |
Party political offices
| Preceded by Mark Lennon | President of the Australian Labor Party (NSW Branch); 2021–2024 | Succeeded by Tricia Kavanagh |
Political offices
| Preceded by Mark Dreyfus | Attorney-General of Australia; 2025–present | Incumbent |
| Preceded by Paul Fletcher | Minister for Communications; 2022–2025 | Succeeded by Anika Wells |
