= Lorenzo Gamboa =

Filipino-American barred from Australia

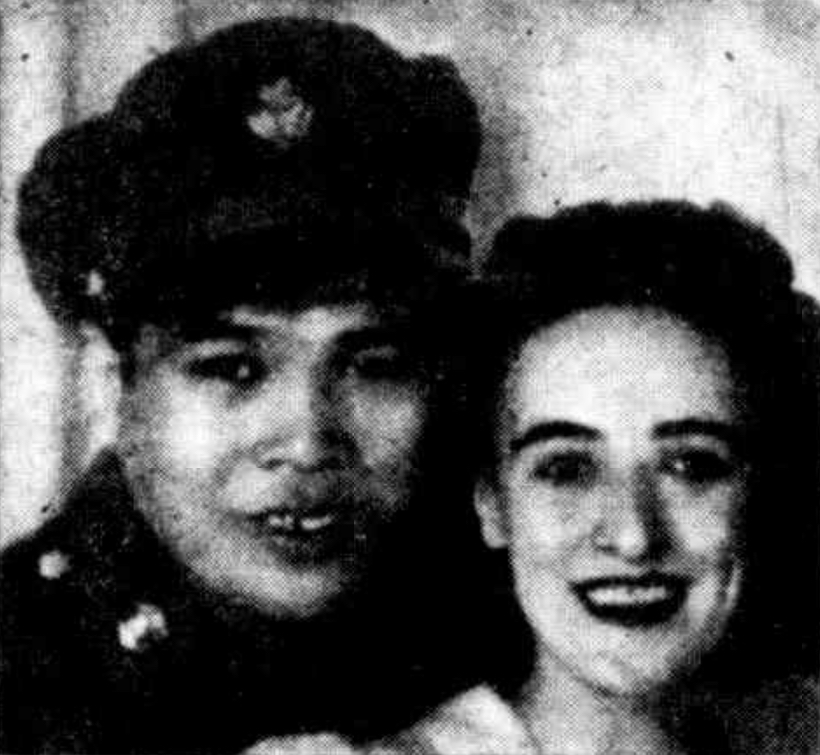
- Lorenzo and Joyce Gamboa, 1943

Personal details
- Born: 11 November 1918 Mangaldan, Pangasinan, Philippines
- Died: 25 September 2012 (aged 93) Australia
- Citizenship: Philippines; United States (from 1946)
- Spouse: Joyce Cain (m. 1943; died 2004)
- Known for: Target of the White Australia policy

Military service
- Allegiance: United States
- Branch/service: United States Army
- Years of service: 1941–1945; 1946–1952
- Rank: Sergeant
- Battles/wars: World War II: Battle of the Philippines; New Guinea campaign; Liberation of the Philippines; Occupation of Japan

Lorenzo Abrogar Gamboa (11 November 1918 – 25 September 2012) was a Filipino-American man who was excluded from Australia under the White Australia policy, despite having an Australian wife and children. His treatment sparked an international incident with the Philippines.

Gamboa enlisted in the United States Army in 1941, and was evacuated to Australia the following year after the Japanese invasion of the Philippines. He married an Australian woman, Joyce Cain, and fathered two children, both born while he was serving overseas. He was discharged from the U.S. Army in 1945 and joined his family in Australia, but was refused permission to settle permanently and forced to leave the country. Gamboa became a naturalised U.S. citizen in 1946 and rejoined the army. He applied to re-enter Australia in 1948, but was refused even a visitor's visa. Immigration Minister Arthur Calwell stated that allowing Gamboa into the country would promote miscegenation, and granting an exception because of his U.S. citizenship would force the government to allow in racially undesirable groups such as African-Americans.

In 1949, following Gamboa's chance encounter with journalist Denis Warner, the Australian media began to criticise Calwell's handling of the issue and pressed for Gamboa to be allowed to reunite with his family. The "Gamboa case" sparked outrage in the Philippines. President Elpidio Quirino said that Filipinos had been "deeply humiliated" by the Australian government's actions, and the Philippine House of Representatives passed a bill that would have banned Australians from the country. After a change of government at the 1949 federal election, the new immigration minister Harold Holt overturned Calwell's decision and allowed Gamboa to rejoin his family; he settled permanently in Australia in 1952. The incident had a lasting impact on Australia–Philippines relations.

== Early life ==
Gamboa was born on 11 November 1918 in Mangaldan, Pangasinan. He left school at the age of 16 to work in a coal mine, while also studying electrical engineering at night school. After the passage of the National Defense Act of 1935, he had to complete compulsory military training every year. Gamboa was a talented boxer, and in 1940 won a boxing competition that had a scholarship to National University as its prize. He did not meet the educational requirements for the scholarship, and so began attending night classes to complete his secondary education. His entrance to university was interrupted by the outbreak of the Pacific War.

In late 1941, Gamboa enlisted in the United States Army. He was immediately caught up in the Battle of the Philippines, narrowly escaping a Japanese bombing raid before being hospitalised with a hernia a few weeks later. He left the country on 31 December aboard the hospital ship Mactan, again narrowly escaping a bombing attack while his ship was in the harbour. He was sent to Australia via Celebes, arriving in Darwin on 13 January 1942. He was subsequently moved on to Melbourne and housed in a military camp at Royal Park, while working as a guard at the Port of Melbourne.

Gamboa rejoined the U.S. Army in July 1942. He was posted to Port Moresby, New Guinea, a few months later, and served as an orderly for General Douglas MacArthur. He was then attached to MacArthur's headquarters in Brisbane. In 1944, he returned to the Philippines with the army, and was stationed in Leyte for a period. He visited his mother in March 1945, who did not recognise him; he had been listed as missing in action and was presumed dead. Gamboa arrived in Yokohama in August 1945, to take part in the occupation of Japan. His term of service expired in November 1945 and he opted to be discharged in Australia to rejoin his family.

== Marriage and children ==
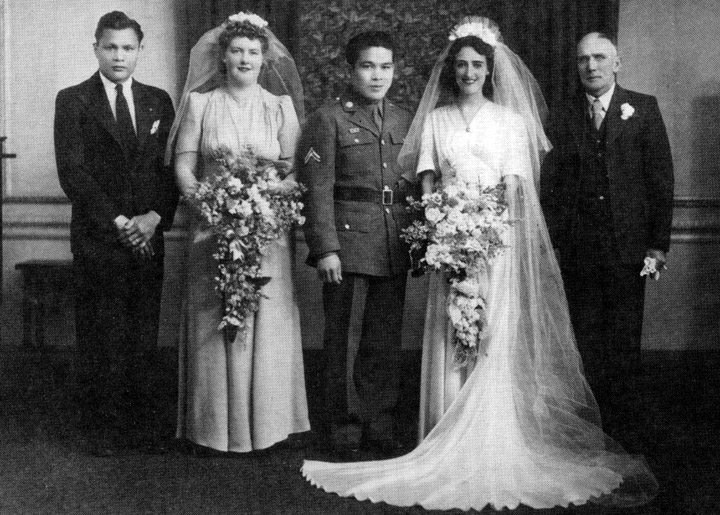
Gamboa married Joyce Cain in Melbourne on 9 October 1943.

In March 1942, Gamboa was taking a train back to his barracks when he met Joyce Cain, a 16-year-old Australian girl who worked at a biscuit factory. She invited him back to her parents' home in Brunswick West, at the time a common gesture of goodwill towards soldiers. They subsequently began dating. Joyce later recounted that her family and friends had been overwhelmingly accepting of their relationship, as mixed-race couples were not uncommon in war-time Melbourne. The couple became engaged in August 1942 and married on 9 October 1943, spending their honeymoon at a hotel. Their first child, Raymond, was born in Melbourne in November 1944, when Gamboa was stationed in Leyte. A second child, Julie, was born in Melbourne in January 1947, when he was stationed in Tokyo.

== Immigration issues ==
After being discharged from the army in 1945, Gamboa's father-in-law found him work with the Victorian Railways, and he settled in Melbourne to live with his wife and son. His continued presence was discovered by the Department of Immigration in early 1946, after he attempted to collect a ration book, and he was subsequently given three months to leave the country. He left for the United States in June 1946, travelling alongside Australian war brides joining their non-white American husbands. On arrival in the U.S., Gamboa was detained for entering the country without a passport. His military service entitled him to American citizenship, which he adopted on 26 July 1946. He subsequently re-enlisted in the U.S. Army and was posted back to Japan, joining General MacArthur's headquarters in Tokyo.

Gamboa applied to re-enter Australia in October 1948, hoping to return to his family after his discharge in August 1949. His preference was for permanent residence, but he also applied for a tourist visa as a back-up; he assumed that as a U.S. citizen he would not face the same difficulties as before. However, the Department of Immigration informed the Australian Mission in Tokyo that he would not be allowed to enter the country at all, as he was non-white and his case would be a precedent for other Asian war evacuees to remain in Australia. In early 1949, Gamboa encountered Australian Associated Press journalist Denis Warner while waiting in an army post office in Tokyo. Warner's article about the case sparked a media frenzy, with coverage in popular daily newspapers and weekly magazines overwhelmingly sympathetic to the Gamboas and hostile to the government. Lorenzo was quoted as asking "why did they let me marry an Australian girl if they wouldn't let me into the country to see her?".

=== Resolution ===
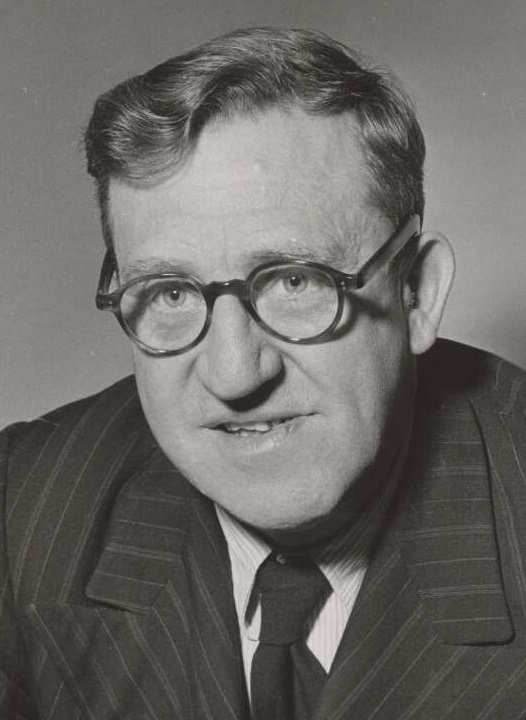
Arthur Calwell, Australian Minister for Immigration 1941–1949

The media coverage of the Gamboa case and other similar cases made the government's immigration policy an issue in the lead-up to the 1949 federal election. Calwell defended his actions during a campaign rally at the Brunswick Town Hall in November 1949, stating "there is nothing wrong with the Labor Party's administration of the White Australia policy". He said "I am sure we don't want half-castes running over our country", and told the audience that "if we let in any U.S. citizen, we will have to admit U.S. Negroes [...] I don't think mothers and fathers would want to see that". He believed that allowing compassionate exceptions to the White Australia policy would lead to a slippery slope in which thousands of other non-white immigrants would be allowed entry. The same reasoning was behind the passage of the War-time Refugees Removal Act 1949, which allowed the government to deport non-whites who had entered Australia as refugees during the war.

The government was not only accused of cruelty towards the Gamboas, but also of endangering the White Australia policy through an overly heavy-handed approach that was likely to antagonise Asian countries. Opposition Leader Robert Menzies attacked the immigration department's "singularly unpleasant process of victimisation", but reaffirmed the basic principles of the White Australia policy. In March 1949, two Filipino golfers arrived in Australia to play in a tournament in Sydney. Harold Holt, the opposition spokesman for immigration, accused the government of hypocrisy, observing in parliament that "it is incredible that Filipino golfers are on a golfing tour of Australia while Minister for Immigration Mr. Calwell is keeping out one of their own countrymen who wants to discuss the future with his wife". He accused Calwell of adopting a "pig-headed and inhuman stand".

At the election, Calwell's Labor Party was defeated by Holt's Liberal Party. Holt was subsequently appointed as the new Minister for Immigration in the Menzies Government. Two days after the election, in December 1949, he cabled Joyce Gamboa and told her that her husband would be allowed to settle in Australia; an official announcement was made in February 1950. As he was still on a tour of duty with the U.S. Army, he did not actually return to Australia until December 1951, and did not permanently return until early 1952.

=== Reaction in the Philippines ===
Australia and the Philippines were on friendly terms after the end of World War II, and President Elpidio Quirino sought out Australia as a potential regional partner, hoping to lessen his country's dependence on the United States. However, the relationship between the two countries was severely damaged when the Australian government's treatment of Gamboa was made public. In April 1949, President Quirino expressed his disappointment "that our neighbour, to whom we looked for friendship, should exclude us because of our colour", and stated that "we, the people of the Philippines, have been deeply humiliated". The Department of Foreign Affairs revoked its Australian consulate's authority to issue visas, forcing potential Australian visitors to seek a visa on arrival. Author Hal Porter was subjected to a six-hour visa interview, in which he was asked his opinions of the Gamboa case and the White Australia policy. Keith Waller, the Australian Consul-General in Manila, received death threats.

In March 1949, Congressman Hermenegildo Atienza introduced House Bill No. 2613 (the "Reciprocity Immigration Bill") into the Philippine House of Representatives, which would have banned Australians from entering the country. His colleague Domingo Paguirigan put forward a motion calling on President Quirino to close the country's consulate in Sydney. In the ensuing debate, Cipriano Primicias called Australians "the biggest hypocrites in the world", and said that the Philippines should invade Australia to preserve its honour. Atienza's bill was passed by the House of Representatives on 27 April. The Senate added an amendment exempting Australian wives of Filipino citizens, but a sudden adjournment prevented a final vote on the bill. It had not been revived by the time Calwell's decision was overturned, and subsequently lapsed.

Australian officials attempted to downplay the significance of the Gamboa case. Calwell claimed it had aroused "very little real interest" in the Philippines, while Waller dismissed it as a "trivial case". However, the Gamboa case remained a problem for bilateral relations for a number of decades. One Australian diplomat found that "all Filipinos from Manila to the most distant hinterlands knew of Gamboa and the White Australia Policy; in some cases these two items constituted their only knowledge of Australia". In 1957, Ambassador Mick Shann sent a communique to the Department of External Affairs recording his dismay at the number of times the Gamboa case had been raised with him, and emphasised the need to counteract the impressions given. Ambassadors Bill Cutts and Francis Stuart expressed similar sentiments in the 1960s.

== Later life ==
Gamboa visited the Philippines in 1971 for the first time in 20 years, along with his wife, daughter, and son-in-law. In June 1973, Immigration Minister Al Grassby announced that he would allow Gamboa to become an Australian citizen. Gamboa rejected the offer, as it would have required him to renounce his U.S. citizenship, and said that government officials had approached him to take up citizenship on a number of previous occasions.

In 1977, Gamboa and his wife retired to the Gold Coast, Queensland, building a home at Coombabah. Their two children predeceased them, but as of 2002 they had four grandchildren and nine great-grandchildren. After their daughter's death from cancer in 1995, they raised their youngest granddaughter, who was 12 years old at the time. In 2001, the Filipino Communities Council of Australia awarded Gamboa the title of "Filipino-Australian of the Millennium". He died in September 2012, aged 93.
