= Lindsay pamphlet scandal =

Australian electoral scandal during the 2007 federal election campaign

The flyer

The Lindsay pamphlet scandal was an Australian electoral scandal in which Liberal Party volunteers distributed fake election pamphlets, claiming to be from an Islamic organisation that was later found not to exist, that claimed the Labor Party candidate would support clemency for convicted terrorists and the construction of a mosque in the local area. The incident made national and even international headlines on 21 November 2007, three days before the 2007 Australian Federal election.

The retiring Liberal member of parliament representing the federal Division of Lindsay, Jackie Kelly, was forced to explain why her husband, local orthodontist Gary Clark, was caught distributing the pamphlets with four other people. The pamphlets, claiming to be from "The Islamic Australia Federation", thanked the Australian Labor Party (ALP) for supporting terrorists involved with the 2002 Bali bombings.

== The scandal ==
On 20 November 2007, an anonymous member of the Liberal Party contacted the assistant secretary of the ALP, Luke Foley, with information that a flyer linking Foley's party with an extremist Islamic organisation was to be distributed in letterboxes throughout the suburb of St Marys by Liberal members. Due to a redistribution of electoral boundaries, St Marys had recently been moved from the safe Labor seat of Chifley into Jackie Kelly's seat of Lindsay. Because of her impending retirement, Lindsay was at risk of falling to Labor.

At 6.30pm that night, a group of Liberal members met at a home in Ladbury Avenue, Penrith. A short time later, they left that premises and entered another home across the street. This home was later identified as that of Kelly and her husband Gary Clark. In the meantime, Foley, Labor Senator Steve Hutchins and several party volunteers had organised a "sting" operation directed from the Log Cabin Hotel in Penrith. As the Liberal members entered the home in Ladbury Avenue, a Labor party member was observing them from a car parked in the street. Another group of Labor volunteers were deployed by Hutchins to St Marys to await further instructions.

At 8.40pm, the group meeting in Ladbury Avenue left Kelly's home in three cars and drove to St Marys where they parted ways. Various Labor party members, now also including Hutchins and Foley, followed the group. In Boronia Road, the Liberal party group were approached and photographed by Hutchins and eight of his Labor volunteers as they attempted to distribute the bogus pamphlets. Hutchins immediately identified Jeff Egan, Liberal party power broker and member of the State Executive, also a former deputy mayor of the City of the Blue Mountains. Egan continues to deny he was involved in or had any knowledge of the scam. A short distance away, in Magnolia Street, more Labor operatives had similarly ambushed another group of Liberals led by Clark. Clark was photographed attempting to hide his face behind one of the hoaxed flyers; Egan was also photographed with them. Greg Chijoff, husband of the new Liberal candidate for the seat of Lindsay Karen Chijoff, was also found to be involved.

== The pamphlet ==
The pamphlet claimed to be from "The Islamic Australia Federation", a non-existent organisation. It strongly urged support for the Labor party in the upcoming federal election and went on to praise the ALP on a number of divisive issues, including:

- [forgiving] our Muslim brothers who have been unjustly sentenced to death for the Bali bombings, referring to the Labor party's opposition to the death penalty (in particular Robert McClelland's comments) and the Liberals' argument that this policy supports the Bali bombers themselves
- Supporting the construction of a new mosque, as well as the opening of a new mosque in St Marys with the help of local and state government funding
- Support for controversial former Grand Mufti Sheik Taj El-Din Hilaly (spelt "Al-Hilaly")

The pamphlet also misspelt Allahu Akbar as "Ala Akba", with the ALP logo on either side. The logo used was an obsolete one that had been retired after the previous election in 2004. There was also no authorising statement, which all political advertising is required to include.

== Response ==
=== Police investigation ===
The matter was referred by both the Labor and Liberal parties to the Australian Electoral Commission, who in turn referred it to the Australian Federal Police.

On 22 March 2008 NSW police confirmed that they had begun legal proceedings over the incident against five men including Greg Chijoff, Gary Clarke and Jeff Egan.

=== Liberal Party response ===
Jeff Egan was expelled from the Liberal Party over the flyer, and Gary Clark and Greg Chijoff both resigned their memberships under threat of expulsion. While Egan denied all knowledge of the affair as a deliberate scam, Clark and Chijoff both sent letters of apology to NSW Liberal director Graham Jaeschke in which they claimed their wives were also unaware of the plot. Karen Chijoff also claims she knew nothing of it. This claim was later questioned by senior Liberals.

Jackie Kelly spoke about it on radio on 22 November in spite of a party directive not to do so. She said her first instinct when she saw the pamphlet was to laugh because it was a parody of some things that had occurred during the election campaign and compared it to a prank by the satirical comedy team The Chaser.

When I first read it I had to laugh . . . pretty much everyone who has read (it) chuckles, in terms of the parody it does make of various things that have happened during the campaign. My view is that it's a bit of Chaser-style prank.

— Jackie Kelly,

The Prime Minister, John Howard, had to spend part of his last pre-election public address to the National Press Club on 22 November answering questions about the scandal rather than discussing his policies. He said that the Liberal Party had not authorised the leaflets, Howard was quoted as saying, "What more can I do? I have condemned it. I've dissociated myself from it. I think it's stupid, it's offensive, it's wrong, it's untrue. For heaven's sake, get a sense of proportion."

=== ALP response ===
Labor leader Kevin Rudd said the bogus election flyer showed that all the Liberal Party had to offer voters so close to the election was desperation and dirty tactics and that the Prime Minister still had questions to answer over the incident.

=== Muslim community response ===
The Sydney-based chairman of the Australian Federation of Islamic Councils, Ikebal Patel, said falsification of election material created a further rift between mainstream community and Muslims. The current Mufti of Australia, Fehmi Naji, said "When people read stuff like that, they say 'why are we putting up with Muslims?' We want to stop that thought, and show that we can live together and carry out our duty to our country together." It was subsequently reported that Naji was unable to be contacted during the scandal.

=== Media commentary ===
Media reports suggested this incident was part of a pattern of deceptive behaviour undertaken by Liberal party members in previous elections. Various materials, including fake how-to-vote cards and pamphlets with the ALP logo, were allegedly produced by Liberal Party members.

In response to Kelly's claim that the matter was a "Chaser-style prank" Chaser member Julian Morrow called the prank "ham-fisted" and said the pamphlet did not read like a joke. He acknowledged that The Chaser had done a stunt in Mosman that involved claiming a mosque was to be built in the neighbourhood and asking for comments from people on the street. However, he said the aim of their stunt was to reveal the prejudices in the Australian community, not accentuate them in order to try to return the Coalition to government.

On the day of the election, Chaser member Chas Licciardello confronted Karen Chijoff in an Osama bin Laden costume he had used previously during the APEC summit and attempted to pass her copies of the flyer.

=== In Contemporary Art ===
Australian artist Cameron Hayes depicted the event in his large scale polyptych painting What happens when pretend politicians pretend to be terrorists, 2009–2011, oil on canvas, 167.5 x 345.5 cm overall. Using the fraudulent pamphlet scam as the theme for a multi-layered allegorical figurative painting exploring the nature of Australian politics, false propaganda, racism, media and the fallout experienced by individual Muslim Australians in everyday. The painting was exhibited in 2018 at Ronald Feldman Gallery in New York, USA, and later at the Melbourne Art Fair by Australian Galleries, Melbourne and Sydney in Australia.

Tasneem Chopra, a former Curator at the Islamic Museum of Australia and the Immigration Museum, writing "The colloquial conflation of Muslim-with-Islam-with – refugee-with-terrorist, proposing all labels equate with the same cultural bogeyman as an endpoint, allows for a powerful artistic take down by Hayes of this tired trope of Australian minorities."

In 2009 London based filmmaker Sarah Lewis created a short video using detail stills of Hayes' painting and soundscapes.

== Aftermath ==
Five men were charged over the Lindsay leaflet scandal with distribution of unauthorised electoral material. Chijoff was fined $750 on 7 May. The husband of former Liberal MP Jackie Kelly, Gary Clark, and Jeffrey Egan pleaded not guilty and their cases were adjourned to 27 May. A fifth man who was charged, Robert Mathew Holstein, was fined $500 on 20 May.

On 19 May 2009, Clark was found guilty of producing the unauthorised pamphlets and fined $1,100, plus $2,000 in court costs. Egan, however, was found not guilty.

Karen Chijoff threw her husband out of their house because of his behaviour. She also said that her political career was "truly over" as well, and would look toward rejoining the workforce. However, she did not rule out a return to politics at some stage, declaring it would be up to the Liberal Party to make that decision. Ms Chijoff continues to deny any knowledge of the leaflet campaign.

In June 2008, the president of the Labor electorate council in Lindsay alleged that the pamphlets were printed in a Liberal MP's office at taxpayer expense. Earlier, the magistrate in charge of the case suggested that Kelly was involved, though no charges were ever laid against her.

== See also ==
- List of political controversies in Australia
- Political scandal
