= 2025 Australian parliamentary expenses controversy =

- Date: December 2025
- Location: Australia
- Type: Political scandal
- Outcome: Self-referred audits to IPEA
- Inquiries: IPEA Audit (Anika Wells and Michelle Rowland)
- Website: www.ipea.gov.au

In early December 2025, expenses by several members of the Australian Parliament were scrutinised by the news media. The expenses were reported as they were considered to be of an excessively large amount or for unnecessary purposes. The controversy initially arose because of high usage of public funds by sports and communications minister Anika Wells. On 14 December, Michelle Rowland announced that she would pay back some of the money used to fund her family travel to Perth. On 8 May 2026, Wells repaid A$10,116 following an investigation by the Independent Parliamentary Expenses Authority, which found that she had broken travel rules four times.

== Details ==
On 3 December, it was revealed that Wells used more than $189,000 to fly to the United Nations in New York to promote the government's social media ban for under 16-year-olds. Prime minister Anthony Albanese confirmed that his office signed off on this travel expense.

On 4 December, it was revealed that Wells used $3,681 of public funds to attend the birthday party of her friend Connie Blefari — who was a political advisor to prime minister Julia Gillard and is the wife of South Australian health minister Chris Picton — from the Labor Party.

On 7 December, it was reported that Wells spent almost $3,000 to take her family on a trip to Thredbo on an invitation from Paralympics Australia to see their Adaptive Festival weekend. It was also revealed that Wells used $1,800 of public funds to attend the 2024 Formula One Melbourne Grand Prix along with her husband.

On 8 December, The Guardian revealed that trade minister Don Farrell had spent more than $9,000 on travel around Australia to Uluru, the Sydney Opera House and Melbourne.

On 9 December, it was revealed that sports minister Anika Wells hired a Comcar for use at the 2022 AFL Grand Final at the Sydney Cricket Ground, the NRL men's and women's grand finals at the Sydney Olympic Park in 2023, and at the women's singles final of the 2023 Australian Open. She left the car waiting for the duration of the game.

On 10 December, it was revealed that MPs from across the Australian parliament had cumulatively used more than $4 million of public funds for family travel.

== Criticism ==
Wells has come under criticism for her expenses from Liberal senator James Paterson.

An editorial piece in the Australian Financial Review questioned the foresight in making these expenses and explained that she is not the first Australian politician to engage in this sort of activity. One such controversy they point out is that of former speaker Bronwyn Bishop.

Columnist Judith Sloan, writing for Spectator Australia pointed out aspects she disliked of the taxpayer funding Greens senator Sarah Hanson-Young, Wells and Rowlands' travel. Sloan also pointed out that the shooting in Bondi provided a welcome diversion of media attention for these MPs and senators.

Patricia Karvelas stated that there were reasons Wells needed to spend the public money, such as for work purposes and for family reunions. She went on to say that the expenses media attention was a distraction from what the government wants to be promoting in the social media ban.

== Aftermath ==
On 9 December, Wells requested that the Independent Parliamentary Expenses Authority audit her expenses for wrongdoing.

Wells defended her spending on 10 December and remained defiant against attacks from the Coalition.

On 14 December, Michelle Rowland announced that she would pay back some of the money used to fund her family travel to Perth.

On 8 May 2026, Wells repaid $10,116 following an investigation by the Independent Parliamentary Expenses Authority which found that she had broken travel rules four times including a time to see the 2025 AFL Grand Final.

=== Reform ===
In late December, prime minister Anthony Albanese announced that flights for politicians would be limited to economy class and that MPs would only be allowed to travel to Canberra or their electorates using public funds.
