= Godwin Grech =

Australian public servant

- Education: University of Melbourne
- Occupation: Australian public servant (former)
- Years active: 1989–2009
- Parent(s): Sam and Guisa Grech

Godwin Grech is a former Australian Treasury official, best known for his role in the Utegate controversy in 2009.

Grech grew up in Melbourne as the son of Maltese immigrants. After graduating from the University of Melbourne with a Commerce degree, Grech moved to Canberra to join the Australian Public Service.

His public service career was split between the Department of the Prime Minister and Cabinet and the Treasury. For the most part, Grech was close to the policy action of the Howard and Rudd Governments, and had a reputation as being highly diligent and reliable. In the Department of Prime Minister and Cabinet he handled a Western Bulldogs grant in 2004. In the Department of the Treasury, he was in the middle of the 2009 Utegate affair, in which he forged an email to imply special treatment of Labor political donors. The Utegate affair forced his retirement from the public service in 2009.

== Early life ==
Grech's parents were born in Malta in the 1930s and migrated to Australia. Godwin attended St. Paul's College graduating from the school in 1984. Godwin studied commerce at the University of Melbourne.

== Career ==
=== Early Treasury career ===
Directly after graduating university, Grech joined the Australian Public Service. In the late 1990s Grech had executive assignments in Treasury's markets group, dealing with financial institutions and systems and with competition and market access policy. In 1998, he was briefly seconded to work in Joe Hockey's office when Hockey was financial services minister, although the secondment lasted only two weeks due to personal differences with another staffer. By 2003, Grech was general manager of Treasury's competition and consumer policy division.

=== Management of Western Bulldogs government grant ===
From June 2003 to July 2008, Grech worked in the Department of the Prime Minister and Cabinet. At Prime Minister and Cabinet, he advised on employment, business conditions, competition and consumer affairs. In 2004 at the Department, shortly before the 2004 federal election, Grech was responsible for handling a grant to the Western Bulldogs Football Club, a club he supported, for rebuilding Whitten Oval, the training and administrative headquarters for the club. The grant was part of the Howard Government's "pitch to the working class vote", and Grech was, in his own words, "the primary officer that managed and facilitated the Federal Government’s response to the submission by the Western Bulldogs Football Club regarding the proposed re-development of the Whitten Oval. This included oversight and personally briefing the then Prime Minister, the Hon. John Howard, and his office, on the size, scope and overall merit of the project."

=== Utegate ===
In 2008, Grech returned to the Treasury as a principal adviser in its financial systems division. His new position saw him responsible for the $850 million OzCar scheme, including formulating and administering the scheme. While in the position, he created a fake email in which then Prime Minister Kevin Rudd's economics advisor, Andrew Charlton, purportedly sought help in seeking special treatment for a political donor. He then took the email to then Leader of the Opposition Malcolm Turnbull and to media, making allegations against the Prime Minister and then-Treasurer, Wayne Swan.

Utegate, also known as the OzCar affair, was, according to political analyst Barrie Cassidy, the beginning of the end for Malcolm Turnbull's leadership, and according to Michelle Grattan wounded Turnbull terribly. This despite his self-proclaimed motivation to place himself where he thought he could be of most value to Turnbull and the Liberal Party.

Utegate propelled Grech into the public sphere, various politicians were interviewed on their impressions of Grech, with John Howard describing him as "competent and hard-working"; Malcolm Turnbull stating he was "a very highly regarded public servant"; and then-Liberal Member for Mayo Jamie Briggs telling media that "Godwin got the job done: he was the officer for looking after it".

On the back of the scandal Grech resigned from the Treasury department in Spring 2009, while a voluntary psychiatric patient in Canberra. The Australian Federal Police began an investigation into Grech which found that there was evidence Grech had broken the law, but that he would not face criminal charges over the affair. The 16-month-long investigation reputedly took a heavy toll on Grech, who was suffering serious kidney and bowel disease at the time.

== Life after public service ==
Grech sold his home in Calwell, ACT in 2010. In 2012, he made what media described as a "surprise public foray", in which he wrote an opinion piece for The Spectator Australia advocating a Tony Abbott government. He argued in the piece that "Australian governance has deteriorated markedly since the election of the Rudd-Gillard government in November 2007" and commented that chronic leadership instability, spin and incompetence had produced some of the most appalling public policy and administration since Federation in 1901. In 2013, Fairfax Media reported Grech was believed to have won a payout from the federal government for his ill health. Media sought access to case details, but they were deemed confidential and the public was barred from attending court proceedings or accessing court documents.
