= 2025 Liberal Party of Australia leadership election =

Australian political party election

- 13 May 2025

54 caucus members of the Liberal Party 28 caucus votes needed to win
- Leadership election
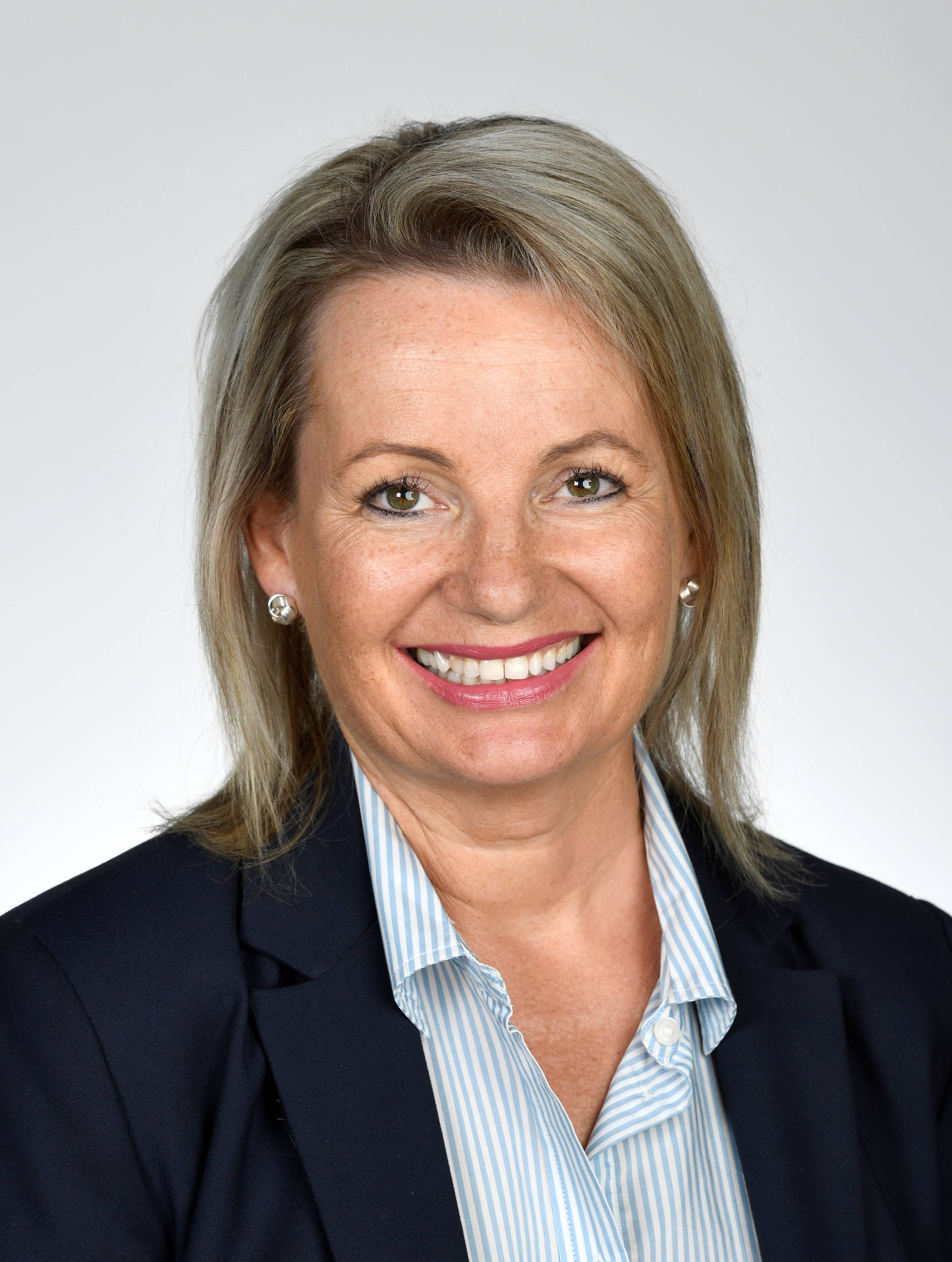

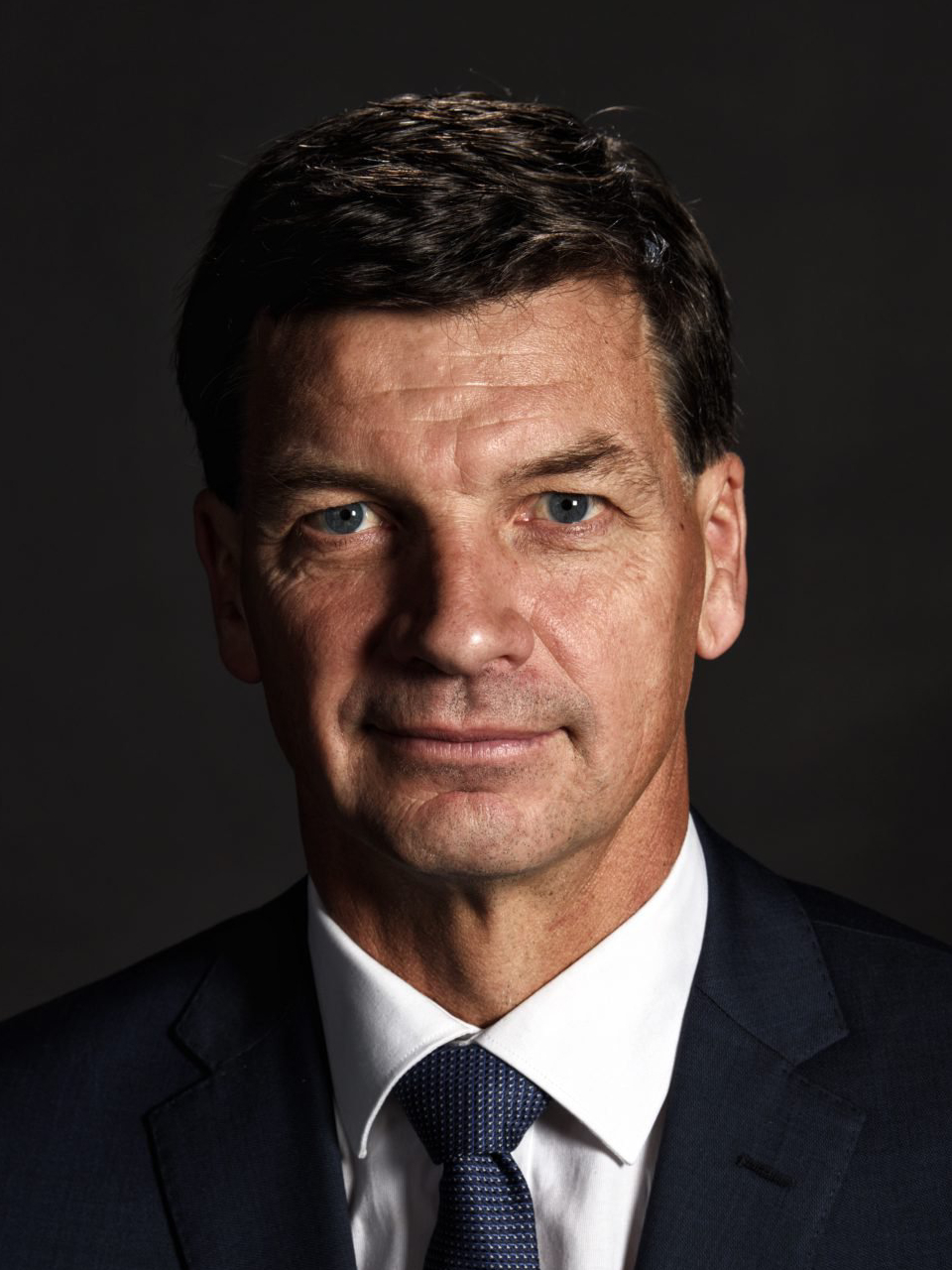
Candidate	Sussan Ley	Angus Taylor
Caucus vote	29	25
Percentage	53.7%	46.3%
Seat	Farrer (NSW)	Hume (NSW)
Faction	Moderate	National Right
Leader before election
Peter Dutton
Elected Leader
Sussan Ley
- Deputy leadership election
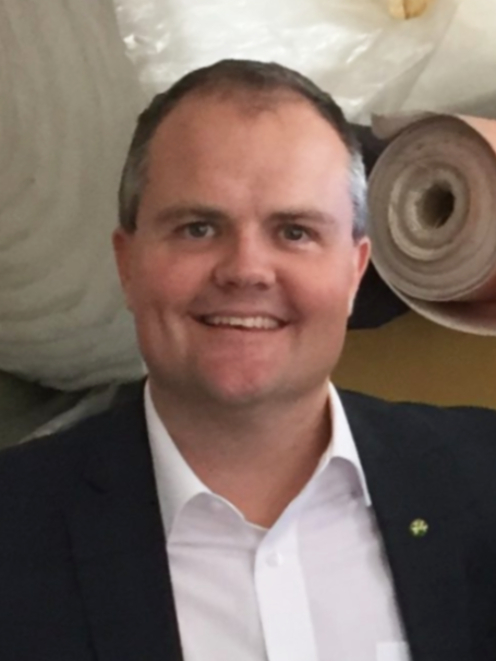

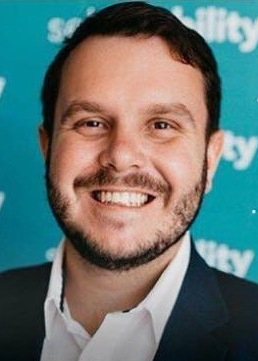
Candidate	Ted O'Brien	Phillip Thompson
Caucus vote	38	16
Percentage	70.4%	29.6%
Seat	Fairfax (Qld.)	Herbert (Qld.)
Faction	Unaligned	National Right
Deputy Leader before election
Sussan Ley
Elected Deputy Leader
Ted O'Brien

A leadership election was held on 13 May 2025 to elect the leader of the Liberal Party of Australia, and by virtue, the leader of the Opposition. The election took place after Peter Dutton lost his seat of Dickson at the 2025 federal election. The ballot was won by then-deputy leader Sussan Ley, who became the first female leader of the Liberal Party.

Ley and shadow treasurer Angus Taylor stated in advance that they would contest the leadership. Country Liberal Northern Territory senator Jacinta Price previously announced her intention to contest the deputy leadership as Taylor's deputy after changing her federal affiliation from the National Party, but did not run after Taylor lost the leadership ballot to Ley.

== Background ==
=== 2022 leadership election ===
The last Liberal Party leadership election was held on 30 May 2022, a week after then-leader and prime minister Scott Morrison led the party to defeat at the 2022 federal election against the Australian Labor Party led by Anthony Albanese after three terms in government, and subsequently resigned as Prime Minister and Liberal leader. Incumbent deputy leader and treasurer Josh Frydenberg lost his seat of Kooyong to teal independent candidate Monique Ryan, making him ineligible to contest the deputy leadership election. The leadership election was won unopposed by Peter Dutton, the outgoing leader of the house, while the deputy leadership election was won by Sussan Ley, the outgoing Minister for the Environment, also unopposed.

=== 2025 federal election ===
Initial predictions for the 2025 federal election had Dutton poised to lead the Liberal–National Coalition to victory after one term in opposition, with the Coalition having taken the lead over Labor in November 2024. From March 2025, Dutton's lead in the polls began to reverse, largely attributed to the unpopularity of the second Trump administration in the United States; the Coalition's campaign rhetoric somewhat mirrored Trump's campaign in 2024, in particular calling for asylum seekers to be detained offshore, cuts to the public sector workforce, and antagonism towards China.

In the 2025 federal election, Dutton led the Coalition to a second consecutive defeat, with Labor increasing their majority, with the Coalition recording their lowest seat share since 1946, the first election contested by the Liberal Party since their rebranding from the United Australia Party the year prior.

== Candidates ==
=== Leader ===
==== Declared ====
Candidate	Electorate	Faction	Announced	Portfolio(s)
Sussan Ley	Farrer (NSW)	Moderate/Centre-Right	9 May 2025	Deputy Leader of the Liberal Party (2022–2025); Minister for the Environment (2019–2022); Minister for Health (2019–2022)
Angus Taylor	Hume (NSW)	National Right	8 May 2025	Minister for Industry, Energy and Emissions Reduction (2018–2022); Shadow Treasurer (2022–28 May 2025)

==== Declined ====
- Andrew Hastie – Canning (WA); Shadow Minister for Defence (2022–2025)
- Dan Tehan – Wannon (Vic); Shadow Minister for Immigration and Citizenship (2022–present)
- Tim Wilson – Goldstein (Vic); Assistant Minister for Industry, Energy and Emissions Reduction (2021–2022)

=== Deputy leader ===
==== Declared ====
Candidate	Electorate	Faction	Portfolio(s)
Ted O'Brien	Fairfax (Qld)	Unaligned	Shadow Minister for Climate Change and Energy (2022–2025)
Phillip Thompson	Herbert (Qld)	National Right	

==== Withdrew ====
Candidate	Electorate	Withdrew	Faction	Portfolio(s)
Jacinta Price	Senator for the Northern Territory	13 May 2025	National Right	Shadow Minister for Indigenous Australians (2023–2025)

==== Speculated ====
Candidate	Electorate	Faction	Portfolio(s)
Sarah Henderson	Senator for Victoria	National Right	Assistant Minister for Social Services and Disability Services (2016–2018)
Melissa McIntosh	Lindsay (NSW)	Centre Right	Shadow Minister for Communications (2025–2025)
Dan Tehan	Wannon (Vic)	Centrist	Shadow Minister for Immigration and Citizenship (2022–2025)

==== Declined ====
- Jane Hume – Senator for Victoria; Shadow Minister for Finance (2022–2025)

== Endorsements ==
On 12 May 2025 (one day before the leadership vote), a document that had circulated within the Liberal Party was published by The Nightly, featuring the reported voting intentions of federal Liberal members. The document showed Ley with the support of 21 members and Taylor with the support of 28 (including Linda Reynolds, who publicly endorsed Ley), while three members were uncommitted. The actual vote saw Ley defeat Taylor 29 votes to 25.

=== Sussan Ley ===
List of Sussan Ley endorsements

Federal Liberal members

- Hollie Hughes – outgoing Senator for New South Wales
- Linda Reynolds – outgoing Senator for Western Australia

Former federal Liberal members

- Warren Entsch – MP for Leichhardt (1996–2007; 2010–2025)

Former heads of government

- Nick Greiner – Premier of New South Wales (1988–1992)
- Barry O'Farrell – Premier of New South Wales (2011–2014)
- Gladys Berejiklian – Premier of New South Wales (2017–2021)
- Jeff Kennett – Premier of Victoria (1992–1999)
- Shane Stone – Chief Minister of the Northern Territory (1995–1999) and former Liberal Party president

Other politicians

- Shirlee Burge – councillor for Edward River
- Doug Curran – Mayor of Griffith (independent)

=== Angus Taylor ===
List of Angus Taylor endorsements

Federal Liberal members

- Claire Chandler – Senator for Tasmania
- Jacinta Price – Senator for the Northern Territory

Former heads of government

- Tony Abbott – Prime Minister of Australia (2013–2015)

=== Tim Wilson ===
List of Tim Wilson endorsements

Former federal Liberal members

- Jason Falinski – MP for Mackellar (2016–2022) and former New South Wales Liberal Party president

== Results ==
		Sussan Ley (29)	Angus Taylor (25)	Unknown
House of Representatives	NSW	Sussan Ley, Alex Hawke, Gisele Kapterian, Julian Leeser, Melissa McIntosh	Angus Taylor, Simon Kennedy	
House of Representatives	VIC	Mary Aldred, Dan Tehan, Tim Wilson, Zoe McKenzie, Jason Wood	Aaron Violi	
House of Representatives	QLD	Angie Bell, Scott Buchholz, Ted O'Brien,Leon Rebello, Andrew Wallace	Garth Hamilton, Henry Pike, Phillip Thompson, Terry Young	Cameron Caldwell
House of Representatives	WA	Melissa Price	Andrew Hastie, Ben Small, Rick Wilson	
House of Representatives	SA	Tom Venning	Tony Pasin	
Senate	NSW	Andrew Bragg, Hollie Hughes, Maria Kovacic, Dave Sharma	—	
Senate	VIC	—	Sarah Henderson, James Paterson	Jane Hume
Senate	QLD	—	—	James McGrath,Paul Scarr
Senate	WA	Linda Reynolds, Dean Smith	Slade Brockman, Michaelia Cash, Matt O'Sullivan	
Senate	SA	Andrew McLachlan, Anne Ruston	Alex Antic, Leah Blyth	David Fawcett, Kerrynne Liddle
Senate	TAS	Richard Colbeck	Wendy Askew, Claire Chandler, Jonathon Duniam	
Senate	NT	—	Jacinta Price	

Gisele Kapterian was thought to have won the seat of Bradfield (New South Wales) but was declared not elected after a recount. Senators David Fawcett, Hollie Hughes and Linda Reynolds remained members of the Liberal party room until their Senate terms expired on 30 June.

== See also ==
- 2025 National Party of Australia leadership spill
- 2025 Australian Greens leadership election
