= Dutton shadow ministry =

- Shadow cabinet of Australia

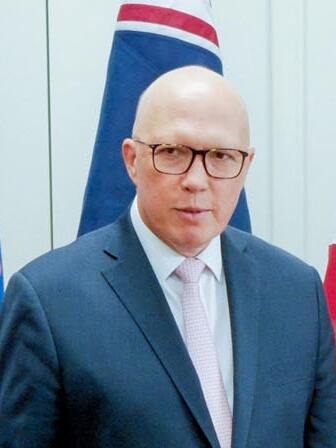
- Peter Dutton
- Date formed: 5 June 2022
- Date dissolved: 3 May 2025

People and organisations
- Opposition Leader: Peter Dutton
- Deputy Opposition Leader: Sussan Ley
- Member party: Liberal–National coalition
- Status in legislature: Coalition opposition

History
- Predecessor: Albanese shadow ministry
- Successor: Ley shadow ministry

The shadow ministry of Peter Dutton was the shadow ministry from 5 June 2022 to 3 May 2025, serving in opposition to the Albanese government. The shadow ministry is the Opposition's alternative to the first Albanese ministry, which was sworn in on 1 June 2022.

The shadow ministry was appointed by Peter Dutton following his election as Leader of the Liberal Party and Leader of the Opposition on 30 May 2022. Dutton and newly elected Nationals leader David Littleproud announced the composition of the shadow ministry on 5 June 2022. It succeeded the Albanese shadow ministry as shadow ministry and the Second Morrison ministry as the Coalition frontbench.

At the 2025 election, the Coalition failed to win government. Furthermore, Dutton lost his own seat at the election, ending his role as opposition leader. Deputy Liberal Party leader and deputy opposition leader was subsequently elected as Liberal party leader and opposition leader, and the Dutton shadow ministry was succeeded by the Ley shadow ministry.

== First arrangement (June 2022–April 2023) ==
On 23 December 2022, shadow minister for regional education, regional health and regional development Andrew Gee resigned from the National Party and the shadow ministry. On 4 January 2023, Darren Chester took over Gee's portfolios except regional health, while Anne Webster took over the regional health portfolio as an assistant shadow minister (as opposed to Gee holding the portfolio as a shadow minister). Webster's portfolio of shadow assistant minister for regional development was abolished.

On 9 February 2023, shadow education minister Alan Tudge announced he would resign from parliament the week after. He resigned from the shadow cabinet on 12 February 2023. Sarah Henderson took over the education portfolio from Tudge, while former frontbencher David Coleman was elevated to the shadow cabinet to take over Henderson's communications portfolio.

On 11 April 2023, shadow attorney-general and shadow minister for indigenous Australians Julian Leeser resigned from the shadow ministry. His resignation resulted in a ministry reshuffle the week after.

Colour key
(for political parties)
Liberal
National

=== Shadow Cabinet ===
Shadow Minister	Portfolio	Image
Peter Dutton MP	Leader of the Opposition; Leader of the Liberal Party	
Sussan Ley MP	Deputy Leader of the Opposition; Shadow Minister for Industry, Skills and Training; Shadow Minister for Small and Family Business; Shadow Minister for Women; Deputy Leader of the Liberal Party	
Senator Marise Payne	Shadow Cabinet Secretary	
Senator Jane Hume	Shadow Minister for Finance; Shadow Special Minister of State; Shadow Minister for the Public Service	
Senator Susan McDonald	Shadow Minister for Resources; Shadow Minister for Northern Australia	
Ted O'Brien MP	Shadow Minister for Climate Change and Energy	
David Littleproud MP	Shadow Minister for Agriculture; Leader of the National Party	
Senator Perin Davey	Shadow Minister for Water; Shadow Minister for Emergency Management; Deputy Leader of the National Party; Deputy Leader of the National Party in the Senate	
Senator Jonathon Duniam	Shadow Minister for Environment, Fisheries and Forestry	
Senator Simon Birmingham	Leader of the Opposition in the Senate; Shadow Minister for Foreign Affairs	
Kevin Hogan MP	Shadow Minister for Trade and Tourism	
Senator Michaelia Cash	Deputy Leader of the Opposition in the Senate; Shadow Minister for Employment and Workplace Relations	
Angus Taylor MP	Shadow Treasurer	
Paul Fletcher MP	Shadow Minister for Government Services and the Digital Economy; Shadow Minister for Science and the Arts; Manager of Opposition Business in the House	
Michael Sukkar MP	Shadow Minister for Social Services; Shadow Minister for the National Disability Insurance Scheme; Shadow Minister for Housing; Shadow Minister for Homelessness	
Karen Andrews MP	Shadow Minister for Home Affairs; Shadow Minister for Child Protection and the Prevention of Family Violence	
Dan Tehan MP	Shadow Minister for Immigration and Citizenship	
Senator Anne Ruston	Shadow Minister for Health and Aged Care; Shadow Minister for Sport; Manager of Opposition Business in the Senate	
Senator Bridget McKenzie	Leader of the National Party in the Senate; Shadow Minister for Infrastructure, Transport and Regional Development	
Senator Sarah Henderson	Shadow Minister for Education (from 12 February 2023); Shadow Minister for Communications (until 12 February 2023)	
Andrew Hastie MP	Shadow Minister for Defence	
Barnaby Joyce MP	Shadow Minister for Veterans' Affairs	
David Coleman MP	Shadow Minister for Communications (from 12 February 2023)	
Former Shadow Ministers
Alan Tudge MP	Shadow Minister for Education (until 12 February 2023)	
Julian Leeser MP	Shadow Attorney-General (until 11 April 2023); Shadow Minister for Indigenous Australians (until 11 April 2023)	

=== Outer shadow ministry ===
Shadow minister	Portfolio	Image
Michael McCormack MP	Shadow Minister for International Development and the Pacific	
Angie Bell MP	Shadow Minister for Early Childhood Education; Shadow Minister for Youth	
Stuart Robert MP	Shadow Assistant Treasurer; Shadow Minister for Financial Services	
Jason Wood MP	Shadow Minister for Community Safety, Migrant Services and Multicultural Affairs	
Senator James Paterson	Shadow Minister for Cyber Security; Shadow Minister for Countering Foreign Interference	
Luke Howarth MP	Shadow Minister for Defence Industry; Shadow Minister for Defence Personnel	
Darren Chester MP	Shadow Minister for Regional Education (from 4 January 2023); Shadow Minister for Regional Development, Local Government and Territories (from 4 January 2023)	
Former Shadow Ministers
Andrew Gee MP	Shadow Minister for Regional Education (until 23 December 2022); Shadow Minister for Regional Health (until 23 December 2022); Shadow Minister for Regional Development, Local Government and Territories (until 23 December 2022)	

=== Shadow assistant ministry ===
Shadow minister	Portfolio	Image
Senator James McGrath	Shadow Assistant Minister to the Leader of the Opposition; Shadow Assistant Minister for Finance	
Michelle Landry MP	Shadow Assistant Minister for Manufacturing	
Senator Hollie Hughes	Shadow Assistant Minister for Climate Change and Energy	
Melissa McIntosh MP	Shadow Assistant Minister for Mental Health and Suicide Prevention	
Rick Wilson MP	Shadow Assistant Minister for Trade	
Senator Claire Chandler	Shadow Assistant Minister for Foreign Affairs	
Nola Marino MP	Shadow Assistant Minister for Education	
Senator Dean Smith	Shadow Assistant Minister for Competition, Charities and Treasury	
Pat Conaghan MP	Shadow Assistant Minister for Social Services; Shadow Assistant Minister for the Prevention of Family Violence	
Gavin Pearce MP	Shadow Assistant Minister for Health, Aged Care and Indigenous Health Services	
Anne Webster MP	Shadow Assistant Minister for Regional Development (until 4 January 2023); Shadow Assistant Minister for Regional Health (from 4 January 2023)	
Tony Pasin MP	Shadow Assistant Minister for Infrastructure and Transport	
Phillip Thompson OAM MP	Shadow Assistant Minister for Defence	

== Second arrangement (April 2023–March 2024) ==
A shadow ministry reshuffle was undertaken on 18 April 2023, a week after shadow attorney-general and shadow minister for indigenous Australians Julian Leeser resigned from the shadow cabinet. In the reshuffle, shadow home affairs minister Karen Andrews also stepped down from the shadow ministry.

Nationals senator Jacinta Nampijinpa Price was elevated to the shadow cabinet and replaced Leeser as the shadow minister for indigenous Australians. Price's elevation meant that the Nationals had greater representation in the shadow cabinet than previously agreed. Former Attorney-General Michaelia Cash regained the portfolio to be the new shadow attorney-general, in addition to her existing portfolios of employment and workplace relations. James Paterson was also elevated to the shadow cabinet to replace Andrews as the shadow home affairs minister, in addition to his existing cyber security portfolio. Paterson's portfolio of Shadow Minister for Countering Foreign Interference was abolished. Kerrynne Liddle was elevated to the outer shadow ministry to replace Andrews as the Shadow Minister for Child Protection and the Prevention of Family Violence.

On 18 May 2023, shadow assistant treasurer and shadow minister for financial services Stuart Robert resigned from parliament and the shadow ministry. On 30 September 2023, shadow cabinet secretary Marise Payne also resigned from parliament and the shadow ministry. These positions were not replaced and remained vacant until the reshuffle in March 2024.

Colour key
(for political parties)
Liberal (Note: Including members of the Liberal National Party of Queensland who sit in the Liberal Party room.)
National (Note: Including members of the Liberal National Party of Queensland and the Country Liberal Party who sit in the National Party room.)

=== Shadow Cabinet ===
Shadow Minister	Portfolio	Image
Peter Dutton MP	Leader of the Opposition; Leader of the Liberal Party	
Sussan Ley MP	Deputy Leader of the Opposition; Shadow Minister for Industry, Skills and Training; Shadow Minister for Small and Family Business; Shadow Minister for Women; Deputy Leader of the Liberal Party	
Senator Jane Hume	Shadow Minister for Finance; Shadow Special Minister of State; Shadow Minister for the Public Service	
Senator Jacinta Nampijinpa Price	Shadow Minister for Indigenous Australians	
Senator Susan McDonald	Shadow Minister for Resources; Shadow Minister for Northern Australia	
Ted O'Brien MP	Shadow Minister for Climate Change and Energy	
David Littleproud MP	Shadow Minister for Agriculture; Leader of the National Party	
Senator Perin Davey	Shadow Minister for Water; Shadow Minister for Emergency Management; Deputy Leader of the National Party; Deputy Leader of the National Party in the Senate	
Senator Jonathon Duniam	Shadow Minister for Environment, Fisheries and Forestry	
Senator Simon Birmingham	Leader of the Opposition in the Senate; Shadow Minister for Foreign Affairs	
Kevin Hogan MP	Shadow Minister for Trade and Tourism	
Senator Michaelia Cash	Deputy Leader of the Opposition in the Senate; Shadow Attorney-General; Shadow Minister for Employment and Workplace Relations	
Senator Sarah Henderson	Shadow Minister for Education	
Angus Taylor MP	Shadow Treasurer	
Paul Fletcher MP	Shadow Minister for Government Services and the Digital Economy; Shadow Minister for Science and the Arts; Manager of Opposition Business in the House	
Michael Sukkar MP	Shadow Minister for Social Services; Shadow Minister for the National Disability Insurance Scheme; Shadow Minister for Housing; Shadow Minister for Homelessness	
Senator James Paterson	Shadow Minister for Home Affairs; Shadow Minister for Cyber Security	
Dan Tehan MP	Shadow Minister for Immigration and Citizenship	
Senator Anne Ruston	Shadow Minister for Health and Aged Care; Shadow Minister for Sport; Manager of Opposition Business in the Senate	
Senator Bridget McKenzie	Leader of the National Party in the Senate; Shadow Minister for Infrastructure, Transport and Regional Development	
David Coleman MP	Shadow Minister for Communications	
Andrew Hastie MP	Shadow Minister for Defence	
Barnaby Joyce MP	Shadow Minister for Veterans' Affairs	
Former Shadow Ministers
Senator Marise Payne	Shadow Cabinet Secretary (until 30 September 2023)	

=== Outer shadow ministry ===
Shadow minister	Portfolio	Image
Michael McCormack MP	Shadow Minister for International Development and the Pacific	
Darren Chester MP	Shadow Minister for Regional Education; Shadow Minister for Regional Development, Local Government and Territories	
Angie Bell MP	Shadow Minister for Early Childhood Education; Shadow Minister for Youth	
Jason Wood MP	Shadow Minister for Community Safety, Migrant Services and Multicultural Affairs	
Luke Howarth MP	Shadow Minister for Defence Industry; Shadow Minister for Defence Personnel	
Senator Kerrynne Liddle	Shadow Minister for Child Protection and the Prevention of Family Violence	
Former Shadow Ministers
Stuart Robert MP	Shadow Assistant Treasurer (until 18 May 2023); Shadow Minister for Financial Services (until 18 May 2023)	

=== Shadow assistant ministry ===
Shadow minister	Portfolio	Image
Senator James McGrath	Shadow Assistant Minister to the Leader of the Opposition; Shadow Assistant Minister for Finance	
Michelle Landry MP	Shadow Assistant Minister for Manufacturing	
Senator Hollie Hughes	Shadow Assistant Minister for Climate Change and Energy	
Melissa McIntosh MP	Shadow Assistant Minister for Mental Health and Suicide Prevention	
Rick Wilson MP	Shadow Assistant Minister for Trade	
Senator Claire Chandler	Shadow Assistant Minister for Foreign Affairs	
Nola Marino MP	Shadow Assistant Minister for Education	
Senator Dean Smith	Shadow Assistant Minister for Competition, Charities and Treasury	
Pat Conaghan MP	Shadow Assistant Minister for Social Services; Shadow Assistant Minister for the Prevention of Family Violence	
Gavin Pearce MP	Shadow Assistant Minister for Health, Aged Care and Indigenous Health Services	
Anne Webster MP	Shadow Assistant Minister for Regional Health	
Tony Pasin MP	Shadow Assistant Minister for Infrastructure and Transport	
Phillip Thompson OAM MP	Shadow Assistant Minister for Defence	

== Third arrangement (March 2024–January 2025) ==
Until March 2024, the positions of Shadow Assistant Treasurer and Shadow Minister for Financial Services had been vacant since May 2023 and Shadow Cabinet Secretary since September 2023, following the resignations of Stuart Robert and Marise Payne from parliament respectively.

A shadow ministry reshuffle was undertaken on 5 March 2024. In the reshuffle, Luke Howarth was appointed as the new Shadow Assistant Treasurer and Shadow Minister for Financial Services. Shadow defence minister Andrew Hastie took on Howarth's portfolios of defence industry and defence personnel in addition to his own. James Paterson was appointed as the new Shadow Cabinet Secretary in addition to his own home affairs and cyber security portfolios. Melissa McIntosh was elevated to the outer shadow ministry and was appointed the newly created positions of Shadow Minister for Energy Affordability and Shadow Minister for Western Sydney.

A number of shadow assistant ministerial portfolios have also been created. Andrew Bragg, James Stevens and Paul Scarr were new additions to the shadow assistant ministry, with Bragg appointed as Shadow Assistant Minister for Home Ownership, Stevens appointed as Shadow Assistant Minister for Government Waste Reduction, and Scarr appointed as Shadow Assistant Minister for Multicultural Engagement. Shadow Assistant Minister for Defence was additionally appointed Shadow Assistant Minister for Defence Industry and Defence Personnel. Hollie Hughes replaced McIntosh as Shadow Assistant Minister for Mental Health and Suicide Prevention, and was also appointed to new position of Shadow Assistant Minister for the National Disability Insurance Scheme. Hughes' previous portfolio of Shadow Assistant Minister for Climate Change and Energy was abolished.

Colour key
(for political parties)
Liberal (Note: Including members of the Liberal National Party of Queensland who sit in the Liberal Party room.)
National (Note: Including members of the Liberal National Party of Queensland and the Country Liberal Party who sit in the National Party room.)

=== Shadow Cabinet ===
Shadow Minister	Portfolio	Image
Peter Dutton MP (Dickson)	Leader of the Opposition; Leader of the Liberal Party	
Sussan Ley MP (Farrer)	Deputy Leader of the Opposition; Shadow Minister for Industry, Skills and Training; Shadow Minister for Small and Family Business; Shadow Minister for Women; Deputy Leader of the Liberal Party	
Senator Jane Hume (Victoria)	Shadow Minister for Finance; Shadow Special Minister of State; Shadow Minister for the Public Service	
Senator Jacinta Nampijinpa Price (Northern Territory)	Shadow Minister for Indigenous Australians	
Senator Susan McDonald (Queensland)	Shadow Minister for Resources; Shadow Minister for Northern Australia	
Ted O'Brien MP (Fairfax)	Shadow Minister for Climate Change and Energy	
David Littleproud MP (Maranoa)	Shadow Minister for Agriculture; Leader of the National Party	
Senator Perin Davey (New South Wales)	Shadow Minister for Water; Shadow Minister for Emergency Management; Deputy Leader of the National Party; Deputy Leader of the National Party in the Senate	
Senator Jonathon Duniam (Tasmania)	Shadow Minister for Environment, Fisheries and Forestry	
Senator Simon Birmingham (South Australia)	Leader of the Opposition in the Senate; Shadow Minister for Foreign Affairs	
Kevin Hogan MP (Page)	Shadow Minister for Trade and Tourism	
Senator Michaelia Cash (Western Australia)	Deputy Leader of the Opposition in the Senate; Shadow Attorney-General; Shadow Minister for Employment and Workplace Relations	
Senator Sarah Henderson (Victoria)	Shadow Minister for Education	
Angus Taylor MP (Hume)	Shadow Treasurer	
Paul Fletcher MP (Bradfield)	Shadow Minister for Government Services and the Digital Economy; Shadow Minister for Science and the Arts; Manager of Opposition Business in the House	
Michael Sukkar MP (Deakin)	Shadow Minister for Social Services; Shadow Minister for the National Disability Insurance Scheme; Shadow Minister for Housing; Shadow Minister for Homelessness	
Senator James Paterson (Victoria)	Shadow Minister for Home Affairs; Shadow Minister for Cyber Security; Shadow Cabinet Secretary	
Dan Tehan MP (Wannon)	Shadow Minister for Immigration and Citizenship	
Senator Anne Ruston (South Australia)	Shadow Minister for Health and Aged Care; Shadow Minister for Sport; Manager of Opposition Business in the Senate	
Senator Bridget McKenzie (Victoria)	Leader of the National Party in the Senate; Shadow Minister for Infrastructure, Transport and Regional Development	
David Coleman MP (Banks)	Shadow Minister for Communications	
Andrew Hastie MP (Canning)	Shadow Minister for Defence; Shadow Minister for Defence Industry; Shadow Minister for Defence Personnel	
Barnaby Joyce MP (New England)	Shadow Minister for Veterans' Affairs	

=== Outer shadow ministry ===
Shadow minister	Portfolio	Image
Michael McCormack MP	Shadow Minister for International Development and the Pacific	
Darren Chester MP	Shadow Minister for Regional Education; Shadow Minister for Regional Development, Local Government and Territories	
Angie Bell MP	Shadow Minister for Early Childhood Education; Shadow Minister for Youth	
Jason Wood MP	Shadow Minister for Community Safety, Migrant Services and Multicultural Affairs	
Luke Howarth MP	Shadow Assistant Treasurer; Shadow Minister for Financial Services	
Senator Kerrynne Liddle	Shadow Minister for Child Protection and the Prevention of Family Violence	
Melissa McIntosh MP	Shadow Minister for Energy Affordability; Shadow Minister for Western Sydney	

=== Shadow assistant ministry ===
Shadow minister	Portfolio	Image
Senator James McGrath	Shadow Assistant Minister to the Leader of the Opposition; Shadow Assistant Minister for Finance	
Michelle Landry MP	Shadow Assistant Minister for Manufacturing	
Senator Hollie Hughes	Shadow Assistant Minister for Mental Health and Suicide Prevention; Shadow Assistant Minister for the National Disability Insurance Scheme	
Rick Wilson MP	Shadow Assistant Minister for Trade	
Senator Claire Chandler	Shadow Assistant Minister for Foreign Affairs	
Nola Marino MP	Shadow Assistant Minister for Education	
Senator Dean Smith	Shadow Assistant Minister for Competition, Charities and Treasury	
Pat Conaghan MP	Shadow Assistant Minister for Social Services; Shadow Assistant Minister for the Prevention of Family Violence	
Gavin Pearce MP	Shadow Assistant Minister for Health, Aged Care and Indigenous Health Services	
Anne Webster MP	Shadow Assistant Minister for Regional Health	
Tony Pasin MP	Shadow Assistant Minister for Infrastructure and Transport	
Phillip Thompson OAM MP	Shadow Assistant Minister for Defence; Shadow Assistant Minister for Defence Industry; Shadow Assistant Minister for Defence Personnel	
Senator Andrew Bragg	Shadow Assistant Minister for Home Ownership	
James Stevens MP	Shadow Assistant Minister for Government Waste Reduction	
Senator Paul Scarr	Shadow Assistant Minister for Multicultural Engagement	

== Final arrangement (January 2025–May 2025) ==
In late 2024, senior shadow cabinet ministers Simon Birmingham (Senate opposition leader) and Paul Fletcher (House manager of opposition business) announced they would be retiring from politics. In December 2024, Michaelia Cash (Senate deputy opposition leader) was elected as the new leader of the opposition in the Senate, with Anne Ruston as the deputy. Both were elected unopposed. These appointments did not take effect until the reshuffle the following month.

Dutton announced a reshuffle on 25 January 2025. David Coleman replaced Birmingham as appointed Shadow Minister for Foreign Affairs. Claire Chandler was promoted to shadow cabinet and replaced Fletcher as Shadow Minister for Government Services and the Digital Economy and Shadow Minister for Science and the Arts. Melissa McIntosh was also promoted to shadow cabinet and replaced Coleman as Shadow Minister for Communications. McIntosh also retained her role as Shadow Minister for Western Sydney, which became a shadow cabinet position as a result of her promotion to the shadow cabinet. Michael Sukkar replaced Fletcher as Manager of Opposition Business in the House, while Jonathan Duniam replaced Ruston as the Manager of Opposition Business in the Senate.

Jacinta Nampijinpa Price, Ted O'Brien and Kerrynne Liddle were given additional portfolios in addition to their own existing ones. Price was additionally appointed Shadow Minister for Government Efficiency (new position, modelled after the new US Department of Government Efficiency), O'Brien was additionally appointed Shadow Minister for Energy Affordability and Reliability (replacing McIntosh), and Liddle was additionally appointed Shadow Minister for Indigenous Health Services.

Tony Pasin was elevated to the outer shadow ministry and was appointed Shadow Minister for Roads and Road Safety. Matt O'Sullivan and Julian Leeser were new additions to the assistant shadow ministry, with Leeser returning to the ministry since quitting the shadow cabinet in April 2023. O'Sullivan was appointed Shadow Assistant Minister for Education, and Leeser was appointed Shadow Assistant Minister for Foreign Affairs.

Colour key
(for political parties)
Liberal (Note: Including members of the Liberal National Party of Queensland who sit in the Liberal Party room.)
National (Note: Including members of the Liberal National Party of Queensland and the Country Liberal Party who sit in the National Party room.)

=== Shadow Cabinet ===
Shadow Minister	Portfolio	Image
Peter Dutton MP (Dickson)	Leader of the Opposition; Leader of the Liberal Party	
Sussan Ley MP (Farrer)	Deputy Leader of the Opposition; Shadow Minister for Industry, Skills and Training; Shadow Minister for Small and Family Business; Shadow Minister for Women; Deputy Leader of the Liberal Party	
Senator Jane Hume (Victoria)	Shadow Minister for Finance; Shadow Special Minister of State; Shadow Minister for the Public Service	
Senator Jacinta Nampijinpa Price (Northern Territory)	Shadow Minister for Indigenous Australians; Shadow Minister for Government Efficiency	
Senator Susan McDonald (Queensland)	Shadow Minister for Resources; Shadow Minister for Northern Australia	
Ted O'Brien MP (Fairfax)	Shadow Minister for Climate Change and Energy; Shadow Minister for Energy Affordability and Reliability	
David Littleproud MP (Maranoa)	Shadow Minister for Agriculture; Leader of the National Party	
Senator Perin Davey (New South Wales)	Shadow Minister for Water; Shadow Minister for Emergency Management; Deputy Leader of the National Party; Deputy Leader of the National Party in the Senate	
Senator Jonathon Duniam (Tasmania)	Shadow Minister for Environment, Fisheries and Forestry; Manager of Opposition Business in the Senate	
Kevin Hogan MP (Page)	Shadow Minister for Trade and Tourism	
Senator Michaelia Cash (Western Australia)	Leader of the Opposition in the Senate; Shadow Attorney-General; Shadow Minister for Employment and Workplace Relations	
Senator Sarah Henderson (Victoria)	Shadow Minister for Education	
Angus Taylor MP (Hume)	Shadow Treasurer	
Michael Sukkar MP (Deakin)	Shadow Minister for Social Services; Shadow Minister for the National Disability Insurance Scheme; Shadow Minister for Housing; Shadow Minister for Homelessness; Manager of Opposition Business in the House	
Senator James Paterson (Victoria)	Shadow Minister for Home Affairs; Shadow Minister for Cyber Security; Shadow Cabinet Secretary	
Dan Tehan MP (Wannon)	Shadow Minister for Immigration and Citizenship	
Senator Anne Ruston (South Australia)	Shadow Minister for Health and Aged Care; Shadow Minister for Sport; Deputy Leader of the Opposition in the Senate	
Senator Bridget McKenzie (Victoria)	Leader of the National Party in the Senate; Shadow Minister for Infrastructure, Transport and Regional Development	
David Coleman MP (Banks)	Shadow Minister for Foreign Affairs	
Andrew Hastie MP (Canning)	Shadow Minister for Defence; Shadow Minister for Defence Industry; Shadow Minister for Defence Personnel	
Barnaby Joyce MP (New England)	Shadow Minister for Veterans' Affairs	
Melissa McIntosh MP (Lindsay)	Shadow Minister for Communications	
Senator Claire Chandler (Tasmania)	Shadow Minister for Government Services and the Digital Economy; Shadow Minister for Science and the Arts	

=== Outer shadow ministry ===
Shadow minister	Portfolio	Image
Michael McCormack MP	Shadow Minister for International Development and the Pacific	
Darren Chester MP	Shadow Minister for Regional Education; Shadow Minister for Regional Development, Local Government and Territories	
Angie Bell MP	Shadow Minister for Early Childhood Education; Shadow Minister for Youth	
Jason Wood MP	Shadow Minister for Community Safety, Migrant Services and Multicultural Affairs	
Luke Howarth MP	Shadow Assistant Treasurer; Shadow Minister for Financial Services	
Senator Kerrynne Liddle	Shadow Minister for Child Protection and the Prevention of Family Violence; Shadow Minister for Indigenous Health Services	
Tony Pasin MP	Shadow Minister for Roads and Road Safety	

=== Shadow assistant ministry ===
Shadow minister	Portfolio	Image
Senator James McGrath	Shadow Assistant Minister to the Leader of the Opposition; Shadow Assistant Minister for Finance	
Michelle Landry MP	Shadow Assistant Minister for Manufacturing	
Senator Hollie Hughes	Shadow Assistant Minister for Mental Health and Suicide Prevention; Shadow Assistant Minister for the National Disability Insurance Scheme	
Rick Wilson MP	Shadow Assistant Minister for Trade	
Nola Marino MP	Shadow Assistant Minister for Education	
Senator Dean Smith	Shadow Assistant Minister for Competition, Charities and Treasury	
Pat Conaghan MP	Shadow Assistant Minister for Social Services; Shadow Assistant Minister for the Prevention of Family Violence	
Gavin Pearce MP	Shadow Assistant Minister for Health, Aged Care and Indigenous Health Services	
Anne Webster MP	Shadow Assistant Minister for Regional Health	
Phillip Thompson OAM MP	Shadow Assistant Minister for Defence; Shadow Assistant Minister for Defence Industry; Shadow Assistant Minister for Defence Personnel	
Senator Andrew Bragg	Shadow Assistant Minister for Home Ownership	
James Stevens MP	Shadow Assistant Minister for Government Waste Reduction	
Senator Paul Scarr	Shadow Assistant Minister for Multicultural Engagement	
Senator Matt O'Sullivan	Shadow Assistant Minister for Education	
Julian Leeser MP	Shadow Assistant Minister for Foreign Affairs	
