= Taylor shadow ministry =

Shadow ministry of opposition leader Angus Taylor

- Shadow cabinet of Australia

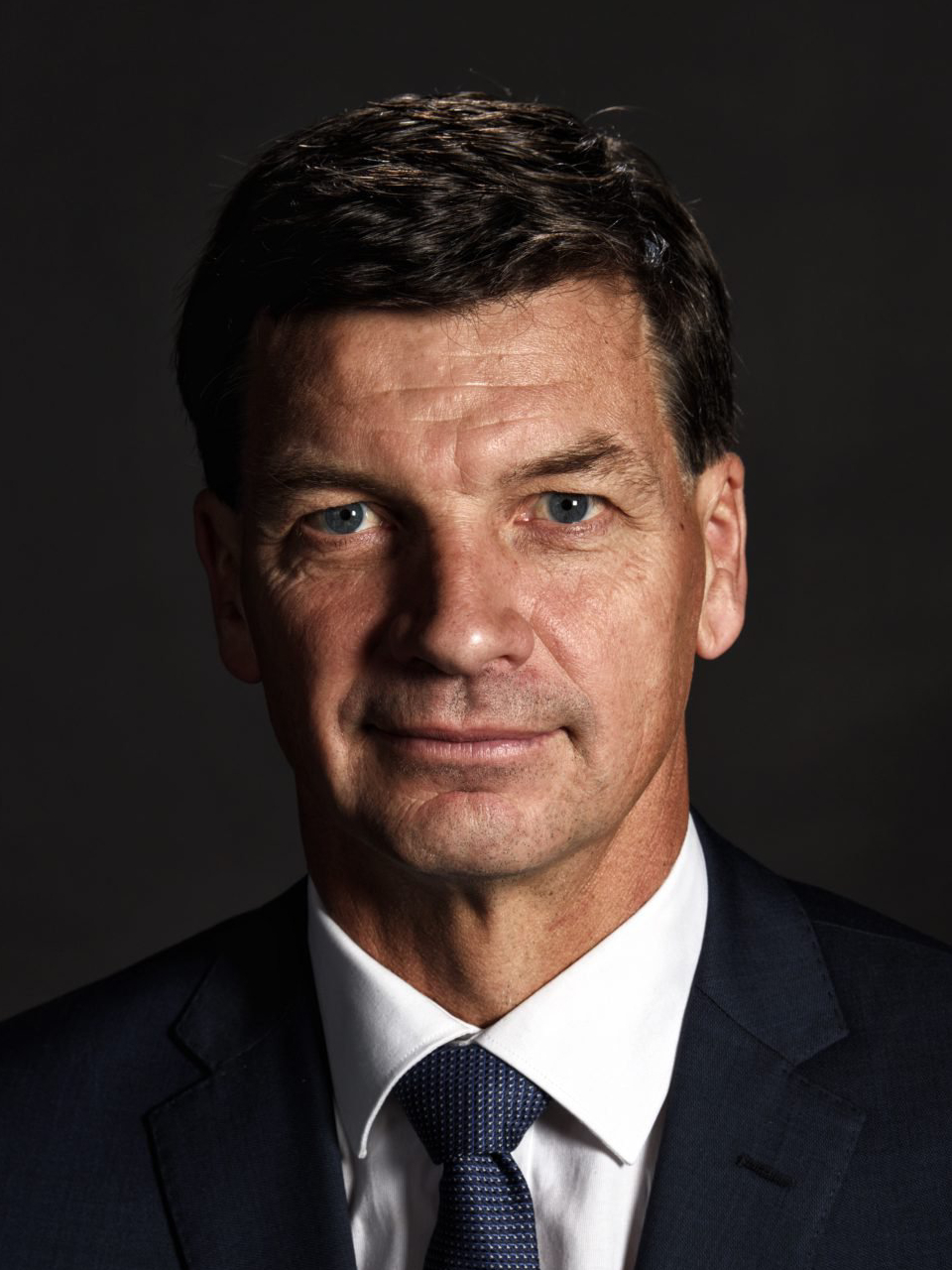
- Angus Taylor
- Date formed: 17 February 2026

People and organisations
- Opposition Leader: Angus Taylor
- Deputy Opposition Leader: Jane Hume
- Total no. of members: 44
- Member parties: Liberal; National
- Status in legislature: Opposition

History
- Legislature term: 48th
- Predecessor: Ley shadow ministry

The shadow ministry of Angus Taylor is the shadow ministry from February 2026, in opposition to the Albanese government. The shadow ministry is the Opposition's alternative to the Albanese ministry.

The shadow ministry was appointed by Liberal Party leader Angus Taylor and his deputy Jane Hume on 17 February 2026, following a party leadership spill on 13 February when Taylor defeated incumbent leader Sussan Ley 34 votes to 17 and Hume defeated incumbent deputy Ted O'Brien in the final ballot 30 votes to 20. The shadow ministry succeeded the Ley shadow ministry as shadow ministry and Coalition frontbench, with no changes to portfolios held by the Liberal Party's coalition partner National Party.

== Current arrangement (March 2026–present) ==
On 10 March 2026, National Party leader David Littleproud announced he would stand down as leader. The following day, Matt Canavan was elected as party leader and Darren Chester was elected as deputy party leader. Canavan had not been in the Coalition frontbench since 2020. Due to the change in party leadership, the National-held portfolios would undergo a reshuffle.

The National Party's portfolio reshuffle was announced on 16 March 2026. Canavan took the trade portfolio, previously held by previous deputy leader Kevin Hogan, and Chester took the agriculture portfolio, previously held by Littleproud. Ross Cadell and Pat Conaghan were not retained in the frontbench and were demoted to the backbench. Former party leader Michael McCormack, who became a backbencher following the 2025 election, was elevated back to shadow cabinet and was appointed water and veteran affairs shadow minister. Hogan was appointed shadow assistant treasurer and shadow financial services minister, but remained in shadow cabinet as deputy manager of opposition business. Littleproud was retained in the frontbench in the outer shadow ministry, and was appointed emergency management and tourism shadow minister. Anne Webster gained the regional health portfolio but lost the regional development portfolio, while she retained the regional communications portfolio. Bridget McKenzie's shadow ministerial title was split into two titles, but she continued to retain the infrastructure, transport and regional development portfolios.

In the shadow assistant ministry, the shadow assistant ministers also had some of their portfolios shuffled around.

=== Shadow cabinet ===
Party	Shadow Minister	Portrait	Portfolio	Ref
Liberal	Hon Angus Taylor (born 1966) MP for Hume (NSW) (2013–)		Leader of the Opposition; Leader of the Liberal Party	
National (LNP)	Hon Matt Canavan(born 1980) Senator for Queensland (2014–)		Shadow Minister for Trade, Investment and Tourism; Leader of the National Party	
Liberal	Hon Jane Hume (born 1971) Senator for Victoria (2016–)		Deputy Leader of the Opposition; Deputy Leader of the Liberal Party; Shadow Minister for Employment and Workplace Relations; Shadow Minister for Productivity and Deregulation	
Liberal	Hon Michaelia Cash (born 1970) Senator for Western Australia (2008–)		Leader of the Opposition in the Senate; Shadow Attorney-General	
Liberal	Hon Anne Ruston (born 1963) Senator for South Australia (2012–)		Deputy Leader of the Opposition in the Senate; Shadow Minister for Health and Aged Care	
Liberal	Hon Tim Wilson (born 1980) MP for Goldstein (2016–2022, 2025–)		Shadow Treasurer	
Liberal	Hon Andrew Hastie (born 1982) MP for Canning (2015–)		Deputy Leader of the Opposition in the House of Representatives; Shadow Minister for Industry and Sovereign Capability	
Liberal	Hon Jonno Duniam (born 1982) Senator for Tasmania (2016–)		Manager of Opposition Business in the Senate; Shadow Minister for Home Affairs and Immigration	
Liberal	James Paterson (born 1987) Senator for Victoria (2016–)		Shadow Minister for Defence	
Liberal	Claire Chandler (born 1990) Senator for Victoria (2019–)		Shadow Minister for Finance; Shadow Minister for the Public Service; Shadow Minister for Government Services	
Liberal (LNP)	Ted O'brien (born 1974) MP for Fairfax (2016–)		Shadow Minister for Foreign Affairs	
National	Hon Bridget McKenzie (born 1969) Senator for Victoria (2011–)		Leader of the National Party in the Senate; Shadow Minister for Infrastructure and Transport; Shadow Minister for Regional Development, Local Government and Territories	
Liberal	Julian Leeser (born 1976) MP for Berowra (2016–)		Shadow Minister for Education; Shadow Minister for Indigenous Australians	
Liberal	Melissa McIntosh (born 1977) MP for Lindsay (2019–)		Shadow Minister for Families and Social Services; Shadow Minister for Women; Shadow Minister for the National Disability Insurance Scheme	
Liberal	Hon Sarah Henderson (born 1964) Senator for Victoria (2019–)		Minister for Communications and Digital Safety	
Liberal	Andrew Bragg (born 1984) Senator for New South Wales (2019–)		Shadow Minister for the Environment; Shadow Minister for Housing and Homelessness	
Liberal (CLP)	Jacinta Nampijinpa Price (born 1981) Senator for the Northern Territory (2022–)		Shadow Minister for Skills and Training; Shadow Minister for Small Business	
Liberal	Hon Dan Tehan (born 1968) MP for Wannon (2010–)		Manager of Opposition Business in the House; Shadow Minister for Energy and Emissions Reduction	
National	Hon Darren Chester (born 1967) MP for Gippsland (2008–)		Deputy Leader of the National Party; Leader of the National Party in the House of Representatives; Shadow Minister for Agriculture, Fisheries and Forestry	
National	Hon Michael McCormack (born 1964) MP for Riverina (2010–)		Shadow Minister for Water; Shadow Minister for Veterans' Affairs	
National	Hon Kevin Hogan (born 1963) MP for Page (2013–)		Deputy Manager of Opposition Business in the House; Shadow Assistant Treasurer; Shadow Minister for Financial Services	
National (LNP)	Susan McDonald (born 1970) Senator for the Queensland (2019–)		Deputy Leader of the National Party in the Senate; Shadow Minister for Resources and Northern Australia	
Liberal (LNP)	Phillip Thompson (born 1988) MP for Herbert (2019–)		Shadow Minister for Defence Industry; Shadow Minister for Defence Personnel	

=== Shadow outer ministry ===
Party	Shadow Minister	Portrait	Offices	Ref
Liberal	Tony Pasin (born 1977) MP for Barker (SA) (2013–)		Shadow Minister Assisting for Fisheries and Forestry; Shadow Minister for Scrutiny of Government Waste and Accountability	
Liberal (LNP)	Angie Bell (born 1968) MP for Moncrieff (Qld.) (2019–)		Shadow Minister for Sport; Shadow Minister for Arts; Shadow Minister for Youth	
National (LNP)	Hon David Littleproud (born 1976) MP for Maranoa (Qld.) (2016–)		Shadow Minister for Emergency Management; Shadow Minister for Tourism	
Liberal	Aaron Violi (born 1984) MP for Casey (Vic.) (2022–)		Shadow Minister for Science, Technology and Innovation; Shadow Minister for Cyber Security; Shadow Minister for the Digital Economy	
Liberal (LNP)	Hon James McGrath (born 1974) Senator for Queensland (2014–)		Shadow Special Minister of State; Shadow Minister for Urban Infrastructure and Cities; Shadow Minister for Brisbane 2032 Olympic and Paralympic Games	
Liberal	Matt O'Sullivan (born 1978) Senator for Western Australia (2019–)		Shadow Minister for Choice in Childcare and Early Learning; Shadow Minister for Child Protection and the Prevention of Family Violence; Deputy Manager of Opposition Business in the Senate	
National	Dr. Anne Webster (born 1959) MP for Mallee (Vic.) (2019–)		Shadow Minister for Regional Health; Shadow Minister for Regional Communications	

=== Shadow assistant ministry ===
Party	Shadow Minister	Portrait	Offices	Ref
Liberal	Maria Kovacic (born 1970) Senator for New South Wales (2023-)		Shadow Assistant Minister for Women; Shadow Assistant Minister for Productivity and Deregulation	
National	Jamie Chaffey MP for Parkes (NSW) (2025–)		Shadow Assistant Minister for Regional Development, Local Government and Territories; Shadow Assistant Minister for Resources	
Liberal	Zoe McKenzie (born 1972) MP for Flinders (Vic.) (2022–)		Shadow Assistant Minister for Employment and Industrial Relations; Shadow Cabinet Secretary; Co-Chair of the Coalition Policy Development Committee	
Liberal	Kerrynne Liddle (born 1967) Senator for South Australia (2022–)		Shadow Assistant Minister for Health and Aged Care	
Liberal (LNP)	Cameron Caldwell (born 1979) MP for Fadden (Qld.) (2023–)		Shadow Assistant Minister for Housing	
Liberal (LNP)	Garth Hamilton (born 1979) MP for Groom (Qld.) (2020–)		Shadow Assistant Minister for Energy Security and Affordability	
Liberal	Dave Sharma (born 1975) Senator for New South Wales (2023–); MP for Wentworth (NSW) (2019–2022)		Shadow Assistant Minister for Citizenship and Multicultural Affairs; Shadow Assistant Minister for International Development and the Indo-Pacific	
Liberal	Leah Blyth Senator for South Australia (2025–)		Shadow Assistant Minister for Defence Infrastructure	
Liberal	Ben Small (born 1988) MP for Forrest (WA) (2025–); Senator for Western Australia (2020–2022, 2022)		Shadow Assistant Minister for Infrastructure; Shadow Assistant Minister for Electoral Matters	
National	Sam Birrell (born 1975) MP for Nicholls (Vic.) (2022–)		Shadow Assistant Minister for Regional Education; Shadow Assistant Minister for Agriculture	
Liberal	Simon Kennedy (born 1982) MP for Cook (NSW) (2024–)		Shadow Assistant Minister to the Leader of the Opposition; Shadow Assistant Minister for Finance; Co-Chair of the Coalition Policy Development Committee	
Liberal (LNP)	Henry Pike (born 1987) MP for Bowman (Qld.) (2022–)		Shadow Assistant Minister for Mental Health; Shadow Assistant Minister for the National Disability Insurance Scheme	
Liberal	Dean Smith (born 1969) Senator for Western Australia (2012–)		Shadow Assistant Minister to the Shadow Treasurer; Shadow Assistant Minister for the Cost of Living	
National (LNP)	Andrew Willcox (born 1969) MP for Dawson (Qld.) (2022–)		Shadow Assistant Minister for Manufacturing and Sovereign Capability	

== First arrangement (February–March 2026) ==
Following Taylor's successful spill against his predecessor Sussan Ley, Taylor announced his shadow ministry on 17 February 2026. The other ten frontbenchers who resigned from the Ley shadow ministry the week before (like Taylor himself) were re-appointed to the shadow ministry.

Taylor dumped Alex Hawke, Andrew Wallace, Paul Scarr, Melissa Price and Scott Buchholz from the frontbench, all of whom were reported to be supporters of Ley. Jason Wood was also dumped from the frontbench. Taylor also demoted James McGrath and Angie Bell from the shadow cabinet to the shadow outer ministry, and Kerrynne Liddle from the shadow cabinet to the shadow assistant ministry. Ley was also not included in the shadow ministry as she had already announced her intention to resign from parliament after the spill.

Taylor also promoted a few of his supporters back to the shadow cabinet, such as Andrew Hastie, Sarah Henderson and Jacinta Nampijinpa Price, who along with Hume, were backbenchers during the second half of Ley's leadership (October 2025 to February 2026). Hastie was also appointed the "Deputy Leader of the Opposition in the House of Representatives", as Hume, being the deputy party leader and deputy opposition leader, was a senator. This is similar to the arrangement between 1989 and 1990, when deputy party leader Fred Chaney was a senator, and Wal Fife was the similarly titled "Deputy Leader of the Liberal Party in the House of Representatives".

The portfolios of other shadow cabinet ministers were also reshuffled. Key reshuffles and appointments include Tim Wilson appointed as shadow treasurer, Claire Chandler as shadow finance minister, Michaelia Cash appointed as shadow attorney-general, Ted O'Brien appointed as shadow foreign affairs minister, and James Paterson appointed as shadow defence minister.

Aaron Violi was elevated from the shadow assistant ministry to the shadow outer ministry, while Tony Pasin was brought back from the backbench into the shadow outer ministry. Henry Pike and Ben Small were elevated from the backbench to the shadow assistant ministry.

The eleven National Party frontbenchers, including party leader David Littleproud and deputy leader Kevin Hogan, also had their previous portfolios in the Ley shadow ministry reinstated immediately, brought forward from the intended 1 March 2026 date. These frontbenchers previously resigned their roles in January 2026 during the Coalition split, and a renewed Coalition agreement towards the end of the Ley shadow ministry had intended their portfolios to be reinstated on 1 March 2026.

=== Shadow cabinet ===
Party	Shadow Minister	Portrait	Offices	Ref
Liberal	Hon Angus Taylor (born 1966) MP for Hume (NSW) (2013–)		Leader of the Opposition; Leader of the Liberal Party	
National (LNP)	Hon David Littleproud (born 1976) MP for Maranoa (Qld.) (2016–)		Shadow Minister for Agriculture; Leader of the National Party	
Liberal	Hon Jane Hume (born 1971) Senator for Victoria (2016–)		Deputy Leader of the Opposition; Deputy Leader of the Liberal Party; Shadow Minister for Employment and Industrial Relations; Shadow Minister for Productivity and Deregulation	
Liberal	Hon Michaelia Cash (born 1970) Senator for Western Australia (2008–)		Leader of the Opposition in the Senate; Shadow Attorney-General	
Liberal	Hon Anne Ruston (born 1963) Senator for South Australia (2012–)		Deputy Leader of the Opposition in the Senate; Shadow Minister for Health and Aged Care	
Liberal	Hon Tim Wilson (born 1980) MP for Goldstein (Vic.) (2016–2022, 2025–)		Shadow Treasurer	
Liberal	Hon Andrew Hastie (born 1982) MP for Canning (WA) (2015–)		Shadow Minister for Industry and Sovereign Capability; Deputy Leader of the Opposition in the House of Representatives	
Liberal	Hon Jonathon Duniam (born 1982) Senator for Tasmania (2016–)		Shadow Minister for Home Affairs; Shadow Minister for Immigration; Manager of Opposition Business in the Senate	
Liberal	James Paterson (born 1987) Senator for Victoria (2016–)		Shadow Minister for Defence	
Liberal	Claire Chandler (born 1990) Senator for Tasmania (2019–)		Shadow Minister for Finance; Shadow Minister for the Public Service; Shadow Minister for Government Services	
Liberal (LNP)	Ted O'Brien (born 1974) MP for Fairfax (Qld.) (2016–)		Shadow Minister for Foreign Affairs	
National	Hon Bridget McKenzie (born 1969) Senator for Victoria (2011–)		Shadow Minister for Infrastructure, Transport and Regional Development; Leader of the National Party in the Senate	
Liberal	Julian Leeser (born 1976) MP for Berowra (NSW) (2016–)		Shadow Minister for Education; Shadow Minister for Indigenous Australians	
Liberal	Melissa McIntosh (born 1977) MP for Lindsay (NSW) (2019–)		Shadow Minister for Families and Social Services; Shadow Minister for Women; Shadow Minister for the National Disability Insurance Scheme	
Liberal	Hon Sarah Henderson (born 1964) Senator for Victoria (2019–); MP for Corangamite (Vic.) (2013–2019)		Shadow Minister for Communications and Digital Safety	
Liberal	Andrew Bragg (born 1984) Senator for New South Wales (2019–)		Shadow Minister for Environment; Shadow Minister for Housing and Homelessness	
Liberal (CLP)	Jacinta Nampijinpa Price (born 1981) Senator for the Northern Territory (2022–)		Shadow Minister for Skills and Training; Shadow Minister for Small Business	
Liberal	Hon Dan Tehan (born 1968) MP for Wannon (Vic.) (2010–)		Shadow Minister for Energy and Emissions Reduction; Manager of Opposition Business in the House	
National	Ross Cadell (born 1969) Senator for New South Wales (2022–)		Shadow Minister for Emergency Management; Shadow Minister for Water; Shadow Minister for Fisheries and Forestry	
National	Hon Darren Chester (born 1967) MP for Gippsland (Vic.) (2008–)		Shadow Minister for Veterans' Affairs	
National	Hon Kevin Hogan (born 1963) MP for Page (NSW) (2013–)		Shadow Minister for Trade, Investment and Tourism; Deputy Leader of the National Party; Deputy Manager of Opposition Business in the House	
National (LNP)	Susan McDonald (born 1970) Senator for Queensland (2019–)		Shadow Minister for Resources; Shadow Minister for Northern Australia; Deputy Leader of the National Party in the Senate	
Liberal (LNP)	Phillip Thompson (born 1988) MP for Herbert (Qld.) (2019–)		Shadow Minister for Defence Industry; Shadow Minister for Defence Personnel	

=== Shadow outer ministry ===
Party	Shadow Minister	Portrait	Offices	Ref
Liberal	Tony Pasin (born 1977) MP for Barker (SA) (2013–)		Shadow Minister Assisting for Fisheries and Forestry; Shadow Minister for Scrutiny of Government Waste and Accountability	
Liberal (LNP)	Angie Bell (born 1968) MP for Moncrieff (Qld.) (2019–)		Shadow Minister for Sport; Shadow Minister for Arts; Shadow Minister for Youth	
National	Pat Conaghan (born 1971) MP for Cowper (NSW) (2019–)		Shadow Assistant Treasurer; Shadow Minister for Financial Services	
Liberal	Aaron Violi (born 1984) MP for Casey (Vic.) (2022–)		Shadow Minister for Science, Technology and Innovation; Shadow Minister for Cyber Security; Shadow Minister for the Digital Economy	
Liberal (LNP)	Hon James McGrath (born 1974) Senator for Queensland (2014–)		Shadow Special Minister of State; Shadow Minister for Urban Infrastructure and Cities; Shadow Minister for Brisbane 2032 Olympic and Paralympic Games	
Liberal	Matt O'Sullivan (born 1978) Senator for Western Australia (2019–)		Shadow Minister for Choice in Childcare and Early Learning; Shadow Minister for Child Protection and the Prevention of Family Violence; Deputy Manager of Opposition Business in the Senate	
National	Dr. Anne Webster (born 1959) MP for Mallee (Vic.) (2019–)		Shadow Minister for Regional Development, Local Government and Territories; Shadow Minister for Regional Communications	

=== Shadow assistant ministry ===
Party	Shadow Minister	Portrait	Offices	Ref
Liberal	Maria Kovacic (born 1970) Senator for New South Wales (2023-)		Shadow Assistant Minister for Women; Shadow Assistant Minister for Productivity and Deregulation	
National	Jamie Chaffey MP for Parkes (NSW) (2025–)		Shadow Assistant Minister for Agriculture; Shadow Assistant Minister for Resources	
Liberal	Zoe McKenzie (born 1972) MP for Flinders (Vic.) (2022–)		Shadow Assistant Minister for Employment and Industrial Relations; Shadow Cabinet Secretary; Co-Chair of the Coalition Policy Development Committee	
Liberal	Kerrynne Liddle (born 1967) Senator for South Australia (2022–)		Shadow Assistant Minister for Health and Aged Care	
Liberal (LNP)	Cameron Caldwell (born 1979) MP for Fadden (Qld.) (2023–)		Shadow Assistant Minister for Housing	
Liberal (LNP)	Garth Hamilton (born 1979) MP for Groom (Qld.) (2020–)		Shadow Assistant Minister for Energy Security and Affordability	
Liberal	Dave Sharma (born 1975) Senator for New South Wales (2023–); MP for Wentworth (NSW) (2019–2022)		Shadow Assistant Minister for Citizenship and Multicultural Affairs; Shadow Assistant Minister for International Development and the Indo-Pacific	
Liberal	Leah Blyth Senator for South Australia (2025–)		Shadow Assistant Minister for Defence Infrastructure	
Liberal	Ben Small (born 1988) MP for Forrest (WA) (2025–); Senator for Western Australia (2020–2022, 2022)		Shadow Assistant Minister for Infrastructure; Shadow Assistant Minister for Electoral Matters	
National	Sam Birrell (born 1975) MP for Nicholls (Vic.) (2022–)		Shadow Assistant Minister for Regional Education; Shadow Assistant Minister for Regional Health	
Liberal	Simon Kennedy (born 1982) MP for Cook (NSW) (2024–)		Shadow Assistant Minister to the Leader of the Opposition; Shadow Assistant Minister for Finance; Co-Chair of the Coalition Policy Development Committee	
Liberal (LNP)	Henry Pike (born 1987) MP for Bowman (Qld.) (2022–)		Shadow Assistant Minister for Mental Health; Shadow Assistant Minister for the National Disability Insurance Scheme	
Liberal	Dean Smith (born 1969) Senator for Western Australia (2012–)		Shadow Assistant Minister to the Shadow Treasurer; Shadow Assistant Minister for the Cost of Living	
National (LNP)	Andrew Willcox (born 1969) MP for Dawson (Qld.) (2022–)		Shadow Assistant Minister for Manufacturing and Sovereign Capability	

== See also ==
- 2026 National Party of Australia leadership spill motion
