= Fair Work Amendment (Supporting Australia's Jobs and Economic Recovery) Act 2021 =

Australian industrial relations law

Fair Work Amendment Act 2021

Parliament of Australia
- Long title: An Act to amend the Fair Work Act 2009, and for related purposes
- Citation: No. 25 of 2021
- Territorial extent: States and territories of Australia
- Considered by: Australian House of Representatives
- Considered by: Australian Senate
- Assented to: 26 March 2021
- Commenced: 27 March 2021

Legislative history

First chamber: Australian House of Representatives
- Bill title: Fair Work Amendment (Supporting Australia’s Jobs and Economic Recovery) Bill 2020
- Introduced by: Christian Porter MP, Attorney-General, Minister for Industrial Relations and Leader of the House
- Introduced: 11 December 2020
- First reading: 9 December 2020
- Second reading: 23 February 2021
- Third reading: 23 February 2021

Second chamber: Australian Senate
- Member(s) in charge: Jonathon Duniam, Assistant Minister for Forestry and Fisheries and Assistant Minister for Industry Development
- First reading: 25 February 2021
- Second reading: 18 March 2021
- Third reading: 18 March 2021
- Status: In force

The Fair Work Amendment (Supporting Australia’s Jobs and Economic Recovery) Act 2021 (Cth) is an act of the Parliament of Australia, which brought about considerable amendments to the Fair Work Act 2009. Prior to its passing, the legislation was considered to be the most significant industrial relations reform since the original at's passage. It was also first reform of industrial relations passed by a Coalition government since the WorkChoices legislation of the Howard government.

== The Act ==
=== Defining casual employment ===
The Act's most significant reform was the defining of casual employment, confirming that casual employment will exist if:

- Employment was offered on the basis an employer made no firm advance commitment to continuing and indefinite work according to an agreed pattern of work,
- The employee accepts the offer of employment on that basis, and
- The employment is as a result of that acceptance.

=== Casual conversion ===
The Act provides for landmark reform to casual conversion, requiring the offer of casual employment generally to be made to an employee working for 12 months or more with the last six months working a regular pattern of hours which could be worked as permanent.
