= National Right (Liberal Party of Australia) =

Right-wing faction of the conservative Liberal Party of Australia

National Right Faction Hard Right, National Right, Conservatives
- Ideology: Australian nationalism; Right-wing populism; Conservatism (Australian); Social conservatism
- Political position: Right-wing
- Associated party: Liberal
- Colours: Blue
- House of Representatives: 14 / 27 (2025 seats)
- Senate: 11 / 23 (2025 seats)

The National Right, also known as the Conservatives, or the Hard Right, is one of three factions within the federal Liberal Party of Australia. Reportedly concerned more with social issues, the faction is the largest, traditionally most organised and the furthest right-leaning of the three. The current leader of the Liberal Party, Angus Taylor, is from the National Right faction.

During the prime ministership of Malcolm Turnbull, the faction (of which Turnbull was not a member) rose in size and influence, and between 2019–2022 it underwent a change of leadership, but lost many prominent members, including Tony Abbott, Eric Abetz and Kevin Andrews, as well as former Liberal Party Senators Cory Bernardi and Mathias Cormann.

The faction has the largest and most of the young membership out of all the Factions, with Andrew Hastie, James Paterson, Phillip Thompson, Jonathon Duniam, Henry Pike, Ben Small, Jacinta Nampijinpa Price, Jessica Collins, Aaron Violi, Simon Kennedy, and Claire Chandler all being millennials. Furthermore, former New South Wales Premier, Dominic Perrottet, is from the faction.

After faction member and party leader Peter Dutton lost the 2025 Australian federal election the faction underwent a significant change in leadership as Michael Sukkar (faction boss) and Dutton himself both lost their seats. However, the faction maintained its position as the largest faction as the Moderates and Centre Right also had significant member losses. Furthermore, Angus Taylor, who is in the National Right faction, was defeated in a leadership election by Sussan Ley by 29 votes to 24. On 13 February 2026, Angus Taylor successfully challenged Sussan Ley to become leader of the Liberal Party nationally.

== Membership ==
=== Current MPs ===
Membership
Name	Constituency	Current shadow or former government positions	State or territory
Michaelia Cash	Senator for Western Australia	Opposition Leader in the Senate and Shadow Minister for Foreign Affairs Former minister for Women, Employment, Employment and Skills and Small/Family Business, Industrial Relations and Attorney General portfolios. Former Deputy Leader of Government in Senate	WA
Angus Taylor	Member for Hume	Leader of the Opposition Former Minister for Industry, Energy and Emissions Reduction, and Law Enforcement and Cybersecurity portfolios. Former Shadow Minister for Defence	NSW
Alex Antic	Senator for South Australia		SA
Andrew Hastie	Member for Canning		WA
James Paterson	Senator for Victoria	Shadow Minister for Finance, Public Service and Government Services	VIC
Garth Hamilton	Member for Groom		QLD
Slade Brockman	Senator for Western Australia	Former President of the Senate	WA
Phillip Thompson	Member for Herbert	Shadow Assistant Minister	QLD
Tony Pasin	Member for Barker		SA
Rick Wilson	Member for O'Connor		WA
Matt O'Sullivan	Senator for Western Australia	Shadow Minister for Choice in Childcare and Early Learning, Shadow Minister for Child Protection and the Prevention of Family Violence	WA
Jonathon Duniam	Senator for Tasmania	Shadow Minister for Education and Manager of Opposition Business in the Senate	TAS
Claire Chandler	Senator for Tasmania		TAS
Henry Pike	Member for Bowman		QLD
Ben Small	Member for Forrest		WA
Leah Blyth	Senator for South Australia	Shadow Assistant Minister	SA
Jacinta Nampijinpa Price	Senator for the Northern Territory		NT
Dan Tehan	Member for Wannon	Shadow Minister for Energy and Emissions Reduction Former Minister for Trade Tourism and Investment, Education, Social Services, Defence Personnel, Veterans' Affairs, and Defence Materiel portfolios.	VIC
Jessica Collins	Senator for New South Wales		NSW
Sarah Henderson	Senator for Victoria		VIC
Aaron Violi	Member for Casey		VIC
Simon Kennedy	Member for Cook	Shadow Assistant Minister	NSW
Tom Venning	Member for Grey		SA
Terry Young	Member for Longman		QLD
Cameron Caldwell	Member for Fadden		QLD

=== Former MPs ===
Membership (both houses)
Name	Constituency	Other positions	State or Territory
Tony Abbott	Member for Warringah (1994–2019)	Former Prime Minister of Australia	NSW
Eric Abetz	Senator for Tasmania (1994–2022)	Leader of the Government in the Senate (2013–15); Minister for Employment (2013–15); 2024 Tasmanian election candidate for Franklin	TAS
Concetta Fierravanti-Wells	Senator for New South Wales (2005–22)	Minister for International Development and the Pacific in the Turnbull Government (2016–18)	NSW
Kevin Andrews	Member for Menzies (1991–2022)	Former Minister for Defence; Former Minister for Social Services	VIC
Gerard Rennick	Senator for Queensland (2019–2024) (left the party)		QLD
Gladys Liu	Member for Chisholm (2019–22)		VIC
Amanda Stoker	Senator for Queensland (2018–22)	Former Assistant Minister to the Attorney-General	QLD
Nicolle Flint	Member for Boothby (2016–22)		SA
Christian Porter	Member for Pearce (2013–22)	Former Minister for Industry, Science and Technology; Former Attorney-General; Leader of the House; Former Minister for Industrial Relations; Former Minister for Social Services	WA
Zed Seselja	Former Senator for Australian Capital Territory (2013–22)	Former Minister for International Development and the Pacific; Assistant Minister for Social Services and Multicultural Affairs (2016–17)	ACT
Alan Tudge	Member for Aston (2010–23)	Minister for Education and Youth (2020–21); Minister for Population, Cities and Urban Infrastructure (2018–20); Minister for Citizenship and Multicultural Affairs (2017–18); Minister for Human Services (2016–17)	VIC
Mathias Cormann	Former Senator for Western Australia (2007–20)	Minister for Finance (2013–20); Leader of the Government in the Senate (2017–20)	WA
Peter Dutton	Member for Dickson (2001–25)	Leader of the Opposition (2022–2025)	QLD
Gavin Pearce	Member for Braddon (2019–2025)		TAS
Ian Goodenough	Member for Moore (2013–2024)		WA

== See also ==
- Liberal factions:
  - Moderate faction
  - Centre Right faction
- Lyons Forum (1992–2004) Conservative faction
- Conservatism in Australia
- Cory Bernardi
- Craig Kelly
