= Jonno Duniam =

Australian politician (born 1982)

Senator the Honourable Jonno Duniam
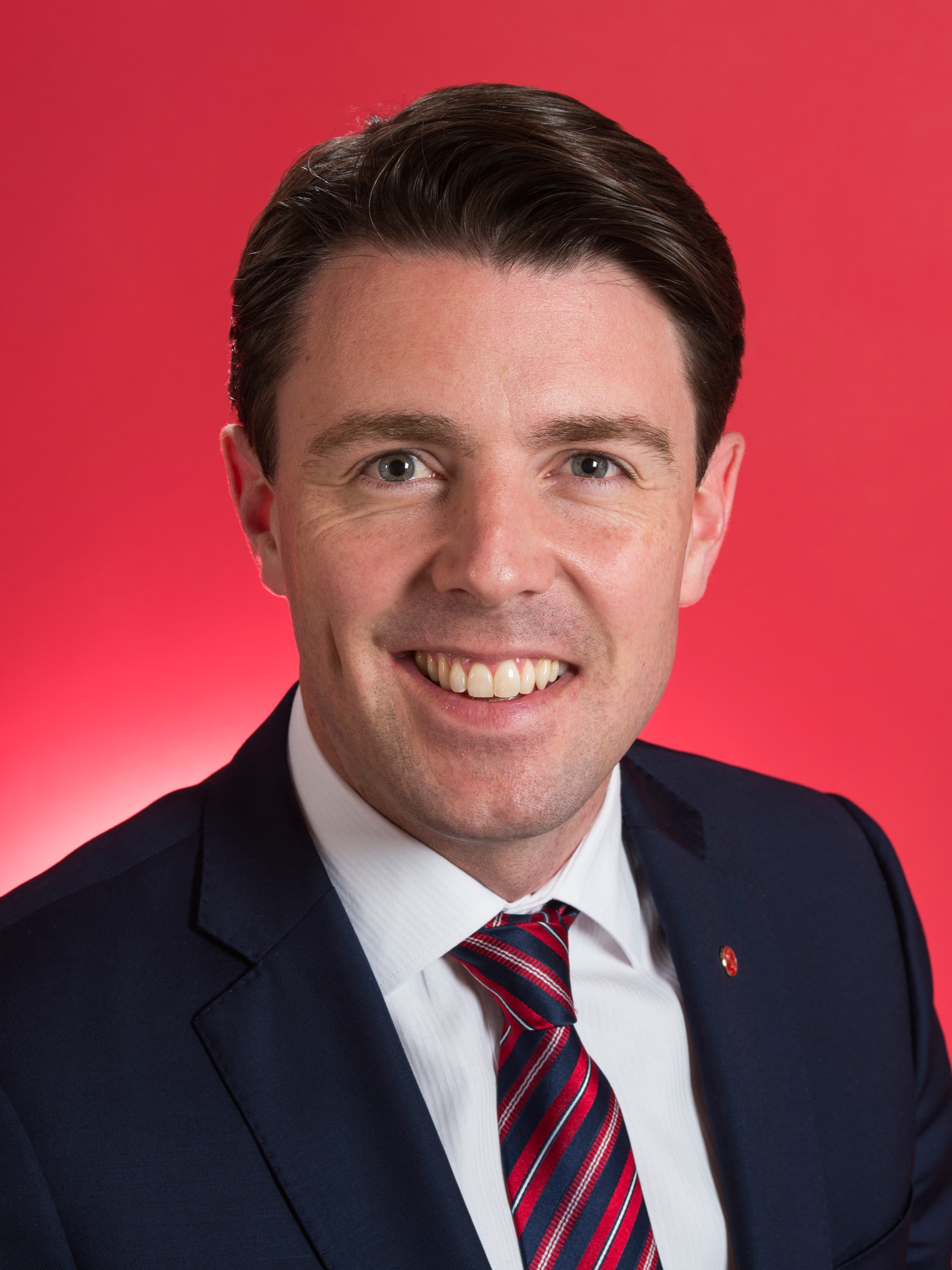
- Official portrait, 2017

Manager of Opposition Business in the Senate
- Incumbent
- Assumed office 17 February 2026
- Leader: Michaelia Cash
- Preceded by: Himself
- In office 25 January 2025 – 12 February 2026
- Leader: Michaelia Cash
- Preceded by: Anne Ruston
- Succeeded by: Himself

Shadow Minister for Immigration
- Incumbent
- Assumed office 17 February 2026
- Leader: Angus Taylor
- Preceded by: Paul Scarr

Shadow Minister for Home Affairs
- Incumbent
- Assumed office 17 February 2026
- Leader: Angus Taylor
- Preceded by: Himself
- In office 13 October 2025 – 12 February 2026
- Leader: Sussan Ley
- Preceded by: Andrew Hastie
- Succeeded by: Himself
Shadow ministerial positions
Shadow Minister for Education and Early Learning
In office 28 May 2025 – 13 October 2025
Leader	Sussan Ley
Preceded by	Sarah Henderson (as Shadow Minister for Education); Angie Bell (as Shadow Minister for Early Childhood Education)
Succeeded by	Julian Leeser
Shadow Minister for the Environment, Fisheries and Forestry
In office 5 June 2022 – 28 May 2025
Leader	Peter Dutton; Sussan Ley
Preceded by	Terri Butler (as Shadow Minister for the Environment and Water)
Succeeded by	Angie Bell (as Shadow Minister for the Environment); Ross Cadell (as Shadow Minister for Fisheries and Forestry)
Deputy Manager of Opposition Business in the Senate
In office 5 June 2022 – 25 January 2025
Leader	Simon Birmingham
Preceded by	Kimberley Kitching
Succeeded by	James McGrath
Ministerial positions
Assistant Minister for Industry Development
In office 22 December 2020 – 23 May 2022
Prime Minister	Scott Morrison
Minister	Karen Andrews (2019–21); Christian Porter (2021); Angus Taylor (2021–22)
Preceded by	Position established
Succeeded by	Tim Ayres (as Assistant Minister for Manufacturing)
Assistant Minister for Forestry and Fisheries
In office 29 May 2019 – 23 May 2022
Prime Minister	Scott Morrison
Minister	Bridget McKenzie (2019–20); Michael McCormack (acting in 2020); David Littleproud (2020–22)
Preceded by	Position established
Succeeded by	Position abolished
Assistant Minister for Regional Tourism
In office 29 May 2019 – 22 December 2020
Prime Minister	Scott Morrison
Minister	Marise Payne
Preceded by	Position established
Succeeded by	Position abolished

Senator for Tasmania
- Incumbent
- Assumed office 2 July 2016

Personal details
- Born: Jonathon Roy Duniam; 31 December 1982 (age 43) Launceston, Tasmania, Australia
- Party: Liberal
- Relations: Bob Graham (great-uncle)
- Education: University of Tasmania
- Occupation: Politician
- Website: duniam.com.au

Jonathon Roy "Jonno" Duniam (born 31 December 1982) is an Australian politician who has been a senator for Tasmania since 2016. A member of the Liberal Party, he served as an assistant minister in the Morrison government from 2019 to 2022. Prior to entering Parliament, Duniam was a political staffer, including as deputy chief of staff to Tasmanian premier Will Hodgman. In June 2026, Duniam announced his intention to resign from parliament before the end of the year, citing family reasons and the earlier Liberal leadership change as central to his decision.

== Early life ==
Duniam was born on 31 December 1982 in Launceston, Tasmania. He is the son of Mary (née Graham) and Roy Duniam, and is a sixth-generation Tasmanian. His mother has served on the Waratah-Wynyard Council, including as mayor. His maternal grandmother Iris Graham was the first woman elected to the Burnie City Council and an Australian Labor Party (ALP) candidate for the Tasmanian Legislative Council, although she later left the party. His mother's uncle Bob Graham was an ALP state government minister.

Duniam grew up in Somerset, Tasmania, attending Stella Maris Catholic Primary School and Marist Regional College in Burnie. He holds the combined degree of Bachelor of Arts and Bachelor of Laws from the University of Tasmania.

== Politics ==
Duniam joined the Liberal Party in 2001 and worked as a political staffer for over a decade prior to entering parliament. He worked as an electorate officer to Senator Paul Calvert (2003–2005), adviser to Senator Eric Abetz (2005–2009), chief of staff to Senator Stephen Parry (2009–2010), and deputy chief of staff to state leader Will Hodgman (2010–2016). Duniam also served as president of the University of Tasmania Liberal Club, as well as holding various party offices.

=== Parliament ===
In April 2016, Duniam was preselected in third position on the Liberal Party's Senate ticket for the 2016 federal election, ahead of incumbents David Bushby and Richard Colbeck. He resigned his position with Hodgman the following month. Despite a double dissolution resulting in twice as many seats being vacant, he was the only new Tasmanian senator to win election in 2016.

Duniam served on various Senate committees before being appointed Deputy Government Whip in the Senate in February 2019. After the Coalition's victory at the 2019 federal election, he was appointed Assistant Minister for Forestry and Fisheries and Assistant Minister for Regional Tourism in the Second Morrison Ministry. He relinquished the latter portfolio in December 2020 and was instead made Assistant Minister for Industry Development. He was also made Deputy Manager of Government Business in the Senate and held both positions until May 2022, when he left government following the election of the ALP and appointment of the Albanese ministry.

In April 2021, while being interviewed by Rita Panahi on Sky News, Duniam claimed that Greens senator, Sarah Hanson-Young, had exposed her young niece to danger by involving her in an environmental protest at a logging work site. The claim was false and Duniam apologised to Hanson-Young. Sky News agreed to pay $40,000, plus legal costs, to settle a defamation action brought by Hanson-Young.

In May 2021, Duniam defeated Eric Abetz for the first position on the Liberal Senate ticket in Tasmania at the 2022 federal election.

In June 2022, following the defeat of the Morrison Government, Duniam was appointed to Shadow Cabinet serving as Shadow Minister for Fisheries and Forestry and Shadow Minister for the Environment.

Duniam has been critical of the Albanese Government's decision to provide $8.2 million in taxpayer funding to the controversial "Environmental Defender's Office" (EDO). He has been particularly vocal against the role of the EDO in relation to salmon farming in Macquarie Harbour. Which was placed under consultation on 30 November 2023 by Environment Minister Tanya Plibersek, a decision against which Duniam has fought with the local community in Strahan.

On 14 June 2026, Duniam announced he would retire from politics by the end of the year. He stated that family reasons were central to his decision, noting he needed to prioritise family and that the earlier Liberal leadership change had "started to really wear on me" and helped "crystallise" his decision. Duniam also said, "Twenty-five years, a quarter of a century, devoted to politics I think is more than enough for anyone".

In August 2026, Duniam, along with Aaron Violi, Andrew Hastie, and Kate Chaney, initiated the Joint Select Committee on Artificial Intelligence, which was established on 20 August 2026.

=== Political views ===
Duniam is a member of the National Right faction of the Liberal Party.

In 2016, Duniam was reported as personally opposed to same-sex marriage but supportive of a referendum on the issue. During the Australian Marriage Law Postal Survey, he stated that he would vote "in accordance with the majority view of the public", subsequently voting in favour of the Marriage Amendment (Definition and Religious Freedoms) Act 2017.

During the 2018 Liberal Party of Australia leadership spills, Duniam refused to state whether he voted for incumbent prime minister Malcolm Turnbull or challenger Peter Dutton in the first vote. In the second vote days later, he reportedly voted for Dutton against Scott Morrison, with the latter emerging successful.

In 2023, Duniam campaigned against the Albanese Government's Indigenous Voice to Parliament and predicted that the majority of Tasmanians would vote against it.

== Personal life ==
As of 2017 Duniam had three children with his wife Anisa, whom he met at university, and lived on a "small acreage outside of Hobart". They started a child care centre in Hobart in 2016. His father-in-law Zekri Palushi is an Albanian cardiologist who sought asylum in Australia due to his political activities. His wife is related to other prominent Albanian anti-communists, including Catholic martyr Fran Mirakaj.

Duniam is a Christian and attends the Mount Stuart Presbyterian Church in Hobart.
