= Kevin Hogan (politician) =

Australian politician (born 1963)

The Honourable Kevin Hogan MP
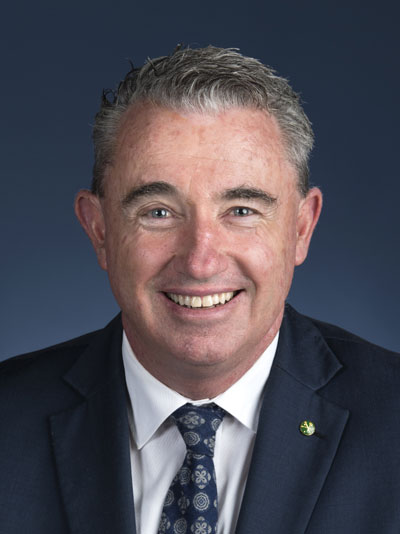
- Official portrait, 2019

Shadow Assistant Treasurer Shadow Minister for Financial Services
- Incumbent
- Assumed office 16 March 2026
- Leader: Angus Taylor
- Preceded by: Pat Conaghan

Deputy Manager of Opposition Business in the House of Representatives
- Incumbent
- Assumed office 17 February 2026
- Leader: Sussan Ley; Angus Taylor
- Preceded by: Position vacant
- In office 5 June 2022 – 21 January 2025
- Leader: Peter Dutton; Sussan Ley
- Preceded by: Mark Butler
- Succeeded by: Position vacant

Shadow Minister for Trade, Tourism and Investment Trade and Tourism (2022-2025)
- In office 17 February 2026 – 16 March 2026
- Leader: Angus Taylor
- Preceded by: Michaelia Cash (acting)
- Succeeded by: Matt Canavan
- In office 5 June 2022 – 21 January 2025
- Leader: Peter Dutton; Sussan Ley
- Preceded by: Don Farrell (as Shadow Minister for Tourism and Sport); Madeleine King (as Shadow Minister for Trade)
- Succeeded by: Michaelia Cash (acting)

Deputy Leader of the National Party
- In office 12 May 2025 – 11 March 2026
- Leader: David Littleproud
- Preceded by: Perin Davey
- Succeeded by: Darren Chester

Assistant Minister for Local Government
- In office 2 July 2021 – 23 May 2022
- Prime Minister: Scott Morrison
- Minister: Barnaby Joyce
- Preceded by: Position established
- Succeeded by: Position abolished

Assistant Minister to the Deputy Prime Minister
- In office 6 February 2020 – 23 May 2022
- Prime Minister: Scott Morrison
- Deputy Prime Minister: Michael McCormack; Barnaby Joyce
- Preceded by: Andrew Gee
- Succeeded by: Position abolished

Deputy Speaker of the House of Representatives
- In office 26 March 2018 – 10 February 2020
- Preceded by: Mark Coulton
- Succeeded by: Llew O'Brien

Nationals Whip in the House of Representatives
- In office 8 February 2018 – 26 March 2018
- Leader: Michael McCormack
- Chief Whip: Michelle Landry
- Preceded by: Michelle Landry
- Succeeded by: Llew O'Brien

Member of the Australian Parliament for Page
- Incumbent
- Assumed office 7 September 2013
- Preceded by: Janelle Saffin

Personal details
- Born: Kevin John Hogan; 11 August 1963 (age 63) Port Augusta, South Australia, Australia
- Party: National
- Spouse: Karen Webber
- Children: 3
- Education: Flinders University; Southern Cross University
- Occupation: Politician
- Profession: Economist
- Website: www.kevinhogan.com.au

Kevin John Hogan (born 11 August 1963) is an Australian politician who served as deputy leader of the National Party from May 2025 to March 2026. He has been a member of the House of Representatives since 2013, representing the Division of Page in New South Wales. He was an assistant minister in the Morrison government from 2020 to 2022.

== Early life ==
Hogan was born in Port Augusta in regional South Australia. After completing a Bachelor of Economics degree at Flinders University, he began a career in finance. He moved to Sydney and worked for an official money market dealer, GIO Securities, dealing with the Reserve Bank of Australia on a daily basis. Hogan then went on to work with Colonial First State for ten years. In this role he managed a multibillion-dollar portfolio and appeared on Sky News Australia every morning giving an economic update. He was also for a period an Investment Officer for an Industry Super Fund.

Hogan married his wife Karen they returned to Karen's home town of Lismore.

He then operated his own consultancy business and runs a small cattle property outside Lismore.

== Career ==
Hogan ran as the Nationals candidate for the Division of Page at the 2010 election, but was defeated by the incumbent Australian Labor Party candidate Janelle Saffin. He re-contested the bellwether seat at the 2013 election. He secured a two-party-preferred swing of 6.7 points – almost twice the national average of 3.6 points, finishing with a margin of 2.5 points. He was re-elected at the 2016 election with a margin of 2.3%.

On 26 March 2018, the House of Representatives elected Hogan as Deputy Speaker.

Following Peter Dutton's unsuccessful attempt to oust Malcolm Turnbull as leader of the Liberal Party and Prime Minister, Hogan announced that he would move to the crossbench if the Liberals called for another spill before the next election. He made good on his promise on 24 August, when Turnbull resigned the leadership rather than face a second spill, which resulted in Scott Morrison becoming prime minister. Hogan called himself an "Independent National"; while he sat on the crossbench, he continued to support the Coalition on confidence and supply matters, and remained in the National party room. Nationals leader and Deputy Prime Minister Michael McCormack said that Hogan remained a member of the Nationals in good standing. McCormack also stated that Hogan would have the Nationals' full support if he sought re-election as a National at the next federal election.

Hogan sought re-election as a National in 2019, and was re-elected with a healthy swing of seven percent, enough to technically make Page a safe National seat. In a statement published on his own website on 21 May 2019, Hogan announced that he was returning to the Coalition benches, saying that he was satisfied that rule changes in the Liberal Party to discourage challenges to sitting prime ministers would end the instability that had caused him to withdraw from the Coalition in protest, and that the recent election results showed that the public wanted a Coalition government.

In February 2020, Hogan was promoted to the Morrison Ministry as the Assistant Minister to the Deputy Prime Minister.

In the 2022 election, Hogan was returned for a fourth term. Despite the swing against the Coalition, Hogan had a 1.3% swing to him winning the seat of Page with a 10.7% margin. This was the first time Page was held by a member of the Opposition since 1987.

Hogan was appointed Shadow Minister for Trade and Tourism and Deputy Manager of Opposition Business in June 2022.

Hogan was re-elected in 2025 with a margin of 9.3% and was elected Deputy Leader of the Nationals Party at the party's 2025 post-election leadership spill.

Australian House of Representatives
Preceded by Janelle Saffin	Member for Page; 2013–present	Incumbent
Preceded by Mark Coulton	Deputy Speaker of the House of Representatives; 2018–2020	Succeeded by Llew O'Brien
