= James Paterson (Australian politician) =

Australian politician (born 1987)

Senator James Paterson
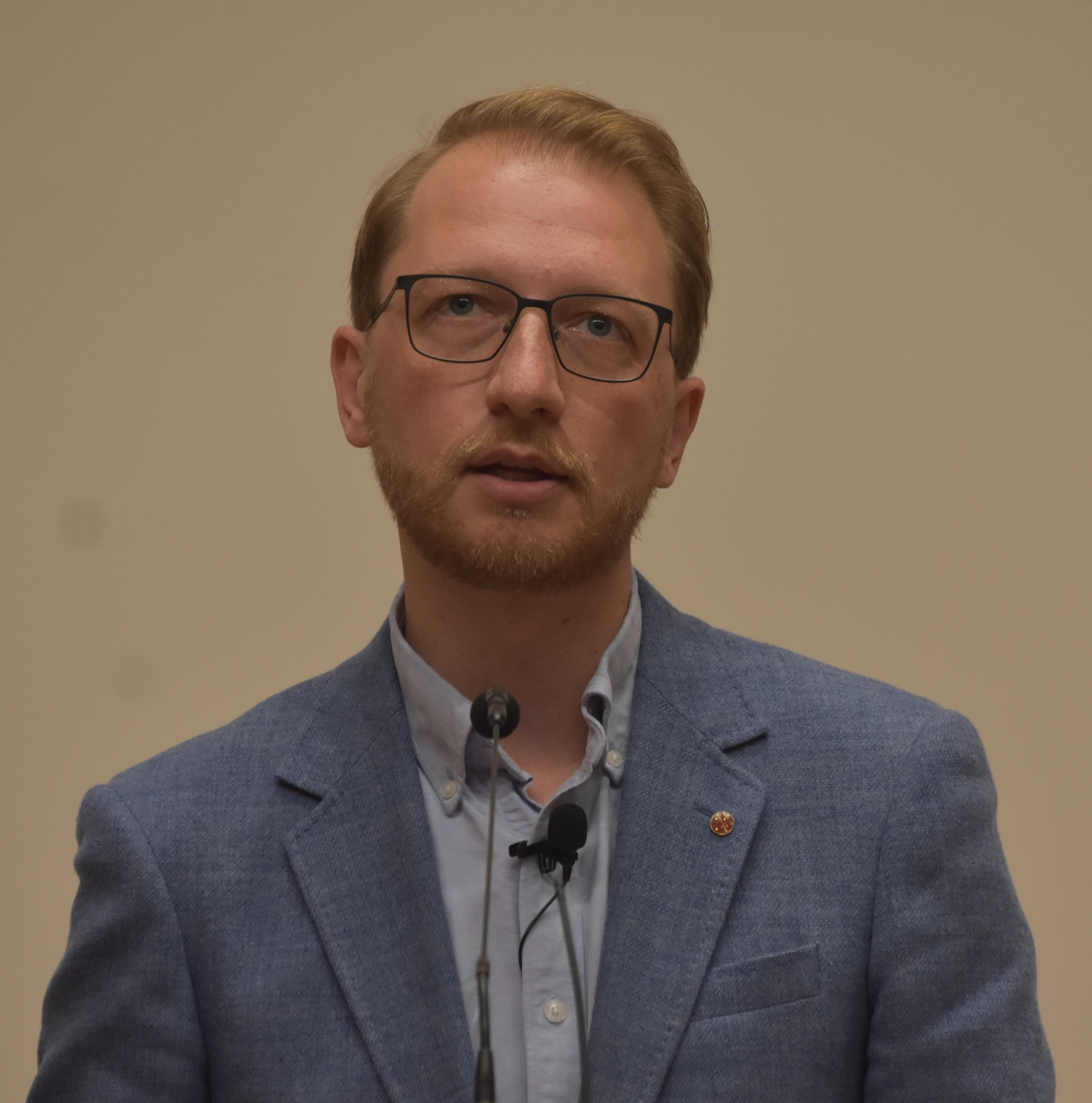
- Paterson in 2025

Shadow Minister for Defence
- Incumbent
- Assumed office 17 February 2026
- Leader: Angus Taylor
- Preceded by: Angus Taylor
Previous shadow ministerial offices
Shadow Minister for Finance Shadow Minister for the Public Service
In office 28 May 2025 – 12 February 2026
Leader	Sussan Ley
Preceded by	Jane Hume
Succeeded by	Claire Chandler
Shadow Minister for Government Services
In office 28 May 2025 – 12 February 2026
Leader	Sussan Ley
Preceded by	Claire Chandler (as Shadow Minister for Government Services and the Digital Economy)
Succeeded by	Claire Chandler
Shadow Cabinet Secretary
In office 5 March 2024 – 28 May 2025
Leader	Peter Dutton; Sussan Ley
Preceded by	Marise Payne
Succeeded by	Andrew Wallace
Shadow Minister for Home Affairs
In office 18 April 2023 – 28 May 2025
Leader	Peter Dutton; Sussan Ley
Preceded by	Karen Andrews
Succeeded by	Andrew Hastie
Shadow Minister for Cyber Security
In office 5 June 2022 – 28 May 2025
Leader	Peter Dutton; Sussan Ley
Preceded by	Tim Watts (as Shadow Assistant Minister for Communications and Cyber Security)
Succeeded by	Melissa Price
Shadow Minister for Countering Foreign Interference
In office 5 June 2022 – 18 April 2023
Leader	Peter Dutton
Preceded by	Position established
Succeeded by	Position abolished

Senator for Victoria
- Incumbent
- Assumed office 9 March 2016
- Preceded by: Michael Ronaldson

Personal details
- Born: James William Paterson; 21 November 1987 (age 38) Melbourne, Victoria, Australia
- Party: Liberal
- Education: University of Melbourne

James William Paterson (born 21 November 1987) is an Australian politician, currently serving as the Shadow Minister for Defence. A member of the Liberal Party, he has been a senator for Victoria since 2016.

== Early life ==
Paterson was born in Melbourne on 21 November 1987. He attended what he described as a "hippie" school in Melbourne's outer suburbs, and also briefly attended an elementary school in Washington, D.C., USA, while his mother undertook an academic exchange. He completed high school at McKinnon Secondary College.

Paterson completed the degrees of Bachelor of Arts and Bachelor of Commerce at the University of Melbourne. He worked briefly as a special adviser to Senator Mitch Fifield and for several months as an intern for U.S. congressman Lincoln Díaz-Balart. He then worked as a writer for the Victorian Employers' Chamber of Commerce and Industry (VECCI) before joining the Institute of Public Affairs (IPA) as editor of the IPA Review publication. In the IPA, Paterson was promoted to director of communications and development, before being promoted to deputy executive director in September 2014.

== Politics ==
Paterson joined the Liberal Party at the age of 17, despite coming from "a Labor or Greens-voting family of long-time trade union members". He was heavily involved in student politics as vice-president of the Melbourne University Liberal Club (2008–2009), vice-president of the Australian Liberal Students' Federation (2008–2009), and state president of the Young Liberals (2009).

In March 2016, the Victorian division of the Liberal Party of Australia nominated Paterson to fill the casual vacancy in the Senate caused by the resignation of Michael Ronaldson. Paterson was appointed by a joint sitting of the Parliament of Victoria on 9 March 2016.

In October 2016, Paterson caused some controversy with his suggestion that the Australian government sell Blue Poles, a painting by American artist Jackson Pollock which had been purchased by the National Gallery of Australia in 1973. Paterson argued that proceeds from the sale of the painting, then estimated to be worth $350 million Australian dollars, could be used to repay the Australian government's debt.

Paterson and Liberal colleague Andrew Hastie were denied entry into China for a study tour in November 2019. Some believe this is due to criticism the pair has raised about Chinese actions towards the Uighurs in Xinjiang province as well as attempted influencing of opinion about China within Australia. In 2022, Paterson travelled to Washington as the new Australian Co-chair for the Inter-Parliamentary Alliance on China in 2022; the grouping works to ensure an ascendant Communist China does not shape the decisions and values of the world's democracies.

In 2021, Paterson was elected Chair of the Parliamentary Joint Committee on Intelligence and Security following Andrew Hastie's appointment as Assistant Minister for Defence.

=== Shadow ministry ===
Following the Liberal–National Coalition's defeat at the 2022 general election, Paterson was appointed the Shadow Minister for Cyber Security and the Shadow Minister for Countering Foreign Interference by Opposition Leader Peter Dutton.

In April 2023, Paterson was appointed as the Shadow Minister for Home Affairs and the Shadow Minister for Cyber Security.

In 2024, Paterson added Shadow Cabinet Secretary to his portfolio responsibilities.

Following another defeat at the 2025 election in a historic landslide, Paterson was appointed the Shadow Minister for Finance, Shadow Minister for Government Services and the Shadow Minister for the Public Service by Opposition Leader Sussan Ley. Following Ley's resignation, under the Taylor shadow ministry, Paterson was appointed as the Shadow Minister of Defence.

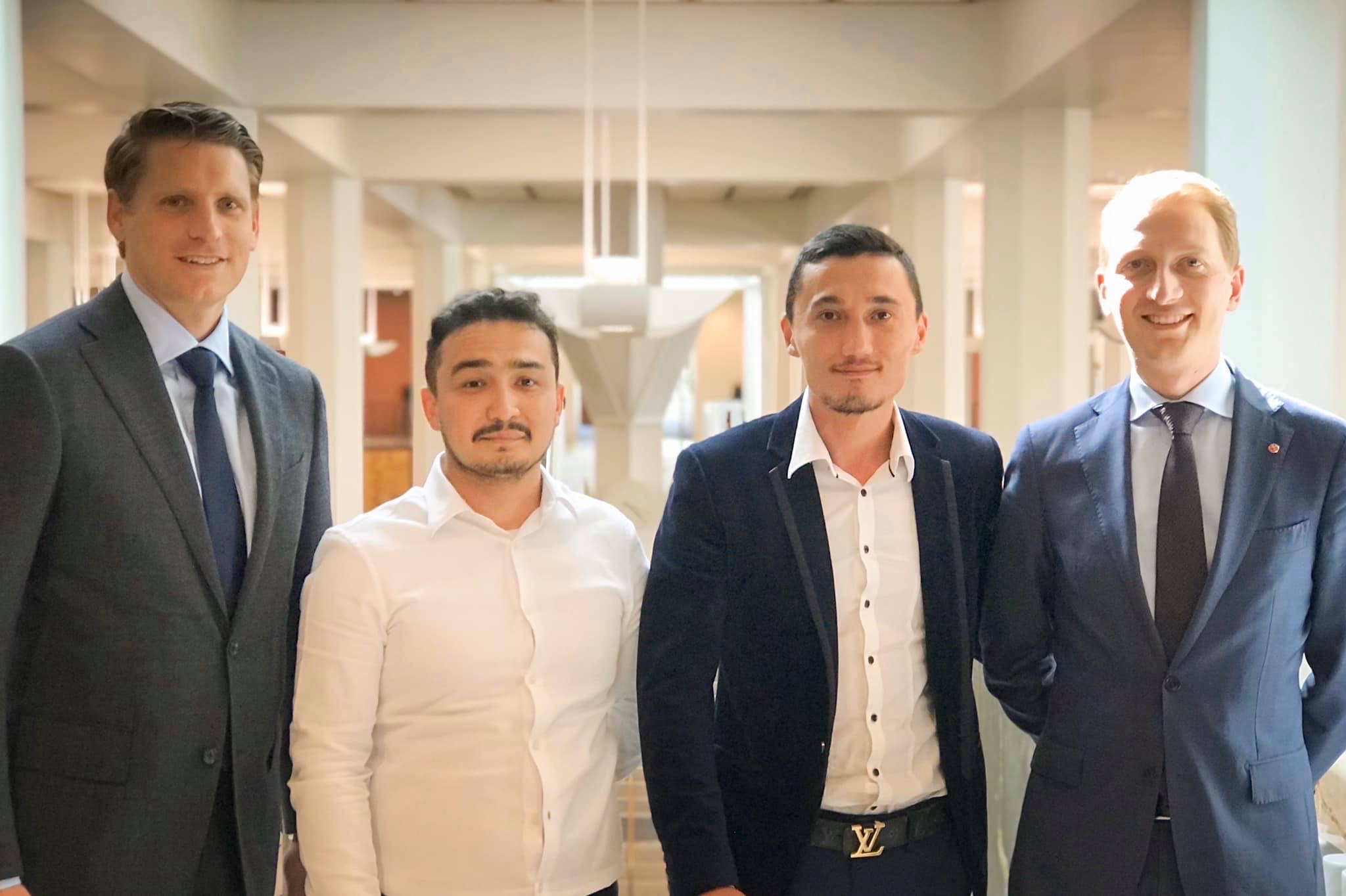
Paterson on right, meeting with Uyghurs delegates and Andrew Hastie, at the Parliament of Australia, November 2019.

== Political positions ==
Paterson is aligned with the national right faction of the Liberal Party. Coming from the Institute of Public Affairs (IPA) where he was a fellow, Paterson has been associated with Libertarian elements of Liberal Party, who put a strong emphasis on freedom of speech as well as free markets. He has sought reform to section 18C of the Racial Vilification Act 1996 to remove elements that may restrict free speech.

=== Foreign policy ===
On global matters, Paterson has been an advocate for human rights of religious and ethnic minority groups and a strong critic of China. Paterson expressed his support of Brexit, and a freedom of movement deal between Canada, Australia, New Zealand and the United Kingdom (CANZUK).

=== Same-sex marriage ===
In August 2017, Paterson described himself as a supporter of same-sex marriage, and during the Australian Marriage Law Postal Survey he drafted a same-sex marriage bill as an alternative to one proposed by Senator Dean Smith. He later backed down from putting up a bill.

== Personal life ==
Paterson met his wife Lydia at a Liberal student function. The couple had two children as of 2021.

Paterson is an agnostic and has described himself as "not religious at all", although his wife is Catholic and his children were baptised as Catholics.
