= Julian Leeser =

Australian politician (born 1976)

Julian Leeser MP
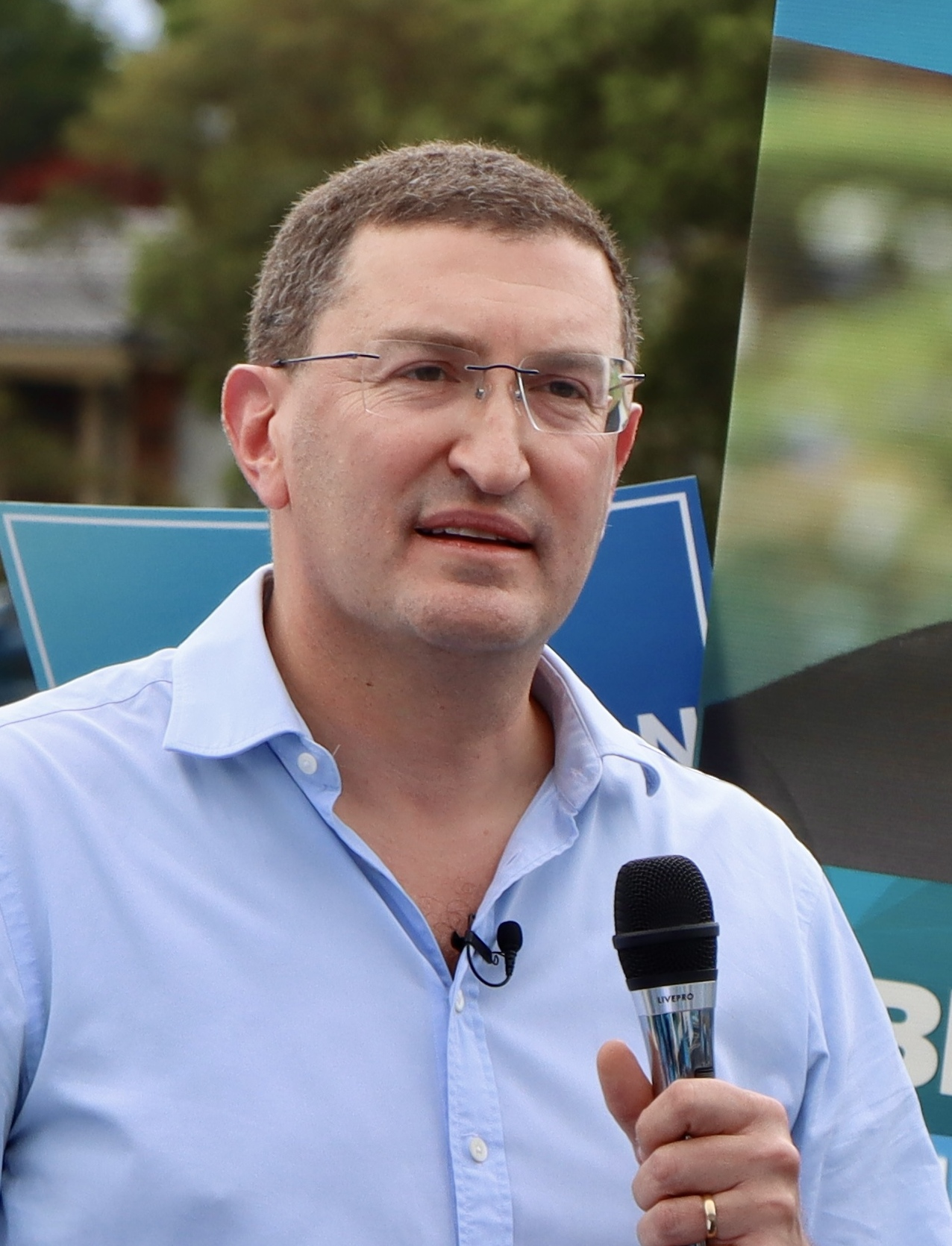
- Leeser in 2024

Shadow Minister for Education
- Incumbent
- Assumed office 17 February 2026
- Leader: Angus Taylor
- Preceded by: Himself (as Shadow Minister for Education and Early Learning)

Shadow Minister for Indigenous Australians
- Incumbent
- Assumed office 17 February 2026
- Leader: Angus Taylor
- Preceded by: Kerrynne Liddle
- In office 5 June 2022 – 11 April 2023
- Leader: Peter Dutton
- Preceded by: Linda Burney
- Succeeded by: Jacinta Nampijinpa Price
Previous shadow ministerial offices
Shadow Minister for Education and Early Learning
In office 13 October 2025 – 17 February 2026
| Leader | Sussan Ley |
| Preceded by | Jonathon Duniam |
| Succeeded by | Himself (as Shadow Minister for Education); Matt O'Sullivan (as Shadow Minister for Choice in Childcare and Early Learning) |
Shadow Minister for the Arts
In office 28 May 2025 – 17 February 2026
| Leader | Sussan Ley |
| Preceded by | Claire Chandler (as Shadow Minister for Science and the Arts) |
Shadow Attorney-General
In office 28 May 2025 – 13 October 2025
| Leader | Sussan Ley |
| Preceded by | Michaelia Cash |
| Succeeded by | Andrew Wallace |
In office 5 June 2022 – 11 April 2023
| Leader | Peter Dutton |
| Preceded by | Mark Dreyfus |
| Succeeded by | Michaelia Cash |
Shadow Assistant Minister for Foreign Affairs
In office 25 January 2025 – 28 May 2025
| Leader | Peter Dutton; Sussan Ley |
| Shadow Minister | David Coleman |
| Preceded by | Claire Chandler |
| Succeeded by | Dean Smith (as Shadow Assistant Minister for Foreign Affairs and Trade) |

Member of the Australian Parliament for Berowra
- Incumbent
- Assumed office 2 July 2016
- Preceded by: Philip Ruddock

Councillor of Woollahra Municipal Council for Bellevue Hill Ward
- In office 9 September 1995 – 11 September 1999

Personal details
- Born: 25 May 1976 (age 50) Sydney, New South Wales, Australia
- Party: Liberal
- Education: Cranbrook School, Sydney
- Alma mater: University of New South Wales
- Occupation: Solicitor
- Profession: Lawyer and politician
- Website: www.liberal.org.au/member/julian-leeser

Julian Martin Leeser (born 25 May 1976) is an Australian politician who has served as Shadow Minister for Education and Shadow Minister for Indigenous Australians under Angus Taylor since February 2026. A member of the Liberal Party, he has represented the Division of Berowra in the Australian House of Representatives since the 2016 federal election.

== Early life ==
Leeser was born in Sydney. His father John, an accountant, was the son of Jewish refugees from Nazi Germany, while his mother Sylvia is a fifth-generation Australian whose father was a survivor of the Burma Railway.

Leeser attended Cranbrook School, Sydney. He holds the degrees of Bachelor of Arts (Hons.) and Bachelor of Laws from the University of New South Wales. He sat on Woollahra Council for Bellevue Hill Ward from 1995 to 1999 as an independent. Aged 19 at the time, he was estimated to be the youngest local councillor elected in NSW history. In 1999, he served as a member of Prime Minister John Howard's No campaign during the republic referendum. In 2000, he was an associate to Justice Ian Callinan of the High Court of Australia.

== Career ==
Leeser worked as an adviser for Minister for Workplace Relations Tony Abbott in 2001 and for Philip Ruddock between 2004 and 2006. He worked as a solicitor for Mallesons Stephen Jaques between 2002 and 2004. In 2006 he joined the Menzies Research Centre as executive director, before becoming Director of Government Policy & Strategy at the Australian Catholic University in July 2012.

Leeser has written several articles defending the legacy of Prime Minister William McMahon, as well as an obituary of McMahon's wife Sonia for The Australian. He authored McMahon's entry in the Australian Dictionary of Biography, and as of 2016 was working on a full-length biography.

== Parliament ==
Leeser joined the Liberal Party in 1992 and served as vice-president of the Liberal Party of Australia, New South Wales Division from 2015 to 2016. In April 2016 he won Liberal preselection for the safe seat of Berowra. He was elected to parliament at the 2016 federal election, succeeding the retiring Philip Ruddock in Berowra. In his maiden speech he spoke of the impact of his father's suicide when he was 20 years old.

After the 2019 election Leeser became chair of the Joint Standing Committee on Migration and the House of Representatives Standing Committee on Indigenous Affairs.

After the 2022 election, Leeser was elevated to Peter Dutton's shadow ministry as the Shadow Attorney-General and Shadow Minister for Indigenous Australians. He resigned from shadow cabinet in April 2023 after the Liberal Party resolved to support the "No" vote at the 2023 Australian Indigenous Voice referendum.

=== Political views ===
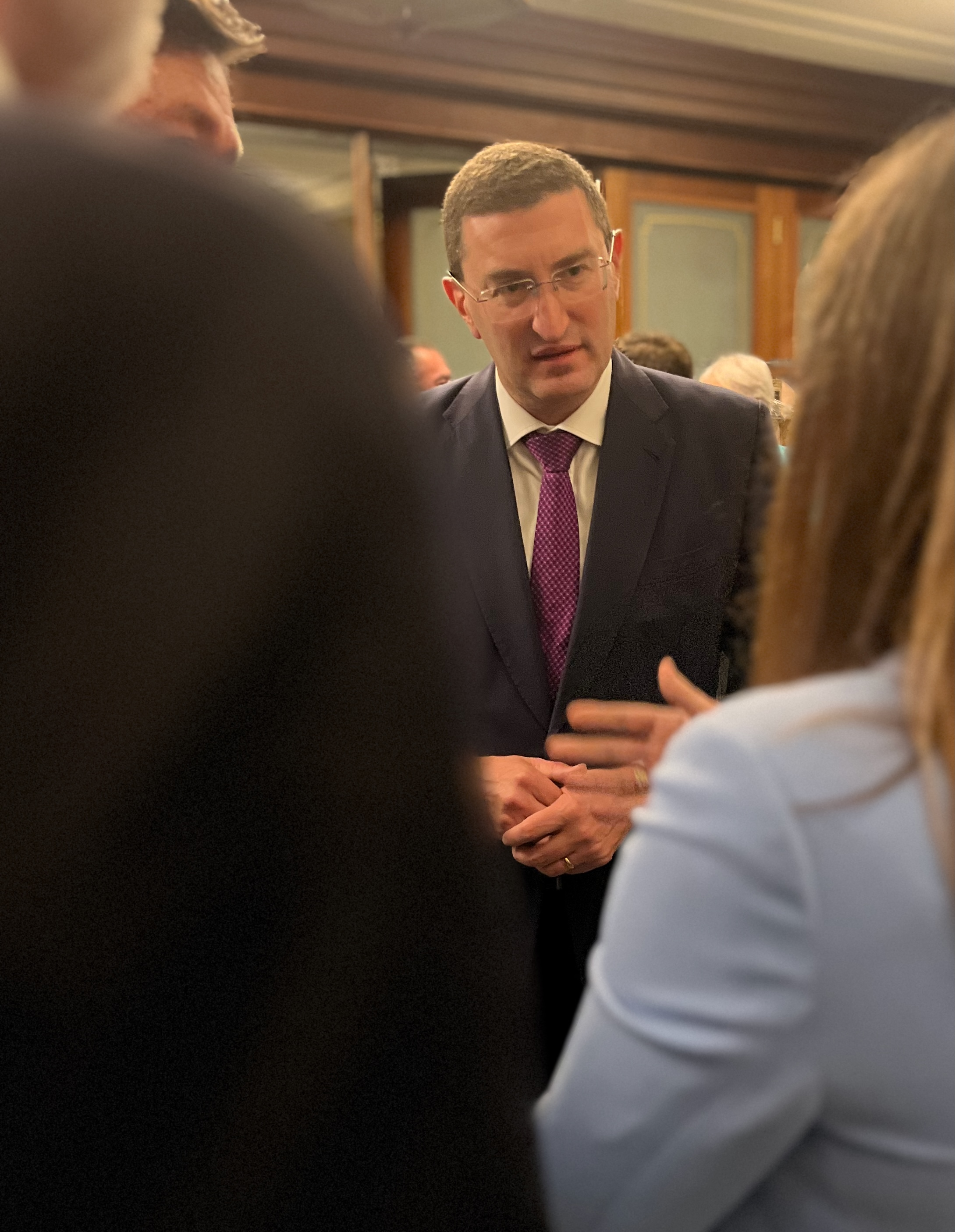
Leeser at a Parliamentary function in Canberra, 2024

Leeser has been identified as a member of the Liberal Party's moderate faction.

Leeser supports Australian recognition of West Jerusalem as capital of Israel, as implemented by the Morrison government in 2018. In October 2022, he described the Albanese government's decision to reverse the Morrison government's stance as "shambolic". The following month, he and deputy Liberal leader Sussan Ley travelled to Israel to "reaffirm the Coalition's commitment to West Jerusalem as the nation's capital", in a trip organised by the Australia/Israel & Jewish Affairs Council.

Following the 2023 Hamas attack on Israel and resulting Gaza war, Leeser called on Australia to suspend its diplomatic relations with Iran, which he said had been "deeply involved" in the attack and was a "criminal regime". He subsequently announced that he would wear a kippah in federal parliament for one week as a statement against increased anti-semitism in Australia. In November 2023, in response to protests in Australia against the Gaza war, Leeser called for the New South Wales state government to ban vehicle convoys from carrying Palestinian flags, stating that drivers who participate in pro-Palestinian vehicle convoys should have their licences cancelled and their vehicles impounded.

In January 2025, following a rise in antisemitic incidents in Australia, Leeser called for mandatory jail sentences for people convicted of vandalising Jewish sites, stating that "people need to know that if you graffiti a synagogue or a Jewish communal property, you will go to jail".

== Personal life ==
Leeser is married to Joanna Davidson and has two children. He lives with his family in Thornleigh. Leeser is the first Jewish Liberal member of the House of Representatives from New South Wales and a member of the Emanuel Synagogue in Woollahra.

Non-profit organization positions
| Preceded by Jason Bryant | Executive Director of Menzies Research Centre; 2006–2012 | Succeeded by Professor Donald Markwell |
Parliament of Australia
| Preceded by Philip Ruddock | Member for Berowra; 2016–present | Incumbent |
