= Shadow cabinet (Australia) =

Counterpart to the prime minister of Australia

In Australian federal politics, the shadow cabinet is the opposition's equivalent to the federal cabinet. It comprises the most senior figures within the opposition, headed by the leader of the opposition as the counterpart to the prime minister of Australia.

The shadow cabinet is the highest level of the shadow ministry (or "opposition frontbench"), which also includes other less senior shadow ministers (equivalent to the government's "outer ministry") and shadow assistant ministers. The members of the shadow ministry are assigned one or more portfolios, usually though not necessarily corresponding to an existing ministerial portfolio within the government. They serve as the opposition's chief spokespeople on matters within their portfolio, and during parliamentary question time may direct questions at their government equivalent. If the opposition forms government, such as through winning a federal election, it is typical for members of the shadow ministry to retain the same portfolio.

The current shadow cabinet was formed by the Coalition in February 2026, led by Liberal opposition leader Angus Taylor.

== Role and functions ==
According to Bateman (2008), the shadow cabinet exists as a "recognised component of the parliamentary system" but "the functions, roles and practices of the Shadow Cabinet are far less clear than those of the Cabinet".

The role of the shadow ministry in making opposition policy has varied.

Meetings of shadow cabinet are less formal than actual cabinet meetings, typically lasting a shorter time.

Many of the characteristics of the cabinet also apply to the shadow cabinet, such as shadow cabinet collective responsibility.

== History ==
In May 1965, the Australian Labor Party Caucus voted to establish a formal shadow ministry of 25 members. This replaced an earlier "opposition executive" consisting of 14 members.

Since 1987, the shadow ministry has had at least as many members as the ministry, and sometimes more. Shadow parliamentary secretaries (known as shadow assistant ministers since 2016) were first appointed in 1990.

== Current arrangement ==
Party	Shadow Minister	Portrait	Offices	Ref
Liberal	Hon Angus Taylor (born 1966) MP for Hume (NSW) (2013–)		Leader of the Opposition; Leader of the Liberal Party	
Liberal	Hon Jane Hume (born 1971) Senator for Victoria (2016–)		Deputy Leader of the Opposition; Deputy Leader of the Liberal Party	
National (LNP)	Hon David Littleproud (born 1976) MP for Maranoa (Qld.) (2016–)		Leader of the National Party	
National	Hon Kevin Hogan (born 1963) MP for Page (NSW) (2013–)		Deputy Leader of the National Party	

== Salary and benefits ==
As of July 2019, ordinary shadow ministers were entitled to either a 20 or 25 percent loading on top of the base parliamentary salary. The loading depends on the number of shadow ministers. Officeholders within the opposition receive higher loadings, up to 87 percent for the leader of the opposition. Historically, ordinary shadow ministers received no additional salary compared to backbenchers but were granted an additional staffing allowance.

== See also ==
- Taylor shadow ministry - current shadow ministry since February 2026
- Leader of the Opposition in the Senate
- Manager of Opposition Business in the House
- Manager of Opposition Business in the Senate

== Sources ==
- Bateman, Joel (2008). In the shadows: the Shadow Cabinet in Australia (PDF). Australian Parliamentary Library. ISBN 9780980655407. Archived from the original (PDF) on 18 March 2012.
