= Ross Cadell =

Australian politician

Senator Ross Cadell

Senator for New South Wales
- Incumbent
- Assumed office 1st July 2022
- Preceded by: Concetta Fierravanti-Wells

Personal details
- Born: 4 April 1969 (age 57) Waratah, New South Wales, Australia
- Party: National
- Education: University of Newcastle

Ross Cadell (born 4 April 1969) is an Australian politician. He is a member of the National Party and was elected to the Senate on the Coalition's ticket in New South Wales at the 2022 federal election, to a term beginning on 1 July 2022. He was previously the state director of the party in New South Wales.

== Career ==
Cadell was the event manager for the Newcastle National Maritime Festival from 2002 to 2004. He subsequently worked in motorsport sponsorship, including as manager for former F1 driver Alex Yoong, before joining National Rugby League (NRL) team Newcastle Knights as sponsorship manager in June 2005. He later became commercial director of Prodigy Motorsport, a Newcastle-based motorsport team that sought to enter the V8 Supercars.

In 2020, Cadell was hired by the Port of Newcastle as special projects director. He was tasked with lobbying the New South Wales state government for the development of a deepwater freight container terminal in Newcastle.

== Politics ==
Cadell was elected state president of the Young Liberals in 1998. He later joined the National Party, working for the party as an organiser and campaign manager from 2010. He was involved in several state and federal election campaigns, as well as managing Barnaby Joyce's campaign at the 2017 New England by-election. He was appointed state director of the party in 2018, serving until 2020.

In June 2021, Cadell won preselection as the National Party's lead Senate candidate in New South Wales for the 2022 federal election. He was placed second on the joint Coalition ticket with the Liberal Party, defeating former party leader and deputy prime minister John Anderson in the preselection ballot. He was elected to a six-year Senate term beginning on 1 July 2022.

Cadell was promoted to the shadow cabinet following the 2025 election, with responsibility for the portfolios of water, emergency management, and fisheries and forestry.

In January 2026, following a recall of parliament to vote on the Combatting Antisemitism, Hate and Extremism (Criminal and Migration Laws) Bill 2026, Cadell resigned from the Ley shadow ministry after crossing the floor to vote against the official Liberal–National Coalition position on the hate speech law.

In September 2026, Cadell again won preselection for the next federal election, joined on the ticket by Michael McCormack advisor, Olivia McCormack.

== Personal Life ==
Cadell was born on 4 April 1969 in Waratah, New South Wales.. He currently lives in the Lake Macquarie area, he is married with four children.
