= Claire Chandler =

Australian politician (born 1990)

Senator Claire Chandler
- Chandler in 2021

Shadow Minister for Finance Shadow Minister for the Public Service Shadow Minister for Government Services
- Incumbent
- Assumed office 17 February 2026
- Leader: Angus Taylor
- Preceded by: James Paterson
Previous shadow ministerial offices
Shadow Minister for Cyber Security
In office 14 September 2025 – 17 February 2026
Leader	Sussan Ley
Preceded by	Melissa Price
Succeeded by	Aaron Violi
Shadow Minister for Science
In office 14 September 2025 – 17 February 2026
Leader	Sussan Ley
Preceded by	Melissa Price
Succeeded by	Aaron Violi (as Shadow Minister for Science, Technology and Innovation)
Shadow Minister for Science and the Arts
In office 25 January 2025 – 28 May 2025
Leader	Peter Dutton; Sussan Ley
Preceded by	Paul Fletcher
Succeeded by	Melissa Price (as Shadow Minister for Science); Julian Leeser (as Shadow Minister for the Arts)
Shadow Assistat Minister for Foreign Affairs
In office 5 June 2022 – 25 January 2025
Leader	Peter Dutton
Shadow Minister	Simon Birmingham
Preceded by	Position abolished
Succeeded by	Julian Leeser

Senator for Tasmania
- Incumbent
- Assumed office 1 July 2019

Personal details
- Born: 1 June 1990 (age 36) Hobart, Tasmania, Australia
- Party: Liberal
- Education: University of Tasmania (BA)
- Website: Official website

Claire Chandler (born 1 June 1990) is an Australian politician who was elected as a Senator for Tasmania at the 2019 federal election. She is a member of the Liberal Party, and is currently serving as the Shadow Minister for Finance and Government Services.

== Early life ==
Chandler grew up in the Huon Valley and attended St Michael's Collegiate, a Hobart private school for girls. She studied Arts and Law at the University of Tasmania where her interest in politics was furthered. At university she was a member of the University of Tasmania Liberal Club where she met her future husband Chris Edwards. Chandler later joined the Young Liberals and served as both the Tasmanian Division President, and Federal President.

After university, Chandler worked as an analyst in the Hobart office of Deloitte Risk Advisory from 2014 to 2016, as a senior analyst from 2016 to 2018, and as a client manager from 2018 to 2019. She worked at Deloitte until the 2019 election.

== Career ==
As Young Liberal President, Chandler led an internal review of the Tasmanian Division of the Liberal Party gender imbalance. Following the report, Chandler described the party's engagement with women as "sobering", but rejected the idea of gender quotas as a solution to fix the divide.

Chandler stood as a candidate for the seat of Franklin at the 2018 Tasmanian state election but was unsuccessful. Following the state election, she was preselected in the second position on the Liberal Party's Senate ticket in Tasmania on 9 September 2018, and was elected to the Senate at the 2019 federal election, for a term beginning on 1 July 2019. At the time, aged 29, Chandler was Australia's youngest female senator.

== Political positions ==
Chandler is a member of the National Right faction of the Liberal Party, and is a conservative.

=== Euthanasia ===
In 2018, Chandler said that she did not support euthanasia, and did not support attempts to legalise it in Tasmania. However, she was a supporter of the Liberal Party position of it being a conscience vote in parliament.

=== Transgender rights ===
Chandler is against the expansion of transgender rights. As an ardent campaigner for women's "sex-based rights", she advocates that women's sports, women's toilets, and women's change rooms are designed for, and should be reserved for, people of the female sex. In June 2021, Chandler appeared at an online event alongside Walt Heyer, an American de-transitioned activist who has called gender reassignment surgery a "modern-day frontal lobotomy".

Chandler criticised the attendance of 43 year old transgender weightlifter Laurel Hubbard at the 2020 Summer Olympics. Chandler argued that the International Olympic Committee's decision to allow Hubbard to compete in women's events had displaced 18 year old Roviel Detenamo who had stood to become the first female Nauruan Olympian in 20 years and exemplified "why it's so unfair to female athletes to allow males into their categories". However, Hubbard did not displace Detenamo, who was in a separate weightlifting category — Hubbard qualified in the Women's +87 kg, while Detenamo failed to qualify for the Women's 87 kg. In February 2022, Chandler introduced the Sex Discrimination and Other Legislation Amendment (Save Women's Sport) Bill 2022 to the Parliament of Australia.

Chandler also campaigns against the use of anti-discrimination laws and taxpayer funds to suppress free speech by those she calls "the woke".

== Personal life ==
Chandler lives in Tasmania. She married Chris Edwards in November 2018. Chandler is now separated from her husband.
