= Jane Hume =

Australian politician (born 1971)

Senator the Honourable Jane Hume
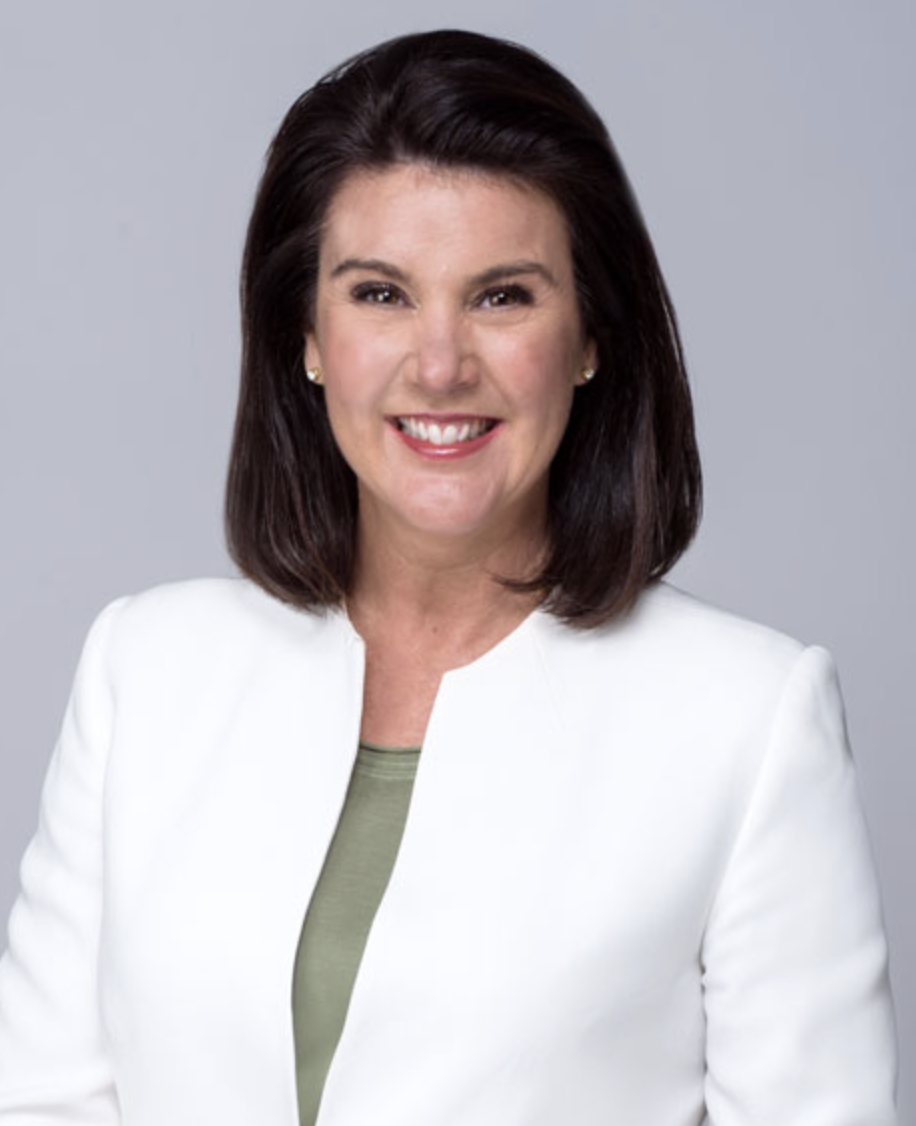
- Portrait, 2021

Deputy Leader of the Opposition
- Incumbent
- Assumed office 13 February 2026
- Leader: Angus Taylor
- Preceded by: Ted O'Brien

Deputy Leader of the Liberal Party
- Incumbent
- Assumed office 13 February 2026
- Leader: Angus Taylor
- Preceded by: Ted O’Brien

Shadow Minister for Employment and Workplace Relations
- Incumbent
- Assumed office 17 February 2026
- Leader: Angus Taylor
- Preceded by: Tim Wilson (as Shadow Minister for Industrial Relations and Employment)

Shadow Minister for Productivity and Deregulation
- Incumbent
- Assumed office 17 February 2026
- Leader: Angus Taylor
- Preceded by: Andrew Bragg
Shadow ministerial offices
Shadow Special Minister of State
In office 5 June 2022 – 3 May 2025
| Leader | Peter Dutton |
| Preceded by | Don Farrell |
| Succeeded by | James McGrath |
Shadow Minister for Finance Shadow Minister for the Public Service
In office 5 June 2022 – 3 May 2025
| Leader | Peter Dutton |
| Preceded by | Katy Gallagher |
| Succeeded by | James Paterson |
Ministerial offices
Minister for Superannuation, Financial Services and the Digital Economy
In office 22 December 2020 – 23 May 2022
| Prime Minister | Scott Morrison |
| Preceded by | Herself (as Assistant Minister for Superannuation, Financial Services and Financial Technology) |
| Succeeded by | Stephen Jones (as Minister for Financial Services) |
Assistant Minister for Superannuation, Financial Services and Financial Technology
In office 29 May 2019 – 22 December 2020
| Prime Minister | Scott Morrison |
| Preceded by | Office established |
| Succeeded by | Herself (as Minister for Superannuation, Financial Services and the Digital Economy) |
Minister for Women's Economic Security
In office 30 March 2021 – 23 May 2022
| Prime Minister | Scott Morrison |
| Preceded by | Office established |
| Succeeded by | Office abolished |

Senator for Victoria
- Incumbent
- Assumed office 2 July 2016

Personal details
- Born: Edwina Jane Exell; 30 April 1971 (age 55) Melbourne, Victoria, Australia
- Party: Liberal
- Education: University of Melbourne
- Occupation: Finance, banking

Edwina Jane Hume (née Exell; born 30 April 1971) is an Australian politician who has served as the deputy leader of the Opposition and deputy leader of the Liberal Party since 2026. She has a been a senator for Victoria since 2016, and previously held ministerial positions in the Morrison government. Prior to entering politics, she held senior positions in the banking, finance and superannuation sectors.

== Early life ==
Hume was born in Melbourne on 30 April 1971. She is one of two daughters born to Steve and Louise Exell; her father was a senior executive with Quaker Oats and later worked as a management consultant and business broker. She grew up in the suburb of Armadale and attended Lauriston Girls' School. She graduated from the University of Melbourne with the degree of Bachelor of Commerce.

== Career ==
Hume began working at the National Australia Bank (NAB) in 1995 as a sales and marketing research manager. She completed a graduate diploma in finance and investment with the Securities Institute of Australia in 1996, and subsequently worked with NAB as an investment manager (1996–1998) and private banker (1998–1999). She then moved to Rothschild Australia as a senior business development manager in the asset management division, and briefly as a key accounts manager. She left the workforce in 2002 to start a family, and from 2005 to 2006 served on the management committee of Perinatal Anxiety & Depression Australia (PANDA).

Hume was a vice-president of Deutsche Bank Australia from 2008 to 2009 and later served on the boards of the Royal Children's Hospital (2011–2016) and Fed Square Pty Ltd (2015–2016). Immediately before her election to parliament she was a senior strategic policy adviser with AustralianSuper.

== Politics ==
Hume joined the Liberal Party in 2003. Before her election to the Senate, Hume held senior positions in the Liberal Party of Australia (Victorian Division), serving on the administrative committee, on the executive of the Women's Council, and as a delegate to state council. She was president of the party's Armadale branch.

=== Senate (2016–present) ===
In March 2016, Hume won Liberal preselection for the Coalition's Senate ticket at the next federal election. She was initially ranked in third position behind James Paterson and Nationals senator Bridget McKenzie, after losing to Paterson in the ballot for the top position. However, following a double dissolution she was elected in fifth position on the Coalition ticket at the 2016 federal election. Her candidacy was supported by the party's state president Michael Kroger.

Prior to the 2019 election, Hume stated she was "seriously considering" switching to the lower-house seat of Higgins in place of the retiring Kelly O'Dwyer. She subsequently declined to contest the preselection ballot, citing a need for "fresh talent". Prime Minister Scott Morrison subsequently intervened to ensure incumbent senators Hume and Paterson were re-endorsed, following opposition from the party's conservative wing.

In May 2019, Hume was appointed Assistant Minister for Superannuation, Financial Services and Financial Technology in the Morrison government. In an interview with The Sydney Morning Herald after her appointment, she described Australia's superannuation system as "inefficient" due to "high fees, duplicate accounts, underperforming funds and unnecessary insurance". She promised "a much broader vision for super" and said the government would make superannuation insurance voluntary for people under the age of 25 to reduce fees.

Hume's title was changed to Minister for Superannuation, Financial Services and the Digital Economy as part of a December 2020 cabinet reshuffle. In March 2021, following the allegations of sexual misconduct in parliament, she was additionally appointed Minister for Women's Economic Security, a new position. She held both portfolios until May 2022, following the appointment of the Albanese ministry. Following Ley's resignation, under the Taylor shadow ministry, Hume was appointed as the Deputy Leader of the Opposition, Shadow Minister for Employment and Industrial Relations and the Shadow Minister for Productivity and Deregulation.

=== Political views ===
Hume reportedly "holds socially liberal views". According to The Sydney Morning Herald, Hume is a member of the Moderate/Modern Liberal faction of the Liberal Party. In her maiden speech she said that "my side of politics owes it to our followers and to our most vulnerable to articulate a positive social justice agenda for the Right". She has described herself as a "lifelong monarchist".

In May 2021, Hume stated her philosophy on regulating the cryptocurrency sector, arguing that it was up to Australian investors to "be sensible enough to judge for themselves whether to put their hard earned money into higher-risk assets". She argued that cryptocurrency was subject to Australian laws – “it's not a free pass” – but that she would not stand in the way of anyone who wanted to buy it. She also said that influencers and social media users offering investment advice should not be subject to the stricter guidelines imposed on registered financial advisers.

In September 2022, Hume spoke in favour of a bill to repeal the Euthanasia Laws Act 1997, which bars Australia's territory governments from legislating for assisted suicide. She had previously been in favour of the ban, but changed her mind following the death of her own terminally ill father via assisted suicide.

== Personal life ==
Hume has three children with her former husband Andrew Hume.

Hume supports St Kilda in the Australian Football League.

Parliament of Australia
| Preceded by Ted O'Brien | Deputy Leader of the Opposition; 2026–present | Incumbent |
Party political offices
| Preceded by Ted O'Brien | Deputy Leader of the Liberal Party; 2026–present | Incumbent |
