= Sarah Henderson =

Australian politician and journalist (born 1964)

Senator the Honourable Sarah Henderson
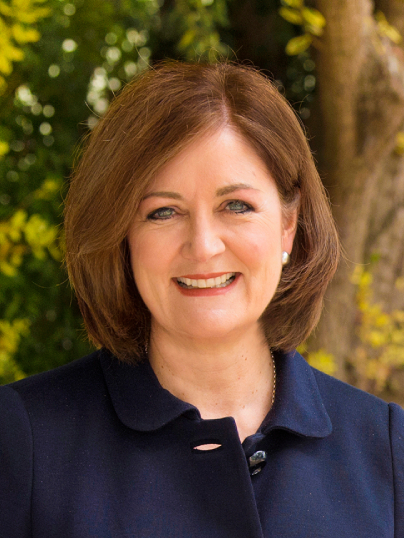
- Campaign portrait, 2019

Assistant Minister for Social Services and Disability Services
- In office 18 February 2016 – 24 August 2018
- Prime Minister: Malcolm Turnbull
- Preceded by: Jane Prentice
- Succeeded by: Stuart Robert

Senator for Victoria
- Incumbent
- Assumed office 11 September 2019
- Preceded by: Mitch Fifield

Member of the Australian Parliament for Corangamite
- In office 7 September 2013 – 18 May 2019
- Preceded by: Darren Cheeseman
- Succeeded by: Libby Coker

Personal details
- Born: 4 April 1964 (age 62) Geelong, Victoria, Australia
- Party: Liberal
- Domestic partner: Simon Ramsay (2009–2017)
- Relations: Ann Henderson (mother)
- Education: Monash University
- Profession: Journalist, lawyer and television presenter
- Website: sarahhenderson.com.au

Sarah Moya Henderson (born 4 April 1964) is an Australian politician, lawyer and former journalist. She has been a senator for Victoria since 2019, as a member of the Liberal Party. She was previously the member of parliament (MP) for the Victorian division of Corangamite from 2013 to 2019.

== Early life ==
Henderson was born on 4 April 1964 in Geelong, Victoria. Her mother Ann Henderson (née Corben) was a Liberal state government minister in the 1990s, while her father Michael Henderson served as mayor of the City of Newtown and was an unsuccessful Liberal candidate for state parliament.

Henderson began her education at Sacred Heart College in Geelong. She moved to The Geelong College in 1977, soon after it became co-educational, and became the first female school captain.

== Journalism ==
In 1982, Henderson became a cadet reporter with Channel 7 in Melbourne. She went on to work with Channel 9 in Brisbane and then Channel 10 in Melbourne, where she presented the weekend news with Alister Paterson. She moved to ABC-TV where she worked as a presenter of the consumer advocacy program The Investigators. Her media career included working as a presenter of the ABC's Holiday program (1992–1993) and Australia's Most Wanted in 1994, and she was the Victorian presenter of The 7.30 Report in 1995.

When The 7.30 Report became a national program in 1996, she continued working as the program's law correspondent and was also awarded a Walkley Award for her coverage of the Port Arthur massacre. In 1998, she obtained a Bachelor of Laws degree from Monash University and moved to a career in the law with the Melbourne firm Arthur Robinson & Hedderwicks. She worked as an attorney for News Corporation and was a weekly columnist with the Herald Sun newspaper from 2002 to 2004. At the same time, she established the Kudos Management Group which led to business management roles with Network Ten and National Indigenous Television.

== Politics ==
In 2009, Henderson was chosen as the Liberal Party candidate for the federal seat of Corangamite, but was defeated by ALP incumbent Darren Cheeseman in the 2010 election. She was preselected again as the Liberal Party's candidate for Corangamite at the 2013 federal election, and won the seat with a 4.6-point swing. Ahead of the 2019 election, a redistribution erased Henderson's majority and made Corangamite marginally Labor. Henderson sought another term in 2019, but was defeated by her 2016 opponent, Libby Coker.

On 26 May 2019, Victorian Senator Mitch Fifield chose to accept a position as the Permanent Australian Representative in the United Nations, leaving the possibility that the Liberal Party would choose Henderson to fill the casual vacancy caused by Fifield's eventual resignation to accept the role. On 8 September, Henderson defeated Greg Mirabella in the preselection ballot 234 votes to 197. She was appointed to the Senate by a joint sitting of the Parliament of Victoria on 11 September 2019.

After the Coalition's defeat at the 2022 federal election, Henderson was appointed to new opposition leader Peter Dutton's shadow cabinet. She held the communications portfolio until February 2023, when she replaced Alan Tudge in the education portfolio following his retirement from parliament.

== Political positions ==
=== Environment ===
As the Member for Corangamite, Henderson campaigned strongly against coal-seam gas mining (fracking) in Victoria's south-west as well as against a planned drilling campaign in the Great Australian Bight. However, following losing her seat at the 2019 Federal Election and being appointed to fill a casual senate vacancy, she urged Victorian Premier Daniel Andrews to lift the moratorium on conventional on-shore gas mining, saying to the Senate "Victoria is at a tipping point, facing blackouts over summer, with now the highest electricity prices in the nation. We need more dispatchable power – taking gas out of the Otway Basin onshore, as the state permits offshore, is desperately required."

By 2020, Henderson had taken a more rightward shift on the issue of climate change describing local MPs in the Geelong region as "climate action zealots" while also coming out in support of coal mining and gas.

=== Foreign ownership ===
Henderson has made calls for the strengthening of foreign investment rules, and opposes foreign ownership of vital assets, saying that "Australia's critical infrastructure assets, such as airports, power stations, data networks, communications infrastructure and ports – including the Port of Darwin – should simply not be falling into foreign hands."

=== Water management ===
Henderson supports a review into the allocation of water permits in the Murray–Darling Basin. "We must always ask what more we can do — whether it be a serious review of environmental water allocations for the Murray or new water trading rules to combat the corporate water hoarders and price takers."

Henderson also supports the construction of new dams, saying water "storage infrastructure is vital and in contrast to the NSW Government, the Victorian Government was refusing to green light any new dam".

=== Refugees and asylum seekers ===
Henderson opposes the transfer of asylum seekers to Australia on medical grounds. On the medevac legislation, she states that "there is no need for this bill ... this is all about politics. We are very very concerned ... it's unnecessary and it's all about politics and not about substance", while previously stating that those requiring medical treatment could already access assistance on Manus Island and Nauru.

Henderson has generally upheld the party line on boat turnbacks.

=== COVID-19 ===
Henderson supported public health measures, including restrictions, to mitigate the spread of COVID-19 in the community, but stated while Victorians understood the need for health restrictions, including those made using State of Emergency powers, restrictions must be proportionate to the public health risk, justifiable and temporary. She also said that she had "raised deep concerns about some restrictions which have closed businesses on what appears to be arbitrary and inconsistent grounds".

In September 2020, Henderson described Victoria's roadmap out of COVID-19 restrictions as a "journey of despair".

=== Social issues ===
According to the Sydney Morning Herald, Henderson is a member of the National Right faction of the Liberal Party, after previously being aligned with the Centre-Right faction during the Morrison government years.

She was a supporter of same-sex marriage in Australia. In a statement, released in June 2015, she stated that marriage equality "is consistent with fundamental Liberal values which embrace freedom of the individual and stable, long-term relationships". She also advocated for a free vote on the floor of parliament on the issue for Coalition MPs.

By 2017, under the Prime Ministership of Malcolm Turnbull leading up to a discussion on the marriage equality plebiscite within the Liberal Party room, Henderson shifted in favour of the plebiscite, stating that the plebiscite concept had "resonated very positively in the community".

Henderson is pro-choice on the issue of abortion, which has drawn ire from more conservative elements within the Victorian Liberal Party. Nonetheless, on the floor of Parliament, on the question on whether the federal government should ensure that all Australians have access to abortion services, Henderson has almost always voted along party lines.

Henderson is opposed to voluntary euthanasia. In October 2017, she tweeted an article written by former Prime Minister Paul Keating arguing against such legislation, adding that Victoria's euthanasia bill would "embed a culture of dying" in the state.

Henderson supported state Liberal MP Moira Deeming when the state Liberal Party Leader proposed expelling her for her part in organising a women’s rights rally which was attended by neo-Nazis.

=== Other positions ===
Upon taking her Senate seat, Henderson was eligible for a $100,000 payout for serving two terms as an MP. She handed back part of this payout saying her decision to keep only a "pro rata" amount was "in line with community expectations".

In early November 2022, Henderson wrote to ABC (her former employer) managing director David Anderson "requesting disclosure of the remuneration packages for employees, contractors, subcontractors, or other workers earning an annual salary of at least $230,000" among other information sought. The request was denied by Anderson on the grounds of "public interest immunity".

As Shadow Minister for Communications, Henderson raised suggestions of SBS influence during Senate estimates, questioning why the Australian panel of Eurovision 2026 judges awarded Israel zero points, and why the Australian public also awarded Israel zero points.

Parliament of Australia
Preceded by Darren Cheeseman	Member for Corangamite; 2013–2019	Succeeded by Libby Coker
Preceded by Mitch Fifield	Senator for Victoria; 2019–present	Incumbent
