= 2026 Liberal Party of Australia leadership spill =

Australian political party election

- 13 February 2026
- Leadership election

51 caucus members of the Liberal Party 26 votes needed to win
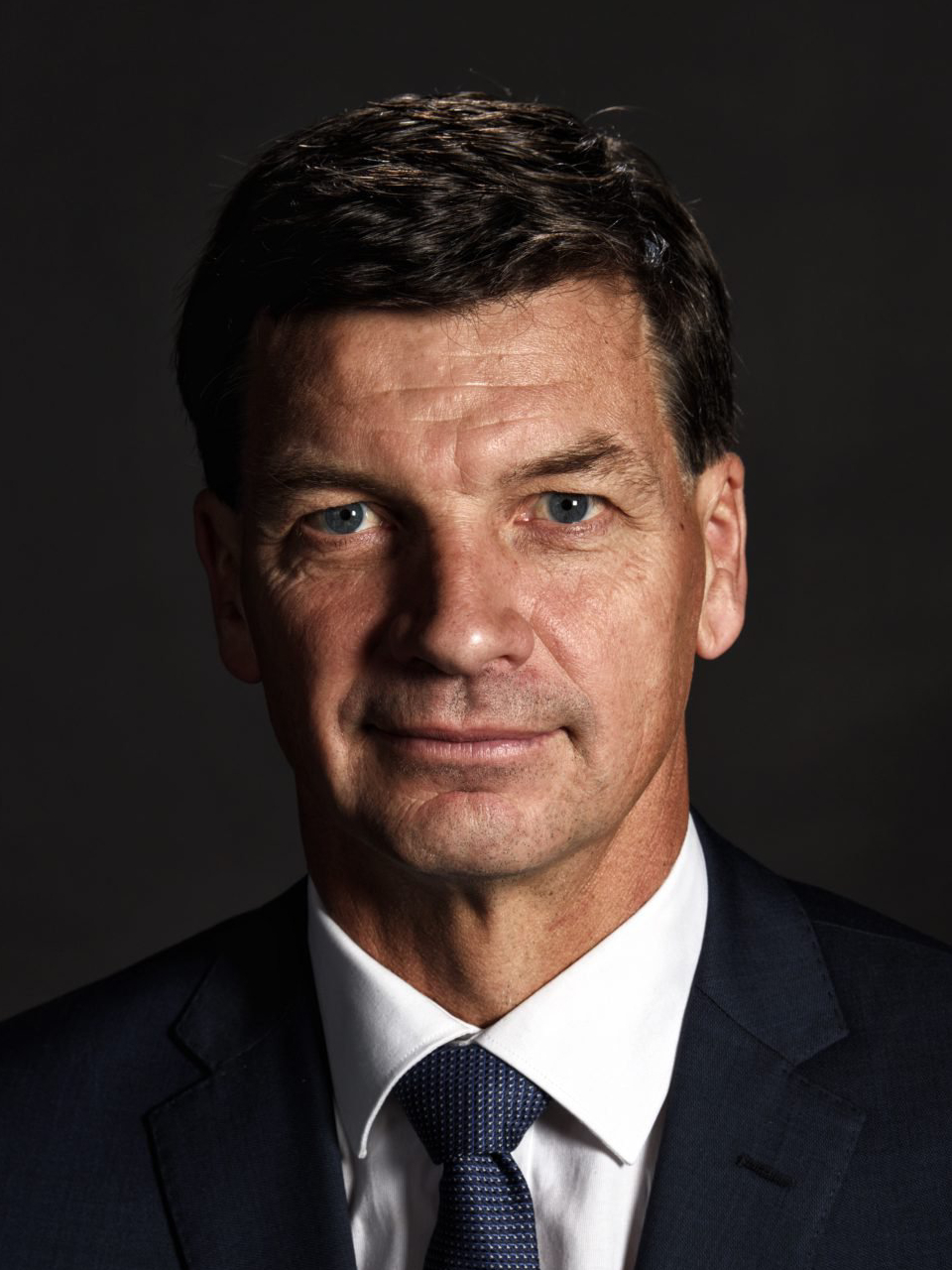

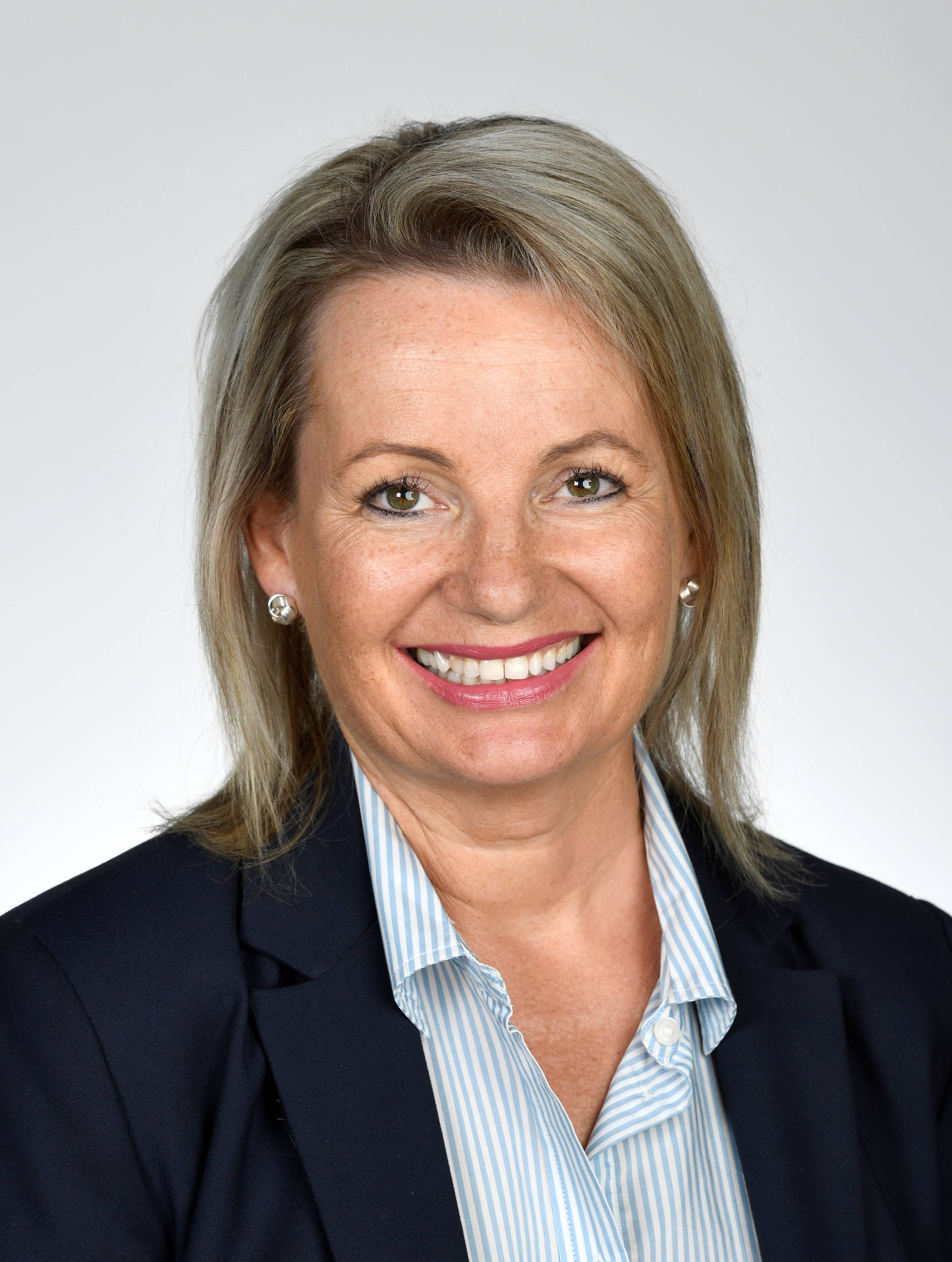
Candidate	Angus Taylor	Sussan Ley
Caucus vote	34	17
Percentage	66.7%	33.3%
Seat	Hume (NSW)	Farrer (NSW)
Faction	National Right	Moderate
Leader before election
Sussan Ley
Elected Leader
Angus Taylor
- Deputy leadership election
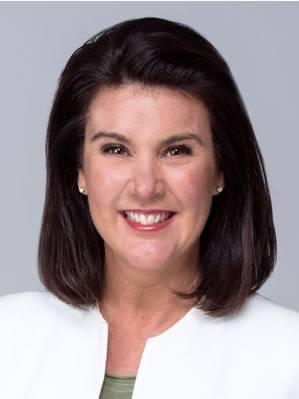

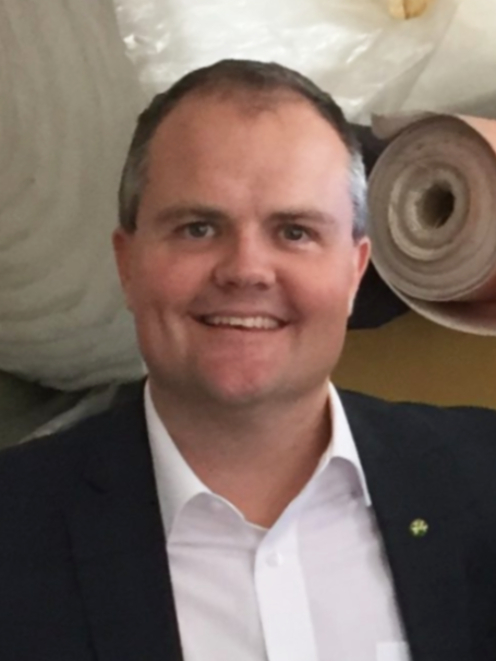

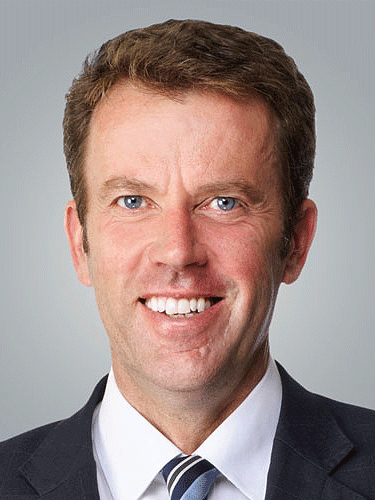

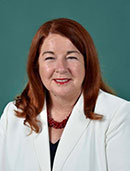
Candidate	Jane Hume	Ted O'Brien
First ballot	20	16
Second ballot	21	18
Final ballot	30	20
Seat	Victoria (Senate)	Fairfax (Qld)
Faction	Moderate	Moderate
Candidate	Dan Tehan	Melissa Price
First ballot	13	2
Second ballot	11	Eliminated
Final ballot	Eliminated	Eliminated
Seat	Wannon (Vic)	Durack (WA)
Faction	National Right	Moderate
Deputy Leader before election
Ted O'Brien
Elected Deputy Leader
Jane Hume

A leadership spill was held on 13 February 2026 to elect the leader of the Liberal Party of Australia, and by virtue, the leader of the Opposition. Angus Taylor was elected, defeating incumbent leader Sussan Ley. A spill for the deputy leadership was held concurrently, with Jane Hume being elected, defeating incumbent deputy leader Ted O'Brien.

Taylor, a leading member of the National Right party faction, resigned from Ley's shadow cabinet on 11 February, following his declaration that Ley was not "in a position to lead the party as it needs to be led". The spill motion was subsequently launched by Jess Collins and Phillip Thompson. (Note: For leadership spills to be held in the Liberal Party, two members of the caucus must move to spill the leadership.) Taylor announced his candidacy for the leadership on the morning of 12 February.

Following the spill, Ley resigned from Parliament, triggering a by-election in her former electorate of Farrer.

== Background ==
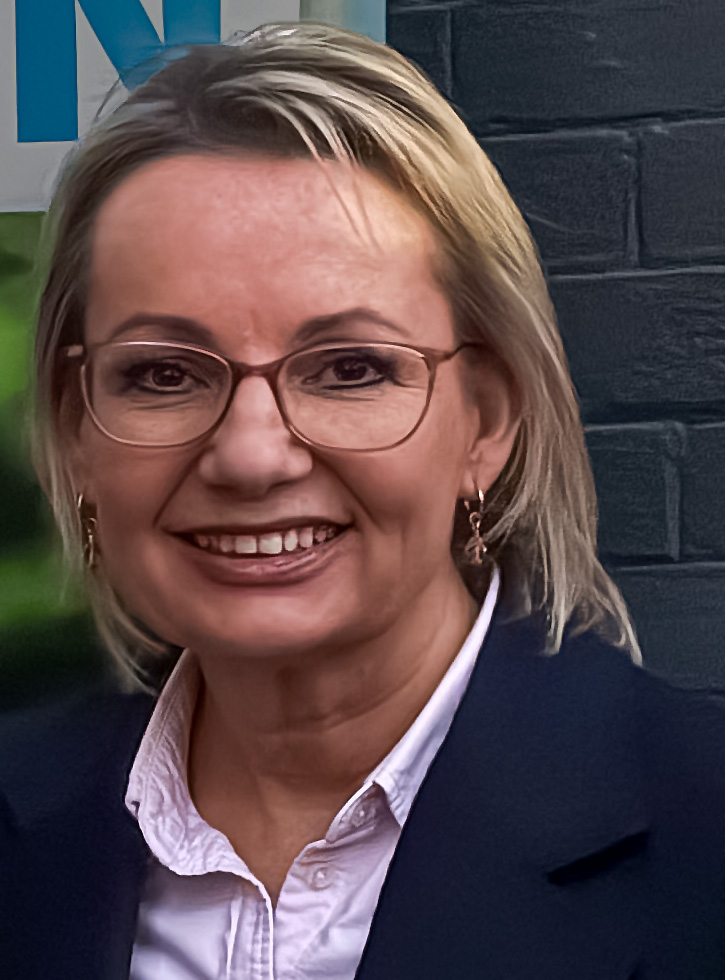
Ley in 2025

Since its historic landslide defeat at the 2025 federal election, the Liberal–National Coalition's primary vote fell further to 18%, below One Nation (at 28%). The Coalition's poor polling, along with two splits from the National Party, amplified tensions between the Moderates and National Right factions, particularly on policy regarding immigration and climate change. Incumbent Liberal leaders who have not led the party to victory at a federal election can be ousted with a simple majority of the party room, as opposed to a two-thirds supermajority to oust leaders who have led them to victory.

=== 2025 leadership election ===
Following previous Liberal leader Peter Dutton's defeat in his own seat at the 2025 election, Sussan Ley was appointed as the acting leader of the Liberal Party, until a leadership election could be held.

The election was contested by Ley and Angus Taylor, with Ley defeating Taylor, 29 votes to 25.

==== Early leadership tensions ====
Three outgoing Senators (Hollie Hughes, Linda Reynolds, David Fawcett) and the provisional winner of Bradfield, Gisele Kapterian, were allowed to vote in this leadership election. Hughes and Reynolds publicly endorsed Ley for leader and Kapterian identified as a moderate. Kapterian would end up narrowly losing Bradfield to Nicolette Boele on a later recount. David Fawcett was part of the conservative National Right faction and was identified as a Taylor supporter. Hughes' incoming replacement as Senator, Jessica Collins, was similarly identified as a member of the National Right and an ally of Taylor.

Taylor's decision to enter a cross endorsement agreement with Northern Territory Senator Jacinta Nampijinpa Price as his deputy on a joint leadership ticket reportedly cost him a few votes. Price's earlier decision to switch from the Nationals to the Liberals with little advance notice to party leaders had alienated many of her colleagues, including conservatives who might otherwise have supported her.

This meant that Ley's narrow win over Taylor would likely have been even narrower or Taylor would have defeated Ley, had the moderate outgoing Senators and Kapterian not been present, and if Taylor had not decided to associate with Price as closely as he did. Ley's internal mandate as party leader was therefore seen as weak from the very beginning of her tenure.

One day after Ley's ascension, Andrew Hastie publicly expressed his desire to lead the Liberal Party in the future, despite him congratulating Ley on her appointment and electing not to formally contest the leadership ballot himself.

===== Gender politics and the glass cliff =====
There was substantial media commentary on Ley's ascension in the aftermath of her party's historic landslide defeat on whether she was facing the glass cliff phenomenon.

Blair Williams, a lecturer in Politics and International Relations at Monash University, argued that Ley was being asked to rebuild the party after its worst electoral defeat in history and explicitly characterised her appointment as a glass cliff scenario.

Professor Michelle Ryan of the Australian National University also described Ley's appointment as a glass cliff, while some of Ley's female colleagues suggested that excessive focus on the glass cliff phenomenon was sexist in and of itself.

Ley herself explicitly rejected the glass cliff characterisation of her leadership.

=== Coalition splits ===
==== 2025 split ====
The first Coalition split occurred on 20 May 2025, shortly after its landslide defeat at the 2025 election. David Littleproud, the leader of the National Party had policy disagreements with Ley, particularly on nuclear power, the Regional Australia Future fund, and giving divestiture powers to supermarkets.

Littleproud argued that because the National Party largely maintained their seat count while the Liberal Party suffered heavy losses, this gave the junior partner a greater mandate to shape Coalition policy. Ley refused to commit to the demands without a formal review, leading the National Party to sit separately on the crossbench.

===== Criticism of the split's timing =====
The split happened only a week after Ley had been elected Liberal leader and only days after the death of her mother, with Ley's election as leader being one of the last significant events her mother witnessed.

Littleproud was criticised for the insensitive timing of the split, given that he had been the one to initiate it. Among those expressing reservations were some of his own Nationals colleagues, who were privately uneasy at his decision to force a political crisis on Ley so early in her tenure as leader and while she was still grieving for her mother, with the funeral having been scheduled for 30 May.

===== Reunion =====
The parties reunited on 27 May 2025 after a compromise deal was reached. The split had lasted 8 days.

==== 2026 split ====
The second split happened 8 months later in January 2026, after Nationals frontbenchers Bridget McKenzie, Susan McDonald, and Ross Cadell crossed the floor to vote against the Hate Speech laws following the 2025 Bondi Beach shooting, contrary to the Coalition's official position. Afterwards, the three Nationals offered their resignations to Ley as an acknowledgement of their breach of shadow cabinet solidarity, but they did not expect her to formally accept their resignations. In response, Ley did accept their resignations, which led to Littleproud and his party leaving the Coalition agreement "in solidarity with his frontbenchers".

===== McKenzie's disputed reasoning for split =====
McKenzie stated in a 7.30 interview that the disagreements primarily concerned guarantees over four policies that benefited the Nationals' constituents and not over cabinet solidarity. Ley's office contacted the program almost immediately to dispute McKenzie's account, while the program was still on air, allowing interviewer Sarah Ferguson to put the counterclaim as an addendum near the end of the interview.

===== Littleproud's direct criticisms of Ley's leadership =====
In the immediate aftermath of this split, Littleproud explicitly stated that the Nationals "cannot be part of a shadow ministry under Sussan Ley". This raised eyebrows within both parties. The Liberals regarded Littleproud's direct statement as having overreached into their own internal affairs, while the Nationals were uncomfortable with his handling of the matter and believed he had unnecessarily escalated the conflict.

Littleproud appeared to soften his stance in February. He denied he had made his original remarks from January and instead claimed he merely said he would not work with Ley as long as the three Nationals frontbenchers who crossed the floor were not reinstated.

===== Ley's threats to permanently appoint Liberals to shadow ministries vacated by Nationals =====
Ley threatened to permanently appoint Liberals to shadow ministries vacated by the Nationals if a prompt reunification did not occur.

If this arrangement went ahead, it would have placed a further barrier against reunification, since this would require Ley to dismiss or demote the appointed Liberal shadow ministers in order to hand their portfolios back to the Nationals. This would also further exacerbate tensions between the Liberals and Nationals, particularly between the Liberals appointed to Nationals' portfolios and the Nationals who used to hold them, as well as between Ley and the Liberal shadow ministers she would have to dismiss if reunification were to occur after the permanent Liberal appointments.

===== Reunion =====
The Coalition reformed on 8 February following a failed leadership spill motion in the National Party room on 2 February. The split ended after 18 days when both parties signed a new "solidarity agreement" to codify that the joint party room has priority over individual party room decisions.

==== Treatment of Ley and gender politics ====
Contemporary media analysis noted that although Ley's difficult political situation she found herself in was partially as a result of her own decisions, there was also an element of sexism as well.

Reporting noted that Littleproud's decision to impose a political crisis before Ley had time to settle into the job and grieve the death of her mother, as well as the openness of some of her male colleagues' statements about their own leadership ambitions immediately after her ascension, were partly motivated by disrespect for female leadership.

Comparisons were also made to the glass cliff phenomenon.

After the first split in 2025, an unnamed Nationals MP was quoted saying "They elect a woman and then we announce we are leaving, then we wonder why people think we are dinosaurs".

After the second split, Prime Minister Anthony Albanese stated that "Sussan Ley has been undermined, the first woman leader of the Liberal Party, undermined from day one and the alternative leaders are worse."

=== Hastie and Taylor leadership challenge speculation ===
On 3 October 2025, Andrew Hastie resigned from his position of Shadow Minister for Home Affairs. In a statement, Hastie cited a disagreement regarding the Coalition's immigration strategy and stated that leader Sussan Ley deserved to lead "unencumbered by interventions from Shadow Cabinet colleagues."

Following a period of leadership speculation in early 2026, Hastie and Shadow Minister for Defence Angus Taylor met privately in Melbourne on 28 January 2026. The meeting took place against the backdrop of the memorial service for former Liberal MP Katie Allen, which both attended the following day at St Paul's Cathedral. Two days later, on 30 January, Hastie issued a statement ruling himself out of a potential leadership contest, conceding that he did not have the necessary support to become leader.

In response to the mounting pressure, Sussan Ley adopted a strategy similar to that used by Malcolm Turnbull towards the end of his prime ministership during the 2018 Liberal Party leadership crisis. Ley declared that she would not voluntarily call a party room meeting for a spill unless presented with a formal petition signed by a majority of the federal parliamentary party. By demanding that challengers "write their names" on a physical document, Ley aimed to force internal critics to publicly declare their opposition.

On 11 February 2026, Angus Taylor resigned from the shadow frontbench. In a press conference outside Parliament House, Taylor announced his intention to challenge for the leadership, stating, "I don't believe Sussan Ley is in a position to be able to lead the party as it needs to be led." His resignation triggered the spill motion scheduled for 13 February.

=== Gender and factional optics ===
Contemporary reporting suggested that figures within the Liberal Party (including some conservatives) were conscious of the optics of ousting their first female leader after only nine months in the role, before she had an opportunity to contest a federal election as leader. Ley's supporters argued that doing so would further damage the party's already poor standing among women voters. Taylor's supporters reportedly hoped that appointing a female deputy leader would help mitigate the backlash.

==== Jane Hume's prior demotion and subsequent motivations against Ley ====
Following the Coalition's defeat at the 2025 federal election, Ley demoted Jane Hume, previously the shadow finance minister, to the backbench.

Hume had attracted criticism for her involvement in multiple controversies that were widely blamed for contributing to the scale of the Coalition's electoral defeat, particularly among women and Chinese-Australian voters. Hume had championed a Coalition policy proposal that would require federal public servants to work from the office five days a week and had made unsubstantiated suggestions that Chinese spies may have been volunteering for Labor MP Clare O'Neil.

Hume, who had described Ley as a friend, publicly acknowledged that the demotion had hurt her professionally and personally. Subsequently, the relationship between them became strained, with Hume making several public criticisms of Ley's leadership.

==== Collaboration between Hume and conservatives against Ley ====
In the lead-up to the February 2026 leadership spill, Hume canvassed her colleagues for the deputy leadership and supported Taylor's challenge to Ley. Although Hume belonged to the party's moderate faction and Taylor to its conservative wing, the two had previously served together in Peter Dutton's economic team. Hume's election as deputy leader was seen as providing factional balance and an opportunity to soften any political fallout from removing the party's first female leader.

== The leadership spill ==
The party room meeting for the leadership spill was held at approximately 9 am on 13 February 2026.

=== Leadership spill motion and ballot ===
An initial spill motion to formally declare the leadership position vacant succeeded, 33 votes to 17. In a subsequent motion to elect a replacement leader, Ley opted to recontest the leadership position, with Taylor as the only other candidate. Taylor defeated Ley, 34 votes to 17, becoming the 17th leader of the Liberal Party of Australia and 37th Leader of the Opposition.

=== Deputy leadership ballot ===
The deputy leadership position also saw a four way contest between Jane Hume, incumbent deputy Ted O'Brien, Dan Tehan and Melissa Price. This resulted in a three round ballot which eventually resulted in Hume defeating O'Brien in the final round 30 votes to 20.

== Aftermath ==
=== Sussan Ley's resignation from parliament ===
Immediately after her defeat, Sussan Ley announced she would resign from parliament and quit politics. She formally tendered her resignation two weeks later on 27 February 2026. Her resignation triggered a by-election for her seat of Farrer in rural western New South Wales.

=== Chinese-Australian reactions to elevation of Hume to deputy leader ===
Hume's elevation to deputy leader so soon after her demotion renewed criticism from sections of the Chinese-Australian community over her previous remarks. Wanning Sun, an academic at the University of Technology Sydney, argued that Hume had undermined her previous apology by attempting to shift responsibility onto Labor for publicising her comments. Jimmy Li, president of the Victorian chapter of the Chinese Community Council of Australia, similarly called on Hume to offer a genuine apology to the Chinese-Australian community.

=== 2026 Farrer by-election ===
A by-election was held on 9 May 2026 to replace Ley as representative for Farrer. The seat was won by One Nation's candidate David Farley. This was the first time One Nation won a seat in the federal House of Representatives. Both the Liberals and Nationals fielded candidates, finishing 3rd and 4th, respectively.

The results of this by-election was interpreted as demonstrating the risk One Nation poses to the Liberal and National parties.

As a result of this by-election, the seat total of the Liberal-National Coalition, now led by Angus Taylor, in the House of Representatives decreased from 42 to 41. This was yet another historic low from the previous record of 43 seats they won in the 2025 federal election and after Barnaby Joyce's defection to One Nation in December 2025 previously reduced them to 42.

== Timeline ==
- 13 May 2025: Sussan Ley is elected leader of the Liberal Party, defeating Angus Taylor 29 votes to 25. She becomes the first woman to lead the party following the Coalition's defeat at the 2025 federal election.
- 20 May 2025: Leader of the Nationals David Littleproud announces the National Party will not enter a formal Coalition agreement after negotiations with Ley break down over nuclear energy and regional funding "guarantees".
- 27 May 2025: The Coalition reforms after one week of separation, following a compromise deal on policy review processes and shadow cabinet structures.
- 3 October 2025: Andrew Hastie resigns from his role as Shadow Minister for Home Affairs, citing policy disagreements over immigration.
- 21 January 2026: Nationals senators Bridget McKenzie, Susan McDonald, and Ross Cadell cross the floor against Labor's hate speech laws. After Ley accepts their resignations, the entire Nationals frontbench quits in protest.
- 28–29 January 2026: Angus Taylor and Andrew Hastie meet privately in Melbourne to discuss avoiding a split conservative vote in a leadership challenge.
- 30 January 2026: Following the Melbourne meetings and a week of speculation, Hastie rules himself out of challenging Ley for the leadership and said he lacked the necessary support.
- 8 February 2026: Ley and Littleproud broker a peace deal in Canberra, involving a temporary frontbench suspension for the "rogue" senators and a new solidarity agreement.
- 11 February 2026: Angus Taylor formally quits the shadow frontbench, declaring the party is in its "worst position" since 1944 and confirming his challenge to Ley's leadership.
- 12 February 2026: The leadership spill is confirmed to be held on 13 February after Jessica Collins and Phillip Thompson after formally delivered a letter to Sussan Ley’s office requesting a special party room meeting to move a spill motion. Following the delivery, Thompson resigned from his position as Shadow Assistant Minister for Defence. Throughout the day, multiple members of the shadow frontbench stepped down to support the challenge, including Leah Blyth, Michaelia Cash, Claire Chandler, Jonathon Duniam, James McGrath, Matt O'Sullivan and James Paterson.
- 13 February 2026: The leadership spill is held, with Taylor emerging as the Leader of the Liberal party, with 34 votes against Ley's 17. This cultivated in Ley announcing her resignation from parliament "in the coming weeks". Deputy Ted O'Brien also was deposed after a 4-way contest, with the final result determining Senator Jane Hume becoming deputy with 30 votes, compared to O'Brien's 20.

== Candidates ==
=== Leader ===
==== Declared ====
Candidate	Electorate	Faction	Portfolio(s)
Sussan Ley	Farrer (NSW)	Moderate	Leader of the Opposition (2025–2026); Leader of the Liberal Party (2025–2026); Deputy Leader of the Liberal Party (2022–2025); Minister for the Environment (2019–2022); Minister for Health (2019–2022)
Angus Taylor	Hume (NSW)	National Right	Shadow Minister for Defence (2025–2026); Minister for Industry, Energy and Emissions Reduction (2018–2022); Shadow Treasurer (2022–2025)

==== Speculated ====
Candidate		Electorate	Faction	Portfolio(s)
Tim Wilson (17887430121) (cropped)	Tim Wilson	Goldstein (Vic)	Moderate	Shadow Minister for Industrial Relations and Employment (2025–2026); Shadow Minister for Small Business (2025–2026)

==== Declined ====
- Andrew Hastie – Canning (WA); Shadow Minister for Home Affairs (2025)
- Ted O'Brien – Fairfax (QLD); Deputy Leader of the Opposition and Shadow Treasurer (2025–2026)

=== Deputy leader ===
==== Declared ====
Candidate	Electorate	Faction	Portfolio(s)
Ted O'Brien	Fairfax (Qld)	Moderate	Deputy Leader of the Opposition (2025–2026); Deputy Leader of the Liberal Party (2025–2026); Shadow Treasurer (2025–2026); Shadow Minister for Climate Change and Energy (2022–2025)
Jane Hume	Victoria (Senate)	Moderate	Shadow Minister for Finance (2022–2025); Shadow Special Minister of State (2022–2025); Shadow Minister for the Public Service (2022–2025)
Dan Tehan	Wannon (Vic)	National Right	Shadow Minister for Energy and Emissions Reduction (2025–2026); Shadow Minister for Immigration and Citizenship (2022–2025)
Melissa Price	Durack (WA)	Moderate/Centre Right	Shadow Minister for Defence Industry (2025–2026); Shadow Minister for Defence Personnel (2025–2026)

==== Speculated ====
Candidate	Electorate	Faction	Portfolio(s)
Melissa McIntosh	Lindsay (NSW)	Centre Right	Shadow Minister for Communications (2025–2026); Shadow Minister for Women (2025–present)
Zoe McKenzie	Flinders (Vic)	Unaligned	Shadow Cabinet Secretary (2025–present); Shadow Assistant Minister for Education and Early Learning (2025–2026)

==== Declined ====
- Jacinta Nampijinpa Price – Senator for the Northern Territory
- Angie Bell – Moncrieff (QLD); Shadow Minister for the Environment and Youth
- Tim Wilson – Goldstein (VIC); Shadow Minister for Small Business and Industrial Relations and Employment

== Endorsements ==
Several Liberal politicians made public endorsements before the spill motion.

=== Leader ===
==== Sussan Ley ====
List of Sussan Ley endorsements

Federal Liberal members

- Andrew Bragg – Senator for New South Wales
- Julian Leeser – Shadow Minister for Education and Early Learning; Shadow Minister for the Arts; MP for Berowra
- Paul Scarr – Senator for Queensland
- Dave Sharma – Senator for New South Wales
- Andrew Wallace – Shadow Attorney-General and MP for Fisher

==== Angus Taylor ====
List of Angus Taylor endorsements

Former heads of government

- Tony Abbott – Prime Minister of Australia (2013–2015)

Federal Liberal members

- Alex Antic – Senator for South Australia
- Jessica Collins – Senator for New South Wales
- James Paterson – Senator for Victoria
- Sarah Henderson – Senator for Victoria
- Jacinta Nampijinpa Price – Senator for the Northern Territory
- Phillip Thompson – MP for Herbert
- Tony Pasin – MP for Barker
- Ben Small – MP for Forrest

=== Deputy Leader ===
==== Jane Hume ====
List of Jane Hume endorsements

Federal Liberal members

- Sarah Henderson – Senator for Victoria

== Results ==
=== Leader ===
Caucus vote
Ballot →	13 February 2026
Required majority →	26 out of 51
Angus Taylor	34 / 51
Sussan Ley	17 / 51

=== Deputy Leader ===
Caucus vote
Ballot →	13 February 2026		
Required majority →	26 out of 51	26 out of 51	26 out of 51
Jane Hume	20 / 51	21 / 51	30 / 51
Ted O'Brien	16 / 51	18 / 51	20 / 51
Dan Tehan	13 / 51	11 / 51	Eliminated
Melissa Price	2 / 51	Eliminated	Eliminated
Informal votes	0 / 51	1 / 51	1 / 51

== Polling ==
Date	Polling Firm	Sample size	Preferred Liberal leader										
Date	Polling Firm	Sample size	Ley	Hastie	McIntosh	T. O'Brien	Price	Spender (Note: Not a member of the party)	Taylor	Tehan	Wilson	Other	Don't know
8–14 Feb 2026	Resolve	1,717 (all)	19%	13%	—N/a	3%	—N/a	—N/a	10%	—N/a	4%	—N/a	52%
8–14 Feb 2026	Resolve	— (ONP)	10%	26%	—N/a	—N/a	—N/a	—N/a	15%	—N/a	—N/a	—N/a	—N/a
13 Feb 2026	Liberal party room vote		33.3%	—	—	—	—	—	66.7%	—	—	—	—
3–10 Feb 2026	YouGov	1,561 (all)	10%	15%	2%	2%	—N/a	—N/a	8%	—N/a	3%	—N/a	60%
3–10 Feb 2026	YouGov	300 (L/NP)	12%	25%	2%	3%	—N/a	—N/a	11%	—N/a	2%	—N/a	45%
19–24 Nov 2025	Essential	1,020 (all)	14%	8%	—N/a	—N/a	11%	2%	5%	—N/a	5%	10%	45%
19–24 Nov 2025	Essential	244 (L/NP)	21%	17%	—N/a	—N/a	12%	7%	9%	—N/a	3%	5%	26%
17–20 Nov 2025	Newspoll	1,245 (all)	21%	15%	—N/a	3%	—N/a	—N/a	9%	—N/a	6%	—N/a	46%
17–20 Nov 2025	Newspoll	300 (L/NP)	28%	20%	—N/a	2%	—N/a	—N/a	12%	—N/a	7%	—N/a	31%
22–27 Oct 2025	Essential	1,041 (all)	13%	10%	—N/a	—N/a	10%	4%	7%	—N/a	3%	16%	42%
22–27 Oct 2025	Essential	236 (L/NP)	22%	20%	—N/a	—N/a	13%	4%	9%	—N/a	4%	5%	24%
13 May 2025	Liberal party room vote		53.7%	—	—	—	—	—	46.3%	—	—	—	—
7–11 May 2025	Essential	1,137 (all)	16%	—N/a	—N/a	—N/a	—N/a	—N/a	12%	7%	—N/a	20%	45%
7–11 May 2025	Essential	341 (L/NP)	20%	—N/a	—N/a	—N/a	—N/a	—N/a	23%	6%	—N/a	12%	39%

== See also ==
- 2026 National Party of Australia leadership spill
