= 2026 National Party of Australia leadership elections =

2026 National Party of Australia leadership elections may refer to:

- March 2026 National Party of Australia leadership election, held in March following the resignation of David Littleproud
- February 2026 National Party of Australia leadership spill motion, held in February and resulting in the re-election of Littleproud
