= Kate Ellis (politician) =

Australian politician (born 1977)

The Honourable Kate Ellis
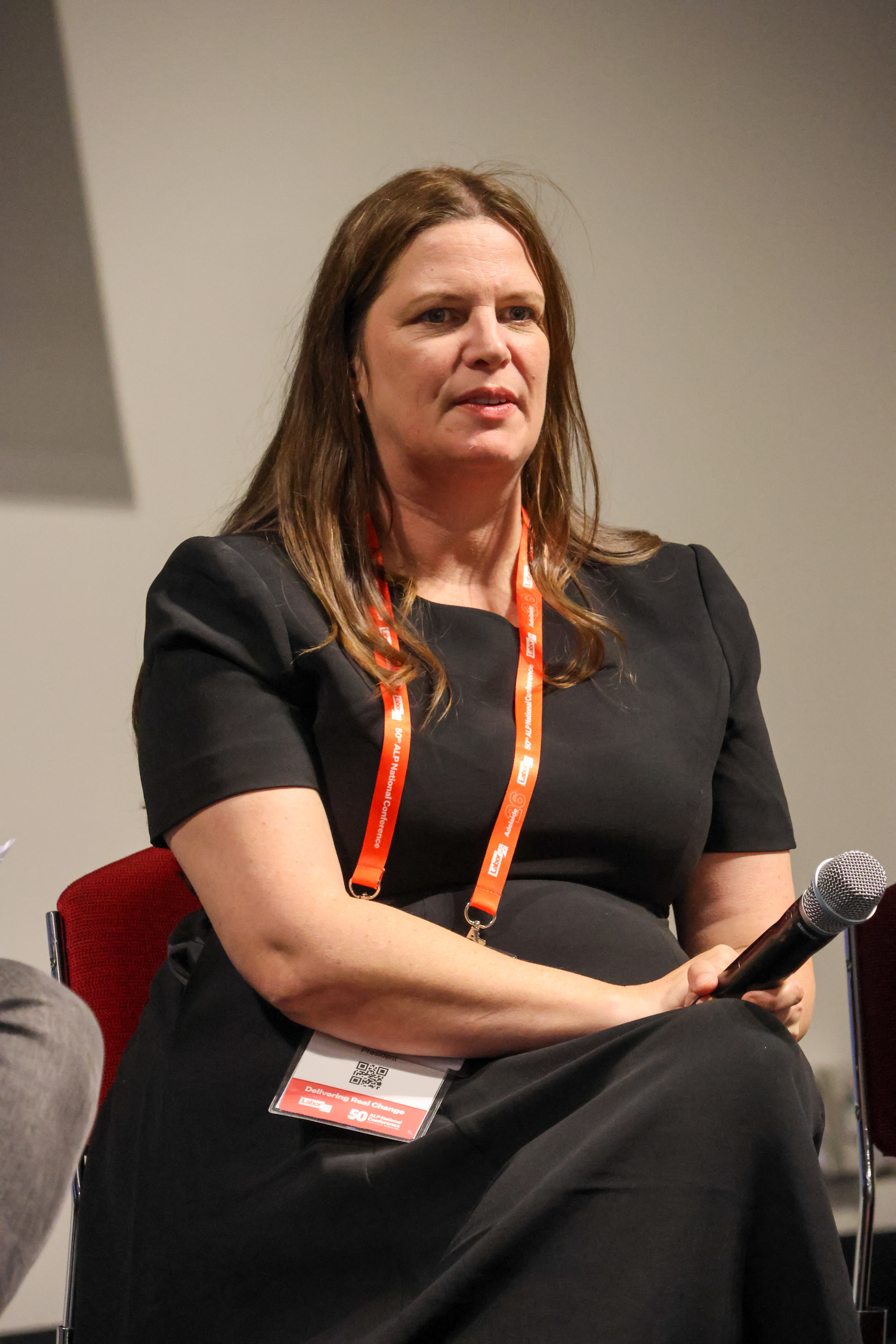
- Ellis in 2026

26th National President of the Labor Party
- Incumbent
- Assumed office 23 July 2026
- Leader: Anthony Albanese
- Preceded by: Wayne Swan

Minister for Early Childhood Education, Childcare and Youth
- In office 1 July 2013 – 18 September 2013
- Prime Minister: Kevin Rudd
- Preceded by: Peter Garrett
- Succeeded by: Sussan Ley
- In office 3 December 2007 – 28 June 2010
- Prime Minister: Kevin Rudd; Julia Gillard
- Preceded by: Position Recreated
- Succeeded by: Peter Garrett

Minister for Employment Participation
- In office 14 December 2011 – 18 September 2013
- Prime Minister: Julia Gillard; Kevin Rudd
- Preceded by: Mark Arbib
- Succeeded by: Luke Hartsuyker

Minister for the Status of Women
- In office 15 September 2010 – 14 December 2011
- Prime Minister: Julia Gillard
- Preceded by: Tanya Plibersek
- Succeeded by: Julie Collins

Minister for Sport
- In office 3 December 2007 – 24 June 2010
- Prime Minister: Kevin Rudd; Julia Gillard
- Preceded by: George Brandis
- Succeeded by: Mark Arbib

Member of the Australian Parliament for Adelaide
- In office 9 October 2004 – 11 April 2019
- Preceded by: Trish Worth
- Succeeded by: Steve Georganas

Personal details
- Born: Katherine Margaret Ellis; 22 September 1977 (age 49) Melbourne, Victoria, Australia
- Party: Australian Labor Party
- Spouse: David Penberthy (m. 2013)
- Children: 2

Katherine Margaret Ellis (born 22 September 1977) is an Australian politician and the 26th and current National President of the Australian Labor Party. She represented the Division of Adelaide in the Australian House of Representatives for the Australian Labor Party from 2004 until 2019. She served in multiple portfolios in the outer ministry of the Rudd–Gillard federal Labor government and was in the Shorten shadow cabinet. In March 2017 Ellis announced that she would step down from shadow cabinet as of the next reshuffle and leave parliament at the 2019 federal election.

== Early life and career ==
Ellis was born in Melbourne and grew up in rural South Australia in the Murray River town of Mannum where her mother worked as a teacher at the local primary school. Ellis moved to Adelaide for her secondary education, attending Daws Road High School. She enrolled but left without completing a Bachelor of International Studies at Flinders University. While enrolled at Flinders she was General Secretary of the Students Association and an editor of Empire Times. A member of the Australian Labor Party, she worked as a research officer for state and federal parliamentarians. Ellis is linked with the Shop, Distributive and Allied Employees Association (SDA). She was a ministerial adviser to South Australian state minister Rory McEwen and then for the former Deputy Premier of South Australia, Kevin Foley.

== Political career ==
Ellis was elected to the House of Representatives for the Division of Adelaide, South Australia at the 2004 federal election, defeating Liberal Party incumbent Trish Worth on a two percent two-party swing to a margin of 1.3 points, increasing to 8.5 points in 2007. The margin was reduced to 7.7 points in 2010 and to 4.0 percent in 2013.

After the 2007 election Ellis became Minister for Youth and Minister for Sport. This made her the youngest person to become an Australian government minister, a record until then held by former Prime Minister Paul Keating. In 2009 Ellis took on the portfolio of Early Childhood Education, Childcare and Youth. After the 2010 election, Ellis became the Minister for Employment Participation and Early Childhood and Childcare and the Minister for the Status of Women. For a few months prior to the 2013 Labor government defeat, Ellis was the Minister for Early Childhood, Childcare and Youth. Ellis was then elevated to shadow cabinet with the portfolios of Education and Early Childhood.

In 2012 Ellis voted in support of a same-sex marriage bill. She supported the Safe School Coalition Australia program in 2016.

In July 2026, at the national conference of the Labor Party, Ellis became national president of the party, succeeding former treasurer and deputy leader Wayne Swan.

== Personal life ==
On 23 February 2013, Ellis married News Limited journalist David Penberthy, then the editor-in-chief of news.com.au and a columnist for several News Limited publications and previously the editor of Sydney's Daily Telegraph. Ellis gave birth to her first child in April 2015 and a second in July 2017. Ellis supports the Adelaide Football Club and was named as a club ambassador in 2009. In 2011, she joined tennis star Lleyton Hewitt as the club's number-one ticket holder, becoming the first woman so honoured. She is also a Club Ambassador for the SANFL team the Glenelg Tigers.

Ellis's public image has been the subject of media attention since her entry into public life. In October 2008, she was voted Parliament's "sexiest" MP in a poll of federal MPs conducted by The Courier-Mail newspaper. In April 2010, she modelled a Karen Millen dress and Gucci high-heels for Grazia magazine. She agreed to do the shoot to raise awareness of the pressures on women related to body image, and to encourage fashion magazines to promote healthy attitudes toward weight and eating.

On 9 March 2017, Ellis announced that she would step down from shadow cabinet as of the next reshuffle, and leave parliament at the 2019 federal election in order to spend more time with her young family. A week later, it was announced that she was in the early stages of her second pregnancy, and her second son was born in July 2017.

In April 2021, her book, Sex, Lies and Question Time, was published by Hardie Grant.

== See also ==
- First Rudd Ministry
- First Gillard Ministry
- Second Gillard Ministry
- Second Rudd Ministry

Parliament of Australia
Preceded by Trish Worth	Member for Adelaide; 2004–2019	Succeeded by Steve Georganas
Political offices
Preceded by George Brandis	Minister for Sport; 2007–2010	Succeeded by Mark Arbib
Vacant	Minister for Youth; 2007–2010	Succeeded by Peter Garrett
Vacant	Minister for Early Childhood Education; 2009–2010	Succeeded by Peter Garrett
Vacant	Minister for Childcare; 2009–2013	Succeeded by Sussan Ley
Preceded by Tanya Plibersek	Minister for the Status of Women; 2010–2011	Succeeded by Julie Collins
Preceded by Mark Arbib	Minister for Employment Participation; 2010–2013	Succeeded by Peter Garrett
Preceded by Peter Garrett	Minister for Early Childhood; 2011–2013	Vacant Title next held by Anne Aly
Preceded by Peter Garrett	Minister for Youth; 2013	Vacant Title next held by Richard Colbeck
