= Ley shadow ministry =

Shadow ministry of opposition leader Sussan Ley

- Shadow cabinet of Australia

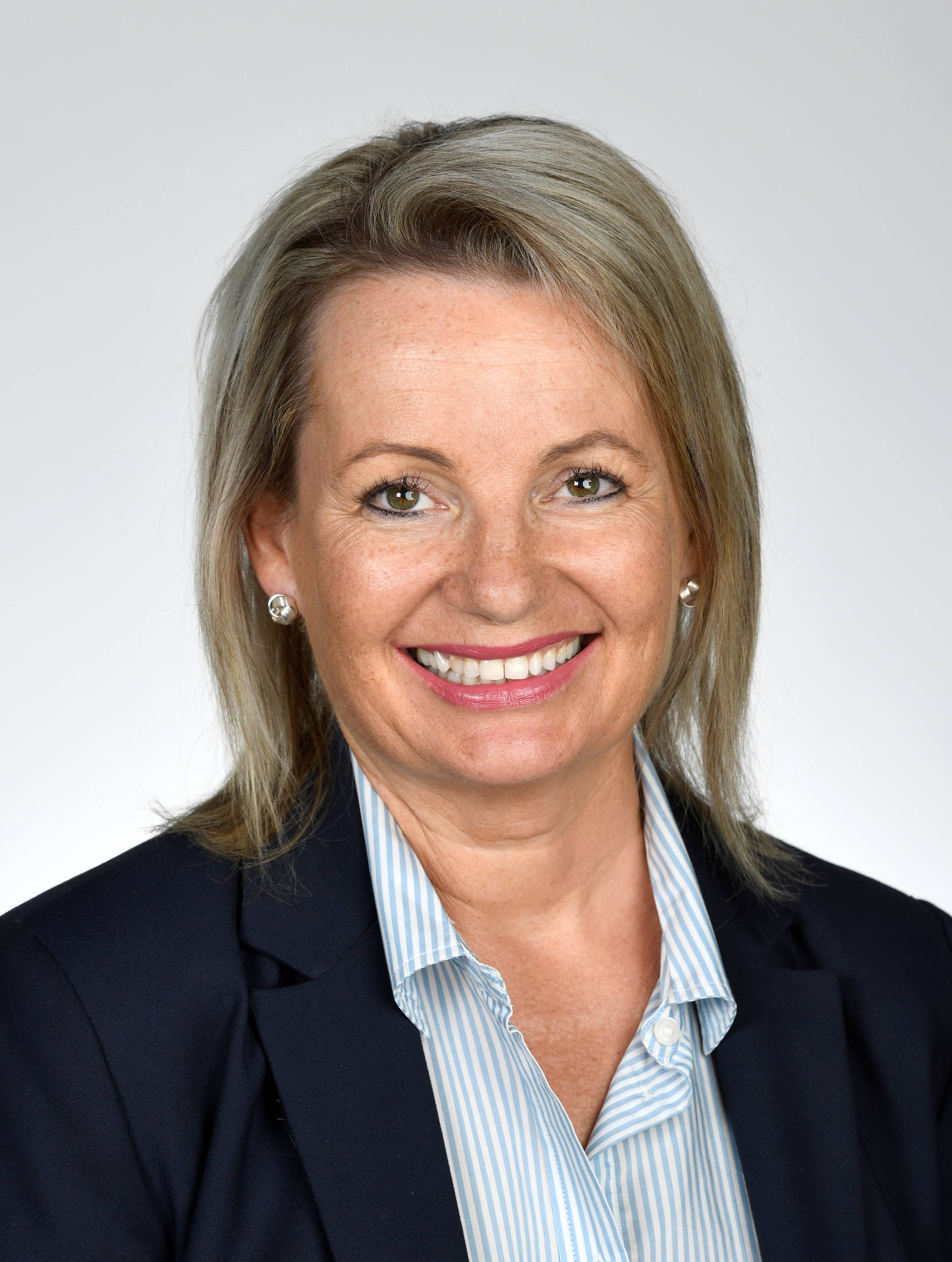
- Sussan Ley
- Date formed: 28 May 2025
- Date dissolved: 13 February 2026

People and organisations
- Opposition Leader: Sussan Ley
- Deputy Opposition Leader: Ted O'Brien
- Total no. of members: 32
- Member parties: Liberal; National (28 May 2025–21 Jan 2026; 8 Feb 2026–13 Feb 2026)
- Status in legislature: Opposition

History
- Election: 2025
- Legislature term: 48th
- Predecessor: Dutton shadow ministry
- Successor: Taylor shadow ministry

The shadow ministry of Sussan Ley was the shadow ministry from 2025 to 2026, in opposition to the Albanese government. The shadow ministry was the Opposition's alternative to the Albanese ministry, which was sworn in on 13 May 2025. The shadow ministry was first appointed by Sussan Ley following her election as leader of the Liberal Party and leader of the opposition on 13 May 2025, and came to an end in the 2026 Liberal Party leadership spill on 13 February 2026.

During Ley's tenure as Opposition Leader, the longstanding Coalition arrangement between the Liberal and National parties briefly split twice, with implications for the shadow ministry. National Party leader David Littleproud, who survived a leadership challenge on 12 May 2025, first announced that the Nationals would leave the Coalition on 20 May 2025, but the two parties reformed the Coalition eight days later, before any shadow cabinet reshuffle.

On 22 January 2026, Littleproud again announced that the Nationals would leave the Coalition, leaving Ley to announce a new "acting arrangement" for a Liberal-only shadow cabinet on 30 January. While the parties again reformed the Coalition on 8 February, one of the conditions of this reunion was that the National Party's former frontbenchers would remain suspended from the Coalition shadow cabinet until March 2026, with the partial exception of Littleproud and Nationals deputy leader Kevin Hogan, who resumed attendance at shadow cabinet meetings but did not formally regain their shadow portfolios.

On 11 and 12 February 2026, a total of eleven Liberal Party frontbenchers resigned from the Ley shadow ministry, with Shadow Defence Minister Angus Taylor being the first to resign. The shadow ministry ended on 13 February 2026, when Taylor successfully challenged Ley for leadership of the Liberal Party.

== Second arrangement (Acting January 2026-February 2026) ==
On 20 January 2026, National Party shadow ministers and senators Bridget McKenzie, Ross Cadell and Susan McDonald crossed the floor and voted against the government's proposed hate speech laws. The Coalition shadow cabinet had decided earlier that week to support the proposed legislation, but the National Party room only decided to oppose it just 20 minutes prior to the Senate vote. As shadow ministers were bound to follow shadow cabinet's decision by convention, the actions of the three shadow ministers "did not maintain shadow cabinet solidarity".

As a result, the following day (21 January 2026), the three offered their resignations from the shadow ministry, which were accepted by Ley. Following the resignations of the three senators, the eight remaining National Party colleagues in the shadow ministry, including Littleproud himself, also announced their resignations that evening "in solidarity" with the three senators. Ley then rejected the additional resignations and had urged Littleproud to reconsider. It was also reported that a split in the Coalition may be possible, even though at that time Littleproud had not indicated that the Nationals were leaving the Coalition.

On 22 January 2026, Littleproud confirmed that the Nationals would be leaving the coalition for the second time in a year. The split in the Coalition and resignation of National Party members would have resulted in a reshuffle of the shadow ministry.

On 30 January 2026, Ley announced a new 'acting arrangement' of the shadow cabinet, which would be temporary until 9 February 2026, where it would then be finalised in another shadow cabinet meeting if the Liberal-National Coalition has not reconciled. If the Coalition did not reconcile, then around 6 other Liberal MPs would be added to the then-formalised shadow ministry, who would have the shadow portfolios that the National's would've otherwise had held.

On 8 February 2026, Ley and Littleproud announced that both of them had reached a compromise and agreed to reunite the Coalition. As part of the renewed Coalition agreement, both parties had also agreed that shadow cabinet decisions could not be overturned by neither individual party, but instead could only be overturned by a joint Coalition party room. The acting arrangement would also continue until 1 March 2026, when all eleven former National frontbenchers (who had resigned in January 2026) would rejoin the shadow ministry and have their shadow portfolios reinstated. However, until then, the National Party leader and deputy leader (Littleproud and Kevin Hogan) would also attend shadow cabinet meetings (without their portfolios), "to ensure joint representation and accountability in decision-making during this interim period". Their portfolios would be reinstated with the other National frontbenchers on 1 March. In the parliamentary week after the announcement, there was debate in the parliament whether Littleproud and Hogan were considered to be in the shadow cabinet. It was ruled by the Speaker of the House Milton Dick, under the advice by Ley, that by the nature of their positions, both members were members of the shadow executive.

Before the acting arrangement could end on 1 March, on 11 February 2026, Angus Taylor announced he would not support Ley as leader and resigned from the shadow cabinet accordingly. On 12 February, ten others resigned from the frontbench. They were, in the chronological order of resignations, Claire Chandler, Matt O'Sullivan, Phillip Thompson, Jonathon Duniam, James Paterson, Leah Blyth, James McGrath, Michaelia Cash, Dan Tehan and Dean Smith. Ley was replaced by Taylor in a subsequent spill on 13 February.

=== Shadow cabinet (Acting from 30 January 2026 to 11 February 2026) ===
Party	Shadow Minister	Portrait	Offices	Ref
Liberal	Hon Sussan Ley (born 1961) MP for Farrer (NSW) (2001–2026)		Leader of the Opposition; Leader of the Liberal Party	
Liberal (LNP)	Ted O'Brien (born 1974) MP for Fairfax (Qld.) (2016–)		Deputy Leader of the Opposition; Shadow Treasurer; Acting Shadow Assistant Treasurer; Deputy Leader of the Liberal Party	
National (LNP)	Hon David Littleproud (born 1976) MP for Maranoa (Qld.) (2016–)		Rejoined shadow cabinet on 8 February 2026: Leader of the National Party	
National	Hon Kevin Hogan (born 1963) MP for Page (NSW) (2013–)		Rejoined shadow cabinet on 8 February 2026: Deputy Leader of the National Party	
Liberal	Hon Michaelia Cash (born 1970) Senator for Western Australia (2008–)		Shadow Minister for Foreign Affairs; Leader of the Opposition in the Senate; Acting Shadow Minister for Trade	
Liberal	Hon Anne Ruston (born 1963) Senator for South Australia (2012–)		Shadow Minister for Health and Aged Care; Shadow Minister for Disability and the National Disability Insurance Scheme; Shadow Minister for Sport; Acting Shadow Minister for Agriculture, Fisheries and Forestry; Deputy Leader of the Opposition in the Senate	
Liberal	Hon Angus Taylor (born 1966) MP for Hume (NSW) (2013–)		Shadow Minister for Defence; Acting Shadow Minister for Veterans' Affairs	
Liberal	James Paterson (born 1987) Senator for Victoria (2016–)		Shadow Minister for Finance; Shadow Minister for the Public Service; Shadow Minister for Government Services	
Liberal	Hon Jonathon Duniam (born 1982) Senator for Tasmania (2016–)		Shadow Minister for Home Affairs; Manager of Opposition Business in the Senate	
Liberal	Hon Dan Tehan (born 1968) MP for Wannon (Vic.) (2010–)		Shadow Minister for Energy and Emissions Reduction; Acting Shadow Minister for Resources	
Liberal	Julian Leeser (born 1976) MP for Berowra (NSW) (2016–)		Shadow Minister for Education and Early Learning; Shadow Minister for the Arts	
Liberal	Hon Tim Wilson (born 1980) MP for Goldstein (Vic.) (2016–2022, 2025–)		Shadow Minister for Industrial Relations and Employment; Shadow Minister for Small Business	
Liberal	Kerrynne Liddle (born 1967) Senator for South Australia (2022–)		Shadow Minister for Social Services; Shadow Minister for Indigenous Australians	
Liberal (LNP)	Hon Andrew Wallace (born 1968) MP for Fisher (Qld.) (2016–)		Shadow Attorney-General	
Liberal	Melissa McIntosh (born 1977) MP for Lindsay (NSW) (2019–)		Shadow Minister for Communications; Shadow Minister for Women	
Liberal	Andrew Bragg (born 1984) Senator for New South Wales (2019–)		Shadow Minister for Housing and Homelessness; Shadow Minister for Productivity and Deregulation	
Liberal (LNP)	Angie Bell (born 1968) MP for Moncrieff (Qld.) (2019–)		Shadow Minister for the Environment; Shadow Minister for Youth; Acting Shadow Minister for Water	
Liberal	Hon Alex Hawke (born 1977) MP for Mitchell (NSW) (2007–)		Shadow Minister for Industry and Innovation; Manager of Opposition Business in the House	
Liberal (LNP)	Hon James McGrath (born 1974) Senator for Queensland (2014–)		Shadow Minister for Urban Infrastructure and Cities; Shadow Minister for Brisbane 2032 Olympic and Paralympic Games; Shadow Special Minister of State; Acting Shadow Minister for Infrastructure	

=== Shadow outer ministry and shadow assistant ministry (Acting from 30 January 2026 to 11 February 2026) ===
There were no changes to portfolios held by Liberal Party frontbenchers in the shadow outer ministry and shadow assistant ministry during the acting period.

== First arrangement (May 2025–January 2026) ==
The first arrangement of the shadow ministry was announced by Ley and Littleproud on 28 May 2025. Due to the changes in the Liberal Party leadership and a few Coalition frontbenchers losing their seats at the 2025 federal election, portfolios were significantly reshuffled from the previous Dutton shadow ministry.

The Liberal Party dropped Sarah Henderson, Jane Hume, Claire Chandler and Tony Pasin from the frontbench, while the National Party dropped Michael McCormack and Barnaby Joyce from the frontbench. All six were shadow ministers in the previous shadow ministry. Rick Wilson (Liberal), who was an assistant shadow minister in the previous shadow ministry, was also not re-appointed to the shadow ministry. Nationals MP Michelle Landry, who was a shadow assistant minister in the previous shadow ministry, had been recently appointed as her party's Chief Whip and was therefore also not re-appointed to the shadow ministry. Nationals senator Matt Canavan, who was last on the Coalition frontbench in 2020 (as a government minister) and had challenged Littleproud for leadership after the election, was not appointed to the frontbench.

James McGrath (Liberal), Andrew Bragg (Liberal), Kerrynne Liddle (Liberal), Angie Bell (Liberal) and Darren Chester (National), all of who were in the previous shadow ministry but not in the shadow cabinet, had been elevated to the latter. Liberal MP Julian Leeser, who was an shadow assistant minister prior to the election, also returned to the shadow cabinet since his resignation in April 2023. Tim Wilson (Liberal) and Ross Cadell (National), who were not in the previous shadow ministry, were also elevated directly into the shadow cabinet. Jacinta Nampijinpa Price, who was a shadow cabinet minister in the previous ministry and had defected from the National Party to Liberal Party after the election, was not re-appointed to the shadow cabinet. Instead, she was appointed as a shadow minister in the shadow outer ministry.

Two former cabinet ministers (before 2022) who were not in the previous shadow ministry, Alex Hawke and Melissa Price (both Liberal), were also re-appointed to the front bench, with Hawke being a shadow cabinet minister and Melissa Price being a shadow minister in the shadow outer ministry.

Some members of parliament were also newly appointed to positions in the shadow assistant ministry. Two of them, Maria Kovacic and Leah Blyth, entered parliament between the 2022 and 2025 elections, with Blyth being a Senator for only less than four months prior to her appointment as a shadow assistant minister. Jamie Chaffey, who entered parliament in the 2025 election, was also appointed to the shadow assistant ministry. Gisele Kapterian was provisionally appointed as a shadow assistant minister pending the outcome of the vote recount (and subsequently Court of Disputed Returns) in Division of Bradfield, where she was contesting. The provisional appointment of Kapterian to the shadow assistant ministry was still upheld by Ley during a reshuffle in September 2025. Kapterian would later abandon the recount challenge later that month.

On 10 September 2025, Jacinta Nampijinpa Price was forced to resign from the ministry at the request of Ley, over the former's refusal to express confidence of the latter as party leader. On 14 September 2025, Ley announced a reshuffle of the shadow ministry as a result of Price's resignation, with Melissa Price taking over Jacinta Nampijinpa Price's portfolios. Simon Kennedy and Claire Chandler were also elevated to the frontbench, with Chandler returning to the frontbench since being dropped after the election. Chandler took over Melissa Price's portfolios, while Kennedy was allocated a new shadow assistant ministerial role for artificial intelligence, digital economy and scrutiny of government waste.

On 3 October 2025, Andrew Hastie resigned from the ministry, due to his disagreements with Sussan Ley on immigration policy, and his inability to comply with Ley's 'charter letters'. On 13 October 2025, Ley announced the third shadow ministry reshuffle in five months. Jonathon Duniam replaced Hastie as the shadow home affairs minister. Julian Leeser replaced Duniam as shadow education and early education minister, while retaining the arts portfolio. Andrew Wallace was elevated from the shadow assistant ministry to the shadow cabinet and replaced Leeser as shadow attorney-general. Zoe McKenzie replaced Wallace as shadow cabinet secretary while retaining her existing assistant shadow ministry portfolios. Aaron Violi and Cameron Caldwell were elevated to the frontbench and were appointed shadow assistant minister for communications and shadow assistant minister for housing and mental health respectively.

The arrangement lasted until 21 January 2026 with the mass resignation of National Party members from the frontbench.

=== Shadow cabinet ===
Party	Shadow Minister	Portrait	Offices	Ref
Liberal	Hon Sussan Ley (born 1961) MP for Farrer (NSW) (2001–2026)		Leader of the Opposition; Leader of the Liberal Party	
Liberal (LNP)	Ted O'Brien (born 1974) MP for Fairfax (Qld.) (2016–)		Deputy Leader of the Opposition; Shadow Treasurer; Deputy Leader of the Liberal Party	
National (LNP)	Hon David Littleproud (born 1976) MP for Maranoa (Qld.) (2016–)		Shadow Minister for Agriculture; Leader of the National Party	
	Hon Michaelia Cash (born 1970) Senator for Western Australia (2008–)		Shadow Minister for Foreign Affairs; Leader of the Opposition in the Senate	
	Hon Anne Ruston (born 1963) Senator for South Australia (2012–)		Shadow Minister for Health and Aged Care; Shadow Minister for Disability and the National Disability Insurance Scheme; Shadow Minister for Sport; Deputy Leader of the Opposition in the Senate	
	Hon Angus Taylor (born 1966) MP for Hume (NSW) (2013–)		Shadow Minister for Defence	
	James Paterson (born 1987) Senator for Victoria (2016–)		Shadow Minister for Finance; Shadow Minister for the Public Service; Shadow Minister for Government Services	
	Hon Jonathon Duniam (born 1982) Senator for Tasmania (2016–)		Shadow Minister for Home Affairs (since 13 October 2025); Shadow Minister for Education and Early Learning (until 13 October 2025); Manager of Opposition Business in the Senate	
	Hon Dan Tehan (born 1968) MP for Wannon (Vic.) (2010–)		Shadow Minister for Energy and Emissions Reduction	
	Julian Leeser (born 1976) MP for Berowra (NSW) (2016–)		Shadow Minister for Education and Early Learning (since 13 October 2025); Shadow Minister for the Arts; Shadow Attorney-General (until 13 October 2025)	
	Hon Tim Wilson (born 1980) MP for Goldstein (Vic.) (2016–2022, 2025–)		Shadow Minister for Industrial Relations and Employment; Shadow Minister for Small Business	
	Kerrynne Liddle (born 1967) Senator for South Australia (2022–)		Shadow Minister for Social Services; Shadow Minister for Indigenous Australians	
National	Hon Bridget McKenzie (born 1969) Senator for Victoria (2011–)		Shadow Minister for Infrastructure, Transport and Regional Development; Leader of the National Party in the Senate	
Liberal (LNP)	Hon Andrew Wallace (born 1968) MP for Fisher (Qld.) (2016–)		Shadow Attorney-General (since 13 October 2025); Shadow Cabinet Secretary (until 13 October 2025)	
Liberal	Melissa McIntosh (born 1977) MP for Lindsay (NSW) (2019–)		Shadow Minister for Communications; Shadow Minister for Women	
Liberal	Andrew Bragg (born 1984) Senator for New South Wales (2019–)		Shadow Minister for Housing and Homelessness; Shadow Minister for Productivity and Deregulation	
Liberal (LNP)	Angie Bell (born 1968) MP for Moncrieff (Qld.) (2019–)		Shadow Minister for the Environment; Shadow Minister for Youth	
National	Hon Kevin Hogan (born 1963) MP for Page (NSW) (2013–)		Shadow Minister for Trade, Investment and Tourism; Deputy Leader of the National Party; Deputy Manager of Opposition Business in the House	
National	Hon Darren Chester (born 1967) MP for Gippsland (Vic.) (2008–)		Shadow Minister for Veterans' Affairs	
Liberal	Hon Alex Hawke (born 1977) MP for Mitchell (NSW) (2007–)		Shadow Minister for Industry and Innovation; Manager of Opposition Business in the House	
National	Ross Cadell (born 1969) Senator for New South Wales (2022–)		Shadow Minister for Emergency Management; Shadow Minister for Water; Shadow Minister for Fisheries and Forestry	
Liberal (LNP)	Hon James McGrath (born 1974) Senator for Queensland (2014–)		Shadow Minister for Urban Infrastructure and Cities; Shadow Minister for Brisbane 2032 Olympic and Paralympic Games; Shadow Special Minister of State	
National (LNP)	Susan McDonald (born 1970) Senator for Queensland (2019–)		Shadow Minister for Resources and Northern Australia	
Former Shadow Ministers
Liberal	Hon Andrew Hastie (born 1982) MP for Canning (WA) (2015–)		Shadow Minister for Home Affairs (until 3 October 2025)	

=== Shadow outer ministry ===
Party	Shadow Minister	Portrait	Offices	Ref
National	Pat Conaghan (born 1971) MP for Cowper (NSW) (2019–)		Shadow Assistant Treasurer; Shadow Minister for Financial Services	
Liberal	Hon Jason Wood (born 1968) MP for La Trobe (Vic.) (2004–2010, 2013–)		Shadow Minister for International Development and Pacific Island Affairs	
Liberal	Hon Melissa Price (born 1963) MP for Durack (WA) (2013–)		Shadow Minister for Defence Industry (since 14 September 2025); Shadow Minister for Defence Personnel (since 14 September 2025); Shadow Minister for Science (until 14 September 2025); Shadow Minister for Cyber Security (until 14 September 2025)	
Liberal (LNP)	Paul Scarr (born 1969) Senator for Queensland (2019–)		Shadow Minister for Immigration; Shadow Minister of Citizenship and Multicultural Affairs; Deputy Manager of Opposition Business in the Senate	
Liberal (LNP)	Hon Scott Buchholz (born 1968) MP for Wright (Qld.) (2010–)		Shadow Minister for Skills and Training	
National	Dr. Anne Webster (born 1959) MP for Mallee (NSW) (2019–)		Shadow Minister for Regional Development, Local Government and Territories; Shadow Minister for Regional Communications	
Liberal	Hon Claire Chandler (born 1990) Senator for Tasmania (2019–)		Shadow Minister for Science (since 14 September 2025); Shadow Minister for Cyber Security (since 14 September 2025)	
Former Shadow Ministers
Liberal (CLP)	Jacinta Nampijinpa Price (born 1981) Senator for the Northern Territory (2022–)		Shadow Minister for Defence Industry (until 10 September 2025); Shadow Minister for Defence Personnel (until 10 September 2025)	

=== Shadow assistant ministry ===
Party	Shadow Minister	Portrait	Offices	Ref
Liberal	Zoe McKenzie (born 1972) MP for Flinders (Vic.) (2022–)		Shadow Cabinet Secretary (since 13 October 2025); Shadow Assistant Minister for Education and Early Learning	
Liberal	Maria Kovacic (born 1970) Senator for New South Wales (2023–)		Shadow Assistant Minister to the Leader of the Opposition; Shadow Assistant Minister for Women; Shadow Assistant Minister for Child Protection and the Prevention of Family Violence	
Liberal	Dave Sharma (born 1975) Senator for New South Wales (2023–); MP for Wentworth (NSW) (2019–2022)		Shadow Assistant Minister for Competition, Charities and Treasury	
Liberal	Matt O'Sullivan (born 1978) Senator for Western Australia (2019–)		Shadow Assistant Minister for Fisheries and Forestry; Shadow Assistant Minister for Infrastructure	
Liberal	Dean Smith (born 1969) Senator for Western Australia (2012–)		Shadow Assistant Minister for Foreign Affairs and Trade; Shadow Assistant Minister for Energy and Emissions Reduction	
Liberal (LNP)	Phillip Thompson (born 1988) MP for Herbert (Qld.) (2019–)		Shadow Assistant Minister for the National Disability Insurance Scheme; Shadow Assistant Minister for Defence	
National (LNP)	Andrew Willcox (born 1969) MP for Dawson (Qld.) (2022–)		Shadow Assistant Minister for Manufacturing and Sovereign Capability	
Liberal	Leah Blyth Senator for South Australia (2025–)		Shadow Assistant Minister for Stronger Families and Stronger Communities	
National	Jamie Chaffey MP for Parkes (NSW) (2025–)		Shadow Assistant Minister for Agriculture; Shadow Assistant Minister for Resources	
National	Sam Birrell (1975–) MP for Nicholls (Vic.) (2022–)		Shadow Assistant Minister for Regional Health; Shadow Assistant Minister for Regional Education	
Liberal	Simon Kennedy (born 1982) MP for Cook (NSW) (2024–)		Shadow Assistant Minister for Artificial Intelligence and the Digital Economy (since 14 September 2025); Shadow Assistant Minister for Scrutiny of Government Waste (since 14 September 2025)	
Liberal	Aaron Violi (born 1984) MP for Casey (VIC) (2022–)		Shadow Assistant Minister for Communications (since 13 October 2025)	
Liberal (LNP)	Cameron Caldwell (born 1979) MP for Fadden (QLD) (2023–)		Shadow Assistant Minister for Mental Health(since 13 October 2025); Shadow Assistant Minister for Housing (since 13 October 2025)	
Provisionally appointed but never finalised
Liberal	Gisele Kapterian		Provisionally appointed pending recount challenge of Bradfield, challenge abandoned in September 2025 and Kapterian not elected to parliament: Shadow Assistant Minister for Communications; Shadow Assistant Minister for Technology and the Digital Economy	

== See also ==
- 2025 Liberal Party of Australia leadership election
- 2025 National Party of Australia leadership spill
- Second Albanese ministry
