= Hollie Hughes (politician) =

Australian politician (born 1975)

Senator for New South Wales
- In office 1 July 2019 – 30 June 2025
- Succeeded by: Jessica Collins

Personal details
- Born: Hollie Alexandra Nolan; 12 February 1975 (age 51) Adelaide, South Australia
- Citizenship: Australian
- Party: One Nation (since 2026) Liberal (until 2025)
- Education: Charles Sturt University; Macquarie University
- Occupation: Politician

Hollie Alexandra Hughes (née Nolan; born 12 February 1975) is an Australian politician. She served as a Senator for New South Wales from 2019 to 2025, representing the Liberal Party.

Hughes was an unsuccessful Senate candidate at the 2016 federal election. During the 2017 parliamentary eligibility crisis, she won the countback to determine the replacement for disqualified Senator Fiona Nash, but was not declared elected because the High Court of Australia, sitting as the Court of Disputed Returns, ruled that she was ineligible for election, due to her employment as a member of the Administrative Appeals Tribunal.

In November 2018, Hughes won the most votes in the Liberal Party's Senate preselection ballot for the 2019 federal election. She was first on the Coalition's Senate ticket in New South Wales at the 2019 election.

== Early life and education ==
Hughes was born in Adelaide on 12 February 1975. She is the oldest of three children born to June and Dennis Nolan. She attended Perth's John XXIII College and Sydney's Loreto Kirribilli during her school years. She studied for a Bachelor of Arts (Communications) at Charles Sturt University in Bathurst, graduating in 1997. Later, she completed a masters degree in public policy at Macquarie University, graduating in 2007.

== Early career ==
Hughes worked as an adviser to Liberal senators Bill Heffernan (2003–2005) and Concetta Fierravanti-Wells (2005–2007).

Hughes was in fourth spot on the Coalition ticket for the 2010 half-Senate election. She was in the tenth spot on the Coalition ticket for the 2015 Legislative Council election. In 2016, she was set to be in the first spot on the Coalition ticket for the anticipated half-Senate election, ahead of Concetta Fierravanti-Wells, but when a double dissolution election was called, she was nominated in sixth spot on the Coalition ticket for the double dissolution election.

As of 2017, Hughes had spent a decade on the State Executive of the Liberal Party of Australia and attained the position of Country Vice-President of the State Party during this tenure. Hughes was described by ABC News as a "regional powerbroker" of the party, advocating for the people of rural New South Wales, whose political views were centre-right, with a particular focus on issues pertaining to rural Australia, and garnering support for people living with disabilities. The Liberal Party described her as a "passionate advocate for rural and regional New South Wales, having led campaigns to improve transport options and health services for the bush".

She was the founder and chair of the Country Autism Network, created to facilitate greater community awareness of regional children affected by autism, and develop more sophisticated support mechanisms for them and their families. Hughes began the network following the diagnosis of her middle child with autism, recognising a lack of support and relevant information available to families in regional areas regarding the condition.

Hughes worked in the private sector as a senior consultant for the Human Resources consultancy Salt & Shein.

After ostensibly failing to be elected to the Senate in 2016, Hughes was appointed to the Administrative Appeals Tribunal, where she worked in part-time capacity. In 2017, when Senator Fiona Nash was found to be ineligible, making Hughes likely to be found to be her replacement, Hughes resigned from this position in an attempt to prevent herself from being found ineligible.

== Parliamentary eligibility crisis ==
At the 2016 double dissolution election, Hughes ran for the Senate to represent New South Wales, in the sixth position on the Coalition ticket, which was considered to be unwinnable. However, during the 2017 Australian parliamentary eligibility crisis, Senator Fiona Nash of the National Party was found to be ineligible to sit in the senate under Section 44(i) of the Constitution due to being a British Citizen. Hughes, as the first unelected candidate on the Coalition's New South Wales ticket, was expected to be declared elected upon a countback of New South Wales Senate votes that excluded Nash.

On 1 July 2017, long after the 2016 federal election, Hughes was appointed to the Administrative Appeals Tribunal, a government body which provides autonomous assessment of decisions made by Australian administrative bodies including the Department of Immigration, Department of Home Affairs and Department of Human Services. Under Section 44(iv) of the Constitution, any person who "[h]olds any office of profit under the Crown" is "incapable of being chosen or of sitting as a senator", with her position on the Tribunal being such an office. 45 minutes after the ruling that Nash was ineligible was handed down, Hughes resigned from her position on the Administrative Appeals Tribunal, in an attempt to ensure her eligibility for election to the Senate.

After the countbacks conducted as a result of the High Court's judgement in the Citizenship Seven case selected replacements for the disqualified senators, while the High Court immediately declared other selected candidates elected, the High Court decided to first further investigate Hughes' own eligibility due to her position on the Administrative Appeals Tribunal. The Court had to determine whether Hughes' subsequent resignation from the position on the Tribunal would render her eligible, or whether this resignation was ineffective in terms of remedying her prior ineligibility for parliament.

=== High Court decision ===
On 27 October 2017, the High Court, sitting as the Court of Disputed Returns, considered issues raised by the Senate referring to Section 376 of the Commonwealth Electoral Act. The primary issues of contention were the timing of Hughes' appointment to the Australian Administrative Appeals Tribunal and the subsequent recount which took place. In the judgement, delivered by Chief Justice Susan Kiefel and Justices Virginia Bell, Stephen Gageler, Patrick Keane and James Edelman, the court noted that the prevailing issue was "whether holding that disqualifying office during the discrete period between 1 July and 27 October was enough to render Ms Hughes incapable of being chosen". In an affidavit submitted to the Court by Hughes' solicitor, it was submitted that at the date of the 2016 election, Hughes held no such position and was thus eligible to be nominated, despite her subsequent appointment to the tribunal. The issue facing the Court was whether Hughes' appointment in 2017 had occurred during the "election period" and thus whether she held an office of profit under the crown prior to or during the process of her being chosen as a Senator.

The High Court found Hughes to be ineligible for election as a senator in parliament, ruling that the period during which she held the position on the tribunal was technically a part of the election period. The summons made by the attorney general for Hughes to be declared duly elected to the Senate, following the special count, was dismissed. Considering Hughes' appointment as a part-time member of the Administrative Appeals Tribunal on 1 July 2017, the Court held that the position made her "incapable of being chosen" under Section 44(iv) of the Commonwealth Constitution.

The court explicitly acknowledged the "harsh and technical" nature of the judgement, with reference to how Hughes' appointment was understandable given the nature of the position and the remuneration which accompanied it. However, the voluntary means by which she accepted the position, and the circumstances where disqualification was always a possibility, meant that the terms of section 44 of the Constitution meant that she was incapable of being chosen for the Senate. The "voluntary step" taken by Hughes, in accepting a government job, meant that she effectively relinquished "the opportunity to benefit in the future from any special count of the ballot papers."

Following the judgement, Hughes lamented a lost opportunity to represent the people of rural Australia. The decision fuelled debate around the Court's approach to Section 44 of the Constitution, with the Attorney-General George Brandis noting the ambiguity which surrounded the decision. The principle which emerged is that if a public servant runs for office, loses the election but may be eligible to replace a vacancy subsequently created in the parliamentary term, they should not return to their profession as this will forfeit any potential to fill a future vacancy.

== Subsequent career ==
After her involvement in the eligibility crisis, her political involvement with the Liberal Party was somewhat diminished, but she retained her position on the NSW State Executive of the Party, and pursued alternative professional interests in the private sector.

In June 2018, it was reported that Hughes had been ousted from her position as Liberal Party Country Vice-President, after it was revealed that she was living on the North Shore of Sydney. However, because she was a member of the federal executive of the party, she remained on the state executive, but as a non-voting member. That meant she could not take part in a number of Liberal Party preselection decisions.

After the 2022 Australian federal election, Hughes claimed that the Australian Education System was run by Marxists, stating, "...we've got an education system that’s basically run by Marxists. When kids are at school and they’re being taught all this absolute leftwing rubbish, that’s where they’re leaving school and that’s where they’re landing." Education Minister Jason Clare criticised the comments as "crazy".

== Election to the Senate ==
In November 2018, Hughes won the most votes in the Liberal Party's New South Wales Senate preselection ballot for the 2019 federal election, and was placed first on the Coalition's Senate ticket for the state. She and runner-up Andrew Bragg out-polled an incumbent senator, Jim Molan, who had been placed in the "unwinnable" fourth position on the ticket, below the candidate for the National Party.

Hughes is currently the Co-Chair of the Parliamentary Friends of Autism, as well as the Parliamentary Friends of Australian Books and Writers.

In May 2024, Hughes accused Fatima Payman of "supporting terrorists" after Payman accused Israel of committing genocide during Gaza war and used phrase "from the river to the sea Palestine will be free". Hughes is a Zionist.

Hughes was a member of the centre-right faction of the Liberal Party.

Hughes endorsed Sussan Ley for the 2025 Liberal Party of Australia leadership election.

In November 2025, Hughes resigned from the Liberal Party live on radio station 2GB. In May 2026, Hughes joined One Nation.

== Personal life ==
Hughes has spent the majority of her adult life living in regional New South Wales, with her family life being predominantly spent on a farm west of Moree with her three children. The family moved to Sydney in 2019. Her middle son has been diagnosed as autistic.

As of November 2025, Hughes owns a pub in Rydal in New South Wales.
