= February 2026 National Party of Australia leadership spill motion =

Australian political party election

2026 National Party of Australia leadership spill motion
- 2 February 2026
- Leadership spill motion

18 caucus members of the National Party 10 votes needed to spill leadership
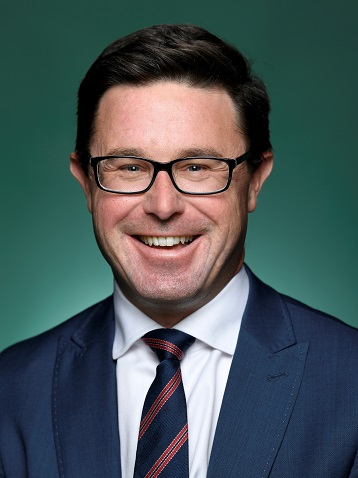

Candidate	David Littleproud	Spill motion
Caucus vote	≥10	<10
Seat	Maranoa (Qld)
Leader before election
David Littleproud
Elected Leader
David Littleproud

A leadership spill motion was launched on 2 February 2026 to vacate the leadership position of the National Party of Australia. Incumbent leader David Littleproud was re-elected, defeating the motion. The spill motion was moved by Queensland MP Colin Boyce, who initially called for a spill in January.

== Background ==
In the wake of the 2025 Bondi Beach shooting, the Albanese government introduced legislation to amend hate speech laws in Australia. Internal disputes within the Liberal–National Coalition over the issue to support the legislation precipitated Littleproud's announcement of the National Party's split from the Coalition.

This marked the second instance in one parliamentary term, and under Littleproud's leadership, where the Coalition split. The first split occurred on 20 May 2025, following the Labor Party's landslide victory at the 2025 election.

The Coalition split after all Nationals frontbenchers including Littleproud resigned from the shadow ministry in 'solidarity', after the resignation of senators Susan McDonald, Bridget McKenzie, and Ross Cadell, who were all shadow cabinet ministers at the time for voting against the official Coalition position. The following day, Littleproud announced that the Nationals would be leaving the Coalition, citing that "The Nationals cannot be part of a shadow ministry while Sussan Ley is the leader".

Following this, on 28 January 2026, Boyce announced that he would be challenging Littleproud for the leadership of the National Party of Australia, citing that leaving the Coalition was "political suicide", and stating that "David has made some bad decisions recently". This move to challenge Littleproud for the leadership was reportedly a surprise to National members.

== Results ==
The National Party party room meeting called by Boyce was held on 2 February 2026. All 18 members of the federal caucus of the party voted on the decision to pass the spill motion, with the motion failing. The internal ballots of the National Party are not officially released; a minimum of 10 caucus votes are required to reject or pass a spill motion. With the spill motion being rejected, Littleproud retained his leadership of the National Party.

== Endorsements ==
=== David Littleproud ===
List of David Littleproud endorsements

Federal Nationals members

- Darren Chester — MP for Gippsland
- Kevin Hogan — MP for Page and Deputy Leader of the National Party
- Matt Canavan — Senator for Queensland

== See also ==
- 2026 Liberal Party of Australia leadership spill
