= Jess Walsh =

Australian politician and trade unionist

Senator the Honourable Dr Jess Walsh
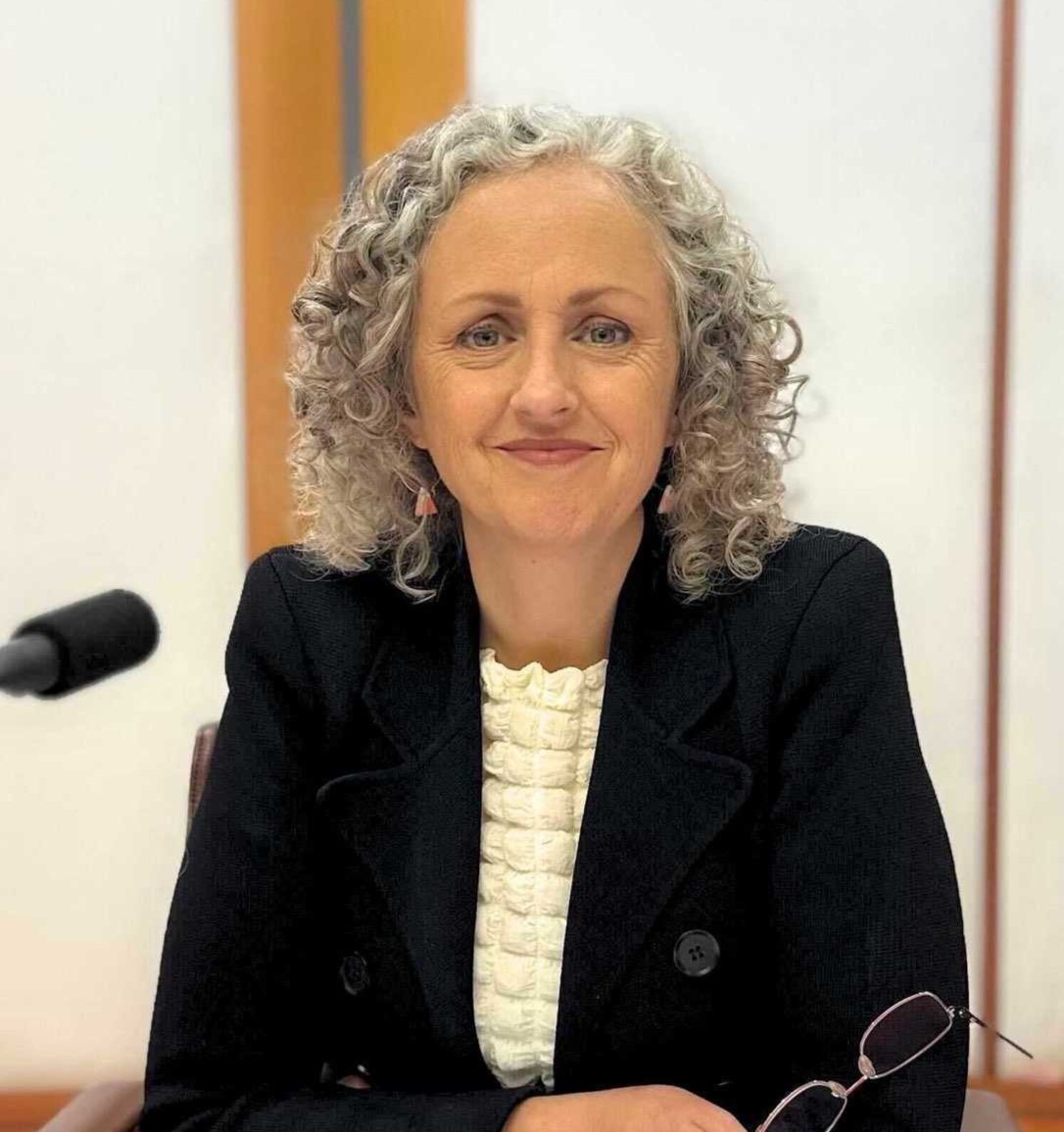

Minister for Early Childhood Education
- Incumbent
- Assumed office 13 May 2025
- Prime Minister: Anthony Albanese
- Preceded by: Anne Aly

Minister for Youth
- Incumbent
- Assumed office 13 May 2025
- Prime Minister: Anthony Albanese
- Preceded by: Anne Aly

Senator for Victoria
- Incumbent
- Assumed office 1 July 2019
- Preceded by: Derryn Hinch

Personal details
- Born: 16 May 1971 (age 55) Melbourne, Victoria
- Party: Labor
- Education: University of Melbourne (PhD, 2002); University of Southern California (MA, 1997)
- Occupation: Researcher, trade unionist
- Website: www.jesswalsh.com.au

Jessica Cecille Walsh (born 16 May 1971) is an Australian politician and trade unionist. She is a member of the Australian Labor Party (ALP) and has served as a Senator for Victoria since 2019. Since 2025, she has held the position of Minister for Early Childhood Education and Minister for Youth in the second Albanese ministry. Prior to her election to parliament, she was the state secretary of United Voice.

== Early life ==
Walsh was born in Melbourne on 16 May 1971. She grew up in the suburb of North Balwyn. She holds the degrees of Bachelor of Arts (Hons.) from the University of Melbourne, Master of Arts from the University of Southern California, and Doctor of Philosophy in economic geography from the University of Melbourne. Her doctoral thesis was titled "Organising the low-wage service sector: labour, community and urban politics in the United States".

== Career ==
From 1998 to 2000, Walsh was a research fellow at two progressive think tanks in the United States, the Institute for Policy Studies and the Economic Policy Institute. There she researched "the loss of decent, stable manufacturing jobs and the growth in their place of low-paid and insecure work in service industries". After returning to Australia, Walsh worked as a researcher and organiser for the Victorian branch of United Voice from 2002 to 2006. She then served as assistant state secretary from 2006 to 2007 and as state secretary from 2007 to 2019.

Walsh was elected to the Senate at the 2019 Australian federal election. She serves as Chair of the Senate Economics Committee and is a member of the Parliamentary Joint Committee on Intelligence and Security.

== Politics ==
Walsh joined the ALP in 2005. In 2018 she won ALP preselection for the Senate in second position on the party's ticket in Victoria. The party's left faction demoted incumbent senator Gavin Marshall to the third spot after Raff Ciccone and Walsh.

Walsh was elected to the Senate at the 2019 federal election, to a six-year term beginning on 1 July 2019. In 2022 she was appointed chair of the Senate's economics legislation committee. Following the 2025 Australian federal election in which the Labor government was re-elected, she was appointed Minister for Early Childhood Education and Minister for Youth in the second Albanese ministry.

== Personal life ==
Walsh has two residential properties in Melbourne and South Gippsland. She has an investment property in Byron Bay.
