= Minister for Early Childhood Education =

Australian ministerial position

- Commonwealth Coat of Arms

- Flag of Australia

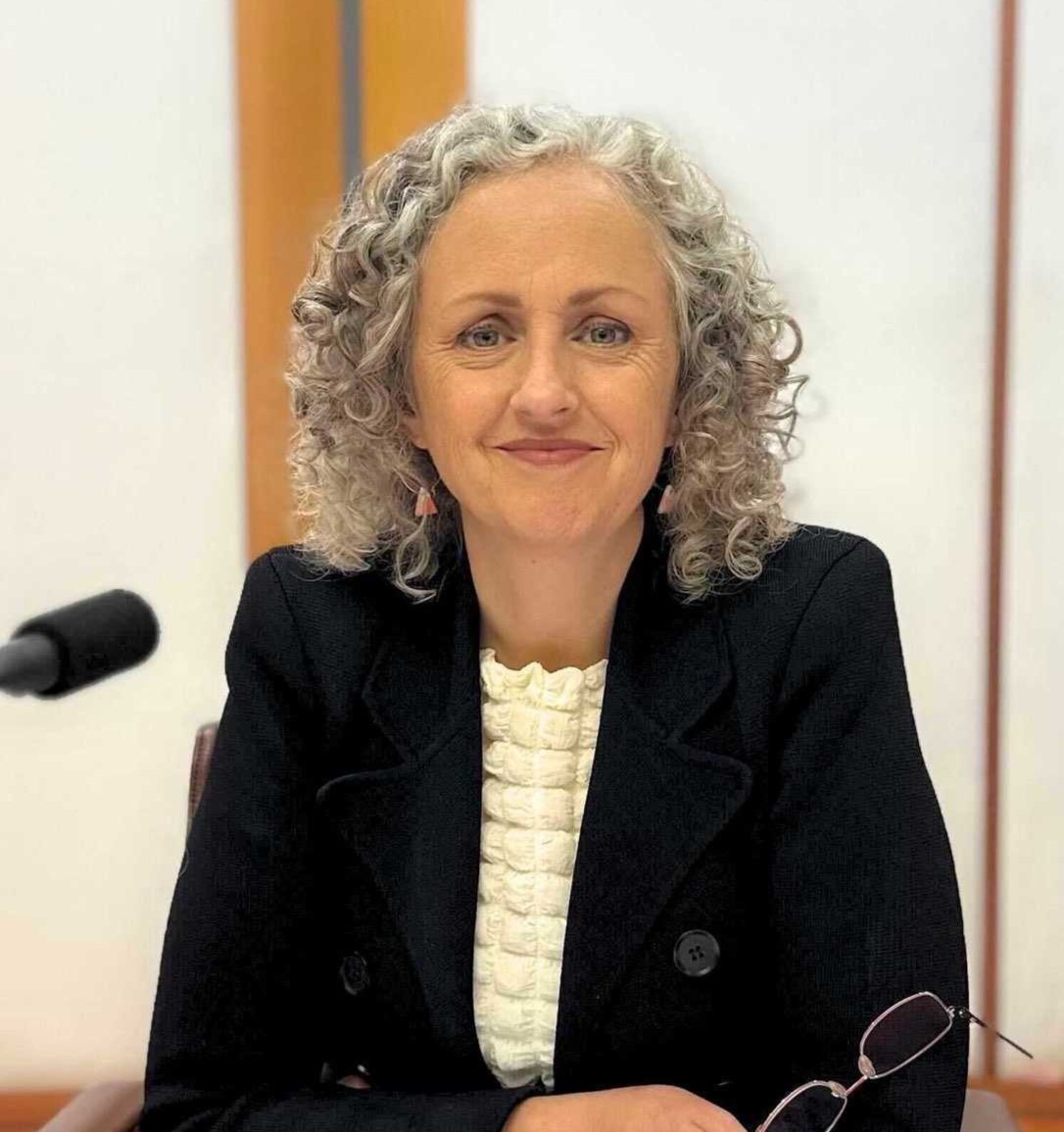
- Incumbent; Jess Walsh since 13 May 2025
- Department of Education
- Style: The Honourable
- Appointer: Governor-General on the advice of the prime minister
- Inaugural holder: Maxine McKew (as Parliamentary Secretary for Early Childhood Education and Childcare)
- Formation: 9 June 2009
- Website: ministers.education.gov.au/senator-hon-dr-jess-walsh

The Minister for Early Childhood Education is an Australian Government ministerial position which is currently held by Jess Walsh following her swearing-in on 13 May 2025 as a result of Anthony Albanese's Labor government being re-elected at the 2025 Australian federal election.

== List of cabinet ministers for early childhood education ==
The following individuals have been appointed as Minister for Early Childhood Education, or any precedent title and sat in the Cabinet:

Order	Minister	Party	Ministry	Ministerial title	Term start	Term end	Term in office
1	Peter Garrett	Labor	2nd Gillard	Minister for School Education, Early Childhood and Youth	14 September 2010	1 July 2013	2 years, 290 days

== List of ministers for early childhood education outside of cabinet ==
The following individuals have been appointed as Minister for Early Childhood Education, or any precedent title but did not sit in the Cabinet:

Order	Minister	Party	Ministry	Ministerial title	Term start	Term end	Term in office
1	Margaret Guilfoyle	Liberal	2nd Fraser	Minister Assisting the Prime Minister in Child Care Matters	22 December 1975	23 June 1976	184 days
2	Kate Ellis	Labor	1st Rudd	Minister for Early Childhood Education, Childcare and Youth	9 June 2009	24 June 2010	4 years, 101 days
2	Kate Ellis	Labor	1st Gillard	Minister for Early Childhood Education, Childcare and Youth	24 June 2010	14 September 2010	4 years, 101 days
2	Kate Ellis	Labor	2nd Gillard	Minister for Employment Participation and Childcare	14 September 2010	14 December 2011	4 years, 101 days
2	Kate Ellis	Labor	2nd Gillard	Minister for Early Childhood and Childcare	14 December 2011	1 July 2013	4 years, 101 days
2	Kate Ellis	Labor	2nd Rudd	Minister for Early Childhood, Childcare and Youth	1 July 2013	18 September 2013	4 years, 101 days
3	Anne Aly	Labor	1st Albanese	Minister for Early Childhood Education	1 June 2022	13 May 2025	2 years, 346 days
4	Jess Walsh	Labor	2nd Albanese	Minister for Early Childhood Education	13 May 2025	Incumbent	1 year, 117 days

== List of assistant ministers ==
The following individuals have been appointed as parliamentary secretaries and assistant ministers for early childhood education or any of its precedent titles:

Order	Minister	Party	Ministry	Ministerial title	Term start	Term end	Term in office
1	Maxine McKew	Labor	1st Rudd	Parliamentary Secretary for Early Childhood Education and Childcare	3 December 2007	9 June 2009	1 year, 188 days
