= Jessica Collins (politician) =

Australian politician

Senator Jessica Collins

Senator for New South Wales
- Incumbent
- Assumed office 1 July 2025
- Preceded by: Hollie Hughes

Personal details
- Born: Jessica Nancy Bird; 3 October 1983 (age 42) New Zealand
- Party: Liberal
- Website: nswliberal.org.au/jess-collins

Jessica Nancy Collins (née Bird) is an Australian politician from the Liberal Party of Australia. She was elected in the 2025 federal election and began her six-year term as Senator for New South Wales on 1 July 2025. She was second on the Coalition list, ahead of Perin Davey and Hollie Hughes who were not re-elected. Senator Collins has been reportedly backed by the 'Right Faction' despite having worked in the office of Alex Hawke MP, the leader of the NSW 'Centre Right' faction.

In February 2026, a leadership spill motion was launched by Collins and Phillip Thompson.

In June 2026 the husband of Liberal senator Jess Collins, Ben Collins, had been the subject of at least two formal complaints to the NSW Liberal Party over alleged intimidating and aggressive behaviour. These reports span several years.
