= Anne Aly =

Australian politician and academic (born 1967)

The Honourable Anne Aly MP
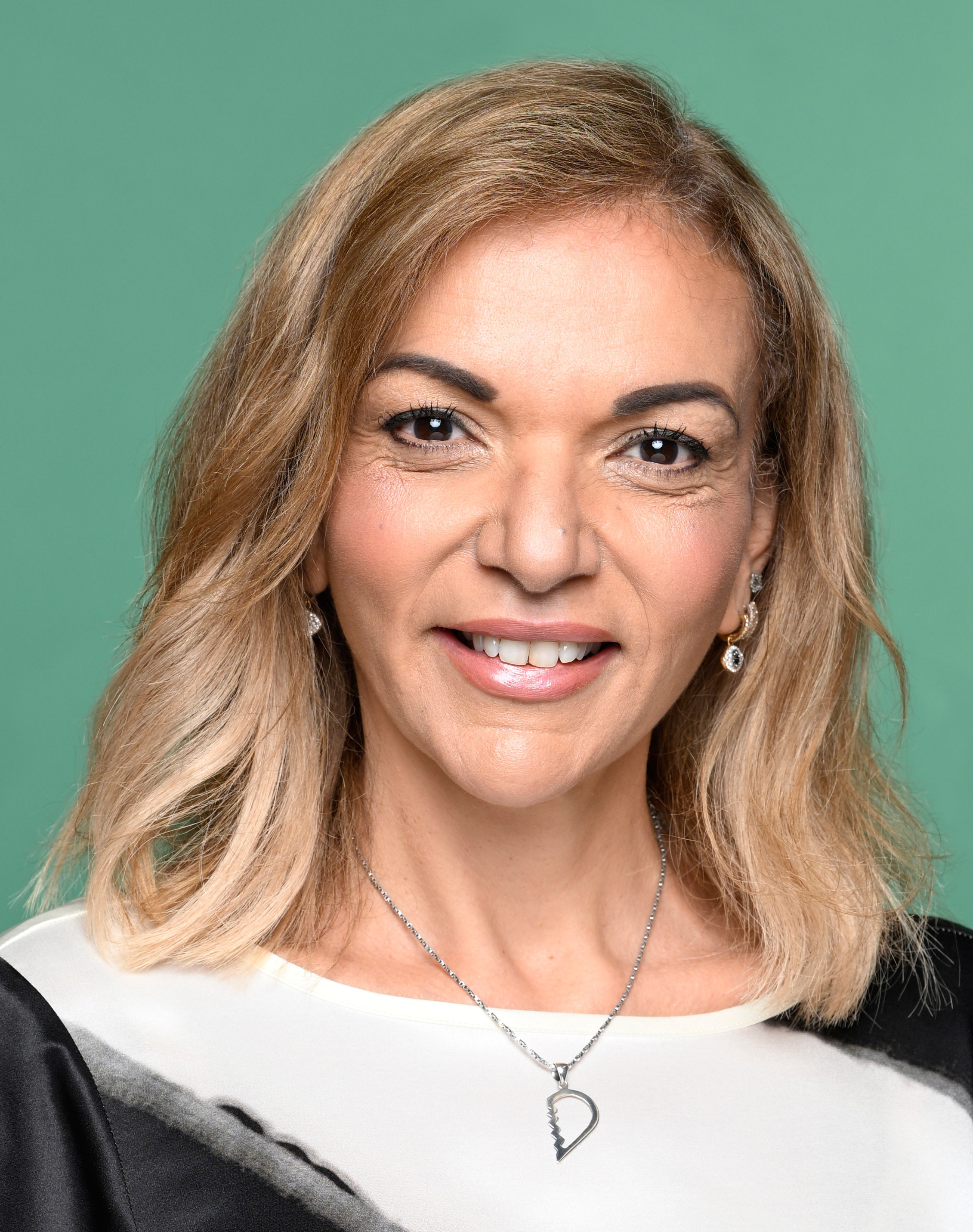
- Official portrait, 2025

Minister for Small Business
- Incumbent
- Assumed office 13 May 2025
- Prime Minister: Anthony Albanese
- Preceded by: Julie Collins

Minister for International Development
- Incumbent
- Assumed office 13 May 2025
- Prime Minister: Anthony Albanese
- Preceded by: Pat Conroy

Minister for Multicultural Affairs
- Incumbent
- Assumed office 13 May 2025
- Prime Minister: Anthony Albanese
- Preceded by: Tony Burke

Minister assisting the Minister for the National Disability Insurance Scheme
- In office 20 January 2025 – 13 May 2025
- Prime Minister: Anthony Albanese
- Minister: Amanda Rishworth
- Preceded by: Position established
- Succeeded by: Jenny McAllister

Minister for Early Childhood Education
- In office 1 June 2022 – 13 May 2025
- Prime Minister: Anthony Albanese
- Preceded by: Alan Tudge
- Succeeded by: Jess Walsh

Minister for Youth
- In office 1 June 2022 – 13 May 2025
- Prime Minister: Anthony Albanese
- Preceded by: Alan Tudge
- Succeeded by: Jess Walsh

Member of Parliament for Cowan
- Incumbent
- Assumed office 2 July 2016
- Preceded by: Luke Simpkins

Personal details
- Born: Azza Mahmoud Fawzi Hosseini Ali el Serougi; 29 March 1967 (age 59) Alexandria, United Arab Republic
- Party: Labor
- Spouse: David Allen
- Children: 2
- Education: Meriden
- Alma mater: American University of Cairo (BA), Edith Cowan University (PhD)(PGDA)(MEd)
- Occupation: Academic; Politician
- Website: www.annealy.com

Anne Azza Aly (Arabic: آني علي, born Azza Mahmoud Fawzi Hosseini Ali el Serougi, 29 March 1967) is an Australian politician who has been a Labor member of the House of Representatives since the 2016 election, representing the electorate of Cowan in Western Australia. In 2025, Aly became Minister for Small Business, Minister for International Development and Minister for Multicultural Affairs, joining Albanese's cabinet. She held the Minister for Early Childhood Education and Minister for Youth portfolio in the Albanese ministry from 2022 to 2025.

Aly is the first female federal parliamentarian of Islamic faith and one of Australia's first two government ministers to be Muslim. She is the first female Muslim national cabinet member in Australian history.

Aly was a professor, lecturer and academic specialising in counter-terrorism, and she is considered a global authority on understanding how and why young people are drawn into violent extremism. Aly founded People Against Violent Extremism (PaVE) to address extremism in Australia.

== Early life and education ==
Aly was born in Alexandria, Egypt (then known under the short-lived United Arab Republic) on 29 March 1967. Her mother was a nurse and her father an engineer. When Aly was two years old she and her parents moved to Australia via an assisted migration program, living first in Queensland, before settling in the western Sydney suburbs Lakemba and Chipping Norton, where Aly attended a private Anglican girls' school, Meriden, and her parents worked in factories and as a bus driver.

Aly returned to Egypt for university, then returned to Australia with her first husband to raise their children in Perth close to her retired parents.

Aly graduated from the American University in Cairo in 1990 with a Bachelor of Arts degree with high honours in English Literature, with a minor in Acting; and in 1994, received a Graduate Diploma of Arts (Language Studies) from Edith Cowan University; followed by a Master of Education degree in 1996, and PhD in 2008, both from Edith Cowan University. Her PhD thesis focused on media and culture, and was entitled A study of audience responses to the media discourse about the 'Other': The Fear of Terrorism between Australian Muslims and the Broader Community.

Aly was one of eleven MPs in the 46th Parliament of Australia who possesses a PhD, the others being Katie Allen, Fiona Martin, Jim Chalmers, Andrew Leigh, Daniel Mulino, Jess Walsh, Adam Bandt, Mehreen Faruqi, Anne Webster and Helen Haines.

== Early career ==
While studying, Aly worked part-time teaching English to migrants. In 2001 Aly became a policy officer for the Government of Western Australia, where she worked in education and multicultural affairs policy from 2000 to 2007, including as a senior policy officer in the Office of Multicultural Interests from 2003. After the September 11 attacks in the US she worked on Western Australia's response to the Federal Government's counter-terrorism action plan.

From 2007 to 2008, Aly worked for the Equal Opportunity Commission WA.

Aly operated her own policy consulting firm from 2011.

== Academic career ==
Aly lectured in counter-terrorism and security at Edith Cowan University from 2009 to 2011, and then at Curtin University from 2011. She was appointed associate professor at Curtin in 2014, and Professor at Edith Cowan in 2015. Aly is an active member of Curtin University's The Centre for Culture and Technology, leading its Countering Online Violent Extremism research program. Aly has published academic papers and books, and newspaper articles, on terrorist recruitment and counter-messaging, and the involvement of former white supremacists in speaking out against violent extremism.

In 2008, Aly received the Dean's Award for Best New Researcher from Edith Cowan University. In 2009, she won a Publication Award from the Australian Institute of Professional Intelligence Officers, and she was appointed to the Council for Australian Arab Relations at Department of Foreign Affairs and Trade, and remained on the board for six years.

In 2011, she was inducted into the Western Australian Women's Hall of Fame.

Aly's research has been funded by the Australian Research Council's Safeguarding Australia Initiative. In 2011, former prime minister Kevin Rudd launched Aly's first book, Terrorism & Global Security: Historical and Contemporary Perspectives.

In 2013, Aly founded a youth-led not-for-profit organisation, People Against Violent Extremism (PaVE), to address extremism in Australia. PaVE received a $115,000 grant from the federal Attorney-General's Department to develop videos to counter extremism, and in 2015, Aly announced that PaVE had raised $40,800 for a mentoring program for young activists. The mentoring program includes training through MyHack, which trains university students to brainstorm and develop counter-messaging to extremist propaganda online.

In 2015, Aly was the only Australian invited to address Barack Obama's Countering Violent Extremism summit at the White House.

In 2016, Aly was nominated for Australian of the Year.

== Political career ==
=== Opposition (2016–2022) ===
Aly was preselected as the Labor candidate for Cowan for the 2016 federal election and was successful in winning the seat from the incumbent, Luke Simpkins, with a 5.2-point swing, by a margin of 0.68 points.

During the 2016 election campaign, Liberal Party Justice Minister Michael Keenan was accused of starting a smear campaign against Aly in regards to her previous counter-terrorism work at PaVE. Julie Bishop, Mathias Cormann, John Howard, and Luke Simpkins followed Keenan's lead. However, prior to Aly becoming a Labor candidate, Simpkins had written to Aly in 2015 to convey his admiration for her counter-terrorism work including "content of your media interviews and approach to the threat of radicalisation", and Aly's work had been actively supported by the Coalition government.

In 2016, after speaking against comments from Immigration Minister Peter Dutton regarding Lebanese Muslim immigration, Aly was subject to a series of online attacks and death threats directed at her family. Several comments were reported to the Australian Federal Police's Protection Liaison Unit, but no arrests were made.

In 2017, Aly was the victim of a fake-news attack claiming that she refused to lay a wreath at an ANZAC Day service in Perth. The story was promulgated by the Love Australia or Leave Party. Aly asserted that she was "insulted by the allegation she refused to lay a wreath". The leader of the Love Australia or Leave Party later apologised for the social media post and the inaccuracy of the information.

During the 2019 federal election campaign, unauthorised anonymous flyers were distributed in the Cowan electorate targeting Aly with unsubstantiated claims including that she supports policies that were "like Saudi Arabia". The Labor Party condemned the flyers as "racist". This follows anti-Muslim Facebook posts from Queensland Senator Fraser Anning who co-opted an image of a Muslim family taken in 2005 when their 19-month-old daughter Rahma went missing from their Sydney home, along with the words "If you want a Muslim for a neighbour, just vote Labor". Rahma has never been found.

Aly was reelected in the 2019 federal election with a slightly increased margin of 1.6 points.

In August 2019, a man armed with a knife was arrested at Aly's offices in Cowan. According to Aly the man did not make an outright threat but was brandishing "a fairly large kitchen knife".

On 1 October 2021, during a Parliamentary Joint Committee on Intelligence and Security hearing, Anne Aly questioned ASIO Director-General Mike Burgess on the "implications of listing the entirety of Hamas for pro-Palestinian supporters in Australia, particularly those who organise or attend protests." The Joint Committee subsequently recommended the government consider listing Hamas in its entirety as a terrorist organisation on 14 October 2021.

Aly has stated she believes in marriage equality, is economically conservative and "more left" on social policies, believes in a strict separation of church and state, defends the rights of women to wear a hijab if they choose, though she does not wear one herself, and that she demonstrated against the Iraq war. In her maiden speech, Aly highlighted the growing income disparity and her intention to bring the benefits of growth to every suburb.

=== Albanese government (2022–present) ===
Following Labor being elected to government at the 2022 federal election, Aly was appointed Minister for Early Childhood Education and Youth. She also benefited from a statewide swing in Western Australia to the Labor Party, receiving a swing in her seat of Cowan of just under 10 points, making it a safe Labor seat.

On 1 July 2024, after senator Fatima Payman was suspended from the Labor party due to her support of recognizing Palestine, accusing Israel of committing genocide during Gaza war and using the phrase "from river to the sea Palestine will be free", Aly criticised Payman by saying "Fatima chooses to do it her way" and supported the government position of "recognition should be part of a 'just' peace process". She also defended the government's position by saying "I think just saying to recognize Palestinian state without any context is in some ways tokenistic".

Aly held her seat in the 2025 federal election, and was promoted to the cabinet as the Minister for Small Business, International Development, and Multicultural Affairs.

== Personal life ==
Aly is a three-times-married mother of two boys. Aly has two sons from her first marriage. In 2026, her eldest son, Adam Rida, appeared as a contestant on the second season of the Australian game show The Floor. Her current husband is a former police officer and Canadian ice hockey player David Allen.

In interviews and Aly's 2018 autobiography, Finding My Place, she discusses the domestic abuse she suffered at the hands of her first husband, the pressure she was under to stay with him, and the struggle to raise her sons as a single mother after divorce.

Aly lives in Madeley in Western Australia.

== Bibliography ==
- Anne Aly (2011). Terrorism and Global Security: Historical and Contemporary Perspectives. Palgrave Macmillan. ISBN 978-1-4202-5640-6.
- Aly, Anne; Macdonald, Stuart; Jarvis, Lee; Chen, Thomas M., eds. (5 May 2016), Violent extremism online : new perspectives on terrorism and the Internet, Routledge, ISBN 978-1-317-43187-9
- Aly, Anne (26 November 2019), Finding My Place : From Cairo to Canberra – The irresistible story of an irrepressible woman, HarperCollinsPublishers Australia, ISBN 978-0-7333-3848-9

== See also ==
- Radicalization
- United Nations Security Council Counter-Terrorism Committee
- Against Violent Extremism
- Counter Extremism Project

Parliament of Australia
Preceded by Luke Simpkins	Member for Cowan; 2016–present	Incumbent
Political offices
Preceded by Alan Tudge	Minister for Youth; 2022–2025	Succeeded by Jess Walsh
Preceded by Alan Tudge	Minister for Early Childhood Education; 2022–2025	Succeeded by Jess Walsh
Preceded by Tony Burke	Minister for Multicultural Affairs; 2025–present	Incumbent
Preceded by Pat Conroy	Minister for International Development; 2025–present	Incumbent
Preceded by Julie Collins	Minister for Small Business; 2025–present	Incumbent
