= Andrew Bragg =

Australian politician (born 1984)

Senator Andrew Bragg
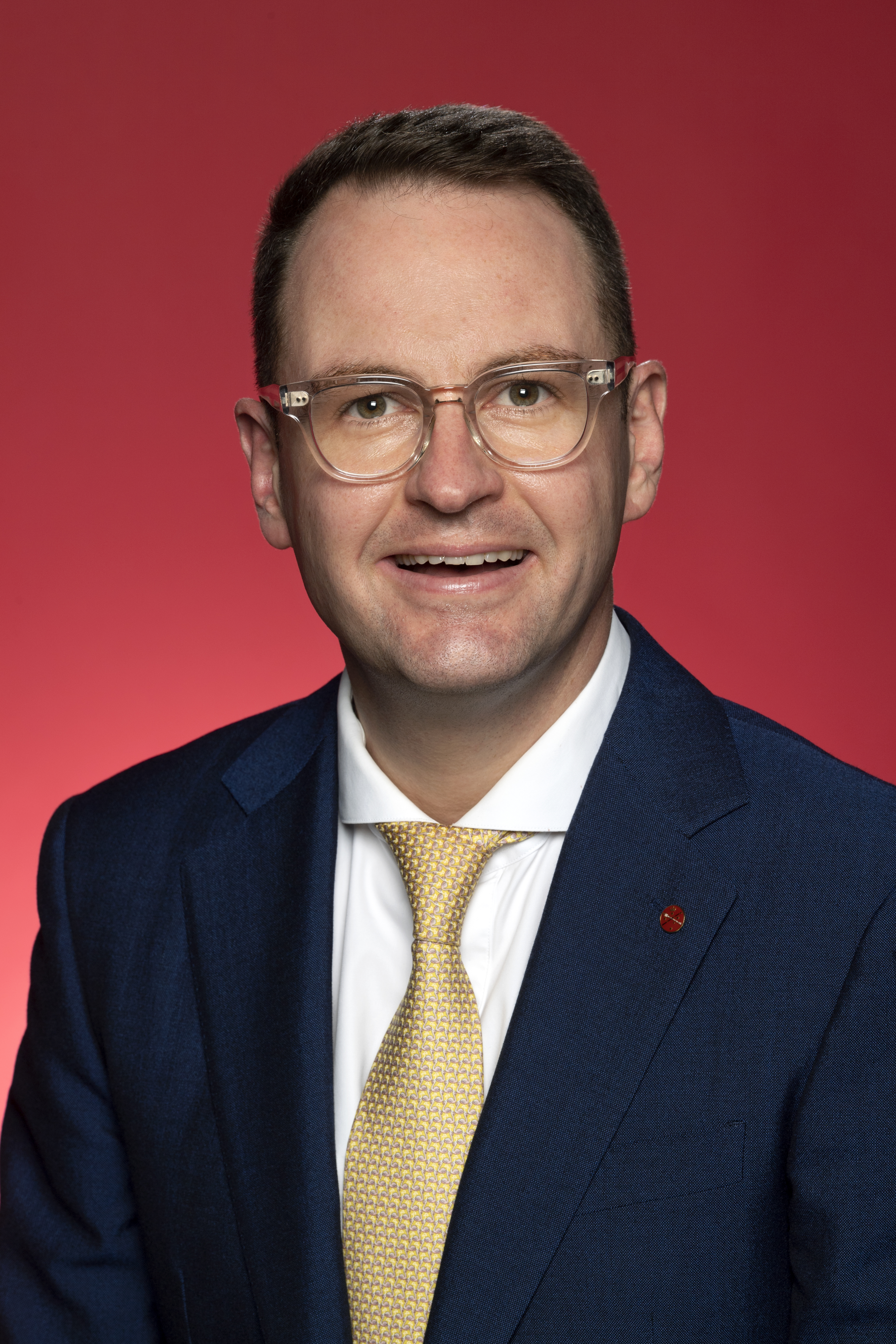
- Official portrait, 2021

Shadow Minister for the Environment
- Incumbent
- Assumed office 17 February 2026
- Leader: Angus Taylor
- Preceded by: Angie Bell

Shadow Minister for Housing and Homelessness
- Incumbent
- Assumed office 28 May 2025
- Leader: Sussan Ley; Angus Taylor
- Preceded by: Michael Sukkar

Shadow Minister for Productivity and Deregulation
- In office 28 May 2025 – 17 February 2026
- Leader: Sussan Ley
- Preceded by: Position established
- Succeeded by: Jane Hume

Shadow Assistant Minister for Home Ownership
- In office 5 March 2024 – 28 May 2025
- Leader: Peter Dutton; Sussan Ley
- Preceded by: Position established
- Succeeded by: Cameron Caldwell (as Shadow Assistant Minister for Housing)

Senator for New South Wales
- Incumbent
- Assumed office 1 July 2019

Personal details
- Born: 11 July 1984 (age 42) Carlton, Victoria, Australia
- Party: Liberal
- Occupation: Accountant; Manager
- Website: www.andrewbragg.com

Andrew James Bragg (born 11 July 1984) is an Australian politician who was elected as a Senator for New South Wales at the 2019 federal election. He is a member of the Liberal Party. A member of several committees related to finance and technology, Bragg advocates changes to the Australian retirement system.

== Early life ==
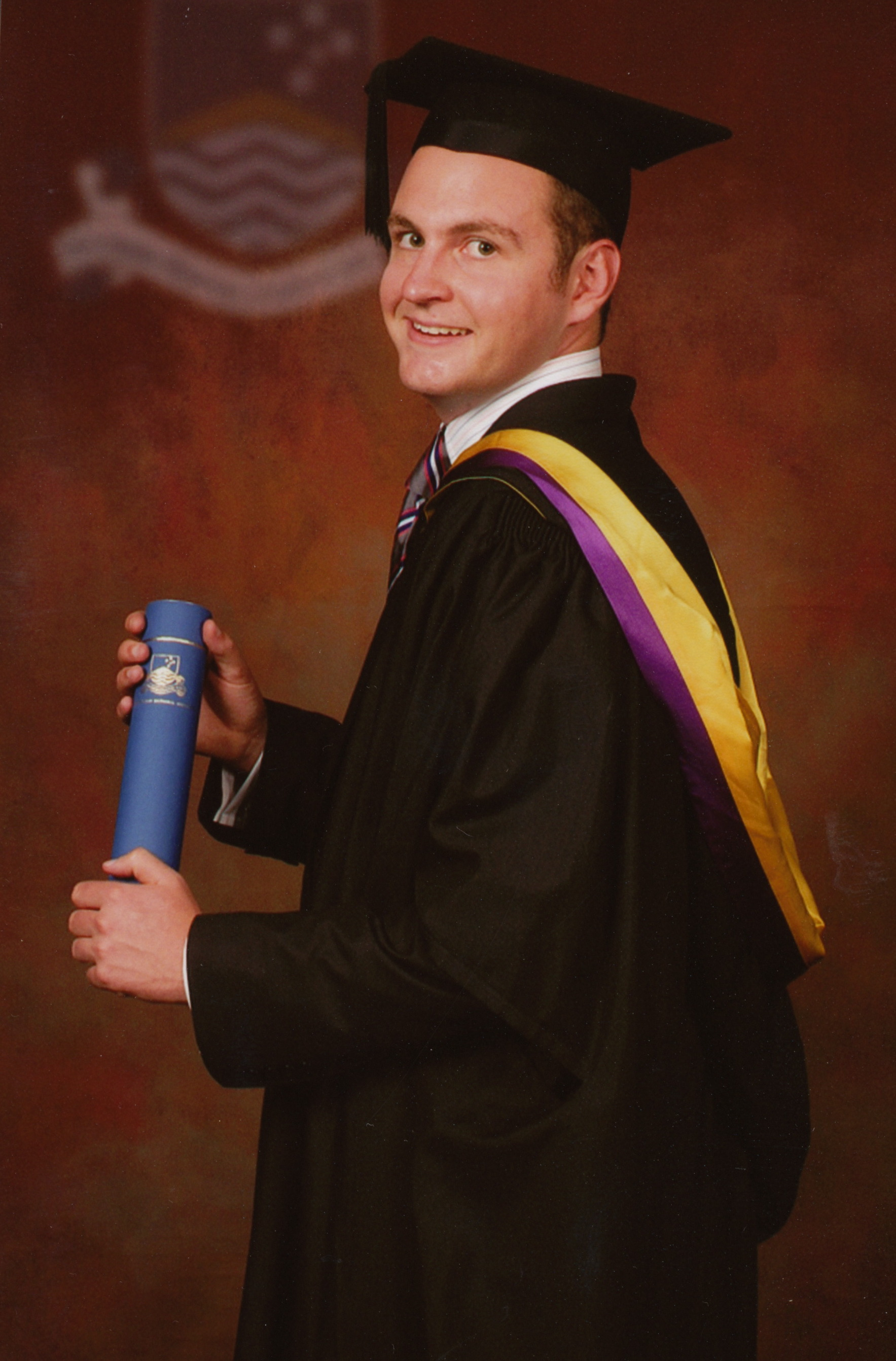
Bragg at University graduation

Bragg was born in Melbourne and grew up in Shepparton, Victoria. He played for the Congupna Football Club. He attended local Catholic schools before going on to study accounting at the Australian National University. Bragg's father and three of his grandparents were born in the United Kingdom, and he was a British citizen by descent until renouncing it in December 2017.

== Career ==
Bragg is a trained accountant who worked in internal audit at Ernst & Young.

He then served seven years at the Financial Services Council first in superannuation and asset management policy and later as head of policy.

From 2014 to 2016, Bragg served as Director of Policy & Global Markets at the Financial Services Council. He worked to establish two key pieces of industry self-regulation: a superannuation governance standard and the Trowbridge Review & the inaugural Life Insurance Consumer Code of Practice.

In November 2016, he became the policy director of the Menzies Research Centre, a Liberal Party think tank. He became the executive director of the Business Council of Australia in August 2017.

During the period he worked for the Financial Services Council, Bragg completed a Master of Financial Regulation from Macquarie University.

== Politics ==
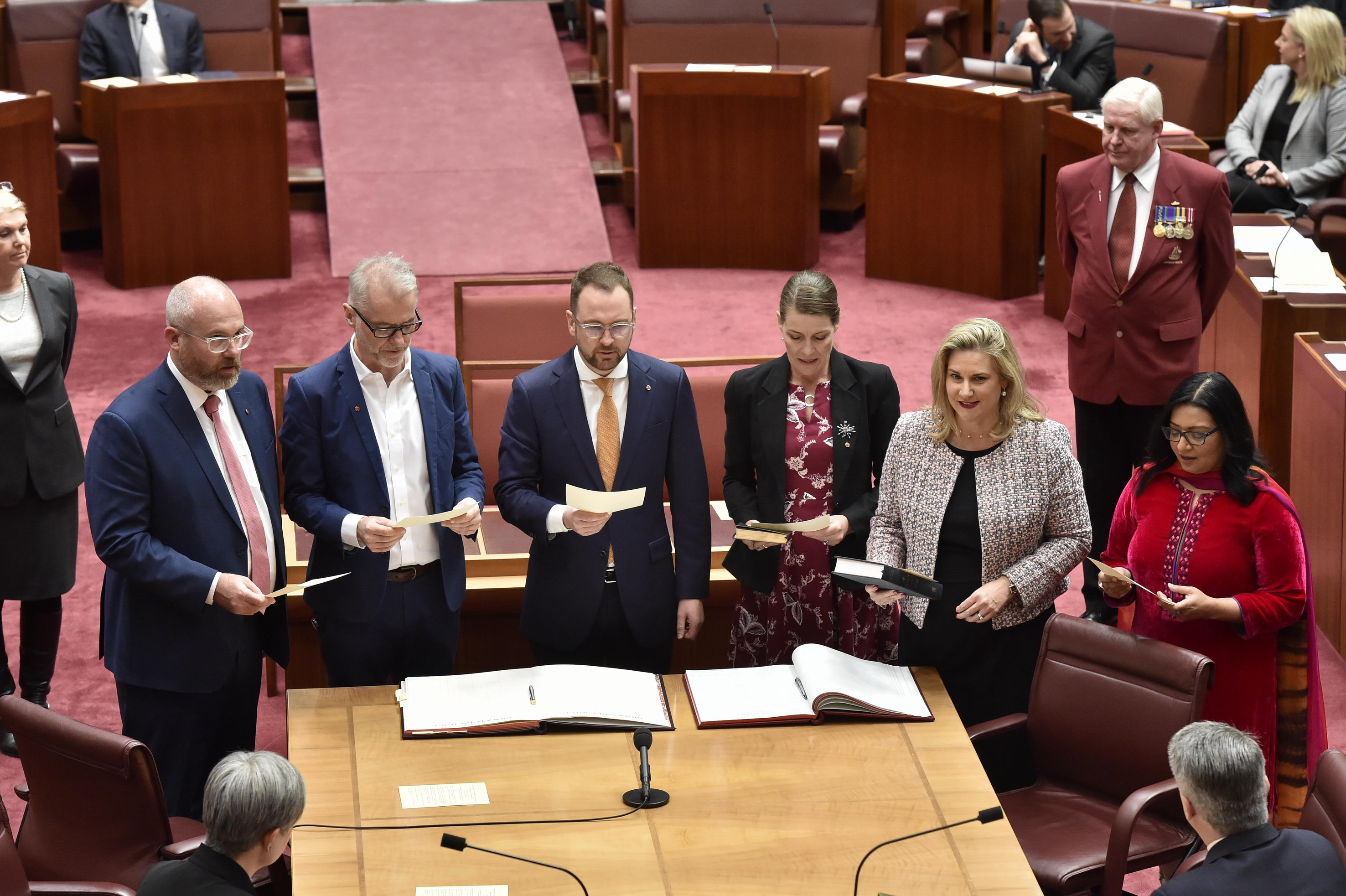
Bragg (centre) at the swearing-in ceremony for senators in 2019

=== Pre-Parliament ===
Prior to the 2016 federal election, Bragg was an unsuccessful Liberal preselection candidate for both the Senate ticket in New South Wales and the Division of Murray in Victoria.

In April 2017, following the resignation of Tony Nutt, Bragg was appointed as the acting federal director of the Liberal Party. He was considered an ally of Prime Minister Malcolm Turnbull. However, he was not chosen to fill the position permanently. Later in the year, he was the national director of the Liberals & Nationals for Yes campaign during the Australian Marriage Law Postal Survey.

Bragg was a candidate for Liberal preselection at the 2018 Wentworth by-election, caused by Turnbull's retirement from parliament. He was considered the frontrunner for a period, but withdrew from the race due to concerns that the preselection of a male candidate would be poorly received. He stated that "the Liberal Party should preselect a woman and my withdrawal can pave the way".

=== 46th Parliament ===
In 2018, Bragg won preselection on the Coalition's Senate ticket. He was elected to the Senate at the 2019 federal election.

Bragg serves on Senate committees focused on financial technology, economics, and financial services. He led the effort to create a year-long inquiry into Australia's financial technology sector then chaired the resulting committee. Bragg formed a 15-person advisory committee of legal and business experts to advise the Australian government on policies that could increase the country's competitiveness with countries like China in the financial technology sector. Bragg led a motion requiring the Australian Broadcasting Corporation (ABC) disclose information about its content-sharing agreement with The New Daily. After ABC cancelled the contract with The New Daily, Bragg wrote an op-ed supporting the move in The Daily Telegraph that said The New Daily was the propaganda arm of the superannuation industry. After Bragg refused to retract the statement, The New Daily threatened a defamation lawsuit.

=== 47th Parliament ===
Bragg was a prominent supporter of the 'Yes' campaign during the 2023 Australian Indigenous Voice referendum, distinguishing himself within the Coalition. He asserted that the Voice would serve as an extension of parliamentary supremacy rather than a compromise to it. As a member of the Joint Standing Committee on the Constitution Alteration Bill, he emphasized the fairness of allowing Indigenous Australians direct input into laws specifically affecting them. Despite his support, Bragg criticised Prime Minister Albanese's campaign management and ultimately called for a delay to the referendum.

In August 2022, Bragg became chair of the Senate Economics References Committee. He led significant inquiries including:

- ASIC Investigation and Enforcement: The inquiry, initiated in October 2022, examined ASIC's capacity and capability to undertake proportionate investigation and enforcement action. The final report, released in July 2024, criticized ASIC questioning the regulators capacity to effectively regulate corporate misconduct. The Inquiry recommended splitting ASIC into two separate bodies due to its comprehensive failure in executing its role.
- Residential Electrification: Commencing in June 2023, this inquiry explored the potential of residential electrification to improve household energy efficiency and reduce emissions. The final report, released in April 2025, recognised the increasing importance of household electrification for Australians.
- Financial Regulatory Framework and Home Ownership: Launched in August 2024, this inquiry examined Australia's financial regulatory framework and its impact on home ownership. The final report was tabled in November 2024 and called for reforms to Australia's financial regulatory framework and called for the mandate of the Australian Prudential Regulation Authority to be updated to lower the serviceability buffer for first home buyers.

In March 2023, Bragg introduced the Digital Assets (Market Regulation) Bill 2023, a private senator's bill aiming to regulate cryptocurrency and other digital assets. The bill sought to expedite crypto regulation in Australia.

In March 2024, Bragg was appointed Shadow Assistant Minister for Home Ownership. In this role, he advocated for policies allowing Australians to use their superannuation for housing deposits. Furthermore, Bragg has called for reforms to Australia's lending laws to make it easier for first home buyers to secure mortgages. He believes current settings are restrictive and contributing to the housing crisis. He has called home ownership one of the biggest issues facing Australia.

He was also critical of the Albanese government's decision to try and legislate a new superannuation tax on unrealised capital gains.

=== 48th Parliament ===
Bragg was re-elected to the Senate for a second term in 2025, securing the top position on the NSW Coalition Senate ticket. In May 2025, Bragg was appointed as Shadow Minister for Housing and Homelessness and Shadow Minister for Deregulation and Productivity, by Opposition Leader, Sussan Ley.

=== Views ===
Bragg is a member of the Moderate faction of the Liberal Party.

Bragg is a vocal critic of industry superannuation funds, which invest mandatory retirement contributions from workers. When Bragg worked for the Business Council of Australia, he lobbied to require the funds use independent directors. In Bragg's first speech after being elected to the Senate, Bragg discussed why he opposed mandatory retirement payments. Bragg also advocates for mandatory disclosures from industry superannuation funds on how retirement funds are being managed and how much money is given to trade unions.

Bragg supports the Uluru Statement from the Heart, which would require the legislature to consult a network of representatives of Indigenous Australians before passing legislation affecting Indigenous Australians. He lobbied other politicians to support the legislation as well. He also supported having the Australian government purchase the copyrights to the Aboriginal flag, so constituents could use the flag without worrying about copyright infringement. Bragg supports the creation of a dedicated precinct for burying the remains of Indigenous Australians that would be called the National Resting Place or "Ngurra Precinct."

Bragg urged the Australian parliament to pass regulations for cryptocurrency in an effort to encourage cryptocurrency companies to start in Australia. He also advocated for big tech companies like Facebook and Google to make a proportional number of content deals with smaller publishers as they do with larger ones. He participated in negotiations between Facebook and smaller news organizations to broker content agreements with a more diverse range of publishers. Bragg was also an important figure in the "Consumer Data Right" privacy legislation.

Bragg led the Liberal Party's campaign to support same sex marriage, criticised anti-Asian comments during the COVID-19 pandemic, and advocated for carbon-neutral policies. On 9 November 2025, Bragg said he would resign from the Ley shadow ministry if the Liberal Party dropped its commitment to net zero and withdrew from the Paris Agreement.

== Author ==
Bragg contributes to The Australian Financial Review, The Daily Telegraph and The Australian and appears on the ABC and Sky News. He is the author of Fit for Service (2017), the essay "Scrap Iron for Japan" in Paul Ritchie's Forgotten People Updated (2018), and Bad Egg: How to Fix Super (2020). Bragg also published a book called Buraadja: The Liberal Case for National Reconciliation, a three-part series focused on the history of the rights of Indigenous Australians.

== Personal life ==
Bragg was married to Melanie Evans, CEO of ING Australia. They separated in September 2022. Since December 2022, he has been in a relationship with former Liberal MP Fiona Martin.

In March 2020, Bragg tested positive for COVID-19 as part of a cluster of cases associated with a wedding.

Bragg is a Grand Commander in the Greek Orthodox Archdiocese of Australia's Order of Christ-loving. He was awarded the honour by Archbishop Makarios after assisting the archbishop to obtain Australian permanent residency. He is reportedly "the first non-Greek and non-Orthodox person to receive the highest honour that the Greek Orthodox Church in Australia can bestow".
