= Minister for Youth (Australia) =

Australian ministerial position

- Commonwealth Coat of Arms

- Flag of Australia

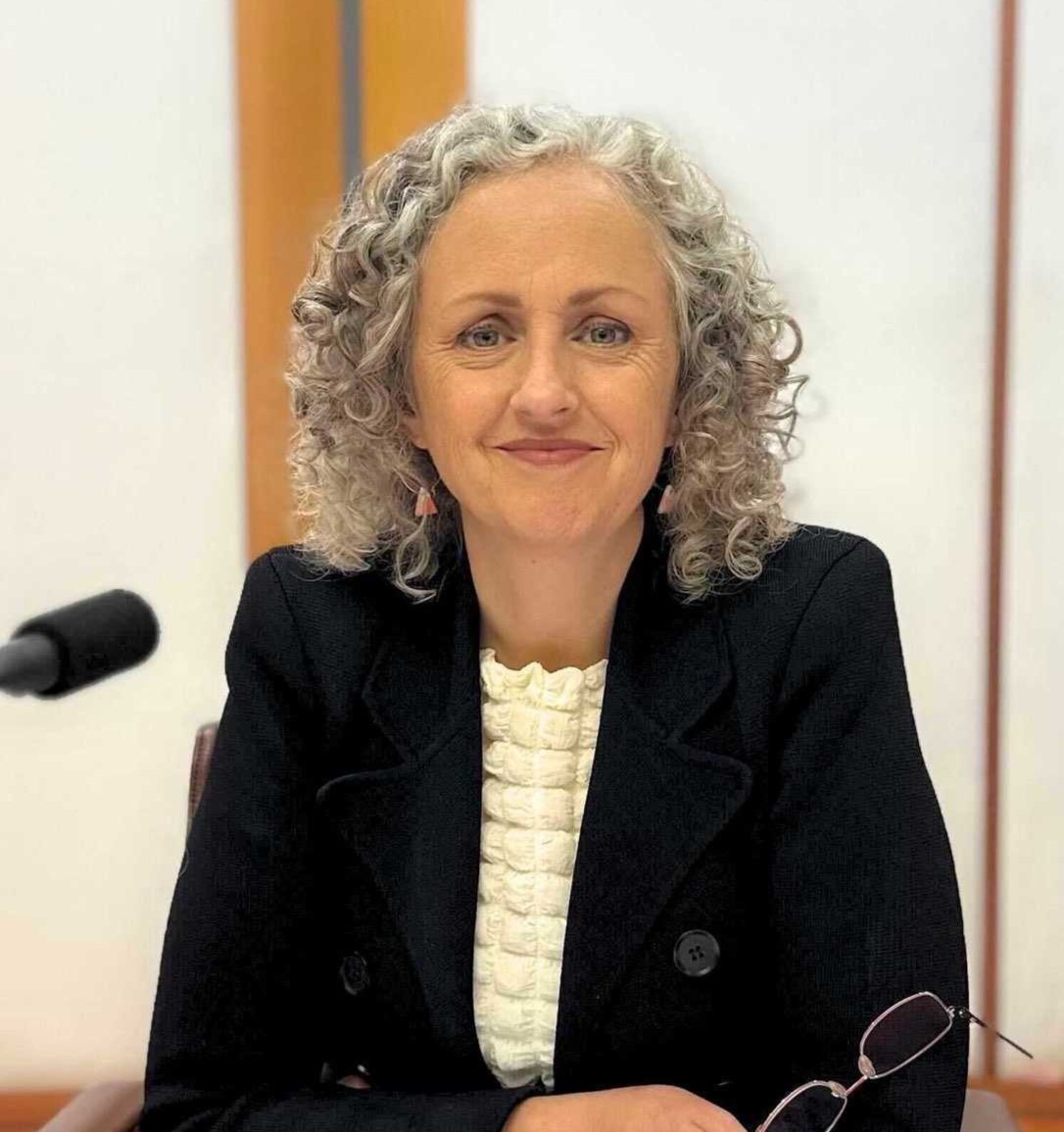
- Incumbent; Jess Walsh since 13 May 2025
- Department of Education
- Style: The Honourable
- Appointer: Governor-General on the advice the prime minister
- Inaugural holder: Ian Viner (as Minister for Employment and Youth Affairs)
- Formation: 5 December 1978
- Website: ministers.education.gov.au/senator-hon-dr-jess-walsh

The Minister for Youth is the minister in the Australian government responsible for oversight of youth affairs in Australia alongside the Minister for Education. The incumbent Minister is Labor senator Jess Walsh.

In the Government of Australia, the Minister for Education is the senior minister in providing direction and oversight of the Department of Education. The Minister for Youth assists in this administration.

== List of ministers for youth ==
There have been several portfolios to include the term "youth", sometimes separate from or under education portfolios. The following individuals have been appointed as Ministers with various titles that have included the word "youth":

Order	Minister	Party affiliation	Prime Minister	Ministerial title	Term start	Term end	Term in office
1	Ian Viner	Liberal	Fraser	Minister for Employment and Youth Affairs	5 December 1978	16 April 1981	2 years, 132 days
2	Neil Brown	Liberal	Fraser	Minister for Employment and Youth Affairs	16 April 1981	7 May 1982	1 year, 21 days
3	Susan Ryan	Labor	Hawke	Minister for Education and Youth Affairs	11 March 1983	13 December 1984	1 year, 277 days
4	John Dawkins	Labor	Hawke	Minister assisting the Prime Minister for Youth Affairs	13 December 1984	24 July 1987	2 years, 223 days
5	Clyde Holding	Labor	Hawke	Minister for Employment Services and Youth Affairs	24 July 1987	19 January 1988	179 days
6	Amanda Vanstone	Liberal	Howard	Minister for Employment, Education, Training and Youth Affairs	11 March 1996	9 October 1997	1 year, 212 days
7	David Kemp	Liberal	Howard	Minister for Employment, Education, Training and Youth Affairs	9 October 1997	21 October 1998	5 years, 260 days
7	David Kemp	Liberal	Howard	Minister for Education, Training and Youth Affairs	21 October 1998	26 November 2001	5 years, 260 days
8	Larry Anthony	National	Howard	Minister for Children and Youth Affairs	26 November 2001	26 October 2004	2 years, 335 days
9	Kate Ellis	Labor	Rudd	Minister for Youth	3 December 2007	9 June 2009	2 years, 207 days
9	Kate Ellis	Labor	Rudd	Minister for Early Childhood Education, Childcare and Youth	9 June 2009	28 June 2010	2 years, 207 days
10	Peter Garrett	Labor	Gillard	Minister for School Education, Early Childhood and Youth	28 June 2010	26 June 2013	2 years, 363 days
(9)	Kate Ellis	Labor	Rudd	Minister for Early Childhood, Childcare and Youth	1 July 2013	18 September 2013	79 days
11	Richard Colbeck	Liberal	Morrison	Minister for Youth and Sport	29 May 2019	22 December 2020	1 year, 207 days
12	Alan Tudge	Liberal	Morrison	Minister for Education and Youth	22 December 2020	2 December 2021	345 days
13	Anne Aly	Labor	Albanese	Minister for Youth	1 June 2022	13 May 2025	2 years, 346 days
14	Jess Walsh	Labor	Albanese	Minister for Youth	13 May 2025	Incumbent	1 year, 117 days

== See also ==
- Minister for Education and Early Learning (New South Wales)
- Minister for Youth (New South Wales)
- Minister for Youth (Victoria)
- Minister for Youth (Western Australia)
