= James McGrath (Australian politician) =

Australian politician (born 1974)

Senator the Honourable James McGrath
- James McGrath in 2025

Senator for Queensland
- Incumbent
- Assumed office 1 July 2014
- Preceded by: Sue Boyce

Assistant Minister to the Prime Minister
- In office 21 September 2015 – 22 August 2018
- Prime Minister: Malcolm Turnbull
- Preceded by: Josh Frydenberg; Alan Tudge
- Succeeded by: Steve Irons

Personal details
- Born: 14 May 1974 (age 52) Toowoomba, Queensland, Australia
- Party: Liberal
- Other political affiliations: Liberal National Party of Queensland
- Education: Griffith University (BCom, LLB); Queensland University of Technology (LLM)

James Anthony McGrath (born 14 May 1974) is an Australian politician who has been a senator for Queensland since 2014. He is a member of the Liberal National Party of Queensland (LNP) and sits with the Liberal Party in federal parliament. Following his re-election in 2022, McGrath was appointed as Shadow Assistant Minister for Finance and Shadow Assistant Minister to the Leader of the Opposition.

== Early life ==
McGrath was born in Toowoomba, Queensland, Australia. He attended Toowoomba State High School and Nambour State High School, the latter known for its alma mater of notable politicians such as Kevin Rudd and Wayne Swan. He graduated from Griffith University, where he was President of the Griffith University Liberal Club, with a Bachelor of Commerce and Bachelor of Laws. He then completed a Master of Laws at the Queensland University of Technology. He was admitted as a solicitor and worked as an articled clerk in a legal firm before working with the Queensland Parliamentary Ombudsman between 1999 and 2001.

McGrath is a former political strategist who worked with Lynton Crosby on Boris Johnson's successful 2008 London mayoral campaign and on the Maldivian Democratic Party's 2008 presidential election victory. He was sacked from the post after a "damaging race row".

== Political career ==
Between 2009 and 2010, McGrath served as the deputy federal director of the Liberal Party of Australia. He was campaign director for the Liberal National Party and the Country Liberal Party between 2010 and 2012, during which the LNP recorded the largest ever electoral victory in the state of Queensland.

=== Senate ===
McGrath was elected to the Senate at the 2013 federal election. In 2014, his first speech consisted of calling for the Goods and Services Tax (GST) rate to rise to 15 percent, the abolition of federal education and healthcare, youth radio station Triple J and Australian Broadcasting Corporation to be privatised, and defending people's right to say "hurtful and bigoted and stupid and dumb things".

McGrath assisted in toppling both Tony Abbott and Malcolm Turnbull as Liberal Party leaders. The night before Turnbull defeated Abbott for the leadership, McGrath joined a dinner with a close group of Turnbull number crunchers. McGrath was labelled by some as Turnbull's 'key numbers man'. During the Channel 7 election coverage, Australian radio broadcaster Alan Jones engaged McGrath in a heated debate. Jones accused McGrath of being "too panicked" and taking the LNP down the path of Labor by supporting Turnbull. Jones told McGrath, "There are a lot of bed-wetters in the Liberal Party and you seem to be the captain of the bed-wetters."

Under Turnbull, McGrath was promoted to Assistant Minister to the Prime Minister. He served in this role from September 2015 to August 2018, and acted as Assistant Minister to the Minister for Immigration and Border Protection from February to July 2016.

After having supported Malcolm Turnbull in the 2015 leadership spill, McGrath swung his support behind fellow Queensland parliamentarian Peter Dutton against Turnbull in 2018. Consequently, he resigned from his executive position on 22 August 2018. McGrath was not promoted back into the outer ministry after his rebellion against Turnbull.

In May 2021, McGrath was preselected to lead the LNP Senate ticket for the 2022 federal election, defeating a challenge from Amanda Stoker for the number one position on the ticket. McGrath was reported to have had the support of senior Queensland cabinet ministers Peter Dutton and David Littleproud, and his 212–101 victory was seen as a rebuke of the LNP's insurgent 'Christian Right' factional grouping.

On the night of the May 2025 federal election, McGrath gained public attention for repeatedly claiming that the election results would not be known until all of the pre-poll voting was counted. Subsequently, the sarcastic phrase "wait for the pre-polls" was popularised by multiple satirical news outlets in reference to McGrath's comments.

=== Controversies ===
In 2008, McGrath resigned from Boris Johnson's mayoral administration for allegedly racist comments. McGrath was asked if the election of Johnson as mayor might trigger a 'mass exodus of older Caribbean migrants' and replied that 'let them go if they don't like it here'.

In 2011, McGrath was revealed to have paid a disgruntled Labor staffer for dirt files on government MPs. McGrath orchestrated the research through disgruntled Labor staffer Robert Hough. A sum of $3,075 was given to Hough to research the files. The sheet, organised by McGrath, included information on politicians sex lives, sexual promiscuity, drinking habits, health matters and family breakdowns. The sheet even included details of the schools of government MP children. Though McGrath was reprimanded for his actions by LNP leader Campbell Newman, ALP deputy leader Andrew Fraser called for him to be sacked for his involvement in commissioning the research.

In July 2018, McGrath was photographed alongside a group of Young LNP members with some making the "OK" hand gesture which has been come to be seen as a white supremacist symbol.

In October 2019, McGrath attracted criticism after posting a photograph on Facebook showing a dead cockatoo caught in the roof rack of his car, accompanied by the caption, "Car 1. Flock of cockatoos 0." Social media users accused him of displaying a lack of compassion towards native wildlife, while Wildlife Rescue Sunshine Coast described the post as "bad form" and inappropriate.

In May 2025, several complaints were made to the ABC Ombudsman's Office about remarks McGrath made about the Australian Greens during an appearance on the ABC's Australia Decides: Election Night Live program. In the program McGrath called the Greens "a nasty, horrible, racist, antisemitic party" and said he would prefer "union thugs" to the Greens. A report by the Ombudsman ultimately found the remarks did not breach the ABC's editorial standards and no further action was pursued.

== Views ==
McGrath was a member of the Centre-Right faction of the Liberal Party during the Morrison government years, however, he became factionally unaligned after the 2022 Australian federal election.

In his maiden speech to the Senate, McGrath called for the abolition of the Department of Education and Department of Health, and for the goods and services tax to be raised to 15%. He expressed his support for individual liberty, the free market, low taxes, and small government.

McGrath described himself as a "Ronald Reagan Republican and a George Bush Republican". He supports Ukraine in the Russia-Ukraine War.

Parliament of Australia
Preceded by Sue Boyce	Senator for Queensland; 2014–present	Incumbent
Political offices
Preceded by Josh Frydenberg as Parliamentary Secretary	Assistant Minister to the Prime Minister; 2015–2018	Succeeded by Steve Irons
Preceded by Alan Tudge as Parliamentary Secretary	Assistant Minister to the Prime Minister; 2015–2018	Succeeded by Steve Irons
New ministerial post	Assistant Minister for Immigration and Border Protection; 2016	Succeeded by Alex Hawke
