= 2018 Liberal Party of Australia leadership spills =

Leader selection contests within Australia's then governing party

- Date: 21–24 August 2018
- Location: Parliament House, Canberra, Australian Capital Territory
- Cause: Conflict between Moderate and Conservative factions of the governing Liberal Party of Australia.
- Participants: Liberal Party members of the House of Representatives and of the Senate.
- Outcome: Scott Morrison succeeds Malcolm Turnbull as Leader of the Liberal Party and as Prime Minister. Josh Frydenberg succeeds Julie Bishop as Deputy Leader of the Liberal Party.

Leadership spills of the federal parliamentary leadership of the Liberal Party of Australia were held on 21 and 24 August 2018 and were called by the incumbent leader of the party, Prime Minister Malcolm Turnbull. It was nicknamed "spill week" in the media.

Turnbull called the first spill in a regularly scheduled party room meeting of the Liberal Party on 21 August, amid media reports that Minister for Home Affairs Peter Dutton was considering a challenge. Dutton submitted himself as a candidate for the leadership, but was defeated by Turnbull, who won the ballot 48 votes to 35. Dutton then immediately resigned from the ministry.

Dutton requested a second spill motion two days later. Turnbull refused to call the spill without first receiving a list of signatures representing the majority of his party room, and referred Dutton to the Attorney General's office to test his eligibility to sit in Parliament. He declared that if Dutton had the numbers to carry a spill motion, he would take it as a vote of no confidence and not stand to contest the leadership. Dutton secured the numbers for a spill and Turnbull did not re-contest the leadership, opening the way for supporters Scott Morrison and Julie Bishop to stand against Dutton.

Dutton, Treasurer Morrison and Foreign Minister Bishop contested the ballot. Bishop was eliminated in the first round of voting, and in the second round Morrison defeated Dutton by 45 votes to 40, thereby becoming the leader of the Liberal Party and Prime Minister of Australia. A ballot for the deputy leadership of the party also occurred and was won by Josh Frydenberg, who was subsequently appointed Treasurer in the Morrison government.

== Background ==
The Liberal-National Coalition won office under the leadership of Tony Abbott in the 2013 Australian federal election. The Abbott government was brought down by an internal party room challenge, launched by Malcolm Turnbull in September 2015, in which Turnbull won 54 votes of the Liberal Party room to 44 and the Turnbull government became the executive government of Australia.

Turnbull cited Newspoll results and "economic leadership" as reasons for mounting his challenge against Abbott. Under the slogan "jobs and growth," Turnbull led the Coalition to the 2016 election in which their majority in the House of Representatives was reduced to one seat.

Turnbull's ousting of Abbott had divided the Liberal Party rank and file and tensions continued in the parliamentary Party. The Government reached the 30-consecutive-Newspoll-losses benchmark Turnbull had used to unseat Abbott, in April 2018. The government suffered by-election losses in July 2018. Dissent from conservative MPs over issues such as energy prices and immigration levels grew during Turnbull's final months. On 21 August, Turnbull announced a leadership spill ahead of his 39th consecutive Newspoll loss.

Leadership spills have become a common feature of Australian federal politics in the twenty-first century (particularly in the 2010s and the late 2000s). As of 2025, only Liberal Prime Ministers John Howard and Scott Morrison, and Labor Prime Minister Anthony Albanese have served full terms since the 1983 election, with their terms ending in 2007, 2022 and continuing respectively.

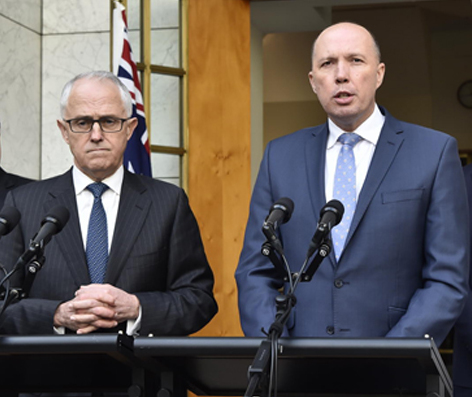
Turnbull (left) and Dutton announcing the creation of the new Home Affairs portfolio in July 2017

Turnbull had been a Minister in the Howard government and first led the Coalition in Opposition upon challenging his predecessor Brendan Nelson for the role of Opposition Leader in a 2008 spill. After extended poor Newspoll results against the Rudd government, he lost the leadership in the wake of the Utegate affair and a Party dispute over climate policy.

Tony Abbott defeated Turnbull for the Leadership in a 2009 spill, and led the party to a narrow loss in the 2010 election and to government in the 2013 election. Abbott included Turnbull in his Cabinet, from where Turnbull launched his leadership challenge in September 2015, becoming the first Liberal since William McMahon to assume the Prime Minister-ship by challenging an incumbent.

As of January 2018, voters were split in polls for preferred leader of the Liberal party between Malcolm Turnbull and Julie Bishop. Scott Morrison and Peter Dutton each had around 5% support. In April 2018, Dutton outlined his desire to lead the Liberal party in the future, and Morrison also revealed prime ministerial ambitions.

Peter Dutton had been a Minister during the Howard government in 2004 and to the Cabinet in the Abbott government in 2013

Given the poor performance by the Liberal National Party of Queensland (the Queensland branch of the Liberal Party) in the Longman by-election on 28 July 2018, Dutton, who holds the neighboring seat of Dickson, was viewed as a leader who could strengthen support for the Coalition in regional Queensland.

Dutton had also been seen as a leading figure among the conservative wing of the Liberal Party, which had clashed with Turnbull and his more moderate supporters over the National Energy Guarantee (NEG), particularly with targets to reduce carbon emissions in compliance with the Paris Agreement, among other issues in mid-2018. Conservative supporters of Dutton included Tony Abbott, who was ousted by Turnbull as party leader and prime minister in September 2015. In the days prior to the leadership spills, Turnbull was forced to make concessions on the NEG in an attempt to satisfy the more conservative members of his party, most notably abandoning the emissions reduction targets, despite the possibility of winning votes for the NEG from Labor. Tony Abbott characterized Turnbull's concessions on the NEG as a "conversion of convenience".

On 19 August 2018, Dutton declared that he supported Malcolm Turnbull and the policies of the government. However, support had been growing for a conservative Liberal Party member, often Dutton specifically, to challenge Turnbull since 2017, especially when Turnbull performed poorly against the Labor Party in opinion polls. In the weeks leading up to the poll, Dutton made contradictory remarks regarding his intentions. He refused to rule out his interest in becoming prime minister during a Hack interview, and claimed that he would resign from cabinet if he ever found himself unable to agree with a government policy during a 2GB interview. The day before this, The Daily Telegraph had published an exclusive story stating that Dutton would challenge for the prime minister-ship.

A poll commissioned by GetUp! on the Monday prior to the spill found that nearly half the Australian electorate would be less likely to vote for the Coalition if Dutton became prime minister. On the same day, Network Ten reported that Dutton might be ineligible under Section 44 of the Australian constitution, due to an "indirect pecuniary interest", similar to Bob Day's case. That evening, Luke Howarth told Craig Laundy that he planned to ask Turnbull to step down from the leadership the following day.

In the hours leading up to the spill itself, newspapers reported speculation that Greg Hunt might challenge Julie Bishop for the Deputy Leadership of the Liberal Party in the event that Dutton won the vote. However, due to Dutton failing to gain the support of the party, Bishop was the sole contender for the Deputy Leadership.

== First spill (21 August) ==
First 2018 Liberal Party of Australia leadership spill
- 21 August 2018
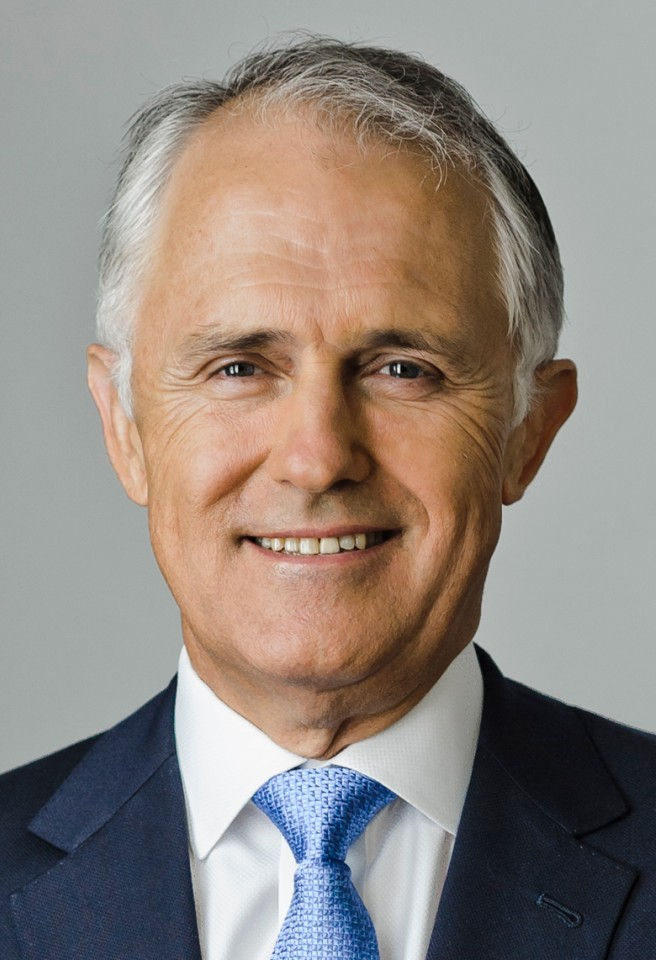

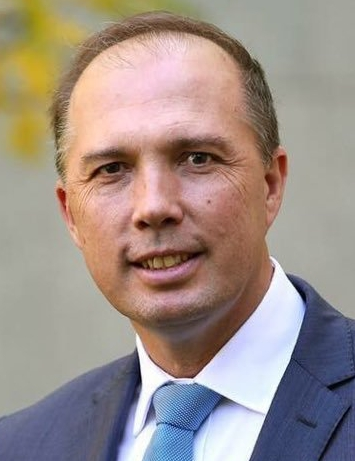
Candidate	Malcolm Turnbull	Peter Dutton
Caucus vote	48	35
Percentage	57.8%	42.2%
Seat	Wentworth (NSW)	Dickson (Qld.)
Faction	Moderate	Conservative
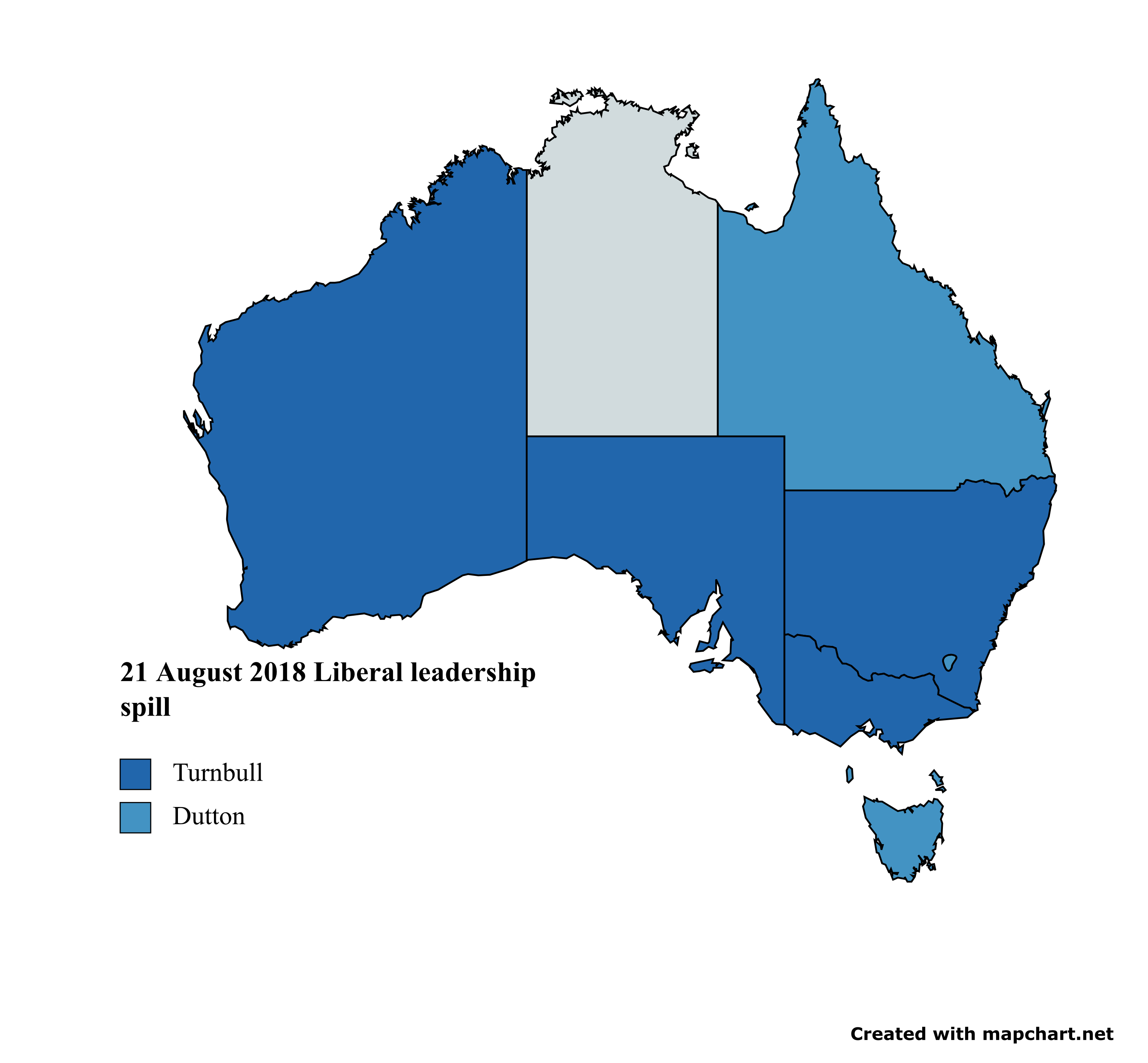
- Results by state
Leader before election
Malcolm Turnbull
Elected Leader
Malcolm Turnbull

A regularly scheduled Liberal party room meeting was held at 9:00 am AEST on 21 August. Shortly after it began, Turnbull declared the party leadership vacant, forcing a leadership spill be held, likely acknowledging the speculation that Dutton had intended to challenge Turnbull for the leadership. Dutton nominated for the ballot. The position of deputy party leader, held by Julie Bishop, was also declared vacant.

Shortly after the secret ballot, party whip Nola Marino announced that Turnbull had won the challenge, with 48 members of the federal Liberal Party caucus voting for him, while 35 voted for Dutton. Bishop retained her role as deputy leader unopposed. Senator Arthur Sinodinos was absent for the vote due to illness.

Jonathon Duniam refused to announce who he voted for, and conflicting media reports attributed him as voting for either Turnbull (Fairfax) or Dutton (News Corp). There were also conflicting reports on Ian Goodenough's vote. News Corp included Duniam and Goodenough as voters for Dutton, whereas The Sydney Morning Herald's list included Sussan Ley and Craig Kelly as Dutton voters. Kelly confirmed that he had voted for Dutton.

Reported supporters
		Turnbull (48)	Dutton (35)	Uncertain
Frontbenchers	NSW	Malcolm Turnbull, Scott Morrison, Marise Payne, Paul Fletcher, Craig Laundy, David Coleman, Alex Hawke	Concetta Fierravanti-Wells, Angus Taylor	—
Frontbenchers	VIC	Kelly O'Dwyer, Mitch Fifield, Dan Tehan, Josh Frydenberg	Greg Hunt, Alan Tudge, Michael Sukkar,	—
Frontbenchers	QLD	John McVeigh, Jane Prentice	Peter Dutton, Steven Ciobo, James McGrath, Karen Andrews	—
Frontbenchers	WA	Julie Bishop, Mathias Cormann, Christian Porter, Michaelia Cash, Ken Wyatt, Melissa Price	Michael Keenan	—
Frontbenchers	SA	Christopher Pyne, Simon Birmingham, Anne Ruston	—	—
Frontbenchers	TAS	—	—	—
Frontbenchers	ACT	—	Zed Seselja	—
Backbenchers	NSW	John Alexander, Jason Falinski, Julian Leeser, Ann Sudmalis, Lucy Wicks, Trent Zimmerman	Tony Abbott, Craig Kelly, Jim Molan	Sussan Ley
Backbenchers	VIC	Julia Banks, Russell Broadbent, Chris Crewther, Sarah Henderson, Jane Hume, Scott Ryan, Tony Smith, Tim Wilson	Kevin Andrews, James Paterson, Jason Wood	—
Backbenchers	QLD	Trevor Evans, Ian Macdonald, Stuart Robert	Scott Buchholz, Luke Howarth, Andrew Laming, Ted O'Brien, Amanda Stoker, Bert van Manen, Ross Vasta, Andrew Wallace,	—
Backbenchers	WA	Slade Brockman, Steve Irons, Nola Marino, Linda Reynolds	Andrew Hastie, Ben Morton, Dean Smith, Rick Wilson	Ian Goodenough
Backbenchers	SA	Lucy Gichuhi, Rowan Ramsey	David Fawcett, Nicolle Flint, Tony Pasin	—
Backbenchers	TAS	Richard Colbeck	Eric Abetz, David Bushby	Jonathon Duniam
Backbenchers	ACT	—	—	—

=== Aftermath ===
==== Peter Dutton ====
Despite initial conflicting reports over whether he would retain a cabinet position, Dutton resigned from his role as Minister for Home Affairs and became a backbencher. Treasurer Scott Morrison was later announced as the acting Home Affairs Minister.

On 22 August, Dutton spent several interviews discussing his policies if he were to be elected leader of the Coalition, including scrapping the GST on electricity, which Scott Morrison described as "an absolute budget blower". Dutton also floated the idea of having a royal commission into electricity companies.

Doubts surrounding Dutton's eligibility to be elected to parliament continued to be discussed, on the grounds of section 44(v) of the Australian Constitution. The section prohibits those with a pecuniary interest in an agreement with the Commonwealth from running for office. The family trust of which Dutton is a beneficiary-operated child care centre that received over $5.6 million in funding from the Commonwealth Government. A similar scenario with a Commonwealth-funded building company saw Senator Bob Day effectively disqualified by the High Court in 2017. Although Dutton had received legal advice stating that he was not in breach of the constitution, Attorney-General Christian Porter referred the matter to the Solicitor-General of Australia.

==== Malcolm Turnbull ====
Although Turnbull won the leadership ballot, the revelation that 35 of his party colleagues did not support his leadership was widely regarded as cause for concern, especially since Turnbull had been governing with a narrow one-seat parliamentary majority since the 2016 election, and given his predecessor Tony Abbott also won a spill motion before ultimately losing another leadership spill to Turnbull himself.

Following the party room meeting, several government ministers reaffirmed their support for Turnbull, including Veterans' Affairs Minister Darren Chester. Chester and fellow Nationals MP Kevin Hogan stated that if Dutton became prime minister, they would leave the Coalition and join the crossbench, which would rid a Dutton government of its narrow parliamentary majority.

After the first spill, there was a suggestion that Turnbull could call the next Australian federal election to stop a further leadership challenge, but this was discounted by Australian Broadcasting Corporation election analyst Antony Green as "far-fetched".

==== Tony Abbott ====
Former Prime Minister Tony Abbott was criticised for his role in fostering disunity within the Liberal Party and the Coalition. National Party MP Damian Drum called on Abbott to resign, while Queensland Liberal MP Warren Entsch reportedly criticised Abbott directly at the party meeting.

==== Resignations ====
As well as Dutton, Assistant Minister to the Treasurer Michael Sukkar, Assistant Minister to the Prime Minister James McGrath, Minister for International Development and the Pacific Concetta Fierravanti-Wells, Minister for Law Enforcement and Cybersecurity Angus Taylor, Assistant Minister for Science, Jobs and Innovation Zed Seselja, Minister for Human Services Michael Keenan, Minister for Citizenship and Multicultural Affairs Alan Tudge, Minister for Health Greg Hunt, and Minister for Trade, Tourism and Investment Steven Ciobo offered their resignations in response to Turnbull retaining the leadership. At first, only Dutton's resignation was accepted. By 23 August, the resignations of Fierravanti-Wells, McGrath, Seselja, and Sukkar had also been accepted, and those former ministers joined Dutton on the backbench.

==== Continuing business of Parliament ====
During question time on 21 August, Opposition Leader Bill Shorten moved to suspend standing orders in order to move a motion of no confidence in the House of Representatives against Turnbull. Leave was granted by the government but the no confidence motion failed with 76 votes against and 67 in favour. All Coalition MPs, the Centre Alliance's Rebekha Sharkie, and Independent Cathy McGowan voted against, while all present Labor MPs, the Australian Greens' Adam Bandt, and Independent Andrew Wilkie voted in favour.

The second stage of the Coalition's corporate tax cut package was rejected by the Senate.

Labor and the Greens failed to stop an expansion of the Cashless Welfare Card trial.

Kelly O'Dwyer cancelled a meeting of state and territory ministers for Women.

Labor attempted to move a motion to refer Peter Dutton's eligibility as an MP to the High Court, in a similar manner to referrals made during the recent parliamentary citizenship crisis in which several members of parliament resigned after discovering their dual citizenship status, violating section 44 of the Constitution of Australia. The motion failed 69 votes to 68.

On 23 August, Senate Opposition Leader Penny Wong moved a motion of no confidence in the Senate, which failed with 35 votes against and 31 in favour. All present Coalition Senators, both One Nation Senators, the Australian Conservatives' Cory Bernardi, the Liberal Democratic Party's David Leyonhjelm, the Katter's Australian Party's Fraser Anning, the Justice Party's Derryn Hinch, and Independent Tim Storer voted against, while all present Labor and Greens Senators voted in favour, and both Centre Alliance Senators abstained.

With up to 13 Ministers having resigned amidst the crisis, the government moved to adjourn the lower house of Parliament on 23 August, shortly before Question Time was scheduled to begin. The adjournment motion was controversial and vigorously opposed by Labor, whose leader Bill Shorten labelled it "the ultimate admission of surrender of a bankrupt government." The adjournment motion passed by 70 votes to 68.

Simon Birmingham acted as the Leader of the Government in the Senate for Question time on 23 August. He, Nigel Scullion, Marise Payne and Bridget McKenzie took on questions related to portfolios of multiple former ministers.

Also on 23 August, the Senate voted to investigate Peter Dutton's handling of two visa decisions relating to au pairs.

== Second spill (24 August) ==
2018 Liberal Party of Australia Leadership spill motion
- 24 August 2018

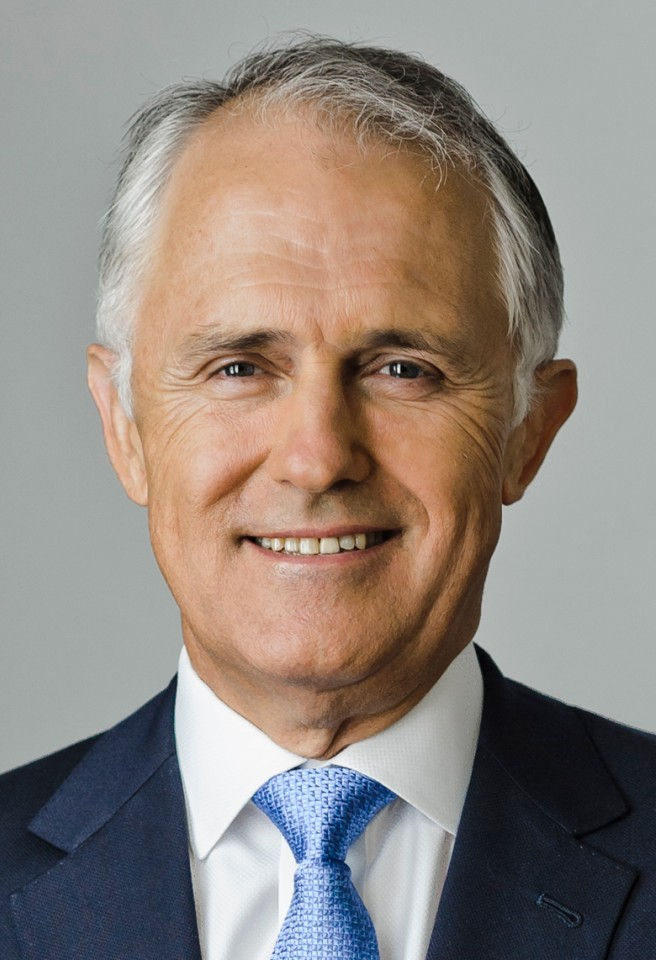
Candidate	Spill motion	Malcolm Turnbull
Caucus vote	45 (52.9%)	40 (47.1%)
Seat		Wentworth (NSW)
Faction		Moderate
Leader before election
Malcolm Turnbull
Elected Leader
Vacant

On the morning of Thursday, 23 August, Dutton challenged Turnbull's leadership a second time. Initially, Turnbull refused to call a spill, but later that morning key Turnbull supporters withdrew their support, most notably Mathias Cormann, Michaelia Cash and Mitch Fifield, who tendered their resignations and claimed that Turnbull lacked the support of the majority of the party room. Several other ministers also confirmed their resignations. At 12 noon AEST on 23 August, following the resignation of a significant portion of the front bench, the Government won a vote in the House of Representatives to adjourn Parliament, with 70 votes to 68. Parliament had been scheduled to adjourn later that day, with the next sitting day to be held on 10 September.

One hour later, Turnbull addressed the media and said that he would call a party room meeting if he sighted a petition signed by a majority of party members (i.e., 43 members) calling for a spill. Turnbull suggested that the party room meeting could be called for 12 noon the next day, on 24 August, once he had seen both the petition and an advice from the Solicitor-General on Dutton's eligibility. He said that in the event of a second spill, he would resign rather than take part in any ensuing leadership ballot, as he would consider such the petition to be a sign that he no longer had the support of the party room. The Solicitor-General's advice, released publicly a few hours before the party room meeting, found that Dutton was "not incapable" of sitting as a member of parliament, but that there is still "some risk" the High Court might find he has a conflict of interest, which could disqualify him from sitting in parliament. In relation to the request for a petition, Eric Abetz, a Dutton supporter, claimed that in the past a party room meeting could be called with only two signatures.

=== Petition ===
A petition signed by 43 Liberal Party members calling for a spill was delivered to Turnbull on Friday, 24 August. (Note: The signatories, in order of signing, were: Andrew Hastie, Tony Pasin, Sussan Ley, Craig Kelly, Michael Sukkar, Kevin Andrews, Tony Abbott, Ian Goodenough, Nicolle Flint, Peter Dutton, Amanda Stoker, Jonathon Duniam, David Bushby, James Paterson, Eric Abetz, Concetta Fierravanti-Wells, James McGrath, Jim Molan, Slade Brockman, Dean Smith, Jane Hume, Mitch Fifield, John McVeigh, David Fawcett, Mathias Cormann, Michaelia Cash, Karen Andrews, Greg Hunt, Steven Ciobo, Angus Taylor, Alan Tudge, Michael Keenan, Andrew Wallace, Scott Buchholz, Jason Wood, Ross Vasta, Luke Howarth, Rick Wilson, Ted O'Brien, Zed Seselja, Andrew Laming, Ben Morton, and Warren Entsch.) The petition was annotated by three petitioners. Among them, Karen Andrews wrote beside her name "because this has to be resolved", while Scott Buchholz wrote "I support the office of the Prime Minister" and Warren Entsch wrote "for Brendan Nelson" referring to the former Liberal leader who was defeated by Malcolm Turnbull in a leadership spill in 2008. While the second party room meeting was intended to occur at 12 noon AEST, there was a delay of twenty minutes as the signatures on the petition were verified by the party whip's office. Arthur Sinodinos, who was absent from the first spill due to illness, returned to Parliament to participate in the second spill and walked into the meeting alongside Turnbull.

=== Result ===
Second 2018 Liberal Party of Australia leadership spill
- 24 August 2018
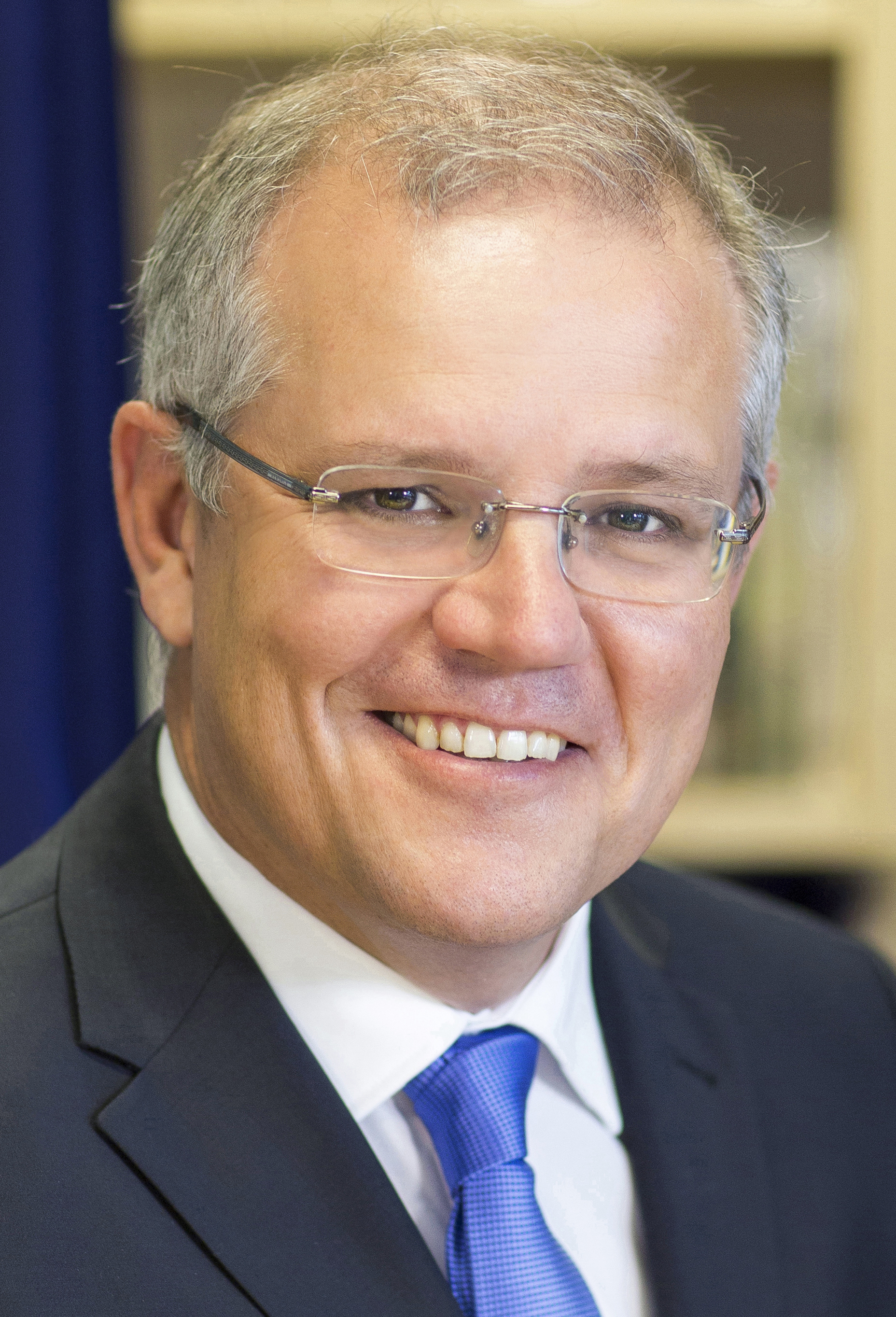

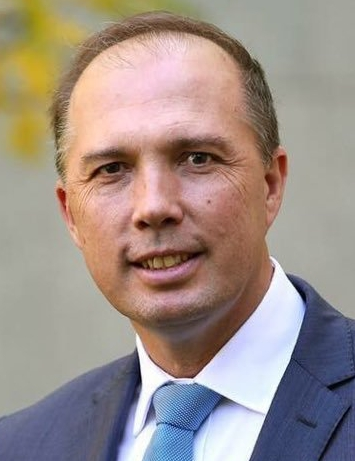

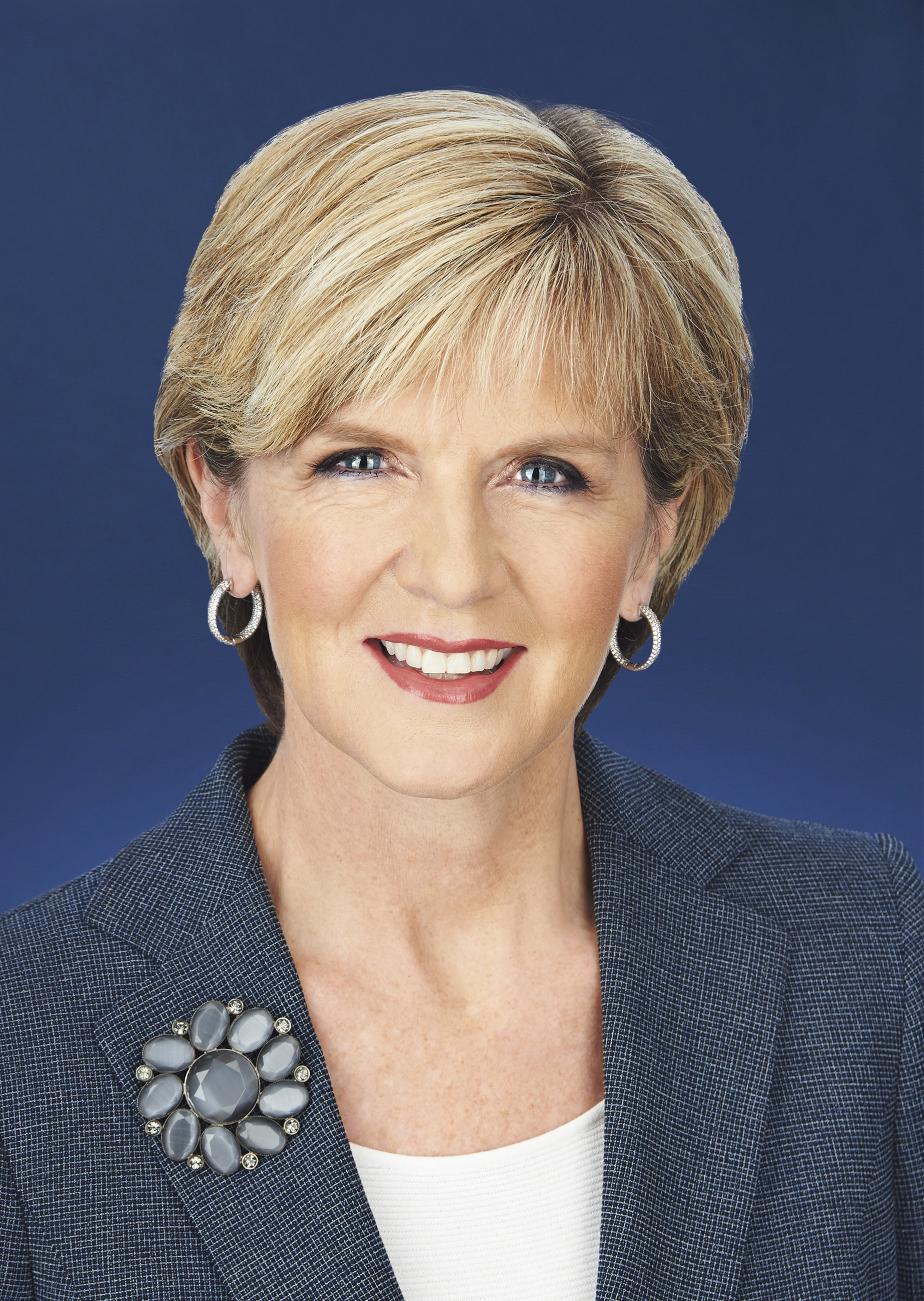
Candidate	Scott Morrison	Peter Dutton	Julie Bishop
First ballot	36 (42.4%)	38 (44.7%)	11 (12.9%)
Second ballot	45 (52.9%)	40 (47.1%)	Eliminated
Seat	Cook (NSW)	Dickson (Qld.)	Curtin (WA)
Faction	Centre-Right	Conservative	Moderate
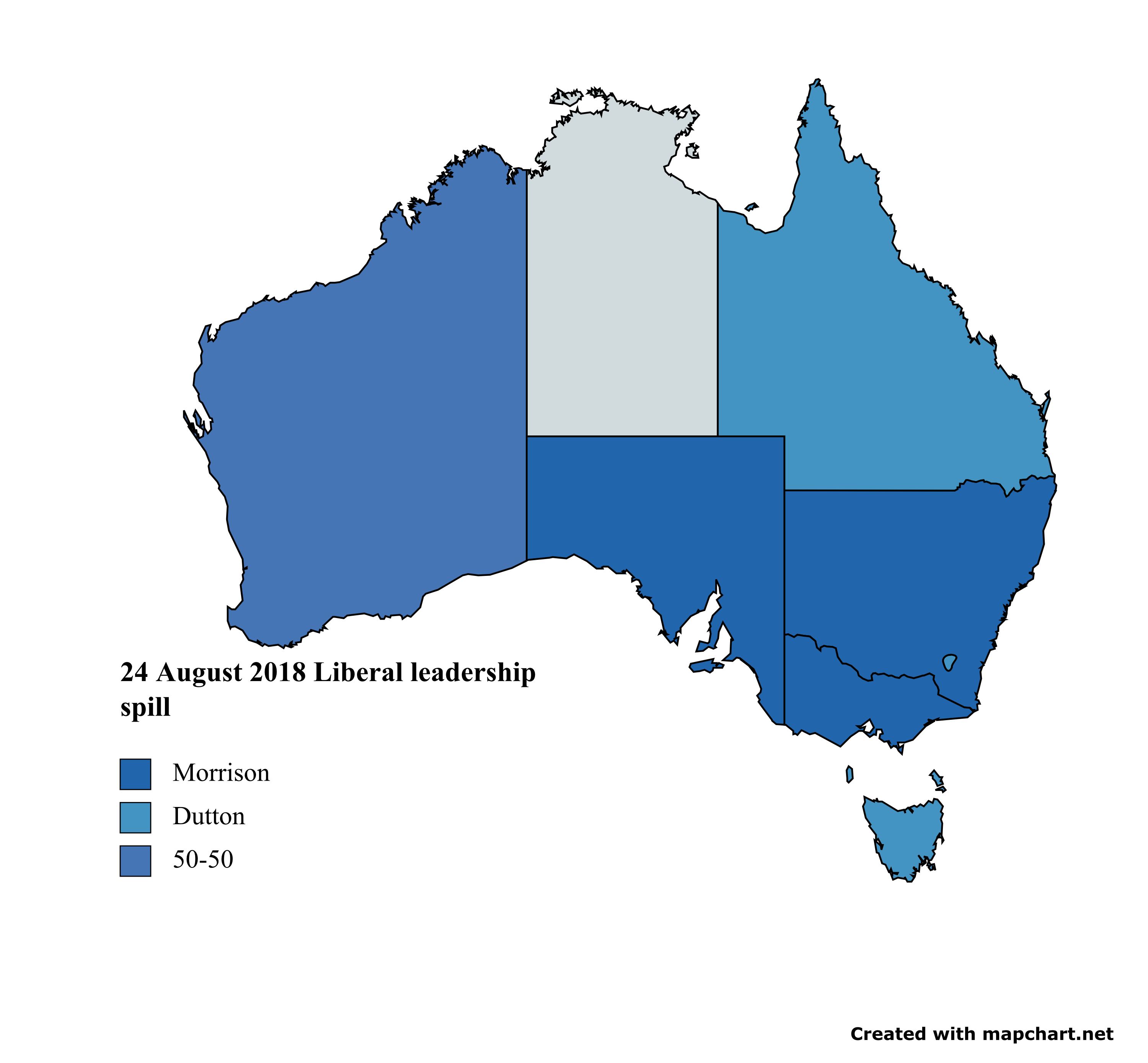
- Results by state
Leader before election
Malcolm Turnbull
Elected Leader
Scott Morrison

It was reported that Turnbull had decided not to contest the ballot, and that Scott Morrison and Julie Bishop would also be running in the challenge alongside Dutton. The West Australian ran an editorial saying that Turnbull should stand aside for Morrison. Morrison was widely seen as a compromise candidate, who was agreeable to both the moderate supporters of Turnbull and Bishop and conservatives concerned about Dutton's electability.

The initial motion to declare the leadership positions vacant, held at approximately 12:20 pm Canberra time, was successfully passed 45 votes to 40. As previously mentioned, Turnbull had indicated that he would consider a second spill motion as a vote of no confidence in his leadership, and he did not contest the subsequent leadership election.

The leadership spill was contested by Scott Morrison, Julie Bishop and Peter Dutton. Bishop with 11 votes was eliminated in the first round, while Morrison received 36 votes and Dutton 38 votes. The second round was between Dutton and Morrison and resulted in a victory for Morrison, 45 votes to 40. Morrison became party leader and subsequently prime minister. Moderate MPs were privately urged against voting for Bishop, as there was concern that Cormann had arranged for some WA-based Liberals to initially vote for her, then let Morrison's voters flow to Dutton in the second round, giving him enough support to defeat Bishop. Cormann has denied doing so.

Reported votes for Leader (second round)
	Morrison (45)	Dutton (40)	Uncertain
NSW	Scott Morrison, John Alexander, David Coleman, Jason Falinski, Paul Fletcher, Alex Hawke, Craig Laundy, Julian Leeser, Marise Payne, Arthur Sinodinos, Ann Sudmalis, Malcolm Turnbull, Lucy Wicks, Trent Zimmerman	Tony Abbott, Concetta Fierravanti-Wells, Craig Kelly, Sussan Ley, Jim Molan, Angus Taylor	—
VIC	Julia Banks, Russell Broadbent, Chris Crewther, Mitch Fifield, Josh Frydenberg, Sarah Henderson, Kelly O'Dwyer, Scott Ryan, Tony Smith, Dan Tehan, Tim Wilson	Kevin Andrews, Jane Hume, Greg Hunt, James Paterson, Michael Sukkar, Alan Tudge, Jason Wood	—
QLD	Warren Entsch, Trevor Evans, Ian Macdonald, Jane Prentice, Stuart Robert	Peter Dutton, Karen Andrews, Steven Ciobo, Luke Howarth, Andrew Laming, James McGrath, John McVeigh, Ted O'Brien, Amanda Stoker, Bert van Manen, Ross Vasta, Andrew Wallace	Scott Buchholz
WA	Julie Bishop, Slade Brockman, Steve Irons, Nola Marino, Ben Morton, Melissa Price, Linda Reynolds, Ken Wyatt	Michaelia Cash, Mathias Cormann, Ian Goodenough, Andrew Hastie, Michael Keenan, Christian Porter, Dean Smith, Rick Wilson	—
SA	Simon Birmingham, David Fawcett, Lucy Gichuhi, Christopher Pyne, Rowan Ramsey, Anne Ruston	Nicolle Flint, Tony Pasin	—
TAS	Richard Colbeck	Eric Abetz, David Bushby, Jonathon Duniam	—
ACT	—	Zed Seselja	—

==== Deputy leadership ====
2018 Liberal Party of Australia deputy leadership spill
- 24 August 2018
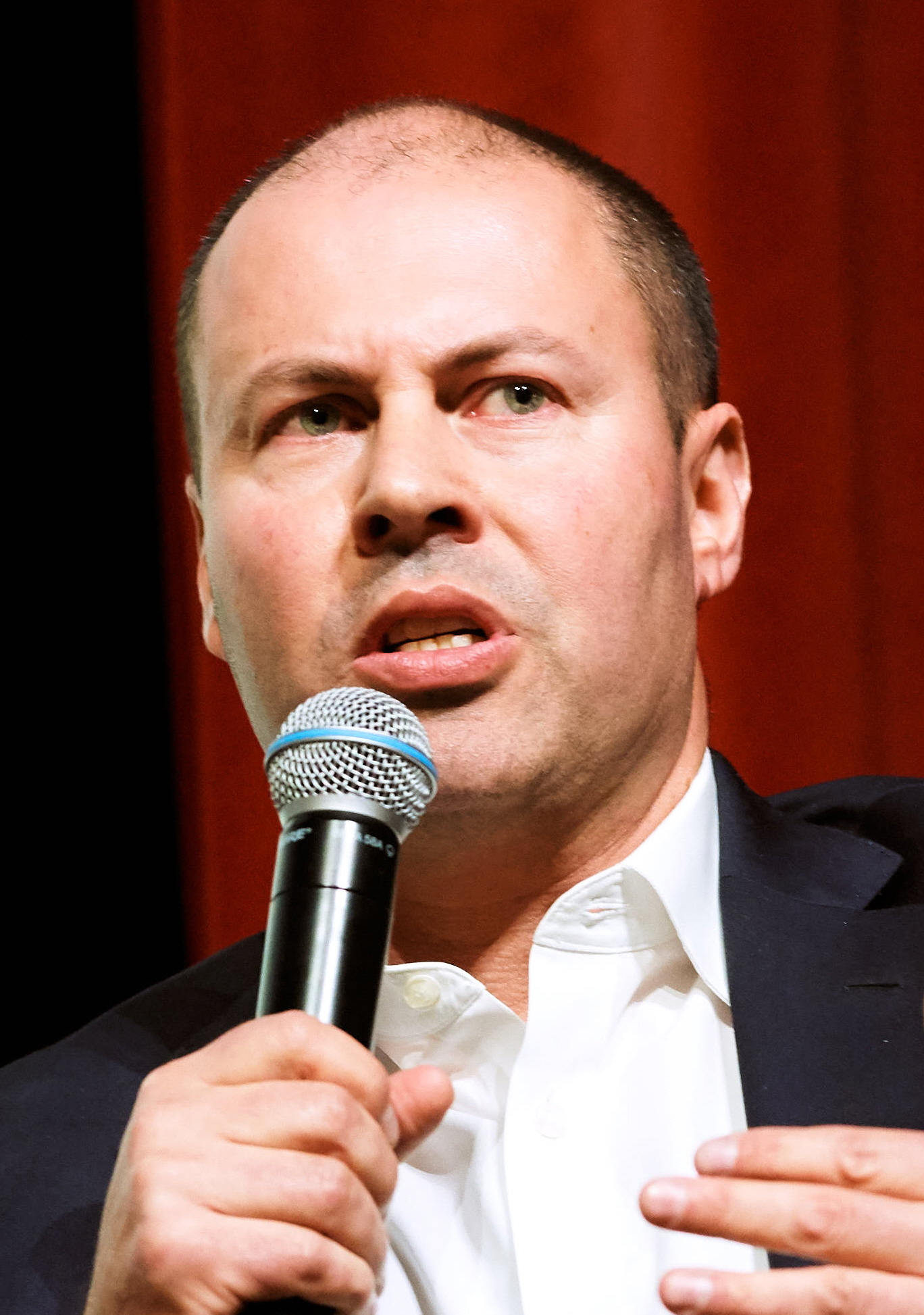

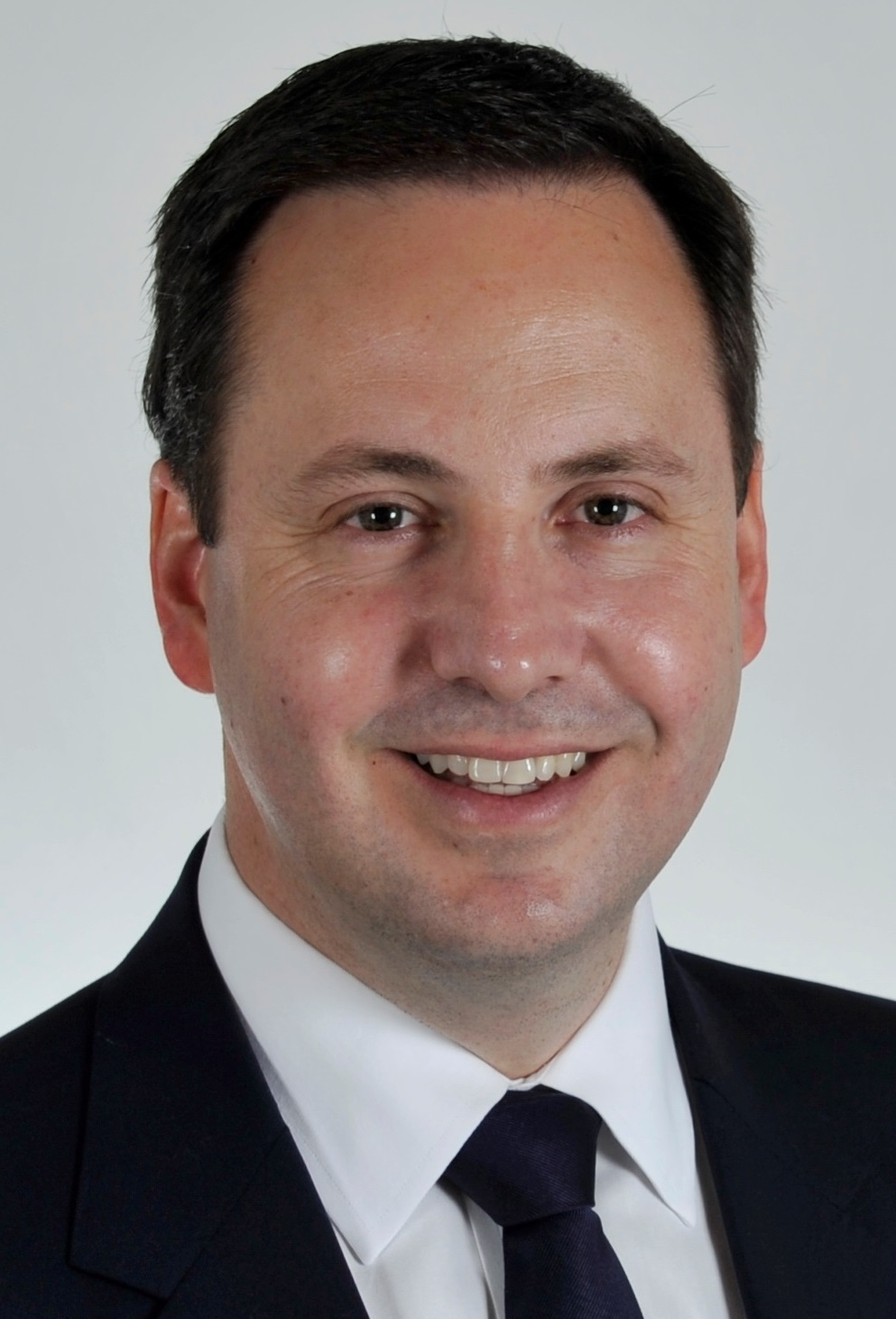

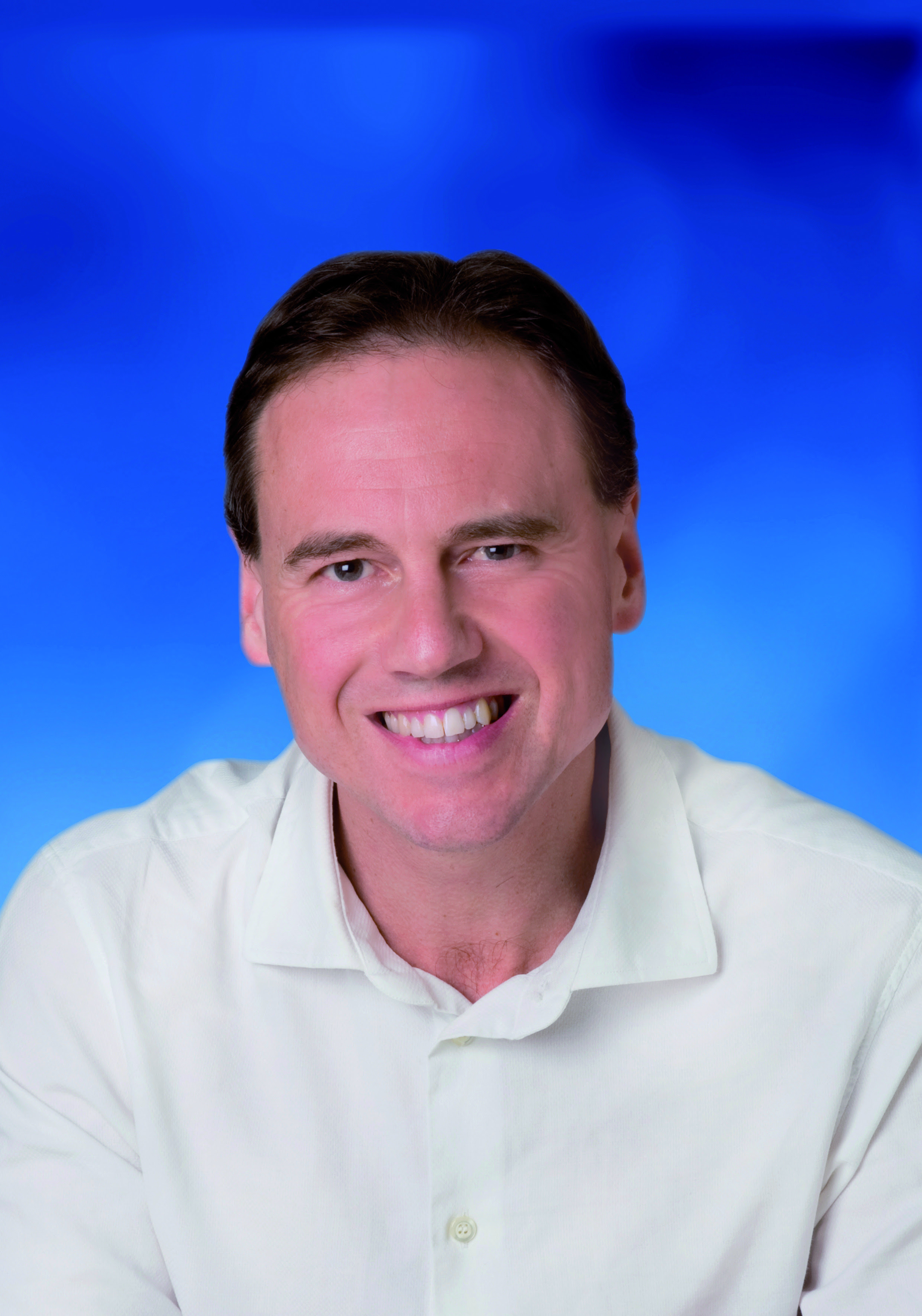
Candidate	Josh Frydenberg	Steven Ciobo	Greg Hunt
Caucus vote	46	20	16
Percentage	56.1%	24.4%	19.5%
Seat	Kooyong (Vic.)	Moncrieff (Qld.)	Flinders (Vic.)
Faction	Centre-Right		Centre-Right
Deputy Leader before election
Julie Bishop
Elected Deputy Leader
Josh Frydenberg

Bishop did not contest the deputy leadership spill, which occurred after the leadership spill. Josh Frydenberg won a majority in the first round with 46 votes, while Steven Ciobo received 20 and Greg Hunt received 16.

=== Aftermath ===
As the leader of the Liberal Party and subsequently of the Coalition, Scott Morrison was invited to form a government and was sworn in as the 30th Prime Minister of Australia, a few hours after the leadership spill. On the same day Josh Frydenberg, elected as the party's deputy leader, was sworn in as Treasurer.

On the day that the vote was announced, National MP Kevin Hogan made good on his earlier promise and moved to the crossbench. However, he maintained his National membership and continued to sit in the National party room. He also promised to support the Coalition on confidence and supply.

Turnbull confirmed his intention after his ousting as Liberal leader to resign from parliament, forcing a by-election to replace him in his Sydney seat of Wentworth. His departure meant a drop in the Coalition to 74 seats.

On 26 August, Bishop said that she would not continue as Foreign Minister under the first Morrison Ministry, and would move to the backbench for the remainder of her term. She announced her retirement from politics in February the following year, i.e. she would not re-contest her seat in the upcoming 2019 federal election.

The first Newspoll after the spill had Labor on 56 percent of the two-party vote to the Coalition's 44 percent. Bill Shorten became the preferred prime minister in the Newspoll for the first time since 2015. The subsequent Newspoll taken a fortnight later showed no improvement on the two-party preferred vote, which remained at 56-44 to Labor, following four consecutive 51-49s to Labor prior to the spill.

On 29 August Julia Banks, member for Chisholm, announced she would retire at the next election. She cited "bullying and intimidation" and the leadership spills as "the last straw" for her decision. Lucy Gichuhi threatened to name MPs who bullied during the spill, furthermore stating that she was asked during her preselection in June 2018 if she thought Turnbull was the right person to lead the Liberal party. Gichuhi was subsequently assured by Scott Morrison that the bullying would be dealt with and it was later clarified, at least publicly, that the bullying was not in direct connection to the leadership spill. Brian Loughnane and Chris McDiven, were appointed to review the Liberal party's state branches' processes for handling complaints, but there was no investigation into individual complaints.

=== Subsequent leadership spill rule changes ===
On the evening of 3 December 2018, Scott Morrison introduced a new threshold to trigger a Liberal leadership change in government, requiring two-thirds of the party room vote to trigger a spill motion. The change was introduced at an hour long evening special caucus meeting. Morrison said the changes, which were drafted with feedback from former prime ministers John Howard and Tony Abbott, would only apply to leaders who lead the party to victory at a federal election.

=== Re-evaluation ===
After the 2025 Australian federal election, the defeated federal Liberal Party sought a new parliamentary leader after Peter Dutton, who became opposition leader after the 2022 Australian federal election, lost his seat of Dickson. During this time re-elected MP for Curtin Kate Chaney said of the 2018 Liberal Party leadership spill and election: "I certainly think that when the Liberal Party knocked back [former Curtin MP] Julie Bishop and chose Scott Morrison instead, it was a sliding-doors moment for the Australian Liberal Party", "a lot of women looked at that point and thought, 'this does not look like a party that represents me'".
