= Zion Graphics =

Zion Graphics, established in 1992, is an Australian print procurement company which has managed design and printing work for various members of the Liberal Party of Australia since 2003. The company is owned by the Liberal Party's Bella Vista branch president, Rudy Limantono as the sole director of a company called Hillsview Pacific Pty Ltd.

Company clients have included NSW Corrections Minister David Elliott, Treasurer Dominic Perrottet, Western Sydney Minister Stuart Ayres, Mental Health Minister Tanya Davies, Innovations minister Matt Kean, Federal minister Paul Fletcher, Federal backbencher Julian Leeser and several Liberal MPs including: Riverstone MP Kevin Conolly, Kuringai MP Alister Henskens and Seven Hills MP Mark Taylor.

Federal minister Alex Hawke has used the company since his election in 2007. His printing expenditure became the subject of a BuzzFeed News articles in 2018.

== BuzzFeed report and defamation suit ==
Articles by Alice Workman published by BuzzFeed News estimated that Federal Minister Alex Hawke had spent over $500,000 of taxpayer funds on services with Zion Graphics; a company privately owned by a Liberal party donor and branch president. The Independent Parliamentary Expenses Authority reported that Hawke spent $298,808.32 on printing and communication from April 2017 to June 2018, but how much of that work was handled by Zion Graphics is unknown. Workman noted that Hawke's expenditure greatly exceeded those of members in neighbouring electorates, despite him holding the seat of Mitchell by a margin of 21.4%. Workman compared this with prominent MPs such as then-Treasurer Scott Morrison (who spent $179,063.10 in Cook, held by a margin of 15.7%) and Tony Abbott (who spent $184,905.91 in Warringah, held by 15.3%).

The article revealed that Federal politicians' printing expenditure must sit within their overall office expenses cap, which at the time was $136,647.23 plus $1.019 for every person enrolled to vote in their electorate. For Hawke, with an electorate of 102,410 people, that works out to be $241,003.02 every 12 months. Hawke did not exceed his cap. Politicians interviewed by the Sydney Morning Herald claimed that their printing expenditure was legitimate and denied any impropriety.

Workman reported that "a senior Liberal source familiar with the arrangement described it as 'an extreme misuse of parliamentary entitlements.'"

A defamation suit was filed against BuzzFeed and Alice Workman by Rudy Limantono, on the basis that BuzzFeed's publications made false imputations regarding the propriety of his conduct. The suit was ultimately settled out of court in 2019, with BuzzFeed issuing a formal apology in writing as well as on their website to Rudy Limantono and Zion Graphics. Later that year, BuzzFeed and Alice Workman settled two defamation suits filed by former Labor MP Emma Husar and Ben Davies, a former staffer of Liberal Senator Michaelia Cash.

Alice Workman left BuzzFeed in February 2019. BuzzFeed shut down its Australian operation in May 2020.
