= Alex Hawke =

Australian politician (born 1977)

The Honourable Alex Hawke MP
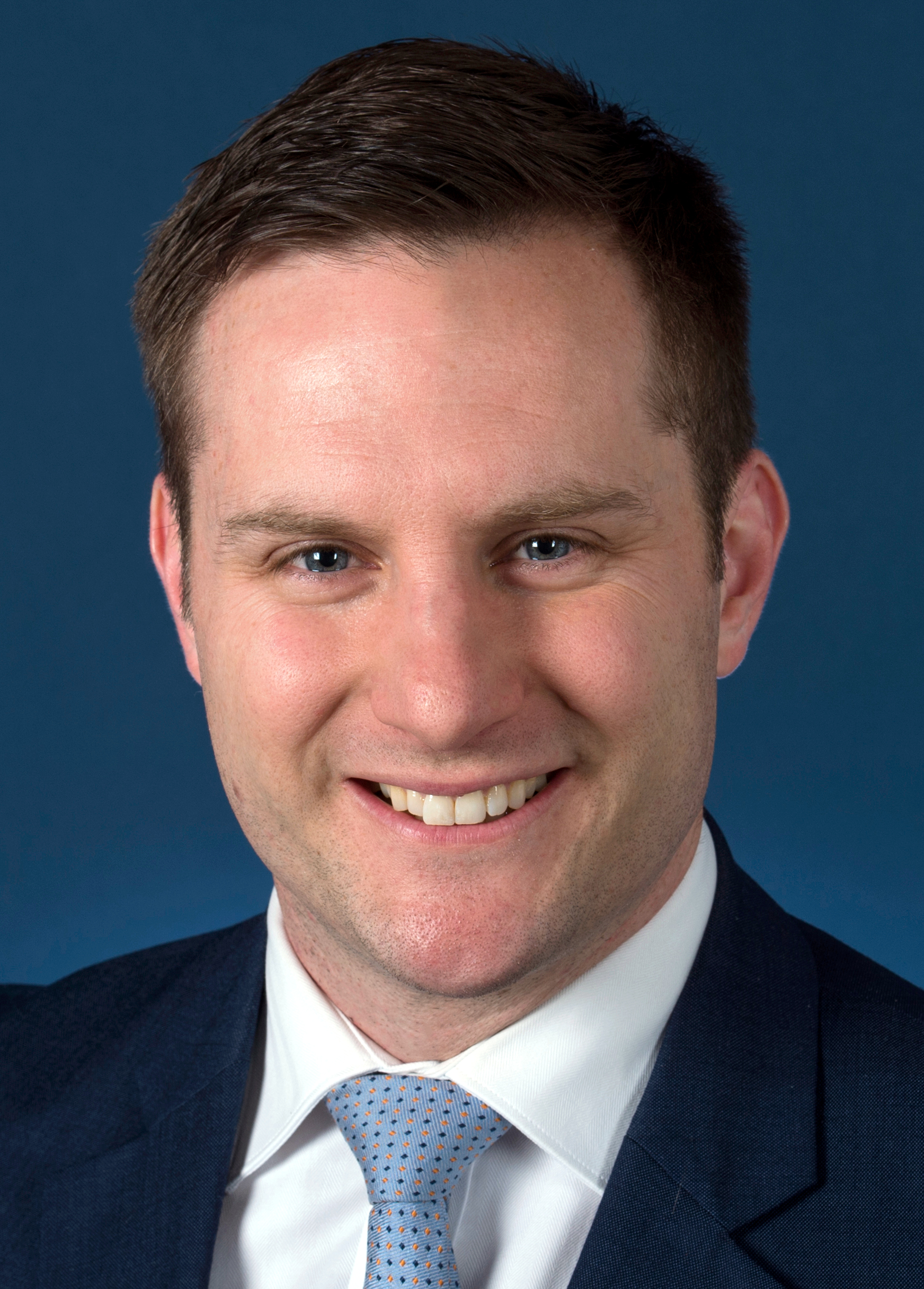
- Official portrait, 2016

Manager of Opposition Business in the House
- In office 28 May 2025 – 17 February 2026
- Deputy: Kevin Hogan
- Leader: Sussan Ley
- Preceded by: Michael Sukkar
- Succeeded by: Dan Tehan

Minister for Immigration, Citizenship, Migrant Services and Multicultural Affairs
- In office 22 December 2020 – 23 May 2022
- Prime Minister: Scott Morrison
- Preceded by: David Coleman
- Succeeded by: Andrew Giles

Minister for International Development and the Pacific
- In office 29 May 2019 – 22 December 2020
- Prime Minister: Scott Morrison
- Minister: Marise Payne
- Preceded by: Anne Ruston
- Succeeded by: Zed Seselja

Assistant Minister for Defence
- In office 29 May 2019 – 22 December 2020
- Prime Minister: Scott Morrison
- Minister: Linda Reynolds
- Preceded by: David Fawcett
- Succeeded by: Andrew Hastie

Special Minister of State
- In office 28 August 2018 – 26 May 2019
- Prime Minister: Scott Morrison
- Preceded by: Mathias Cormann
- Succeeded by: Mathias Cormann

Assistant Minister for Home Affairs
- In office 19 July 2016 – 28 August 2018
- Prime Minister: Malcolm Turnbull; Scott Morrison
- Preceded by: James McGrath
- Succeeded by: Linda Reynolds

Assistant Minister to the Treasurer
- In office 21 September 2015 – 19 July 2016
- Prime Minister: Malcolm Turnbull
- Preceded by: Kelly O'Dwyer
- Succeeded by: Michael Sukkar

Member of the Australian Parliament for Mitchell
- Incumbent
- Assumed office 24 November 2007
- Preceded by: Alan Cadman

Personal details
- Born: Alexander George Hawke; 9 July 1977 (age 49) Wollongong, New South Wales, Australia
- Party: Liberal
- Spouses: Rebecca Davie (m. 2010; div. 2013) Amelia McManus (m. 2013)
- Children: 4
- Education: University of Sydney
- Website: www.alexhawke.au

Alexander George Hawke (born 9 July 1977) is an Australian politician who served as Minister for Immigration, Citizenship, Migrant Services and Multicultural Affairs from 2020 to 2022 in the Morrison government. Hawke has served as Member of Parliament (MP) for Mitchell since 2007, representing the Liberal Party.

Hawke previously served as Minister for International Development and the Pacific and Assistant Minister for Defence from May 2019 to December 2020, and Special Minister of State from 2018 to 2019 in the Second and First Morrison Ministries respectively. Prior to these, he served as Assistant Minister for Home Affairs in the Second Turnbull Ministry from December 2017 to August 2018. Hawke was the national and state president of the Young Liberals.

== Early life ==
Hawke was born on 9 July 1977 in Wollongong, New South Wales. His mother died when he was 10 years old and he was raised by his father. His maternal grandparents migrated from Chortiatis, Greece in 1953.

Hawke attended Hills Grammar School and Cumberland High School. He then studied at the University of Sydney, graduating with a Bachelor of Arts and a Masters in Government and Public Affairs. He attended Dominic Perrottet's 21st birthday party. At university he joined the Australian Army Reserve and served for six years, commissioning into the Royal Australian Armoured Corps and serving as a lieutenant with the 1st/15th Royal New South Wales Lancers.

== Early political career ==
=== Young Liberal Movement ===
Hawke joined the Liberal Party in 1995, and was elected vice-president of the NSW Division of the Young Liberal Movement in 2001, and became president in 2002. He served on the Liberal Party NSW State Executive from 2002 to 2005, and in 2005 was elected Federal President of the Young Liberal Movement. He remains a member of the Liberal Party campaign Committee, and a Delegate to the Liberal Party State Council.

He was one of the orchestraters of the shift to the right for the young Liberals.

Hawke briefly worked part-time in the private sector while studying at university in 1998, becoming an assistant-manager for Woolworths in the Hills District. Following graduation, he has exclusively worked as a political advisor, firstly as an electorate officer to Ross Cameron MP, Member for Parramatta. In 2001, he commenced work as an adviser to the Senator Helen Coonan, then Minister for Revenue and Assistant Treasurer, advising on taxation, superannuation and insurance matters during the time of the HIH liquidation. Hawke has also worked as an adviser to David Clarke MLC and Ray Williams MP.

=== Early political views ===
Drawing attention to his political ideology, in 2005 Hawke made it known that he believed the Liberal Party to be the home of conservative values, and claimed that "Nobody joins the Liberal Party to be left-wing. If you stand for compulsory student unionism, drug-injecting rooms and lowering the [homosexual] age of consent, you can choose the Greens, Labor or the Democrats."

A few months later, Hawke attracted some significant controversy. Former NSW opposition leader John Brogden blamed Hawke for contributing to his downfall by leaking information to the media and political enemies – a claim that Hawke denied. The next day on 30 August 2005, Brogden was admitted to hospital after committing an apparent attempt at suicide in his electoral office. Brogden's claims were strongly denied by Hawke, who stated "I have not spoken to a single journalist, on or off the record, about this matter until now and I was not in attendance at the function where Brogden committed these acts. To ascribe any role to me in this embarrassing episode is false and I reject it totally".

=== Preselection ===
On 16 June 2007, Hawke gained Liberal Party preselection for the seat of Mitchell by a margin of 81 votes to 20 against David Elliott, then deputy chief of the Australian Hotels Association. Paul Blanch, a grazier from Orange, received 8 votes. Alan Cadman, who had been the member for Mitchell since 1974, chose not to contest the preselection, but was later quoted as saying that this was due to "relentless branch-stacking within the electorate." After his preselection, The Sydney Morning Herald reported Hawke's comments that he believes that Australia will move increasingly towards an American model of conservatism and that "The two greatest forces for good in human history are capitalism and Christianity, and when they're blended it's a very powerful duo." Hawke strongly rejected various reports and allegations that he is a "right-wing extremist", saying he represents the values of his electorate.

Hawke was seen as highly effective in his factional manipulations, and was called by 2GB broadcaster Alan Jones as "a cancer on the Liberal Party in NSW".

Split from the Right

In 2009 Alex Hawke and supporters left the NSW Right faction of the Liberal Party over disputes over conflicting preselection influences with NSW upper house MP David Clarke. Hawke then proceeded to go into an alliance with the NSW Moderates, ending the right's control over the party. Hawke in the following years used his balance of power position on state executive to coerce the moderates into parachuting factional allies as Liberal Candidates despite the wishes of local branch members.

== Political career ==
Hawke was elected to Parliament as Member for Mitchell on 24 November 2007. There was a swing against the Liberals of 7.9 points, but Hawke won the seat with 61.6 per cent of the vote on a two-party-preferred basis.

In his maiden speech in the House of Representatives, Hawke described his political beliefs as follows: "My brand of Liberalism is more interested in what we support than what we oppose. I want not just to resist those things that are harmful but to support those things that are good. I derive no satisfaction from opposing the growth of state sponsored welfare if I cannot fan the spark of family, enterprise, self-reliance and human dignity", for which he was praised by Liberal politician Tony Abbott for "a splendid maiden speech which managed to combine a robust expression of political philosophy and a hymn of praise to his splendid electorate."

Hawke increased his margin at the 2010 federal election, with a swing of 7.9 points and won the seat with 67.2 per cent of the two-party-preferred vote.

In September 2015, Hawke was promoted to Assistant Minister to the Treasurer in the First Turnbull ministry. Following the re-election of the Turnbull government, Hawke served as the Assistant Minister to the Minister for Immigration and Border Protection between 19 July 2016 and 20 December 2017.

=== Morrison government ===
During the 2018 Liberal Party of Australia leadership spills, Hawke was a strong supporter of Scott Morrison and considered part of his inner circle, along with Steve Irons and Stuart Robert. Hawke was seen as the tactical leader of the effort to unseat Turnbull. After the first spill on 21 August 2018, where Peter Dutton unsuccessfully challenged Turnbull, Hawke began mobilising the numbers for Morrison, who subsequently defeated Dutton and Julie Bishop in a second ballot on 24 August. There were also claims that Hawke had inside information coming from Bert van Manen, one of the deputy whips, who was also part of Morrison's bible study group.

In May 2019, Hawke was appointed as Minister for International Development and the Pacific and Assistant Minister for Defence. In December 2020, Hawke was appointed Minister for Immigration, Citizenship, Migrant Services and Multicultural Affairs in the Morrison ministry and served until May 2022, following the appointment of the Albanese ministry.

=== Political views ===
Hawke is a member of the Centre-Right faction of the Liberal Party.

Hawke is a personal opponent of same-sex marriage, and in the debate said that he does "not hold a view that people should not be treated equally under the law". He claimed that the family unit is the bedrock of society and that same sex marriage undermines that. He called for a conscience vote in parliament on the issue. He was reported to have abstained from the final vote on the Marriage Amendment (Definition and Religious Freedoms) Act 2017, which legalised same-sex marriage.

Through his position in the ministry he has called for closer ties to the Pacific region, and to assist them with development. Hawke said that "their prosperity is our prosperity". He has supported the shake up of foreign aid which involves a reduction of the foreign aid budget, and according to critics, will allow China more influence in the Pacific region. However these new closer ties did not require further action on climate change despite the calls from Pacific leaders for Australia to reduce their carbon emissions to help the low lying Pacific islands.

Hawke has been consistent in his views of limiting the government responses to climate change. In his speeches for the introduction of the Gillard government's carbon tax, Hawke spoke about the action not being sufficient to affect a meaningful change and therefore should not be done. He has also claimed that no one has done more to negate the effects of regional climate change than Australia, a claim the Pacific nations reject.

Hawke declined to intervene as the assistant immigration minister in the case of an intellectually disabled woman who was being cared for in the home by her family in her application for permanent residency. The decision of the immigration department would have meant a return to her country of origin where she had no family and likely institutionalization.

On 14 January 2022, Hawke exercised personal ministerial powers under sections 133C(3) and 116(1)(e)(i) of the Migration Act 1958 to cancel the visa of No.1 ranked ATP tennis player Novak Djokovic a few days prior to the commencement of the 2022 Australian Open Grand Slam. The visa was cancelled on "health and good order grounds" and on 16 January Djokovic was removed from Australia once all legal challenges were exhausted.

== Controversies ==
In 2018, Hawke said he strongly supported new rules to allow religious schools to expel students who are gay, bisexual or transgender, warning that people of faith were under attack in Australia: "I don't think it's controversial in Australia that people expect religious schools to teach the practice of their faith and their religion [...] We're mostly talking about the primary system and very very young people who are below the age of consent. So this is a manufactured issue that the left is raising to try and circumvent religious freedom".

Also in 2018, Buzzfeed News reported that Alex Hawke was outspending high-profile party members Scott Morrison and Tony Abbott on printing services, despite holding a seat by a 21.4-point margin. The company responsible for the printing, Zion Graphics, owned no commercial printer but instead outsourced the printing and charged a premium for the service. Zion Graphics was owned by Rudy Limantono, then president of the Bella Vista Liberal party branch and party donor. A defamation claim was made by Limontono, directed at Buzzfeed, which was settled out of court in 2019. Buzzfeed issued an apology, which included a statement clarifying that it had not intended to present Zion Graphics as anything other than a legitimate business. A follow-up investigation by Australian Printer discovered that the 3rd party contractor that Buzzfeed had claimed Zion Graphics procured printing services from, Hills Banners, had never had Zion Graphics as a client or business partner.

Hawke accused the first Muslim woman elected to parliament, Egyptian born Anne Aly, of thinking that "her diversity as something better than other people's diversity". When challenged on these statements, Hawke responded by saying that Labor were "feigning outrage and falsely claiming racism" in order to shut down debate, and that they were "fixated on identity politics and appears constantly triggered by anything and everything".

In February 2024, Hawke faced an expulsion motion at the NSW Liberals State Council, accused of delaying preselections ahead of the 2022 Australian federal election for factional benefits.

Hawke has over his time before and during parliament been accused of internal factional dealings and coordinating branch stacking, both in his electorate and on behalf of his faction, across New South Wales.

== Personal life ==
Hawke was married to Rebecca Davie, an environmental lawyer. They met in 2003 and married in 2010 before deciding to separate in April 2013. Hawke married Amelia McManus, a policy advisor for Michael Keenan, later in 2013.

Hawke was raised as an Anglican, but now attends Hillsong Church.

Parliament of Australia
Preceded by Alan Cadman	Member for Mitchell; 2007–present	Incumbent
Political offices
Preceded by David Coleman	Minister for Immigration, Citizenship, Migrant Services and Multicultural Affairs; 2020-2022	Succeeded by Andrew Giles
Preceded by Anne Ruston	Minister for International Development and the Pacific; 2019-2020	Succeeded by Zed Seselja
Preceded by David Fawcett	Assistant Minister for Defence; 2019-2020	Succeeded by Andrew Hastie
Preceded by Mathias Cormann	Special Minister of State; 2018–2019	Succeeded by Mathias Cormann
Preceded by Himself as Assistant Minister to the Minister for Immigration and Border Protection	Assistant Minister for Home Affairs; 2017–2018	Succeeded by Linda Reynolds
Preceded by James McGrath	Assistant Minister to the Minister for Immigration and Border Protection; 2016–2017	Succeeded by Himself as Assistant Minister for Home Affairs
Preceded by Kelly O'Dwyer	Assistant Minister to the Treasurer; 2015–2016	Succeeded by Michael Sukkar
