= Opinion polling for the 2019 Australian federal election =

Australian opinion polling

In the leadup to the 2019 federal election, a number of polling companies conducted regular opinion polls for various news organisations. These polls collected data on party's primary vote, and contained an estimation of the two-party-preferred vote. They also asked questions about views of the electorate about the major party leaders.

== Graphical summary ==
Two-party-preferred vote.

Primary vote.

Aggregate data of voting intention from all opinion polling since the last election. Local regression trends for each party are shown as solid lines.

== Voting intention ==
House of Representatives (lower house) polling
Date	Firm	Primary vote					TPP vote
		L/NP	ALP	GRN	ONP	OTH	L/NP	ALP
18 May 2019 election		41.44%	33.34%	10.4%	3.08%	11.74%	51.53%	48.47%
18 May 2019	YouGov-Galaxy (Exit Poll)	39%	38%	10%	n/a	10%	48%	52%
15–16 May 2019PM{	Newspoll	38%	37%	9%	3%	13% (Note: 5% UAP, 8% Independents/Other)	48.5%	51.5%
13–15 May 2019	YouGov-Galaxy	39%	37%	9%	3%	12% (Note: 3% UAP, 9% Independents/Other)	49%	51%
12–15 May 2019	Ipsos	39%	33%	13%	4%	11% (Note: 3% UAP, 8% Independents/Other)	49%	51%
10–14 May 2019	Essential	38.5%	36.2%	9.1%	6.6%	9.6%	48.5%	51.5%
10–12 May 2019	Roy Morgan	38.5%	35.5%	10%	4%	12% (Note: 3.5% UAP, 8.5% Independents/Other)	48%	52%
9–11 May 2019	Newspoll	39%	37%	9%	4%	11% (Note: 4% UAP, 7% Other)	49%	51%
8 May 2019	Third leaders' debate
2–6 May 2019	Essential	38%	34%	12%	7%	9%	48%	52%
4–5 May 2019	Roy Morgan	38.5%	34%	11%	4%	12.5% (Note: 3.5% UAP, 9% Other)	49%	51%
2–5 May 2019	Newspoll	38%	36%	9%	5%	12% (Note: 4% UAP, 8% Other)	49%	51%
1–4 May 2019	Ipsos	36%	33%	14%	5%	12% (Note: 3% UAP, 7% Other)	48%	52%
3 May 2019	Second leaders' debate
29 Apr 2019	First leaders' debate
25–29 Apr 2019	Essential	39%	37%	9%	6%	9%	49%	51%
27–28 Apr 2019	Roy Morgan	39.5%	36%	9.5%	2.5%	12.5% (Note: 2.0% UAP, 10.5% Other)	49%	51%
26–28 Apr 2019	Newspoll	38%	37%	9%	4%	12% (Note: 5% UAP, 7% Other)	49%	51%
23–25 Apr 2019	Galaxy	37%	37%	9%	4%	13% (Note: 4% UAP, 9% Other)	48%	52%
20–21 Apr 2019	Roy Morgan	39%	35.5%	9.5%	4.5%	11.5% (Note: 2.0% UAP, 9.5% Other)	49%	51%
11–14 Apr 2019	Newspoll	39%	39%	9%	4%	9%	48%	52%
11 Apr 2019	2019 federal election campaign begins
4–8 Apr 2019	Essential	38%	35%	11%	5%	10%	48%	52%
6–7 Apr 2019	Roy Morgan	37%	35%	13.5%	4%	10.5% (Note: 1.5% UAP, 1% CON, 0.5% KAP, 7.5%, Other)	47.5%	52.5%
4–7 Apr 2019	Newspoll	38%	37%	9%	6%	10%	48%	52%
3–6 Apr 2019	Ipsos	37%	34%	13%	5%	11%	47%	53%
25–28 Mar 2019	Galaxy	35%	37%	10%	8%	10% (Note: 3% UAP, 2% CON, 3% Other)	47%	53%
20–25 Mar 2019	Essential	39%	36%	10%	7%	8%	48%	52%
6–11 Mar 2019	Essential	37%	38%	8%	7%	10%	47%	53%
7–10 Mar 2019	Newspoll	36%	39%	9%	7%	9%	46%	54%
20–25 Feb 2019	Essential	38%	37%	9%	6%	10%	48%	52%
21–24 Feb 2019	Newspoll	37%	39%	9%	5%	10%	47%	53%
12–15 Feb 2019	Ipsos	38%	33%	13%	5%	11%	49%	51%
6–11 Feb 2019	Essential	34%	38%	10%	7%	11%	45%	55%
7–10 Feb 2019	Newspoll	37%	39%	9%	5%	10%	47%	53%
23–31 Jan 2019	Essential	38%	36%	10%	7%	9%	48%	52%
24–27 Jan 2019	Newspoll	37%	38%	9%	6%	10%	47%	53%
9–13 Jan 2019	Essential	38%	38%	10%	7%	7%	47%	53%
13–16 Dec 2018	Essential	37%	36%	11%	7%	9%	47%	53%
12–15 Dec 2018	Ipsos	36%	37%	13%	6%	9%	46%	54%
6–9 Dec 2018	Newspoll	35%	41%	9%	7%	8%	45%	55%
29 Nov – 2 Dec 2018	Essential	38%	39%	10%	6%	7%	46%	54%
22–25 Nov 2018	Newspoll	34%	40%	9%	8%	9%	45%	55%
15–18 Nov 2018	Essential	37%	35%	11%	7%	10%	48%	52%
15–17 Nov 2018	Ipsos	37%	34%	13%	5%	11%	48%	52%
8–11 Nov 2018	Newspoll	35%	40%	9%	6%	10%	45%	55%
1–4 Nov 2018	Essential	36%	39%	10%	6%	9%	46%	54%
25–28 Oct 2018	Newspoll	36%	39%	9%	6%	10%	46%	54%
18–21 Oct 2018	Essential	38%	37%	10%	7%	8%	47%	53%
11–13 Oct 2018	Newspoll	37%	38%	11%	6%	8%	47%	53%
10–13 Oct 2018	Ipsos	35%	35%	15%	5%	10%	45%	55%
5–7 Oct 2018	Essential	37%	36%	12%	5%	10%	47%	53%
20–23 Sep 2018	Essential	37%	36%	12%	5%	10%	47%	53%
20–23 Sep 2018	Newspoll	36%	39%	10%	6%	9%	46%	54%
12–15 Sep 2018	Ipsos	34%	31%	15%	7%	13%	47%	53%
6–9 Sep 2018	Essential	36%	37%	10%	8%	9%	46%	54%
6–9 Sep 2018	Newspoll	34%	42%	10%	6%	8%	44%	56%
25–26 Aug 2018	Roy Morgan	36.5%	36%	13%	2.5%	12%	46%	54%
24–26 Aug 2018	Essential	35%	39%	10%	7%	9%	45%	55%
24–25 Aug 2018	Newspoll	33%	41%	10%	7%	9%	44%	56%
24 Aug 2018	Scott Morrison elected Prime Minister in leadership spill against Malcolm Turnbull
15–18 Aug 2018	Ipsos	33%	35%	13%	8%	11%	45%	55%
9-12 Aug 2018	Newspoll	37%	35%	10%	9%	9%	49%	51%
2-2 Aug 2018	ReachTEL	37%	34%	12%	8%	8%	48%	52%
26-29 Jul 2018	Newspoll	39%	36%	10%	7%	8%	49%	51%
12-15 Jul 2018	Essential	40%	36%	10%	6%	8%	49%	51%
12-15 Jul 2018	Newspoll	38%	36%	10%	7%	9%	49%	51%
28 Jun - 1 Jul 2018	Essential	40%	37%	11%	6%	6%	48%	52%
28 Jun - 1 Jul 2018	Newspoll	39%	37%	9%	6%	9%	49%	51%
21–24 Jun 2018	Ipsos	35%	35%	12%	6%	12%	47%	53%
14–17 Jun 2018	Newspoll	38%	38%	10%	6%	8%	48%	52%
14–17 Jun 2018	Essential	38%	35%	11%	7%	9%	48%	52%
2 Jun 2018	ReachTEL	35%	34%	11%	9%	11%	48%	52%
31 May – 3 Jun 2018	Essential	36%	37%	10%	8%	9%	46%	54%
24–27 May 2018	Newspoll	38%	38%	9%	8%	7%	48%	52%
17–20 May 2018	Essential	40%	36%	10%	8%	7%	49%	51%
10–13 May 2018	Essential	38%	36%	10%	7%	8%	48%	52%
10–13 May 2018	Newspoll	39%	38%	9%	6%	8%	49%	51%
10–12 May 2018	Ipsos	36%	37%	11%	5%	11%	46%	54%
3–6 May 2018	Essential	38%	37%	10%	6%	9%	47%	53%
30 Apr 2018	ReachTEL	36%	35%	11%	6%	12%	48%	52%
19–22 Apr 2018	Essential	37%	36%	11%	8%	8%	47%	53%
19-22 Apr 2018	Newspoll	38%	37%	9%	7%	9%	49%	51%
5–8 Apr 2018	Essential	38%	37%	10%	7%	8%	47%	53%
5–8 Apr 2018	Newspoll	38%	37%	10%	7%	8%	48%	52%
3–5 Apr 2018	Ipsos	36%	34%	12%	8%	10%	48%	52%
24 Mar – 1 Apr 2018	Roy Morgan	38.5%	37.5%	11%	3%	10%	49%	51%
28 Mar 2018	ReachTEL	34%	36%	10%	7%	13%	46%	54%
22–25 Mar 2018	Essential	38%	36%	9%	8%	9%	48%	52%
22–25 Mar 2018	Newspoll	37%	39%	9%	7%	8%	47%	53%
17–25 Mar 2018	Roy Morgan	40%	35%	12%	3.5%	9.5%	49%	51%
8–11 Mar 2018	Essential	36%	38%	9%	8%	9%	46%	54%
3–11 Mar 2018	Roy Morgan	36%	36%	13.5%	3%	11.5%	46%	54%
1–4 Mar 2018	Newspoll	37%	38%	9%	7%	9%	47%	53%
22–25 Feb 2018	Essential	35%	35%	10%	8%	12%	47%	53%
24 Feb 2018	ReachTEL	33%	37%	11%	7%	12%	46%	54%
15–18 Feb 2018	Newspoll	36%	37%	10%	8%	9%	47%	53%
8–11 Feb 2018	Essential	36%	37%	10%	6%	11%	46%	54%
1–3 Feb 2018	Newspoll	38%	37%	10%	5%	10%	48%	52%
26–28 Jan 2018	Essential	35%	36%	10%	8%	11%	46%	54%
25 Jan 2018	ReachTEL	34%	36%	10%	8%	12%	48%	52%
11–15 Jan 2018	Essential	37%	38%	9%	6%	10%	47%	53%
19 Dec 2017	Essential	37%	38%	9%	7%	9%	47%	53%
14–17 Dec 2017	Newspoll	36%	37%	10%	7%	10%	47%	53%
12 Dec 2017	Essential	35%	38%	10%	7%	9%	46%	54%
7–10 Dec 2017	YouGov	34%	35%	11%	8%	13%	50%	50%
5 Dec 2017	Essential	35%	38%	9%	8%	10%	45%	55%
30 Nov − 3 Dec 2017	Newspoll	36%	37%	10%	8%	9%	47%	53%
29 Nov 2017	ReachTEL	33%	36%	10%	9%	12%	47%	53%
28 Nov 2017	Essential	36%	38%	9%	8%	9%	46%	54%
23–27 Nov 2017	YouGov	32%	32%	10%	11%	16%	47%	53%
21 Nov 2017	Essential	35%	38%	9%	8%	10%	46%	54%
14 Nov 2017	YouGov	31%	34%	11%	11%	14%	48%	52%
14 Nov 2017	Essential	36%	38%	9%	8%	10%	46%	54%
13 Nov 2017	Newspoll	34%	38%	9%	10%	9%	45%	55%
30 Oct 2017	Essential	36%	37%	10%	7%	9%	46%	54%
26–29 Oct 2017	Newspoll	35%	37%	10%	9%	9%	46%	54%
24 Oct 2017	Essential	37%	36%	9%	8%	10%	48%	52%
12–15 Oct 2017	Newspoll	36%	37%	10%	9%	8%	46%	54%
4 Oct 2017	Essential	36%	38%	10%	7%	10%	46%	54%
1 Oct 2017	ReachTEL	36%	38%	9%	8%	9%	47%	53%
26 Sep 2017	Essential	37%	37%	10%	7%	9%	47%	53%
21–24 Sep 2017	Newspoll	36%	38%	9%	8%	9%	46%	54%
19 Sep 2017	Essential	38%	36%	10%	8%	8%	48%	52%
14–18 Sep 2017	YouGov	34%	35%	11%	9%	11%	50%	50%
12 Sep 2017	Essential	36%	37%	10%	9%	8%	46%	54%
6–9 Sep 2017	Ipsos	35%	34%	14%	1%	15%	47%	53%
5 Sep 2017	Essential	36%	37%	10%	8%	9%	47%	53%
31 Aug – 4 Sep 2017	YouGov	34%	32%	12%	9%	13%	50%	50%
28 Aug – 2 Sep 2017	Newspoll	37%	38%	9%	8%	8%	47%	53%
29 Aug 2017	Essential	37%	36%	10%	8%	9%	47%	53%
23 Aug 2017	ReachTEL	34.5%	36.7%	10.3%	10.4%	8.2%	48%	52%
22 Aug 2017	Essential	37%	37%	9%	8%	9%	47%	53%
17–21 Aug 2017	YouGov	34%	33%	10%	10%	13%	51%	49%
17–20 Aug 2017	Newspoll	35%	38%	9%	9%	9%	46%	54%
15 Aug 2017	Essential	37%	39%	9%	8%	7%	46%	54%
8 Aug 2017	Essential	37%	39%	9%	8%	7%	46%	54%
3–6 Aug 2017	Newspoll	36%	36%	11%	8%	9%	47%	53%
1 Aug 2017	Essential	38%	36%	10%	8%	8%	48%	52%
25 Jul 2017	Essential	38%	37%	10%	7%	8%	47%	53%
20–24 Jul 2017	YouGov	36%	33%	10%	8%	13%	50%	50%
20–23 Jul 2017	Newspoll	36%	37%	9%	9%	9%	47%	53%
19 Jul 2017	ReachTEL	37.2%	35.1%	8.8%	11.7%	7.2%	49%	51%
18 Jul 2017	Essential	36%	38%	10%	7%	9%	46%	54%
6–11 Jul 2017	YouGov	36%	33%	12%	7%	12%	52%	48%
6–9 Jul 2017	Newspoll	35%	36%	10%	11%	8%	47%	53%
29 June 2017	ReachTEL	36.4%	35.4%	10.2%	9.6%	8.3%	48%	52%
22–27 Jun 2017	YouGov	33%	34%	12%	7%	14%	49%	51%
15–18 Jun 2017	Newspoll	36%	37%	9%	11%	7%	47%	53%
14 June 2017	Essential	38%	36%	10%	8%	8%	48%	52%
26–29 May 2017	Newspoll	36%	36%	10%	9%	9%	47%	53%
23 May 2017	Essential	37%	38%	10%	6%	9%	46%	54%
12–15 May 2017	Newspoll	36%	36%	10%	9%	9%	47%	53%
11 May 2017	ReachTEL	38%	34.1%	10.9%	11%	6%	47%	53%
10–11 May 2017	Ipsos	37%	35%	13%	2%	13%	47%	53%
26–30 Apr 2017	Essential	38%	37%	9%	7%	9%	47%	53%
20–23 Apr 2017	Newspoll	36%	35%	9%	10%	10%	48%	52%
13–16 Apr 2017	Essential	36%	37%	10%	8%	10%	46%	54%
6–9 Apr 2017	Essential	37%	36%	10%	8%	9%	47%	53%
1–4 Apr 2017	Essential	37%	36%	10%	8%	9%	47%	53%
30 Mar – 2 Apr 2017	Newspoll	36%	36%	10%	10%	8%	47%	53%
24–27 Mar 2017	Essential	35%	37%	10%	8%	11%	46%	54%
22–25 Mar 2017	Ipsos	33%	34%	16%	2%	15%	45%	55%
17–20 Mar 2017	Essential	34%	37%	9%	10%	9%	45%	55%
16–19 Mar 2017	Newspoll	37%	35%	9%	10%	9%	48%	52%
10–13 Mar 2017	Essential	35%	36%	9%	11%	9%	47%	53%
3–6 Mar 2017	Essential	37%	37%	9%	9%	8%	47%	53%
23–26 Feb 2017	Newspoll	34%	37%	10%	10%	9%	45%	55%
16–19 Feb 2017	Essential	36%	34%	10%	10%	10%	48%	52%
9–12 Feb 2017	Essential	36%	35%	9%	10%	9%	48%	52%
2–5 Feb 2017	Newspoll	35%	36%	10%	8%	11%	46%	54%
20–23 Jan 2017	Essential	35%	37%	10%	9%	8%	46%	54%
13–16 Jan 2017	Essential	38%	37%	9%	8%	8%	47%	53%
12 Jan 2017	ReachTEL	37.1%	35.0%	9.8%	10.6%	7.5%	46%	54%
9–12 Dec 2016	Essential	37%	37%	9%	7%	9%	47%	53%
1–4 Dec 2016	Newspoll	39%	36%	10%	5%	10%	48%	52%
25–28 Nov 2016	Essential	39%	36%	9%	7%	9%	49%	51%
24–26 Nov 2016	Ipsos	36%	30%	16%	7%	9%	49%	51%
17–20 Nov 2016	Newspoll	38%	38%	10%	4%	10%	47%	53%
11–14 Nov 2016	Essential	37%	37%	11%	6%	9%	47%	53%
3–6 Nov 2016	Newspoll	39%	38%	10%	–	13%	47%	53%
20–23 Oct 2016	Newspoll	39%	37%	10%	5%	9%	48%	52%
14–17 Oct 2016	Essential	37%	37%	11%	5%	9%	47%	53%
7–10 Oct 2016	Essential	38%	36%	10%	6%	10%	48%	52%
6–9 Oct 2016	Newspoll	39%	36%	10%	6%	9%	48%	52%
22–25 Sep 2016	Newspoll	38%	37%	10%	–	15%	48%	52%
9–12 Sep 2016	Essential	38%	37%	10%	5%	11%	48%	52%
8–11 Sep 2016	Newspoll	41%	36%	9%	–	14%	50%	50%
26–29 Aug 2016	Essential	40%	37%	10%	–	13%	49%	51%
25–28 Aug 2016	Newspoll	41%	36%	9%	–	14%	50%	50%
19–22 Aug 2016	Essential	39%	36%	10%	–	15%	49%	51%
12–15 Aug 2016	Essential	39%	37%	10%	–	14%	48%	52%
5–8 Aug 2016	Essential	40%	37%	10%	–	13%	48%	52%
27 Jul – 1 Aug 2016	Essential	39%	37%	10%	–	14%	48%	52%
20–24 Jul 2016	Essential	39%	37%	10%	–	14%	48%	52%
13–17 Jul 2016	Essential	39%	36%	10%	–	15%	49%	51%
6–10 Jul 2016	Essential	41%	36%	10%	–	13%	49%	51%
30 Jun – 3 Jul 2016	Essential	41%	37%	10%	–	12%	50%	50%
2 July 2016 election		42.0%	34.7%	10.2%	1.3%	11.8%	50.4%	49.6%
28 Jun – 1 Jul 2016	Newspoll	42%	35%	10%	–	13%	50.5%	49.5%
30 Jun 2016	ReachTEL	42.8%	34.6%	10.7%	–	12%	51%	49%
27–30 Jun 2016	Essential	42.5%	34.5%	11.5%	–	12%	50.5%	49.5%
28–29 Jun 2016	Galaxy	43%	36%	10%	–	11%	51%	49%
26–29 Jun 2016	Ipsos	40%	33%	13%	–	14%	50%	50%

== Preferred prime minister, and satisfaction ==
Graph of opinion polls conducted View source data.
Graph of opinion polls conducted View source data.

Leadership polling
Date	Firm	Preferred prime minister		Morrison		Shorten
		Morrison	Shorten	Satisfied	Dissatisfied	Satisfied	Dissatisfied
15–16 May 2019	Newspoll	45%	38%	46%	45%	41%	49%
12–15 May 2019	Ipsos	47%	40%	48%	43%	43%	48%
1–4 Apr 2019	Ipsos	46%	35%	47%	44%	40%	51%
3–6 Apr 2019	Ipsos	46%	35%	48%	39%	36%	51%
17 Feb 2019	Ipsos	48%	38%	49%	40%	40%	52%
7–10 Feb 2019	Newspoll	44%	35%	43%	45%	36%	51%
13–15 Dec 2018	Ipsos	46%	37%	47%	39%	41%	50%
8–11 Nov 2018	Newspoll	42%	36%	39%	47%	35%	50%
25–28 Oct 2018	Newspoll	43%	35%	41%	44%	37%	50%
19–21 Oct 2018	Essential	42%	27%	43%	28%	33%	28%
22–24 Sep 2018	Essential	39%	27%	37%	31%	35%	31%
20–23 Sep 2018	Newspoll	45%	32%	44%	39%	32%	54%
8–10 Sep 2018	Essential	39%	27%	37%	31%	35%	43%
6–9 Sep 2018	Newspoll	42%	36%	41%	39%	37%	51%
24–25 Aug 2018	Newspoll	33%	39%	–	–	–	–
24 Aug 2018	Scott Morrison replaces Malcolm Turnbull as Liberal leader
		Turnbull	Shorten	Turnbull		Shorten
9–12 Aug 2018	Newspoll	44%	32%	36%	55%	32%	56%
26–29 Jul 2018	Newspoll	48%	29%	42%	48%	32%	57%
18–21 Jul 2018	Ipsos	57%	30%	55%	38%	38%	54%
16 July 2018	Newspoll	48%	29%	39%	50%	33%	55%
10–13 May 2018	Newspoll	46%	32%	41%	49%	32%	56%
3–6 May 2018	Essential	40%	26%	40%	42%	37%	41%
4–6 Mar 2018	Essential	37%	35%	-	-	-	-
26–30 Apr 2017	Essential	45%	31%	35%	47%	33%	47%
20–23 Apr 2017	Newspoll	42%	33%	32%	57%	33%	53%
30 Mar – 2 April 2017	Newspoll	41%	32%	30%	59%	32%	54%
22–25 Mar 2017	Ipsos	45%	33%	-	-	-	-
17–20 Mar 2017	Essential	43%	29%	-	-	-	-
16–19 Mar 2017	Newspoll	43%	29%	30%	57%	29%	57%
10–13 Mar 2017	Essential	38%	26%	33%	50%	30%	49%
23–26 Feb 2017	Newspoll	40%	33%	29%	59%	30%	56%
2–5 Feb 2017	Newspoll	42%	30%	35%	54%	32%	54%
1–4 Dec 2016	Newspoll	41%	32%	32%	55%	34%	51%
24–26 Nov 2016	Ipsos	51%	30%	45%	45%	37%	53%
17–20 Nov 2016	Newspoll	43%	33%	34%	54%	36%	51%
3–6 Nov 2016	Newspoll	42%	32%	30%	58%	36%	51%
20–23 Oct 2016	Newspoll	42%	32%	29%	57%	36%	51%
6–9 Oct 2016	Newspoll	45%	30%	31%	56%	35%	51%
9–12 Sep 2016	Essential	41%	26%	35%	43%	36%	41%
8–11 Sep 2016	Newspoll	43%	31%	34%	53%	35%	52%
25–28 Aug 2016	Newspoll	43%	32%	34%	52%	36%	50%
5–8 Aug 2016	Essential	40%	30%	38%	43%	37%	41%
6–10 Jul 2016	Essential	39%	31%	37%	48%	39%	41%
2 July 2016 election
28 Jun – 1 July 2016	Newspoll	48%	31%	40%	47%	36%	51%
30 June 2016	ReachTEL	52.9%	47.1%	-	-	-	-
26–29 Jun 2016	Ipsos	49%	35%	49%	41%	42%	50%
23–26 Jun 2016	Essential	40%	29%	40%	40%	37%	39%
^ Remainder were "uncommitted" to either leader.

== See also ==
- 2019 Australian federal election
- Electorate opinion polling for the 2019 Australian federal election
