= Electorate opinion polling for the 2019 Australian federal election =

Various research and polling firms conducted opinion polling before the 2019 Australian federal election in individual electorates across Australia, in relation to voting intentions in the House of Representatives.

== New South Wales ==
=== Gilmore ===
Date	Firm	Sample size	Margin of error	Primary vote						2PP vote	
Date	Firm	Sample size	Margin of error	ALP	LIB	NAT	GRN	UAP	OTH	ALP	LIB
18 May 2019	2019 federal election			36.2%	29.2%	12.5%	10.0%	3.4%	8.8%	52.6%	47.8%
Mid-May 2019	YouGov Galaxy	500+		—	—	—	—	—	—	52%	47%
2 Jul 2016	2016 federal election			45.3%	39.2%	—	10.5%	—	5.0%	49.3%	50.7%

=== Lindsay ===
Date	Firm	Sample size	Margin of error	Primary vote						2PP vote	
Date	Firm	Sample size	Margin of error	LIB	ALP	GRN	UAP	IND	OTH	LIB	ALP
18 May 2019	2019 federal election			46.5%	35.6%	4.9%	2.9%	2.9%	7.3%	55.0%	45.0%
9–11 May 2019	Newspoll	500-580		44%	39%	4%	6%	—	—	52%	48%
20 Apr 2019	Newspoll	618		41%	40%	4%	7%	—	8%	49%	51%
2 Jul 2016	2016 federal election			39.3%	41.1%	3.6%	—	2.4%	13.7%	48.9%	51.1%

=== Macquarie ===
Date	Firm	Sample size	Margin of error	Primary vote					2PP vote	
Date	Firm	Sample size	Margin of error	LIB	ALP	GRN	UAP	OTH	ALP	LIB
18 May 2019	2019 federal election			44.9%	38.3%	9.2%	4.0%	3.7%	50.2%	49.8%
Mid-May 2019	YouGov Galaxy	500+		—	—	—	—	—	53%	47%
2 Jul 2016	2016 federal election			38.2%	35.5%	11.2%	—	15.1%	52.2%	47.8%

=== Reid ===
Date	Firm	Sample size	Margin of error	Primary vote					2PP vote	
Date	Firm	Sample size	Margin of error	LIB	ALP	GRN	UAP	OTH	LIB	ALP
18 May 2019	2019 federal election			48.3%	37.2%	8.1%	1.9%	4.5%	53.2%	46.8%
Mid-May 2019	YouGov Galaxy	500+		—	—	—	—	—	52%	48%
2 Jul 2016	2016 federal election			48.8%	36.3%	8.5%	—	6.4%	54.7%	45.3%

=== Warringah ===
Date	Firm	Sample size	Margin of error	Primary vote							2CP vote		
Date	Firm	Sample size	Margin of error	IND	LIB	ALP	GRN	IND	UAP	OTH	IND	LIB	GRN
18 May 2019	2019 federal election			43.5%	39.0%	6.6%	6.1%	1.2%	0.7%	2.9%	57.2%	42.3%	—
9 Feb 2019 (released)	ReachTEL (Note: Commissioned by GetUp)	618		22.3%	37.7%	15.0%	9.6%	4.9%	—	5.7%	54.0%	46.0%	—
2 Jul 2016	2016 federal election			—	51.7%	14.8%	12.2%	12.1%	—	9.2%	—	61.6%	38.4%

== Queensland ==
=== Flynn ===
Date	Firm	Sample size	Margin of error	Primary vote						2PP vote	
Date	Firm	Sample size	Margin of error	LNP	ALP	ONP	UAP	GRN	OTH	LNP	ALP
18 May 2019	2019 federal election			37.9%	28.7%	19.6%	4.3%	3.1%	6.6%	58.7%	41.3%
Mid-May 2019	YouGov Galaxy	500+		—	—	—	11%	—	—	—	—
2 Jul 2016	2016 federal election			37.1%	33.4%	17.2%	—	2.8%	9.6%	51.0%	49.0%

=== Herbert ===
Date	Firm	Sample size	Margin of error	Primary vote							2PP vote	
Date	Firm	Sample size	Margin of error	LNP	ALP	ONP	KAP	GRN	UAP	OTH	LNP	ALP
18 May 2019	2019 federal election			37.1%	25.5%	11.1%	9.8%	7.3%	5.7%	3.5%	58.4%	41.6%
Mid-May 2019	YouGov Galaxy	500+		—	—	—	—	—	14%	—	—	—
9–11 May 2019	Newspoll	500-580		35%	30%	7%	13%	7%	7%	—	52%	48%
20 Apr 2019	Newspoll	529		31%	29%	9%	10%	5%	14%	2%	50%	50%
24 Jan 2019	Newspoll	509		32%	32%	9%	9%	7%	8%	3%	49%	51%
2 Jul 2016	2016 federal election			35.5%	30.5%	13.5%	6.9%	6.3%	0.4%	7.0%	50.0%	50.0%

== Victoria ==
=== Deakin ===
Date	Firm	Sample size	Margin of error	Primary vote					2PP vote	
Date	Firm	Sample size	Margin of error	LIB	ALP	GRN	UAP	OTH	LIB	ALP
18 May 2019	2019 federal election			47.8%	32.5%	9.0%	2.1%	8.6%	54.8%	45.2%
Mid-May 2019	YouGov Galaxy	500+		—	—	—	—	—	51%	49%
20 Apr 2019	Newspoll	535		46%	39%	8%	5%	—	51%	49%
2 Jul 2016	2016 federal election			50.0%	31.0%	11.7%	—	7.2%	55.7%	44.3%

=== Flinders ===
Date	Firm	Sample size	Margin of error	Primary vote						2PP vote	
Date	Firm	Sample size	Margin of error	LIB	ALP	IND	GRN	UAP	OTH	LIB	ALP
18 May 2019	2019 federal election			49.4%	21.2%	16.8%	10.2%	1.2%	1.1%	55.7%	44.3%
24 Jan 2019	ReachTEL/uComms	500–700		36.8%	—	—	—	—	—	49%	51%
2 Jul 2016	2016 federal election			51.6%	27.0%	3.1%	10.7%	—	7.6%	57.8%	42.2%

=== Higgins ===
Date	Firm	Sample size	Margin of error	Primary vote					2PP vote		
Date	Firm	Sample size	Margin of error	LIB	ALP	GRN	UAP	OTH	LIB	ALP	GRN
18 May 2019	2019 federal election			47.9%	25.4%	22.5%	1.2%	3.1%	55.7%	44.3%	—
13 May 2019 (released)	ER&C (Note: Commissioned by the Greens)	400		36%	30%	29%	—	—	46%	—	54%
Mid-May 2019	YouGov Galaxy	500+		—	—	29%	—	—	52%	—	48%
24 Jan 2019	ReachTEL/uComms	500–700		—	—	—	—	—	48%	52%	—
2 Jul 2016	2016 federal election			52.0%	15.0%	25.3%	—	7.7%	58.0%	—	42.0%

=== Kooyong ===
Date	Firm	Sample size	Margin of error	Primary vote						2CP vote		
Date	Firm	Sample size	Margin of error	LIB	GRN	ALP	IND	UAP	OTH	LIB	GRN	ALP
18 May 2019	2019 federal election			49.4%	21.2%	16.8%	10.2%	1.2%	1.1%	55.7%	44.3%	—
13 May 2019 (released)	ER&C	1,741		41%	21%	16%	9%	—	8%	52%	48%	—
11 Dec 2018	ReachTEL (Note: Commissioned by the Construction, Forestry, Mining, Maritime and Energy Union)	816		40%	16%	29%	—	—	8%	48%	—	52%
2 Jul 2016	2016 federal election			58.2%	18.9%	19.8%	3.1%	—	—	63.3%	—	36.7%

== Western Australia ==
=== Pearce ===
Date	Firm	Sample size	Margin of error	Primary vote							2PP vote	
Date	Firm	Sample size	Margin of error	LIB	ALP	GRN	ONP	UAP	NAT	OTH	LIB	ALP
18 May 2019	2019 federal election			43.7%	29.1%	8.7%	8.2%	2.5%	1.3%	6.5%	54.8%	45.2%
20 Apr 2019	Newspoll	509		40%	36%	8%	6%	8%	—	—	50%	50%
2 Jul 2016	2016 federal election			45.4%	34.3%	11.0%	—	—	4.7%	4.7%	53.6%	46.4%

== See also ==
- Opinion polling for the 2019 Australian federal election
