= Scott Buchholz =

Australian politician (born 1968)

The Honourable Scott Buchholz MP
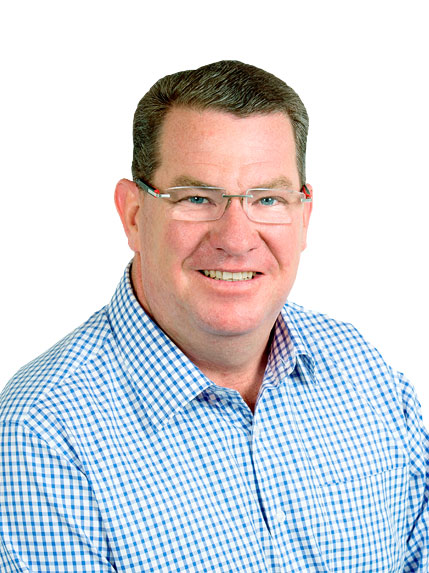
- Buchholz in 2020

Assistant Minister for Road Safety and Freight Transport
- In office 29 May 2019 – 23 May 2022
- Prime Minister: Scott Morrison
- Preceded by: Himself (as Assistant Minister for Roads and Transport)
- Succeeded by: Carol Brown (as Assistant Minister for Infrastructure and Transport)

Assistant Minister for Roads and Transport
- In office 28 August 2018 – 29 May 2019
- Prime Minister: Scott Morrison
- Succeeded by: Himself (as Assistant Minister for Road Safety and Freight Transport)

Chief Government Whip in the House of Representatives
- In office 13 February 2015 – 23 September 2015
- Prime Minister: Tony Abbott; Malcolm Turnbull
- Preceded by: Philip Ruddock
- Succeeded by: Nola Marino

Member of the Australian Parliament for Wright
- Incumbent
- Assumed office 21 August 2010

Personal details
- Born: 27 March 1968 (age 58) Rockhampton, Queensland, Australia
- Party: National (to 2008); LNP (from 2008)
- Other political affiliations: Liberal (parliamentary, since 2010)
- Education: St. Brendan's College, Yeppoon
- Alma mater: University of Southern Queensland (MBA)
- Profession: Businessman
- Website: www.scottbuchholz.com.au

Scott Andrew Buchholz (/ˈbʊkɒlts/ BUUK-olts; born 27 March 1968) is an Australian politician. He is a member of the Liberal National Party of Queensland (LNP) and served as an assistant minister in the Morrison government from 2018 until May 2022. He has represented the seat of Wright since the 2010 federal election, sitting with the parliamentary Liberal Party, and previously served as chief government whip in the House of Representatives in the Abbott government in 2015. He was a businessman in the transport industry before entering politics.

== Early life ==
Buchholz was born on 27 March 1968 in Rockhampton, Queensland. His father died when he was eight years old, after which he and his three siblings were raised by their mother on a widow's pension. He attended St. Brendan's College, Yeppoon.

From 1985 to 1987 Buchholz worked as a ringer on a station in Kilcummin. He subsequently moved to Emerald and worked in the agri-finance industry. Buchholz eventually established his own freight and courier business, starting with a contract for newspaper delivery between Emerald and Rockhampton. This was expanded, partially through mergers and acquisitions, to "14 depots across the state, employing 105 permanent staff and subcontractors". As of 2018 Buchholz was a director and shareholder of Central Queensland Express Holdings and Toowoomba Express Couriers. He was also a director of Lifeline Community Care.

== Politics ==
Buchholz was originally a member of the Queensland Nationals, serving as a delegate to state conference from 2007 and as chief of staff to the party's Senate leader Barnaby Joyce. He stood as a Senate candidate for the party at the 2007 federal election, placed sixth and last on the joint Coalition ticket. He was later appointed chairman of the transition action committee that conducted due diligence on the creation of the Liberal National Party of Queensland (LNP) in 2008 as a merger of the Nationals and Liberals.

=== Federal parliament ===
In June 2010, Buchholz won LNP preselection for the newly created Division of Wright, defeating seven other candidates including television presenter Bob La Castra and former MP Cameron Thompson. It was the second preselection vote held for Wright, following the disendorsement of the original candidate Hajnal Ban. Buchholz won the seat for the LNP at the 2010 federal election. Despite his prior affiliation with the Nationals, he joined the parliamentary Liberal Party as the LNP had allocated his seat to the Liberals.

After the 2013 election, Buchholz was appointed as a government whip. He was appointed the Chief Government Whip in the House of Representatives on 13 February 2015, replacing Philip Ruddock. He was removed from the position on 20 September 2015, shortly after Malcolm Turnbull replaced Tony Abbott as prime minister. Buchholz subsequently served terms as chair of the joint standing committee on electoral matters (2016) and the joint statutory committee on public works (2018). He was appointed to the speaker's panel in September 2016.

During the 2018 Liberal leadership spills, Buchholz reportedly voted for Peter Dutton against Malcolm Turnbull in the first vote. In the second vote days later, which saw Scott Morrison narrowly defeat Dutton, The Sydney Morning Herald listed him as one of two MPs whose votes were unknown. Following the spills, Buchholz was appointed Assistant Minister for Roads and Transport in the Morrison government. His title was changed to Assistant Minister for Road Safety and Freight Transport in May 2019, following the 2019 federal election and he held this position until May 2022, following the appointment of the Albanese ministry.

=== Political positions ===
Buchholz is a member of the National Right faction of the Liberal Party, after previously being aligned with the Centre-Right faction during the Morrison government years.

In 2010, Buchholz stated his support for a Liberal–National party merger at federal level modelled on the Queensland LNP. In 2017 he opposed calls for the Queensland LNP to de-merger following a series of electoral losses, stating "if you've lost your last 10 games of football and you've lost them because during the week the players are eating KFC and the coach is rolling up to the game pissed [...] changing the colour of your jersey is not going to make a skerrick of difference".

Buchholz has stated his opposition to same-sex marriage. After voting against a private member's bill on the subject in 2012, he stated "marriage is not an automatic action just because I or someone else had fallen in love. If that was the case, I am sure that the majority of society would be married several times over to many people, and think what would happen to those people who love their pets". In 2017, Buchholz's electorate voted in favour of same-sex marriage in the Australian Marriage Law Postal Survey. He subsequently voted in favour of the Marriage Amendment (Definition and Religious Freedoms) Act 2017 which legalised same-sex marriage in Australia, stating "my first responsibility is to represent the people of Wright and to take their views to the House of Representatives".

== Personal life ==
Buchholz has one daughter with his former wife. According to The New Daily, as of 2019 he owned a family home in Boonah as well as investment properties in Blackwater and Dugandan.

In February 2019, Buchholz publicly apologised for inappropriate behaviour towards a female Royal Australian Air Force officer while on a parliamentary exchange in Darwin in 2018. The Department of Defence did not release the details of the formal complaint made by the officer, but it was reported that Buchholz gave her an unwanted hug.

Parliament of Australia
New division	Member for Wright; 2010–present	Incumbent
