= Centre Right (Liberal Party of Australia) =

Political faction

Centre Right Faction Centre right, Morrison Club
- Faction Leader: Alex Hawke
- Founder: Alex Hawke
- Ideology: Pragmatism; Liberalism (Australian); Conservatism (Australian); Economic liberalism
- Political position: Centre-right
- Associated party: Liberal
- House of Representatives: 3 / 27 (2025 seats)
- Senate: 1 / 23 (2025 seats)

The Centre Right Faction or Centre Right Group is a faction within the federal Australian Liberal Party that constitutes one of its major internal groupings, with the other groups being the Moderate faction to its left and the National Right faction to its right.

The faction's main ideology can be seen as a soft mix of both the adjacent factions' ideologies. As noted by The Sydney Morning Herald in 2021: "The group's unifying philosophy is pragmatism – that means an adherence to free-market economics and relatively conservative social values." The ideological position, and pragmatism ("to yield results"), of the Centre Right Faction, is one of the reasons Scott Morrison was appointed leader of the party in 2018. As its nickname under Scott Morrison (Morrison Club) signifies, its figurehead was then–Prime Minister Scott Morrison, with Alex Hawke known as the leader of the faction.

During the Morrison government years, the Centre-Right was the largest faction, with 32 of 91 Liberal MPs belonging to the group. However, the 2022 Australian federal election saw a significant realignment of factional affiliations within the Liberal Party, with the Centre-Right going from being the largest faction to the smallest faction, plummeting from 32 members to just six, caused by a combination of members losing seats as well as members moving to other factions; the aftermath of the election saw the emergence of a "Centrist" faction consisting of former Moderate and Centre-Right MPs, mostly hailing from Victoria, with this group espousing similar ideological leanings to the Centre-Right faction in being more economically dry than the National Right and more socially conservative than the Moderates. Most of the factional power following the election defeat and leadership change was transferred to the Conservative Right led by the new Party Leader Peter Dutton. After the 2025 election, it appeared that the Centre Right had largely dissipated as a faction, with party members now divided more cleanly between the Moderates and National Right.

== Current Federal Members ==
As of 10 October 2025.

Name	Constituency	Current Shadow/Former Government Positions	State/Territory
Alex Hawke	Member for Mitchell	Manager of Opposition Business in the House Former Minister for Immigration and Foreign Affairs	NSW
Melissa McIntosh	Member for Lindsay	None	NSW
Scott Buchholz	Member for Wright	Former Assistant Minister for Road Safety and Freight Transport	QLD
Andrew McLachlan	Senator for SA	Former Deputy President of the Senate	SA
