= Electoral results for the Division of Fisher =

Australian division election results

This is a list of electoral results for the Division of Fisher in Australian federal elections from the division's creation in 1949 until the present.

== Members ==
Member	Party	Term
(Sir) Charles Adermann	Country	1949–1972
Evan Adermann	Country/National Country/National	1972–1984
Peter Slipper	National	1984–1987
Michael Lavarch	Labor	1987–1993
Peter Slipper	Liberal	1993–2010
Peter Slipper	Liberal National	2010–2011
Peter Slipper	Independent	2011–2013
Mal Brough	Liberal National	2013–2016
Andrew Wallace	Liberal National	2016–present

== Election results ==
=== Elections in the 2020s ===
==== 2025 ====
2025 Australian federal election: Fisher
Party	Candidate	Votes	%	±%
Independent	Keryn Jones			
Greens	Renay Wells			
Liberal National	Andrew Wallace			
Trumpet of Patriots	Denis Fricot			
Labor	Morrison Lakey			
People First	James Pidgeon			
Family First	Bronwen Bolitho			
One Nation	Benjamin Kelly			
Total formal votes				
Informal votes				
Turnout				

==== 2022 ====
2022 Australian federal election: Fisher
Party	Candidate	Votes	%	±%
Liberal National	Andrew Wallace	48,013	44.25	−5.79
Labor	Judene Andrews	25,313	23.33	+1.11
Greens	Renay Wells	14,981	13.81	+1.40
One Nation	Sam Schriever	10,102	9.31	+0.63
United Australia	Tony Moore	7,355	6.78	+3.32
Animal Justice	Vickie Breckenridge	2,730	2.52	+2.52
Total formal votes		108,494	96.85	+1.65
Informal votes		3,530	3.15	−1.65
Turnout		112,024	89.07	−2.89
Two-party-preferred result
Liberal National	Andrew Wallace	63,656	58.67	−4.03
Labor	Judene Andrews	44,838	41.33	+4.03
Liberal National hold		Swing	−4.03	

Alluvial diagram for preference flows in the seat of Fisher in the 2022 federal election. indicates at what stage the winning candidate had over 50% of the votes and was declared the winner.

=== Elections in the 2010s ===
==== 2019 ====
2019 Australian federal election: Fisher
Party	Candidate	Votes	%	±%
Liberal National	Andrew Wallace	49,567	50.04	+1.83
Labor	Daniel Parsell	22,011	22.22	−2.26
Greens	Tracy Burton	12,289	12.41	+0.11
One Nation	Christopher Paterson	8,596	8.68	+8.20
United Australia	Trevor Gray	3,429	3.46	+3.46
Conservative National	Mike Jessop	1,592	1.61	+1.61
Love Australia or Leave	Paul Monaghan	1,564	1.58	+1.58
Total formal votes		99,048	95.20	+2.01
Informal votes		4,992	4.80	−2.01
Turnout		104,040	91.96	+0.86
Two-party-preferred result
Liberal National	Andrew Wallace	62,100	62.70	+3.55
Labor	Daniel Parsell	36,948	37.30	−3.55
Liberal National hold		Swing	+3.55	

==== 2016 ====
2016 Australian federal election: Fisher
Party	Candidate	Votes	%	±%
Liberal National	Andrew Wallace	40,424	48.26	+3.79
Labor	Bill Gissane	20,670	24.68	+3.75
Greens	Tony Gibson	10,324	12.33	+4.73
Liberty Alliance	John Spellman	2,952	3.52	+3.52
Family First	Caroline Ashlin	2,927	3.49	+1.44
Ind. Whig	Mike Jessop	2,906	3.47	+3.47
Rise Up Australia	Tracey Bell-Henselin	2,210	2.64	+2.25
Defence Veterans	Jason Burgess	914	1.09	+1.09
Online Direct Democracy	LB Joum	438	0.52	+0.52
Total formal votes		83,765	93.15	−1.04
Informal votes		6,157	6.85	+1.04
Turnout		89,922	91.21	−2.31
Two-party-preferred result
Liberal National	Andrew Wallace	49,473	59.06	−0.69
Labor	Bill Gissane	34,292	40.94	+0.69
Liberal National hold		Swing	−0.69	

==== 2013 ====
2013 Australian federal election: Fisher
Party	Candidate	Votes	%	±%
Liberal National	Mal Brough	34,619	44.47	−2.01
Labor	Bill Gissane	16,297	20.93	−9.39
Palmer United	William Schoch	13,559	17.42	+17.42
Greens	Garry Claridge	5,908	7.59	−8.25
Katter's Australian	Mark Meldon	2,520	3.24	+3.24
Family First	Tony Moore	1,593	2.05	−5.31
	Peter Slipper	1,207	1.55	+1.55
Independent	Jarreau Terry	957	1.23	+1.23
Australian Independents	Mark Maguire	890	1.14	+1.14
Rise Up Australia	Rod Christensen	305	0.39	+0.39
Total formal votes		77,855	94.19	−0.64
Informal votes		4,803	5.81	+0.64
Turnout		82,658	93.52	+0.76
Two-party-preferred result
Liberal National	Mal Brough	46,522	59.75	+5.62
Labor	Bill Gissane	31,333	40.25	−5.62
Liberal National hold		Swing	+5.62	

==== 2010 ====
2010 Australian federal election: Fisher
Party	Candidate	Votes	%	±%
Liberal National	Peter Slipper	34,235	46.48	+2.28
Labor	Chris Cummins	22,332	30.32	−2.71
Greens	Garry Claridge	11,664	15.84	+9.91
Family First	Robyn Robertson	5,421	7.36	+4.88
Total formal votes		73,652	94.83	−2.36
Informal votes		4,013	5.17	+2.36
Turnout		77,665	92.73	−0.38
Two-party-preferred result
Liberal National	Peter Slipper	39,868	54.13	+0.60
Labor	Chris Cummins	33,784	45.87	−0.60
Liberal National hold		Swing	+0.60	

=== Elections in the 2000s ===
==== 2007 ====
2007 Australian federal election: Fisher
Party	Candidate	Votes	%	±%
Liberal	Peter Slipper	35,182	44.14	−10.11
Labor	Darrell Main	27,074	33.97	+3.05
Independent	Caroline Hutchinson	10,596	13.29	+13.29
Greens	Matthew Gray	4,474	5.61	−0.09
Family First	Graeme Cumming	1,728	2.17	−1.33
Democrats	Carolyn Kerr	655	0.82	−0.78
Total formal votes		79,079	97.06	+2.72
Informal votes		2,418	2.94	−2.72
Turnout		82,127	94.65	+1.99
Two-party-preferred result
Liberal	Peter Slipper	42,325	53.10	−7.88
Labor	Darrell Main	37,384	46.90	+7.88
Liberal hold		Swing	−7.88	

==== 2004 ====
2004 Australian federal election: Fisher
Party	Candidate	Votes	%	±%
Liberal	Peter Slipper	42,651	55.87	+3.85
Labor	John Gray	22,011	28.84	+3.46
Greens	Robert Muston	4,617	6.05	+1.87
Family First	Ronald Stuart Hill	3,174	4.16	+4.16
One Nation	Kevin J Savage	1,929	2.53	−4.88
Democrats	Craig Wilmot	1,201	1.57	−2.20
Great Australians	Liz Hays	748	0.98	+0.98
Total formal votes		76,321	94.64	−0.94
Informal votes		4,320	5.36	+0.94
Turnout		80,641	93.78	+0.74
Two-party-preferred result
Liberal	Peter Slipper	48,068	62.98	+1.21
Labor	John Gray	28,253	37.02	−1.21
Liberal hold		Swing	+1.21	

==== 2001 ====
2001 Australian federal election: Fisher
Party	Candidate	Votes	%	±%
Liberal	Peter Slipper	40,173	51.95	+3.93
Labor	Ray O'Donnell	19,406	25.10	−2.69
Independent	Ros Hourigan	6,002	7.76	+7.76
One Nation	Bruce Tannock	5,838	7.55	−7.11
Greens	Tony McLeod	3,032	3.92	+1.24
Democrats	Geoff Armstrong	2,872	3.71	−0.19
Total formal votes		77,323	95.62	−1.33
Informal votes		3,543	4.38	+1.33
Turnout		80,866	95.68	
Two-party-preferred result
Liberal	Peter Slipper	47,988	62.06	+1.06
Labor	Ray O'Donnell	29,335	37.94	−1.06
Liberal hold		Swing	+1.06	

=== Elections in the 1990s ===
==== 1998 ====
1998 Australian federal election: Fisher
Party	Candidate	Votes	%	±%
Liberal	Peter Slipper	33,187	48.02	−9.06
Labor	Ray O'Donnell	19,205	27.79	+4.54
One Nation	Tim Jenkins	10,132	14.66	+14.66
Democrats	Jenny Henman	2,697	3.90	−1.79
Greens	Les Shotton	1,852	2.68	−0.47
Christian Democrats	Peter Urquhart	1,348	1.95	+1.95
Independent	Alexander Taylor	396	0.57	+0.57
Independent	Trevor Mumford	289	0.42	+0.42
Total formal votes		69,106	96.94	−0.77
Informal votes		2,178	3.06	+0.77
Turnout		71,284	94.02	−0.87
Two-party-preferred result
Liberal	Peter Slipper	42,152	61.00	−9.64
Labor	Ray O'Donnell	26,954	39.00	+9.64
Liberal hold		Swing	−9.64	

==== 1996 ====
1996 Australian federal election: Fisher
Party	Candidate	Votes	%	±%
Liberal	Peter Slipper	30,902	45.07	+12.13
Labor	John Henderson	15,685	22.88	−8.69
National	John Bjelke-Petersen	14,115	20.59	−0.25
Democrats	Alan Kerlin	3,625	5.29	+2.09
Greens	Chris Gwin	1,686	2.46	−0.37
Independent	Lorraine Barnes	830	1.21	+1.21
Women's Party	Louise Peach	826	1.20	+1.20
Against Further Immigration	Margaret Lazarenko	523	0.76	+0.76
Independent	Gordon Earnshaw	257	0.37	+0.37
Indigenous Peoples	Alex Bond	117	0.17	−0.07
Total formal votes		68,566	97.45	−0.21
Informal votes		1,794	2.55	+0.21
Turnout		70,360	94.89	−0.92
Two-party-preferred result
Liberal	Peter Slipper	48,107	70.34	+10.02
Labor	John Henderson	20,286	29.66	−10.02
Liberal hold		Swing	+10.02	

==== 1993 ====
1993 Australian federal election: Fisher
Party	Candidate	Votes	%	±%
Labor	Ian Burgett	25,638	35.78	−2.25
Liberal	Peter Slipper	24,195	33.76	+9.78
National	Winston Johnston	10,497	14.65	−10.21
Independent	Chris Savage	4,758	6.64	+6.64
Confederate Action	Jeff Johnson	2,315	3.23	+3.23
Democrats	Digby Jakeman	2,170	3.03	−9.20
Greens	Chris Gwin	1,824	2.55	+2.55
Indigenous Peoples	Sam Watson	266	0.37	+0.37
Total formal votes		71,663	97.68	−0.29
Informal votes		1,704	2.32	+0.29
Turnout		73,367	95.81	
Two-party-preferred result
Liberal	Peter Slipper	39,650	55.36	+2.21
Labor	Ian Burgett	31,976	44.64	−2.21
Liberal hold		Swing	+2.21	

==== 1990 ====
1990 Australian federal election: Fisher
Party	Candidate	Votes	%	±%
Labor	Michael Lavarch	35,004	42.8	−1.9
Liberal	Tony Holmes	21,225	26.0	+13.8
National	Brian Sheahan	14,490	17.7	−18.6
Democrats	Glen Spicer	10,981	13.4	+6.6
Total formal votes		81,700	98.0	
Informal votes		1,655	2.0	
Turnout		83,355	95.9	
Two-party-preferred result
Labor	Michael Lavarch	42,401	52.0	+1.5
Liberal	Tony Holmes	39,136	48.0	+48.0
Labor hold		Swing	+1.5	

=== Elections in the 1980s ===
==== 1987 ====
1987 Australian federal election: Fisher
Party	Candidate	Votes	%	±%
Labor	Michael Lavarch	30,181	44.7	+2.3
National	Peter Slipper	24,522	36.3	−0.1
Liberal	Ian Mutch	8,208	12.2	−2.2
Democrats	Glen Spicer	4,597	6.8	−0.1
Total formal votes		67,508	96.7	
Informal votes		2,326	3.3	
Turnout		69,834	93.5	
Two-party-preferred result
Labor	Michael Lavarch	34,097	50.5	+2.8
National	Peter Slipper	33,394	49.5	−2.8
Labor gain from National		Swing	+2.8	

==== 1984 ====
1984 Australian federal election: Fisher
Party	Candidate	Votes	%	±%
Labor	Garth Head	23,554	42.4	+0.7
National	Peter Slipper	20,214	36.4	+0.0
Liberal	Lionel Kilner	7,998	14.4	−0.1
Democrats	Kent Farrell	3,807	6.9	−0.4
Total formal votes		55,573	95.1	
Informal votes		2,889	4.9	
Turnout		58,462	94.6	
Two-party-preferred result
National	Peter Slipper	29,061	52.3	−1.3
Labor	Garth Head	26,505	47.7	+1.3
National hold		Swing	−1.3	

==== 1983 ====
1983 Australian federal election: Fisher
Party	Candidate	Votes	%	±%
National	Evan Adermann	36,848	39.9	−13.4
Labor	Sol Theo	35,220	38.2	+3.4
Liberal	Dennis Caswell	13,414	14.5	+14.5
Democrats	Garry Somerville	6,764	7.3	−0.8
Total formal votes		92,246	99.0	
Informal votes		960	1.0	
Turnout		93,206	93.2	
Two-party-preferred result
National	Evan Adermann	52,691	57.1	−1.8
Labor	Sol Theo	39,555	42.9	+1.8
National hold		Swing	−1.8	

==== 1980 ====
1980 Australian federal election: Fisher
Party	Candidate	Votes	%	±%
National Country	Evan Adermann	41,167	53.3	−6.3
Labor	Fay Price	26,865	34.8	+5.7
Democrats	Gavin Black	6,250	8.1	−1.7
Independent	Gail Perry	2,134	2.8	+2.8
Progress	Rodney Jeanneret	848	1.1	−0.5
Total formal votes		77,264	97.9	
Informal votes		1,653	2.1	
Turnout		78,917	94.8	
Two-party-preferred result
National Country	Evan Adermann		58.9	−7.0
Labor	Fay Price		41.1	+7.0
National Country hold		Swing	−7.0	

=== Elections in the 1970s ===
==== 1977 ====
1977 Australian federal election: Fisher
Party	Candidate	Votes	%	±%
National Country	Evan Adermann	37,247	59.6	−6.4
Labor	Fay Price	18,187	29.1	−1.9
Democrats	Gillian Newman	6,110	9.8	+9.8
Progress	Gregory Gaffney	983	1.6	−1.4
Total formal votes		62,527	98.6	
Informal votes		861	1.4	
Turnout		63,388	95.7	
Two-party-preferred result
National Country	Evan Adermann		65.9	−2.5
Labor	Fay Price		34.1	+2.5
National Country hold		Swing	−2.5	

==== 1975 ====
1975 Australian federal election: Fisher
Party	Candidate	Votes	%	±%
National Country	Evan Adermann	49,850	70.6	+1.8
Labor	Ivan Guy	18,757	26.5	−4.8
Workers	Dennis Marshall	2,110	3.0	−1.7
Total formal votes		70,717	98.8	
Informal votes		854	1.2	
Turnout		71,571	96.1	
Two-party-preferred result
National Country	Evan Adermann		72.9	+4.2
Labor	Ivan Guy		27.1	−4.2
National Country hold		Swing	+4.2	

==== 1974 ====
1974 Australian federal election: Fisher
Party	Candidate	Votes	%	±%
Country	Evan Adermann	44,968	68.7	+18.6
Labor	Hamish Linacre	20,472	31.3	−4.4
Total formal votes		65,440	98.6	
Informal votes		923	1.4	
Turnout		66,363	96.4	
Country hold		Swing	+6.3	

==== 1972 ====
1972 Australian federal election: Fisher
Party	Candidate	Votes	%	±%
Country	Evan Adermann	28,356	50.1	−8.8
Labor	Hamish Linacre	20,183	35.7	+0.1
Liberal	John Plowman	5,494	9.7	+9.7
Democratic Labor	Robert Barron	2,569	4.5	−1.0
Total formal votes		56,602	98.4	
Informal votes		941	1.6	
Turnout		57,543	96.3	
Two-party-preferred result
Country	Evan Adermann		62.4	−0.9
Labor	Hamish Linacre		37.6	+0.9
Country hold		Swing	−0.9	

=== Elections in the 1960s ===
==== 1969 ====
1969 Australian federal election: Fisher
Party	Candidate	Votes	%	±%
Country	Charles Adermann	30,581	58.9	−2.4
Labor	Ian Budge	18,509	35.6	+3.1
Democratic Labor	Robert Barron	2,854	5.5	−0.7
Total formal votes		51,944	98.9	
Informal votes		564	1.1	
Turnout		52,508	96.3	
Two-party-preferred result
Country	Charles Adermann		63.3	−3.0
Labor	Ian Budge		36.7	+3.0
Country hold		Swing	−3.0	

==== 1966 ====
1966 Australian federal election: Fisher
Party	Candidate	Votes	%	±%
Country	Charles Adermann	29,855	66.2	+2.2
Labor	Alfred Walker	12,445	27.6	−4.7
Democratic Labor	Robert Barron	2,814	6.2	+2.6
Total formal votes		45,114	98.4	
Informal votes		721	1.6	
Turnout		45,835	96.5	
Two-party-preferred result
Country	Charles Adermann		71.2	+4.3
Labor	Alfred Walker		38.8	−4.3
Country hold		Swing	+4.3	

==== 1963 ====
1963 Australian federal election: Fisher
Party	Candidate	Votes	%	±%
Country	Charles Adermann	27,512	64.0	+8.1
Labor	William Weir	13,882	32.3	−3.5
Democratic Labor	Geoffrey Traill	1,567	3.6	−4.7
Total formal votes		42,961	98.1	
Informal votes		838	1.9	
Turnout		43,799	96.6	
Two-party-preferred result
Country	Charles Adermann		66.9	+4.4
Labor	William Weir		33.1	−4.4
Country hold		Swing	+4.4	

==== 1961 ====
1961 Australian federal election: Fisher
Party	Candidate	Votes	%	±%
Country	Charles Adermann	23,478	55.9	−10.2
Labor	William Weir	15,065	35.8	+10.4
Queensland Labor	John Newman	3,490	8.3	−0.2
Total formal votes		42,033	98.4	
Informal votes		698	1.6	
Turnout		42,731	96.4	
Two-party-preferred result
Country	Charles Adermann		62.5	−10.4
Labor	William Weir		37.5	+10.4
Country hold		Swing	−10.4	

=== Elections in the 1950s ===
==== 1958 ====
1958 Australian federal election: Fisher
Party	Candidate	Votes	%	±%
Country	Charles Adermann	26,953	66.1	−33.9
Labor	William Weir	10,337	25.4	+25.4
Queensland Labor	James Humphries	3,465	8.5	+8.5
Total formal votes		40,755	98.2	
Informal votes		741	1.8	
Turnout		41,496	96.3	
Two-party-preferred result
Country	Charles Adermann		72.9	−27.1
Labor	William Weir		27.1	+27.1
Country hold		Swing	−27.1	

==== 1955 ====
1955 Australian federal election: Fisher
Party	Candidate	Votes	%	±%
Country	Charles Adermann	unopposed		
Country hold		Swing		

==== 1954 ====
1954 Australian federal election: Fisher
Party	Candidate	Votes	%	±%
Country	Charles Adermann	29,202	69.6	−3.3
Labor	Sydney Campbell	12,774	30.4	+3.3
Total formal votes		41,976	99.2	
Informal votes		357	0.8	
Turnout		42,333	97.3	
Country hold		Swing	−3.3	

==== 1951 ====
1951 Australian federal election: Fisher
Party	Candidate	Votes	%	±%
Country	Charles Adermann	29,417	72.9	+6.4
Labor	Geoffrey Arnell	10,952	27.1	+2.2
Total formal votes		40,369	98.6	
Informal votes		575	1.4	
Turnout		40,944	96.9	
Country hold		Swing	+2.2	

=== Elections in the 1940s ===
==== 1949 ====
1949 Australian federal election: Fisher
Party	Candidate	Votes	%	±%
Country	Charles Adermann	26,630	66.5	+5.3
Labor	Edmund Roberts	9,980	24.9	−2.2
Independent	Norman Logan	3,419	8.5	+8.5
Total formal votes		40,029	98.9	
Informal votes		453	1.1	
Turnout		40,482	94.9	
Two-party-preferred result
Country	Charles Adermann		70.7	+4.1
Labor	Edmund Roberts		29.3	−4.1
Country notional hold		Swing	+4.1	
