= Fairfax in the 2013 Australian federal election =

2013 Australian federal election (Fairfax)
- 7 September 2013

Division of Fairfax (Qld) in the House of Representatives
- Registered: 95,411
- Turnout: 93.41% (▲0.63)
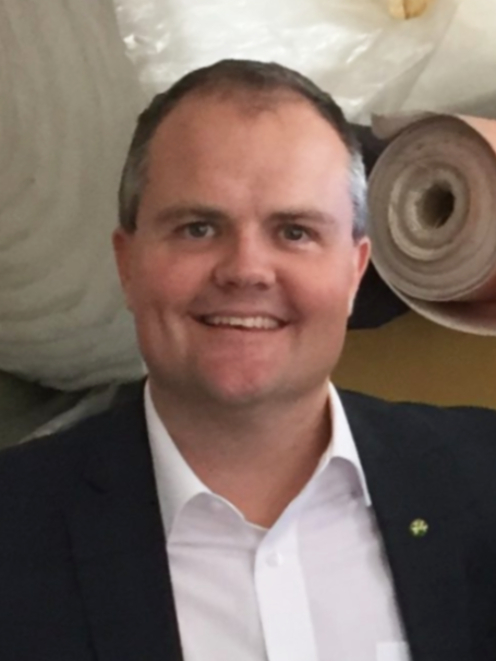

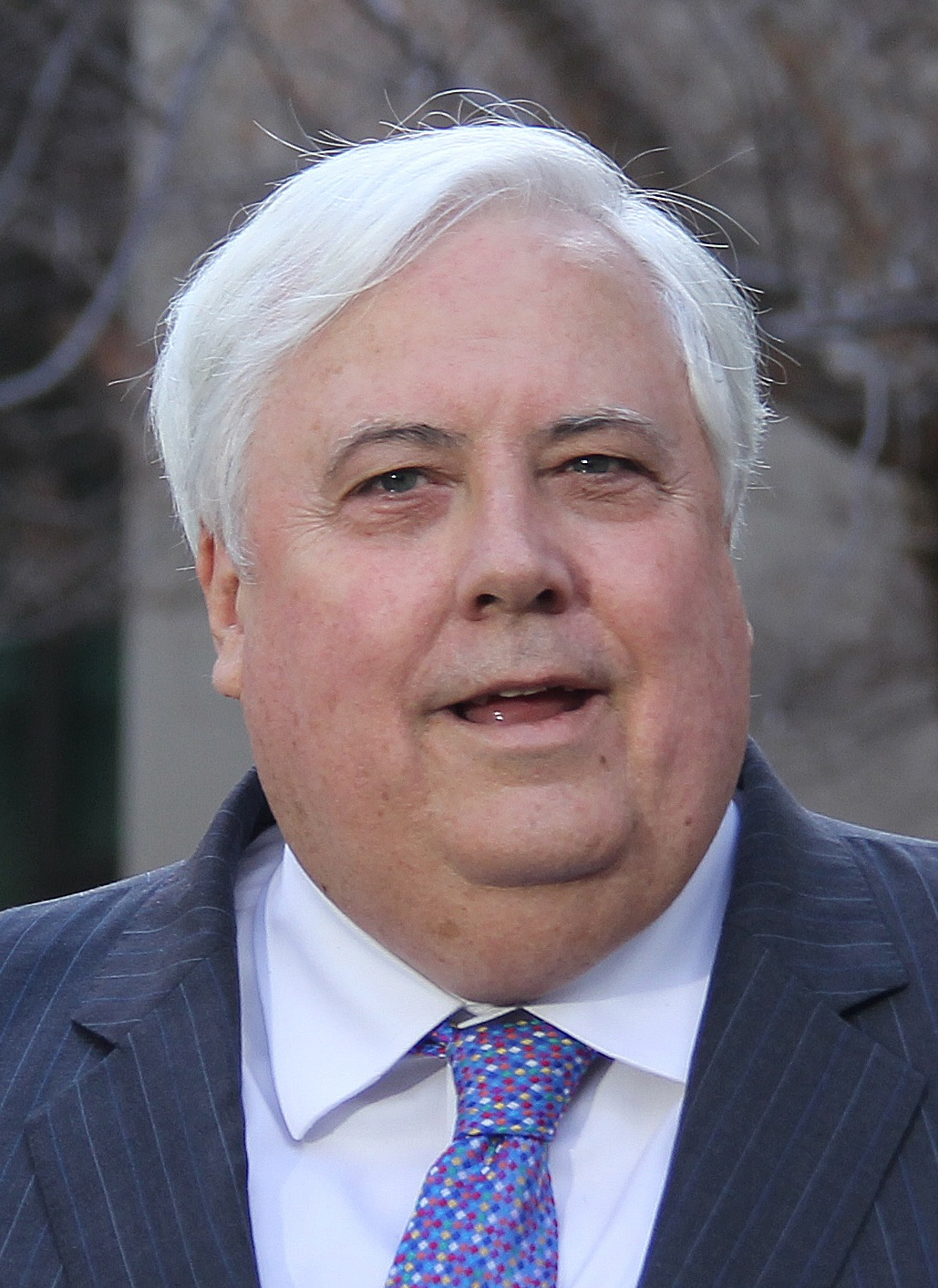

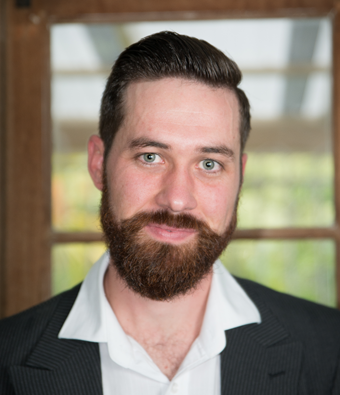
	First party	Second party
Candidate	Ted O'Brien	Clive Palmer
Party	Liberal National	Palmer United
Primary vote	34,959	22,409
Percentage	41.32%	26.49%
Swing	▼8.13	▲26.49
TCP	49.97%	50.03%
TCP swing	▼7.03	▲50.03
	Third party	Fourth party
Candidate	Elaine Hughes	David Knobel
Party	Labor	Greens
Primary vote	15,429	7,046
Percentage	18.24%	8.33%
Swing	▼9.07	▼9.67
MP before election
Alex Somlyay
Liberal National
Elected MP
Clive Palmer
Palmer United

An election in the Queensland electorate of Fairfax took place on 7 September 2013 as part of the 2013 Australian federal election. Incumbent Liberal National Party (LNP) MP Alex Somlyay did not seek re-election.

In an upset victory, billionaire Clive Palmer – contesting as the leader of his newly-formed Palmer United Party (PUP) – defeated LNP candidate Ted O'Brien by a margin of 53 votes in the two-candidate-preferred (TCP) count. The result took almost eight weeks to be confirmed, with the Australian Electoral Commission (AEC) conducting the longest recount in federal election history.

== Background ==
Alex Somlyay had held Fairfax for the Liberal Party since 1990, when he defeated the National Party following the retirement of incumbent member Evan Adermann. His hold on the seat had only been seriously challenged twice – the first time in 1998, when there was a 13.25% TCP swing against him, and the other in 2007, when there was a 9.4% TCP swing.

Following the 2010 federal election, Somlyay confirmed his plans to retire from parliament in 2013. Although there was an expectation that LNP campaign director James McGrath would contest preselection for Fairfax, he instead sought to run as the candidate for the neighbouring seat of Fisher. After that was unsuccessful, McGrath contested preselection for a position on the LNP's Senate ticket, which he won. In November 2012, businessman Ted O'Brien won the LNP's preselection for Fairfax, defeating former national rugby union team coach John Connolly.

In April 2013, billionaire and former LNP life member Clive Palmer formed the Palmer United Party (PUP) and announced he would contest Fairfax.

== Candidates ==
Candidates are listed in the order they appeared on the ballot.

Party	Candidate	Background
One Nation	Mike Holt	CEO of Restore Australia
Independent	Trudy Byrnes	Business consultant
Palmer United	Clive Palmer	Businessman and Palmer United Party founder
Liberal National	Ted O'Brien	Liberal candidate for Brisbane in 2007
Family First	Angela Meyer	Piano training business owner
Labor	Elaine Hughes	Lifeline crisis line supervisor
Greens	David Knobel	Community worker
Katter's Australian	Ray Sawyer	Dance school operator

== Campaign ==
The Family First Party recommended preferencing Labor above the LNP because of the issue of same-sex marriage, which Labor candidate Elaine Hughes indicated her opposition to.

Prior to the election, The Tally Room predicted that O'Brien "should have no trouble defeating Labor, and despite Clive Palmer's obnoxious claims, there is no evidence that Palmer is a serious threat to the LNP's hold on the seat".

No electorate opinion polling for Fairfax was published, although Roy Morgan Research said it predicted Palmer "could" win the seat. An exit poll released by Ten News at 4pm AEST on election day showed the PUP winning 9.5% of the vote in Queensland.

== Results ==
2013 Australian federal election: Fairfax
Party	Candidate	Votes	%	±%
Liberal National	Ted O'Brien	34,959	41.32	−8.13
Palmer United	Clive Palmer	22,409	26.49	+26.49
Labor	Elaine Hughes	15,429	18.24	−9.07
Greens	David Knobel	7,046	8.33	−9.67
Katter's Australian	Ray Sawyer	1,623	1.92	+1.92
Family First	Angela Meyer	1,416	1.67	−3.57
Independent	Trudy Byrnes	1,016	1.20	+1.20
One Nation	Mike Holt	709	0.84	+0.84
Total formal votes		84,607	94.88	−0.09
Informal votes		4,569	5.12	+0.09
Turnout		89,176	93.41	+0.63
Notional two-party-preferred count
Liberal National	Ted O'Brien	52,184	61.68	+4.73
Labor	Elaine Hughes	32,423	38.32	−4.73
Two-candidate-preferred result
Palmer United	Clive Palmer	42,330	50.03	+50.03
Liberal National	Ted O'Brien	42,277	49.97	−7.03
Palmer United gain from Liberal National				

== Aftermath ==
=== Election night ===
The indicative two-candidate-preferred count provided by the Australian Electoral Commission (AEC) on election night was between the LNP and Labor. By 8:10pm AEST, ABC election analyst Antony Green said the count would instead be between the LNP and the PUP. Palmer said he expected his party to win Fairfax and Fisher.

=== Initial count ===
After the AEC realigned the TCP count, Palmer emerged with a narrow lead over O'Brien. It was also revealed that a sorting error during election night meant 760 votes were recorded as being from the Buderim polling booth, instead of Coolum Beach, leading to Palmer seeking an injunction to stop counting. His application was rejected by the Federal Court of Australia on 17 September 2013. Palmer also stated that despite leading during the count, he would "be highly surprised if I won".

On 21 September 2013, the AEC declared Palmer had won Fairfax by a margin of 36 votes. After an automatic recount, which still resulted in a margin under 100 votes, a full recount was triggered.

=== Full recount ===
The full recount began on 3 October 2013. Around 20,000 votes were recounted after five days, but more than half of those were challenged by scrutineers. During the count, Palmer increased his lead to as high as 67 votes. According to the AEC spokesperson, the "vast majority" of challenges had come from PUP representatives. By the end of the recounting, 50,099 of the 89,176 ballots were challenged, with 38,644 of those referred to the AEC for a decision.

On 31 October 2013, the AEC declared Palmer had won the seat by a margin of 53 votes following the recount.

== See also ==
- Results of the 2013 Australian federal election in Queensland
- Electoral results for the Division of Fairfax
