= Electoral results for the Division of Fairfax =

Australian division election results

This is a list of electoral results for the Division of Fairfax in Australian federal elections from the division's creation in 1984 until the present.

== Members ==
Member	Party	Term
Evan Adermann	National	1984–1990
Alex Somlyay	Liberal	1990–2010
Alex Somlyay	Liberal National	2010–2013
Clive Palmer	Palmer United	2013–2016
Ted O'Brien	Liberal National	2016–present

== Election results ==
=== Elections in the 2020s ===
==== 2025 ====
2025 Australian federal election: Fairfax
Party	Candidate	Votes	%	±%
One Nation	Beatrice Marsh			
Independent	Francine Wiig			
Family First	Rhys Sanderson			
Greens	Sue Etheridge			
Labor	Naomi McQueen			
Independent	Paul McKeown			
Liberal National	Ted O'Brien			
Trumpet of Patriots	Gregory Ryzy			
Total formal votes				
Informal votes				
Turnout				

==== 2022 ====
2022 Australian federal election: Fairfax
Party	Candidate	Votes	%	±%
Liberal National	Ted O'Brien	46,551	44.91	−4.71
Labor	Sue Ferguson	22,662	21.86	+0.38
Greens	Sue Etheridge	13,862	13.37	+0.78
One Nation	Nikki Civitarese	6,798	6.56	−1.29
United Australia	Lisa Khoury	6,132	5.92	+2.86
Animal Justice	Tash Poole	2,182	2.10	+2.10
Informed Medical Options	Wendy Hazelton	1,997	1.93	+1.93
Independent	Barry Smith	1,423	1.37	+1.37
Great Australian	Craig White	1,319	1.27	+1.27
Independent	Sinim Australie	733	0.71	−0.64
Total formal votes		103,659	94.47	+0.90
Informal votes		6,066	5.53	−0.90
Turnout		109,725	88.99	−2.45
Two-party-preferred result
Liberal National	Ted O'Brien	61,108	58.95	−4.49
Labor	Sue Ferguson	42,551	41.05	+4.49
Liberal National hold		Swing	−4.49	

Alluvial diagram for preference flows in the seat of Fairfax in the 2022 federal election. indicates at what stage the winning candidate had over 50% of the votes and was declared the winner.

=== Elections in the 2010s ===
==== 2019 ====
2019 Australian federal election: Fairfax
Party	Candidate	Votes	%	±%
Liberal National	Ted O'Brien	48,451	49.62	+1.12
Labor	Julie McGlone	20,976	21.48	+0.85
Greens	Sue Etheridge	12,291	12.59	−0.07
One Nation	Paul Henselin	7,661	7.85	−1.83
United Australia	Kylie Cowling	2,987	3.06	+3.06
Conservative National	Jake Ryan	1,502	1.54	+1.54
Sustainable Australia	Richard Belcher	1,410	1.44	+1.44
Independent	Sinim Australie	1,318	1.35	+1.35
Liberal Democrats	Bertrand Cadart	1,044	1.07	+1.07
Total formal votes		97,640	93.57	−0.19
Informal votes		6,715	6.43	+0.19
Turnout		104,355	91.44	+0.62
Two-party-preferred result
Liberal National	Ted O'Brien	61,944	63.44	+2.57
Labor	Julie McGlone	35,696	36.56	−2.57
Liberal National hold		Swing	+2.57	

==== 2016 ====
2016 Australian federal election: Fairfax
Party	Candidate	Votes	%	±%
Liberal National	Ted O'Brien	44,787	48.44	+7.12
Labor	Scott Anderson	19,054	20.61	+2.37
Greens	Susan Etheridge	11,672	12.62	+4.29
One Nation	Robert Pasquali	9,006	9.74	+8.90
Independent	Keith Campbell	2,886	3.12	+3.12
Family First	David Rees	2,449	2.65	+0.98
Independent	Robert Dickson	1,985	2.15	+2.15
Online Direct Democracy	Kris Bullen	624	0.67	+0.67
Total formal votes		92,463	93.77	−1.11
Informal votes		6,146	6.23	+1.11
Turnout		98,609	91.10	−2.29
Two-party-preferred result
Liberal National	Ted O'Brien	56,299	60.89	+10.92
Labor	Scott Anderson	36,164	39.11	+39.11
Liberal National gain from Palmer United		Swing	+10.92	

==== 2013 ====
2013 Australian federal election: Fairfax
Party	Candidate	Votes	%	±%
Liberal National	Ted O'Brien	34,959	41.32	−8.13
Palmer United	Clive Palmer	22,409	26.49	+26.49
Labor	Elaine Hughes	15,429	18.24	−9.07
Greens	David Knobel	7,046	8.33	−9.67
Katter's Australian	Ray Sawyer	1,623	1.92	+1.92
Family First	Angela Meyer	1,416	1.67	−3.57
Independent	Trudy Byrnes	1,016	1.20	+1.20
One Nation	Mike Holt	709	0.84	+0.84
Total formal votes		84,607	94.88	−0.09
Informal votes		4,569	5.12	+0.09
Turnout		89,176	93.41	+0.63
Notional two-party-preferred count
Liberal National	Ted O'Brien	52,184	61.68	+4.73
Labor	Elaine Hughes	32,423	38.32	−4.73
Two-candidate-preferred result
Palmer United	Clive Palmer	42,330	50.03	+50.03
Liberal National	Ted O'Brien	42,277	49.97	−7.03
Palmer United gain from Liberal National		Swing	N/A	

==== 2010 ====
2010 Australian federal election: Fairfax
Party	Candidate	Votes	%	±%
Liberal National	Alex Somlyay	39,102	49.45	+2.72
Labor	Dan McIntyre	21,589	27.31	−9.07
Greens	Narelle McCarthy	14,228	18.00	+9.31
Family First	Ron Hunt	4,147	5.24	+1.32
Total formal votes		79,066	94.97	−1.64
Informal votes		4,186	5.03	+1.64
Turnout		83,252	92.77	−0.35
Two-party-preferred result
Liberal National	Alex Somlyay	45,032	56.95	+3.98
Labor	Dan McIntyre	34,034	43.05	−3.98
Liberal National hold		Swing	+3.98	

=== Elections in the 2000s ===
==== 2007 ====
2007 Australian federal election: Fairfax
Party	Candidate	Votes	%	±%
Liberal	Alex Somlyay	38,470	46.82	−6.90
Labor	Debbie Blumel	29,960	36.46	+9.22
Greens	Dave Norris	7,011	8.53	+0.36
Family First	Lisa Woods	3,287	4.00	−1.01
Independent	Max Phillips	1,300	1.58	+1.58
One Nation	Kevin Savage	861	1.05	−2.07
Democrats	Janette Hashemi	764	0.93	−1.25
Citizens Electoral Council	Kev Watt	514	0.63	+0.42
Total formal votes		82,167	96.65	+1.72
Informal votes		2,852	3.35	−1.72
Turnout		85,019	94.22	−0.51
Two-party-preferred result
Liberal	Alex Somlyay	43,558	53.01	−9.40
Labor	Debbie Blumel	38,609	46.99	+9.40
Liberal hold		Swing	−9.40	

==== 2004 ====
2004 Australian federal election: Fairfax
Party	Candidate	Votes	%	±%
Liberal	Alex Somlyay	39,075	52.30	+4.38
Labor	Ivan Molloy	20,289	27.15	+1.69
Greens	David Norris	7,536	10.09	+4.61
Family First	Paula Hunt	3,390	4.54	+4.54
One Nation	Patrick Rozanski	2,317	3.10	−3.94
Democrats	Debbie Campbell	1,896	2.54	−2.40
Citizens Electoral Council	Kev Watt	216	0.29	+0.29
Total formal votes		74,719	94.74	−0.95
Informal votes		4,145	5.26	+0.95
Turnout		78,864	93.44	+1.03
Two-party-preferred result
Liberal	Alex Somlyay	45,452	60.83	+1.65
Labor	Ivan Molloy	29,267	39.17	−1.65
Liberal hold		Swing	+1.65	

==== 2001 ====
2001 Australian federal election: Fairfax
Party	Candidate	Votes	%	±%
Liberal	Alex Somlyay	35,868	47.05	+11.03
Labor	John Henderson	19,101	25.06	−3.64
Independent	Shane Paulger	7,519	9.86	+9.86
One Nation	Jim Mackellar	6,281	8.24	−9.51
Greens	Joy Ringrose	3,791	4.97	+1.50
Democrats	Karen Jackson	3,670	4.81	+0.80
Total formal votes		76,230	95.73	−0.51
Informal votes		3,399	4.27	+0.51
Turnout		79,629	95.36	
Two-party-preferred result
Liberal	Alex Somlyay	45,135	59.21	+4.85
Labor	John Henderson	31,095	40.79	−4.85
Liberal hold		Swing	+4.85	

=== Elections in the 1990s ===
==== 1998 ====
1998 Australian federal election: Fairfax
Party	Candidate	Votes	%	±%
Liberal	Alex Somlyay	24,709	36.03	−7.83
Labor	John Henderson	19,679	28.69	+4.14
One Nation	Fraser Anning	12,171	17.75	+17.75
National	Lindsay Horswood	4,692	6.84	−10.23
Democrats	John Ryan	2,754	4.02	−4.14
Greens	Peter Bakhash	2,381	3.47	−0.85
Christian Democrats	Harry Cook	1,279	1.86	+1.86
Independent	Mike Harper	921	1.34	+1.34
Total formal votes		68,586	96.24	−1.37
Informal votes		2,679	3.76	+1.37
Turnout		71,265	93.71	−0.46
Two-party-preferred result
Liberal	Alex Somlyay	37,286	54.36	−13.25
Labor	John Henderson	31,300	45.64	+13.25
Liberal hold		Swing	−13.25	

==== 1996 ====
1996 Australian federal election: Fairfax
Party	Candidate	Votes	%	±%
Liberal	Alex Somlyay	44,994	62.14	+22.34
Labor	Peter Marconi	17,355	23.97	−6.65
Democrats	Elizabeth Oss-Emer	5,808	8.02	+3.32
Greens	John Fitzgerald	3,868	5.34	+1.25
Indigenous Peoples	Colin Hicks	384	0.53	+0.53
Total formal votes		72,409	97.76	+0.23
Informal votes		1,659	2.24	−0.23
Turnout		74,068	94.16	−0.69
Two-party-preferred result
Liberal	Alex Somlyay	49,109	68.09	+8.05
Labor	Peter Marconi	23,010	31.91	−8.05
Liberal hold		Swing	+8.05	

==== 1993 ====
1993 Australian federal election: Fairfax
Party	Candidate	Votes	%	±%
Liberal	Alex Somlyay	28,686	40.18	+15.38
Labor	Kerry Orton	22,022	30.84	−1.44
National	Gordon Simpson	10,382	14.54	−12.91
Democrats	Elizabeth Oss-Emer	3,313	4.64	−8.95
Greens	Peter Parnell	2,858	4.00	+4.00
Confederate Action	Santo Ferraro	1,646	2.31	+2.31
Independent	John Henderson	1,567	2.19	+2.19
Natural Law	Keith Valentine	924	1.29	+1.29
Total formal votes		71,398	97.47	−0.52
Informal votes		1,850	2.53	+0.52
Turnout		73,248	94.85	
Two-party-preferred result
Liberal	Alex Somlyay	42,662	59.80	+2.02
Labor	Kerry Orton	28,683	40.20	−2.02
Liberal hold		Swing	+2.02	

==== 1990 ====
1990 Australian federal election: Fairfax
Party	Candidate	Votes	%	±%
Labor	Beryl Muspratt	26,017	32.8	−2.4
National	John Stone	20,928	26.4	−13.4
Liberal	Alex Somlyay	20,395	25.7	+8.5
Democrats	Bob Borsellino	10,439	13.2	+5.5
Conservative	Sheila Adams	1,528	1.9	+1.9
Total formal votes		79,307	98.0	
Informal votes		1,632	2.0	
Turnout		80,939	94.8	
Two-party-preferred result
Liberal	Alex Somlyay	45,449	57.5	+57.5
Labor	Beryl Muspratt	33,634	42.5	−0.2
Liberal gain from National		Swing	+0.2	

=== Elections in the 1980s ===
==== 1987 ====
1987 Australian federal election: Fairfax
Party	Candidate	Votes	%	±%
National	Evan Adermann	24,817	39.8	−5.4
Labor	Alison Smith	21,953	35.2	+1.5
Liberal	Joy Brannelly	10,733	17.2	+3.0
Democrats	Brian Stockwell	4,786	7.7	+0.8
Total formal votes		62,289	96.8	
Informal votes		2,085	3.2	
Turnout		64,374	92.0	
Two-party-preferred result
National	Evan Adermann	35,713	57.3	−3.3
Labor	Alison Smith	26,565	42.7	+3.3
National hold		Swing	−3.3	

==== 1984 ====
1984 Australian federal election: Fairfax
Party	Candidate	Votes	%	±%
National	Evan Adermann	23,593	45.2	−1.9
Labor	Peter Shooter	17,607	33.7	−0.2
Liberal	Terry Welch	7,402	14.2	+2.8
Democrats	Bob Borsellino	3,608	6.9	+0.0
Total formal votes		52,210	95.0	
Informal votes		2,728	5.0	
Turnout		54,938	92.5	
Two-party-preferred result
National	Evan Adermann	31,642	60.6	−0.4
Labor	Peter Shooter	20,564	39.4	+0.4
National notional hold		Swing	−0.4	
