= Caroline Hutchinson =

Australian radio host

Caroline Marcelle Hutchinson (née Terry; born 12 August 1968) is an Australian radio announcer and journalist.

Hutchinson was born at Margaret River in Western Australia to Jonathan Margrave Terry and Aileen Mary Howitt. In 1988 she became a television reporter for GWN; on 4 February 1989 she married John Hutchinson. In 1991 she left Western Australia for Victoria, where she was radio newsreader for Sun FM in Shepparton from 1992 to 1993. A reporter for WIN News from 1993 to 1995, she was the host of "Truck Radio" on the Australian Radio Network Satellite Service (based in Sydney) from 1995 to 1998, when she moved to the Sunshine Coast to become breakfast announcer on 92.7 MIX FM. Hutchinson also contributed columns for the Sunshine Coast Daily from 1998 to 2006.

At the 2007 federal election, Hutchinson ran for the seat of Fisher as an independent against Liberal MP Peter Slipper. She received 13.3% of the vote.

In October 2024, Hutchinson announced that after 26 years and more than 5000 breakfast shows, she would be leaving her Mix FM role. Her final show was on 20 December 2024.
