= Electoral results for the Division of Longman =

Australian division election results

This is a list of electoral results for the Division of Longman in Australian federal elections from the division's creation in 1996 until the present.

== Members ==
Member	Party	Term
Mal Brough	Liberal	1996–2007
Jon Sullivan	Labor	2007–2010
Wyatt Roy	Liberal National	2010–2016
Susan Lamb	Labor	2016–2019
Terry Young	Liberal National	2019–present

== Election results ==
=== Elections in the 2020s ===
==== 2025 ====
2025 Australian federal election: Longman
Party	Candidate	Votes	%	±%
Liberal National	Terry Young	43,960	36.05	−2.12
Labor	Rhiannyn Douglas	43,238	35.46	+3.96
One Nation	Peter McCasker	12,062	9.89	+1.64
Greens	Gabrielle Unverzagt	12,014	9.85	+2.62
Trumpet of Patriots	Benjamin Wood	5,985	4.91	+4.91
Family First	Malachi Hearne (disendorsed)	4,670	3.83	+3.83
Total formal votes		121,929	96.06	+1.05
Informal votes		4,998	3.94	−1.05
Turnout		126,927	88.92	+0.75
Two-party-preferred result
Liberal National	Terry Young	61,099	50.11	−2.97
Labor	Rhiannyn Douglas	60,830	49.89	+2.97
Liberal National hold		Swing	−2.97	

==== 2022 ====
2022 Australian federal election: Longman
Party	Candidate	Votes	%	±%
Liberal National	Terry Young	41,253	38.17	−0.42
Labor	Rebecca Fanning	34,036	31.50	−2.60
One Nation	Ross Taylor	8,917	8.25	−4.97
Greens	Earl Snijders	7,814	7.23	+0.52
Legalise Cannabis	Nigel Quinlan	6,025	5.58	+5.58
United Australia	Stefanie Sutherland	5,949	5.51	+2.15
Animal Justice	Paula Gilbard	2,060	1.91	+1.91
Liberal Democrats	Jens Lipponer	2,011	1.86	+1.86
Total formal votes		108,065	95.01	+0.85
Informal votes		5,677	4.99	−0.85
Turnout		113,742	88.17	−3.99
Two-party-preferred result
Liberal National	Terry Young	57,359	53.08	−0.20
Labor	Rebecca Fanning	50,706	46.92	+0.20
Liberal National hold		Swing	−0.20	

Alluvial diagram for preference flows in the seat of Longman in the 2022 federal election. indicates at what stage the winning candidate had over 50% of the votes and was declared the winner.

=== Elections in the 2010s ===
==== 2019 ====
2019 Australian federal election: Longman
Party	Candidate	Votes	%	±%
Liberal National	Terry Young	38,411	38.59	−0.42
Labor	Susan Lamb	33,949	34.10	−1.28
One Nation	Matthew Thomson	13,160	13.22	+3.80
Greens	Simone Dejun	6,684	6.71	+2.32
United Australia	Bailey Maher	3,344	3.36	+3.36
Conservative National	Dave Paulke	1,967	1.98	+1.98
Australia First	Peter Schuback	1,069	1.07	+1.07
Progressives	Jono Young	965	0.97	+0.97
Total formal votes		99,549	94.16	+2.69
Informal votes		6,173	5.84	−2.69
Turnout		105,722	92.16	+0.59
Two-party-preferred result
Liberal National	Terry Young	53,037	53.28	+4.07
Labor	Susan Lamb	46,512	46.72	−4.07
Liberal National gain from Labor		Swing	+4.07	

==== 2018 ====
Longman by-election: 28 July 2018
Party	Candidate	Votes	%	±%
Labor	Susan Lamb	35,203	39.84	+4.45
Liberal National	Trevor Ruthenberg	26,170	29.61	−9.40
One Nation	Matthew Stephen	14,061	15.91	+6.50
Greens	Gavin Behrens	4,264	4.83	+0.44
Independent	Jackie Perkins	2,379	2.69	+2.69
Liberal Democrats	Lloyd Russell	1,762	1.99	+1.99
Country	Blair Verrier	1,387	1.57	+1.57
Democratic Labour	Gregory Bell	1,043	1.18	+1.18
Science	James Noonan	970	1.10	+1.10
Australia First	Jim Saleam	709	0.80	+0.80
People's Party	John Reece	420	0.48	+0.48
Total formal votes		88,368	93.93	+2.46
Informal votes		5,707	6.07	−2.46
Turnout		94,075	84.26	−7.42
Two-party-preferred result
Labor	Susan Lamb	48,116	54.45	+3.66
Liberal National	Trevor Ruthenberg	40,252	45.55	−3.66
Labor hold		Swing	+3.66	

==== 2016 ====
2016 Australian federal election: Longman
Party	Candidate	Votes	%	±%
Liberal National	Wyatt Roy	34,359	39.01	−5.83
Labor	Susan Lamb	31,161	35.38	+4.73
One Nation	Michelle Pedersen	8,293	9.42	+9.42
Greens	Ian Bell	3,865	4.39	+0.45
Family First	Will Smith	3,002	3.41	+1.05
Drug Law Reform	Frances McDonald	2,677	3.04	+3.04
Katter's Australian	Brad Kennedy	1,597	1.81	−1.01
Independent	Greg Riddell	1,111	1.26	+1.26
Independent	Rob Law	945	1.07	+1.07
	Caleb Wells	830	0.94	−0.13
Arts	Stephen Beck	228	0.26	+0.26
Total formal votes		88,068	91.47	−3.46
Informal votes		8,217	8.53	+3.46
Turnout		96,285	91.68	−2.17
Two-party-preferred result
Labor	Susan Lamb	44,729	50.79	+7.71
Liberal National	Wyatt Roy	43,339	49.21	−7.71
Labor gain from Liberal National		Swing	+7.71	

==== 2013 ====
2013 Australian federal election: Longman
Party	Candidate	Votes	%	±%
Liberal National	Wyatt Roy	37,570	44.84	+1.09
Labor	Michael Caisley	25,683	30.65	−6.99
Palmer United	Clemens Van Der Weegen	10,714	12.79	+12.79
Greens	Helen Fairweather	3,304	3.94	−5.18
Katter's Australian	Brad Kennedy	2,364	2.82	+2.82
Family First	Will Smith	1,977	2.36	−1.89
Sex Party	Ayla Goeytes	1,283	1.53	+1.53
Independent	Caleb Wells	895	1.07	+1.07
Total formal votes		83,790	94.93	+2.22
Informal votes		4,473	5.07	−2.22
Turnout		88,263	93.85	+0.36
Two-party-preferred result
Liberal National	Wyatt Roy	47,691	56.92	+5.00
Labor	Michael Caisley	36,099	43.08	−5.00
Liberal National hold		Swing	+5.00	

==== 2010 ====
2010 Australian federal election: Longman
Party	Candidate	Votes	%	±%
Liberal National	Wyatt Roy	33,011	43.75	−1.17
Labor	Jon Sullivan	28,396	37.64	−8.04
Greens	Rod Blair	6,878	9.12	+4.64
Family First	Claire McErlane	3,206	4.25	+2.46
Independent	John Reece	1,042	1.38	+1.38
Independent	Bob Fox	872	1.16	+1.16
Independent	Michael van Boeckel	856	1.13	+1.13
Liberal Democrats	Joshua van Veen	671	0.89	+0.51
Democratic Labor	Andrew Jackson	518	0.69	+0.69
Total formal votes		75,450	92.71	−3.77
Informal votes		5,929	7.29	+3.77
Turnout		81,379	93.47	+0.19
Two-party-preferred result
Liberal National	Wyatt Roy	39,173	51.92	+3.79
Labor	Jon Sullivan	36,277	48.08	−3.79
Liberal National gain from Labor		Swing	+3.79	

=== Elections in the 2000s ===
==== 2007 ====
2007 Australian federal election: Longman
Party	Candidate	Votes	%	±%
Labor	Jon Sullivan	39,434	47.98	+10.92
Liberal	Mal Brough	36,009	43.82	−7.32
Greens	Paul Costin	3,486	4.24	+0.36
Family First	Peter Urquhart	1,525	1.86	−1.35
Democrats	Liz Oss-Emer	1,153	1.40	−0.29
Liberty & Democracy	Trent MacDonald	410	0.50	+0.50
Citizens Electoral Council	Dan Winniak	166	0.20	+0.20
Total formal votes		82,183	96.53	+2.18
Informal votes		2,950	3.47	−2.18
Turnout		85,133	94.79	−0.47
Two-party-preferred result
Labor	Jon Sullivan	44,026	53.57	+10.32
Liberal	Mal Brough	38,157	46.43	−10.32
Labor gain from Liberal		Swing	+10.32	

==== 2004 ====
2004 Australian federal election: Longman
Party	Candidate	Votes	%	±%
Liberal	Mal Brough	40,345	51.87	+6.64
Labor	Stephen Beckett	27,790	35.73	−1.42
Greens	Philip Kimmet	3,096	3.98	+1.00
One Nation	Susan Meredith	3,017	3.88	−4.49
Family First	Tom Lew	2,187	2.81	+2.81
Democrats	Jacqueline Kennedy	1,339	1.72	−2.18
Total formal votes		77,774	94.36	−0.29
Informal votes		4,646	5.64	+0.29
Turnout		82,420	94.50	+1.24
Two-party-preferred result
Liberal	Mal Brough	44,848	57.66	+5.14
Labor	Stephen Beckett	32,926	42.34	−5.14
Liberal hold		Swing	+5.14	

==== 2001 ====
2001 Australian federal election: Longman
Party	Candidate	Votes	%	±%
Liberal	Mal Brough	34,229	45.37	+6.44
Labor	Stephen Beckett	27,629	36.62	+1.86
One Nation	Bert Bowden	6,223	8.25	−9.90
Democrats	Bronwyn Patrick	2,992	3.97	−1.02
Greens	Eve Scopes	2,556	3.39	+0.23
Independent	Brian Hallam	1,665	2.21	+2.21
Citizens Electoral Council	Leslie Hardwick	148	0.20	+0.20
Total formal votes		75,442	94.73	−2.38
Informal votes		4,195	5.27	+2.38
Turnout		79,637	96.12	
Two-party-preferred result
Liberal	Mal Brough	39,774	52.72	+1.80
Labor	Stephen Beckett	35,668	47.28	−1.80
Liberal hold		Swing	+1.80	

=== Elections in the 1990s ===
==== 1998 ====
1998 Australian federal election: Longman
Party	Candidate	Votes	%	±%
Liberal	Mal Brough	27,161	38.93	−1.27
Labor	Ian Burgett	24,254	34.77	+2.62
One Nation	Gavin Badke	12,663	18.15	+18.15
Democrats	Paul Barnes	3,477	4.98	−2.53
Greens	John Langford	2,206	3.16	−0.11
Total formal votes		69,761	97.11	−0.12
Informal votes		2,076	2.89	+0.12
Turnout		71,837	94.66	−0.92
Two-party-preferred result
Liberal	Mal Brough	35,525	50.92	−8.98
Labor	Ian Burgett	34,236	49.08	+8.98
Liberal hold		Swing	−8.98	

==== 1996 ====
1996 Australian federal election: Longman
Party	Candidate	Votes	%	±%
Liberal	Mal Brough	27,704	38.74	+6.68
Labor	Pat Bonnice	21,943	30.69	−8.57
National	Thomas Bradley	12,611	17.64	+4.80
Democrats	Greg Hollis	5,276	7.38	+4.41
Greens	Jim Dimo	2,145	3.00	−0.54
Independent	Terence Madden	966	1.35	+1.35
One Australia	Geoffrey Abnett	673	0.94	+0.94
Indigenous Peoples	Norman Hegarty	187	0.26	+0.06
Total formal votes		71,505	97.33	−0.33
Informal votes		1,962	2.67	+0.33
Turnout		73,467	95.58	
Two-party-preferred result
Liberal	Mal Brough	43,894	61.59	+8.13
Labor	Pat Bonnice	27,374	38.41	−8.13
Liberal notional hold		Swing	+8.13	
