= Division of Fairfax =

Australian federal electoral division

Coordinates: 26.586°S 152.888°E

Fairfax Australian House of Representatives Division
- Interactive map of boundaries since the 2019 federal election
- Created: 1984
- MP: Ted O'Brien
- Party: Liberal Party (Note: Member of the Liberal National Party of Queensland sitting with the federal parliamentary Liberal Party.)
- Namesake: Ruth Fairfax
- Electors: 130,713 (2025)
- Area: 1,004 km^{2} (387.6 sq mi)
- Demographic: Rural
Electorates around Fairfax:
Wide Bay	Wide Bay	Wide Bay
Blair	Fairfax	Coral Sea
Fisher	Fisher	Fisher

The Division of Fairfax is an Australian electoral division in the state of Queensland. It comprises part of the Sunshine Coast, including the large towns of Maroochydore and Buderim.

Since 2016 its MP has been Ted O'Brien of the Liberal Party.

== Geography ==
Since 1984, federal electoral division boundaries in Australia have been determined at redistributions by a redistribution committee appointed by the Australian Electoral Commission. Redistributions occur for the boundaries of divisions in a particular state, and they occur every seven years, or sooner if a state's representation entitlement changes or when divisions of a state are malapportioned.

The Division of Fairfax is located in the Sunshine Coast region north of Brisbane and includes the towns of Coolum, Yaroomba, Marcoola, Mudjimba, Maroochydore, Buderim, Woombye, Bli Bli, Yandina, Nambour, Mapleton, Kenilworth and Eumundi.

== History ==
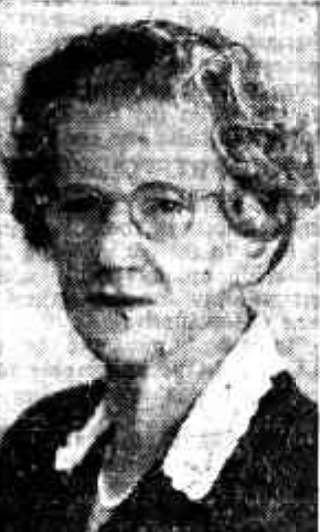
Ruth Fairfax, the division's namesake

The division was created in 1984 and is named after Ruth Fairfax, founder of the Country Women's Association.

While the Sunshine Coast is traditionally a conservative area, Fairfax is located in a particularly conservative portion of it, and so has always been held by a right-of-centre party. Originally a safe seat for the National Party, demographic change has made it equally safe for the Liberal Party.

The electorate came to national attention at the 2013 federal election, when Clive Palmer, the founder of the Palmer United Party, narrowly won it by 53 votes. Before then, the Coalition's hold on the seat had only been seriously threatened twice, in 1998 and 2007. At all other times, it was a safe, or fairly safe, Coalition seat.

Palmer did not run for re-election, and it was widely expected that the seat would revert to the merged Liberal National Party because, in 2013, the LNP would have retained it easily in a "traditional" two-party-preferred vote contest with Labor. As expected, Palmer's 2013 opponent, Ted O'Brien, won the seat resoundingly at the 2016 federal election and has held it without serious difficulty since.

== Members ==
Image	Member	Party	Term	Notes
	Evan Adermann (1927–2001)	Nationals	1 December 1984 – 19 February 1990	Previously held the Division of Fisher. Retired
	Alex Somlyay (1946–)	Liberal	24 March 1990 – 5 August 2013	Served as Minister under Howard. Retired
	Clive Palmer (1954–)	Palmer United	7 September 2013 – 9 May 2016	Retired
	Ted O'Brien (1974–)	Liberal	2 July 2016 – present	Incumbent

== Election results ==
2025 Australian federal election: Fairfax
Party	Candidate	Votes	%	±%
Liberal National	Ted O'Brien	42,075	37.89	−7.02
Labor	Naomi McQueen	27,607	24.86	+3.00
Independent	Francine Wiig	13,085	11.78	+11.78
Greens	Sue Etheridge	11,351	10.22	−3.15
One Nation	Beatrice Marsh	8,232	7.41	+0.85
Family First	Rhys Sanderson	3,816	3.44	+3.44
Trumpet of Patriots	Gregory Ryzy	3,063	2.76	+2.76
Independent	Paul McKeown	1,819	1.64	+1.64
Total formal votes		111,048	94.73	+0.26
Informal votes		6,180	5.27	−0.26
Turnout		117,228	89.72	+0.73
Two-party-preferred result
Liberal National	Ted O'Brien	59,110	53.23	−5.72
Labor	Naomi McQueen	51,938	46.77	+5.72
Liberal National hold		Swing	−5.72	
