= Andrew Wallace =

Australian politician (born 1968)

Andrew Wallace MP
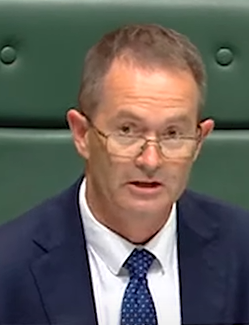
- Wallace in the Speaker's chair

31st Speaker of the Australian House of Representatives
- In office 23 November 2021 – 11 April 2022
- Deputy: Llew O'Brien
- Preceded by: Tony Smith
- Succeeded by: Milton Dick

Member of the Australian Parliament for Fisher
- Incumbent
- Assumed office 2 July 2016
- Preceded by: Mal Brough

Personal details
- Born: 23 April 1968 (age 58) Melbourne, Victoria, Australia
- Party: Liberal National Party of Queensland
- Spouse: Leonie
- Children: 4
- Education: Queensland University of Technology
- Profession: Builder; Barrister

Andrew Bruce Wallace (born 23 April 1968) is an Australian politician who served as the 31st Speaker of the House of Representatives from November 2021 to April 2022. He has been a member of the House of Representatives since the 2016 federal election, representing the Division of Fisher. He is a member of the Liberal National Party of Queensland and sits with the Liberal Party in parliament.

== Early life ==
Wallace was born in Melbourne. At the age of 19, he entered a Pallottine monastery in Victoria. He was asked to leave after less than a year when it was judged that he would not be able to fulfil his monastic vows of poverty, chastity and obedience. Dismissed by the rector, he was told, "there's many ways you can serve God, you don't have to be a priest."

His mother organised his apprenticeship as a carpenter, and Wallace eventually started his own building business. Wallace qualified as a barrister in 2000 after studying law at the Queensland University of Technology, subsequently practising in construction law for 16 years prior to his election to parliament.

== Politics ==
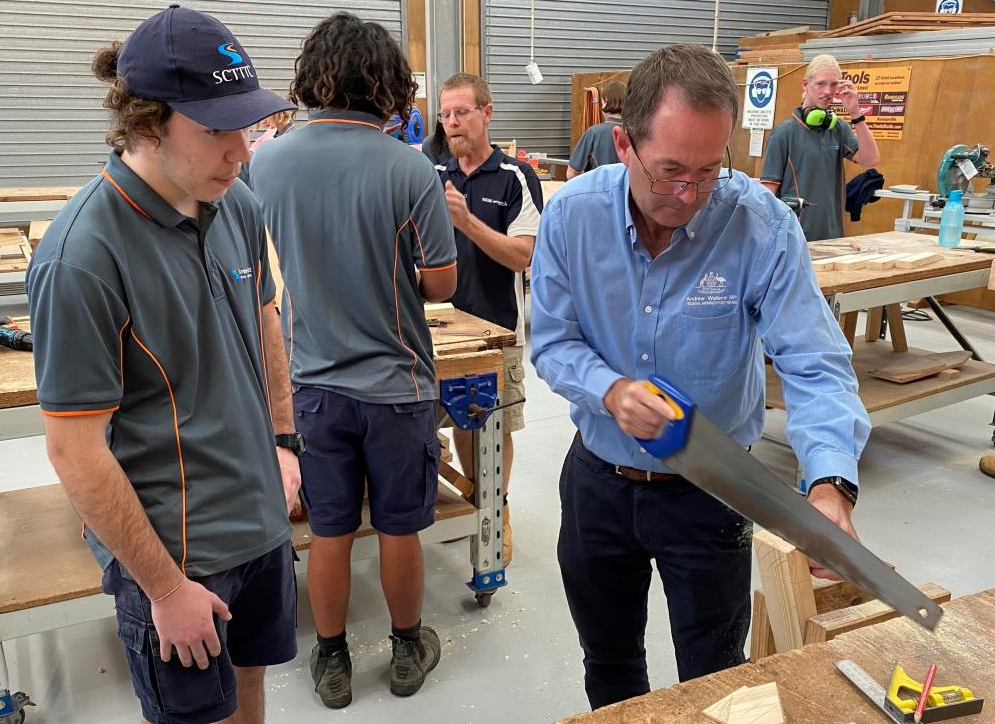
Andrew Wallace at the Sunshine Coast Technical Trade Training Centre in May 2020

Wallace was elected to parliament at the 2016 federal election, succeeding Mal Brough as the Liberal National Party member for the Division of Fisher.

=== Speakership ===
Wallace was a member of the Speaker's panel since September 2019. Following the resignation of Tony Smith as Speaker of the House of Representatives on 23 November 2021, Wallace was elected as the new Speaker by the House of Representatives 70 votes to 59 against Labor Party member and Second Deputy Speaker Rob Mitchell. Like his predecessor, Wallace said he would maintain the practice of not sitting in the Liberal Party room while he holds the Speaker position. On the first sitting day of the 47th parliament, Wallace was re-nominated to the speakership. He received 56 votes and was defeated by ALP nominee Milton Dick, who received 96 votes.

=== Shadow Ministry ===
On 28 May 2025, the new Leader of the Opposition, Sussan Ley announced that Wallace would become the Shadow Cabinet Secretary, responsible for various governance and policy functions within the Shadow Cabinet, Shadow Ministry, and the relevant subcommittees and working groups. In October 2025, as part of a reshuffle of her Shadow Ministry, Opposition Leader Sussan Ley elevated Wallace to the post of Shadow Attorney-General.

=== Committee Roles ===
Wallace has chaired several committees, including the standing committees on Infrastructure, Transport and Cities; Social Policy and Legal Affairs; and Corporations and Financial Services.

He has been a member of the Joint Standing Committee on Foreign Affairs, Defence and Trade since 2017, chairing its Defence Subcommittee whilst in government, serving as deputy chair in opposition. He served as the Deputy Chair, alongside Peter Khalil and successor, Senator Raff Ciccone on the Parliamentary Joint Committee on Intelligence and Security, from mid-2022 to October 2025.

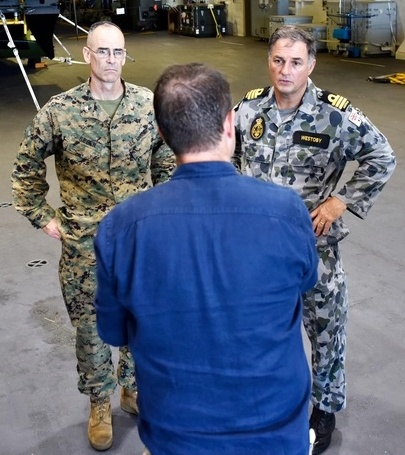
Wallace on HMAS Canberra at sea in 2018

=== Views ===
Wallace is reported to be factionally unaligned, after previously identifying as a member of the centre-right faction during the Morrison government years. Many of his views cohere with a conservative outlook, particularly with regards constitutional matters which, he claimed on the floor of Parliament 2023, Australians hold as well.

==== Industry ====
Being in a hub of the seafood industry, Wallace has been defensive of Australia's longline Tuna fishing and prawning fleets. For his first two terms in Parliament, he served as the Co-Chair of the Parliamentary Friends of the Australian Seafood Industry. He has urged Australia's governments to engage with Western Pacific nations through labour mobility and continues to campaign on other skilled migration issues.

Security

Wallace has served on defence committees and has sought to minimise access to sensitive military sites. He has advocated for tougher regulations on big-tech companies to prevent cyber-bullying, as well as restricting children's access to online gambling and pornography platforms through compulsory third-party identification checks.

Social issues

Initially opposed to same-sex marriage on religious grounds, Wallace later spoke in favour of the Marriage Amendment (Definition and Religious Freedoms) Act 2017. He cited his daughter's coming out and his "legal background" as influential in his change of mind.

In February 2021, Wallace said that Australian banks should create a voluntary code of conduct barring the use of credit cards for online gambling.

International affairs

Wallace has urged Australia to give military support for Ukraine as it resists Russian invasion, and, when speaker, arranged for President Zelensky to address the Parliament on the topic. He has argued that Iran’s tyrannical Revolutionary Guard Corps needs to be brought back to the place where it was "weak, broke and totally under control."

A strong supporter of Israel, Wallace is a member of the Israel Allies Caucus, for which he is the Oceania Chair. Having been given a private briefing on the Hamas-led attack on Israel by Israel officials including the 47 minute atrocity film, and an in-person tour of the affected sites in Sderot, Wallace wrote he had seen "the worst forms of barbarity that a human being can suffer at the hands of another." He has supported Israel's military response and argued that Australians have an obligation to ensure anti-Semitism did not get a foothold in Australia, “whether on a bus, at school, or at work."

In late 2023, Wallace was appointed to represent the Australian Parliament at the United Nations General Assembly.

== Electoral history ==
House of Representatives
Year	Electorate	Party	First preference result				Two candidate result			
Year	Electorate	Party	Votes	%	±%	Position	Votes	%	±%	Result
2016	Fisher	Liberal National Party	40,424	48.26	▲3.79	First	49,473	59.06	▼0.69	Elected
2019	Fisher	Liberal National Party	49,567	50.04	▲1.83	First	62,100	62.70	▲3.55	Elected
2022	Fisher	Liberal National Party	48,013	44.25	▼5.79	First	63,656	58.67	▼4.03	Elected

== Personal life ==
Wallace and his wife Leonie reside in Mooloolah, Queensland, having previously lived in Wurtulla, Alexandra Headlands, and Eudlo. Practising Catholics, the couple have four adult daughters. His youngest daughter lives with a disability, having been born with a segment missing from her chromosome 16, making him a passionate advocate for disability support.

Parliament of Australia
Preceded by Mal Brough	Member for Fisher; 2016–present	Incumbent
Preceded by Tony Smith	Speaker of the Australian House of Representatives; 2021–2022	Succeeded by Milton Dick
