= Peter Slipper =

Australian politician (born 1950)

The Most Reverend and Honourable Peter Slipper
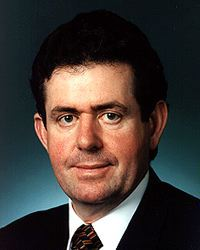

27th Speaker of the Australian House of Representatives
- In office 24 November 2011 – 9 October 2012
- Deputy: Anna Burke
- Preceded by: Harry Jenkins
- Succeeded by: Anna Burke

Deputy Speaker of the Australian House of Representatives
- In office 28 September 2010 – 24 November 2011
- Preceded by: Anna Burke
- Succeeded by: Anna Burke

Parliamentary Secretary to the Minister for Finance and Administration
- In office 21 October 1998 – 22 October 2004
- Prime Minister: John Howard
- Preceded by: New position
- Succeeded by: Sharman Stone

Member of the Australian Parliament for Fisher
- In office 13 March 1993 – 7 September 2013
- Preceded by: Michael Lavarch
- Succeeded by: Mal Brough
- In office 1 December 1984 – 11 July 1987
- Preceded by: Evan Adermann
- Succeeded by: Michael Lavarch

Personal details
- Born: Peter Neil Slipper; 14 February 1950 (age 76) Ipswich, Queensland, Australia
- Party: National (1984–1987); Liberal (1993–2011); Independent (2011–2013); Palmer United (2013)
- Other political affiliations: Liberal National (state level, 2008–2011)
- Spouses: Lyn Hooper (m. 1981; div. 2001) Inge-Jane Hall (m. 2006)
- Relations: Max Hooper (father-in-law)
- Education: University of Queensland
- Occupation: Bishop, politician, barrister, farmer
- Website: peterslippermp.com.au

Peter Neil Slipper (born 14 February 1950) is an Australian former politician and bishop who served as the 27th speaker of the Australian House of Representatives from 2011 to 2012. A member of the Liberal Party of Australia for most of his career, he was the member of parliament (MP) for the division of Fisher from 1984 to 1987 and again from 1993 to 2013. He is the current bishop in Australia for the Catholic Apostolic Church of Australia (ICAB) a mission of the Brazilian Catholic Apostolic Church (Igreja Católica Apostólica Brasileira) and an honorary consul for Brazil in Australia.

Slipper was born in Ipswich, Queensland, and studied arts and law at the University of Queensland. He worked as a lawyer and farmer before entering politics. Slipper was first elected to parliament at the age of 34, standing as a member of the National Party. He was narrowly defeated after one term, but reclaimed the seat at the 1993 election as a member of the Liberal Party. During the Howard government, he served as a government whip and a member of the ministry as a parliamentary secretary now designated as assistant ministers.

After the 2010 election, Slipper fell out with some of his Coalition colleagues over failed earlier moves to disendorse him prior to the election. However all members of the Liberal National Party of Queensland were assured of endorsement following the merger of the Liberal and National Parties in that state. He was elected Deputy Speaker of the House of Representatives in September 2010, with the backing of the Labor Party. In November 2011, he was elected Speaker of the House in place of Labor's Harry Jenkins, who unexpectedly resigned thereby giving the Labor minority government an additional number on the floor. Slipper resigned from the Liberal National Party to become an independent speaker in the Westminster tradition upon taking office, pre-empting moves to expel him. He was the first independent to serve as speaker since Frederick Holder (1901–1909).

In April 2012, Slipper took a leave of absence from the speakership in order to deal with an Australian Federal Police investigation into his alleged misuse of Cabcharge vouchers, as well as sexual harassment allegations from a former staffer, James Ashby. He eventually formally resigned in October 2012; he was unsuccessful in his bid to be re-elected as an independent at the 2013 federal election. Slipper was convicted of defrauding the government in July 2014, but successfully appealed the charges and had his conviction overturned in February 2015. Ashby dropped his sexual harassment lawsuit in June 2014 with his case having been earlier dismissed as an abuse of process by Justice Steven Rares of the Federal Court of Australia.

In 2017, he was consecrated as Bishop in Australia by the Brazilian Catholic Apostolic Church.

== Early life ==
Slipper was born on 14 February 1950 in Ipswich, Queensland. He is the son of Joan and Stanley Slipper; his father was a mechanical engineer/manager with Queensland Railways.

Slipper attended school in Townsville before completing his secondary education at Ipswich Grammar School. He subsequently studied law and arts at the University of Queensland, graduating Bachelor of Laws in 1977 and later as Bachelor of Arts. He subsequently worked as a solicitor and also had business and farming interests.

== Politics ==
Having joined the Young National Party, Slipper was the National Party's campaign director in the Electoral District of Ipswich West in the 1974 state election and in the Division of Oxley at the 1975 federal election. He was state president of the Young Nationals.

Slipper first won Fisher as a National Party candidate in 1984. The once safely conservative seat had become somewhat more marginal after a redistribution pushed the seat into the outer suburbs of Brisbane. During his first term, Slipper was a staunch supporter of the "Joh for Canberra" campaign. He was narrowly defeated in 1987 by Labor's Michael Lavarch. However, a redistribution in 1993 made Fisher notionally Liberal; the Liberals had taken second place in the seat three years earlier. Slipper sought to retake his old seat, this time as a Liberal, and won.

Slipper was government whip from 1997 to 1998, parliamentary secretary to the Minister for Finance and Administration from 1998 to 2004 and parliamentary secretary to the prime minister from 2002 to 2003.

In both government and opposition, Slipper served on a number of parliamentary committees including the House of Representatives Standing Committee on Legal and Constitutional Affairs, where he was chairman (2004 to 2007), deputy chairman (2007 to 2010), the Joint Standing Committee on Public Works, the House of Representatives Standing Committees on Family and Community Affairs where he was chairman (1996 to 1997), the House of Representatives Standing Committee on Privileges and the Joint Standing Committee on Foreign Affairs, Defence and Trade.

=== Alleged abuse of travel entitlements ===
In 2010 Slipper drew significant local and national media attention over the alleged overuse of his parliamentary travel entitlements. Slipper denied any claim of abuse and it was reported in the local newspaper, Sunshine Coast Daily, that ".... (Slipper had said) nearly every incident was a consequence of either a misunderstanding or a disputable interpretation of the rules." The Leader of the Opposition, Tony Abbott, initially backed Slipper, perhaps due to the fact that Slipper had voted for Abbott for the Liberal leadership in December 2009 which Abbott had won by one vote, but later publicly stated that it was up to each member to adhere to the rules regarding entitlements.

Slipper has said that he has been cleared of these allegations.

=== Attempted disendorsement ===
On 14 August 2010, just as the travel abuse allegations were gaining momentum, it was revealed in the Sunshine Coast Daily that a move had been made to attempt to disendorse Slipper in favour of former MP Mal Brough for his seat of Fisher at the next election. However, this move was rejected due to an agreement between the Liberal and National parties about guaranteed endorsement for existing candidates.

By this time, it became apparent that Slipper would lose his LNP endorsement for the next election. With this in mind, Labor believed that Slipper was a potential "weak link" in the Coalition, and sought to use him to bolster its parliamentary standing. On 28 September 2010, Slipper accepted Labor's nomination to serve as Deputy Speaker of the House of Representatives and was elected to that position by 78 votes to 71, defeating the Coalition nominee, Bruce Scott of the National Party. In December 2010, Brough confirmed his intention to seek preselection, by running against Slipper.

Concerned about the damage to the LNP's reputation in the electorate, in March 2011 a motion was moved at the party's Federal Divisional Council "that this Council notes the actions of the Member for Fisher in accepting nomination by the Labor Party for the position of Deputy Speaker and competing for this position in opposition to Mr Bruce Scott MP nominated for this position by the coalition parties and expresses its concern over the ongoing negative publicity directed at the Member for Fisher and the resulting damage to the Liberal National Party and requests the Applicant Review Committee to take note and take action as deemed appropriate". According to media reports, the matter was deferred without discussion to the party's state director.

In September 2011, Slipper raised concerns of alleged branch stacking by Brough, and there was growing pressure over how the LNP would determine preselection of candidates for the seat of Fisher, with Slipper threatening to resign from the party if not re-endorsed.

== Speaker of the House of Representatives ==
In November 2011, Harry Jenkins, a member of the Australian Labor Party, unexpectedly resigned as 26th Speaker of the House of Representatives. Slipper was nominated unopposed and installed as Speaker on 24 November 2011. As a member of the opposition, Slipper's acceptance of Labor's nomination as Speaker was considered a "renegade" action and opposition leader Tony Abbott threatened to expel him from the Liberal Party for his action. Slipper resigned from the Liberal National Party on taking the Speaker's seat and continued in parliament as an independent representative.

Upon his election as speaker, Slipper moved to restore various traditions of the office of speaker. Most notably, Slipper took to wearing the traditional gown and bar jacket over his business attire. He also moved to reinstate once weekly the longer and more formal Speaker's procession into the House involving the Serjeant-at-Arms and the Mace, which had not been seen in three decades. This meant the Speaker's Procession once a week processed briefly through parts of Parliament House open to the public. During his first formal procession into parliament, Slipper wore a gown, bar jacket, and a white bow tie with white bands. This degree of formality occurred only once a week; on other occasions Slipper donned less formal attire which he described as a blend of tradition and modernity. Slipper soon established a no-nonsense reputation; during his first Question Time, he expelled four of his former Coalition colleagues without warning.

=== Sexual harassment and further expenses allegations ===
On 20 April 2012, Slipper was accused of misusing Cabcharge vouchers. These allegations were then investigated by the Australian Federal Police, with a summons issued in January 2013 in relation to matters unconnected with the James Ashby allegations which were later withdrawn by Ashby. He was also accused of sexually harassing James Ashby who was a member of his staff. Ashby, a 33-year-old gay man, alleged that Slipper sexually harassed him on a number of occasions, via mobile phone text messages and in private conversations. A sexual harassment case regarding these allegations was dismissed by the Federal Court on 12 December 2012, after Slipper argued that the charges were "vexatious and an abuse of the legal process".

The Opposition Leader, Tony Abbott, and other senior Opposition figures such as the Leader of the Opposition in the Senate, Eric Abetz, called for Slipper to resign until Ashby's claims were investigated. The Government said it was a legal matter and that they would not be asking for Slipper's resignation. However, in April 2012, Slipper briefly stepped aside from the speakership, resumed the position shortly afterwards, but announced to the House in May that he would not take the chair in the House for the time being (and therefore not enter the chamber of the House as Speaker), while investigations into the alleged travel-related misconduct were conducted. The Coalition, as well as Rob Oakeshott, Andrew Wilkie and Tony Windsor, called on Slipper to continue to stand aside pending a resolution of the sexual harassment claims.

On 27 April 2012, Slipper released copies of Cabcharge documents for at least two of the dates in question (a third group of documents contained illegible dates) along with a written statement saying they were clearly in his handwriting, therefore disproving the allegation he handed over blanks. The Government agreed, but various questions about the documents, including whether the payments were inflated and even whether Slipper signed them all, were raised in the media. Julia Gillard announced on 29 April 2012 that she had spoken to Slipper and he had agreed to stay away from the House for "a further period".

On 8 May 2012, Slipper resumed the chair as Speaker and read out a statement denying the allegations against him. He then formally requested that the Deputy Speaker, Anna Burke, take the chair in his absence.

Federal Court Justice Steven Rares dismissed the sexual harassment charges against Slipper in December 2012, saying that he had "reached the firm conclusion that Mr Ashby's predominant purpose for bringing these proceedings was to pursue a political attack against Mr Slipper and not to vindicate any legal claim he may have for which the right to bring proceedings exists." However, in February 2014 Ashby successfully appealed against the decision to dismiss the case. Ashby abandoned his lawsuit against Slipper in June 2014.

On 8 January 2013 the federal police summonsed Slipper alleging three offenses against section 135.1(5)/ Criminal Code Act 1995 (Cth) in relation to allegations concerning the use of Cabcharge vouchers. Slipper was due to answer these allegations in the ACT Magistrates Court on 15 February 2013. According to documents released by the court, Slipper was alleged to have used Cabcharge to pay for hire cars to visit a number of wineries in the Canberra region in January, April, and June 2010.

On 28 July 2014, Slipper was found guilty of dishonestly using taxpayer funds to visit Canberra wineries for his own enjoyment. On 24 September 2014, he was sentenced to 300 hours community service and ordered to reimburse taxpayers for the $954 total that was spent on the trips. Slipper appealed the sentence, and the case was heard in December 2014. Justice John Burns reserved his decision until 26 February 2015, when he ruled the appeal be upheld and the conviction and sentence be set aside.

=== Resignation as Speaker of the House ===
Slipper announced his resignation in Parliament on 9 October 2012. Earlier in the day a motion of no confidence was defeated by one vote (69/70). However, key independent members Tony Windsor and Rob Oakeshott, despite voting against the earlier no confidence motion, later informed Slipper that they could not continue to support him as Speaker given the damning text messages. Slipper later entered Parliament and, when announcing his resignation, said:

I leave this position without rancour, with a great deal of sadness and, more importantly, with a great deal of regret because I believe that, given the controversy which has occurred in recent times, that it is in the interests of the Parliament that I should take the course of action that I have personally chosen to take.

He then moved to the crossbench as an independent member of the House.

On 11 May 2013, he apparently joined the Palmer United Party, also known as the (revived) United Australia Party. This situation was short-lived; just hours after announcing his membership had been accepted, the party released a statement on its website announcing members had decided to revoke Slipper's membership under clause D26 of the constitution of the party. Slipper, however, claimed that he had withdrawn his application for membership after finding out that the party had announced without his knowledge that he was joining.

Slipper stood as an independent candidate in the Division of Fisher at the 2013 federal election, but his replacement as LNP candidate, Mal Brough, won the seat resoundingly. Brough subsequently faced a Federal Police investigation in relation his role concerning the theft of the Speaker's diary and announced he would not contest the following election.

== Religion ==
In 2008, Slipper was ordained as a priest of the Anglican Catholic Church in Australia, a member church of the Traditional Anglican Communion (TAC) and considered part of the international Continuing Anglican movement. He was ordained by Archbishop John Hepworth and served as chancellor. The ordination was controversial to some as Slipper has no formal theological training and he was ordained without the knowledge of the wider TAC clergy. He was also the chancellor of the TAC, having succeeded Michael Atkinson, but resigned from this position in August 2012.

Slipper was made chancellor and later vicar-general of the Church of Torres Strait, a then member church of the Traditional Anglican Communion which had signed an agreement to enter into the Roman Catholic Church as part of the Personal Ordinariate of Our Lady of the Southern Cross (OLSC), though that agreement never came to fruition. In 2016, Slipper travelled to Brazil to be ordained as a deacon and priest and was instrumental in the CTS applying to join the Brazilian Catholic Apostolic Church (ICAB) in a unanimous vote of its synod in that year.

== Personal life ==
Slipper married Lyn Hooper in 1981. Her father Max Hooper was a Queensland state government minister. The couple had two children before divorcing in 2001. In 2006, Slipper married Inge Hall at a high-profile ceremony attended by many of his parliamentary colleagues.

== See also ==
- Politics of Australia

Parliament of Australia
Preceded by Evan Adermann	Member for Fisher; 1984–1987	Succeeded by Michael Lavarch
Preceded by Michael Lavarch	Member for Fisher; 1993–2013	Succeeded by Mal Brough
Preceded by Harry Jenkins	Speaker of the Australian House of Representatives; 2011–2012	Succeeded by Anna Burke
