= Mal Brough =

Australian former politician (born 1961)

The Honourable Mal Brough

Minister for Defence Material and Science
- In office 21 September 2015 – 29 December 2015
- Prime Minister: Malcolm Turnbull
- Preceded by: Stuart Robert
- Succeeded by: Marise Payne

Special Minister of State
- In office 21 September 2015 – 29 December 2015
- Prime Minister: Malcolm Turnbull
- Preceded by: Michael Ronaldson
- Succeeded by: Mathias Cormann

Minister for Families, Community Services and Indigenous Affairs
- In office 27 January 2006 – 3 December 2007
- Prime Minister: John Howard
- Preceded by: Kay Patterson
- Succeeded by: Jenny Macklin

Minister for Revenue and Assistant Treasurer
- In office 18 July 2004 – 27 January 2006
- Prime Minister: John Howard
- Preceded by: Helen Coonan
- Succeeded by: Peter Dutton

Minister for Employment Services
- In office 14 February 2001 – 18 July 2004
- Prime Minister: John Howard
- Preceded by: Tony Abbott
- Succeeded by: Fran Bailey

Member of the Australian Parliament for Fisher
- In office 7 September 2013 – 9 May 2016
- Preceded by: Peter Slipper
- Succeeded by: Andrew Wallace

Member of the Australian Parliament for Longman
- In office 2 March 1996 – 24 November 2007
- Preceded by: Constituency Created
- Succeeded by: Jon Sullivan

Personal details
- Born: Malcolm Thomas Brough; 29 December 1961 (age 64) Brisbane, Queensland, Australia
- Party: Liberal Party of Australia
- Other political affiliations: Liberal National Party of Queensland
- Spouse: Sue Brough
- Relations: Rob Brough (brother)
- Education: Monash University

Military service
- Branch/service: Australian Army
- Years of service: 1979–1987
- Rank: Captain

Malcolm Thomas Brough (/ˈbrʌf/ BRUF; born 29 December 1961) is an Australian former politician. He represented the Liberal Party in the House of Representatives (1996–2007, 2013–2016) and held ministerial office in the Howard and Turnbull governments.

Brough was born in Brisbane and was an Australian Army officer and businessman before entering politics. He was first elected to parliament at the 1996 federal election, representing the Queensland seat of Longman. He was made a parliamentary secretary in 2000 and subsequently served as Minister for Employment Services (2001–2004) and Minister for Revenue and Assistant Treasurer (2004–2006). Brough was promoted to cabinet in 2006 as Minister for Families, Community Services and Indigenous Affairs, and subsequently oversaw the controversial Northern Territory Emergency Response. He lost his seat at the 2007 election, at which the government was defeated.

As state president of the Liberals, Brough opposed the merger which led to the creation of the Liberal National Party of Queensland in 2008. He returned to federal parliament in 2013, standing in the seat of Fisher. In September 2015 Brough was reappointed to the ministry by Malcolm Turnbull, who replaced Tony Abbott as Liberal leader and prime minister. However, his second stint as a minister lasted only until December 2015, as he resigned from the ministry following revelations that the Australian Federal Police had investigated him over his dealings with James Ashby. In February 2016 he announced that he would not seek preselection for the seat of Fisher at the 2016 federal election.

== Early life ==
Brough was born on 29 December 1961 in Brisbane, Queensland. He served in the Australian Army from 1979 to 1987 following this he worked in the private sector. His brother Rob Brough is a Seven News presenter and former host of Family Feud.

There is a longstanding belief in Brough's family that they have Indigenous Australian ancestry through his maternal grandmother, Violet Bowden. Bowden's understanding was that her − mostly absent and estranged − father was Aboriginal. Brough does not seek to identify himself as Aboriginal, although he does not reject the possibility. His comments on the subject have, on at least one occasion, been interpreted as dismissive of his possible Aboriginal heritage, or Aboriginal culture in general. His sister, Carol Stubbs, has served on the board of several Aboriginal corporations.

== Political career ==
Brough was Parliamentary Secretary to the Minister for Employment, Workplace Relations and Small Business 2000–2001 and Minister for Employment Services from 2001 to 2004. In July 2004 he was moved to the portfolios of Assistant Treasurer and Minister for Revenue. He was Minister for Families and Community Services and Indigenous Affairs from January 2006 to November 2007. In his Indigenous Affairs portfolio, Brough was the chief architect of the government's Northern Territory Emergency Response, a package of measures designed to combat alleged high rates of child neglect and abuse in the territory.

Brough was one of a number of government MPs including Prime Minister John Howard who lost their seats at the 2007 election. Brough suffered a swing of 10.3 points in the two-party-preferred vote in his seat, to finish with a vote of 46.4 percent. He was succeeded by Labor's Jon Sullivan. Brough switched to the seat of Fisher and won it back from Liberal turned independent and the Speaker of the House of Representatives Peter Slipper at the 2013 federal election.

=== State politics ===
Brough was elected as the President of the Queensland division of the Liberal Party in May 2008. He remained in that position after a vote in July 2008 to merge into the new Liberal National Party of Queensland (LNP). He opposed the merger as it had not received final ratification from the federal Liberal Party. On 26 September 2008 he resigned from his post, saying: "You try and do the right thing and, quite frankly, at this point it's all over the shop and it's no wonder voters get so disenchanted with the non-Labor side of politics."

It was because of his opposition of the merger to the LNP that he was not a candidate for his former seat of Longman at the 2010 federal election. That would have meant securing preselection from the LNP in order to have a good chance of reclaiming the seat. He also criticised the party leading up to the 2010 election on its absence of policies, but he did not rule out running for his resident seat of Fisher against Peter Slipper, a National party member who had joined the Liberals.

=== Federal politics and diary allegations ===
In 2006, Brough was the Minister for Families and Community Services and Indigenous Affairs. Faced with allegations regarding the degradation of Aboriginal communities and frequent cases of child sexual abuse, Brough, combined with the Northern Territory Chief Minister Clare Martin, commissioned a report into child sexual abuse in the Northern Territory. This report received much criticism, beginning with the view that it was a hasty reaction to these allegations. Researchers have suggested that the report was not simply used as an opportunity to resolve these issues, but rather as another way to control these communities.

In mid-2012, following the defection of Peter Slipper from the Liberals to become an independent MP and Speaker of the House of Representatives, Brough announced that he was seeking LNP preselection for the seat of Fisher for the 2013 federal election. On 29 July 2012, it was announced that had won the preselection for the seat, despite criticism over his contact with James Ashby. Ashby had been an adviser to Slipper who had made accusation of sexual harassment. Justice Steve Rares found that Brough had acted with Ashby and another Slipper staffer, Karen Doane, in abusing the judicial process for the "purpose of causing significant public, reputational and political damage to Mr Slipper". On 9 October 2012, Slipper resigned as Speaker following revelations of mobile phone text messages he had sent to Ashby. In an early 2014 appeal ruling the full bench of the Federal Court found that Justice Rares had "no basis to conclude that Brough was part of any combination with anyone in respect to the commencement of these proceedings with the predominant purpose of damaging Slipper in the way alleged or at all", and that there was "nothing untoward about those matters".

In March 2013, Brough was the subject of controversy after posting a mock menu ahead of a Liberal Party fundraiser, which included an obscene characterisation of the body of then-Prime Minister Julia Gillard. Gillard and former Prime Minister Kevin Rudd subsequently called for Brough to be disendorsed; Opposition Leader Tony Abbott condemned the comments but stated that Brough should not be disendorsed.

On 29 December 2015 Brough stood down from the Turnbull Ministry and moved to the backbench pending the completion of an investigation by the Australian Federal Police over the alleged copying of the diary of former speaker Peter Slipper. Jamie Briggs also resigned on the same day. Questions were raised over the holiday timing of the announcements.

On 13 February 2016, Brough resigned from the Ministry. On 26 February he announced that he would not recontest the seat of Fisher, concluding that it was "a privilege and an honour" to represent the electorate.

Parliament of Australia
New division	Member for Longman; 1996–2007	Succeeded by Jon Sullivan
Preceded by Peter Slipper	Member for Fisher; 2013–2016	Succeeded by Andrew Wallace
Political offices
Preceded by Tony Abbott	Minister for Employment Services; 2001–2004	Succeeded by Fran Bailey
Preceded by Helen Coonan	Minister for Revenue and Assistant Treasurer; 2004–2006	Succeeded by Peter Dutton
Preceded by Kay Patterson	Minister for Families and Community; Services and Indigenous Affairs; 2006–2007	Succeeded by Jenny Macklin
Preceded by Michael Ronaldson	Special Minister of State; 2015	Succeeded by Mathias Cormann
Preceded by Stuart Robert	Minister for Defence Materiel and Science; 2015	Succeeded by Marise Payne as acting
