= Alex Somlyay =

Australian politician (born 1946)

The Honourable Alex Somlyay
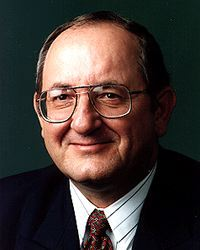

Minister for Regional Development, Territories and Local Government
- In office 9 October 1997 – 21 October 1998
- Prime Minister: John Howard
- Preceded by: Warwick Smith
- Succeeded by: Ian Macdonald

Member of the Australian Parliament for Fairfax
- In office 24 March 1990 – 5 August 2013
- Preceded by: Evan Adermann
- Succeeded by: Clive Palmer

Personal details
- Born: 18 January 1946 (age 80) Budapest, Hungary
- Party: Liberal
- Spouse: Jenny
- Children: 3
- Education: Australian National University
- Occupation: Public servant

Alexander Michael Somlyay (born 18 January 1946) is an Australian former politician. He was a member of the House of Representatives from 1990 to 2013, representing the Queensland seat of Fairfax for the Liberal Party. He briefly held ministerial office in the Howard government as Minister for Regional Development, Territories and Local Government from 1997 to 1998.

== Early life ==
Somlyay was born on 18 January 1946 in Budapest, Hungary. He is of Hungarian-Jewish descent; he and his parents arrived in Australia in 1949 as stateless persons, with his parents having been stripped of their Hungarian citizenship during World War II. In the early 1990s he renounced any claim to Hungarian citizenship in accordance with section 44(i) of the Australian constitution, in advance of a new Hungarian law that would have granted citizenship retrospectively.

Somlyay joined the Commonwealth Public Service in 1963 and worked for several different departments. He completed the degree of Bachelor of Economics in 1975 at the Australian National University (ANU). He later moved to the Sunshine Coast, Queensland, where he was a consultant economist and company director.

== Politics ==
Somlyay was senior private secretary to National Country Party MP Evan Adermann from 1976 to 1980. He later joined the Liberal Party and was chair of its Maroochydore branch.

At the 1990 federal election, Somlyay won the seat of Fairfax for the Liberal Party following Adermann's retirement. He defeated high-profile Nationals shadow minister John Stone, who was attempting to transfer to the House of Representatives from the Senate. His campaign targeted Stone as an outsider who would not make a suitable local member.

Somlyay was a member of the informal conservative faction the Lyons Forum when it was active in the 1990s. He held junior portfolios in John Hewson's shadow ministry from 1992 to 1994, as secretary to the shadow cabinet and shadow parliamentary secretary to the leader of the opposition. In 1997 he was appointed Minister for Regional Development, Territories and Local Government in the Howard government, following a ministerial reshuffle. He was not retained in the ministry after the 1998 federal election.

Somlyay chaired a number of committees during his parliamentary tenure and was chief opposition whip in the House of Representatives from 2008 to 2010. Following the 2010 federal election, at which the Australian Labor Party (ALP) retained office at the head of a minority government, he publicly announced that he would stand for deputy speaker of the House of Representatives with the endorsement of the ALP. His announcement was controversial as the position is typically held by a member of the governing party and he stated that he would support the government on confidence and supply. However, Somlyay subsequently withdrew his candidacy for the position.

In September 2010 Somlyay announced that he would not stand for re-election at the next federal election. In his valedictory speech to parliament in June 2013 he stated that his political career had been affected by a range of health issues including "a stroke in 1993 followed by two lots of heart bypass surgeries, seven angioplasties, a pacemaker, diabetes and cancer".

=== Expenses investigation ===
An investigation by a Fairfax Media reporter published in the Sydney Morning Herald in January 2014 alleged that Somlyay had used his parliamentary office to pay his wife almost seventy thousand dollars for the year 2012–13 "for non-existent work in his electorate office." The report also alleged that Somlyay had obscured his wife's identity in his list of employed staff. Somlyay defended the payments from his taxpayer-funded budget to his wife, claiming that he had done nothing wrong. On February of the same year, the Herald again reported that the Australian Federal Police had found nothing that "would constitute a criminal offence" related to the employment of his wife and closed the investigation.

Political offices
Preceded by Warwick Smith	Minister for Regional Development, Territories and Local Government; 1997–1998	Succeeded by Ian Macdonald
Parliament of Australia
Preceded by Evan Adermann	Member for Fairfax; 1990–2013	Succeeded by Clive Palmer
