= Ted O'Brien =

Australian politician (born 1974)

Ted O'Brien MP
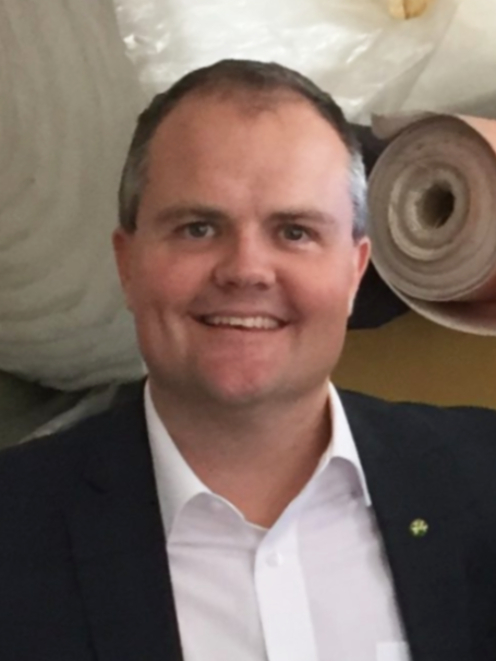
- O'Brien in 2017

Shadow Minister for Foreign Affairs
- Incumbent
- Assumed office 17 February 2026
- Leader: Angus Taylor
- Preceded by: Michaelia Cash
Previous shadow ministerial positions
Shadow Treasurer
In office 28 May 2025 – 17 February 2026
Leader	Sussan Ley
Preceded by	Angus Taylor
Succeeded by	Tim Wilson
Shadow Assistant Treasurer Shadow Minister for Financial Services
Acting; 30 January 2026 – 17 February 2026
Leader	Sussan Ley
Preceded by	Pat Conaghan
Succeeded by	Pat Conaghan
Shadow Minister for Energy Affordability and Reliability
In office 25 January 2025 – 28 May 2025
Leader	Peter Dutton; Sussan Ley
Preceded by	Melissa McIntosh (as Shadow Minister for Energy Affordability)
Succeeded by	Position abolished
Shadow Minister for Climate Change and Energy
In office 5 June 2022 – 28 May 2025
Leader	Peter Dutton; Sussan Ley
Preceded by	Chris Bowen
Succeeded by	Dan Tehan (as Shadow Minister for Energy and Emissions Reduction)
Party positions
Deputy Leader of the Opposition
In office 13 May 2025 – 13 February 2026
Leader	Sussan Ley
Preceded by	Sussan Ley
Succeeded by	Jane Hume
Deputy Leader of the Liberal Party
In office 13 May 2025 – 13 February 2026
Leader	Sussan Ley
Preceded by	Sussan Ley
Succeeded by	Jane Hume

Member of the Australian Parliament for Fairfax
- Incumbent
- Assumed office 2 July 2016
- Preceded by: Clive Palmer

5th Chair of the Australian Republic Movement
- In office 2005–2007
- Preceded by: John Warhurst
- Succeeded by: Michael Keating

Personal details
- Born: Edward Lynam O'Brien; 7 May 1974 (age 52) Brisbane, Queensland, Australia
- Party: Liberal (LNP)
- Education: University of Queensland; National Taiwan Normal University; London School of Economics; University of Melbourne
- Occupation: Politician

Edward Lynam O'Brien (born 7 May 1974) is an Australian politician who served as the deputy leader of the Opposition from 2025 to 2026. He held office as the deputy leader of the Liberal Party under Sussan Ley and has been the member of Parliament (MP) for the Queensland division of Fairfax since 2016. Prior to entering politics, he was a businessman and lobbyist, serving as chairman of the Australian Republic Movement from 2005 until 2007.

== Early life ==
O'Brien was born on 7 May 1974 in Brisbane, Queensland. He is the youngest of nine children and one of seven sons born to Tom and Bernice O'Brien. His father's family were the founders of the Defiance Flour Mill in Toowoomba. The mill evolved into "a well-known Queensland business dynasty in flour manufacturing" and O'Brien's first job was as a trainee baker.

O'Brien holds degrees from the University of Queensland (Bachelor of Arts), London School of Economics (Master of Economics) and University of Melbourne (Master of Business Administration), and he studied Mandarin Chinese at the National Taiwan Normal University under an Asia Pacific Fellowship.

== Career ==
Before entering politics O'Brien worked overseas for an extended period in business development roles. He lived in China, Taiwan and Hong Kong for periods. O'Brien's first roles were with Defiance International, an offshoot of his family company, and he later worked with the Australian Ricegrowers' Cooperative and with Accenture, where he worked for over a decade, including Director of Growth and Strategy for the Asia Pacific and Emerging Markets, based out of Beijing. After returning to Australia he became the Queensland managing director of lobbying firm Barton Deakin. In 2014 he established his own consultancy firm, Ted O'Brien & Associates.

O'Brien served as chairman of the Australian Republican Movement from 2005 to 2007. During his tenure the organisation shifted its headquarters from Sydney to Canberra. It was reported that he and the national executive would "concentrate their Canberra lobbying on Coalition MPs, who are essential to any political move to revisit the question of a republic". O'Brien also served as chairman of the South-East Queensland branch of Ronald McDonald House Charities and on the board of the Queensland Catholic Education Advisory Board.

== Politics ==
=== Early candidacies ===
O'Brien first ran for parliament at the 2007 federal election, losing to the incumbent Australian Labor Party (ALP) member Arch Bevis in the Division of Brisbane. He campaigned on the slogan "Time for Ted". O'Brien was the chairman of the Liberal National Party Futures Committee from 2011 to 2013. In November 2012, he won LNP preselection for the Division of Fairfax, defeating former national rugby coach John Connolly. He faced a high-profile challenger at the 2013 federal election, with mining magnate Clive Palmer contesting Fairfax as the leader of his Palmer United Party. Following a recount, Palmer defeated O'Brien by 53 votes on the two-candidate-preferred vote.

During the term, O'Brien claimed that many residents had come to him for help after not being able to get help from Palmer, to the point that many of them considered him their MP.

=== Federal politics ===
In May 2015, O'Brien again won LNP preselection for Fairfax. It was initially expected that Palmer would seek re-election in the same seat, but he eventually decided to leave federal politics. O'Brien subsequently regained Fairfax for the LNP at the 2016 federal election. The LNP had been heavily tipped to reclaim the seat with Palmer's retirement. Fairfax, like most Sunshine Coast seats, tilts conservative, and O'Brien would have retained it with a four percent swing in a "traditional" matchup with Labor in 2013. As expected, O'Brien won easily.

O'Brien has served on a number of House of Representatives committees, including as chair of the Standing Committee on Environment and Energy from July 2019, a member of the Joint Standing Committee on Foreign Affairs, Defence and trade, and Chair of the Trade Sub-Committee. In 2019 he was nominated to represent the Morrison government on the Olympic Candidature Leadership Group overseeing South-East Queensland's prospective bid for the 2032 Summer Olympics.

From 5 June 2022 until the 2025 federal election, O'Brien served as the Shadow Minister for Climate Change and Energy.

Following the 2025 Liberal Party leadership election, O'Brien was elected as Deputy Leader of the Opposition and Deputy Leader of the Liberal Party under the leadership of Sussan Ley. O'Brien was also appointed as Shadow Treasurer.

In the 2026 Liberal Party of Australia leadership election, O'Brien was successfully challenged for the position of Deputy Leader of the Liberal Party by Jane Hume. He lost his role of Shadow Treasurer, but was reappointed to the Shadow Cabinet as Shadow Minister for Foreign Affairs.

=== Political views ===
O'Brien is an advocate of nuclear power. In 2019 he chaired a parliamentary inquiry into nuclear energy. O'Brien advocated for the nation-wide adoption of nuclear energy during the 2025 federal election.

In September 2020, O'Brien called for Australia to negotiate a free-trade agreement with Taiwan, citing similar agreements with New Zealand and Singapore.

O'Brien is factionally aligned with the Moderates.

Parliament of Australia
Preceded by Clive Palmer	Member for Fairfax; 2016–present	Incumbent
Preceded by Sussan Ley	Deputy Leader of the Opposition; 2025–2026	Succeeded by Jane Hume
Party political offices
Preceded by Sussan Ley	Deputy Leader of the Liberal Party; 2025–2026	Succeeded by Jane Hume
