= Evan Adermann =

Australian politician

The Honourable Evan Adermann AO
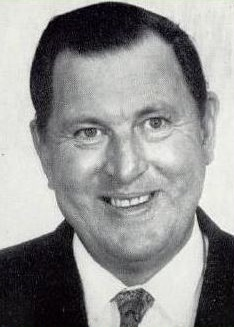

Minister for Veterans' Affairs
- In office 4 July 1978 – 3 November 1980
- Prime Minister: Malcolm Fraser
- Preceded by: Vic Garland
- Succeeded by: Tony Messner

Minister for the Northern Territory
- In office 22 December 1975 – 28 September 1978
- Prime Minister: Malcolm Fraser
- Preceded by: Ian Sinclair (Northern Australia)
- Succeeded by: (abolished)

Member of the Australian Parliament for Fairfax
- In office 1 December 1984 – 19 February 1990
- Preceded by: New seat
- Succeeded by: Alex Somlyay

Member of the Australian Parliament for Fisher
- In office 2 December 1972 – 1 December 1984
- Preceded by: Charles Adermann
- Succeeded by: Peter Slipper

Personal details
- Born: 10 March 1927 Kingaroy, Queensland, Australia
- Died: 3 November 2001 (aged 74)
- Party: National (Country)
- Relations: Charles Adermann (father)
- Education: University of Queensland
- Occupation: Farmer

Albert Evan Adermann AO (10 March 1927 – 3 November 2001) was an Australian politician. He was a member of the National (Country) Party and succeeded his father Sir Charles Adermann in federal parliament. He held ministerial office in the Fraser government as Minister for the Northern Territory (1975–1978) and Minister for Veterans' Affairs (1978–1980).

== Early life ==
Adermann was born in Kingaroy, Queensland, son of Charles Adermann, and was educated at Brisbane Boys' College. He did not complete a medical degree at the University of Queensland and instead became a dairy farmer in Kingaroy. He then completed a Bachelor of Commerce by external study at University of Queensland and worked as a public accountant. He married Joan Hovard in 1951 and they had three sons and two daughters. He was a councillor of Kingaroy Shire from 1958 to 1967.

== Political career ==
Adermann was elected as the member for Fisher following the retirement of his father at the 1972 election and represented the Country Party (National Country Party from 1975). He was appointed Minister for the Northern Territory following the Fraser government's win at the 1975 election and held it until its abolition in September 1978. He put in place the arrangements for Northern Territory self-government and was responsible for the establishment of Uluru National Park and continuing the reconstruction of Darwin after Cyclone Tracy. In July 1978, he was appointed Minister for Veterans' Affairs and held it until November 1980. He was responsible for establishing an inquiry into the effects of Agent Orange on Australian servicemen who had fought in the Malayan Emergency and the Vietnam War. Ahead of the 1984 election, a redistribution transferred the most conservative portions of Fisher, including his home to the new Division of Fairfax. Adermann ran for this seat and won it easily. He continued to represent Fairfax until his retirement from parliament at the 1990 election.

== Later life ==
Adermann became president of the Queensland Church of Christ and was made an Officer of the Order of Australia in 1990 for "services to the Australian parliament, to the community, particularly through the Churches of Christ in Queensland, and to local government". He died in 2001 and was survived by his wife, three sons and two daughters. Evan's nephew Greg Adermann has served as the Councillor for Pullenvale Ward in the Brisbane City Council since March 2020.

== Notes ==
Political offices
Preceded by Ian Sinclair	Minister for the Northern Territory; 1975–78	Position abolished
Preceded by Victor Garland	Minister for Veterans' Affairs; 1978–80	Succeeded by Tony Messner
Parliament of Australia
Preceded by Charles Adermann	Member for Fisher; 1972–84	Succeeded by Peter Slipper
New division	Member for Fairfax; 1984–90	Succeeded by Alex Somlyay
