= Division of Fisher =

Australian federal electoral division

Coordinates: 26.789°S 152.899°E

Fisher Australian House of Representatives Division
- Interactive map of boundaries since the 2019 federal election
- Created: 1949
- MP: Andrew Wallace
- Party: Liberal (Note: Member of the Liberal National Party of Queensland sitting with the federal parliamentary Liberal Party.)
- Namesake: Andrew Fisher
- Electors: 139,123 (2025)
- Area: 1,198 km^{2} (462.6 sq mi)
- Demographic: Provincial

The Division of Fisher is an Australian Electoral Division in Queensland. The current MP is Andrew Wallace of the Liberal National Party of Queensland.

== Geography ==
Since 1984, federal electoral division boundaries in Australia have been determined at redistributions by a redistribution committee appointed by the Australian Electoral Commission. Redistributions occur for the boundaries of divisions in a particular state, and they occur every seven years, or sooner if a state's representation entitlement changes or when divisions of a state are malapportioned.

== History ==
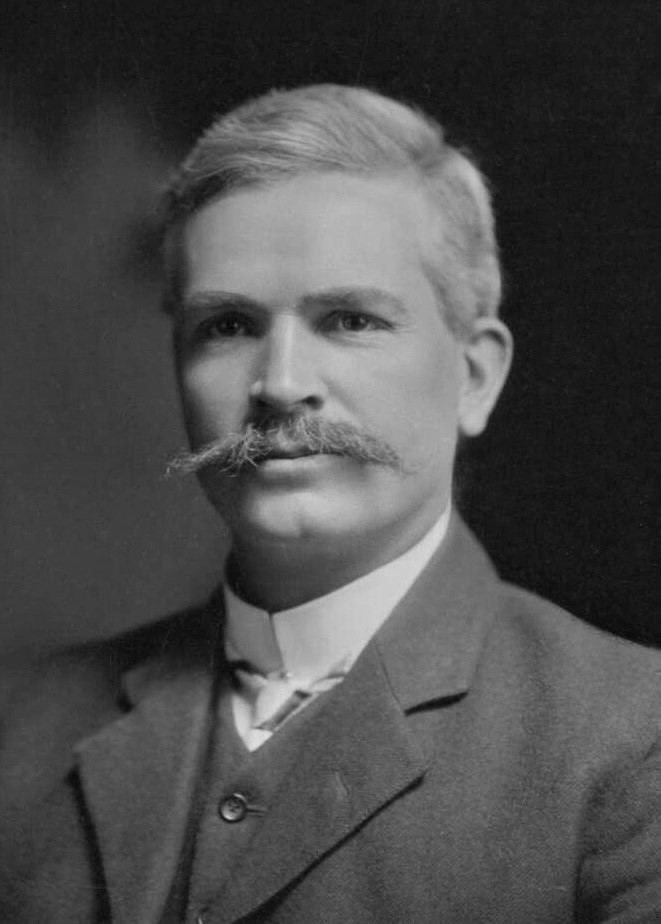
Andrew Fisher, the division's namesake

The division was created in 1949 and is named after Andrew Fisher, Prime Minister of Australia on three non-consecutive occasions within the first two decades following Federation. It is located in the Sunshine Coast area north of Brisbane and includes the towns of Caloundra, Mooloolaba, Beerwah, Maleny, Woodford and Kilcoy.

As originally created, it extended as far inland as Kingaroy, but gradually moved eastward from the 1960s onward to become an entirely Sunshine Coast-based seat. It was a safe seat for the National Party until the 1980s. However, some of its more conservative territory was shifted to the new seat of Fairfax in 1984, replaced by some more marginal territory in the outer northern suburbs of Brisbane. On these boundaries, Labor took the seat in 1987.

The Brisbane portion was removed in 1993 (mostly going to the new seat of Dickson), erasing Labor's majority and making Fisher notionally Liberal. The Liberals took the seat in 1993, and have held it for all but two years since then without much difficulty. To date, it is the last time Labor has held a Sunshine Coast seat.

Its most prominent members have been Sir Charles Adermann, who was Deputy Leader of the Country Party 1964–66, and Peter Slipper, who served as Speaker of the Australian House of Representatives from 2011 to 2012. Following the resignation of Harry Jenkins as Speaker in the 43rd Parliament, Peter Slipper was nominated unopposed and installed as Speaker on 24 November 2011. Slipper resigned from the Liberal National Party on taking the Speaker's seat and continued in parliament as an independent member and resigned as speaker and went to the cross bench on 9 October 2012. On 11 May 2013, he joined businessman Clive Palmer's recently formed Palmer United Party, becoming its first member in federal parliament. However, a matter of hours later his membership of the party was revoked and Slipper returned to being an independent.

== Members ==
Image	Member	Party	Term	Notes
	Sir Charles Adermann (1896–1979)	Country	10 December 1949 – 2 November 1972	Previously held the Division of Maranoa. Served as minister under Menzies and Holt. Retired. Son was Evan Adermann
	Evan Adermann (1927–2001)	Country	2 December 1972 – 2 May 1975	Served as minister under Fraser. Transferred to the Division of Fairfax. Father was Sir Charles Adermann
	Evan Adermann (1927–2001)	National Country	2 May 1975 – 16 October 1982	Served as minister under Fraser. Transferred to the Division of Fairfax. Father was Sir Charles Adermann
	Evan Adermann (1927–2001)	Nationals	16 October 1982 – 1 December 1984	Served as minister under Fraser. Transferred to the Division of Fairfax. Father was Sir Charles Adermann
	Peter Slipper (1950–)	Nationals	1 December 1984 – 11 July 1987	Lost seat
	Michael Lavarch (1961–)	Labor	11 July 1987 – 13 March 1993	Transferred to the Division of Dickson
	Peter Slipper (1950–)	Liberal	13 March 1993 – 24 November 2011	Served as Speaker during the Gillard government. Lost seat
	Peter Slipper (1950–)	Independent	24 November 2011 – 11 May 2013	Served as Speaker during the Gillard government. Lost seat
	Peter Slipper (1950–)	Palmer United	11 May 2013	Served as Speaker during the Gillard government. Lost seat
	Peter Slipper (1950–)	Independent	11 May 2013 – 7 September 2013	Served as Speaker during the Gillard government. Lost seat
	Mal Brough (1961–)	Liberal	7 September 2013 – 9 May 2016	Previously held the Division of Longman. Served as minister under Turnbull. Retired
	Andrew Wallace (1968–)	Liberal	2 July 2016 – present	Served as Speaker during the Morrison Government. Incumbent

== Election results ==
2025 Australian federal election: Fisher
Party	Candidate	Votes	%	±%
Liberal National	Andrew Wallace	44,100	37.22	−7.03
Labor	Morrison Lakey	26,380	22.27	−1.06
Independent	Keryn Jones	19,296	16.29	+16.29
Greens	Renay Wells	11,396	9.62	−4.19
One Nation	Benjamin Kelly	7,199	6.08	−3.23
People First	James Pidgeon	4,972	4.20	+4.20
Trumpet of Patriots	Denis Fricot	3,050	2.57	+2.57
Family First	Bronwen Bolitho	2,079	1.75	+1.75
Total formal votes		118,472	94.57	−2.28
Informal votes		6,798	5.43	+2.28
Turnout		125,270	90.08	+1.01
Two-party-preferred result
Liberal National	Andrew Wallace	66,385	56.03	−2.64
Labor	Morrison Lakey	52,087	43.97	+2.64
Liberal National hold		Swing	−2.64	

2022 Australian federal election: Fisher
Party	Candidate	Votes	%	±%
Liberal National	Andrew Wallace	48,013	44.25	−5.79
Labor	Judene Andrews	25,313	23.33	+1.11
Greens	Renay Wells	14,981	13.81	+1.40
One Nation	Sam Schriever	10,102	9.31	+0.63
United Australia	Tony Moore	7,355	6.78	+3.32
Animal Justice	Vickie Breckenridge	2,730	2.52	+2.52
Total formal votes		108,494	96.85	+1.65
Informal votes		3,530	3.15	−1.65
Turnout		112,024	89.07	−2.89
Two-party-preferred result
Liberal National	Andrew Wallace	63,656	58.67	−4.03
Labor	Judene Andrews	44,838	41.33	+4.03
Liberal National hold		Swing	−4.03	

Alluvial diagram for preference flows in the seat of Fisher in the 2022 federal election. indicates at what stage the winning candidate had over 50% of the votes and was declared the winner.
