= Opinion polling for the next Australian federal election =

In the lead-up to the next Australian federal election, a number of polling companies have conducted opinion polls, often for various news organisations. These polls collect data on parties' primary vote, leaders' favourability, and contain estimations of the two-party-preferred vote.

== Voting intention ==
=== 2026 ===
Date	Polling firm	Client	Interview mode	Sample size	Primary vote						2PP vote		
Date	Polling firm	Client	Interview mode	Sample size	ALP	L/NP		Grn	ONP	Others (Note: Some polls may include support for Independents (Ind) or Community Strong Australia (CSA).)	ALP	L/NP	ONP
Date	Polling firm	Client	Interview mode	Sample size	ALP	Lib	Nat	Grn	ONP	Others	ALP	L/NP	ONP
16–19 Nov	Newspoll	The Australian	Online	1,229	27%	22%		14%	27%	10%	—N/a	—N/a	—N/a
10–17 Nov	YouGov	News24	Online	1,500	24%	22%		15%	26%	13% (Note: 6% Independent, 1% Community Strong Australia and 6% Other)	51%	49%	—N/a
10–17 Nov	YouGov	News24	Online	1,500	24%	22%		15%	26%	13%	56%	—N/a	43%
9–15 Nov	Roy Morgan	—N/a	Online	1,595	24.5%	22.5%	3%	14.5%	23.5%	12%	48%	52%	—N/a
9–15 Nov	Roy Morgan	—N/a	Online	1,595	24.5%	22.5%	3%	14.5%	23.5%	12%	52.5%	—N/a	47.5%
26 Oct – 8 Nov	Roy Morgan	—N/a	Online	2,574	25.5%	19%	3%	15%	24.5%	13%	51%	49%	—N/a
26 Oct – 8 Nov	Roy Morgan	—N/a	Online	2,574	25.5%	19%	3%	15%	24.5%	13%	54%	—N/a	46%
2–7 Nov	Resolve	Sydney Morning Herald/The Age	Telephone & online	2,250	28%	22%		13%	25%	11% (Note: 6% Independent and 5% Other)	—N/a	—N/a	—N/a
2–6 Nov	RedBridge/Accent	Australian Financial Review	Online	1,005	26%	25%		13%	28%	8%	47%	53%	—N/a
2–6 Nov	RedBridge/Accent	Australian Financial Review	Online	1,005	26%	25%		13%	28%	8%	54%	—N/a	46%
28 Oct – 3 Nov	Spectre Strategy	—N/a	Online	2,093	25%	24%		13%	28%	10%	47%	53%	—N/a
28 Oct – 3 Nov	Spectre Strategy	—N/a	Online	2,093	25%	24%		13%	28%	10%	52%	—N/a	48%
27 Oct – 3 Nov	YouGov	News24	Online	1,500	25%	23%		13%	27%	12% (Note: 5% Independent, 2% Community Strong Australia and 5% Other)	50%	50%	—N/a
27 Oct – 3 Nov	YouGov	News24	Online	1,500	25%	23%		13%	27%	12%	54%	—N/a	46%
26–29 Oct	Newspoll	The Australian	Online	1,200	27%	21%		13%	28%	11%	—N/a	—N/a	—N/a
23–26 Oct	DemosAU	Capital Brief	Online	1,500	26%	24%		13%	26%	11%	—N/a	—N/a	—N/a
21–26 Oct	Essential	The Guardian	Online	1,087	28%	23%		12%	28%	10% (Note: 4% Undecided and 6% Other)	44%	52%	—N/a
12–25 Oct	Roy Morgan	—N/a	Online	2,711	26%	21%	2.5%	15.5%	22.5%	12.5%	52.5%	47.5%	—N/a
12–25 Oct	Roy Morgan	—N/a	Online	2,711	26%	21%	2.5%	15.5%	22.5%	12.5%	55%	—N/a	45%
13–20 Oct	YouGov	News24	Online	1,500	24%	23%		14%	27%	12% (Note: 5% Independent, 2% Community Strong Australia and 5% Other)	50%	50%	—N/a
13–20 Oct	YouGov	News24	Online	1,500	24%	23%		14%	27%	12%	53%	—N/a	47%
28 Sep – 11 Oct	Roy Morgan	—N/a	Online	2,655	26%	18.5%	3%	15%	24%	13.5%	53%	47%	—N/a
28 Sep – 11 Oct	Roy Morgan	—N/a	Online	2,655	26%	18.5%	3%	15%	24%	13.5%	54.5%	—N/a	45.5%
6–10 Oct	Resolve	Sydney Morning Herald/The Age	Telephone & online	2,250	29%	23%		12%	25%	11% (Note: 6% Independent and 5% Other)	—N/a	—N/a	—N/a
5–8 Oct	Newspoll	The Australian	Online	1,241	29%	20%		14%	28%	9%	—N/a	—N/a	—N/a
29 Sep–6 Oct	YouGov	News24	Online	1,500	25%	21%		15%	28%	11% (Note: 5% Independent, 1% Community Strong Australia and 5% Other)	52%	48%	—N/a
29 Sep–6 Oct	YouGov	News24	Online	1,500	25%	21%		15%	28%	11%	53%	—N/a	47%
28 Sep–2 Oct	RedBridge/Accent	Australian Financial Review	Online	1,000	28%	21%		11%	29%	11%	46%	54%	—N/a
28 Sep–2 Oct	RedBridge/Accent	Australian Financial Review	Online	1,000	28%	21%		11%	29%	11%	52%	—N/a	48%
28–30 Sep	Larissa Waters resigns as leader of the Greens; David Shoebridge is elected leader												
23–28 Sep	Essential	The Guardian	Online	1,022	29%	22%		12%	25%	12% (Note: 6% Undecided and 6% Other)	48%	46%	—N/a
14–27 Sep	Roy Morgan	—N/a	Online	2,569	26%	20%	2.5%	14.5%	25.5%	11%	52.5%	47.5%	—N/a
14–27 Sep	Roy Morgan	—N/a	Online	2,569	26%	20%	2.5%	14.5%	25.5%	11%	53.5%	—N/a	46.5%
15–21 Sep	YouGov	News24	Online	1,500	26%	21%		14%	27%	12% (Note: 6% Independent, 1% Community Strong Australia and 5% Other)	52%	48%	—N/a
15–21 Sep	YouGov	News24	Online	1,500	26%	21%		14%	27%	12%	55%	—N/a	45%
14–20 Sep	Roy Morgan	—N/a	Online	1,561	25%	21.5%		15.5%	25.5%	12.5%	53%	47%	—N/a
14–20 Sep	Roy Morgan	—N/a	Online	1,561	25%	21.5%		15.5%	25.5%	12.5%	54%	—N/a	46%
4 Aug – 19 Sep	DemosAU (MRP)	Capital Brief	Online	9,740	27%	22%		13%	26%	12%	—N/a	—N/a	—N/a
14–17 Sep	Newspoll	The Australian	Online	1,244	27%	19%		13%	30%	11%	—N/a	—N/a	—N/a
10–14 Sep	DemosAU	Capital Brief	Online	1,583	28%	20%		13%	26%	13%	—N/a	—N/a	—N/a
7–13 Sep	Roy Morgan	—N/a	Online	1,583	25%	19%	2.5%	16%	25%	12.5%	55%	45%	—N/a
7–13 Sep	Roy Morgan	—N/a	Online	1,583	25%	19%	2.5%	16%	25%	12.5%	54.5%	—N/a	45.5%
6–12 Sep	Resolve	Sydney Morning Herald/The Age	Telephone & online	2,256	28%	24%		11%	27%	9% (Note: 6% Independent and 3% Other)	—N/a	—N/a	—N/a
1–8 Sep	YouGov	News24	Online	1,500	26%	18%		12%	30%	14% (Note: 7% Independent, 2% Community Strong Australia and 5% Other)	52%	48%	—N/a
1–8 Sep	YouGov	News24	Online	1,500	26%	18%		12%	30%	14%	53%	—N/a	47%
31 Aug – 6 Sep	Roy Morgan	—N/a	Online	1,541	27%	17%	4.5%	14.5%	26.5%	10.5%	53%	47%	—N/a
31 Aug – 6 Sep	Roy Morgan	—N/a	Online	1,541	27%	17%	4.5%	14.5%	26.5%	10.5%	53.5%	—N/a	46.5%
26–31 Aug	Essential	The Guardian	Online	1,050	26%	26%		13%	23%	11% (Note: Undecided 5% and Other 6%)	45%	50%	—N/a
24–30 Aug	Roy Morgan	—N/a	Online	1,585	29.5%	18%	2.5%	13.5%	23.5%	13%	56%	44%	—N/a
24–30 Aug	Roy Morgan	—N/a	Online	1,585	29.5%	18%	2.5%	13.5%	23.5%	13%	55.5%	—N/a	44.5%
24–28 Aug	Newspoll	The Australian	Online	1,243	29%	19%		13%	30%	9%	—N/a	—N/a	—N/a
24–28 Aug	RedBridge/Accent	Australian Financial Review	Online	1,006	29%	22%		12%	28%	9%	48%	52%	—N/a
24–28 Aug	RedBridge/Accent	Australian Financial Review	Online	1,006	29%	22%		12%	28%	9%	52%	—N/a	48%
18–24 Aug	YouGov	News24	Online	1,510	29%	21%		12%	26%	12% (Note: 5% Independent, 2% Community Strong Australia and 5% Other)	53%	47%	—N/a
18–24 Aug	YouGov	News24	Online	1,510	29%	21%		12%	26%	12%	56%	—N/a	44%
17–23 Aug	Roy Morgan	—N/a	Online	1,508	27%	18.5%	2.5%	14%	27%	11%	52%	48%	—N/a
17–23 Aug	Roy Morgan	—N/a	Online	1,508	27%	18.5%	2.5%	14%	27%	11%	53%	—N/a	47%
18–20 Aug	DemosAU	Capital Brief	Online	1,562	26%	25%		12%	24%	13%	—N/a	—N/a	—N/a
11–16 Aug	Roy Morgan	—N/a	Online	1,576	28.5%	21%	2.5%	12.5%	25%	10.5%	52%	48%	—N/a
11–16 Aug	Roy Morgan	—N/a	Online	1,576	28.5%	21%	2.5%	12.5%	25%	10.5%	53%	—N/a	47%
9–15 Aug	Resolve	Sydney Morning Herald/The Age	Telephone & online	2,256	28%	23%		12%	26%	11% (Note: 7% Independent and 4% Other)	—N/a	—N/a	—N/a
4–10 Aug	YouGov	News24	Online	1,500	28%	22%		12%	24%	14% (Note: 5% Independent, 2% Community Strong Australia and 7% Other)	52%	48%	—N/a
4–10 Aug	YouGov	News24	Online	1,500	28%	22%		12%	24%	14%	56%	—N/a	44%
3–9 Aug	Roy Morgan	—N/a	Online	1,647	25.5%	18.5%	3.5%	15.5%	26%	11%	53%	47%	—N/a
3–9 Aug	Roy Morgan	—N/a	Online	1,647	25.5%	18.5%	3.5%	15.5%	26%	11%	53%	—N/a	47%
3–7 Aug	Newspoll	The Australian	Online	1,242	29%	18%		14%	29%	10%	—N/a	—N/a	—N/a
27 Jul–2 Aug	Roy Morgan	—N/a	Online	1,531	27.5%	20%	3.5%	15%	24%	10%	52%	48%	—N/a
27 Jul–2 Aug	Roy Morgan	—N/a	Online	1,531	27.5%	20%	3.5%	15%	24%	10%	54%	—N/a	46%
Late July	Agenda C Synesis	Combat Antisemitism Movement	Online	1,232	32%	19%		12%	26%	14% (Note: 8% Independent, 4% Other and 2% Undecided)	—N/a	—N/a	—N/a
27–30 Jul	RedBridge/Accent	Australian Financial Review	Online	1,001	29%	22%		10%	31%	8%	48%	52%	—N/a
27–30 Jul	RedBridge/Accent	Australian Financial Review	Online	1,001	29%	22%		10%	31%	8%	53%	—N/a	47%
21–28 Jul	YouGov	News24	Online	1,500	28%	22%		13%	25%	12% (Note: 6% Independent. 1% Community Strong Australia and 5% Other)	53%	47%	—N/a
21–28 Jul	YouGov	News24	Online	1,500	28%	22%		13%	25%	12%	56%	—N/a	44%
22–27 Jul	Essential	The Guardian	Online	1,060	31%	22%		12%	25%	10% (Note: 6% Other and 4% Undecided)	48%	47%	—N/a
20–26 Jul	Roy Morgan	—N/a	Online	1,643	27.5%	18.5%	3.5%	14%	25.5%	11%	54%	46%	—N/a
20–26 Jul	Roy Morgan	—N/a	Online	1,643	27.5%	18.5%	3.5%	14%	25.5%	11%	53.5%	—N/a	46.5%
11–23 Jul	Spectre Strategy	—N/a	Online	1,434	28%	23%		12%	26%	11%	51%	49%	—N/a
11–23 Jul	Spectre Strategy	—N/a	Online	1,434	28%	23%		12%	26%	11%	54%	—N/a	46%
13–19 Jul	Roy Morgan	—N/a	Online	1,679	27.5%	20.5%	2.5%	14%	22.5%	13%	56%	44%	—N/a
13–19 Jul	Roy Morgan	—N/a	Online	1,679	27.5%	20.5%	2.5%	14%	22.5%	13%	55%	—N/a	45%
13–16 Jul	Newspoll	The Australian	Online	1,238	30%	19%		12%	30%	9%	—N/a	—N/a	—N/a
7–14 Jul	YouGov	Sky News Australia	Online	1,500	28%	20%		12%	26%	14% (Note: 6% Independent, 2% Community Strong Australia and 6% Other)	53%	47%	—N/a
7–14 Jul	YouGov	Sky News Australia	Online	1,500	28%	20%		12%	26%	14%	56%	—N/a	44%
6–12 Jul	Roy Morgan	—N/a	Online	1,612	27.5%	17.5%	2.5%	12.5%	28%	12%	54%	46%	—N/a
6–12 Jul	Roy Morgan	—N/a	Online	1,612	27.5%	17.5%	2.5%	12.5%	28%	12%	52.5%	—N/a	47.5%
6–11 Jul	Resolve	Sydney Morning Herald/The Age	Telephone & online	2,252	28%	23%		12%	26%	11% (Note: 6% Independent and 5% Other)	—N/a	—N/a	—N/a
3–8 Jul	DemosAU	Capital Brief	Online	2,694	26%	21%		14%	29%	10%	—N/a	—N/a	—N/a
28 Jun – 5 Jul	Roy Morgan	—N/a	Online	1,584	28%	19%	2.5%	14%	22.5%	14%	55%	45%	—N/a
28 Jun – 5 Jul	Roy Morgan	—N/a	Online	1,584	28%	19%	2.5%	14%	22.5%	14%	56%	—N/a	44%
23–30 Jun	YouGov	Sky News Australia	Online	1,502	29%	17%		13%	30%	11%	54%	46%	—N/a
23–30 Jun	YouGov	Sky News Australia	Online	1,502	29%	17%		13%	30%	11%	54%	—N/a	46%
24–29 Jun	Essential	The Guardian	Online	1,017	30%	23%		10%	26%	10% (Note: 5% Other and 5% Undecided)	46%	48%	—N/a
22–28 Jun	Roy Morgan	—N/a	Online	1,639	28%	19%	2.5%	13%	26%	11.5%	53.5%	46.5%	—N/a
22–28 Jun	Roy Morgan	—N/a	Online	1,639	28%	19%	2.5%	13%	26%	11.5%	53%	—N/a	47%
22–26 Jun	RedBridge/Accent	Australian Financial Review	Online	1,006	30%	18%		14%	29%	9%	54%	46%	—N/a
22–26 Jun	RedBridge/Accent	Australian Financial Review	Online	1,006	30%	18%		14%	29%	9%	56%	—N/a	44%
22–25 Jun	Newspoll	The Australian	Online	1,235	33%	17%		13%	29%	8%	—N/a	—N/a	—N/a
15–21 Jun	Roy Morgan	—N/a	Online	1,575	27%	15%	2.5%	13.5%	31.5%	10.5%	54%	46%	—N/a
15–21 Jun	Roy Morgan	—N/a	Online	1,575	27%	15%	2.5%	13.5%	31.5%	10.5%	51%	—N/a	49%
16–18 Jun	DemosAU	Capital Brief	Online	1,497	27%	18%		13%	30%	12%	—N/a	—N/a	—N/a
9–16 Jun	YouGov	Sky News Australia	Online	1,500	26%	21%		13%	28%	12% (Note: 7% Independent and 5% Other)	52%	48%	—N/a
9–16 Jun	YouGov	Sky News Australia	Online	1,500	26%	21%		13%	28%	12%	52%	—N/a	48%
8–14 Jun	Roy Morgan	—N/a	Online	1,583	28%	15%	2%	14%	29.5%	11.5%	54.5%	45.5%	—N/a
8–14 Jun	Roy Morgan	—N/a	Online	1,583	28%	15%	2%	14%	29.5%	11.5%	53%	—N/a	47%
8–13 Jun	Resolve	Sydney Morning Herald/The Age	Telephone & online	1,801	28%	20%		12%	29%	12%	—N/a	—N/a	—N/a
1–7 Jun	Roy Morgan	—N/a	Online	1,631	26%	14.5%	3%	15.5%	29.5%	11.5%	56%	44%	—N/a
1–7 Jun	Roy Morgan	—N/a	Online	1,631	26%	14.5%	3%	15.5%	29.5%	11.5%	53.5%	—N/a	46.5%
1–4 Jun	Newspoll	The Australian	Online	1,240	30%	18%		11%	31%	10%	—N/a	—N/a	—N/a
26 May – 2 Jun	YouGov	Sky News Australia	Online	1,471	26%	20%		13%	29%	12% (Note: 6% Independent and 6% Other)	51.5%	48.5%	—N/a
26 May – 2 Jun	YouGov	Sky News Australia	Online	1,471	26%	20%		13%	29%	12%	52.5%	—N/a	47.5%
25–31 May	Roy Morgan	—N/a	Online	1,542	27%	17.5%	2.5%	13.5%	27%	12.5%	55.5%	44.5%	—N/a
25–31 May	Roy Morgan	—N/a	Online	1,542	27%	17.5%	2.5%	13.5%	27%	12.5%	53.5%	—N/a	46.5%
25–28 May	RedBridge/Accent	Australian Financial Review	Online	1,005	28%	20%		12%	31%	9%	51%	49%	—N/a
25–28 May	RedBridge/Accent	Australian Financial Review	Online	1,005	28%	20%		12%	31%	9%	51%	—N/a	49%
25–26 May	Fox & Hedgehog	The Daily Telegraph	Online	1,700	29%	25%		10%	27%	9%	49%	51%	—N/a
25–26 May	Fox & Hedgehog	The Daily Telegraph	Online	1,700	29%	25%		10%	27%	9%	54%	—N/a	46%
25–26 May	Fox & Hedgehog	The Daily Telegraph	Online	1,700	29%	25%		10%	27%	9%	—N/a	58%	42%
22–26 May	Agenda C Synesis	Fair Go Australia	Online	1,232	29%	18%		10%	24%	19% (Note: 6% Independent, 1% Other and 12% Undecided)	—N/a	—N/a	—N/a
20–25 May	Essential	The Guardian	Online	1,027	29%	23%		11%	28%	9% (Note: 5% Other and 4% Undecided)	48%	47%	—N/a
18–24 May	Roy Morgan	—N/a	Online	1,613	27.5%	21%	2%	13.5%	25.5%	10.5%	53%	47%	—N/a
18–24 May	Roy Morgan	—N/a	Online	1,613	27.5%	21%	2%	13.5%	25.5%	10.5%	53.5%	—N/a	46.5%
15–20 May	DemosAU	Capital Brief	Online	1,502	26%	23%		13%	28%	10%	—N/a	—N/a	—N/a
12–19 May	YouGov	Sky News Australia	Online	1,500	28%	23%		13%	25%	11% (Note: 5% Independent and 6% Other)	52%	48%	—N/a
12–19 May	YouGov	Sky News Australia	Online	1,500	28%	23%		13%	25%	11%	53%	—N/a	47%
14–17 May	Newspoll	The Australian	Online	1,252	31%	20%		12%	27%	10%	—N/a	—N/a	—N/a
11–17 May	Roy Morgan	—N/a	Online	1,668	29.5%	21%	3%	11.5%	24.5%	10.5%	54%	46%	—N/a
11–17 May	Roy Morgan	—N/a	Online	1,668	29.5%	21%	3%	11.5%	24.5%	10.5%	54%	—N/a	46%
13–16 May	Resolve	Sydney Morning Herald/The Age	Telephone & online	1,800	29%	23%		12%	24%	12%	—N/a	—N/a	—N/a
13–15 May	Freshwater	The Chronicle	Online	1,384	29%	25%		11%	26%	9%	—N/a	—N/a	—N/a
13–14 May	Roy Morgan	—N/a	SMS	2,348	28.5%	16.5%		11.5%	32%	11.5%	55%	45%	—N/a
13–14 May	Roy Morgan	—N/a	SMS	2,348	28.5%	16.5%		11.5%	32%	11.5%	51%	—N/a	49%
13–14 May	Roy Morgan	—N/a	SMS	2,348	28.5%	16.5%		11.5%	32%	11.5%	—N/a	49%	51%
29 Apr – 14 May	RedBridge/Accent (MRP)	Australian Financial Review	Online	6,015	31%	21%		11%	28%	9%	—N/a	—N/a	—N/a
13 May	Wolf & Smith	Amplify	Online	1,002	30%	24%		11%	22%	13%	—N/a	—N/a	—N/a
12 May	The 2026 federal budget is presented by Treasurer Jim Chalmers												
4–10 May	Roy Morgan	—N/a	Online	1,605	30.5%	21%	4%	11.5%	22%	11%	53.5%	46.5%	—N/a
9 May	Farrer by-election (ONP gain)												
28 Apr–5 May	YouGov	Sky News Australia	Online	1,500	30%	21%		14%	24%	11%	54%	46%	—N/a
28 Apr–5 May	YouGov	Sky News Australia	Online	1,500	30%	21%		14%	24%	11%	57%	—N/a	43%
27 Apr–3 May	Roy Morgan	—N/a	Online	1,681	29.5%	21%	3%	13%	21.5%	12%	54.5%	45.5%	—N/a
24–30 Apr	RedBridge/Accent	Australian Financial Review	Online	1,014	31%	22%		13%	27%	7%	54%	46%	—N/a
24–30 Apr	RedBridge/Accent	Australian Financial Review	Online	1,014	31%	22%		13%	27%	7%	55%	—N/a	45%
28–30 Apr	Freshwater	The Courier Mail	Online	1,046	32%	23%		12%	25%	8%	53%	47%	—N/a
22–27 Apr	Essential	The Guardian	Online	1,002	30%	24%		11%	25%	10% (Note: 5% Other and 5% Undecided)	47%	49%	—N/a
20–26 Apr	Roy Morgan	—N/a	Online	1,587	30%	19%	3.5%	14%	22.5%	11%	54.5%	45.5%	—N/a
14–21 Apr	YouGov	Sky News Australia	Online	1,500	27%	20%		14%	27%	12% (Note: 5% Independent and 7% Other)	53%	47%	—N/a
14–21 Apr	YouGov	Sky News Australia	Online	1,500	27%	20%		14%	27%	12%	52%	—N/a	48%
13–19 Apr	Roy Morgan	—N/a	Online	1,620	30.5%	19.5%	3.5%	13.5%	21.5%	11.5%	55.5%	44.5%	—N/a
13–16 Apr	Newspoll	The Australian	Online	1,235	31%	21%		13%	24%	11%	—N/a	—N/a	—N/a
13–18 Apr	Resolve	Sydney Morning Herald/The Age	Telephone & online	1,807	32%	23%		12%	22%	11%	55%	45%	—N/a
9–14 Apr	DemosAU	Capital Brief	Online	1,439	26%	23%		13%	26%	12%	—N/a	—N/a	—N/a
6–12 Apr	Roy Morgan	—N/a	Online	1,512	30%	19.5%	3%	12.5%	24.5%	10.5%	56%	44%	—N/a
2–8 Apr	Spectre Strategy	—N/a	Online	1,002	28%	24%		12%	26%	10%	51%	49%	—N/a
2–8 Apr	Spectre Strategy	—N/a	Online	1,002	28%	24%		12%	26%	10%	52%	—N/a	48%
31 Mar – 7 Apr	YouGov	Sky News Australia	Online	1,500	30%	20%		13%	25%	13% (Note: 6% Independent and 7% Other)	55%	45%	—N/a
31 Mar – 7 Apr	YouGov	Sky News Australia	Online	1,500	30%	20%		13%	25%	13%	55%	—N/a	45%
30 Mar–5 Apr	Roy Morgan	—N/a	Online	1,411	30.5%	20%	4%	12%	21.5%	12%	56%	44%	—N/a
27–29 Mar	Freshwater	News Australia	Online	1,050	32%	23%		12%	25%	8%	51%	49%	—N/a
27–29 Mar	Freshwater	News Australia	Online	1,050	32%	23%		12%	25%	8%	55%	—N/a	45%
23–29 Mar	Roy Morgan	—N/a	Online	1,562	30%	19.5%	3%	13.5%	23.5%	10.5%	56.5%	43.5%	—N/a
23–27 Mar	RedBridge/Accent	Australian Financial Review	Online	1,003	32%	17%		13%	29%	9%	53%	47%	—N/a
23–27 Mar	RedBridge/Accent	Australian Financial Review	Online	1,003	32%	17%		13%	29%	9%	53%	—N/a	47%
23–26 Mar	Newspoll	The Australian	Online	1,232	31%	21%		12%	26%	10%	—N/a	—N/a	—N/a
24–25 Mar	Fox & Hedgehog	—N/a	Online	1,810	30%	23%		13%	23%	11%	51%	49%	—N/a
24–25 Mar	Fox & Hedgehog	—N/a	Online	1,810	30%	23%		13%	23%	11%	56%	—N/a	44%
24–25 Mar	Fox & Hedgehog	—N/a	Online	1,810	30%	23%		13%	23%	11%	—	60%	40%
17–24 Mar	YouGov	Sky News Australia	Online	1,500	29%	19%		13%	27%	12%	54%	46%	—N/a
17–24 Mar	YouGov	Sky News Australia	Online	1,500	29%	19%		13%	27%	12%	53%	—N/a	47%
18–23 Mar	Essential	—N/a	Online	1,008	31%	24%		10%	24%	12% (Note: 5% Other and 7% Undecided)	46%	47%	—N/a
16–22 Mar	Roy Morgan	—N/a	Online	1,664	27%	21.5%	4%	13.5%	23.5%	10.5%	52.5%	47.5%	—N/a
21 Mar	South Australian state election (ALP hold)												
12–19 Mar	YouGov	The Australia Institute	Online	1,502	28%	21%		13%	26%	11%	—N/a	—N/a	—N/a
9–15 Mar	Roy Morgan	—N/a	Online	1,649	28.5%	20.5%	3.5%	12.5%	22.5%	12.5%	54%	46%	—N/a
9–14 Mar	Resolve	Sydney Morning Herald/The Age	Telephone & online	1,803	29%	22%		12%	24%	13% (Note: 8% Independent and 5% Other)	—N/a	—N/a	—N/a
11 Mar	David Littleproud resigns as leader of the National Party; Matt Canavan is elected leader												
3–10 Mar	YouGov	Sky News Australia	Online	1,500	30%	19%		13%	26%	12% (Note: 5% Independent and 7% Other)	55%	45%	—N/a
3–10 Mar	YouGov	Sky News Australia	Online	1,500	30%	19%		13%	26%	12%	55%	—N/a	45%
2–8 Mar	Roy Morgan	—N/a	Online	1,532	26.5%	22.5%		14.5%	23.5%	13%	54.5%	45.5%	—N/a
2 Mar	The Strait of Hormuz is closed as part of the Iran war, triggering a fuel crisis in Australia (Note: Australia imports little oil directly from the strait, but its supply of refined oil comes from countries who are themselves dependent on crude oil through the Strait of Hormuz.)												
13 Jan – 3 Mar	DemosAU (MRP)	—N/a	Online	8,424	29%	21%		12%	27%	11%	—N/a	—N/a	—N/a
23 Feb – 1 Mar	Roy Morgan	—N/a	Online	1,554	30.5%	23.5%		11.5%	22%	12.5%	56%	44%	—N/a
23–27 Feb	RedBridge/Accent	Australian Financial Review	Online	1,006	32%	13% (Note: 4% for the Liberal National Party of Queensland vote distributed between both Liberal and National)	2%	12%	28%	9%	54%	46%	—N/a
23–27 Feb	RedBridge/Accent	Australian Financial Review	Online	1,006	32%	13%	2%	12%	28%	9%	54%	—N/a	46%
23–26 Feb	Newspoll	The Australian	Online	1,237	32%	20%		11%	27%	10%	—N/a	—N/a	—N/a
17–24 Feb	YouGov	Sky News Australia	Online	1,500	29%	15% (Note: 5% for the Liberal National Party of Queensland vote distributed between both Liberal and National)	2%	13%	24%	12%	53%	47%	—N/a
17–24 Feb	YouGov	Sky News Australia	Online	1,500	29%	15%	2%	13%	24%	12%	56%	—N/a	44%
18–23 Feb	Essential	The Guardian	Online	1,002	30%	26%		11%	22%	11% (Note: 7% Other and 4% Undecided)	49.5%	50.5% (Note: Two-party-preferred vote calculated after the exclusion of "undecided".)	—N/a
16–22 Feb	Roy Morgan	—N/a	Online	1,649	31%	24%		12.5%	20.5%	12%	54%	46%	—N/a
16–20 Feb	DemosAU	Capital Brief	Online	1,551	29%	21%		12%	28%	10%	—N/a	—N/a	—N/a
17–19 Feb	Fox & Hedgehog	The Daily Telegraph	Online	1,625	30%	24%		12%	25%	9%	51%	49%	—N/a
17–19 Feb	Fox & Hedgehog	The Daily Telegraph	Online	1,625	30%	24%		12%	25%	9%	53%	—N/a	47%
17–19 Feb	Fox & Hedgehog	The Daily Telegraph	Online	1,625	30%	24%		12%	25%	9%	—N/a	57%	43%
13–16 Feb	Roy Morgan	—N/a	Online	526	32%	23.5%		12.5%	21.5%	10.5%	55%	45%	—N/a
8–14 Feb	Resolve (Note: Respondents were asked: "If the Liberal Party did vote to change their leader from Sussan Ley to Angus Taylor this week, who would then receive your first preference if an election were held with Angus Taylor as the new Liberal leader?")	Sydney Morning Herald/The Age	Telephone & online	1,717	32%	23%		11%	23%	12%	55%	45%	—N/a
13 Feb	Angus Taylor becomes leader of the Opposition after defeating Sussan Ley in a leadership spill												
9–13 Feb	Roy Morgan	—N/a	Online	1,216	30.5%	20%		13%	25%	11.5%	58.5%	41.5%	—N/a
8–12 Feb	Resolve	Sydney Morning Herald/The Age	Telephone & online	1,717	31%	20%		12%	25%	13%	55%	45%	—N/a
6–12 Feb	RedBridge/Accent	The Australia Institute	Online	2,010	34%	17%		11%	28%	10%	—N/a	—N/a	—N/a
3–10 Feb	YouGov	Sky News Australia	Online	1,561	30%	14%	1%	12%	28%	11%	54%	46%	—N/a
3–10 Feb	YouGov	Sky News Australia	Online	1,561	30%	14%	1%	12%	28%	11%	55%	—N/a	45%
8 Feb	The Liberal–National Coalition is reunited												
5–8 Feb	Newspoll	The Australian	Online	1,234	33%	15%	3%	12%	27%	10%	—N/a	—N/a	—N/a
2–8 Feb	Roy Morgan	—N/a	Online	1,584	28.5%	22.5%		13.5%	24.5%	11%	53.5%	46.5%	—N/a
26 Jan – 1 Feb	Roy Morgan	—N/a	Online	1,401	30.5%	18%	2.5%	12.5%	25%	11.5%	56%	44%	—N/a
22–29 Jan	RedBridge/Accent	Australian Financial Review	Online	1,003	34%	13%	2%	11%	26%	10%	56%	44%	—N/a
20–27 Jan	YouGov	Sky News Australia	Online	1,500	31%	14%	2%	12%	25%	12%	55%	45%	—N/a
20–27 Jan	YouGov	Sky News Australia	Online	1,500	31%	14%	2%	12%	25%	12%	57%	—N/a	43%
19–25 Jan	Roy Morgan	—N/a	Online	1,933	30.5%	20%	2.5%	13%	22.5%	11.5%	56.5%	43.5%	—N/a
20–23 Jan	Essential	The Guardian	Online	1,022	31%	25%		9%	22%	13% (Note: 0% Trumpet of Patriots, 7% Other and 6% Undecided)	—N/a	—N/a	—N/a›
22 Jan	The Liberal–National Coalition is dissolved												
13–21 Jan	DemosAU	Capital Brief	Online	1,933	30%	21%		13%	24%	12%	—N/a	—N/a	—N/a
16–18 Jan	Freshwater	Herald Sun	Online	1,050	33%	28%		11%	19%	9%	53%	47%	—N/a
16–18 Jan	Freshwater	Herald Sun	Online	1,050	33%	28%		11%	19%	9%	57%	—N/a	43%
12–18 Jan	Roy Morgan	—N/a	Online	1,630	28.5%	22%	2%	13.5%	21%	13%	53.5%	46.5%	—N/a
12–16 Jan	Resolve	Sydney Morning Herald/The Age	Telephone & online	1,800	30%	28%		10%	18%	14% (Note: 7% Independent and 7% Other)	52%	48%	—N/a
12–16 Jan	Newspoll	The Australian	Online	1,224	32%	21%		12%	22%	13%	55%	45%	—N/a
5–11 Jan	Roy Morgan	—N/a	Online	1,676	30%	28%	2.5%	13.5%	15%	11%	52%	48%	—N/a
5–6 Jan	Fox & Hedgehog	The Daily Telegraph	Online	1,608	29%	25%		14%	21%	11%	53%	47%	—N/a
5–6 Jan	Fox & Hedgehog	The Daily Telegraph	Online	1,608	29%	25%		14%	21%	11%	56%	—N/a	44%
5–6 Jan	Fox & Hedgehog	The Daily Telegraph	Online	1,608	29%	25%		14%	21%	11%	—N/a	63%	37%
5–6 Jan	DemosAU (Note: DemosAU produced an estimated ALP/ONP TPP using the following assumptions: L/NP preferences would flow 82.9% to ONP and 17.1% ALP (as in the 2025 election for the Division of Hunter).; GRN preferences would flow 88.2% to ALP and 11.8% ONP (as in the 2025 federal election between the ALP and L/NP, but replacing L/NP with ONP).; All other preferences split evenly between ALP and ONP.)	Capital Brief	Online	1,027	29%	23%		12%	23%	13%	52%	48%	—N/a
5–6 Jan	DemosAU	Capital Brief	Online	1,027	29%	23%		12%	23%	13%	50%	—N/a	50%
3 May 2025	Election				34.6%	31.8%		12.2%	6.4%	15% (Note: 7.6% Independents and 7.4% Other)	55.2%	44.8%	—

=== 2025 ===
Date	Polling firm	Client	Interview mode	Sample size	Primary vote						2PP vote	
Date	Polling firm	Client	Interview mode	Sample size	ALP	L/NP	Grn	ONP	Ind	Others	ALP	L/NP
16–23 Dec	YouGov	Sky News Australia	Online	1,869	30%	24%	13%	20%	7%	6%	—N/a	—N/a
17–20 Dec	Resolve	Sydney Morning Herald/The Age	Telephone & Online	1,010	32%	28%	12%	16%	8%	4%	54%	46%
8–14 Dec	Roy Morgan	—N/a	Online	1,574	30.5%	27.5%	13%	17%	12%		54.5%	45.5%
5–12 Dec	RedBridge/Accent	Australian Financial Review	Online	1,012	35%	26%	13%	17%	9%		56%	44%
8 Dec	Barnaby Joyce joins One Nation											
3–8 Dec	Essential		Online	1,300	34%	26%	10%	17%	12% (Note: 5% undecided)		52.1%	47.9%
2–7 Dec	Resolve	Sydney Morning Herald/The Age	Telephone & Online	1,800	35%	26%	11%	14%	8%	6%	55%	45%
26 Nov – 2 Dec	YouGov	Sky News Australia	Online	1,605	32%	24%	13%	19%	6%	6%	—N/a	—N/a
27 Nov	Barnaby Joyce resigns from the Nationals to sit as an independent											
7–26 Nov	RedBridge/Accent	Australian Financial Review	Online	4,775	35%	26%	10%	18%	11%		54%	46%
19–24 Nov	Essential	—N/a	Online	1,020	36%	27%	11%	15%	13% (Note: 6% undecided)		53.2%	46.8%
17–20 Nov	Newspoll	The Australian	Online	1,245	36%	24%	13%	15%	12%		58%	42%
12–17 Nov	YouGov (MRP)	Climate Council	Online	3,530	34%	26%	12%	18%	5%	5%	—N/a	—N/a
4–17 Nov	Spectre Strategy	The Daily Telegraph	Online	1,007	33%	25%	12.5%	17.5%	12%		53%	47%
20 Oct – 16 Nov	Roy Morgan	—N/a	Online	5,248	33%	27%	12.5%	14%	13.5%		56.5%	43.5%
7–13 Nov	RedBridge/Accent	Australian Financial Review	Online	1,011	38%	24% (Note: 20% for the Liberal Party and 4% for the National Party (with the Liberal National Party of Queensland vote distributed between both).)	9%	18%	11%		56%	44%
5 Oct – 11 Nov	DemosAU (MRP)	—N/a	Online	6,928	33%	24%	13%	17%	13%		56%	44%
4–8 Nov	Resolve	Sydney Morning Herald/The Age	Telephone & Online	1,804	33%	29%	12%	12%	7%	6%	53%	47%
27–30 Oct	Newspoll	The Australian	Online	1,265	36%	24%	11%	15%	14%		57%	43%
23–30 Oct	YouGov	The Australia Institute	Online	4,578	33%	27%	12%	13%	7%	8%	56%	44%
22–27 Oct	Essential	—N/a	Online	1,041	36%	26%	9%	15%	14%		53.2%	46.8%
15–20 Oct	Freshwater	The Daily Telegraph	Online	1,530	33%	31%	14%	10%	11%		55%	45%
22 Sep – 19 Oct	Roy Morgan	—N/a	Online	4,908	35%	27%	13%	12%	13%		57%	43%
7–12 Oct	Resolve	Sydney Morning Herald/The Age	Telephone & Online	1,800	34%	28%	11%	12%	9%	7%	55%	45%
25 Sep – 7 Oct	RedBridge/Accent	Australian Financial Review	Online	1,997	34%	29%	11%	14%	12%		54%	46%
29 Sep – 2 Oct	Newspoll	The Australian	Online	1,264	37%	28%	12%	11%	12%		57%	43%
25–30 Sep	YouGov	—N/a	Online	1,329	34%	27%	12%	12%	8%	14% (Note: 7% undecided)	56%	44%
24–29 Sep	Essential	—N/a	Online	1,001	35%	27%	11%	13%	14%		53.7%	46.3%
25 Aug – 21 Sep	Roy Morgan	—N/a	Online	5,084	34%	30%	12%	9.5%	14.5%		55.5%	44.5%
9–13 Sep	Resolve	Sydney Morning Herald/The Age	Telephone & Online	1,800	35%	27%	11%	12%	9%	6%	55%	45%
8–11 Sep	Newspoll	The Australian	Online	1,283	36%	27%	13%	10%	14%		58%	42%
19 Aug – 8 Sep	RedBridge/Accent	Australian Financial Review	Online	5,326	35%	30%	11%	11%	13%		53.5%	46.5%
28 Jul – 24 Aug	Roy Morgan	—N/a	Online	5,001	34%	30%	12%	9%	15%		56.5%	43.5%
9–16 Aug	Resolve	Sydney Morning Herald/The Age	Telephone & Online	1,800	37%	29%	12%	9%	8%	6%	59%	41%
11–14 Aug	Newspoll	The Australian	Online	1,283	36%	30%	12%	9%	13%		56%	44%
18–30 Jul	Wolf & Smith	Australian Financial Review	Online	5,000	36%	30%	—N/a	—N/a	—N/a	—N/a	57%	43%
30 Jun – 27 Jul	Roy Morgan	—N/a	Online	5,159	36.5%	31%	12%	7%	13.5%		57%	43%
13–18 Jul	Resolve	Sydney Morning Herald/The Age	Telephone & Online	2,311	35%	29%	12%	8%	8%	8%	56%	44%
14–17 Jul	Newspoll	The Australian	Online	1,264	36%	29%	12%	8%	15%		57%	43%
5–6 Jul	DemosAU	—N/a	Online	1,199	36%	26%	14%	9%	15%		59%	41%
27 Jun – 1 Jul	Spectre Strategy	—N/a	Online	1,001	35.9%	31%	12.8%	7.9%	12.3%		56.5%	43.5%
19–30 Jun	RedBridge/Accent	Australian Financial Review	Online	4,036	37%	31%	11%	9%	12%		55.5%	44.5%
23–29 Jun	Roy Morgan	—N/a	Online	1,522	36.5%	30.5%	12%	8.5%	12.5%		57.5%	42.5%
2–22 Jun	Roy Morgan	—N/a	Online	3,957	37.5%	31%	12%	6%	13.5%		58%	42%
5 May – 1 Jun	Roy Morgan	—N/a	Online	5,128	37%	31%	11.5%	6%	14.5%		58.5%	41.5%
20–28 May	The Liberal/National Coalition is dissolved											
13 May	Sussan Ley elected as Leader of the Liberal Party and the Opposition, replacing Peter Dutton											
3 May	Election				34.6%	31.8%	12.2%	6.4%	7.4%	7.6%	55.2%	44.8%

== Electorate projections ==
76 seats needed for a majority.

Date	Polling firm	Client	Projection type	Sample size	Seat tally								Majority
Date	Polling firm	Client	Projection type	Sample size	ALP	L/NP	Grn	ONP	CSA	CA	KAP	Ind	Majority
4 Aug – 19 Sep 2026	DemosAU	—N/a	MRP	9,740	84	34	0	24	2	1	1	4	ALP 9
27 May – 11 Jul 2026	DemosAU	—N/a	MRP	9,343	68	13	3	60	2	1	0	3	Hung (ALP 8 short)
29 Apr – 14 May 2026	RedBridge/Accent	Australian Financial Review	MRP	6,015	76	12	0	53	—N/a	0	1	8	ALP 1
13 Jan – 3 Mar 2026	DemosAU	—N/a	MRP	8,424	83	9	1	52	—N/a	0	0	5	ALP 8
5 Oct – 11 Nov 2025	DemosAU	—N/a	MRP	6,928	98	29	0	12	—N/a	1	1	9	ALP 23
3 May 2025	Election				94	43	1	0	—	1	1	10	ALP 19

== Individual electorate polling ==
These tables exclude projections from MRP polls.

=== New South Wales ===
==== Bradfield ====
Date	Firm	Sample size	Margin of error	Primary vote						2CP vote		
Date	Firm	Sample size	Margin of error	Lib	Boele (Ind)	ALP	Grn	ONP	Oth	Boele (Ind)	Lib	ALP
Jun 2025	uComms (Note: Commissioned by Climate 200.)	1,147	—	37.3%	33.0%	—	—	—	—	—	—	—
3 May 2025	2025 federal election			38.0%	27.0%	20.3%	6.7%	1.6%	6.4%	50.0%	50.0%	—

==== Farrer ====
Date	Firm	Sample size	Margin of error	Primary vote							2CP vote		
Date	Firm	Sample size	Margin of error	Lib	Nat	Milthorpe (Ind)	ALP	ONP	Grn	Oth	Lib	Milthorpe (Ind)	ONP
9 May 2026	2026 Farrer by-election			12.4%	9.8%	28.2%	—	39.5%	2.3%	7.8%	—	42.5%	57.5%
9–10 Apr 2026	uComms (Note: Commissioned by Michelle Milthorpe.)	1,116	≈±3%	16.1%	7.1%	30.0%	—N/a	30.9%	3.8%	12.1% (Note: Including 7.9% undecided.)	—N/a	47.3%	52.7%
5–6 Mar 2026	uComms (Note: Commissioned by The Australia Institute.)	1,281	±2.73%	19.1%	5.2%	23.3%	9.0%	28.7%	3.9%	10.8% (Note: Including 8.6% undecided.)	—N/a	—N/a	—N/a
27 Feb 2026	Sussan Ley resigns as an MP												
3 May 2025	2025 federal election			43.4%	—	20.0%	15.1%	6.6%	4.9%	10.0%	56.2%	43.8%	—

==== Mackellar ====
Date	Firm	Sample size	Margin of error	Primary vote						2CP vote	
Date	Firm	Sample size	Margin of error	Scamps (Ind)	Lib	ALP	Grn	ONP	Oth	Scamps (Ind)	Lib
17–19 Mar 2026	uComms	1,046	±3%	30.7%	22.2%	14.0%	4.6%	20.6%	7.9% (Note: Including 6.6% undecided.)	56.7%	43.3%
3 May 2025	2025 federal election			38.0%	35.5%	12.1%	6.1%	2.5%	5.8%	55.7%	44.3%

==== New England ====
Date	Firm	Sample size	Margin of error	Primary vote						2CP vote		
Date	Firm	Sample size	Margin of error	Nat	ALP	ONP	Grn	Ind	Oth	Nat	ALP	ONP
18–24 Dec 2025	New England Times	566	—N/a	17.5%	17.2%	11.2%	7%	12.2%	35% (Note: Including 34.7% undecided.)	—N/a	—N/a	—N/a
27 Nov – 8 Dec 2025	Barnaby Joyce resigns from the National Party and joins One Nation											
3 May 2025	2025 federal election			52.2%	20.3%	10.0%	7.9%	3.7%	5.9%	67.1%	32.9%	—

==== Wentworth ====
Date	Firm	Sample size	Margin of error	Primary vote						2CP vote	
Date	Firm	Sample size	Margin of error	Spender (Ind)	Lib	ALP	Grn	ONP	Oth	Spender (Ind)	Lib
17–19 Mar 2026	uComms	1,190	±2.84%	28.4%	24.4%	15.4%	7.2%	15.7%	9.1% (Note: Including 7.6% undecided.)	59.4%	40.6%
3 May 2025	2025 federal election			36.5%	36.3%	13.4%	10.2%	2.4%	1.2%	58.3%	41.7%

=== Victoria ===
==== Kooyong ====
Date	Firm	Sample size	Margin of error	Primary vote						2CP vote	
Date	Firm	Sample size	Margin of error	Lib	Ryan (Ind)	ALP	Grn	ONP	Oth	Ryan (Ind)	Lib
17–19 Mar 2026	uComms	1,184	±2.84%	32.2%	27.9%	12.3%	5.2%	12.5%	10% (Note: Including 7.7% undecided.)	50%	50%
3 May 2025	2025 federal election			43.1%	33.9%	11.9%	7.8%	1.0%	2.3%	50.7%	49.3%

=== Tasmania ===
==== Bass ====
Date	Firm	Sample size	Margin of error	Primary vote						2PP vote		
Date	Firm	Sample size	Margin of error	ALP	Lib	Grn	ONP	Ind	Oth	ALP	Lib	ONP
16–19 Feb 2026	EMRS	182	—	29%	23%	15%	25%	7%	2% (Note: 1% for the National Party and 1% for other parties.)	56%	44%	—
16–19 Feb 2026	EMRS	182	—	29%	23%	15%	25%	7%	2%	57%	—	43%
3 May 2025	2025 federal election			39.6%	31.4%	12.9%	6.5%	5.4%	4.2%	58.0%	42.0%	—

==== Braddon ====
Date	Firm	Sample size	Margin of error	Primary vote						2PP vote		
Date	Firm	Sample size	Margin of error	ALP	Lib	Grn	Ind	ONP	Oth	ALP	Lib	ONP
16–19 Feb 2026	EMRS	188	—	31%	16%	7%	10%	34%	2% (Note: 2% for the National Party and 0% for other parties.)	54%	46%	—
16–19 Feb 2026	EMRS	188	—	31%	16%	7%	10%	34%	2%	50%	—	50%
3 May 2025	2025 federal election			39.5%	31.7%	8.4%	8.3%	7.6%	4.5%	57.2%	42.8%	—

==== Clark ====
Date	Firm	Sample size	Margin of error	Primary vote						2CP vote			
Date	Firm	Sample size	Margin of error	Wilkie (Ind)	ALP	Lib	Grn	ONP	Oth	Wilkie (Ind)	ALP	Lib	ONP
16–19 Feb 2026	EMRS	223	—	—	27%	15%	17%	16%	25% (Note: 25% for "an independent", 0% for the National Party and 0% for other parties.)	—	67%	33%	—
16–19 Feb 2026	EMRS	223	—	—	27%	15%	17%	16%	25%	—	70%	—	30%
3 May 2025	2025 federal election			48.9%	20.0%	13.7%	13.2%	4.2%	—	70.4%	29.6%	—	—

==== Franklin ====
Date	Firm	Sample size	Margin of error	Primary vote					2CP vote			
Date	Firm	Sample size	Margin of error	ALP	Lib	Grn	ONP	Oth	ALP	George (Ind)	Lib	ONP
16–19 Feb 2026	EMRS	174	—	34%	21%	19%	17%	10% (Note: 9% for "an independent", 1% for the National Party and 0% for other parties.)	62%	—	38%	—
16–19 Feb 2026	EMRS	174	—	34%	21%	19%	17%	10%	70%	—	—	30%
3 May 2025	2025 federal election			39.0%	18.8%	10.5%	5.0%	26.7%	57.8%	42.2%	—	—

==== Lyons ====
Date	Firm	Sample size	Margin of error	Primary vote						2CP vote		
Date	Firm	Sample size	Margin of error	ALP	Lib	Grn	ONP	Ind	Oth	ALP	Lib	ONP
16–19 Feb 2026	EMRS	186	—	32%	16%	9%	29%	9%	5% (Note: 3% for the National Party and 2% for other parties.)	59%	41%	—
16–19 Feb 2026	EMRS	186	—	32%	16%	9%	29%	9%	5%	56%	—	44%
3 May 2025	2025 federal election			43.1%	26.2%	10.9%	6.7%	3.2%	5.2%	61.6%	38.4%	—

== Senate polling ==
=== Australian Capital Territory ===
Date	Firm	Sample size	Margin of error	Primary vote				
Date	Firm	Sample size	Margin of error	DP	ALP	Lib	Grn	Oth
26–28 Nov 2025	Liberal internal poll	—	—	34.7%	23.1%	21.5%	8.3%	12.5%
3 May 2025	2025 federal election			39.2%	31.7%	17.8%	7.8%	3.6%

== National direction polling ==
=== Individual polls ===
Date	Polling firm	Client	Right direction	Wrong direction	Unsure	Net
22–28 Jun 2026	Roy Morgan	—N/a	25.5%	57%	—N/a	−31.5%
15–21 Jun 2026	Roy Morgan	—N/a	24%	64%	—N/a	−39%
9–15 Mar 2026	Roy Morgan	—N/a	25.5%	60.5%	14%	−34.5%
2–8 Mar 2026	Roy Morgan	—N/a	26.5%	59%	14.5%	−32.5%
23 Feb–1 Mar 2026	Roy Morgan	—N/a	26.5%	58%	15.5%	−31.5%
18–23 Feb 2026	Essential	The Guardian	34%	49%	18%	−15%
13–16 Feb 2026	Roy Morgan	—N/a	33%	55%	12%	−22%
9–13 Feb 2026	Roy Morgan	—N/a	28.5%	57%	14.5%	−28.5%
2–8 Feb 2026	Roy Morgan	—N/a	28%	58%	14%	−30%
26 Jan – 1 Feb 2026	Roy Morgan	—N/a	30%	56.5%	13.5%	−26.5%
19–25 Jan 2026	Roy Morgan	—N/a	29.5%	56.5%	14%	−27%
20–23 Jan 2026	Essential	The Guardian	29%	54%	17%	−25%
12–18 Jan 2026	Roy Morgan	—N/a	30.5%	57.5%	12%	−27%
5–11 Jan 2026	Roy Morgan	—N/a	19.5%	45.5%	35%	−26%
19–24 Nov 2025	Essential	—N/a	35%	47%	18%	−12%
15–20 Oct 2025	Freshwater	The Daily Telegraph	35%	52%	13%	−17%
22–27 Oct 2025	Essential	—N/a	35%	46%	19%	−11%
24–29 Sep 2025	Essential	—N/a	34%	50%	16%	−16%
25 Aug – 21 Sep 2025	Roy Morgan	—N/a	32.5%	53%	14.5%	−20.5%
20–26 Aug 2025	Essential	—N/a	38%	47%	16%	−9%
24–29 July 2025	Essential	—N/a	38%	45%	17%	−7%
30 Jun – 27 Jul 2025	Roy Morgan	—N/a	37%	46.5%	16.5%	−9.5%
23–29 Jun 2025	Roy Morgan	—N/a	38.5%	46%	15.5%	−7.5%
2–22 Jun 2025	Roy Morgan	—N/a	43%	41.5%	15.5%	+1.5%
5 May – 1 Jun 2025	Roy Morgan	—N/a	41%	44%	15%	−3%
7–11 May 2025	Essential	—N/a	37%	42%	21%	−5%

== Hypothetical scenarios ==
=== Hypothetical leadership scenarios ===
==== With Barnaby Joyce as One Nation leader ====
Date	Polling firm	Client	Interview mode	Sample size	Primary vote								2PP vote		
Date	Polling firm	Client	Interview mode	Sample size	ALP	L/NP			Grn	ONP	Ind	Others	ALP	L/NP	ONP
Date	Polling firm	Client	Interview mode	Sample size	ALP	Lib	LNP	Nat	Grn	ONP	Ind	Others	ALP	L/NP	ONP
15–20 May 2026	DemosAU	Capital Brief	Online	1,502	28%	27%			14%	21%	10%		—N/a	—N/a	—N/a
3 May 2025	Election				34.6%	31.8%			12.2%	6.4%	7.4%	7.6%	55.2%	44.8%	—

=== Hypothetical new parties ===
==== Including "Teal Party" ====
Date	Polling firm	Client	Interview mode	Sample size	Primary vote									2PP vote		
Date	Polling firm	Client	Interview mode	Sample size	ALP	L/NP			Grn	ONP	Teal (CSA)	Ind	Others	ALP	L/NP	ONP
Date	Polling firm	Client	Interview mode	Sample size	ALP	Lib	LNP	Nat	Grn	ONP	Teal (CSA)	Ind	Others	ALP	L/NP	ONP
25–26 May 2026	Fox & Hedgehog	The Daily Telegraph	Online	1,700	26%	26%			9%	26%	6% (Note: Referred to as a 'Teal-style political party')	7%		—N/a	—N/a	—N/a
3 May 2025	Election				34.6%	31.8%			12.2%	6.4%	—	7.4%	7.6%	55.2%	44.8%	—

== See also ==
- Opinion polling for the 2025 Australian federal election
- Post-election pendulum for the 2025 Australian federal election
- Leadership approval opinion polling for the next Australian federal election
