= Leadership approval opinion polling for the next Australian federal election =

In the lead-up to the next Australian federal election, a number of polling companies have conducted opinion polls to gauge the opinions that voters hold towards political leaders.

== Preferred prime minister ==
=== 2026 ===
Date	Polling firm	Sample size	Party leaders				Lead
Date	Polling firm	Sample size	Albanese	Taylor	Hanson (Note: By convention, the Prime Minister must be a member of the House of Representatives (see Prime Minister of Australia § Selection and constitutional basis). Hanson currently holds office as a Senator.)	Unsure	Lead
6–10 Oct	Resolve	2,250	32%	22%	26%	20%	6
5–8 Oct	Newspoll	1,241	44%	39%	—N/a	17%	5
5–8 Oct	Newspoll	1,241	45%	25%	30%	—N/a	15
29 Sept–6 Oct	YouGov	1,500	40%	39%	—N/a	21%	1
29 Sept–6 Oct	YouGov	1,500	50%	—N/a	40%	10%	10
28 Sept–2 Oct	RedBridge/Accent	1,000	31%	15%	26%	28%	5
15–21 Sept	YouGov	1,500	41%	37%	—N/a	22%	4
15–21 Sept	YouGov	1,500	50%	—N/a	38%	12%	12
14–17 Sept	Newspoll	1,244	42%	41%	—N/a	17%	1
14–17 Sept	Newspoll	1,244	44%	24%	32%	—N/a	12
10–14 Sept	DemosAU	1,583	45%	—N/a	33%	22%	12
10–14 Sept	DemosAU	1,583	36%	21%	25%	18%	11
1–8 Sept	YouGov	1,500	43%	39%	—N/a	18%	4
1–8 Sept	YouGov	1,500	51%	—N/a	40%	9%	11
24–28 Aug	Newspoll	1,243	44%	35%	—N/a	21%	9
24–28 Aug	Newspoll	1,243	56%	—N/a	44%	—N/a	12
24–28 Aug	Newspoll	1,243	46%	23%	31%	—N/a	15
24–28 Aug	RedBridge/Accent	1,006	31%	15%	24%	30%	7
18–24 Aug	YouGov	1,510	44%	37%	—N/a	19%	7
18–24 Aug	YouGov	1,510	52%	—N/a	37%	11%	15
18–20 Aug	DemosAU	1,562	38%	36%	—N/a	26%	2
18–20 Aug	DemosAU	1,562	43%	—N/a	32%	25%	11
18–20 Aug	DemosAU	1,562	35%	23%	22%	20%	12
4–10 Aug	YouGov	1,500	42%	38%	—N/a	20%	4
4–10 Aug	YouGov	1,500	51%	—N/a	38%	11%	13
3–7 Aug	Newspoll	1,242	44%	37%	—N/a	19%	7
3–7 Aug	Newspoll	1,242	56%	—N/a	44%	—N/a	12
3–7 Aug	Newspoll	1,242	46%	23%	31%	—N/a	15
27–30 Jul	RedBridge/Accent	1,001	32%	15%	24%	29%	8
21–28 Jul	YouGov	1,500	43%	37%	—N/a	20%	6
21–28 Jul	YouGov	1,500	52%	—N/a	37%	11%	15
13–16 Jul	Newspoll	1,238	44%	36%	—N/a	20%	8
13–16 Jul	Newspoll	1,238	57%	—N/a	43%	—N/a	14
13–16 Jul	Newspoll	1,238	46%	22%	32%	—N/a	14
7–14 Jul	YouGov	1,500	45%	34%	—N/a	21%	11
7–14 Jul	YouGov	1,500	54%	—N/a	35%	11%	19
3–8 Jul	DemosAU	2,694	38%	38%	—N/a	24%	—N/a
3–8 Jul	DemosAU	2,694	42%	—N/a	37%	21%	5
3–8 Jul	DemosAU	2,694	35%	22%	26%	17%	9
23–30 Jun	YouGov	1,502	44%	35%	—N/a	21%	9
23–30 Jun	YouGov	1,502	49%	—N/a	40%	11%	9
22–26 Jun	RedBridge/Accent	1,006	33%	11%	23%	23%	10
22–25 Jun	Newspoll	1,235	47%	36%	—N/a	—N/a	11
22–25 Jun	Newspoll	1,235	49%	20% (Note: When supporters of Taylor asked to choose between Albanese and Hanson, 57% chose Albanese and 43% chose Hanson.)	31%	—N/a	18
16–18 Jun	DemosAU	1,497	35%	19%	28%	18	7
9–16 Jun	YouGov	1,492	43%	38%	—N/a	19%	5
9–16 Jun	YouGov	1,492	48%	—N/a	41%	11%	7
8–13 Jun	Resolve	1,801	29%	16%	33%	22%	4
1–4 Jun	Newspoll	1,240	44%	38%	—N/a	18%	6
26 May – 2 Jun	YouGov	1,471	41%	39%	—N/a	20%	2
26 May – 2 Jun	YouGov	1,471	47%	—N/a	41%	12%	6
25–28 May	RedBridge/Accent	1,005	31%	14%	25%	30%	6
25–26 May	Fox & Hedgehog	1,700	36%	38%	—N/a	26%	2
15–20 May	DemosAU	1,502	34%	23%	27%	16%	7
12–19 May	YouGov	1,504	41%	38%	—N/a	21%	3
12–19 May	YouGov	1,504	50%	—N/a	38%	12%	12
14–17 May	Newspoll	1,252	46%	38%	—N/a	16%	8
13–16 May	Resolve	1,800	30%	33%	—N/a	37%	3
28 Apr–5 May	YouGov	1,500	45%	36%	—N/a	19%	9
28 Apr–5 May	YouGov	1,500	54%	—N/a	35%	11%	19
24–30 Apr	RedBridge/Accent	1,014	33%	14%	23%	29%	10
14–21 Apr	YouGov	1,501	44%	39%	—N/a	17%	5
14–21 Apr	YouGov	1,501	50%	—N/a	39%	11%	11
13–18 Apr	Resolve	1,803	33%	32%	—N/a	35%	1
13–16 Apr	Newspoll	1,235	46%	37%	—N/a	17%	9
2–8 Apr	Spectre Strategy	1,002	41%	32%	—N/a	27%	9
2–8 Apr	Spectre Strategy	1,002	44%	—N/a	39%	17%	5
31 Mar–7 Apr	YouGov	1,502	44%	36%	—N/a	20%	8
27–29 Mar	Freshwater	1,050	42%	36%	—N/a	22%	6
23–27 Mar	RedBridge/Accent	1,003	33%	14%	23%	30%	10
23–26 Mar	Newspoll	1,232	44%	36%	—N/a	20%	8
24–25 Mar	Fox & Hedgehog	1,810	39%	35%	—N/a	26%	4
9–14 Mar	Resolve	1,803	35%	31%	—N/a	—N/a	4
23–27 Feb	Redbridge/Accent	1,006	34%	10%	23%	33%	11
23–26 Feb	Newspoll	1,237	45%	37%	—N/a	18%	8
16–20 Feb	DemosAU	1,551	37%	19%	25%	19%	12
17–19 Feb	Fox & Hedgehog	1,625	40%	35%	—N/a	25%	5
13 Feb	Angus Taylor replaces Sussan Ley as Liberal Party leader and Leader of the Opposition						
8–14 Feb	Resolve	1,800	38%	22%	—N/a	40%	16
3–10 Feb	YouGov	1,561	47%	25%	—N/a	27%	22
5–8 Feb	Newspoll	1,234	49%	30%	—N/a	21%	19
22–29 Jan	Redbridge	1,003	37%	9%	—N/a	54% (Note: Includes 8% "about the same", 34% "neither", and 12% "unsure".)	28
20–27 Jan	YouGov	1,500	47%	29%	—N/a	24%	18
13–21 Jan	DemosAU	1,933	39%	16%	26%	19%	13
12–16 Jan	Resolve	1,800	33%	29%	—N/a	38%	4
12–16 Jan	Newspoll	1,224	51%	31%	—N/a	18%	20
5–6 Jan	Fox & Hedgehog	1,608	39%	31%	—N/a	30%	8
5–6 Jan	DemosAU	1,027	42%	29%	—N/a	29%	13

=== 2025 ===
Date	Polling firm	Sample size	Party leaders			Lead
Date	Polling firm	Sample size	Albanese	Ley	Unsure	Lead
17–20 Dec	Resolve	1,010	38%	30%	32%	8
5–12 Dec	Redbridge	1,012	41%	12%	47% (Note: 25% responded "neither", 9% responded "about the same".)	29
2–7 Dec	Resolve	1,800	41%	26%	33%	15
17–20 Nov	Newspoll	1,245	54%	27%	19%	27
7–13 Nov	Redbridge	1,011	40%	10%	50% (Note: 28% responded "neither", 9% responded "about the same".)	30
4–8 Nov	Resolve	1,804	39%	25%	36%	14
27–30 Oct	Newspoll	1,265	54%	27%	19%	27
23–30 Oct	YouGov	4,578	51%	26%	23%	25
15–20 Oct	Freshwater	1,530	48%	31%	22%	17
7–12 Oct	Resolve	1,800	40%	23%	37%	17
29 Sep – 2 Oct	Newspoll	1,264	52%	30%	18%	22
25–30 Sep	YouGov	1,329	50%	28%	22%	22
9–13 Sep	Resolve	1,800	38%	26%	36%	12
8–11 Sep	Newspoll	1,283	51%	31%	18%	20
9–16 Aug	Resolve	1,800	41%	26%	33%	15
11–14 Aug	Newspoll	1,264	51%	31%	18%	20
18–30 Jul	Wolf & Smith	5,000	45%	35%	20%	10
13–18 Jul	Resolve	2,311	40%	25%	35%	15
14–17 Jul	Newspoll	1,264	52%	32%	16%	20
27 Jun – 1 Jul	Spectre Strategy	1,001	46%	27%	27%	19

== Leadership approval ==
=== 2026 ===
Date	Polling firm	Sample size	Albanese			Taylor			Shoebridge			Hanson		
Date	Polling firm	Sample size	Pos.	Neg.	Net	Pos.	Neg.	Net	Pos.	Neg.	Net	Pos.	Neg.	Net
23–26 Oct	DemosAU	1,500	26%	46%	−20	27%	26%	+1	16%	32%	-16	31%	45%	-14
6–10 Oct	Resolve	2,250	36%	54%	−18	41%	33%	+8	—			45%	41%	+4
5–8 Oct	Newspoll	1,241	36%	60%	−24	36%	47%	−11	—			43%	52%	−9
30 Sep	David Shoebridge is elected as Greens leader after Larissa Waters' resignation													
Date	Polling firm	Sample size	Albanese			Taylor			Waters			Hanson		
Date	Polling firm	Sample size	Pos.	Neg.	Net	Pos.	Neg.	Net	Pos.	Neg.	Net	Pos.	Neg.	Net
29 Sept–6 Oct	YouGov	1,500	33%	61%	−28	34%	51%	−17	—			—		
28 Sept–2 Oct	RedBridge/Accent	1,000	—N/a	—N/a	−27	—N/a	—N/a	−6	—			—N/a	—N/a	−10
23–28 Sept	Essential	1,022	37%	54%	−17	31%	43%	−12	—			—		
15–21 Sept	YouGov	1,500	33%	62%	−29	36%	48%	−12	—			—		
14–17 Sept	Newspoll	1,244	35%	62%	−27	35%	50%	−15	—			44%	51%	−7
1–8 Sept	YouGov	1,500	36%	59%	−23	36%	48%	−12	—			—		
26–31 Aug	Essential	1,050	35%	56%	−21	35%	38%	−3	—			—		
24–28 Aug	Newspoll	1,243	38%	59%	−21	33%	50%	−17	—			47%	48%	−1
18–24 Aug	YouGov	1,510	35%	59%	−24	33%	49%	−16	—			—		
4–10 Aug	YouGov	1,500	36%	57%	−21	35%	46%	−11	—			—		
3–7 Aug	Newspoll	1,242	37%	59%	−22	34%	46%	−12	—			46%	49%	−3
21–28 Jul	YouGov	1,500	38%	56%	−18	33%	49%	−16	—			—		
22–27 Jul	Essential	1,050	38%	52%	−14	33%	44%	−12	—			—		
13–16 Jul	Newspoll	1,238	39%	57%	−18	30%	51%	−21	—			47%	47%	0
7–14 Jul	YouGov	1,500	38%	56%	−18	33%	49%	−16	—			—		
23–30 Jun	YouGov	1,502	36%	57%	−21	36%	47%	−11	—			—		
24–29 Jun	Essential	1,017	38%	51%	−13	36%	37%	−1	—			—		
22–26 Jun	RedBridge	1,006	—N/a	—N/a	−18	—N/a	—N/a	−9	—			—N/a	—N/a	−10
22–25 Jun	Newspoll	1,235	40%	57%	−17	31%	51%	−20	—			46%	49%	−3
16–18 Jun	DemosAU	1,497	26%	49%	−23	22%	28%	−7	—			37%	40%	−3
9–16 Jun	YouGov	1,492	34%	60%	−26	41%	39%	+2	—			—		
8–13 Jun	Resolve	1,801	35%	55%	−20	38%	32%	+6	—			—		
1–4 Jun	Newspoll	1,240	36%	60%	−24	35%	45%	−10	—			—		
26 May – 2 Jun	YouGov	1,471	34%	60%	−26	41%	39%	+2	—			—		
25–28 May	RedBridge	1,005	—N/a	—N/a	−19	—N/a	—N/a	−4	—N/a	—N/a	−6	—N/a	—N/a	0
25–26 May	Fox & Hedgehog	1,700	29%	51%	−22	29%	29%	0	—			—		
20–25 May	Essential	1,027	37%	54%	−17	33%	37%	−4	—			—		
15–20 May	DemosAU	1,502	27%	47%	−20	28%	27%	+1	—			39%	36%	+3
12–19 May	YouGov	1,504	37%	56%	−19	36%	42%	−6	—			—		
14–17 May	Newspoll	1,252	40%	57%	−17	36%	48%	−12	—			—		
13–16 May	Resolve	1,800	34%	56%	−22	37%	29%	−8	—			—		
28 Apr–5 May	YouGov	1,500	40%	54%	−14	38%	42%	−4	—			—		
24–30 Apr	RedBridge	1,014	—N/a	—N/a	−9	—N/a	—N/a	−2	—N/a	—N/a	−4	—N/a	—N/a	−1
22–27 Apr	Essential	1,067	41%	51%	−10	34%	34%	0	—			—		
14–21 Apr	YouGov	1,501	38%	57%	−19	38%	43%	−5	—			—		
13–18 Apr	Resolve	1,803	37%	52%	−15	41%	26%	+15	—			—		
13–16 Apr	Newspoll	1,235	40%	57%	−17	33%	46%	−13	—			—		
2–8 Apr	Spectre Strategy	1,002	—N/a	—N/a	−22	—N/a	—N/a	+3	—			—N/a	—N/a	+4
31 Mar–7 Apr	YouGov	1,502	38%	39%	−1	44%	36%	+8	—			—		
27–29 Mar	Freshwater	1,050	34%	51%	−17	31%	17%	+14	—			47%	37%	+10
23–27 Mar	RedBridge	1,003	29%	46%	−15	19%	22%	−3	—			40%	43%	−3
23–26 Mar	Newspoll	1,232	39%	57%	−18	35%	42%	−7	—			—		
24–25 Mar	Fox & Hedgehog	1,810	30%	49%	−19	24%	24%	0	12%	18%	−6	41%	36%	+5
23–27 Feb	Redbridge	1,006	22%	45%	−13	19%	20%	−1	7%	10%	−3	38%	40%	−2
23–26 Feb	Newspoll	1,237	40%	55%	−15	35%	38%	−3	—			—		
18–23 Feb	Essential	1,002	42%	48%	−6	—			—			—		
16–20 Feb	DemosAU	1,551	29%	46%	−17	24%	28%	−4	—			37%	38%	−1
17–19 Feb	Fox & Hedgehog	1,625	32%	47%	−15	26%	23%	+3	10%	18%	−8	44%	35%	+9
8–14 Feb	Resolve	1,800	—N/a	—N/a	−12	—N/a	—N/a	+3	—			—N/a	—N/a	+7
13 Feb	Angus Taylor replaces Sussan Ley as Liberal Party leader and Leader of the Opposition													
Date	Polling firm	Sample size	Albanese			Ley			Waters			Hanson		
Date	Polling firm	Sample size	Pos.	Neg.	Net	Pos.	Neg.	Net	Pos.	Neg.	Net	Pos.	Neg.	Net
3–10 Feb	YouGov	1,561	38%	56%	−18	22%	62%	−40	—			—		
5–8 Feb	Newspoll	1,234	43%	53%	−10	23%	62%	−39	—			—		
22–29 Jan	Redbridge	1,003	34%	44%	−10	10%	42%	−32	—			38%	41%	−3
20–27 Jan	YouGov	1,500	39%	55%	−16	26%	57%	−31	—			—		
20–23 Jan	Essential	1,022	39%	53%	−14	30%	47%	−17	—			—		
13–21 Jan	DemosAU	1,933	27%	41%	−14	15%	33%	−18	—			35%	40%	−5
12–16 Jan	Resolve	1,800	35%	56%	−21	35%	42%	−7	—			—		
12–16 Jan	Newspoll	1,224	42%	53%	−11	28%	56%	−28	—			—		
5–6 Jan	Fox & Hedgehog	1,608	33%	48%	−15	19%	32%	−13	7%	16%	−9	38%	41%	−3
5–6 Jan	DemosAU	1,027	29%	41%	−12	17%	28%	−11	—			—		

=== 2025 ===
Date	Polling firm	Sample size												
Date	Polling firm	Sample size	Albanese			Ley			Waters			Hanson		
Date	Polling firm	Sample size	Pos.	Neg.	Net	Pos.	Neg.	Net	Pos.	Neg.	Net	Pos.	Neg.	Net
17–20 Dec	Resolve	1,010	40%	49%	−9	36%	40%	−4	—			—		
≤14 Dec	Resolve	1,606	—N/a	—N/a	+9	—N/a	—N/a	+8	—N/a	—N/a	+5	—N/a	—N/a	+3
5–12 Dec	Redbridge	1,012	39%	38%	+1	14%	34%	−20	—			—N/a	—N/a	−19
2–7 Dec	Resolve	1,800	48%	43%	+5	39%	37%	+2	—			—		
19–24 Nov	Essential	1,020	47%	43%	+4	31%	44%	−19	—			—		
17–20 Nov	Newspoll	1,245	47%	47%	0	26%	55%	−29	—			—		
7–13 Nov	Redbridge	1,011	37%	39%	−2	13%	34%	−21	6%	13%	−7	32%	45%	−13
4–8 Nov	Resolve	1,804	44%	44%	0	33%	41%	−8	—			—N/a	—N/a	+8
27–30 Oct	Newspoll	1,265	46%	51%	−5	25%	58%	−33	—			—		
23–30 Oct	YouGov	4,578	—N/a	—N/a	−3	—N/a	—N/a	−22	—			—		
22–27 Oct	Essential	1,041	45%	44%	+1	32%	43%	−9	—			—		
15–20 Oct	Freshwater	1,530	—N/a	—N/a	−7	—N/a	—N/a	−5	—			—		
7–12 Oct	Resolve	1,800	41%	47%	−6	33%	38%	−5	—			—		
29 Sep – 2 Oct	Newspoll	1,264	47%	48%	−1	31%	52%	−21	—			—		
25–30 Sep	YouGov	1,329	—N/a	—N/a	−4	—N/a	—N/a	−19	—			—		
24–29 Sep	Essential	1,001	44%	46%	−2	32%	41%	−9	—			—		
9–13 Sep	Resolve	1,800	44%	45%	−1	41%	32%	+9	—			—		
8–11 Sep	Newspoll	1,283	45%	50%	−5	32%	49%	−17	—			—		
20–26 Aug	Essential	1,034	49%	43%	+6	35%	37%	−2	—			—		
9–16 Aug	Resolve	1,800	43%	45%	−2	38%	29%	+9	—			—		
11–14 Aug	Newspoll	1,264	49%	46%	+3	35%	44%	−9	—			—		
24–29 Jul	Essential	1,012	50%	41%	+9	33%	35%	−2	—			—		
13–18 Jul	Resolve	2,311	45%	42%	+3	38%	29%	+9	—			—		
14–17 Jul	Newspoll	1,264	47%	47%	0	35%	42%	−7	—			—		
4–10 Jul	Morning Consult	3,770	54%	35%	+19	—			—			—		
3–9 Jun	Morning Consult	3,770	53%	36%	+17	—			—			—		
7–11 May	Essential	1,137	50%	39%	+11	—			—			—		
2–8 May	Morning Consult	3,770	57%	33%	+24	—			—			—		

== Party approval ==
Date	Polling firm	Sample size	Labor			Liberal			National			Greens			One Nation		
Date	Polling firm	Sample size	Pos.	Neg.	Net	Pos.	Neg.	Net	Pos.	Neg.	Net	Pos.	Neg.	Net	Pos.	Neg.	Net
25–26 May 2026	Fox & Hedgehog	1,700	30%	45%	−15	31%	38%	−7	—			26%	43%	−17	43%	35%	+8
27–29 Mar 2026	Freshwater	1,050	37%	42%	−5	36%	35%	+1	28%	29%	−1	29%	39%	−10	48%	33%	+15
2–8 Apr 2026	Spectre Strategy	1,002	32%	46%	−14	31%	42%	−11	—			29%	45%	−16	45%	36%	+9
24–25 Mar 2026	Fox & Hedgehog	1,810	32%	42%	−10	30%	35%	−5	—			—			43%	32%	+11
23–27 Feb 2026	Redbridge	1,006	37%	41%	−4	28%	43%	−15	19%	37%	−18	26%	46%	−20	37%	40%	−3
17–19 Feb 2026	Fox & Hedgehog	1,625	33%	41%	−8	29%	36%	−9	—			44%	32%	+12	—		
22–29 Jan 2026	Redbridge	5,001	37%	40%	−3	24%	46%	−22	21%	38%	−17	23%	49%	−26	37%	43%	−6
5–6 Jan 2026	Fox & Hedgehog	1,608	32%	42%	−10	28%	38%	−10	—			36%	37%	−1	—		
5–12 Dec 2025	Redbridge	1,012	42%	35%	+7	31%	44%	−13	—			27%	46%	−19	31%	50%	−19
7–26 Nov 2025	Redbridge	4,775	41%	38%	+3	29%	44%	−15	—			23%	50%	−27	30%	48%	−18
15–20 Oct 2025	Freshwater	1,530	39%	38%	+1	34%	39%	−5	27%	28%	−1	28%	44%	−15	—		

== Party leadership ==
=== Liberal ===
Date	Polling Firm	Sample size	Preferred Liberal leader										
Date	Polling Firm	Sample size	Ley	Hastie	McIntosh	T. O'Brien	Price	Spender (Note: Not a member of the party)	Taylor	Tehan	Wilson	Other	Don't know
8–14 Feb 2026	Resolve	1,717 (all)	19%	13%	—N/a	3%	—N/a	—N/a	10%	—N/a	4%	—N/a	52%
8–14 Feb 2026	Resolve	— (ONP)	10%	26%	—N/a	—N/a	—N/a	—N/a	15%	—N/a	—N/a	—N/a	—N/a
13 Feb 2026	Liberal party room vote		33.3%	—	—	—	—	—	66.7%	—	—	—	—
3–10 Feb 2026	YouGov	1,561 (all)	10%	15%	2%	2%	—N/a	—N/a	8%	—N/a	3%	—N/a	60%
3–10 Feb 2026	YouGov	300 (L/NP)	12%	25%	2%	3%	—N/a	—N/a	11%	—N/a	2%	—N/a	45%
19–24 Nov 2025	Essential	1,020 (all)	14%	8%	—N/a	—N/a	11%	2%	5%	—N/a	5%	10%	45%
19–24 Nov 2025	Essential	244 (L/NP)	21%	17%	—N/a	—N/a	12%	7%	9%	—N/a	3%	5%	26%
17–20 Nov 2025	Newspoll	1,245 (all)	21%	15%	—N/a	3%	—N/a	—N/a	9%	—N/a	6%	—N/a	46%
17–20 Nov 2025	Newspoll	300 (L/NP)	28%	20%	—N/a	2%	—N/a	—N/a	12%	—N/a	7%	—N/a	31%
22–27 Oct 2025	Essential	1,041 (all)	13%	10%	—N/a	—N/a	10%	4%	7%	—N/a	3%	16%	42%
22–27 Oct 2025	Essential	236 (L/NP)	22%	20%	—N/a	—N/a	13%	4%	9%	—N/a	4%	5%	24%
13 May 2025	Liberal party room vote		53.7%	—	—	—	—	—	46.3%	—	—	—	—
7–11 May 2025	Essential	1,137 (all)	16%	—N/a	—N/a	—N/a	—N/a	—N/a	12%	7%	—N/a	20%	45%
7–11 May 2025	Essential	341 (L/NP)	20%	—N/a	—N/a	—N/a	—N/a	—N/a	23%	6%	—N/a	12%	39%

== Individual politician approval ==
=== Labor ===
Date	Polling Firm	Sample size	Labor politician net favourability							
Date	Polling Firm	Sample size	Bowen	Butler	Burke	Chalmers	King	Rowland	Wells	Wong
22–26 Jun 2026	RedBridge	1,006	—N/a	—N/a	—N/a	−18%	—N/a	—N/a	—N/a	—N/a
25–28 May 2026	RedBridge	1,005	—N/a	—N/a	—N/a	−18%	—N/a	—N/a	—N/a	—N/a
25–26 May	Fox & Hedgehog	1,700	—N/a	—N/a	—N/a	−17%	—N/a	—N/a	—N/a	—N/a
24–30 Apr	RedBridge	1,014	−16%	—N/a	—N/a	—N/a	—N/a	—N/a	—N/a	—N/a
2–8 Apr 2026	Spectre Strategy	1,002	−17%	—N/a	—N/a	−12%	—N/a	—N/a	—N/a	—N/a
27–29 Mar 2026	Freshwater	1,050	−13%	—N/a	—N/a	−8%	—N/a	—N/a	—N/a	−4%
24–25 Feb 2026	Fox & Hedgehog	1,810	−15%	—N/a	—N/a	−12%	—N/a	—N/a	—N/a	—N/a
8–14 Feb 2026	Resolve	1,717	−8%	—N/a	—N/a	—N/a	—N/a	—N/a	—N/a	—N/a
≤14 Dec 2025	Resolve	1,606	0%	+6%	+7%	+5%	+7%	+9%	+6%	+11%
5–12 Dec 2025	Redbridge	1,012	−14%	—N/a	−11%	−5%	—N/a	—N/a	—N/a	—N/a
15–20 Oct 2025	Freshwater	1,530	−7%	—N/a	—N/a	−2%	—N/a	—N/a	—N/a	−4%
9–16 Aug 2025	Resolve	1,800	—N/a	+4%	—N/a	+1%	+4%	+4%	+4%	+5%

=== Opposition/crossbench ===
Date	Polling Firm	Sample size	Opposition and crossbench politician net favourability									
Date	Polling Firm	Sample size	Hastie	Hume	Ley (Note: Ley's approval rating is listed under § Leadership approval prior to her removal as opposition leader on 13 February 2026.)	T. O'Brien	Price	Taylor (Note: Taylor's approval rating is listed under § Leadership approval following his election as opposition leader on 13 February 2026.)	Wilson	Canavan	Littleproud	Joyce (Note: Barnaby Joyce resigned from the National Party of Australia to sit as an independent on 27 November 2025, and joined One Nation on 8 December 2025.)
22–26 Jun 2026	RedBridge	1,006	—N/a	—N/a	—N/a	—N/a	—N/a	—N/a	—N/a	—N/a	—N/a	−24%
25–28 May 2026	RedBridge	1,005	−6%	—N/a	—N/a	—N/a	—N/a	—N/a	—N/a	−4%	—N/a	—N/a
25–26 May 2026	Fox & Hedgehog	1,700	—N/a	−4%	—N/a	—N/a	—N/a	—N/a	—N/a	—N/a	—N/a	−12%
24–30 Apr 2026	RedBridge	1,014	—N/a	—N/a	—N/a	—N/a	—N/a	—N/a	—N/a	−2%	—N/a	—N/a
2–8 Apr 2026	Spectre Strategy	1,002	—N/a	—N/a	—N/a	—N/a	—N/a	—N/a	—N/a	−2%	—N/a	—N/a
27–29 Mar 2026	Freshwater	1,050	+9%	—N/a	−14%	+3%	−3%	—N/a	+4%	+8%	−2%	0%
23–27 Mar 2026	Redbridge	1,003	—N/a	—N/a	—N/a	—N/a	—N/a	—N/a	—N/a	−3%	—N/a	—N/a
24–25 Mar 2026	Fox & Hedgehog	1,810	—N/a	−2%	—N/a	—N/a	—N/a	—N/a	—N/a	—N/a	—N/a	−8%
23–27 Feb 2026	Redbridge	1,006	—N/a	−3%	—N/a	—N/a	—N/a	—N/a	−3%	—N/a	−13%	−17%
17–19 Feb 2026	Fox & Hedgehog	1,625	+1%	0%	−22%	—N/a	−5%	—N/a	—N/a	—N/a	—N/a	−8%
8–14 Feb 2026	Resolve	1,717	+4%	—N/a	—N/a	—N/a	—N/a	—N/a	—N/a	—N/a	−8%	—N/a
22–29 Jan 2026	Redbridge	1,003	0%	—N/a	—N/a	—N/a	—N/a	−4%	—N/a	—N/a	−14%	−19%
5–6 Jan 2026	Fox & Hedgehog	1,608	0%	—N/a	—N/a	—N/a	−6%	−4%	—N/a	—N/a	—N/a	−18%
≤14 Dec 2025	Resolve	1,606	+6%	+6%	—N/a	+8%	+3%	+8%	+11%	—N/a	+8%	−4%
5–12 Dec 2025	Redbridge	1,012	—N/a	—N/a	—N/a	—N/a	—N/a	—N/a	—N/a	—N/a	—N/a	−27%
7–13 Nov 2025	Redbridge	1,011	+1%	—N/a	—N/a	—N/a	—N/a	−6%	—N/a	—N/a	—N/a	−23%
4–8 Nov 2025	Resolve	1,804	+8%	—N/a	—N/a	—N/a	—N/a	—N/a	—N/a	—N/a	—N/a	−8%
15–20 Oct 2025	Freshwater	1,530	+7%	—N/a	—N/a	—N/a	−3%	0%	—N/a	—N/a	−1%	−11%
7–12 Oct 2025	Resolve	1,800	+6%	—N/a	—N/a	—N/a	—N/a	—N/a	—N/a	—N/a	—N/a	—N/a
9–13 Sep 2025	Resolve	1,800	+4%	—N/a	—N/a	—N/a	—N/a	—N/a	—N/a	—N/a	—N/a	—N/a
9–16 Aug 2025	Resolve	1,800	—N/a	—N/a	—N/a	+6%	—N/a	—N/a	—N/a	—N/a	—N/a	—N/a

== See also ==
- Opinion polling for the 2025 Australian federal election
- Electorate opinion polling and projections for the next Australian federal election
