= APC =

APC most often refers to:

- Armoured personnel carrier, an armoured fighting vehicle

APC or Apc may also refer to:

== Computing and technology ==
- Auto Power Control, a system of powering e.g., laser diodes
- Adaptive predictive coding, an analog-to-digital conversion system
- Advanced process control, a concept in control theory
- Alternative PHP Cache, a PHP accelerator program
- Angled physical contact, a technique used in optical fiber connections
- APC (magazine), Australian Personal Computer magazine
- APC III or Advanced Personal Computer, a 1983 NEC microcomputer
- APC by Schneider Electric, formerly American Power Conversion Corporation or simply APC, a manufacturer of uninterruptible power supplies, electronics peripherals and data center products
- APC-7 connector, a coaxial connector used for high-frequency applications
- Application Program Command, a C1 control code
- Asynchronous procedure call, a function that executes asynchronously in the context of a specific thread on Microsoft Windows
- Atari Punk Console, a simple DIY noisemaker circuit
- Automated passenger counter, a people counter that counts people as they enter/exit public transport vehicles
- VIA APC, a low-cost Android PC computer

== Science ==
=== General ===
- Article processing charge, a fee charged to authors for publication in an open access journal

=== Biology and medicine ===
- Activated protein C, an anti-coagulant and anti-inflammatory protein
- Adenomatous polyposis coli, a tumor suppressor protein encoded by the APC gene, mutations in which can cause colon cancer
- Anaphase-promoting complex, a ubiquitin ligase cell cycle protein
- Antigen-presenting cell, a type of cell that displays foreign antigens
- Amino Acid-Polyamine-Organocation (APC) Family of transport proteins
- APC Superfamily, a superfamily of transport proteins
- APC tablet, analgesic compound of aspirin, phenacetin, and caffeine
  - Vincent's APC, a discontinued analgesic trademark, once popular in Australia
- Argon plasma coagulation, an endoscopic technique for controlling hemorrhage
- Atrial premature complexes, a type of premature heart beat or irregular heart beat or arrhythmia which start in the upper two chambers of the heart
- Australian Plant Census, a plant database website

=== Chemistry ===
- Allophycocyanin, a protein from the light-harvesting phycobiliprotein family
- Allylpalladium chloride dimer, a chemical compound
- Ammonium perchlorate, a powerful oxidizer used in solid rocket motors

== Military ==
- Armoured personnel carrier, type of armoured military vehicle
- Armour-piercing capped, an anti-armor shell type
- Army Proficiency Certificate, the training syllabus of the Army Cadet Force
- Brügger & Thomet APC (Advanced Police Carbine), a family of submachine guns and rifles produced by B&T AG
- Two US Navy hull classification symbols: Coastal transport (APC) and Small coastal transport (APc)

== Organizations ==
- Astroparticle and Cosmology Laboratory, a research laboratory located in Paris
- A.P.C., A French design group and clothing retailer
- African, Caribbean and Pacific Group of States, a group of countries
- African People's Convention, a South African political party
- Alianza Popular Conservadora, a political party in Nicaragua
- Alien Property Custodian, a former office within the Government of the United States
- All People's Congress, a political party in Sierra Leone
- All Progressives Congress, a political party in Nigeria
- All Pueblo Council and its successor the All Pueblo Council of Governors, intergovernmental organizations of Pueblos in the United States
- Alternativa Popular Canaria, a separatist political party of the Canary Islands
- American Pie Council, an organization committed to preserving America's pie heritage
- American Plastics Council, a major trade association for the U.S. plastics industry
- Anadarko Petroleum Corporation, a defunct American petroleum exploration company
- Animal Procedures Committee, a UK public body and task force
- Anti-Poverty Committee, a direct action organization in Vancouver, Canada
- Apocalypse Production Crew, an MP3 warez organization
- Arab Potash Company, a potash production company headquartered in Jordan
- Armed Proletarians for Communism, an Italian far-left terrorist group of the 1970s
- Arrangers' Publishing Company, a sheet music publishing company in the United States
- Asia Pacific College, a joint venture between IBM Philippines and the SM Foundation
- Ashurst Perkins Coie, law firm
- Associated Presbyterian Churches, a Scottish Christian denomination
- Association for Progressive Communications, a worldwide network of organisations helping others use the internet to promote social justice and sustainable development
- Association of Professional Chaplains, internationally certified hospice chaplains
- Australian Polling Council, a polling industry body
- Patriotic Alliance for Change, a Paraguayan political alliance (Alianza Patriótica por el Cambio)

== Places ==
- Apc, Hungary, a village in the Heves County of Hungary
- Napa County Airport (IATA airport code APC), near Napa, California

== Sports ==
- African Paralympic Committee, a sports organization based in Cairo, Egypt
- Americas Paralympic Committee, an umbrella organization of National Paralympic Committees
- Asian Paralympic Committee, an umbrella organisation of National Paralympic Committees
- Australian Paralympic Committee
- Australian Pickleball Championships
- Australian Provincial Championship, a rugby union competition in Australia

== Other uses ==
- Alan Peter Cayetano, a Filipino politician who was the former Senate President from May to June 2026
- A Perfect Circle, an American rock supergroup
- Alkali Pozzolan Cement, an alternative cement developed at Curtin University, Australia
- Ambulatory Payment Classification
- Asia Pacific Catering, restaurant chain
- Attoparsec, an unusual minuscule unit of astronomic distance
- Automatic Performance Control, a system that was used on some Saab H engines
- Average propensity to consume, the proportion of income spent
- Levantine Arabic, by ISO 639-3 code
  - North Levantine Arabic, by a previously separate ISO 639-3 code, which has now been broadened to include Levantine Arabic

== See also ==
- APCR (disambiguation)
- APCS (disambiguation)
