= AP-100 =

AP100 may refer to:

- Republic AP-100, a VTOL airplane project
- USS Windsor (AP-100), a WWII U.S. Navy Windsor-class attack transport
- Harrison Audio AP-100 radio broadcast console
- Ace Tone AP-100 electronic piano
- Gold Apollo AP-100 numieric pager

== See also ==
- APC (disambiguation)
- APH (disambiguation)
- AP (disambiguation)
- 100 (disambiguation)
- AP1000 nuclear reactor
