= APCS =

APCS may refer to:

- Serum amyloid P component, a human gene
- AP Computer Science
- Academics Plus Charter Schools, in Arkansas
- Avoyelles Public Charter School, Mansura, Louisiana

== See also ==
- APC (disambiguation)
