= Henry Thornton (magazine) =

Australian online news and culture magazine

Henry Thornton is an Australian online news and culture magazine, created in 1999. It is named for Henry Thornton of the Clapham Sect, a banker, philanthropist and parliamentarian of late 18th and early 19th century Great Britain.

Henry Thornton brings together views from contributors including economist and founder Peter Jonson, chief executive of Roy Morgan Research, Michele Levine, the late political commentator PP McGuinness, executive director of the Institute of Public Affairs, John Roskam, Chief Economist of the ANZ, Saul Eslake, Former CEO of Western Mining Corporation (WMC) and former member of the board of directors of the Reserve Bank of Australia, Hugh Morgan, policy adviser, diplomat and professor, Ross Garnaut and owner and executive director of Roy Morgan Research, Gary Morgan.

Henry Thornton logo

== History ==
Henry Thornton was founded in 1999 by professional director and economist Peter Jonson. Jonson has in the past been chairman of ANZ Funds Management, group managing director of Norwich Union Australia and Financial Services and Head of Research at James Capel Australia. Between 1972 and 1988, He held senior positions at the Reserve Bank of Australia as an economist under John Phillips (1972–1975), Harold Knight (1975–1982) and Bob Johnston (1982–1988). He was chairman of the Melbourne Institute Advisory Board between 1992 and 2002, and now serves as chair emeritus whilst running the day-to-day operations of Henry Thornton.

== Links to politics ==
In 2008, Jonson sought Liberal preselection for the federal seat of Kooyong.

== See also ==
- Journalism in Australia
