= Australian Polling Council =

Australian association of polling firms

- Abbreviation: APC
- Established: October 28, 2020; 5 years ago
- Type: Industry body
- Purpose: Promoting and maintaining opinion polling standards
- Chair: Chris Lonergan
- Website: australianpollingcouncil.com

The Australian Polling Council is an association of polling firms established to promote and maintain professional standards in opinion polling. Firms that join must disclose their public polls' full question wordings and preambles, sample sizes, and how responses were collected and weighted.

Following the 2019 federal election, the Australian polling industry suffered major damage to its reputation because of polls' failure to predict the Coalition's victory. In an attempt to revive the industry's reputation, YouGov, Essential and uComms, three major polling firms, announced in April 2020 they intended to form an industry body modelled on the British Polling Council and the National Council for Published Polls in the US. By October 2020, when the APC was formally established, Ipsos, Lonergan Research, JWS Research, and Telereach joined as founding members. Other firms to have since joined include 89 Degrees East, The Australia Institute, Pyxis Polling & Insights, DemosAU and SEC Newgate.

Not every major Australian polling firm is an APC member. Resolve Strategic, which polls for the major newspapers The Age and The Sydney Morning Herald, is a prominent absence from the council's membership. Jim Reed, its founder, has cited the need to protect trade secrets and his belief some APC members are "beyond the pale" as reasons for Resolve's decision not to join the association. Roy Morgan is another polling firm whose absence has been explicitly noted.
