= APH =

APH, Aph, or APh may refer to:

- A. P. Herbert, a British writer
- A.P. Hill Army Airfield, IATA airport code
- American Printing House for the Blind
- Arthur Paul Harper (1865–1955), New Zealand lawyer, mountaineer, explorer, businessman known as APH
- Association of Personal Historians
- Antepartum haemorrhage
- L'Année philologique
- APh Technological Consulting
- Air preheater
- Hetalia: Axis Powers, a manga and anime series originally published as Axis Powers Hetelia
- Australian Parliament House, the meeting place of the Parliament of Australia
- A US Navy hull classification symbol: Evacuation transport (APH)
- Amphenol (NYSE stock symbol APH)
