= Next Australian federal election =

Election of Australia's 49th parliament

- On or before 20 May 2028 (House and half-Senate); On or before 23 September 2028 (House)

All 150 seats in the House of Representatives 76 seats needed for a majority 40 of 76 seats in the Senate
- Opinion polls
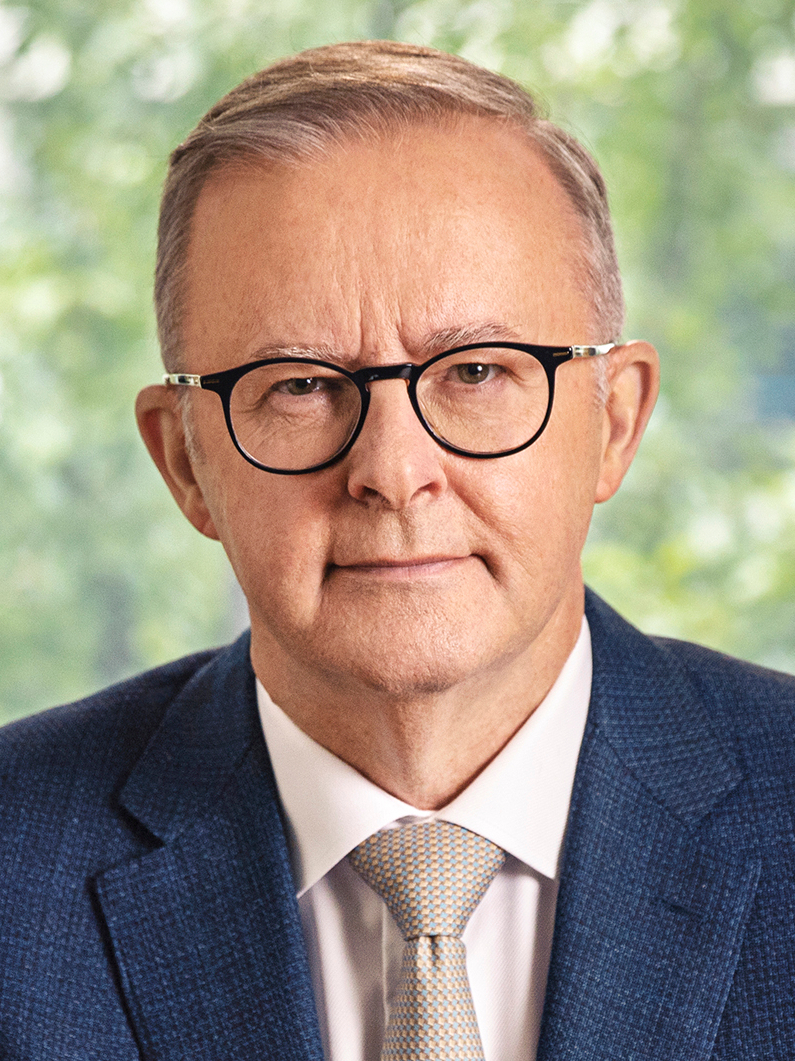

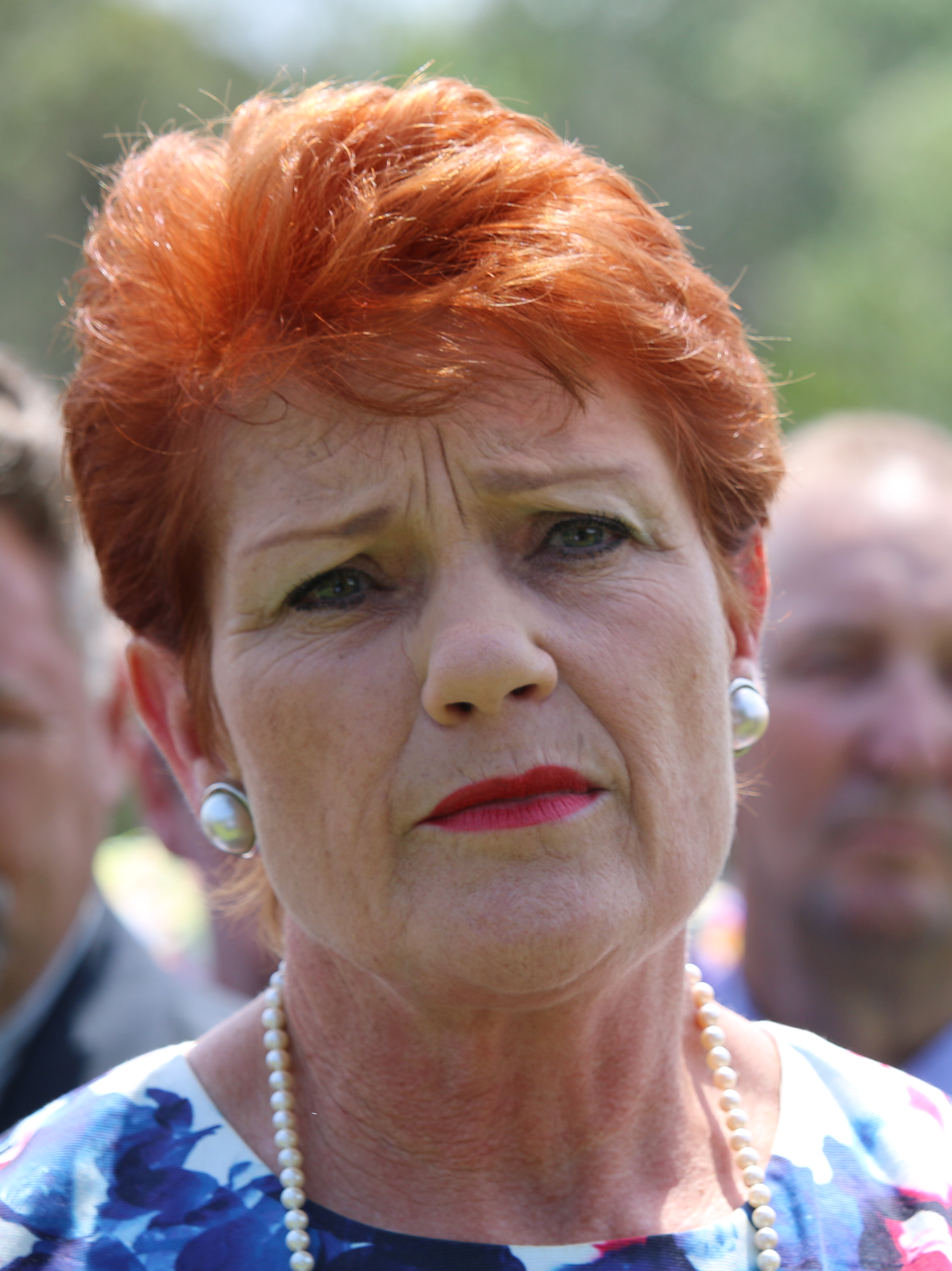

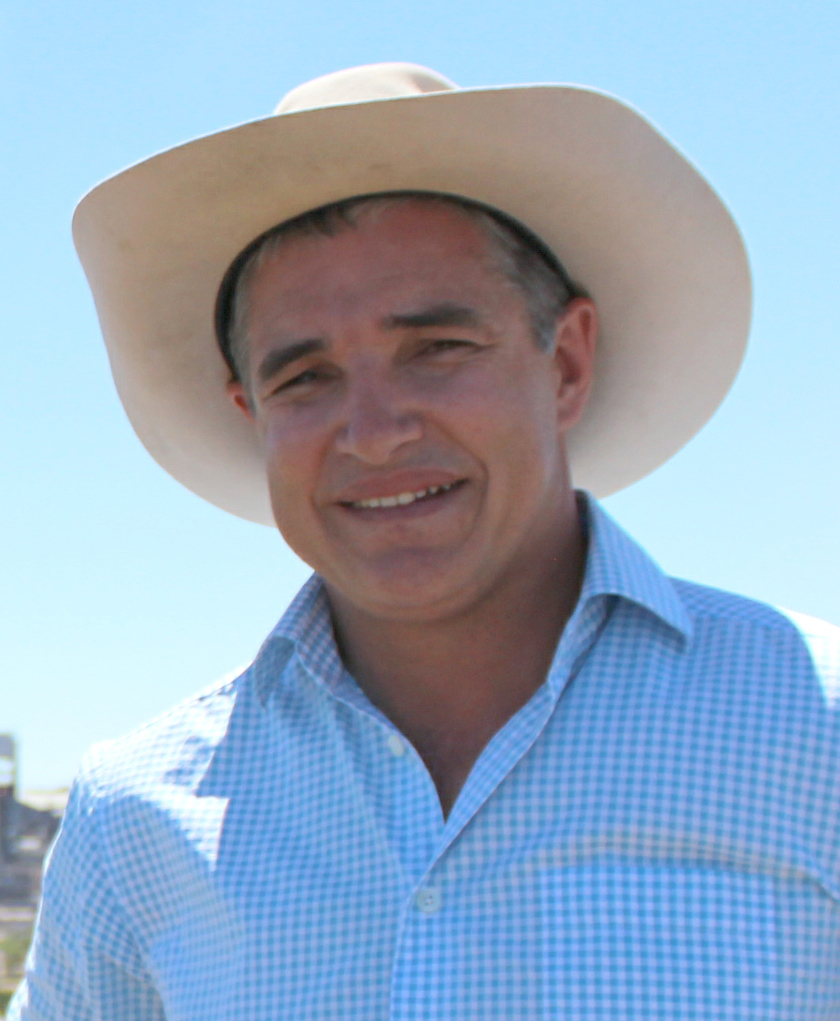

Leader	Anthony Albanese	Angus Taylor	Pauline Hanson
Party	Labor	Coalition	One Nation
Leader since	30 May 2019	13 February 2026	18 November 2014
Leader's seat	Grayndler (NSW)	Hume (NSW)	Queensland (Senate)
Last election	94 seats	43 seats	0 seats
Current seats	94	41 (Note: National Party MP for New England Barnaby Joyce resigned from the party on 27 November 2025, later joining One Nation.; The division of Farrer was lost to One Nation at the by-election in May 2026 following the resignation of former Opposition Leader Sussan Ley on 27 February 2026.)	2
Seats needed	Steady	▲35	▲74
Leader	David Shoebridge	Collective leadership	Robbie Katter
Party	Greens	Community Strong	Katter's Australian
Leader since	30 September 2026	N/A	3 February 2020
Leader's seat	New South Wales (Senate)	N/A	None (Note: Party leader Robbie Katter sits as the member for Traeger in the Queensland Legislative Assembly.)
Last election	1 seat	Did not exist	1 seat
Current seats	1	2	1
Seats needed	▲75	▲74	N/A (Note: KAP conventionally do not field candidates outside of Queensland, precluding it from forming majority government.)
		IND
Leader	No leader	N/A
Party	Centre Alliance	Independents
Leader since	N/A	N/A
Leader's seat	N/A	N/A
Last election	1 seat	10 seats
Current seats	1	8 (Note: "Teal" Independent MPs Zali Steggall and Allegra Spender formed and joined Community Strong Australia on 20 June 2026.)
Seats needed	N/A (Note: Centre Alliance MP Rebekha Sharkie, who has described CA as a "party of one," has been a de facto independent since 2022. Sharkie cites complexities around residual savings in the party account as the main reason for her not to run officially as an independent.)	N/A (Note: Independents are non-partied Members of Parliament. Although they may individually choose to support the formation of a government, they do not act as a group.)
Incumbent Prime Minister
Anthony Albanese
Labor

A federal election is scheduled to be held by 2028 (Note: On or before 20 May 2028 (for the House and half the Senate), or on or before 23 September 2028 (for just the House), or on or before 18 March 2028 (for a double dissolution election).) to elect members of the House of Representatives and half of the Senate to the 49th Parliament of Australia.

The incumbent Labor government, led by Prime Minister Anthony Albanese, will seek a third consecutive term in government, challenged by the Liberal–National Coalition led by Opposition Leader Angus Taylor. The Greens, One Nation, and other minor parties and independents will also contest the election.

Australia has compulsory voting, with preferential instant-runoff voting in single-member seats.

== Background ==
=== Previous election ===
The 2025 Australian federal election, held on 3 May, resulted in a historic landslide victory for the Australian Labor Party (ALP) under Prime Minister Anthony Albanese. Labor secured 94 seats in the House of Representatives, growing their parliamentary majority and achieving the largest number of seats won by the party at the federal level in its history. The result exceeded almost all published opinion polling, which had predicted either a smaller majority for the Labor government or a hung parliament. It was the fourth time in history that a party or coalition secured 90 or more seats in a federal election — the last instance being in 2013. It also marked the first time a single party, and specifically the Labor Party, achieved this feat and this was also the equal largest number of seats won by a party or coalition in Australian electoral history exceeding the 1975 election result and equalling the 1996 result.

The Coalition suffered significant losses, including the seat of Dickson, held by then-Opposition Leader Peter Dutton, who was unseated by Labor's Ali France.

A particularly notable outcome was the dramatic decline of the Australian Greens in the lower house. The party lost three of its four seats, including the long-held seat of Melbourne, where Greens leader Adam Bandt was defeated by Labor's Sarah Witty, ending his 15-year tenure in Parliament. The Greens' only remaining seat in the House of Representatives was Ryan in Queensland, held by Elizabeth Watson-Brown. Some prominent commentary attributed the Greens' losses to their policy positions, particularly regarding the Israel-Gaza conflict, and a perceived shift away from core environmental issues, leading to voter alienation in key electorates. Other commentary instead explained the dramatic fall in seat count as primarily due to the way small shifts in vote counts can lead to large shifts in margins and seat counts under Australia's preferential voting system, also a factor in the Greens' sudden jump from 1 to 4 seats in 2022.

Another significant development in the 2025 election was the re-emergence of Clive Palmer with a new political party, the Trumpet of Patriots. After the High Court blocked the re-registration of his previous party, the United Australia Party, Palmer joined the Trumpet of Patriots in February 2025, which was modelled after Trumpism. The party's campaign featured slogans like "Make Australia Great Again" and policies opposing immigration and gender diversity initiatives. Despite spending approximately $60 million on a nationwide advertising blitz, including over $6 million on YouTube and Meta platforms, and sending over 17 million unsolicited text messages, the party failed to secure any seats in Parliament, garnering only 1.85% of the national vote. Following this defeat, Palmer announced his retirement from politics.

Nationals senator Matt Canavan challenged incumbent leader David Littleproud in a leadership spill. Littleproud was re-elected as party leader on 12 May.

On 13 May 2025, the Liberals elected their new leader in a leadership election. Following the federal election but prior to the leadership election, Senator Jacinta Nampijinpa Price defected from the Nationals party room to the Liberal party room to stand in the election for the position of Deputy Leader. Sussan Ley was subsequently elected leader, narrowly defeating Angus Taylor, with Ted O'Brien being elected as her deputy. Ley is the first woman elected to lead the Liberals, the Coalition, or serve as the Leader of the Opposition at the federal level in Australia. At 63, Ley is also the oldest first-time Leader of the Opposition since Arthur Calwell in 1960.

The Greens held a leadership election on 15 May 2025 and elected Queensland senator Larissa Waters as their leader.

On 20 May 2025, Littleproud announced the breakup of the Coalition, citing irreconcilable policy disagreements around nuclear energy amongst other topics.

On 28 May 2025, Sussan Ley and David Littleproud announced that a new deal had been reached to reunify the Liberal–National Coalition after the Liberal Party agreed on an 'in principle' basis to support the four policy demands from the Nationals Party – removing the moratorium on nuclear energy, supermarket divestiture powers, regional phone coverage, and a regional future fund. The Coalition's shadow cabinet, consisting of 14 Liberals and 6 Nationals, was announced later that afternoon.

On 2 June 2025, Western Australian senator Dorinda Cox announced that she had defected from the Greens to the ALP. This brought Labor up to 29 senators, allowing them to pass legislation with either the Coalition or the Greens. Alternatively, Labor can pass legislation through the Senate with the support of all ten of the other crossbench senators; the four One Nation senators, Ralph Babet, Jacqui Lambie, Fatima Payman, David Pocock, and Lidia Thorpe, but this is considered unlikely due to their highly divergent political views.

=== Composition of Parliament ===
The parliament was opened by Governor General Sam Mostyn on 22 July 2025.

- 23 July 2025: Greens Senator Mehreen Faruqi is sanctioned by the Senate for holding up a sign during Mostyn's address; reading "Gaza is starving/Words won't feed them/Sanction Israel".
- 24 July 2025: Senators for Pauline Hanson's One Nation turn their backs during the Senate Welcome to Country, prompting criticism from the government and the Greens.
- 29 July 2025: Education minister Jason Clare announces legislation to increase standards at childcare centres in the wake of sexual abuse scandals.
- 31 July 2025: Government legislation to cut HECS/HELP debts by 20% passes the Senate.
- 28 August 2025: Government legislation to enshrine penalty rates in law passes the Senate.
- 10 September 2025: Sussan Ley removes Jacinta Nampijinpa Price from her shadow ministry over comments by Price that suggested that the government was specifically bringing in Indian migrants as they were more likely to vote Labor.
- 3 October 2025: Andrew Hastie quits the Ley shadow ministry over disagreements about immigration policy.
- 27 November 2025: Barnaby Joyce quits the Nationals and moves to the crossbench to sit as an independent. This reduces the Coalition down from 43 seats in the House to 42 seats.
- 8 December 2025: Joyce joins One Nation, becoming the party's first member of the House of Representatives in the 48th parliament.
- 22 January 2026: David Littleproud announces that all National Party members have left the shadow cabinet, and that the Nationals are no longer party to the Coalition agreement.
- 8 February 2026: The Liberals and the Nationals reunify, agreeing that shadow cabinet decisions could no longer be overturned by neither individual party, but instead only be overturned by a joint Coalition Party room
- 13 February 2026: Angus Taylor successfully spills Sussan Ley for the leadership of the Liberal Party, becoming Leader of the Opposition.
- 17 February 2026: Taylor announces his shadow ministry.
- 10 March 2026: David Littleproud announces resignation as the leader of the National Party, but will remain as the National MP for the Division of Maranoa.
- 11 March 2026: Matt Canavan becomes leader of the National Party
- 16 March 2026: Canavan announces a reshuffle of National Party portfolios in the shadow ministry.
- 9 May 2026: David Farley wins the 2026 Farrer by-election as the One Nation candidate, giving them two MPs.
- 12 May 2026: Treasurer Jim Chalmers delivers the 2026–27 Federal Budget
- 14 May 2026: Senator Tammy Tyrrell announces that she has joined the Labor Party, giving Labor thirty seats in the Senate.
- 25 June 2026: Zali Steggall and Allegra Spender announce the formation of the Community Strong Australia Party, with registration expected to be finalised by October.
- 28 September 2026: Senator Larissa Waters steps down as leader of the Australian Greens, citing health issues related to chronic kidney disease. She remains a Senator.
- 30 September 2026: Senator David Shoebridge is elected leader of the Australian Greens, defeating Mehreen Faruqi and Sarah Hanson-Young in a contested leadership election.

=== Pre-election standings ===
Parties are listed according to their vote share at the last federal election.

Affiliation	House			Senate		
Affiliation	Results of the 2025 election	As of 25 June 2026	Change	Results of the 2025 election	As of 25 June 2026	Change
Labor	94	94	0	28	30	▲2
Liberal	28	27	▼1	23	23	0
National	15	14	▼1	4	4	0
The Greens	1	1	0	11	10	▼1
One Nation	0	2	▲2	4	4	0
Lambie Network	0	0	0	1	1	0
Katter's Australian	1	1	0	0	0	0
Australia's Voice	0	0	0	1	1	0
Centre Alliance	1	1	0	0	0	0
United Australia	0	0	0	1	1	0
Community Strong	Did not exist	2	▲2	Did not exist	0	0
Independents (Note: Includes David Pocock who is registered with the Electoral Commission under the party "David Pocock" for ballot purposes.)	10	8	▼2	3	2	▼1
Vacant	0	0	0	0	0	0
Total seats	150			76		

== Electoral system ==
Members of the House of Representatives are elected by full preferential voting. Each electorate elects one member. Senators are elected by proportional representation using single transferable vote. In states, senators are elected from state-wide twelve-member districts (although in most cases only six seats are contested at a single election), and in territories from territory-wide two-member districts. Ballots are counted at least twice, at the polling place and, starting Monday night after election day, at counting centres.

=== Redistribution ===
The Australian Electoral Commission (AEC) is required, one year after the first sitting day for a new House of Representatives, to determine the number of members to which each state and territory is entitled. If the number in any state changes, a redistribution would be required in those states. A redistribution would be postponed if it would begin within one year of the expiration of the House of Representatives.

Notwithstanding the above, Queensland, Tasmania, South Australia and the Australian Capital Territory need to undergo redistributions in 2025 and 2026 as seven years have elapsed since their last respective redistributions.

On 8 July 2026, the electoral commission announced minor changes to its redistribution of the Australian Capital Territory. Under the revised boundaries, all suburbs within the Woden Valley, previously located in the division of Canberra, were transferred to the division of Bean, while the suburbs of Hume and Symonston, previously in Bean, were moved into Canberra.

On 15 July, the electoral commission announced the final redistribution for Tasmania. Under the new boundaries, the Break O'Day Council area was transferred from the division of Lyons to the division of Bass, while the Glenorchy City Council area was moved from Bass to Lyons. Significant changes were also made to the division of Clark and the division of Franklin. Clark was expanded to incorporate the Huon Valley, previously in Franklin, as well as the remainder of the Kingborough Council area, of which it had previously covered only a portion. Franklin, in turn, was reconfigured from Australia's southernmost electorate into one centred on Tasmania's south-east coast. The commission also proposed renaming the electorate to Tongerlongeter, in honour of the prominent Aboriginal Tasmanian leader who resisted British colonisation during the early colonial period.

On 20 July, the electoral commission announced the final redistribution for South Australia. The redistribution largely adopted the boundaries proposed in March, with the division of Barker gaining part of the Alexandrina Council area and the localities of Callington and Kanmantoo from the division of Mayo. The division of Boothby gained the remainder of the City of Mitcham from Mayo, while the division of Makin gained part of the City of Salisbury south of the Little Para River from the division of Spence. The commission also confirmed that the division of Grey would be renamed to O'Donoghue, in honour of Lowitja O'Donoghue, a prominent Aboriginal Australian leader and advocate for Aboriginal and Torres Strait Islander health and rights.

=== Voter registration ===
Enrolment of eligible voters is compulsory. Voters must notify the AEC within eight weeks of a change of address or after turning 18. The electoral rolls are closed for new enrolments or update of details about a week after the issue of writs for election. Enrolment is optional for 16 or 17-year-olds, but they cannot vote until they turn 18, and persons who have applied for Australian citizenship may also apply for provisional enrolment which takes effect on the granting of citizenship.

== Election date ==
=== Guidelines of the election date ===
The date and type of federal election is determined by the Prime Minister – after a consideration of constitutional requirements, legal requirements, as well as political considerations – who advises the Governor-General to set the process in motion by dissolving either or both houses and issuing writs for election for the House of Representatives and territorial senators. The Constitution of Australia does not require simultaneous elections for the Senate and the House of Representatives, but it has long been preferred that elections for the two houses take place simultaneously. The most recent House-only election took place in 1972, and the most recent Senate-only election took place in 1970. The last independently dated Senate election writ occurred during the Gair Affair in 1974. Federal elections must be held on a Saturday which has been the case since the 1913 federal election.

Subject to those considerations, an election for the House of Representatives can be called at any time before the expiration of the three-year term of the House of Representatives The term of the House of Representatives starts on the first sitting day of the House following its election and runs for a maximum of three years, but the House can be dissolved earlier. The date of the first sitting can be extended provided that "There shall be a session of the Parliament once at least in every year, so that twelve months shall not intervene between the last sitting of the Parliament in one session and its first sitting in the next session, but subject to the requirement that the House shall meet not more than 30 days after the date appointed for the return of the writs." The actual date of the election is later. Between 10 and 27 days must be allowed for nominations, and the actual election would be set between 21 and 31 days after the close of nominations. Accordingly, between 31 and 58 days must be allowed after the issue of the writs to the election.

The term of senators ends on 30 June either three (for half the senators if it follows a double-dissolution) or six years after their election. Elections of senators at a half-Senate election must take place in the year before the terms expire, except if parliament is dissolved earlier. The terms of senators from the territories align with House elections. The latest date that a half-Senate election can be held must allow time for the votes to be counted and the writs to be returned before the newly elected senators take office on 1 July. This took over a month in 2016, so practically, the date in which a half-Senate election is to take place must be between 1 July of the year before Senate terms expire until mid-May of the expiry year.

A double dissolution cannot take place within six months before the date of the expiry of the House of Representatives.

The Constitutional and legal provisions which impact on the choice of election dates include:

- Section 12 of the Constitution says: "The Governor of any State may cause writs to be issued for the election of Senators for that State"
- Section 13 of the Constitution provides that the election of senators shall be held in the period of twelve months before the places become vacant.
- Section 28 of the Constitution says: "Every House of Representatives shall continue for three years from the first sitting of the House, and no longer, but may be sooner dissolved by the Governor-General."
- Section 32 of the Constitution says: "The writs shall be issued within ten days from the expiry of a House of Representatives or from the proclamation of a dissolution thereof."
- Section 156 (1) of the CEA says: "The date fixed for the nomination of the candidates shall not be less than 10 days nor more than 27 days after the date of the writ".
- Section 157 of the CEA says: "The date fixed for the polling shall not be less than 23 days nor more than 31 days after the date of nomination".
- Section 158 of the CEA says: "The day fixed for the polling shall be a Saturday".

=== Date of this election ===
Election type	Earliest date	Latest date
Simultaneous half-Senate and House of Representatives	7 August 2027	20 May 2028
Half-Senate	7 August 2027	20 May 2028
House of Representatives	No earliest date	23 September 2028
Double dissolution (requires specific triggers)	No earliest date	18 March 2028

The election of senators must take place within one year before the terms expire for half-Senate elections, so the writs for a half-Senate election cannot be issued earlier than 1 July 2027. Since campaigns are for a minimum of 33 days, the earliest possible date for a simultaneous House and half-Senate election is Saturday, 7 August 2027. Given that the elections for the new senators must take place by 30 June 2028, the latest possible date for a half-Senate election is 20 May 2028.

The latest possible election for the House of Representatives will be subject to the conditions above, with the house scheduled to first meet on 22 July 2025. Based on this, the house will expire on 21 July 2028, 10 days after that is 31 July 2028 and 27 days after that is 27 August 2028, and 31 days after that is Wednesday 27 September 2028. Given the fixed Saturday polling day the latest possible date for a house only election is Saturday 23 September 2028.

A double dissolution (a deadlock-breaking provision to dissolve both houses of parliament) cannot be called within six months before the date of the expiry of the House of Representatives. That means that any double dissolution of the 48th Parliament would have to be granted by Friday 21 January 2028. Allowing for the same stages indicated above, the last possible date for a double dissolution election would be 18 March 2028. This can only occur if a bill that passes the House of Representatives is rejected by the Senate twice, at least three months apart.

== Retiring members ==
=== Coalition ===
- Michelle Landry (Capricornia, Qld) — announced retirement on 23 October 2026

=== Greens ===
- Senator Barbara Pocock — announced retirement on 25 August 2026

=== Other ===
- Senator Ralph Babet (United Australia Party) — announced retirement on 13 May 2025
