= Worm (marketing) =

Market research analysis tool

The "Worm" is a market research analysis tool developed by statistics company Roy Morgan, who called it "The Reactor", with the purpose of gauging an audience's reaction to some visual stimuli over some time period. The name "worm" describes its visual appearance – as a line graph snaking up or down, usually depicted on TV during live political debates.

== Background ==
Each member of the audience firstly fills out a questionnaire, used to describe the composition of the audience. Then, each member is given a control device (such as a dial or keypad) with which they select their feelings towards the vision or stimuli (for example, whether they regard the comments currently being made by a speaker favourably or unfavourably). This dial is checked centrally three times per second, and as the audience reacts differently over time, the collective feelings of the audience are gathered.

== Australian Federal Elections ==
The "worm" has been used in the televised political debates in Australian federal elections, including those between then Australian prime minister John Howard and then-leader of the opposition Kevin Rudd in 2007 and between prime minister Julia Gillard and opposition leader Tony Abbott in 2010.

== Internationally ==
In the first UK general election debate on 15 April 2010 between Labour Prime Minister Gordon Brown, Conservative leader David Cameron and Liberal Democrat leader Nick Clegg, "the worm" was used in certain segments. A study published in March 2011 suggests that the worm may influence voters.

In New Zealand, the worm has been controversially credited with increasing the support for United Future leader Peter Dunne in the 2002 election.
