= Ambulatory Payment Classification =

APCs or Ambulatory Payment Classifications are the United States government's method of paying for facility outpatient services for the Medicare (United States) program. A part of the Balanced Budget Act of 1997 made the Centers for Medicare and Medicaid Services create a new Medicare "Outpatient Prospective Payment System" (OPPS) for hospital outpatient services -analogous to the Medicare prospective payment system for hospital inpatients known as Diagnosis-related group or DRGs. This OPPS, was implemented on August 1, 2000. APCs are an outpatient prospective payment system applicable only to hospitals. Physicians are reimbursed via other methodologies for payment in the United States, such as Current Procedural Terminology or CPTs.

APC payments are made to hospitals when the Medicare outpatient is discharged from the Emergency Department or clinic or is transferred to another hospital (or other facility) which is not affiliated with the initial hospital where the patient received outpatient services. Although APCs began through the federal system of Medicare, they have also been considered for adoption by state programs, such as Medicaid, and other third-party private health insurers. If the patient is admitted from a hospital clinic or Emergency Department, then there is no APC payment, and Medicare will pay the hospital under inpatient Diagnosis-related group DRG methodology.
