= Community Strong Australia =

Centrist political party in Australia

- Abbreviation: Community Strong; CSA
- Founders: Zali Steggall; Allegra Spender
- Founded: 25 June 2026; 4 months ago
- Registered: 2 October 2026; 49 days ago
- Split from: Teal independents
- Ideology: Liberalism; Social liberalism; Green politics
- Political position: Centre
- Colours: Teal
- House of Representatives: 2 / 150
- Senate: 0 / 76

Website
- www.communitystrong.org.au

Community Strong Australia (CSA) is an Australian centrist political party formed in June 2026 by Zali Steggall and Allegra Spender. It was registered with the Australian Electoral Commission in October 2026.

== History ==
=== Background ===
Official logo with white sections

The term "teal independents" generally refers to centrist and independent politicians who have found electoral success contesting seats with a history of representatives coming from the Liberal Party. At the 2025 federal election, six teal independents were re-elected or elected.

In May 2026, Sydney independent MPs Zali Steggall and Allegra Spender, along with ACT senator David Pocock, confirmed that they were in discussions about forming a new political party. Pocock later stated he would not join the party, like teal independents Monique Ryan and Kate Chaney.

An opinion poll conducted by Fox & Hedgehog in May 2026 showed a hypothetical "Teal Party" would receive 6% of the national primary vote.

=== Formation ===
On 25 June 2026, Spender and Steggall announced that the party would be known as "Community Strong Australia".

On 2 October 2026, the party was registered with the Australian Electoral Commission (AEC).

== Policies ==
According to Steggall, the party will focus on issues including housing affordability, cost of living, climate change, childcare, education, healthcare and social cohesion.

== Members of Parliament ==
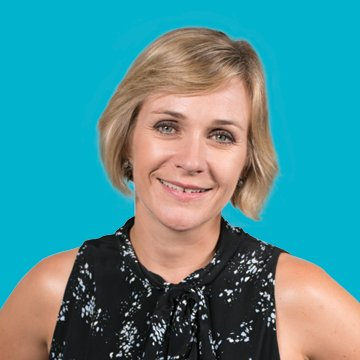
Zali Steggall
Member for Warringah
(since 25 June 2026)

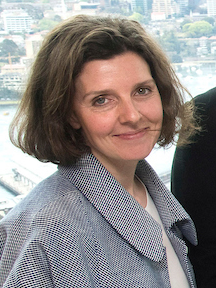
Allegra Spender
Member for Wentworth
(since 25 June 2026)

== See also ==
- Australian Democrats — centrist third-party from 1970s to early 2000s
- Centre Alliance
- Opportunity Party — centrist political party in New Zealand that uses teal branding
