= APCR =

APCR may refer to:

- Armor-piercing composite rigid - a type of armour piercing projectile
- Association for Protection of Civil Rights - a non-governmental organization
- Activated protein C resistance - a hemostatic disorder
