= Avoyelles Public Charter School =

Location
- 201 Longfellow Road; Mansura, Louisiana 71350; United States
- 31.173767°N 92.272020°W

Information
- Type: Charter school
- Motto: Engaging Minds...Moving Hearts
- Established: 2000; 26 years ago
- NCES School ID: 220003501494
- Dean: Lori Thames
- Principal: Julie C. Roy
- Teaching staff: 37.52 (on an FTE basis)
- Grades: K-12
- Enrollment: 733 (2018–19)
- Student to teacher ratio: 19.54
- Campus type: Rural
- Colors: Teal and black
- Mascot: Vikings
- Website: www.apcs.us

Avoyelles Public Charter School is a K-12 charter school in Mansura, Louisiana, United States.

== History ==
The Avoyelles Public Charter School was founded as a Type 2 charter school open to any student in the state of Louisiana in 2000 by Julie C. Roy (then Julie Durand). It initially consisted of grades kindergarten through fifth, and one grade was added every year until 2008. In 2005, construction, funded through a loan from the U.S. Department of Agriculture Rural Development, began on the high school building, performing arts building and gymnasium but wasn’t completed until September 2006, postponing the school year. In 2008, the senior class became the first graduating class of the school.

== Academics ==
The Avoyelles Public Charter School offers a rigorous academic curriculum, ensuring that its students will be well prepared for college. Along with the essential subjects, there are several special classes offered. The K-8th grade programs teach French, the middle school teaches an engineering course. High school students are able to take Dual Enrollment classes, allowing students to earn college credits while learning more advanced skills, giving students an advantage upon entering a secondary-education program. Currently offered Dual Enrollment courses include College Algebra, Trigonometry, Pre-calculus, Speech, and two Englishes. More Dual Enrollment courses can be taken online via the Louisiana Virtual School. College credit can also be earned by taking AP courses via the Louisiana Virtual School and taking engineering courses. AP courses require students to score at a certain level on its respectable exam in order to receive college credit. The engineering courses have a similar requirement.

Students enjoy taking classes through the previously mentioned Louisiana Virtual School, because it allows them to pursue their interests in countless courses.

APCS offers many electives including choir, show choir, musical theatre, art, ceramics, web design, publications, band, percussion, French, debate, physical education, health, and, personal fitness.

In 2009, APCS established its edible schoolyard where students are involved in growing organic vegetables and flowers. However, this program was discontinued in 2011.

== Data and statistics ==
The Louisiana Department of Education issues School Performance Scores each year for every school in the state. Four indices are used to calculate the score which are Attendance, Assessment, Dropout, and Graduation. The school received a score of 114 in 2010 earning the school a three star label for the score. The school had a 96.2% attendance rate for the 2009-2010 academic year. 63.5% of the classes were taught by highly qualified teachers in 2009-2010.

== Athletics ==
Avoyelles Public Charter School athletics competes in the LHSAA.

Sports offered:

- Baseball
- Basketball
- Cheerleading
- Cross Country
- Softball

The Charter Vikings boys' basketball team won their first state title on March 10, 2023.
