= Mary Walker Landing Zone =

- IATA: APH; ICAO: KAPH; FAA LID: APH

Summary
- Airport type: Military
- Owner: United States Army
- Location: Fort Walker, Virginia
- Elevation AMSL: 220 ft / 67 m
- Coordinates: 38°04′08″N 077°19′06″W
- Interactive map of Mary Walker Landing Zone

Runways
Direction	Length		Surface
Direction	ft	m	Surface
5/23	2,202	671	Turf
- Source: Federal Aviation Administration

The Mary Walker Landing Zone (formerly A.P. Hill Army Airfield, IATA: APH, ICAO: KAPH, FAA LID: APH) is a military airport located at Fort Walker. It is two nautical miles (4 km) northwest of the central business district of Bowling Green, a town in Caroline County, Virginia, United States. The airfield has one active runway designated 5/23 with a 2,201 x 100 ft. (671 x 30 m) turf surface.
