= Division of Lyons =

Australian federal electoral division

Coordinates: 42.082°S 147.073°E

Lyons Australian House of Representatives Division
- Interactive map of boundaries since the 2019 federal election
- Created: 1984
- MP: Rebecca White
- Party: Labor
- Namesake: Joseph Lyons and Dame Enid Lyons
- Electors: 85,243 (2022)
- Area: 35,721 km^{2} (13,792.0 sq mi)
- Demographic: Rural and provincial
- State electorate: Lyons
Electorates around Lyons:
| Braddon | Bass | Tasman Sea |
| Braddon | Lyons | Tasman Sea |
| Braddon | Franklin | Clark; Tasman Sea |

The Division of Lyons (/laɪənz/) is an Australian electoral division in Tasmania.

The division covers a large part of central Tasmania, spanning from the southern outskirts of Launceston to the northern suburbs of Hobart. With effect at the next general election, the division would become landlocked and no longer border any coastline of Tasmania.

== Geography ==
Since 1984, federal electoral division boundaries in Australia have been determined at redistributions by a redistribution committee appointed by the Australian Electoral Commission. Redistributions occur for the boundaries of divisions in a particular state, and they occur every seven years, or sooner if a state's representation entitlement changes or when divisions of a state are malapportioned.

When the division was created in 1984 to replace the abolished Division of Wilmot, it covered most of central Tasmania and bordered the northern, western and eastern coasts of Tasmania. In 2017, the division lost its northern and western coasts and only bordered the east coast of Tasmania, but still occupied a large part of central Tasmania. This included places as New Norfolk, Deloraine and St Marys, as well as the outer northern suburbs of Hobart.

In the 2026 redistribution, Lyons lost the entire east coast (such as St Marys) to the divisions of Bass and Franklin. It then no longer bordered any coastline of Tasmania and hence became landlocked within the state. However, it also gained additional urban areas within northern Hobart, gaining the Glenorchy local government area from the Division of Clark.

With effect at the next general election, the division covers the entire local government areas of Glenorchy, Derwent Valley, Central Highlands, Southern Highlands, Northern Highlands, Meander Valley and Kentish.

== History ==
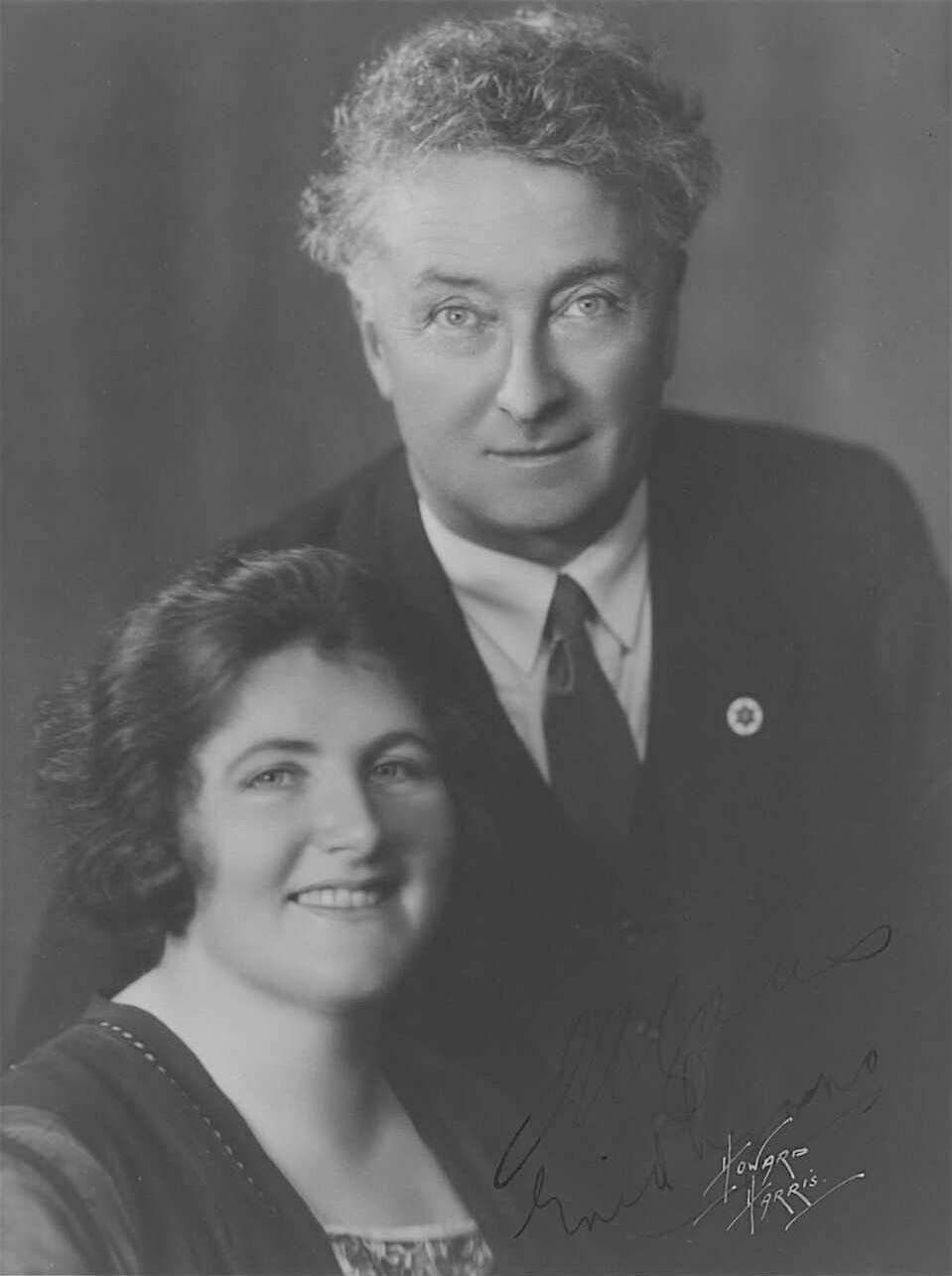
Joseph and Dame Enid Lyons, the division's namesakes

The division was created at the Federal redistribution of 12 September 1984 as a reconfigured version of the abolished Division of Wilmot. The name jointly honours Joseph Lyons, Prime Minister of Australia 1932–39, Member for Wilmot from 1929–39, and his wife Dame Enid Lyons, the first woman elected to the Australian House of Representatives (1943) and subsequently the first female member of Cabinet (1949–51). Joseph Lyons had also previously represented Wilmot at the state level from 1909 to 1929.

It has been a marginal seat, changing hands between the Labor Party and the Liberal Party.

== Members ==
| Image | Member | Party | Term | Notes |
|---|---|---|---|---|
| | Max Burr (1939–) | Liberal | 1 December 1984 – 8 February 1993 | Previously held the Division of Wilmot. Retired |
| | Dick Adams (1951–) | Labor | 13 March 1993 – 7 September 2013 | Previously held the Tasmanian House of Assembly seat of Franklin. Lost seat |
| | Eric Hutchinson (1965–) | Liberal | 7 September 2013 – 2 July 2016 | Lost seat |
| | Brian Mitchell (1967–) | Labor | 2 July 2016 – 28 March 2025 | Retired. Later elected to the Tasmanian House of Assembly seat of Lyons in 2025 |
| | Rebecca White (1983–) | Labor | 3 May 2025 – present | Previously held the Tasmanian House of Assembly seat of Lyons. Incumbent |

== Election results ==
2025 Australian federal election: Lyons
| Party | Candidate | Votes | % | ±% |
|---|---|---|---|---|
| Labor | Rebecca White | 33,100 | 43.08 | +14.04 |
| Liberal | Susie Bower | 20,135 | 26.21 | −11.01 |
| Greens | Alistair Allan | 8,362 | 10.88 | −0.55 |
| One Nation | Shaun Broadby | 5,165 | 6.72 | +1.37 |
| Trumpet of Patriots | Sarah Graham | 3,628 | 4.72 | +4.72 |
| Shooters, Fishers, Farmers | Carlo Di Falco | 3,457 | 4.50 | +4.50 |
| Independent | Angela Offord | 2,462 | 3.20 | +3.20 |
| Citizens | Michael Phibbs | 523 | 0.68 | +0.68 |
| Total formal votes | | 76,832 | 93.08 | −0.62 |
| Informal votes | | 5,715 | 6.92 | +0.62 |
| Turnout | | 82,547 | 92.77 | +0.87 |
Two-party-preferred result
| Labor | Rebecca White | 47,316 | 61.58 | +10.66 |
| Liberal | Susie Bower | 29,516 | 38.42 | −10.66 |
| Labor hold | | Swing | +10.66 | |
