= Newspoll =

Australian opinion polling brand

- Headquarters: Australia
- Services: Research
- Website: www.theaustralian.com.au/topics/newspoll

Newspoll is an Australian opinion polling brand, published by The Australian and administered by Australian polling firm Pyxis Polling & Insights. Pyxis is founded by the team led by Dr Campbell White, who redesigned Newspoll's methodology as former APAC Head of Polling at YouGov from 2019 to 2023.

Newspoll has a long tradition of predicting Australian Federal Election results, both federal and state.

Until May 2015, Newspoll was a market research and polling company, part owned by News Corp Australia. In May 2015 administration of Newspoll was transferred to Galaxy Research. In December 2017, Galaxy Research was acquired by YouGov. In August 2023, the contract to administer Newspoll was granted to Pyxis Polling & Insights. In October 2026 it was announced that Pyxis will continue to administer the poll until at least 2030.

Newspoll's surveys of voting intention are published exclusively in The Australian. The poll is widely cited in other Australian and global media.

== Background and history ==
Newspoll was established in 1985 as a joint venture between News Limited and Yann Campbell Hoare Wheeler, which later was purchased by Millward Brown during the 1990s. In 2015 this company was wound up with The Australian announcing that henceforth Newspoll would become a polling brand administered by Galaxy. The transfer of operation to Galaxy came with a significant change in polling methods, from live telephone interviews to a mix of online and automated telephone interviews. However, the wording of Newspoll questions remained the same. In the first major test of this methodology, Newspoll conducted by Galaxy Research was the most accurate national published poll at the 2016 Australian Federal Election.

A further change occurred in November 2019, with YouGov switching to entirely online polling. Since this change, Newspoll has been consistently accurate, being ranked as the top pollster at six out of seven elections since 2020 by respected Australian Psephologist Dr Kevin Bonham, including having the final 2PP within 1% of the actual results in the Federal, South Australian, Victorian and NSW state elections as well as - the first election conducted under Pyxis - the referendum on the Voice for Aboriginal and Torres Strait Islander Australians.

== Prime minister polling ==
Two party preferred polling between the 2004 election and 2007 election by Newspoll 1993–2007 (as published in The Australian newspaper), ACNielsen 1996–2007 (as published in Fairfax newspapers), Roy Morgan 1996–2007 and Galaxy 2004–2007.

Preferred prime minister polling between the 2004 election and 2007 election by Newspoll 1987–2007 (as published in The Australian newspaper) and ACNielsen 1996–2007 (as published in Fairfax newspapers).

The lists below show the prime ministers with the highest and lowest career ratings. In many cases the highest and second-highest (etc.) or lowest and second-lowest (etc.) ratings are held by the same prime minister.

=== Highest approval rating ===
Kevin Rudd has the highest career-peak approval rating, with 71% (18–20 April 2008).
Scott Morrison has the second-highest career-peak approval rating, with 68% (22–25 April 2020 and 24–27 June 2020)
John Howard has the third-highest career-peak approval rating, with 67% (10–12 May 1996) .
Bob Hawke's highest approval rating was 62% (24–26 Jan 1986), but Newspoll did not poll until over two years after he became prime minister.

=== Highest dissatisfied rating ===
Paul Keating has the highest recorded "dissatisfied" rating, with 75% (3–5 September 1993).
Tony Abbott has the second-highest career-peak "dissatisfied" rating, with 68% (6–8 February 2015 and 20–22 February 2015).
Julia Gillard has the equal second-highest career-peak "dissatisfied" rating, with 68% (2–4 September 2011).

=== Highest "Better Prime Minister" score ===
Until mid-1991, "Better Prime Minister" ratings were only surveyed during election campaigns.

Kevin Rudd has the highest "Better Prime Minister" score, with 73% (28 Feb-2 Mar 2008 and 4–6 April 2008).
John Howard has the second-highest career-peak "Better Prime Minister" score, with 67% (20–22 June 2003).
Bob Hawke has the third-highest career-peak "Better Prime Minister" score, with 62% (5–7 June 1987 and 16–21 June 1987).

=== Lowest "Better Prime Minister" score ===
Paul Keating has the lowest "Better Prime Minister" score, with 27% (20–22 August 1993).
Tony Abbott has the second-lowest career-low "Better Prime Minister" score, with 30% (6–8 February 2015).
John Howard has the third-lowest career-low "Better Prime Minister" score, with 31% (24–6 July 1998).

== Opposition Leader polling ==
Note: The lists below show the Opposition Leaders with the highest and lowest career ratings. In many cases the highest and second-highest (etc.) or lowest and second-lowest (etc.) ratings are held by the same Opposition Leader. For instance, 14% is not the second-lowest "Better Prime Minister" score ever recorded, since Brendan Nelson recorded ten scores of below 14%.

=== Highest approval rating ===
Kevin Rudd has had the highest recorded approval rating, of 68% (16–18 February 2007 and 11–13 May 2007).
Mark Latham has the second-highest career-peak approval rating, of 66% (19–21 March 2004).
John Hewson has the third-highest career-peak approval rating, of 55% (17–19 January 1992).

=== Lowest approval rating ===
Alexander Downer recorded the lowest approval rating, of 20% (2–4 December 1994 and 16–18 December 1994).
Three leaders have recorded career-low approval ratings of 22%. They are Andrew Peacock (19–21 May 1989), John Hewson (11–13 March 1994) and Simon Crean (28–30 November 2003).

=== Highest dissatisfaction rating ===
Alexander Downer recorded the highest dissatisfaction rating, of 69% (2–4 December 1994).
Andrew Peacock recorded the second-highest career-high dissatisfaction rating, of 67% (16–18 March 1990).
John Hewson recorded the third-highest career-high dissatisfaction rating, of 64% (11–13 March 1994).

=== Highest "Better Prime Minister" score ===
Kevin Rudd holds the record with 50% (19–21 October 2007).
Alexander Downer recorded the second-highest career-peak score, of 48% (8–10 July 1994).
Bill Shorten recorded the equal second-highest career-peak score, of 48% (6–8 February 2015).

=== Lowest "Better Prime Minister" score ===
Brendan Nelson holds the record, with 7% (29 February-2 March 2008).
Simon Crean (28–30 November 2003), Malcolm Turnbull (27–29 November 2009) and Bill Shorten (4–6 December 2015) recorded the equal-second lowest career low, with 14%. See note at top of this section.

== See also ==
- Essential Media Communications
- Roy Morgan
- YouGov
