= Roy Morgan =

Australian market research company based in Melbourne

- Type: Private
- Industry: Social, political and market research
- Founded: 1941; 85 years ago
- Founder: Roy Morgan
- Headquarters: Melbourne, Australia
- Area served: Australia, New Zealand, USA, UK, Indonesia
- Key people: Gary Morgan, Executive Chairman; Michele Levine, CEO
- Products: Political polls; Social research; Market research; Media and web usage; Media planning data; Reactor (The Worm); ASTEROID (Data Analysis Software)
- Services: Market research
- Revenue: A$40 million
- Website: www.roymorgan.com

Roy Morgan, formerly known as Roy Morgan Research, is an independent Australian social and political market research and public opinion statistics company headquartered in Melbourne, Victoria. It operates nationally as Roy Morgan and internationally as Roy Morgan International. The Morgan Poll, a political poll that tracks voting intentions, is its best-known product in Australia.

== Foundation ==
The company was founded by Roy Morgan (1908–1985) in 1941. The company's current executive chairman is his son, Gary Morgan and its CEO is Michele Levine.

== Commercial performance ==
The company has annual turnover of more than A$40 million, and along with the head office in Melbourne, also has offices in Sydney, Perth and Brisbane as well as offices of Roy Morgan International in Auckland, London, New York City, Princeton and Jakarta.

The results are published on their website and by media sources (newspapers, magazines, television, radio, the Internet and online subscription services such as Crikey and Henry Thornton magazine).

== Products and services ==
=== Morgan Poll ===
The Morgan Poll is a political polling service that tracks the voting intentions of Australian voters, which caters for detailed demographic and geographic analyses of the results and is widely reported.

=== The Worm ===
Roy Morgan developed the Worm, which first appeared on live TV on the Network Ten political talk program Face to Face.

This leading Audience Response Measurement technology was colloquially described as The Worm because of the live graphs that snake their way over the television screen, displaying the audience's reactions to visual stimuli (like for example an election debate) in real-time. After being commissioned to provide The Worm to the Nine Network for a decade, Roy Morgan discovered that Nine had secretly registered 'The Worm' as a trademark. Primarily as a result of an ensuing dispute, Roy Morgan changed the branding from The Worm to The Reactor in 2004 and continued to develop the product which is now primarily conducted online and via The Reactor mobile app.

Roy Morgan conducts the fieldwork for The Melbourne Institute's Household, Income and Labour Dynamics in Australia Survey (HILDA).

== See also ==
- Essential Media Communications
- Newspoll
- YouGov
