= Essential Media Communications =

Australian market research group

- Industry: Market research Public relations
- Founded: 1997
- Founder: Tony Douglas
- Headquarters: Australia
- Owner: Peter Lewis; Peter Stahel
- Website: www.essentialmedia.com.au

Essential Media Communications is an Australian public relations and market research company known for its political campaigns and opinion polls.

== History and work ==
Essential Media Communications was founded in 1997 by Tony Douglas, with the Australian Education Union as its first client.

In 2004, it launched the inaugural Essential Report, the result of regular public polling on social issues in Australia. It was originally published in partnership with Crikey, but subsequently established a relationship with Guardian Australia, and is published for free by The Guardian. Executive Director Peter Lewis is also a regular columnist for Guardian Australia.

Some of Essential's notable work and campaigns include:

- "Your Rights at Work" for the ACTU ahead of Labor's win at the 2007 federal election.
- Australian Greens national advertising campaign for the 2010 federal election.
- Every Australian Counts, a grassroots campaign to create the National Disability Insurance Scheme that was launched in 2011.
- Adam Goodes' anti-racism campaign entitled "Racism, It Stops With Me"
- Rosie Batty's campaigns to prevent family violence
- part of research team for Labor's winning campaign at the 2022 federal election.

== Governance ==
The company is co-owned by Executive Director Peter Lewis and Managing Director Peter Stahel.

== The Essential Report ==
The Essential Report is a regular poll of topical political and social issues in Australia. It is published fortnightly by the Guardian Australia. Further detail, including the wording of each question and breakdowns of demographic groups, are published online at essentialreport.com.au. People can sign up to receive summaries by email for free.

Essential Media also publishes its methodology and compliance with Australian Polling Council Quality Mark standards. All of its polling is done online. While it asks the "voting intention" question of its respondents twice in order to eliminate the "Don't Knows", it eliminates the remaining Don't Knows in its reporting.

== See also ==
- Newspoll
- Roy Morgan
- YouGov
