= Akira Isogawa =

Australian fashion designer

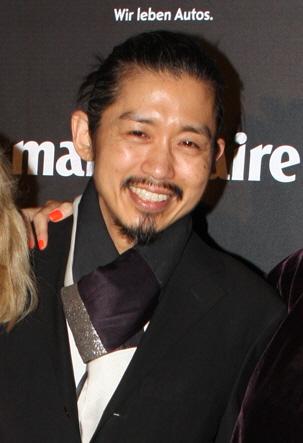
Isogawa at 2013 Prix de marie claire Awards, in March 2013

Akira Isogawa (五十川明, Isogawa Akira; born 25 December 1964) is an Australian contemporary fashion designer.

== Early life ==
Born in Kyoto, Japan in 1964, he emigrated to Australia in 1986 at the age of 21. In his early 20s, Isogawa worked in Japanese restaurants and as a tour guide. He studied fashion at the East Sydney Technical College, drawing inspiration from contemporary Japanese design.

== Career ==
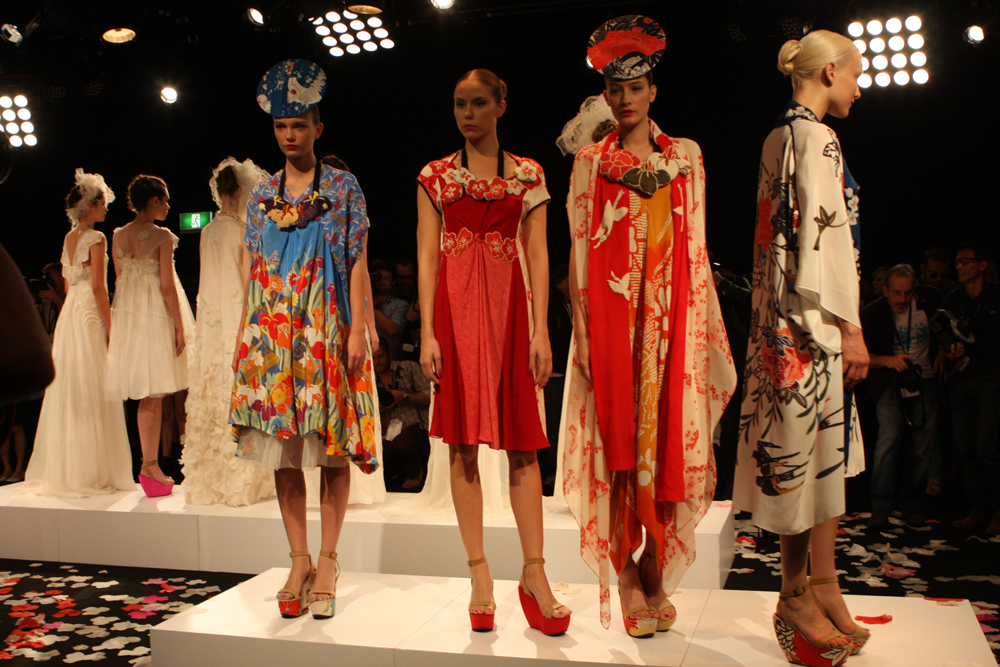
Isogawa creations on parade at Mercedes Benz Fashion Week in Sydney, Australia (May 2012)

Isogawa opened a store in Woollahra, Sydney, in 1993.

By the late 1990s, he was known internationally. His clothes appear under his own label and are sold in Australia and New Zealand, and 10 other countries. He is one of the few Australian designers to exhibit and sell his clothing in Paris, His commercial fashion label, Akira, concentrates on women's fashion.

== Other ==
Isogawa's designs have been exhibited in a number of major Australian galleries. A number of his lavish costume creations while a student survive in a catalogued retrospective of the RAT Party era kept at Sydney's Powerhouse Museum. He has also worked as a costume designer for the Sydney Dance Company.

In 1999, Australian Fashion Industry Awards named Isogawa as a Designer of the Year and Womenswear Designer of the Year.

Isogawa has also designed three rug collections with Designer Rugs, using prints from his fashion designs. The first collection launched in 2005, followed by 'Kisetsu' in 2007, and "Hirameki' in 2012.

Isogawa has a passion for animals and incorporates his beliefs into his design philosophy. "I consider myself a compassionate member of society. I understand that our actions impact on all living beings and wonder why we resort to such cruelty when there are so many man-made materials that we can use." In 2011, he joined the council of Voiceless, the animal protection institute.

Sydney's Museum of Applied Arts and Sciences showed the retrospective Akira Isogawa in 2018–2019, and his work was included in the Victoria and Albert Museum's 2020 exhibition Kimono: Kyoto to Catwalk in London.

== Honours ==
In 2005, he was honoured on a commemorative Australian postage stamp, along with other Australian fashion designers, Collette Dinnigan, Carla Zampatti, Joe Saba, Jenny Bannister and Prue Acton.
