= Prue Acton =

Australian fashion designer

Prue Acton, OBE (born 26 April 1943) is an Australian fashion designer, often referred to as "Australia's golden girl of fashion" during the 1960s.

== Early life ==
Prudence Leigh Acton was born in Benalla, Victoria and educated at Firbank Anglican Girls' Grammar School in Melbourne. Between 1958 and 1962 she completed a Diploma of Art majoring in Printed Textiles at Royal Melbourne Institute of Technology.

== Career ==
In 1963 Acton established her own fashion design business in Flinders Lane, Melbourne, and by age 21 she was turning over 350 designs a year and selling an average of 1,000 dresses a week through 80 outlets in Australia and New Zealand. As her fashion business took off, Acton also began to develop her own range of cosmetics to complement the range. In 1967, she became the first Australia female designer to mount a show of her own range of garments in New York. By 1982 the estimated world-wide sales of her designs were $11 million with garments sold in Australia, Japan, United States, Canada and New Zealand and her designs made under licence in America, Japan, and Germany.

Acton also designed the Australian Olympic uniforms for 1980, Lake Placid, US); 1984, Los Angeles; and 1988, Seoul.

Acton initially wanted to become a traditional artist – a painter – before focusing on fashion. "At 15 I went to RMIT; I was one of the youngest ever to go to RMIT." Acton says about her art studies that led up to her fashion career, "And during that time I was making my own clothes and making clothes for friends and that's how I was making pocket money". Right after graduating, Acton worked on clothing samples, and began her business. At the start of her career, she wrote a fashion column for the journal Go-Set. Acton was the first Australian female designer to show her own fashion range in New York.

In 1994, she donated her collection jointly to Museums Victoria and the Frances Burke Textile Resource Centre at RMIT University - now the RMIT Design Archives.

Acton returned to painting in the 1980s. She shifted her focus away from fashion because "it's all about making money, and I'm becoming far more interested in painting". Acton found the art forms to be similar: "I don't think it makes any difference whether I'm painting or I'm a designer, it's about the art of what we do, of how the parts come together". She attended life drawing classes at Swinburne College, and studied painting with Clifton Pugh and Mervyn Moriarty. From 1989, Acton held exhibitions with Clifton Pugh and the Dunmoochin Artists.

For 30 years Acton ran workshops with her partner, Mervyn Moriarty OAM, founder of the Australian Flying Arts School, now the Flying Arts Alliance, an arts and cultural development organisation offering visual arts projects and services in regional and remote Queensland since 1971.

In recent years, Acton has devoted herself to colour and colour theory. In January 2019, she and Moriarty showcased their Colour Wheel at Creativeworld, the 2019 International Frankfurt Arts and Crafts Trade Fair. They were joint authors on an article in Australian Art Education in 2020 describing how the Three-Section Colour Wheel combines the primaries of pigment and of light into one system.

Acton incorporates nature in both colour and form. She describes herself as a colourist with an interest in subjects like flowers and fruit, and the handcrafted vessels central to our domestic lives. Her aim is to bridge the aesthetic space between the environment and human lives, using soft pastels on fine-sanded prepared paper surfaces. She uses yellows of pure pigment with no oil.

== Designers working with Prue Acton ==
- Marcos Davidson
- Maree Menzel
- Myra Jane Sinn

== Awards ==
- Australian Wool Board Wool Fashion Awards, 1965, 1966, 1969, 1970, 1971
- David Jones Awards for Fashion Excellence, 1971, 1972, 1978
- FIA (Fashion Industry of Australia) Lyrebird Awards 1971, 1973 (Hall of Fame), 1978, 1980
- Awarded OBE (Officer of the Most Excellent Order of the British Empire), 1982
- Australian Fashion Awards, 1985, 1987
- In 2005, Acton was honoured on a commemorative Australian postage stamp, along with other Australian fashion designers, Collette Dinnigan, Akira Isogawa, Joe Saba, Carla Zampatti and fellow RMIT alumna Jenny Bannister.
- Honorary Doctorate of Arts, RMIT University, 2007
