= Jenny Bannister =

Australian fashion designer

- Born: 1954; Australia
- Occupation: Fashion designer

Jenny Bannister is an Australian fashion designer, based in Melbourne.

== Early life ==
Bannister was born in 1954 in Mildura, Victoria to parents Owen and Peg. As a teenager she moved to Melbourne with her sister Wendy. Bannister studied Fashion Design and Production at RMIT's Emily McPherson College, graduating in 1974. After graduation, she worked at fashion boutiques on Melbourne's Chapel Street before starting her own fashion label.

== Career ==
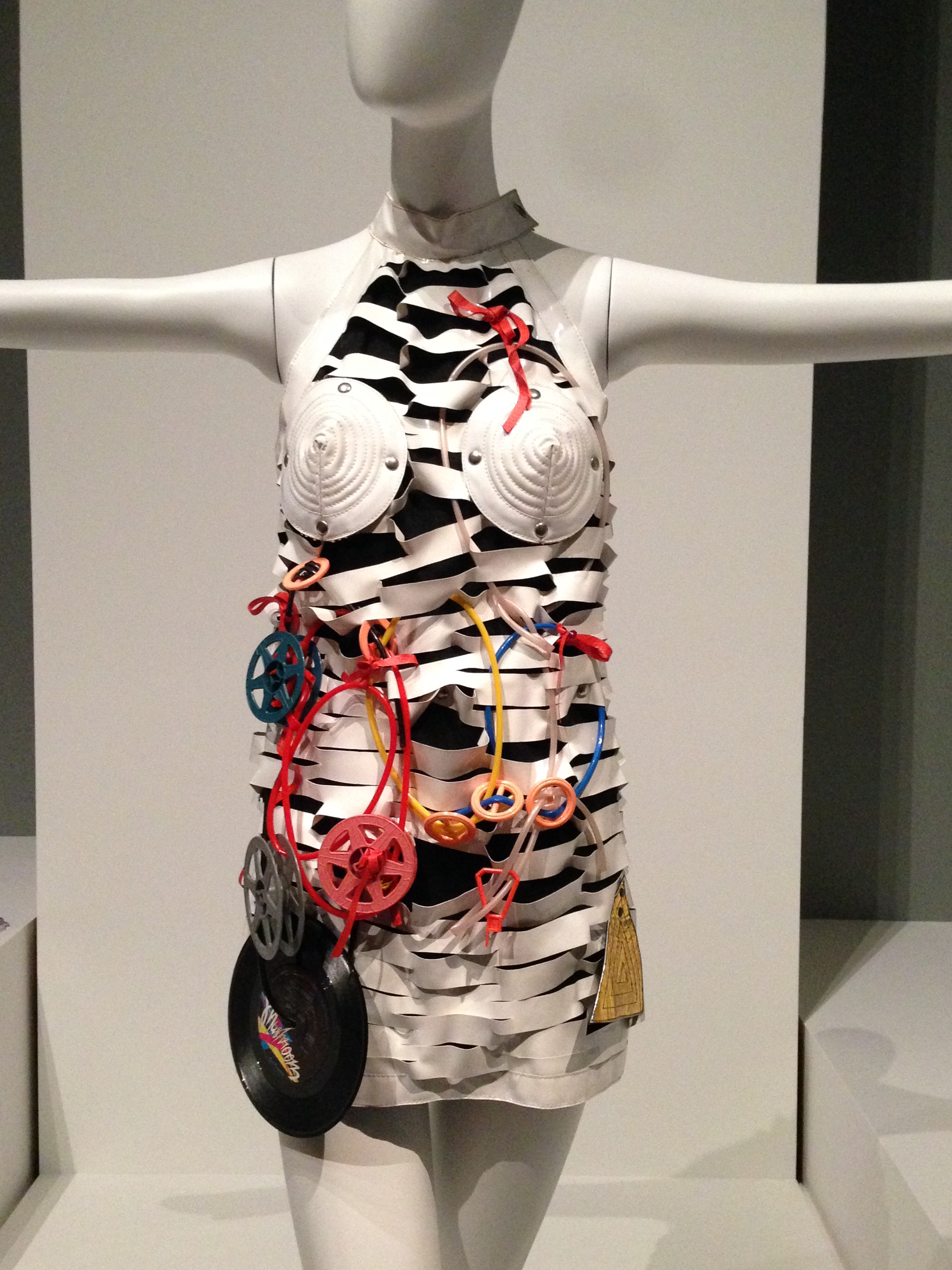
Je suis mod deluxe

In 1976, Bannister launched her own label, Jenny Bannister Fashion, in Melbourne. The Bannister label began at the height of the 1970s radical fashion movement, and later evolved into couture and up-market boutique styles.

During the 1980s Bannister's work showed in events held by the Fashion Design Council, an organisation that supported emerging and alternative fashion. In 1988, Bannister successfully shifted into contemporary evening wear, to which she now has a loyal celebrity following. Her designs are featured prominently in the Melbourne Fashion Festival and her pieces have also recently been auctioned at Christie's in London.

Due to her creative and distinctive approach to design, many significant pieces of Bannister's work have been collected by major art galleries and museums. The National Gallery of Victoria is collecting Bannister's work from the 1970s and 1980s for their archives, and included select pieces in the 2016 exhibition 200 Years of Australian Fashion.

In 2005, Bannister was honoured on a commemorative Australian postage stamp, along with other Australian fashion designers, Collette Dinnigan, Akira Isogawa, Joe Saba, Carla Zampatti and fellow RMIT alum Prue Acton.

In 2021 Bannister curated an exhibition for RMIT, drawing from the University's art collection and design archives to showcase RMIT's history as an incubator of design.
