= Jean Spender =

Australian writer (1901–1970)

Jean Maud Spender nee Henderson, Lady Spender (1902 – 25 March 1970) was an Australian writer.

She was born in Burwood, New South Wales to parents Sam Brown Henderson and May Kathleen Henderson.

Spender attended Presbyterian Ladies' College, Croydon and Presbyterian Ladies' College, Pymble. She knew she wanted to be a novelist, but did not start writing until after she was married.

On 6 April 1925, she married the then-barrister Sir Percy Spender at Coraki in Northern New South Wales. Percy later became a politician and diplomat and was made KCVO, KBE, QC.

The couple had two sons. One son, John Spender, was also a politician and diplomat. The other, Peter Beaufort Spender, wrote and produced several documentary films.

Jean Spender wrote crime thrillers and detective novels, often under the pen name "J. M. Spender". Most are set in Sydney with a lightly disguised Percy Spender as the hero. In 1968, she published Ambassador's Wife, which provides a rich record of Percy's time as Australia’s Ambassador to the USA from 1951 to 1958. According to a review in The Canberra Times:

"Lady Spender did not set out to write a political biography of her husband, but to give a "woman's view of life in politics, diplomacy and international law. As her involvement in these activities arose from her husband's role as politician, ambassador, justice (and later President) of the International Court of Justice, it is not surprising that she should feature the high lights of his career."

Lady Spender was also chairman of the Women's Auxiliary Australian Air Force (WAAAF).

Spender was an aunt of Dale Spender, feminist scholar, teacher and writer, and the grandmother of Allegra Spender, elected as the Member of Parliament for Wentworth in 2022, and Bianca Spender, Australian fashion designer.

Lady Jean Spender died on 25 March 1970 in Sydney.

== Bibliography ==
- The Charge Is Murder!, Sydney: Dymocks, 1933 (novel)
- Death Comes in the Night, London: Eyre and Spottiswoode, 1938 (novel)
- Full Moon for Murder, London: Evans Brothers, 1948 (novel)
- Seven Days for Hanging, London: Robert Hale, 1958 (novel)
- Murder on the Prowl, London: Robert Hale, 1960 (novel)
- Death Renders Account, London: Robert Hale, 1960 (novel)
- Ambassador's Wife, Sydney: Angus and Robertson, 1968 (autobiography)
