= Carla Zampatti =

Australian fashion designer (1938–2021)

Carla Zampatti AC OMRI
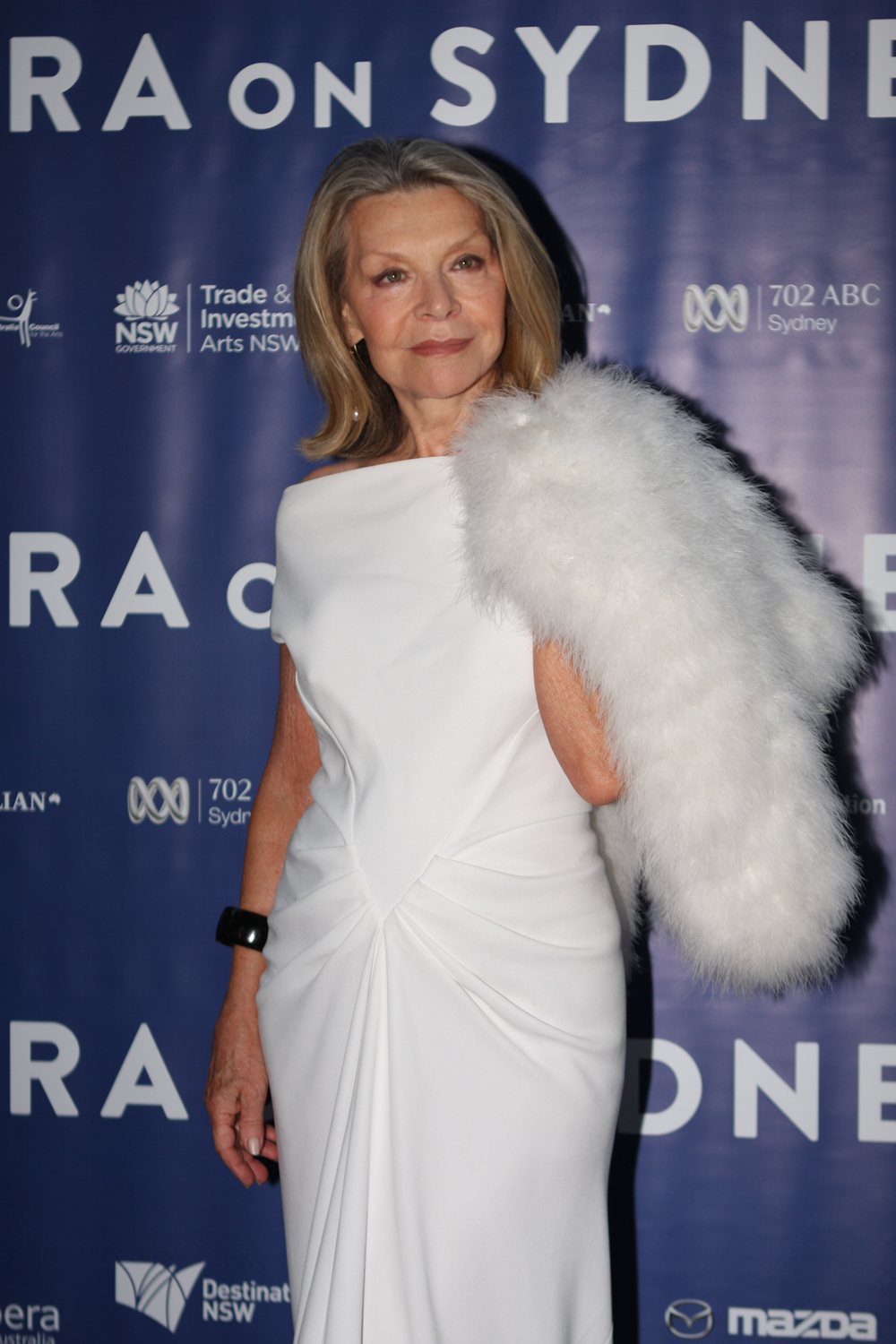
- Zampatti in 2012
- Born: 19 May 1938; Lovero, Lombardy, Italy
- Died: 3 April 2021 (aged 82); Sydney, New South Wales, Australia
- Citizenship: Australian
- Label: Carla Zampatti Limited
- Spouses: Leo Schuman (m. 1964; div. 1970) John Spender (m. 1975; div. 2010)
- Children: 3 (including Bianca and Allegra)

Carla Maria Zampatti AC, OMRI (19 May 1938 – 3 April 2021) was an Australian fashion designer and businesswoman, and executive chair of the fashion label Carla Zampatti Limited.

== Early life ==
Zampatti was born in 1938 in Lovero, a small Italian village in the Valtellina region of Lombardy. She was the youngest of three children and only daughter born to Marianna (née Caratti) and Domenico Zampatti.

Zampatti's father had immigrated to Australia in 1938 to join his brother-in-law in Western Australia, unaware that his wife was pregnant with a third child and intending to bring his family across at a later date. When Italy joined the war in 1940, he was interned as an enemy alien the next day, leaving his wife and children in Italy without a source of income. Zampatti and her mother were eventually able to move to Australia in 1950. They joined her father who was working for the Western Mining Corporation in Bullfinch, living in fibro housing.

Zampatti attended school in Bullfinch until the age of 14, when she began working as an assistant in the town's only shop. She and her family moved to Perth in 1960, where she began working as a cashier at a whitegoods store and later became the owner's personal assistant. She moved to Sydney in 1963.

== Career ==
In 1965, Zampatti produced her first small collection for Zampatti Pty Ltd, followed two years later by a national launch, and in 1970, by the establishment of Carla Zampatti Limited. Her clothes were appreciated and liked from the beginning. One of her early dresses, bought in 1967, was still in use for special occasions by its original purchaser in 2021 — a fact that contributed to ongoing debate about the quality and sustainability of fashion. It was worn again at the designer's funeral.

Zampatti opened her first boutique in 1972 in Surry Hills, Sydney. Over the next three years, boutiques were opened in Mosman, Double Bay and Elizabeth Street, Sydney, growing the Carla Zampatti Pty Ltd company to create a chain of 30 Carla Zampatti boutiques and concept stores across Australia. With the growth of the label, Zampatti moved into David Jones in 1990 and Myer stores in 1992, although she signed an exclusivity deal with David Jones in 2009. Australian singer of Italian descent, Tina Arena, is known to wear her pieces, as are other Australian icons Queen Mary of Denmark, Dannii Minogue, Delta Goodrem, and Ita Buttrose.

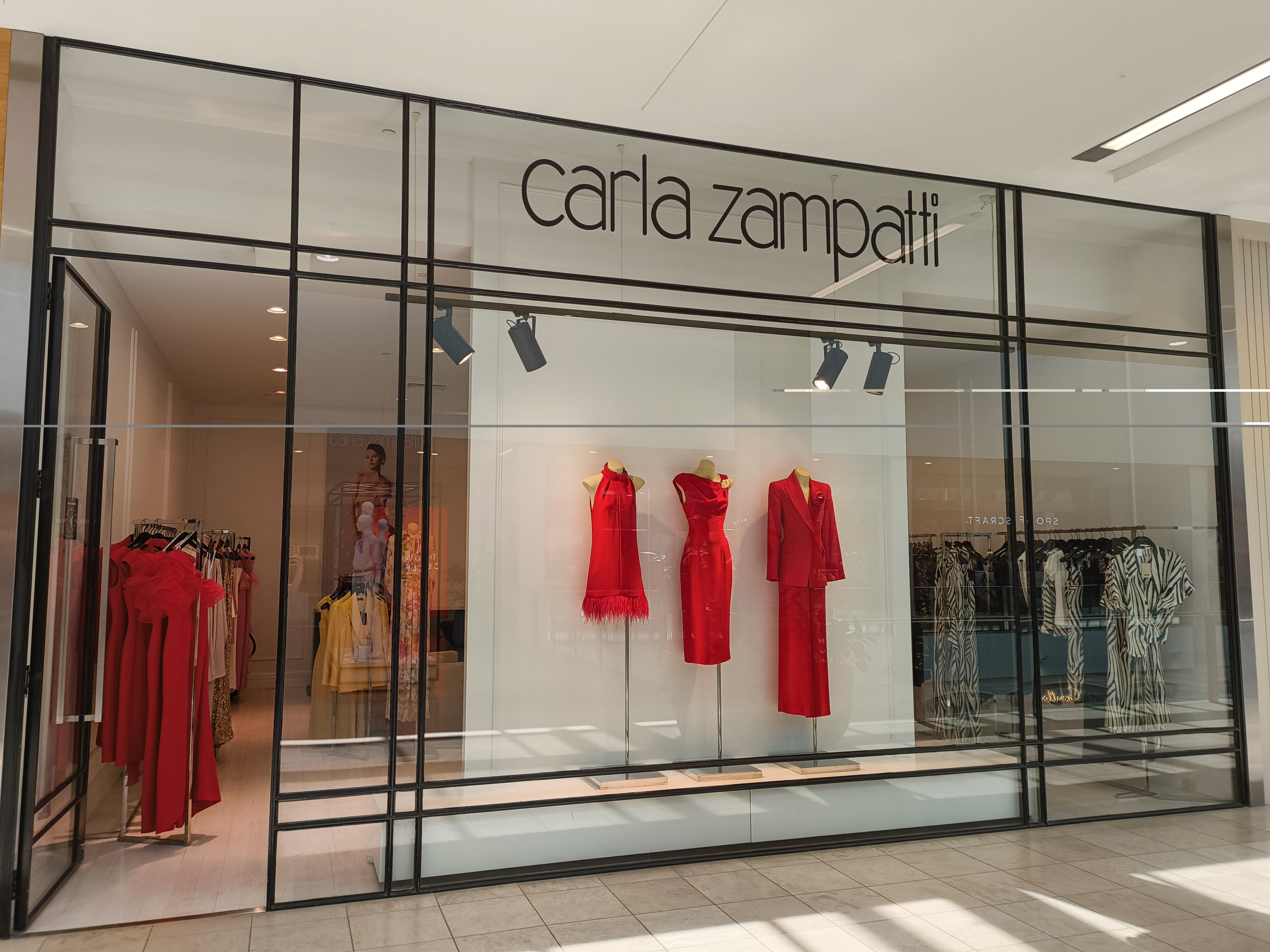
Carla Zampatti boutique in Claremont Quarter

In 1973, Zampatti became one of the first Australian designers to introduce swimwear into her collection. Expanding into other areas of fashion, she was commissioned to create the first designer eyewear of Polaroid's range. In 1983, Zampatti launched her first perfume, 'Carla'. It was a success, and she released a second in 1987, 'Bellezza'. In partnership with Ford Australia, Zampatti redesigned a car especially for the women's market. Her first Laser, produced in 1985, was followed two years later with a collection of Lasers and Meteors.

Zampatti's daughter, Bianca Spender, spent her childhood in her mother's studio which led to her interest in studying fashion in Paris. Bianca joined Carla Zampatti Limited with her own capsule collection from 2004. Bianca branched out and launched her own namesake brand in 2017.

Zampatti held a number of directorships, including chairman of the SBS Corporation, a director of the Westfield Group, and a trustee of the Art Gallery of New South Wales. She was a board member of the Australian Multicultural Foundation, the European Australian Business Council, Sydney Dance Company, MCA Foundation, and UTS V-C's Industry Advisory Board. From 1988 until her death in 2021, Zampatti served as a judge of the Ethnic Business Awards, a prestigious national award for migrant and Indigenous entrepreneurs which honours their contribution to the nation.

In 2015, HarperCollins published Zampatti's autobiography, My Life, My Look.

== Honours ==
Zampatti was appointed a Member of the Order of Australia (AM) in the 1987 Australia Day honours for service to the fashion industry as a designer and manufacturer. She was elevated as a Companion of the Order in the 2009 Queen's Birthday Honours List. In 2001 Zampatti was awarded the Centenary Medal for service to Australian society in business leadership. Zampatti was a Bulletin/Qantas Businesswoman of the Year, and in 1994 the fashion industry of Australia named her Designer of the Year.

In January 2005, Zampatti was honoured by Australia Post and named on a commemorative Australian postage stamp, along with other Australian fashion designers, Prue Acton, Jenny Bannister, Collette Dinnigan, Akira Isogawa, and Joe Saba. The award is announced annually in the lead-up to Australia Day, and its recipients are individually featured on a postage stamp. Zampatti later designed the new Australia Post corporate wear, launched in October 2007.

In 2004, the Government of Italy appointed her a Commander of the Order of Merit of the Italian Republic.

The Australian Fashion Laureate Award was given to Zampatti in August 2008. The award is polled by members of the industry, an initiative of the Government of New South Wales and IMG Fashion. It recognises outstanding achievement and is the highest honour in the Australian fashion industry.

In 1999, Zampatti was admitted as a Doctor of Letters honoris causa by the University of Western Sydney. In December 2018, the University of Wollongong also awarded her an honorary doctorate.

== Personal life ==
Zampatti was married twice: she married Leo Schuman, her first husband, in 1964. They divorced in 1970. Her second husband was politician John Spender from 1975 until they separated in 2008, and divorced in 2010.

She had three children: Alex Schuman (CEO of Carla Zampatti Pty Ltd), Allegra Spender (Member of the Australian House of Representatives for Wentworth and CEO of Carla Zampatti Pty Ltd from 2008 to 2016), and Bianca Spender (designer).

== Death ==
On 26 March 2021, Zampatti attended the opening night of La traviata at Mrs Macquarie's Chair on Sydney Harbour, where she was knocked unconscious after falling on a staircase. She was taken to St Vincent's Hospital where she died from her injuries on 3 April, at the age of 82. Zampatti's family accepted the offer of a state funeral from the New South Wales government. The service was held at St Mary's Cathedral, Sydney on 15 April 2021, where many attendees wore her designs, and her daughter Bianca said “If she was alive, she’d say this is the best-dressed funeral she had ever attended.”

Media offices
Preceded by Sir Nicholas Shehadie	Chairman of the Special Broadcasting Service; 1999–2009	Succeeded by Joseph Skrzynski
