= Percy Spender =

Australian politician (1897–1985)

The Honourable Sir Percy Spender KCVO KBE QC
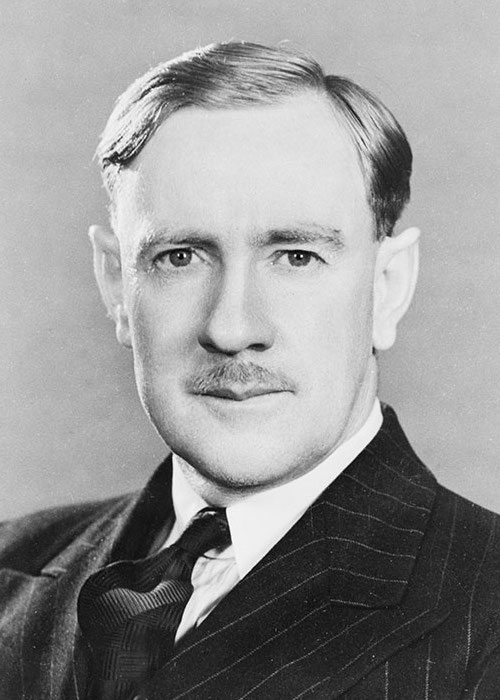
- Spender in 1940

President of the International Court of Justice
- In office 6 February 1964 – 5 February 1967
- Preceded by: Bohdan Winiarski
- Succeeded by: José Bustamante y Rivero

Judge of the International Court of Justice
- In office 6 February 1958 – 5 February 1967
- Preceded by: John Read
- Succeeded by: Charles Onyeama

5th Ambassador of Australia to the United States
- In office 31 May 1951 – 1 January 1958
- Preceded by: Norman Makin
- Succeeded by: Howard Beale

Minister for External Affairs
- In office 19 December 1949 – 26 April 1951
- Prime Minister: Robert Menzies
- Preceded by: Bert Evatt
- Succeeded by: Richard Casey

Minister for the Army
- In office 27 October 1940 – 7 October 1941
- Prime Minister: Robert Menzies; Arthur Fadden
- Preceded by: Philip McBride
- Succeeded by: Frank Forde

Treasurer of Australia
- In office 14 March 1940 – 27 October 1940
- Prime Minister: Robert Menzies
- Preceded by: Robert Menzies
- Succeeded by: Arthur Fadden

Member of the Australian Parliament for Warringah
- In office 23 October 1937 – 28 April 1951
- Preceded by: Archdale Parkhill
- Succeeded by: Francis Bland

Personal details
- Born: Percy Claude Spender; 5 October 1897 Darlinghurst, New South Wales, Australia
- Died: 3 May 1985 (aged 87) Darling Point, New South Wales, Australia
- Party: Independent (1937–1938); UAP (1938–1944); Independent (1944–1945); Liberal (from 1945)
- Spouses: Jean Henderson (m. 1925–1970) Averil Trenerry (m. 1975–1976) Eileen Esdaile (m. 1983)
- Relations: Dale Spender (great-niece); John Spender (son); Allegra Spender (granddaughter)
- Children: 2 sons
- Education: University of Sydney
- Occupation: Politician, diplomat, jurist

Sir Percy Claude Spender KCVO KBE QC (5 October 1897 – 3 May 1985) was an Australian politician, diplomat, and judge. He served in the House of Representatives from 1937 to 1951, including as a cabinet minister under Robert Menzies and Arthur Fadden. He was later Ambassador to the United States (1951–1958) and a member of the International Court of Justice (1958–1967), including as president of the court from 1964 to 1967.

== Early life ==
Spender was born on 5 October 1897 in Darlinghurst, New South Wales. He was the fifth of six children born to Mary (née Murray) and Frank Henry Spender; his father was a locksmith originally from South Australia. Spender's mother died in 1902 and his father remarried, giving him a stepsister and later two half-siblings. He began his education at Darlinghurst Public School, and later attended Fort Street High School. After failing his matriculation exam, he found work as a clerk with the Sydney City Council. Spender eventually passed the entrance exam to the University of Sydney, where he graduated Bachelor of Arts in 1918.

He enlisted in the Australian Imperial Force in September 1918, but did not see active service before the war ended a few months later. Spender subsequently completed a Bachelor of Laws, graduating in 1922 with first-class honours and the University Medal in law. He was admitted to the bar in 1923 and made a King's Counsel in 1935.

== Entry into politics ==
Spender entered politics at the 1937 election when he was elected to the House of Representatives as member for Warringah. He ran as an "independent UAP" candidate, unexpectedly defeating the sitting member, Sir Archdale Parkhill. On 20 October 1938, Spender announced that he would join the UAP, but that he would "continue to stand for independent expression of thought and action and against the principle of preselection of candidates".

== World War II ==
=== Treasurer ===
Robert Menzies became prime minister in April 1939 and appointed himself as Treasurer, as was common at the time. Spender was promoted to cabinet as a minister without portfolio, but effectively ran the Department of the Treasury in Menzies' stead. He was initially given the title "Minister without portfolio assisting the Treasurer", and then in November 1939 was named Acting Treasurer. He was a member of two subcommittees within cabinet – the Economic Cabinet and War Cabinet – and in January 1940 was additionally made Vice-President of the Executive Council. Spender was officially appointed Treasurer a few months later, in March 1940. He would later recall in his memoirs that he had been "in full charge of Treasury throughout".

Spender's primary objective as Treasurer was to accelerate the country's transition to a war economy. Australian troops were already fighting in Europe and the Middle East, and although the Pacific War would not begin until December 1941 it was believed by many that the appeasement of Japan had failed and fighting closer to home was inevitable. Spender was concerned that permanent officials at Treasury, including departmental secretary Stuart McFarlane, were not taking the situation seriously enough. He began to rely more on the advice of temporary staff and independent economists like Lyndhurst Giblin. According to political historian John Hawkins, Spender was "the most academically qualified economist among pre-WWII treasurers". He promoted interventionist Keynesian policies, such as borrowing money and raising taxes to spend on defence-related projects and thereby reduce unemployment. He also wished to control private investing so that capital would be available to the government for defence purposes, introducing requirements for private banks to place a set proportion of deposits with the Commonwealth Bank (which at the time was Australia's central bank).

=== Later activities ===
After the 1940 federal election, Arthur Fadden was elected leader of the Country Party, the UAP's coalition partner, and demanded the position of Treasurer. Spender was instead made Minister for the Army, which he would hold until the government's defeat on a confidence motion in October 1941. Anticipating Japan's entry into the war, he pressed for Australian troops to be moved from the Middle Eastern theatre closer to home. He "invited Australian generals to communicate directly with him and challenged British reassurances about the defences of Singapore".

Menzies resigned as UAP leader in October 1941, and Spender was an unsuccessful candidate for the leadership. He was eliminated on the first ballot, with Billy Hughes subsequently defeating Allan McDonald by a narrow margin. Spender was also a candidate for the UAP leadership in 1943, when Hughes resigned. He was again eliminated on the first ballot, polling only a handful of votes. In February 1944, the UAP voted to withdraw its members from the Advisory War Council. Spender refused to resign from the council, and was expelled from the UAP as a result on 23 February 1944. The party reportedly voted 21 to 5 in favour of an expulsion motion moved by Robert Menzies – who had been largely responsible for the creation of the council as a nonpartisan body. John Curtin subsequently sent Spender a letter thanking him for staying on. Billy Hughes was expelled in similar circumstances two months later.

Spender sat as an independent after being expelled from the UAP. He was approached to join the Liberal Democratic Party, a small UAP breakaway, but declined. In May 1945, Spender became a financial member of the Mosman branch of the Liberal Party of Australia. However, he was not admitted to the parliamentary Liberal Party until 13 September 1945, when the Advisory War Council was abolished. Hughes was also re-admitted at that point.

== Post-war politics ==
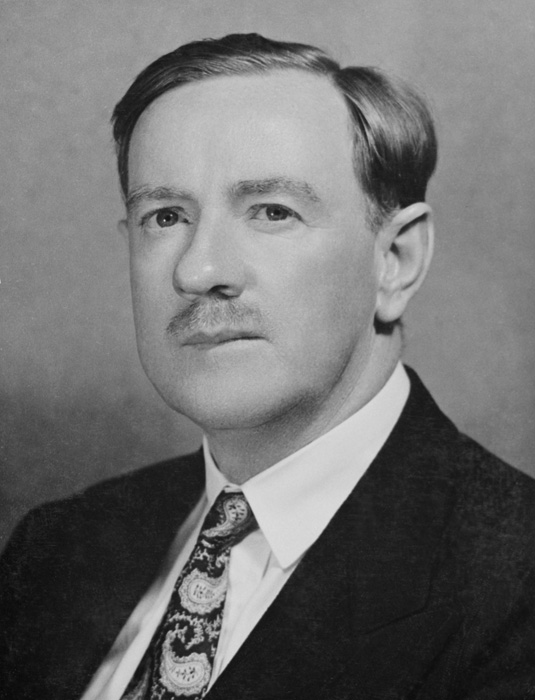
Spender in 1953

Upon Menzies' return to power in 1949, Spender was made Minister for External Affairs (19 December 1949 – 26 April 1951) and Minister for External Territories. Spender's greatest influence on Australian politics occurred during this period. He led Australian delegations to the British Commonwealth Conference in Colombo, Ceylon and to the Fifth Session of the United Nations General Assembly (of which he was the vice-president).

At the conference in Colombo, Spender was instrumental in the development of the Colombo Plan (which had originally been known as the Spender Plan). The plan saw students from Asian countries admitted to study at Australian universities, though many more came as privately sponsored students. He also played a large part in the signing of the ANZUS Pact and the Treaty of San Francisco (Japanese Peace Treaty; 1951).

Spender expressed more desire to secure alliances with 'great powers' than contribute to collective security, stating that international organisations like the UN may "contain those who are at work to disrupt the order we believe in". In this sense Spender was more akin to the realist tradition of Australian foreign politics linked to former Prime Minister Sir Robert Menzies.

== Diplomatic and judicial posts ==
1954 TV interview

On leaving politics, Spender was appointed Australia's Ambassador to the United States (1951–58).

Spender's appointment as Ambassador to the United States was seen as a possible motive by Menzies to remove a potential rival in Spender from Parliament and notwithstanding Spender had unsuccessfully stood against Menzies for the UAP leadership in 1943.

However Spender said in 1968 that Menzies only made the ambassador's offer after Spender informed Menzies that he (Spender) was leaving politics.

Spender was the first Australian appointed to the International Court of Justice in The Hague (1958–1964) and was the Court's President 1964–67. Spender died in May 1985, aged 87.

== Marriages and family ==
Spender married Jean Maud Henderson on 6 April 1925 at St Mary Magdalene Church of England, Coraki, New South Wales. She became a crime-fiction writer and they had two sons. One son, John Spender, was also a politician and diplomat who married Australian fashion designer Carla Zampatti. Jean Spender died in 1970 and on 4 October 1975 at St Mark's Church of England, Darling Point, he married Averil Watkins Trenerry, née McLeod. The marriage was short-lived and they divorced soon afterwards. He married Eileen Esdaile, née Congreve, in Honolulu, Hawaii in 1983.

His granddaughter, Allegra Spender, is also a member of parliament for Wentworth.

== Honours ==
Spender was knighted in 1952 as a Knight Commander of the Order of the British Empire. In 1957, he was further created a Knight Commander of the Royal Victorian Order. He was conferred the Grande Ufficiale Order of Merit by the Republic of Italy in 1976. He also received ten honorary doctorates. However, a personal rift between himself and Menzies prevented him from receiving the honour that he most desired, appointment to the Privy Council. He gave the commencement address at Stanford University in 1953.

Political offices
Preceded by James Fairbairn	Vice-President of the Executive Council; 1940	Succeeded by Henry Gullett
Preceded by Robert Menzies	Treasurer; 1940	Succeeded by Arthur Fadden
Preceded by Philip McBride	Minister for the Army; 1940–1941	Succeeded by Frank Forde
Preceded by H.V. Evatt	Minister for External Affairs; 1949–1951	Succeeded by Richard Casey
Preceded by Eddie Ward	Minister for External Territories; 1949–1951	Succeeded by Richard Casey
Parliament of Australia
Preceded by Sir Archdale Parkhill	Member for Warringah; 1937–1951	Succeeded by Francis Bland
Diplomatic posts
Preceded by Norman Makin	Australian Ambassador to the United States; 1951–1958	Succeeded by Sir Howard Beale
