= Maree Menzel =

Australian fashion designer

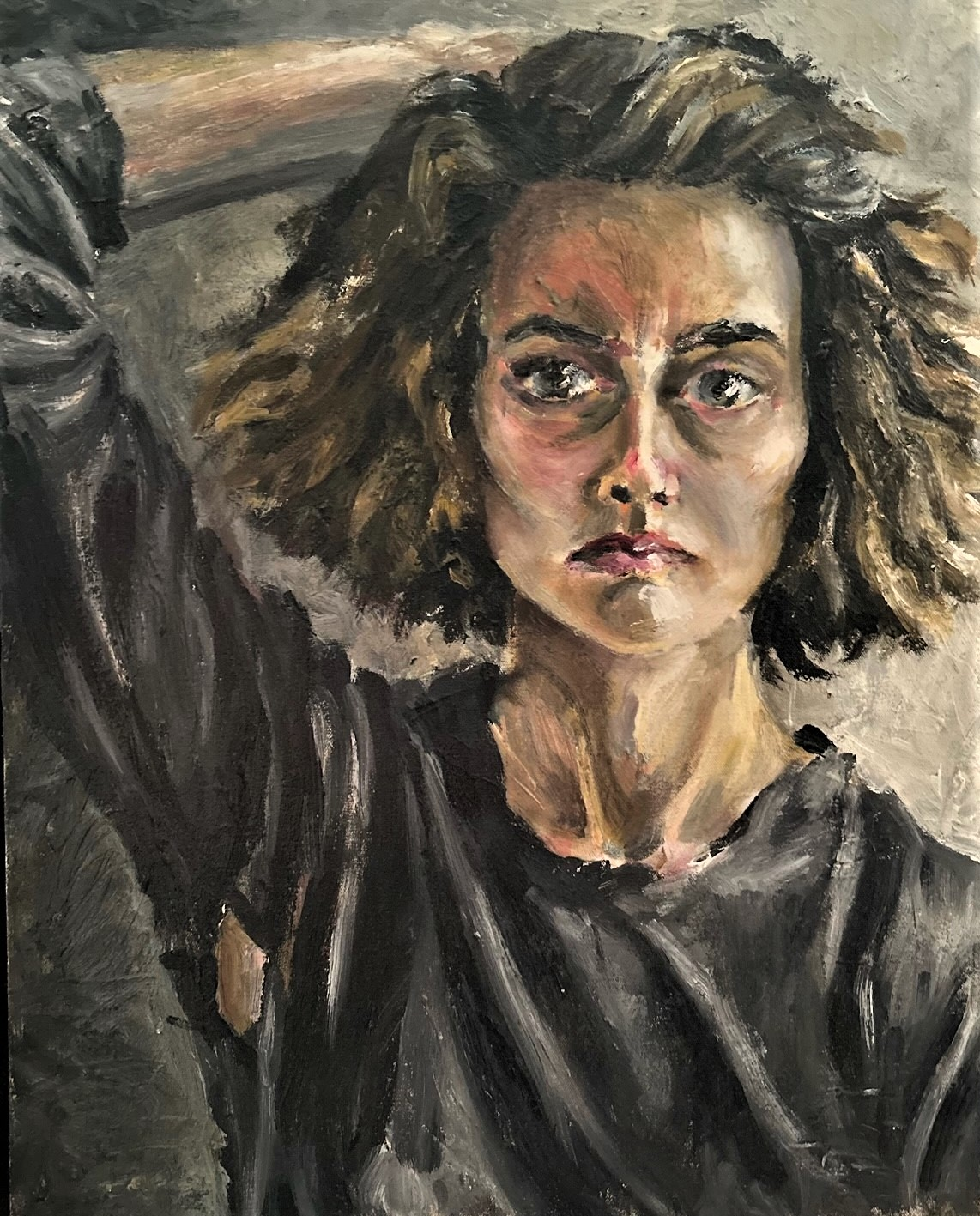
Maree Menzel self portrait

Maree Therese Menzel (1949–2004) was an Australian artist and costume designer known for her innovative and creative designs for theatre, fashion and interiors. Her work spanned pastel, oils, fabric and textiles.

== Early life and education ==
Maree Menzel was born on 9 November 1949 in Dimboola, Victoria, Australia. She developed an interest in design and modelling from a young age and commenced a Diploma of Art and Design at Prahran Technical School in 1967. After her first year Maree was awarded a Commonwealth Advanced Education Scholarship, based ‘on results obtained in first-year examinations’. During her time at Prahran, she was mentored by Rowena Clark, a distinguished designer and educator. In 1983-5 Menzel studied a Bachelor of Fine Arts at the Victorian College of the Arts, focusing on printmaking.

== Career ==
From 1972, Menzel was both modelling and writing for the first Australian pop music newspaper Go-Set. Her titles included ‘A guide to tarting your face on the cheap’, ‘Happy hats’, and ‘Excessoreyesing’.

=== Theatre ===
In the late 1970s, Menzel designed for the Melbourne Theatre Company including touring productions:

- 14 June 1977 The Wild Duck, Athenaeum Theatre Melbourne
- 24 January 1978 Dusa, Fish, Stas and Vi, Russell St Theatre Melbourne
- 10 March 1978 Dusa, Fish, Stas and Vi, The Playhouse Theatre Perth WA
- 26 April 1978 Dusa, Fish, Stas and Vi, Union Hall Adelaide SA
- 23 May 1978 Departmental, Russell St Theatre Melbourne
- 1 June 1978 Dusa, Fish, Stas and Vi, Theatre Royal Sydney
- 12 Dec 1978 Arsenic and Old Lace, Athenaeum Theatre Melbourne
- 8 February 1984 The Real Thing Athenaeum Theatre Melbourne

At the age of 28, Menzel was described as the ‘brilliant young Maree Menzel’, joining Kenneth Rowell to form a duo of designers for The Victoria Opera.

Menzel also designed costumes and sets for

- 10 September 1982 Void: In search of a dream St Martins South Yarra Vic
- 20 March 1992 Mistress Antill Theatre South Melbourne Vic
- 18 May 1994 Blithe Spirit Carmelite Hall Middle Park Vic
- 25 November 1994 Steel Magnolias Carmelite Hall Middle Park Vic
- 24 November 1995 Wildest Dreams Carmelite Hall Middle Park Vic

=== Fashion ===
Menzel’s career as a fashion designer took off in the 1980s when she began working with Prue Acton, a prominent Australian fashion designer. As principal designer for Acton’s Melbourne Cup outfits, Menzel showcased Australian fashion on a world stage. Her designs included the Titanium outfit (1983), Mock Croc (1986), and an embroidered navy linen suit for Derby Day 1987. Menzel also designed Fantasy Head, a mask for a charity auction at the Metro Nightclub in the late 1980s, using green and gold fabric scraps to evoke sea and bush themes. Snake Proof, a costume designed by Menzel and Marcos Davidson, was part of Australian Fashion: The Contemporary Art, an exhibition at the Powerhouse in Sydney and London's V&A Museum in 1989-1990.

=== Interiors ===
Menzel's eye for colour and sense of humour led to several interior designs and window dressing commissions. Her Port Melbourne home, with a deep orange Moroccan-inspired lounge room and hand painted mandala ceiling rose, is featured in Places, a photographic book by Earl Carter and Jean Wright.

== Legacy ==
Menzel’s work continues to be appreciated for its artistic value and innovative approach to costume design. Her designs are preserved in collections such as Museums Victoria.

== Awards ==
- 2004 Victoria Law Foundation Best Illustration Award

== Personal life ==
Menzel married jewellery designer and musician Marcos Davidson in a colourful ceremony in 1989. They divorced in the 1990s. After many years with cancer, Menzel died on 27 December 2004, and is buried at Dimboola Cemetery.
