= Rat Parties =

Series of Australian dance parties in the 1980s and 1990s

RAT Parties
- Genre: Electronic music, fashion, art, lifestyle
- Location: Sydney, Australia
- Years active: 1983-1992
- Founders: Recreational Arts Team

RAT Parties were a series of large dance parties held in Sydney, Australia during the 1980s and early 1990s. The Powerhouse Museum said that they "formed a key element of an emerging subculture" that was fashion-aware, gay-friendly, appreciated dance music and open, outrageous celebration. Along with the rise of the Sydney Gay and Lesbian Mardi Gras, the success of RAT Parties marked a groundswell of acceptance of Sydney's gay & lesbian community. RAT parties are credited with introducing the visual performance art of VJing to Australia.

== RAT Team ==
Forty Rat Parties were organised by the Recreational Arts Team between 1983 and 1992. The core of the team was Jac Vidgen, Billy Yip and Reno Dal. Jac Vidgen was a gregarious organiser who became the promoter and business leader. Billy Yip was a creative artist who created the themes and design concepts which characterized the parties, and his cleverly co-ordinated posters, fliers and ads became noticed around Sydney. Reno Dal was the team's original technical designer and producer involved from 1983 until 1986. Mark Taylor was the technical producer for the peak period 1986–1990, Wayne Gait-Smith was a technical designer. Tim and Mic Gruchy were the video designers from 1987 to 1992. As a young fashion student and a close friend of Vidgen, Akira Isogawa contributed to many of the lavish costumes that now survive in a well catalogued retrospective of the RAT era kept at Sydney's Powerhouse Museum.

Vidgen was working as a waiter, holding extravagant parties for his friends in houses he shared until Dal, who had supplied the lighting for one of those parties, suggested they cover the costs by charging people. Vidgen and his boyfriend Yip agreed, and they set about organizing the first RAT party.

== Growth of the concept ==
Doge Vidgen threw his first public party (entitled "RAT Rock Wreck") for 200-250 guests in inner-city Surry Hills on 2 October 1983. Subsequent parties each had a special name, usually conceived by Billy Yip, incorporating the word 'rat' in its title. The next official RAT party, titled 'RATsurrect' and advertised through word-of-mouth, was held at the Bondi Pavilion on 22 April 1984. The early parties, particularly 'RATizm' at the Paddington Town Hall April 1985 attracted an inner-city party crowd of heterosexual bohemians as well as gay men and drag queens. RAT parties typically had audio-visual presentations, bizarre props, party drugs, innovative lighting, underground cabaret groups, the best DJs in town and unusual live performances. The later large Sydney Showground events would feature amusements and rides, break out/chill out areas and a selection of food and beverage alternatives.

In 1987 Vidgen registered Recreational Arts Team Pty Ltd as a company. The events became larger, and were no longer exclusive eastern suburbs affairs where it was necessary to know the right people to obtain a ticket. The parties became famous for their spectacular entertainment and celebrity guests. Massive New Year's Eve parties were held for four consecutive years filing the Hordern Pavilion and Royal Hall of Industries at Sydney's Showground where up to 15,000 partygoers could be accommodated. 'A Ratty New Year', was the first held on New Year's Eve 1988 the event was broadcast live on JJJ and featured a 4am live performance by Grace Jones. Jones was due on stage much closer to midnight but refused to perform until Vidgen could provide a paper-trail of evidence that the performance fee had been transferred into her US account. New Year's Eve 1989 headlined Adeva at the same venue.

Magazines and newspapers regularly featured RAT Parties in their social pages - fashions worn by partygoers and performers were captured by a number of high-profile photographers, among them Robert Rosen, Tom Stack, John Webber, Sonny Vandevelde and most notably William Yang. The Australian Broadcasting Corporation summed up the events by saying "Parties became an art form in Sydney's Oxford street. Jack Vidgen's private house parties grew into the notorious RAT parties. Events that set the tone and style of Australian dance music culture." Media responses to the novelty of these events was mixed. At one time, the Herald said that "RAT parties are a concept that has obviously worked", while another article in the same newspaper described them as "resolutely and profoundly superficial" with "unapologetic selfishness ... and shabby glitter."

The RAT events gradually became a part of mainstream Sydney culture; the parties were praised for their record of non-violence and the RAT team was sponsored by the New South Wales Government to produce the "young people's event" for their 1987 Carnivale. Starting with the party on New Year's Eve 1986, some RAT parties were brought under the organization umbrella of the Festival of Sydney, produced in partnership with ABC Radio's JJJ, which broadcast the events live featuring well-known radio personalities including Andy Glittre and Maynard F# Crabbes.

Although the budgets had grown from $5,000 to $400,000, costs and expectations also skyrocketed. Business was risky, profits were slim, and money made on one party was frequently lost on the next one.

== DJs and copycats ==
The RAT parties and Sydney Gay Mardi Gras Party and Sleazeball were forerunners of the dance parties and raves of the late 1980s and early 1990s. In the early 1980s pub rock in Sydney was still the mainstream, and dance music was a relatively underground phenomenon, with venues such as Stranded and later Patchs in Sydney pioneering dance parties in established venues. Dance party enthusiasts left the pub scene behind, preferring recorded electronic music provided by pioneering DJs like Tim Ritchie, Robert Racic, Stephen Allkins, Bill Morley, Pee Wee Ferris, Scott Pullen, Andy Glitre and Mark Alsop.

Spearheaded by these DJs, dance music took off in Sydney during the 1980s. Promoters behind events by FUN, Sweatbox, Bacchanalia and the standard setting twice yearly public parties produced by the Sydney Gay and Lesbian Mardi Gras, booked inner city warehouses and tired old venues and transformed them into vibrant, packed palaces. By the end of the 1980s parties flourished all around the country, with promoters booking a constant flow of influential overseas DJs such as Paul Oakenfold. While established rock venues suffered from lack of attendance, dance parties were frequently sold out.

By the end of the 1980s it seemed that a massive dance party was being held every weekend at an accessible Sydney venue and competition was fierce. The RAT team limited their efforts to a single New Year's event each year.

== Cultural impact and legacy ==
The RAT parties altered Sydney's nightlife, starting a craze for giant dance parties that lasted into the 1990s. They provided a diverse range of entertainment based on visual and aural stimulation, served as a creative outlet for talented individuals, and set the tone and style of Australian dance music culture. RAT parties are credited with introducing the visual performance art of VJing to Australia.

A timeline documenting the impact of Sydney’s rave scene from 1989 to 1998, including major events like RATs iconic NYE 1987 party, is available on the Sydney Rave History website. The site also features an interview with RAT party founder Jac Vidgen, discussing the movement’s cultural legacy.

In 2009, the Sydney Powerhouse Museum hosted an exhibition to "revive memories of Sydney's notorious RAT parties". Vidgen donated many of the articles on display there, and he described in an interview how the creative freedom and interactions from the RAT days built the careers of a number of people in various creative fields.

== See also ==
- List of electronic music festivals
- Sydney Gay and Lesbian Mardi Gras
- Rave
