= Saul Eslake =

Australian economist

- Occupations: Economist commentator public speaker Corinna Economic Advisory; Vice Chancellor's Fellow of the University of Tasmania

Academic background
- Education: University of Tasmania; Securities Institute of Australia; Columbia Business School; Australian Institute of Company Directors

Academic work
- Notable works: Coronavirus Impact Chart Pack
- Website: www.sauleslake.com

Saul Eslake is an Australian economist, commentator, and public speaker. He is the principal of Corinna Economic Advisory, and previously was the Chief Economist at the Australia & New Zealand Banking Group between 1995 and 2009, and the Chief Economist for Bank of America Merrill Lynch (Australia and New Zealand) between 2011 and 2015. He has been a Vice Chancellor's Fellow at the University of Tasmania since 2016.

== Early life and education ==
Eslake was born in England and adopted by Australian parents. After moving to Tasmania at age 8 with his family, Eslake attended school in Smithton and Hobart. Eslake completed a first class honours degree in Economics from the University of Tasmania and a Post Graduate Diploma in Applied Finance and Investment from the Securities Institute of Australia (now known as FINSIA). He has completed the Senior Executive Program at the Columbia University Graduate School of Business, and (with Merit) the Company Directors’ Course of the Australian Institute of Company Directors.

Eslake was Vice President (1980–81) and later President (1981–82) of the Young Liberal Movement of Australia. In a 1982 address, Prime Minister Malcolm Fraser said that he had “valued the close consultation” he had with Eslake and other Young Liberal figures during this period.

== Career ==
Eslake began his career as an economist in Fiscal and Monetary Policy sections of the Australian Treasury in Canberra. Eslake then worked for the Advisory Council for Inter-Government Relations (specializing in federal-state financial relations and in housing policy) and for the Opposition (Minority) Leader in the State Parliament of Victoria.

Eslake then worked as a chief economist in the financial markets, including as Chief Economist at McIntosh Securities in the late 1980s, Chief Economist (International) for the investment management division of National Mutual in the early 1990s, Chief Economist at the Australia & New Zealand Banking Group between 1995 and 2009, and the Chief Economist (Australia and New Zealand) for Bank of America Merrill Lynch between 2011 and 2015.

He has been the Australian representative on the International Conference of Commercial Bank Economists (ICCBE) since 2003, and chaired its Steering Committee between 2018 and 2021.

Eslake has been a Vice Chancellor's Fellow of the University of Tasmania since April 2016.

In 2009 Eslake founded Corinna Economic Advisory, an economics consulting business based in Hobart. In 2021 Corinna Economic Advisory joined with a similar London-based economics consultancy, Llewellyn Consulting, to form Independent Economics.

Eslake is a member of the Australian Parliamentary Budget Office's panel of expert advisors, and a member of Australian Taxation Office’s ‘Tax Gap’ expert advisory panel. He has previously served on a variety of government advisory councils. Eslake has also previously been Chair of the Tasmanian Arts Advisory Board, which advised on the distribution of grants to arts companies and individual artists. He has also been a non-executive director of the Gas and Fuel Corporation of Victoria; the Australian Housing and Urban Research Institute, Hydro Tasmania, Housing Choices Australia, and Macquarie Point Development Corporation.

=== Economic analysis and reports ===
Eslake has written reports commissioned by private and public organisations as well as government institutions on topics such as sovereign risk, housing affordability and home ownership, taxation reform, shipping costs, international student education, the Tasmanian economy, productivity, the labour market, and various aspects of macro-economic policy.

In April 2020 Eslake began producing a weekly Coronavirus Impact Chart Pack about the impact of the COVID-19 pandemic and government responses on the Australian economy, the world economy, and on major individual economies. It has been referred to by the Parliament of Australia.

Eslake has been a vocal critic of the 2018 GST reform, arguing it was done purely for political purposes and is unjustifiably expensive. The West Australian newspaper labelled him the "GST whinger-in-chief".

=== Public speaker ===
Eslake speaks at public and private conferences. He participates in panel discussions; presents to boards, investment and asset allocation committees; undertakes customized analyses and reports for corporate, investor, not-for-profit and government clients; has given testimony to Parliamentary Committees; and appears frequently on radio and TV and in the print media in Australia and other countries, including appearance on Conversations with Richard Fidler on ABC.

Through his monthly webinars, Eslake shares his view on topics such as Assessments of Australian federal budget, Australian New Protectionism, quantitative easing, Modern Monetary fiscal policy and government debt.

== Print and online media ==
Over the years Eslake has contributed writing to various Australian and international print and online media. His article entitled ‘The best way to push bad policy is to wrap it up in a ‘security’ blanket’, originally published in The Age and the Sydney Morning Herald, 9 November 2011 was featured in The Best Australian Business Writing 2012.

== Honours and awards ==
- 2002 University of Tasmania Foundation Graduate Award
- 2012 Honorary Doctor of Laws degree by the University of Tasmania
- His website was selected for preservation by the National Library of Australia's Trove in 2016
