= Mark Alsop =

Australian DJ and remixer

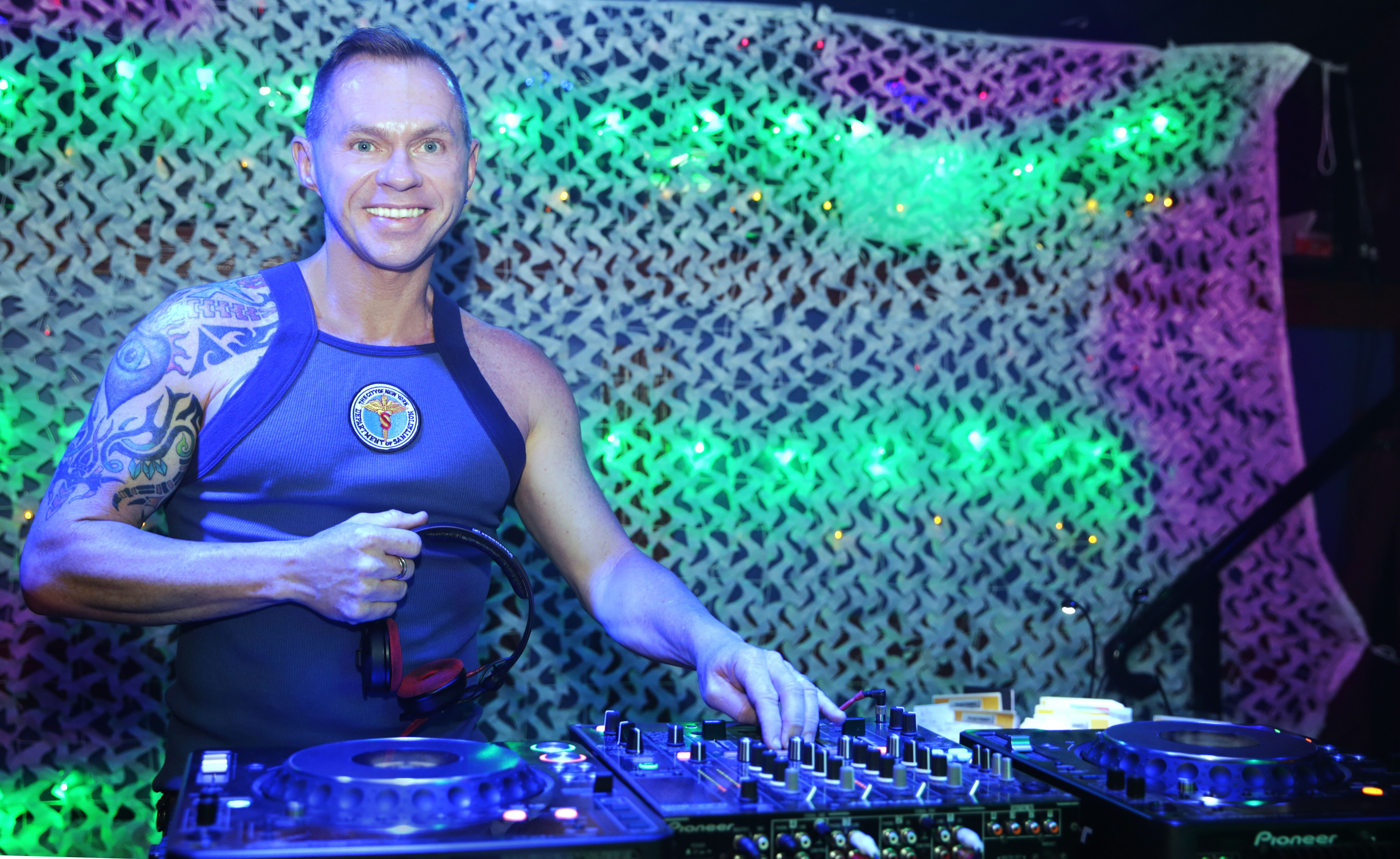
- 2014 in Sydney
- Born: 1963 (age 62–63); Adelaide
- Occupation: DJ
- Years active: 1984–present
- Awards: ACON Media, Arts and Entertainment Award
- Website: www.markalsop.com

Mark Alsop is an Australian DJ and remixer. Alsop is one of the longest-continuous working DJs in Australia. He predominantly plays house music and tends to play at gay dance parties, bars and clubs. Specific genres played include electro house, progressive house, deep house, and vocal house as well as retro and soulful house tunes.

Mark moved to Sydney when he was 19. In 1991, he studied sound engineering at the Australian Film, Television and Radio School. He has provided his voluntary services to charitable events, particularly those that seek to provide education and support in relation to HIV/AIDS. In 2011, his charitable work was recognised when he received an ACON award. In 2016, Mark played a set at the Sydney Gay and Lesbian Mardi Gras party.

== Career ==
Alsop's early career plans focused on hospitality. His DJing began in 1984. The move was prompted by a meeting with David Hiscock. His first regular work was at a bar called Club 45 on Oxford Street in Sydney. This was followed by work at Midnight Shift. He has played at numerous events in Sydney, Brisbane and around their respected states as well as Melbourne, Adelaide and overseas at Noumea, Kuala Lumpur, Phuket and Wellington. His popularity grew as the dance party scene in Sydney expanded in the late 1980s, particularly at the Sweatbox parties. In 1989, he played at Sleaze, Rat Parties, Bachanalia parties, Zoo parties and all of the Paradise Garage parties. Alsop has also played at numerous charity functions and benefits.

In the mid-1990s he concentrated on remixing work and took a break from DJing while living on the Sunshine Coast. In 1998, Alsop played at the Brisbane Pride Festival dance party. Around this time he regularly played at the Wickham Hotel in Fortitude Valley and the Brisbane-based Sleaze parties organised by SkyPak Lighting. Alsop played at the Brisbane's Big Gay Day in 2008. In 2009, he played on the "Surry Hillsong" float in the Sydney Mardi Gras. In 2012 and 2014, he appeared on the cover of SX News magazine.

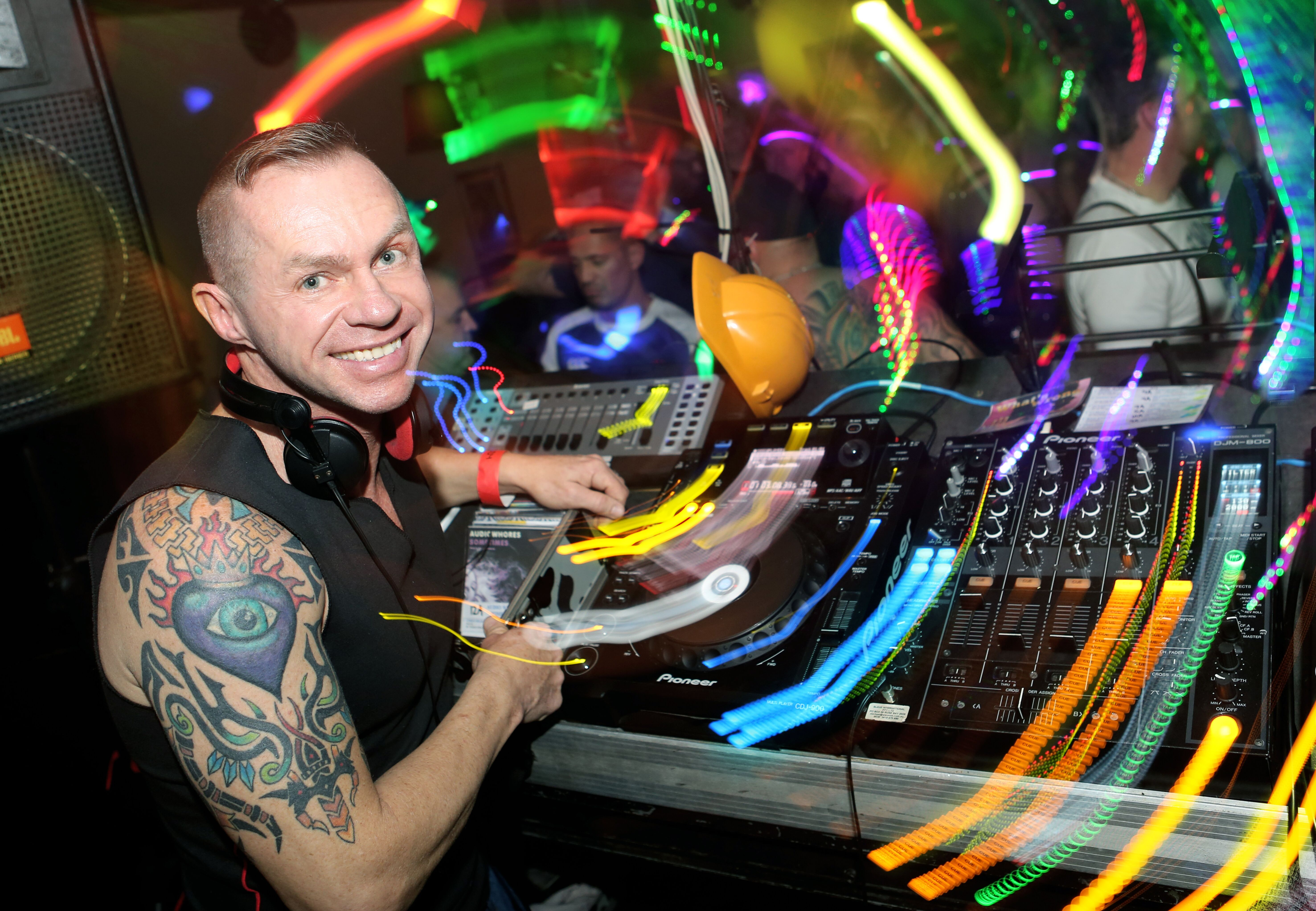
Djing at a hotel in 2012

His remixing work began in 1991. He has worked with Paul Goodyear and has remixed tracks for Janet Jackson, M People, The Human League and Peter Blakely. He has worked on remixes for both international and Australian labels including Hot Tracks, Disco Tech, Rhythm Stick, ACE and X Mix.

As a regular of the Sydney nightclub scene he was featured in an investigative report into the identity of Trough Man. Alsop was interviewed for the book Music Wars – The Sound of the Underground which tells the story of Central Station Records. He featured in the 2018 book 'Telling Tales' – 40 Fabulous Years of Floats, Fun, Fantasy and Fortitude (of the Sydney Gay and Lesbian Mardi Gras).

== Awards ==
In 2011, Alsop won the Media, Arts and Entertainment award for his service to the community at the ACON Honour Awards. He has also won several Best DJ Awards from the Sydney Star Observer.

== See also ==
- List of club DJs
