= John Spender =

Australian politician (1935–2022)

John Spender KC
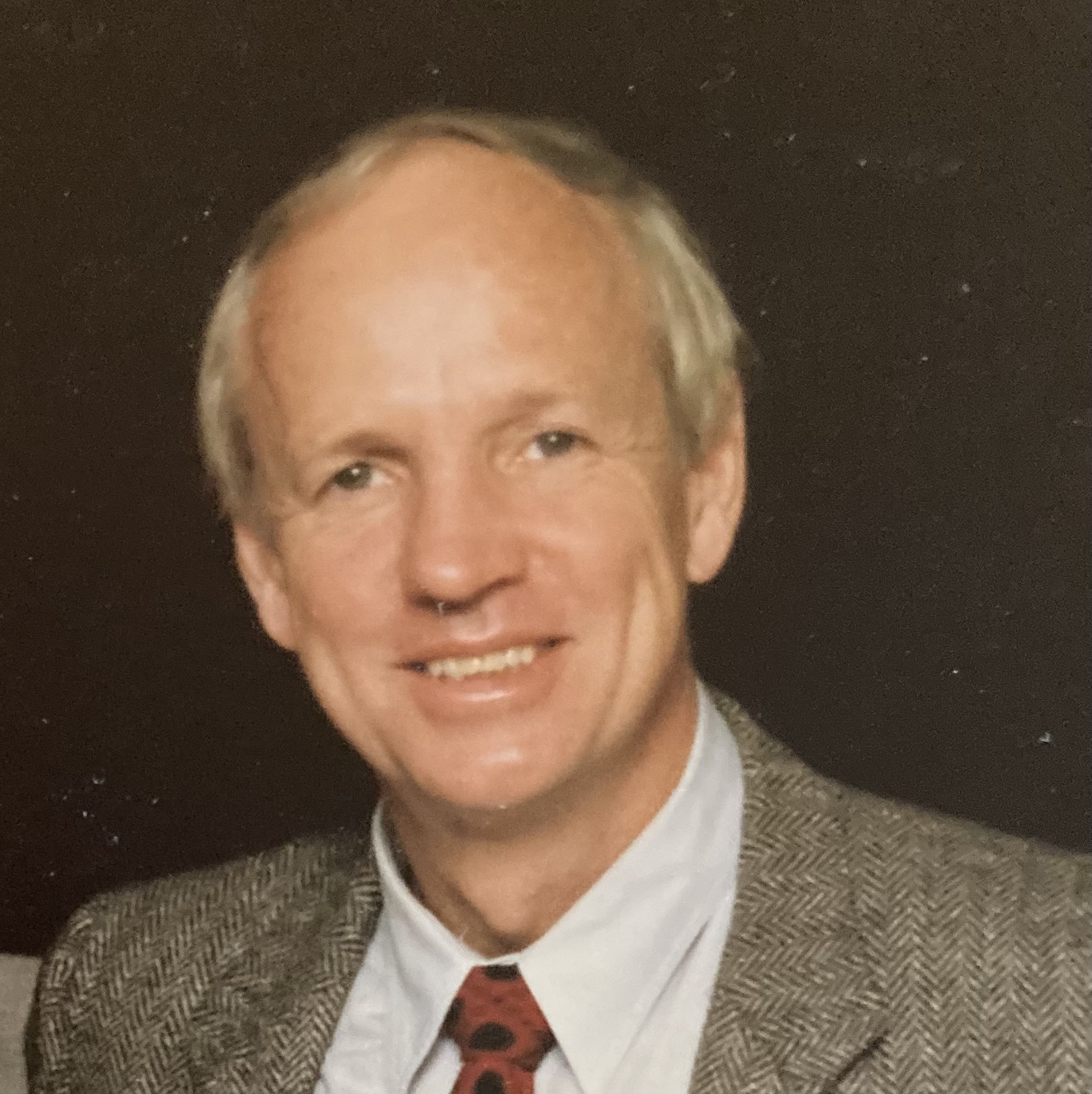
- Spender circa 1988

Manager of Opposition Business
- In office 29 April 1987 – 14 August 1987
- Leader: John Howard
- Preceded by: Ian Sinclair
- Succeeded by: Wal Fife

Member of the Australian Parliament for North Sydney
- In office 18 October 1980 – 24 March 1990
- Preceded by: Bill Graham
- Succeeded by: Ted Mack

Personal details
- Born: 2 December 1935 Sydney, New South Wales, Australia
- Died: 13 October 2022 (aged 86) Sydney, New South Wales, Australia
- Party: Liberal
- Spouse(s): Carla Zampatti (m. 1975–2010); Catherine Spender
- Children: Bianca Spender; Allegra Spender
- Parent(s): Percy Spender; Jean Spender
- Education: Yale University
- Profession: Barrister

John Michael Spender KC (2 December 1935 – 13 October 2022) was an Australian politician, diplomat and barrister. He was a member of the House of Representatives from 1980 to 1990, representing the Liberal Party, and was a shadow minister under Andrew Peacock and John Howard. He later served as Ambassador to France from 1996 to 2000.

== Early life ==
Spender was born in Sydney on 2 December 1935. He was the son of Jean (née Henderson) and Percy Spender. His mother was a novelist and his father was a politician, diplomat and judge who served as Ambassador to the United States in the 1950s.

Spender was educated at Cranbrook School, Sydney, Yale University and Gray's Inn. He returned to Australia and practised as a barrister in Sydney from 1961 to 1980. He was appointed Queen's Counsel (QC) in 1974. In 1978, he represented the Shop, Distributive and Allied Employees Association (SDA) in a lawsuit against the Australian Workers' Union (AWU).

Spender was commissioned by the Government of New South Wales to report on the collapse of Gollin Holdings Limited. He found that the company's managing director Keith Gale had falsified accounts to cover a $10.8 million loss in 1975, and had also misappropriated company funds. His final report was tabled in state parliament in March 1979, and recommended changes to company laws and practices.

== Politics ==
Spender served as treasurer and metropolitan vice-president of the Liberal Party of Australia (New South Wales Division). In 1979, he and state president David Patten conducted an inquiry into Lyenko Urbanchich, a Liberal Party official who had been accused of collaboration with the Nazis in war-time Slovenia. They found no clear evidence to verify the allegations but recommended he be barred from holding party office with the permission of the state executive. However, the state executive subsequently voted that Urbanchich be expelled from the party.

Spender unsuccessfully sought Liberal preselection at the 1969 federal election (in Warringah) and the 1973 Parramatta by-election. He was eventually elected to the House of Representatives at the 1980 federal election, succeeding Bill Graham in North Sydney. After the Coalition's defeat in 1983, he was appointed to Andrew Peacock's shadow ministry with responsibility for aviation and defence support. He was later removed for opposing the Costigan Commission.

Following the 1985 leadership spill, the new opposition leader John Howard appointed Spender as shadow attorney-general. In June 1986, he strongly criticised proposals for a bill of rights. In April 1987, he succeeded Peter Baume as the Coalition's spokesman on the status of women, in the absence of any women in the shadow ministry. After the 1987 federal election Spender was given the foreign affairs portfolio. In August 1988, he called for all Australian sanctions against South Africa to be removed, stating they had slowed reform.

Spender held the seat until his defeat by prominent independent Ted Mack at the 1990 election. He lost over 18 percent of his primary vote from 1987, allowing Mack to win when Democrat and Labor preferences flowed overwhelmingly to him.

== Ambassador ==
In 1996, Spender was appointed Australian Ambassador to France, a position he held until 2000. He was also non-resident ambassador to Portugal (1996–1998) and special envoy to Cyprus (1996–2000). He was awarded a Legion D'honneur by the French government for the work he did to build French and Australian relations.

== Personal life and death ==
Spender married fashion designer Carla Zampatti in 1975 and they had two children: Bianca and Allegra. Zampatti publicly announced the end of the marriage at an event at her home in April 2010. He then married Catherine Spender.

Bianca Spender is a fashion designer. Allegra Spender was elected to the House of Representatives at the 2022 federal election, standing as a teal independent against an incumbent Liberal MP. Her father publicly endorsed her candidacy.

Spender died in Sydney on 13 October 2022, at the age of 86.

Parliament of Australia
Preceded by Bill Graham	Member for North Sydney; 1980–1990	Succeeded by Ted Mack
Diplomatic posts
Preceded by Alan Brown	Australian Ambassador to France; 1996–2000	Succeeded by William Fisher
Preceded by Alan Brown	Australian Ambassador to Portugal; 1996–1998	Succeeded by Janet Gardiner
