= GST distribution dispute =

Political controversy over tax revenue in Australia

The GST distribution dispute is an ongoing political controversy concerning the distribution of goods and services tax (GST) revenue amongst the Australian states and territories and the federal government. The dispute was originally based upon Western Australia's (WA's) dissatisfaction with its low returns, which led to reform in 2018. The 2018 reform guarantees all states and territories a minimum share of GST revenue.

As a result of WA's improved financial position during and after the COVID-19 pandemic, debate has since centred around the suitability of the minimum payments floor introduced and the perceived inequity of the reform. Currently, the federal government provides a no worse-off guarantee, meaning that states and territories receive either the funding they would have under the old system or the new system, whichever is higher. This prevents the reform causing disadvantage to any jurisdiction during the transition period, which will expire in 2029–30. Several states have held inquiries and have alternatively demanded the federal government undo the reform or continue contributing to the GST pool. The Commonwealth Grants Commission, which is responsible for calculating the GST shares paid to each state and territory, is scheduled to review the GST scheme twice by 2027.

Critics have pointed to the high cost the federal government incurs subsidising states under the no worse-off guarantee and the relative inequity in funding that the reform introduced. Alternative proposals have suggested using a per capita distribution system. Supporters of the reform contest that WA cannot be expected to indefinitely subsidise other states, that undoing the reform would disincentivise WA from developing its natural resources, and that gambling taxes (which are a major source of revenue in the eastern states) should be included in the distribution calculation just as mining royalties are. The reforms continue to be supported by both the Coalition and the Labor Party at a federal level, and both have campaigned on their support for the reform. Despite the criticism and proposed alternatives, it is generally understood that altering the distribution arrangements would be political suicide due to WA's status as a key swing state in federal elections.

== Background ==
The GST system was originally legislated by the Howard government (Coalition) in 1999 and introduced in 2000. It is a value-added tax set at 10% of the price of most goods and services sold in the country. Upon its introduction, it replaced several state taxes as part of a broader taxation reform.

In Australia, GST revenue is paid to a central pool and then distributed between the states and territories according to the principle of horizontal fiscal equalisation (HFE). The HFE system is designed to equalise revenue between the states and remedy fiscal imbalance. Recommendations for the share of GST revenue for each state and territory are made by the Commonwealth Grants Commission (CGC), originally with the goal of providing equal quality government services between all states.

== Origins ==
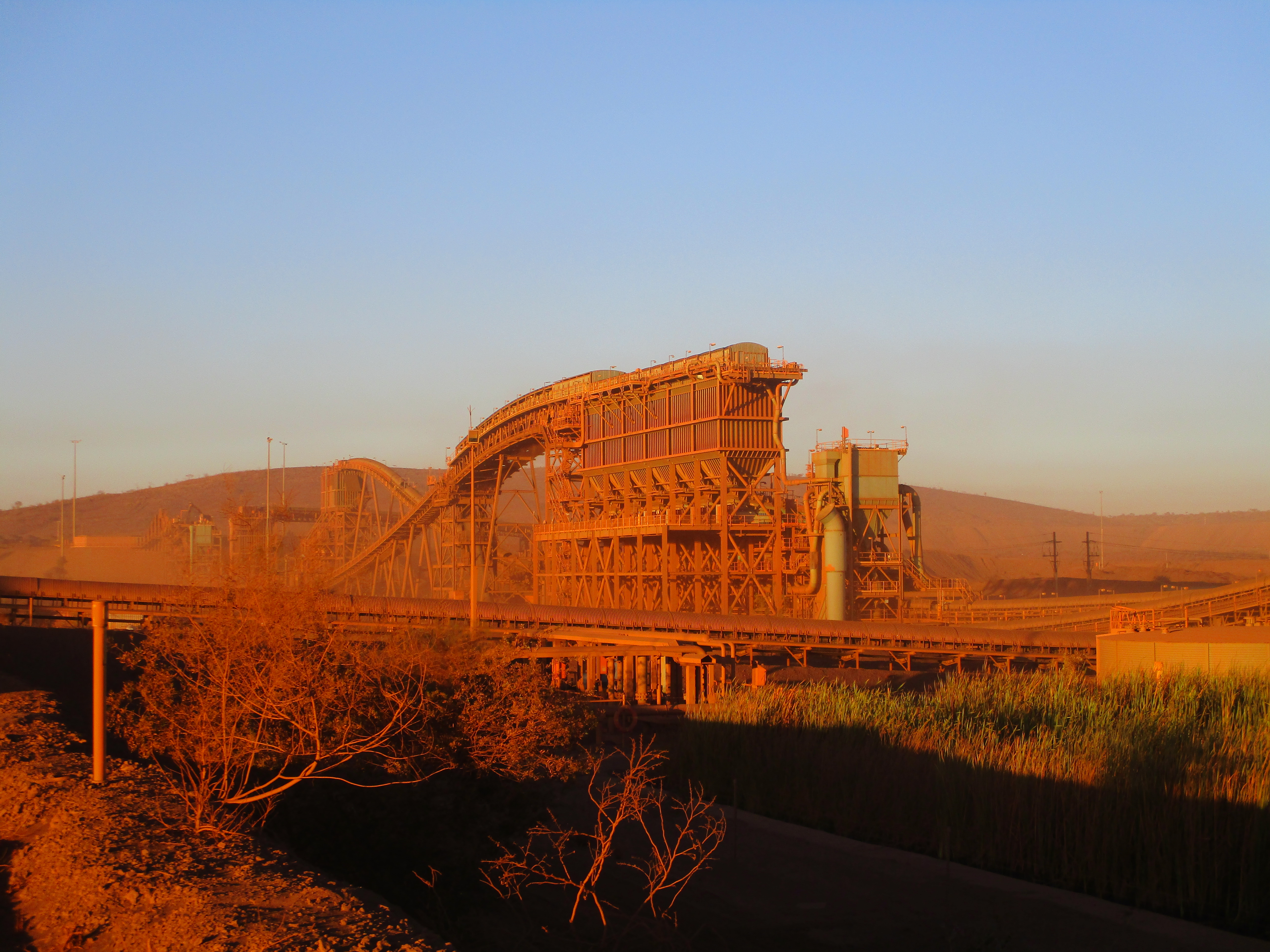
Western Australia earns much of its revenue from resource royalties, which affected its GST share.

WA's budget is supported in large part by resource royalties. The GST share received by WA was relatively steady from 2000 to the mid-2000s, taking its first plunge as the iron ore and gas boom began and resource tax revenue rose dramatically. To account for the rise in resource royalties revenue, the CGC began to reduce WA's GST share and increase the share of other states and territories. It was during this time that the state's criticism of HFE first began. By 2010, the share was around 70 per cent of its population share, and this continued to decline until the reforms were imposed.

WA ran in deficit for much of the 2010s, and Liberal Premier Colin Barnett consistently blamed these deficits on a lack of GST revenue, particularly given the state's GST share fell at the same time as iron ore royalties. This was due to the "lag" in the HFE system, since the CGC included royalty revenues in their calculations based on three-years of past data. For example, in 2014–15 GST relativities were calculated based on past royalties when the iron ore price was US$118 per tonne, when the current price was US$37.70. The state had accumulated debt of around A$30 billion by the financial year 2016–17, equivalent to A$34.4 billion in 2022. That year, the state ran a budget deficit of A$3.9 billion. In 2016–17, A$4 billion of WA's GST revenue had been distributed to other states. The Liberal Prime Minister Malcolm Turnbull subsequently committed to implementing a GST floor to ensure a minimum GST share for all states and territories, but said it would not be implemented until WA's share had risen to around 75 per cent of its population share under the HFE system, which was not projected to occur for at least another four years. The commitment was heavily criticised by the state Labor opposition, who argued that federal government had given no timeline for change. Barnett later wrote that the federal Coalition's indecisiveness during 2016 and ahead of the 2017 state election had left him "the proverbial shag on the rock."

== Change in state government ==
GST return by state (FY2017–18)
State/territory	Relativities (2017–18) (Note: Dollars received per dollar paid, per person in a state or territory.)
Western Australia	0.34434
Australian Capital Territory	1.19496
New South Wales	0.87672
Northern Territory	4.66024
Queensland	1.18769
South Australia	1.43997
Tasmania	1.80477
(Victoria (state)) Victoria	0.93239

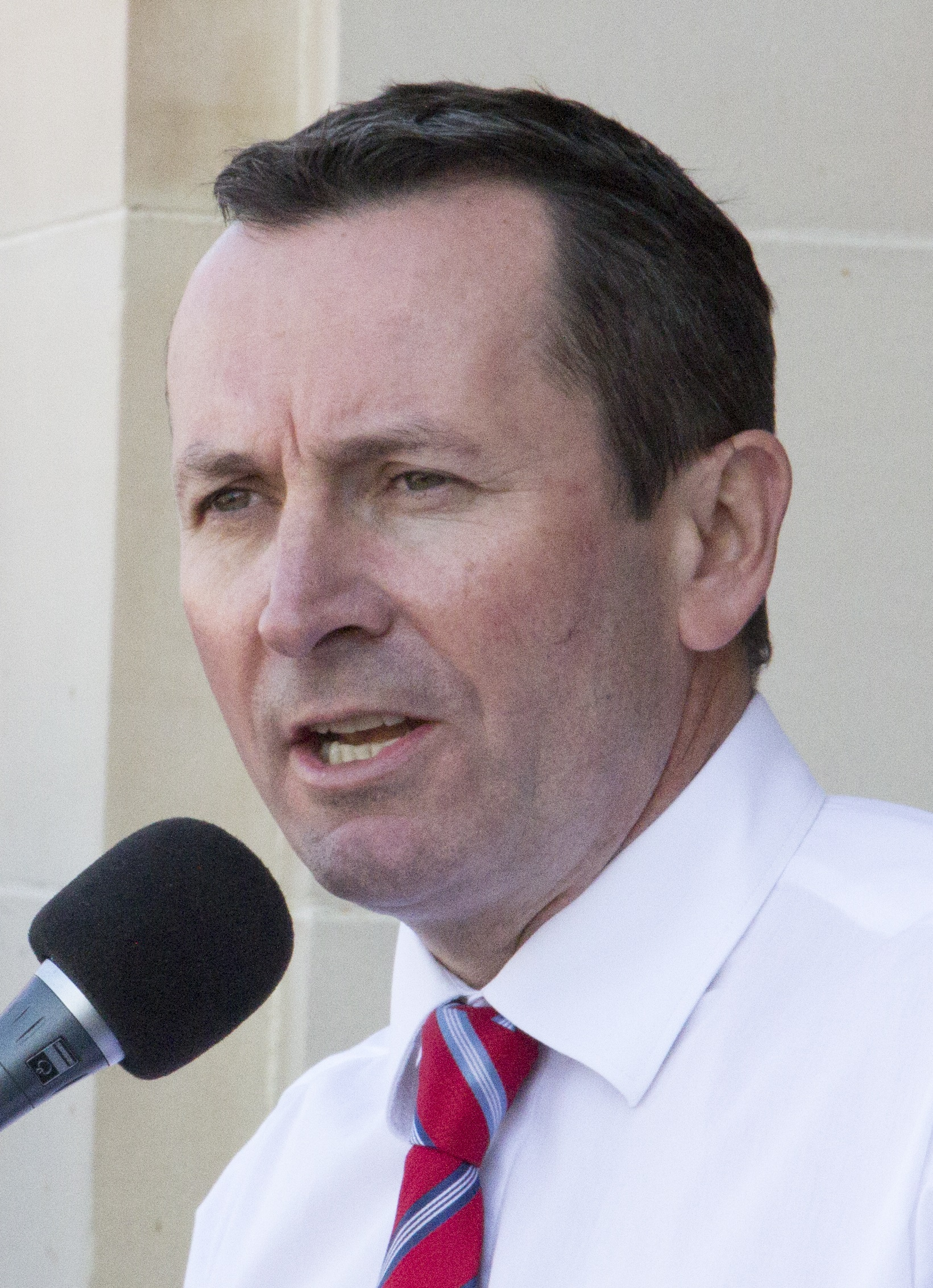
As premier of WA, Mark McGowan advocated for a new GST formula to improve the state's share.

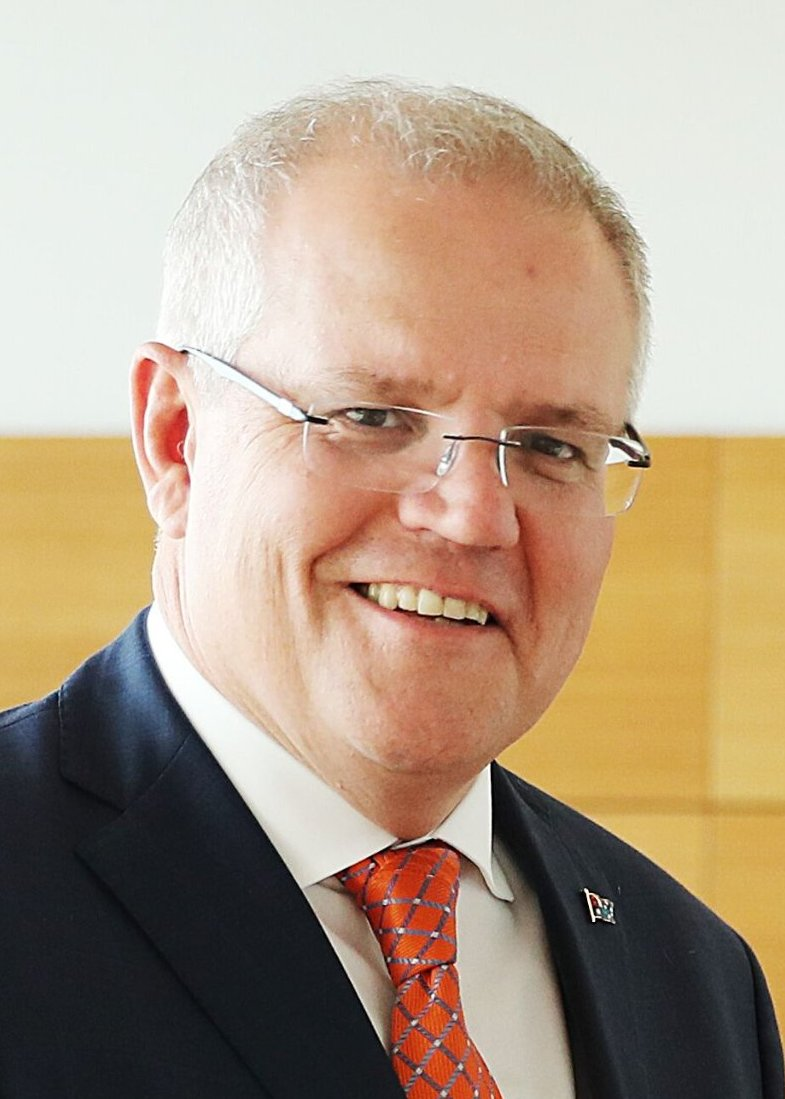
Scott Morrison served as treasurer during the design of the new model and directed both Productivity Commission reports.

By 2017 the existing system had resulted in a situation in which WA was paid approximately 34 per cent of its population share of the GST pool. The next lowest share was received by New South Wales (NSW), who received approximately 88 per cent of its population share, with the highest share being the approximately 466 per cent paid to the Northern Territory.

The newly elected McGowan Labor government in WA had been relying upon a GST payment of 38 per cent of its population share to help return the state budget to surplus by 2019–20 financial year. Although 34 per cent was an improvement on the 2016–17 rate of approximately 30 per cent, the reduction left the state with $241 million less than expected for the 2017–18 state budget. State treasurer Ben Wyatt called the situation a "joke" and requested a top-up payment of $226 million, claiming the state was "in the fourth year of what is effectively a domestic recession". Members of the federal Liberal government weighed in, with treasurer Scott Morrison stating he would consider the request for additional payments, while senator Dean Smith labelled HFE "terminally diseased".

However, Turnbull again stated that no floor would be introduced until WA's share had been raised to between 70 and 75 per cent of its population share under the HFE system, which was not projected to occur for at least four years. He added that no change could occur without the agreement of other states and territories, which WA Premier Mark McGowan asserted was false given the CGC was a federal body. One Nation senator Pauline Hanson said she would support a reduction in Queensland's payments to improve WA's share, but backtracked when asked to clarify her comments by the Queensland state government.

The WA Opposition Leader Mike Nahan, a Liberal, went as far as to suggest that his party would sue the federal government in the High Court. He stressed that WA "want no more taxation, but fair distribution of existing revenue raised." However, state Attorney-General John Quigley rejected the idea, stating that he had already received legal advice which ruled out that possibility.

The GST distribution was expected to become a political issue for the upcoming federal election, which was due to be held in 2019.

A review of the HFE system by the Productivity Commission was requested by Morrison in April 2017. A draft copy of the report was released in October, recommending that WA's share rise by $3.2–3.6 billion at the expense of all other state and territory shares. This provoked a vigorous reaction from South Australian Premier Steven Marshall, a Liberal, who said the state would not support any change that would reduce its share.

Morrison directed the Productivity Commission to undertake a second review of the HFE system in May 2017. Victoria made a submission to the Commission opposing any changes to the distribution system. The report was handed down in May 2018, and recommended that the returns should be determined so as to allow for states to provide "a reasonable (rather than the same) standard" of infrastructure and services. However, the federal government decided to use the payments made to Victoria and NSW as the benchmark for future payments, offering a series of top-up payments to WA that would not come from the existing GST pool but from federal revenue.

== Introduction of GST floor and new equalisation benchmark ==
The federal government announced its final model in July 2018. The plan, which began in 2019–20, consisted of a floor of 70 per cent of population share in the financial year 2022–23, rising to 75 per cent from 2024–25, a guarantee which applies to all states and territories. The federal government would add additional federal funds to the GST pool to smooth the transition through to 2026–27, to make a "no worse-off guarantee" that no state or territory would have its share fall during this time. The WA government called the plan "compensation" for the state's previous low shares, and stated the new formula would ensure its return to a budget surplus.

Prior to the reforms, the CGC had used the fiscally strongest state as its equalisation benchmark. However, the new changes meant that the each state or territories relativity must be at least as high as the relativity of the standard state (the standard state being the fiscally stronger of Victoria or NSW).

At the 2019 federal election, the government campaigned on its GST solution in WA, as many of the state's sixteen seats were under threat from the opposition.

== Dissatisfaction with the reform ==
=== During the COVID-19 pandemic ===
WA recorded very low levels of infections by both national and international standards during the COVID-19 pandemic, allowing the state to live under only limited restrictions compared to the lockdowns seen in the eastern states. This resulted in little disruption to the state's economy relative to other states and territories. This, combined with substantially increased iron ore royalties (one of the state's main exports that saw a substantial price rise in 2020 and 2021), meant the state recorded the only surplus in the nation: $5.8 billion in the 2020–21 financial year.

On 4 August 2021, the Victorian Legislative Assembly established a public inquiry into the state's "share of federal GST funding". The governments of Tasmania, the Australian Capital Territory (ACT), and SA all made submissions opposing the new model of distribution, while WA made a submission supporting the reform. The inquiry tabled its report on 10 March 2022, concluding that WA was being unfairly advantaged over the other states and territories, and called for a return to the original HFE system without a payments floor.

The NSW Liberal treasurer Dominic Perrottet called McGowan the "Gollum of Australian politics" and demanded a review of the GST floor. The Victorian Labor treasurer Tim Pallas claimed the GST formula was being "manipulated" in WA's favour at the expense of the other states, and suggested the federal parties' support for the reform was intended to win support in Western Australia for the 2022 federal election.

Perrottet became NSW Premier in October and said his government would pursue a new GST distribution scheme. However, Morrison (who became leader of the federal Liberals and Prime Minister in August 2018) and federal Labor opposition leader Anthony Albanese both said they would not consider changing the formula implemented in 2018. McGowan drew some media attention after joking he would take a spear to meetings with Perrottet during a press conference in which he dismissed the NSW complaint.

SA also announced an inquiry into the distribution formula, which gained the support of the Victorian and Tasmanian state governments. The Liberal state treasurer Rob Lucas said the state government wanted the no worse-off guarantee to be permanent and the Productivity Commission inquiry scheduled for 2027 to be brought forward.

=== After the 2022 federal election ===
Ahead of the 2022 federal election, the CGC produced a report which concluded all states except WA would receive less under the new system than the old once the no worse-off guarantee expires in 2027. Pallas claimed the new distribution system "has nothing to do with making the GST fairer and everything to do with winning the west at the election." Newly-elected Labor SA Premier Peter Malinauskas also joined the criticism. At the federal level, both parties committed to maintaining the new system. Labor won the 2022 election, and Prime Minister Albanese and treasurer Jim Chalmers subsequently committed multiple times to maintaining the GST reform.

In November 2022, McGowan announced the creation of a state wealth fund backed by WA's mining sector, a policy that drew criticism from shadow treasurer Steve Thomas who believed it would justify demands to overturn the GST reform.

In December 2022, prior to the 2023 NSW state election, Perrottet again criticised the GST arrangement, again suggesting a review of the distribution. McGowan responded by stating that WA received less than it contributed while NSW received more than it contributed, saying "how that is unfair on NSW is a mystery to anyone with a brain". In the 2022–23 financial year, WA received a return of 70.000 cents per dollar collected (at the GST floor), whereas NSW received 95.065 cents per dollar of GST collected in that state. NSW opposition leader Chris Minns said that the state should prioritise its own budget repair before attacking the GST reform. However, in March 2023, Minns (who eventually won the state election and became premier) criticised the reform and stated NSW was entitled to a larger share. The NSW government hired a bureaucrat to lead a team of public servants to advance the state's interests in "federal financial relations".

In April 2023, ahead of the federal budget, the Liberal federal shadow treasurer Angus Taylor, warned the government not to use increased mining royalties to justify reducing WA's share of the GST. The same month, the Grattan Institute released a report on federal budget repair that included a recommendation to reverse the GST reform. Following the report Zoe Daniel, a Victorian teal independent, backed the Grattan Institute's report and argued that the WA deal was unjustified and should be rolled back entirely, due to the deficits faced in the federal and state and territory budgets. Kate Chaney, a teal from WA, responded to Daniel saying that the GST reform should not be altered and that WA should not be expected to compensate for fiscal mismanagement by other states. Further, Chaney argued that revenue from gambling taxes (a major source of revenue for the eastern states where slot machines are commonplace) should be included when calculating GST shares, as mineral royalties are. The McGowan government allocated $1.6 million to fund a dedicated team of eight staff within the Department of Treasury to advance the state's case to preserve the reform in time for the CGC's methodology review. The Liberal Tasmanian treasurer Michael Ferguson said that funding a dedicated team proved that the reforms were unfair, while WA opposition leader Shane Love, leader of the Nationals, said they were wasted since the final decision would be political, not mathematical.

WA projected a surplus of $4.2 billion when it delivered the 2022–23 budget, larger than the surplus forecasted by the federal government. WA forecast a further four years of budget surpluses. During his budget speech, McGowan said any changes to the reform that reduced the minimum share would be "contemptible and offensive". The 70 per cent of population share remained the lowest share awarded to any state or territory. The surplus (WA's sixth in a row) and projections of future surpluses prompted speculation that the federal government would be pressured into reneging on the reforms. McGowan said he believed it would be politically impossible for either major party to roll back the reforms given the severe electoral consequences they would suffer in WA. He again criticised other states and territories for demanding changes, pointing out that the no worse-off guarantee meant other jurisdictions would be in the same financial positions had the reforms never occurred.

McGowan announced his retirement in May 2023, prompting Labor state leaders Minns, Malinauskas, Andrews, and ACT Chief Minister Andrew Barr to all call for the federal government to undo the reforms, or failing that to continue paying the no-worse off guarantee indefinitely. SA treasurer Stephen Mullighan called the reform "the greatest act of vandalism" in the federation's history. McGowan's successor Roger Cook echoed McGowan's previous comments, stating states could not use the reform as an excuse for running deficits.

The 2023–24 Queensland budget projected a surplus of $12.3 billion as a result of increased coal revenues, the largest surplus ever recorded for a state or territory government. Labor Treasurer Cameron Dick said that the state was expected to hit the floor of 70 per cent of population share in 2024, and said that the floor gave the government "confidence, knowing that when we do get a big uplift, because of either price change or policy change, we won’t be penalised for that." Dick said that he expected National Cabinet to discuss extending the no worse-off guarantee beyond 2026–27: Dick said he would support an extension, and refused to criticise the share floor.

In June 2023, Chalmers's office denied a freedom of information request from Senator Smith who requested access to all correspondence between the federal treasurer and the treasurers of the other states and territories regarding the GST. Chalmers's office confirmed that they held approximately 500 pages of relevant material, but would not fulfill the request due to limited staffing capacity and the likelihood of the request unreasonably interfering with the treasurer's work.

On the eve of his government's first budget in September 2023, NSW treasurer Daniel Mookhey, a member of NSW Labor, revealed that his budget forecasts would work on the assumption that the no-worse off guarantee would be extended indefinitely. NSW was expected to receive approximately $3.8 billion from the federal government over 2023–24 and 2024–24.

=== Extension of top-up payments ===
In December 2023, National Cabinet met and struck an agreement that included extending top-up payments through to 2029–30 in exchange for a new funding arrangement for the National Disability Insurance Scheme. In February 2024, economists Saul Eslake and Chris Richardson suggested that the reform could cost the federal government over $50 billion by 2030, and asked the Productivity Commission to recommend abolishing the top-up payment. Eslake and Richardson argued that the reform was purely a political move to win seats in WA. WA treasurer Rita Saffioti argued that any federal government would "lose every seat in Western Australia" if they undid the reform and said that it was inconceivable that they would do so. New South Wales teal independent Allegra Spender gave her support for Eslake and Richardson's criticism of the reform. Saffioti and Chaney said that its repeal would incentivise the state not to invest in mining so as to avoid losing its GST share, a claim Eslake dismissed.

WA Liberal leader Libby Mettam and Chamber of Commerce and Industry WA CEO Chris Rodwell demanded that Albanese make a formal pledge to maintain the reformed GST arrangements. Following these demands, The West Australian ran a mockup of such a pledge with space for Albanese to sign: he did so when presented with the newspaper at a press conference, writing and signing the same pledge on journalist Dylan Caporn's arm.

In March 2024, Minns called for the GST distribution to be calculated according to a per capita formula, and likened WA to a "petrostate". Eslake and Barnett appeared together at the National Press Club in May 2024 to discuss "the GST debacle", with Eslake defending HFE distribution and Barnett arguing for a move to per-capita distribution. Following the 2024 federal budget, Chalmers stated that the money spent on the top-up payments was "worth it". Eslake argued that the expense was unjustified and based on an "entitlement mentality", contesting that WA's wealth was simply the coincidental result of having large natural resource reserves and a strong market price for those resources. Saffioti said Eslake was correct that "no one put the iron ore under the Pilbara and the gas under the Northwest shelf", but that they "don’t just jump out of the ground and onto a ship".

One Nation's support grew substantially in late 2025 and early 2026, and in May 2026 Hanson announced the party's commitment to the GST reform.

== 2026 Productivity Commission review ==
A review by the Productivity Commission is underway to consider the future of the 2018 reforms. The final report is due to be provided to the Australian Government by 31 December 2026.

On 14 August 2026, the Productivity Commission delivered its interim report, which found that Western Australia was the only state to have financially benefited from the 2018 reforms. The Commission concluded that the reforms had failed to meet their objectives and recommended reversing the 2018 arrangements. Premier Roger Cook described the report's authors as "east-coast clowns", but rejected the suggestion for Western Australia to secede from Australia. On 26 August 2026 the Government of Western Australia pointed out that:

Western Australia's GST share is currently 82% of the population, equal lowest with New South Wales. One of the 2018 GST Reforms was to introduce a minimum GST share so no state receives less than the stronger of Australia’s two largest states.

Without the 2018 GST Reforms, WA's GST share would fall to just 24% of our population share in 2026–27. No other state has ever received a share lower than 82% of population.

— Government of Western Australia

Productivity Commissioner Angela Jackson defended the Commission’s findings, saying that while it welcomed criticism of its work, Cook’s comments had "crossed a line" by attacking the Commission’s integrity. The findings and recommendations were welcomed by the other states and long-time critic Saul Eslake.

Later that month, Prime Minister Anthony Albanese pledged that there would be no changes to Western Australia’s GST arrangements while he remained prime minister. Jackson described the decision as "disappointing", but said the Commission’s review process would not be influenced by the Prime Minister’s comments. Journalist Clare Armstrong noted that the federal Labor party had largely consolidated its holdings in WA, and that Queensland increasingly offered electoral opportunity, weakening the election risk any changes to the GST reform had previously represented.

== Sources ==
- Commonwealth Grants Commission (10 March 2017). Report on GST Revenue Sharing Relativities, 2017 Update (PDF) (Report). Canberra: Commonwealth of Australia. ISBN 978-0-9923954-5-2. Archived from the original (PDF) on 6 March 2021.
- Nahan, Mike (27 August 2017). Western Australia and the Goods and Services Tax (PDF). The Twenty Ninth Conference of the Samuel Griffith Society. Melbourne: Samuel Griffith Society.
