= Allegra Spender =

Australian businesswoman and politician (born 1978)

Allegra Spender MP
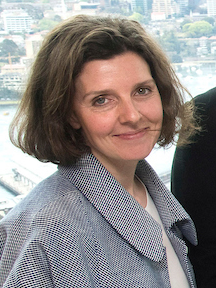
- Spender in 2018

Member of the Australian Parliament for Wentworth
- Incumbent
- Assumed office 21 May 2022
- Preceded by: Dave Sharma

Personal details
- Born: 10 March 1978 (age 48) Sydney, New South Wales, Australia
- Party: Community Strong (since 2026)
- Other political affiliations: Independent (until 2026)
- Spouse: Mark Capps
- Children: 3
- Parents: John Spender (father); Carla Zampatti (mother)
- Relatives: Sir Percy Spender (grandfather); Lady Spender (grandmother); Bianca Spender (sister)
- Education: Trinity College, Cambridge (BA); University of London (MSc)
- Occupation: Politician; business executive; management consultant
- Website: www.allegraspender.com.au

Allegra Spender (born 10 March 1978) is an Australian politician and businesswoman. She is currently the member of parliament for Wentworth, having originally won the seat at the 2022 federal election. Originally elected as a teal independent, Spender co-founded the political party Community Strong Australia with Zali Steggall in 2026.

She is the third generation of her family to sit in federal parliament, after her grandfather Sir Percy Spender and father John Spender. Before entering politics, Spender was a management consultant at McKinsey & Company. She also worked as managing director of her mother Carla Zampatti's fashion label.

== Early life and education ==
Allegra Spender was born in Sydney on 10 March 1978. She is the daughter of former Liberal politician and diplomat John Spender and fashion designer Carla Zampatti. Her grandfather, Sir Percy Spender, was a Liberal MP under Prime Minister Robert Menzies, a diplomat and the president of the International Court of Justice. Sir Percy was one of the key authors of both the ANZUS Treaty and the Colombo Plan. Her grandmother was Lady Jean Spender, a novelist. Her sister is fashion designer Bianca Spender. Her half-brother is Alex Schuman.

Spender attended Ascham School, where she was head girl and Dux, and achieved a UAI of 99.95.

She received a BA in economics from the University of Cambridge, where she was at Trinity College, and an MSc in organisational psychology at the University of London.

== Career ==
Spender started her career as a management consultant at McKinsey & Company before working as a policy analyst in the UK Treasury. She later worked as a Change Leader at London's King's College Hospital and as a consultant in Kenya for TechnoServe. Spender was the managing director for her mother's fashion label Carla Zampatti for 9 years. She was also the Chair of the Sydney Renewable Power Company and the CEO of the Australian Business & Community Network (ABCN), a social mobility charity that links students from low socio-economic schools and mentors from business.

Spender is a regular contributor to the Australian Financial Review. Her articles have covered topics including productivity and innovation, migration, business dynamism, industrial relations, tax reform, the impact of independents in parliament, and the relationship between business and government.

Spender has also written for outlets including The Australian, Renew Economy, and Women's Agenda.

== Politics ==
In early 2020, a local group of professional women established Voices of Wentworth. The group was concerned primarily with the Morrison government’s lack of evidence-based climate action, integrity in politics and record on supporting women. Voices of Wentworth was inspired by the impact of similar Voices groups in the electorates of Indi and Warringah.

In 2021, Spender was approached by a separate group of locals “Wentworth Independents” who were seeking an Independent candidate to run in the division of Wentworth at the 2022 Australian federal election. The group wanted a woman with "deep local roots and an impressive CV" who shared the community's core beliefs on the need for more integrity in politics, action on climate change and gender equality. After initially declining the approach, Spender announced her intention to run in November 2021, citing government inaction on climate change as one of the key reasons for her candidature.

She defeated Liberal incumbent Dave Sharma with 54 percent of the two-party vote, becoming one of several community independents to unseat Liberal incumbents. The seat of Wentworth had previously been in the hands of the Liberals or their predecessors almost entirely since Federation.

Spender won the seat of Wentworth for a second time at the 2025 Australian federal election with an increased margin, primarily due to electoral boundary redistribution resulting in Wentworth absorbing the left-wing inner-city suburbs of Woolloomooloo and Darlinghurst. She also succeeded in winning the primary vote.

On 20 November 2025, prominent National Socialist Network (NSN) member Joel Davis was arrested by the Australian Federal Police in Sydney, after he had sent a allegedly menacing message in a group chat on Telegram about Spender, who had criticised a NSN rally. Davis was released in March 2026 on strict bail conditions.

On 25 June 2026, Spender announced she was forming the Community Strong Australia party with Zali Steggall.

== Political views ==
During her first term, Spender was the co-chair of several parliamentary friendship groups, including the Parliamentary Friends of International Holocaust Remembrance Alliance (IHRA), the Parliamentary Friends of the Uluru Statement from the Heart, the Parliamentary Friends of Tech and Innovation, the Parliamentary Friends of Early Childhood, the Parliamentary Friends of Entrepreneurs, Small and Medium Businesses, the Parliamentary Friends of the Sydney Swans, and the Parliamentary Friends of Running.

=== Climate action ===
Spender supports action on climate change, campaigning in the 2022 Australian federal election for a 50% reduction in Australian emissions by 2030 and bringing in vehicle emission standards to reduce transport emissions. In her first fortnight in parliament, Spender secured amendments to strengthen the Climate Change Act by requiring sector-by-sector assessments of emissions reduction policies. During the course of the 47th parliament, she also played a key role in successfully advocating for the introduction of fuel efficiency standards for new vehicles, funding to support household electrification, and greater private investment in nature protection.

=== Tax reform ===
Since entering parliament, Spender has also been a vocal advocate for economic and tax reform. She has twice addressed the National Press Club of Australia on economic policy issues, making the case for broad tax reform in January 2024 and for 'economic reform from the sensible centre' in October 2024. Spender has undertaken her own tax roundtable process during the 47th parliament, working with experts such as former Treasury secretary Ken Henry and ANU Tax and Transfer Policy Institute director Robert Breunig – as well as business groups, unions, and community groups. She has been outspoken in her support for lowering income taxes and replacing stamp duty with land tax. In her second National Press Club of Australia address in October 2024, Spender set out an economic reform agenda that included: (i) making it easier to do business by reducing red tape; (ii) ramping up innovation and investment in early stage companies; (iii) improving the integrity of government spending – especially infrastructure; and (iv) reforming the tax system. In late 2024 she released her own tax green paper into the Australian taxation system and lead a push to change the definition of a small business from one with 15 employees to 25 employees.

Spender is a member of the House of Representatives Standing Committee on Economics and the Joint Standing Committee on Migration. She has made significant additional contributions to reports made by the committees during the 47th parliament, including in relation to the Better Competition, Better Prices Inquiry and the Migration, Pathway to Nation Building Inquiry.

Spender opposes the 2018 GST reform.

Spender revealed her tax proposals through a white paper released on 11 March 2026.

=== Integrity in politics ===
Spender has campaigned strongly on integrity – including the establishment of the National Anti-Corruption Commission and the improvement of behaviour in parliament. She has described question time as a "complete waste of time", labelling the practice as the "biggest disappointment" from her time in politics and criticising the behaviour in parliament as "unlike any workplace I've ever been in". In October 2024, Spender resigned her membership of the Qantas Chairman's Lounge and the Virgin equivalent, saying it was time to end the practice of politicians accepting airline upgrades.

=== Antisemitism ===
As the representative of the largest Jewish community in Australia, Spender has called for continued action against antisemitism, giving 14 separate speeches in Parliament and speaking extensively in the media. Spender advocated for the appointment of a Special Envoy to Combat Antisemitism, and helped to secure $8.5 million for the Sydney Jewish Museum.

On 4 February 2025, some 14 months after the pro-Palestinian rally on 9 October 2023 in front of the Sydney Opera House, where some rally members chanted antisemitic statements, Spender introduced a motion condemning antisemitism which was passed unanimously by the Australian Parliament. On the same day, she also introduced an amendment to expand hate crimes legislation to outlaw serious vilification.

Perceived inaction over antisemitism and anti-Zionism was a significant topic of debate between Spender and her Liberal challenger, Ro Knox, in the 2025 election, with Knox accusing Spender’s volunteers of deliberately putting a campaign poster on top of an image of an Israeli family kidnapped by Hamas on October 7. Spender had previously been uninvited from a charity event hosted by Jewish Zionist non-profit group B'nai B'rith after she signed a joint letter with other teal MPs requesting that Foreign Minister Penny Wong restore funding to UNRWA.

=== LGBTQIA+ rights ===
When the Labor government announced in August 2024 that it would not include questions on LGBTQIA+ identity in the next census, Spender successfully advocated for the decision to be reversed.

=== Voting record ===
As of August 2024, Spender's record shows that she has supported 56% of votes called by the Coalition, 50% of votes called by the Labor Party, and 49% of votes called by the Greens.

=== Bondi Junction stabbings ===
On 13 April 2024, the Bondi Junction stabbings took place in Spender's electorate of Wentworth. Spender was a highly visible presence in the aftermath of the attacks, comforting local constituents at the site and leading tributes alongside Prime Minister Anthony Albanese and NSW Premier Chris Minns.

Following the attacks, Spender joined with Elizabeth Young – the mother of Jade Young, one of the victims of the attack – to call for mental health reform across state, territory, and federal governments.

== Personal life ==
Spender has three children with her husband, Mark Capps, a Canva executive. As of May 2024, she lives in Darling Point in Sydney and has properties in Woollahra and Great Mackerel Beach in New South Wales.

Spender is a regular runner, reportedly getting up at 5:30am during parliamentary sitting weeks to go running.

In 2026, The Australian reported that Spender was likely the wealthiest member of federal parliament, after inheriting part of her mother's $129 million estate.

Parliament of Australia
Preceded by Dave Sharma	Member for Wentworth; 2022–present	Incumbent
