= Bianca Spender =

Australian fashion designer

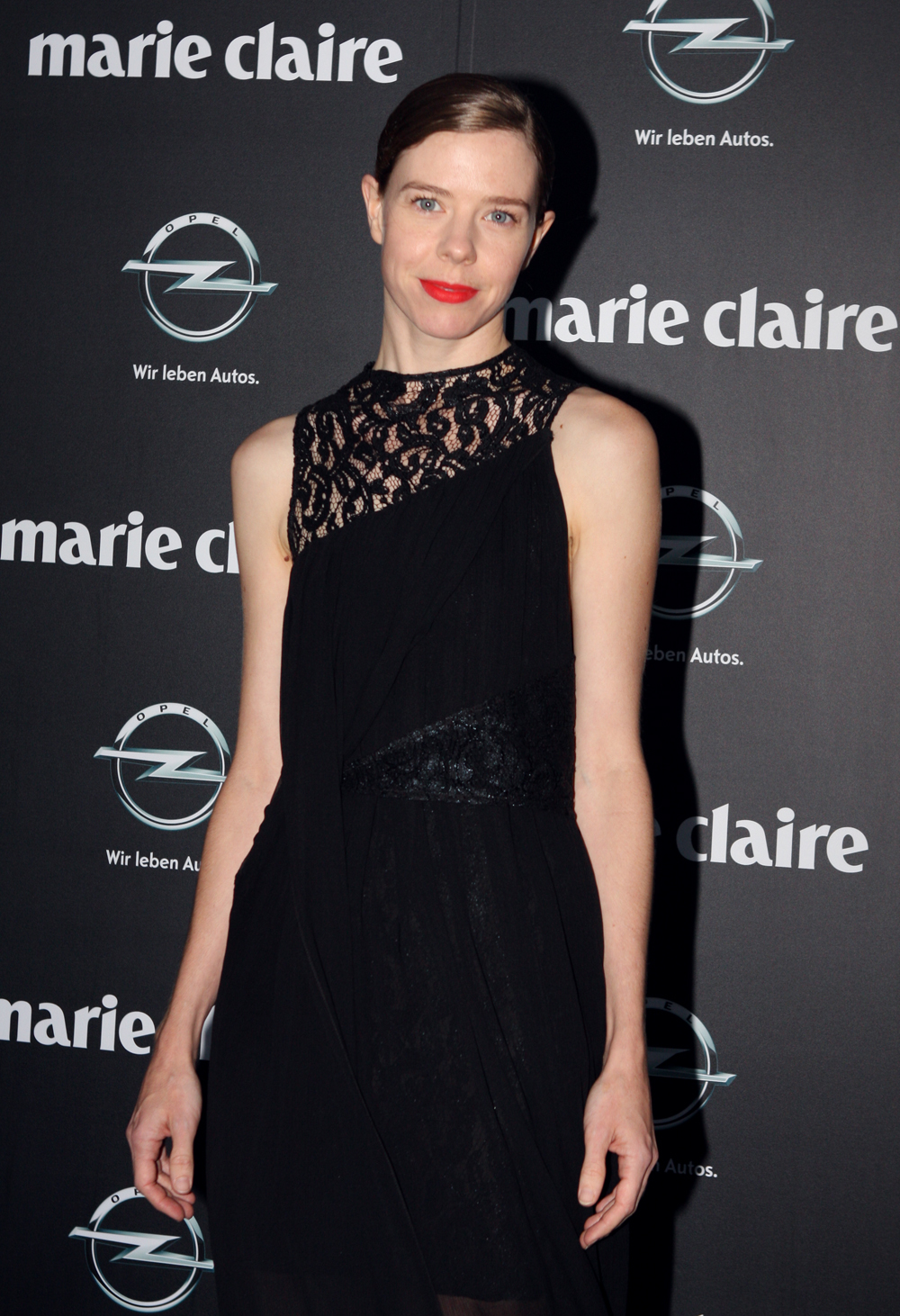
- Born: 1976 (age 49–50); Sydney, New South Wales, Australia
- Occupation: Fashion designer
- Years active: 2004–present
- Partner: Sam McGuinness
- Children: 2
- Website: biancaspender.com

Bianca Spender (born 1976) is an Australian fashion designer.

== Early life ==
Spender was born in 1976 to Italian Australian fashion designer Carla Zampatti and former Liberal politician John Spender.

About her family, she stated "I grew up in the shadow of a larger-than-life mother, who was passionate about her success, and passionate about teaching her children to understand the value of money, hard work, and independence. My father, on the other hand, was an intellectual, a diplomat and a quiet, considerate thinker from a privileged family".

Spender earned a Bachelor of Commerce at the East Sydney Fashion Design School.

== Career ==
Spender started her fashion career designing in her mother’s studio from age 12. After completing her degree, Spender travelled to Italy and Paris to immerse herself in pattern making and design. She eventually joined the Carla Zampatti brand and launched "Bianca Spender for Carla Zampatti".

In 2017 Spender branched out with her own namesake label, 'Bianca Spender', which was initially stocked through David Jones stores.

== Personal life ==
Spender has a sister, businesswoman and politician Allegra Spender, and a half-brother.

She lives in Sydney with husband Sam McGuinness, whom she met in 2005 at a gig. The couple have two sons.

Spender is interested in healthy living and is a vegetarian.
