= Joe Saba =

Australian fashion designer

Joe Saba (born 1940) is an Australian fashion designer and fashion business owner of Lebanese descent.

Saba started his fashion business in 1965 with the opening a store in 287 Flinders Lane Melbourne called the Joseph Saba Shirt and Sweater Shop. The Saba store was opened later in Collins Street, Melbourne. In 1969, he established a label for Jeans called "Staggers". The Saba label established in 1974, also was used on men's and women's clothing. Up to 17 stores had the Saba title. In the 1980s, he sold the designs of Japanese designers such as Rei Kawakubo and Yohji Yamamoto in Australia. In 1996, he won the Australian Fashion Menswear Award.

In 2002, he sold his fashion business to Daniel and Danielle Besen. The Saba label is now owned by The Apparel Group.

Recently he has started a new set of designs called "Nine by Joseph Saba". He is married to Marita Saba. His garments are on display in the Powerhouse Museum in Sydney.

In 2005, he was honoured on a commemorative Australian postage stamp, along with other Australian fashion designers.
