= Collette Dinnigan =

Australian fashion designer

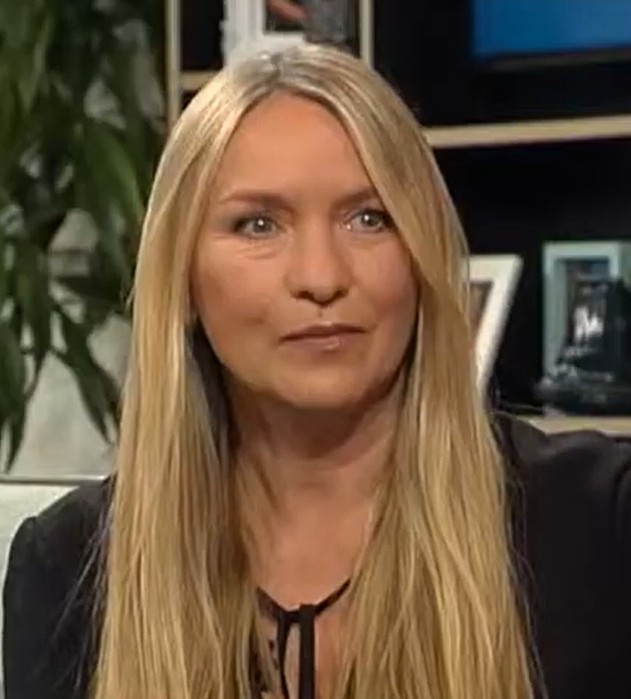
Dinnigan in 2017

Collette Mary Ann Dinnigan AO (born 24 September 1965) is an Australian fashion designer. Born in South Africa and raised in New Zealand, Dinnigan moved to Australia, where she worked for the Australian Broadcasting Corporation. She opened her own range in 1990, with the launch of a dry-clean only lingerie collection, and was the first Australian to launch a ready-to-wear collection, in Paris in 1995.

== Early life ==
Collette Dinnigan was born in South Africa on 24 September 1965. When she was eight, her family including a younger brother lived on their yacht for a number of years, eventually sailing around the southern coast of Australia and on to New Zealand, where they decided to remain. She graduated from a fashion design course at Wellington Polytechnic because she liked fashion designing. She later moved to Sydney, where she worked for the Australian Broadcasting Corporation's costume department.

== Career and fashion range ==
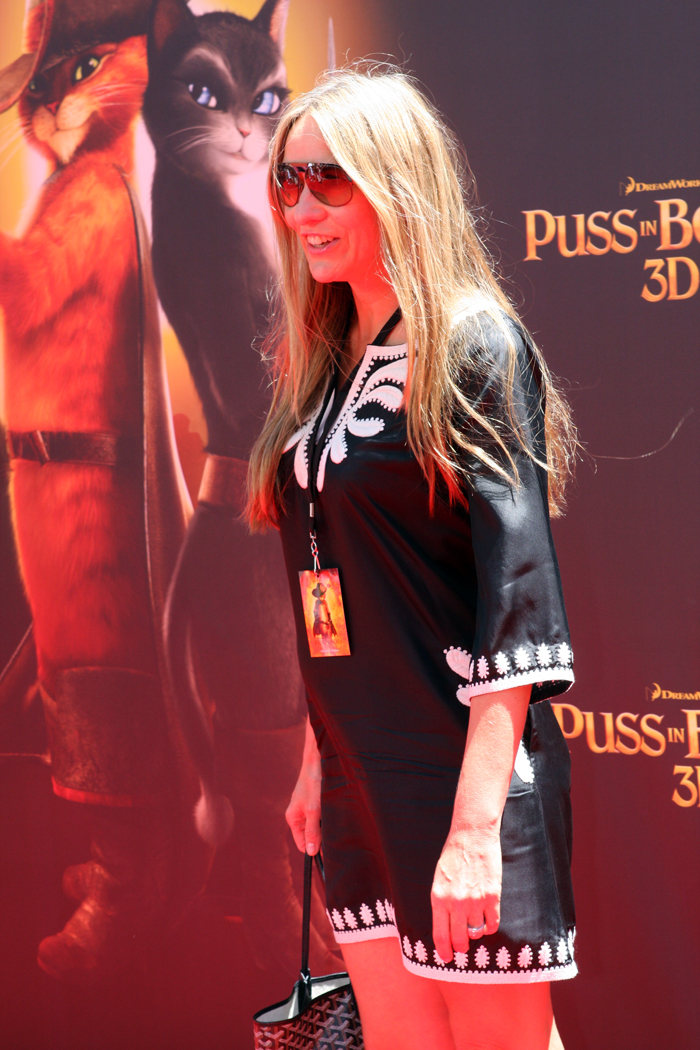
Collette Dinnigan at the Puss in Boots Australian premiere, in November 2011

In 1995, Dinnigan was the first Australian to launch a ready-to-wear collection in Paris; she was also the first to be asked to be in the 'ready-to-wear parade' in Paris. Her range was stocked in her stores in Sydney, Melbourne and London, and in David Jones department stores.

In 2001, Dinnigan opened her first store on Greg Street in Sydney's Paddington, and imported stuff to her fashions to Barneys New York, Harvey Nichols in London and Hong Kong.

In 2002, UK retailer Marks & Spencer invited Dinnigan to create a branded collection of lingerie exclusively for their stores and Target stores in Australia. Wild Hearts by Collette Dinnigan launched and recorded impressive results.

At the end of 2013 Dinnigan significantly scaled down her business, closing her boutiques in Sydney, Melbourne and London and stopping production of her bridal and evening wear lines. Approximately 80% of her staff lost their jobs. Dinnigan emphasised that the business was still profitable and had no debt; she was scaling back because she wanted to spend more time with her family.

== Personal life ==
Dinnigan has a daughter, Estella, with her former partner Richard Wilkins and a son, Hunter, with husband, hotelier Bradley Cocks.

In February 2026, Dinnigan told The Australian that she plans to release her upcoming book, "A Journey Home". It chronicles Dinnigan's return to South Africa for the first time since leaving at the age of 8.

== See also ==
- List of Marks & Spencer brands
