= Electorate opinion polling for the 2022 Australian federal election =

Various research and polling firms conducted opinion polling before the 2022 federal election in individual electorates across Australia, in relation to voting intentions in the Australian House of Representatives.

== Australian Capital Territory ==
Date	Brand	Seat	Sample size	Primary vote								2PP vote	
Date	Brand	Seat	Sample size	Lib	ALP	GRN	Pocock	Rubenstein	ON	UAP	OTH	Lib	ALP
6 May 2022	RedBridge	Senate	1064	25%	27%	11%	21%	6%	—N/a	6%	4%	—N/a	—N/a
14 Apr – 7 May 2022	YouGov	Bean	—N/a	24%	44%	11%	—N/a	—N/a	2%	2%	17%	37%	63%
14 Apr – 7 May 2022	YouGov	Canberra	—N/a	20%	46%	24%	—N/a	—N/a	1%	1%	8%	28%	72%
14 Apr – 7 May 2022	YouGov	Fenner	—N/a	30%	46%	18%	—N/a	—N/a	2%	2%	2%	36%	64%
6 Apr 2022	RedBridge	Senate	—N/a	25%	37%	14%	11%	—N/a	—N/a	—N/a	—N/a	—N/a	—N/a
6 Apr 2022	RedBridge	Senate	—N/a	24%	35%	15%	13%	—N/a	—N/a	—N/a	—N/a	—N/a	—N/a

== New South Wales ==
Date	Brand	Seat	Sample size	Primary vote							2PP vote			
Date	Brand	Seat	Sample size	L/NP	ALP	IND	GRN	ON	UAP	OTH	L/NP	ALP	IND	GRN
17 May 2022	Laidlaw Campaigns	Fowler	618	—N/a	42%	—N/a	—N/a	—N/a	—N/a	—N/a	—N/a	45%	38%	—N/a
15 May 2022	Industry Association	Robertson	800	—N/a	—N/a	—N/a	—N/a	—N/a	—N/a	—N/a	42%	58%	—N/a	—N/a
15 May 2022	Industry Association	Reid	800	—N/a	—N/a	—N/a	—N/a	—N/a	—N/a	—N/a	47%	53%	—N/a	—N/a
15 May 2022	Industry Association	Parramatta	800	—N/a	—N/a	—N/a	—N/a	—N/a	—N/a	—N/a	46%	54%	—N/a	—N/a
15 May 2022	Industry Association	Gilmore	800	—N/a	—N/a	—N/a	—N/a	—N/a	—N/a	—N/a	44%	56%	—N/a	—N/a
15 May 2022	Industry Association	Shortland	800	—N/a	—N/a	—N/a	—N/a	—N/a	—N/a	—N/a	43%	57%	—N/a	—N/a
15 May 2022	Industry Association	Hunter	800	—N/a	—N/a	—N/a	—N/a	—N/a	—N/a	—N/a	49%	51%	—N/a	—N/a
15 May 2022	Industry Association	Lindsay	800	—N/a	—N/a	—N/a	—N/a	—N/a	—N/a	—N/a	57%	43%	—N/a	—N/a
3–14 May 2022	RedBridge	North Sydney	1267	33.3%	17.8%	23.5%	—N/a	—N/a	—N/a	—N/a	—N/a	—N/a	—N/a	—N/a
1–7 May 2022	RedBridge	Wentworth	1117	36.0%	11.7%	33.3%	6.2%	—N/a	5.3%	—N/a	—N/a	—N/a	—N/a	—N/a
6 May 2022	Compass Polling	North Sydney	507	40.5%	21.6%	13.6%	12.9%	3.0%	1.4%	6.1%	54%	46%	—N/a	—N/a
14 Apr – 7 May 2022	YouGov	Banks	—N/a	45%	38%	(Note: Independent primary votes are counted under the "other" column)	9%	2%	3%	3%	52%	48%	—N/a	—N/a
14 Apr – 7 May 2022	YouGov	Barton	—N/a	36%	49%		9%	2%	3%	3%	41%	59%	—N/a	—N/a
14 Apr – 7 May 2022	YouGov	Bennelong	—N/a	44%	40%		9%	2%	3%	2%	50%	50%	—N/a	—N/a
14 Apr – 7 May 2022	YouGov	Blaxland	—N/a	29%	50%		13%	3%	5%	—N/a	36%	64%	—N/a	—N/a
14 Apr – 7 May 2022	YouGov	Berowra	—N/a	50%	29%		12%	3%	1%	5%	58%	42%	—N/a	—N/a
14 Apr – 7 May 2022	YouGov	Bradfield	—N/a	49%	30%		11%	2%	3%	5%	58%	42%	—N/a	—N/a
14 Apr – 7 May 2022	YouGov	Calare	—N/a	43%	26%		5%	9%	6%	11%	60%	40%	—N/a	—N/a
14 Apr – 7 May 2022	YouGov	Chifley	—N/a	28%	50%		6%	4%	2%	10%	40%	60%	—N/a	—N/a
14 Apr – 7 May 2022	YouGov	Cook	—N/a	55%	29%		7%	4%	5%	—N/a	62%	38%	—N/a	—N/a
14 Apr – 7 May 2022	YouGov	Cowper	—N/a	42%	21%		7%	11%	2%	17%	68%	32%	—N/a	—N/a
14 Apr – 7 May 2022	YouGov	Cunningham	—N/a	29%	46%		15%	3%	6%	1%	37%	63%	—N/a	—N/a
14 Apr – 7 May 2022	YouGov	Dobell	—N/a	36%	42%		9%	4%	6%	3%	46%	54%	—N/a	—N/a
14 Apr – 7 May 2022	YouGov	Eden-Monaro	—N/a	35%	44%		7%	3%	2%	9%	43%	57%	—N/a	—N/a
14 Apr – 7 May 2022	YouGov	Farrer	—N/a	48%	21%		7%	9%	5%	10%	73%	27%	—N/a	—N/a
14 Apr – 7 May 2022	YouGov	Fowler	—N/a	28%	50%		7%	5%	6%	4%	38%	62%	—N/a	—N/a
14 Apr – 7 May 2022	YouGov	Gilmore	—N/a	39%	39%		11%	5%	2%	4%	47%	53%	—N/a	—N/a
14 Apr – 7 May 2022	YouGov	Grayndler	—N/a	20%	53%		20%	1%	1%	5%	—N/a	69%	—N/a	31%
14 Apr – 7 May 2022	YouGov	Greenway	—N/a	38%	44%		8%	3%	2%	5%	47%	53%	—N/a	—N/a
14 Apr – 7 May 2022	YouGov	Hughes	—N/a	42%	31%		6%	2%	5%	14%	56%	44%	—N/a	—N/a
14 Apr – 7 May 2022	YouGov	Hume	—N/a	47%	32%		6%	4%	5%	6%	59%	41%	—N/a	—N/a
14 Apr – 7 May 2022	YouGov	Hunter	—N/a	16%	42%		10%	16%	6%	10%	40%	60%	—N/a	—N/a
14 Apr – 7 May 2022	YouGov	Kingsford Smith	—N/a	35%	44%		15%	2%	4%	—N/a	41%	59%	—N/a	—N/a
14 Apr – 7 May 2022	YouGov	Lindsay	—N/a	40%	40%		8%	6%	3%	3%	50%	50%	—N/a	—N/a
14 Apr – 7 May 2022	YouGov	Lyne	—N/a	38%	28%		6%	6%	3%	19%	56%	44%	—N/a	—N/a
14 Apr – 7 May 2022	YouGov	Macarthur	—N/a	28%	51%		8%	7%	4%	2%	38%	62%	—N/a	—N/a
14 Apr – 7 May 2022	YouGov	Mackellar	—N/a	45%	20%		7%	3%	2%	23%	53%	—N/a	47%	—N/a
14 Apr – 7 May 2022	YouGov	Macquarie	—N/a	39%	40%		10%	3%	2%	6%	47%	53%	—N/a	—N/a
14 Apr – 7 May 2022	YouGov	McMahon	—N/a	35%	39%		7%	5%	5%	5%	44%	56%	—N/a	—N/a
14 Apr – 7 May 2022	YouGov	Mitchell	—N/a	50%	30%		10%	5%	3%	2%	59%	41%	—N/a	—N/a
14 Apr – 7 May 2022	YouGov	New England	—N/a	40%	21%		6%	10%	3%	20%	68%	32%	—N/a	—N/a
14 Apr – 7 May 2022	YouGov	Newcastle	—N/a	27%	50%		15%	3%	2%	3%	33%	67%	—N/a	—N/a
14 Apr – 7 May 2022	YouGov	North Sydney	—N/a	38%	30%		10%	2%	2%	18%	53%	47%	—N/a	—N/a
14 Apr – 7 May 2022	YouGov	Page	—N/a	37%	31%		9%	6%	2%	15%	52%	48%	—N/a	—N/a
14 Apr – 7 May 2022	YouGov	Parkes	—N/a	35%	32%		5%	7%	4%	17%	54%	46%	—N/a	—N/a
14 Apr – 7 May 2022	YouGov	Parramatta	—N/a	37%	47%		7%	3%	2%	4%	43%	57%	—N/a	—N/a
14 Apr – 7 May 2022	YouGov	Paterson	—N/a	30%	47%		7%	10%	3%	3%	42%	58%	—N/a	—N/a
14 Apr – 7 May 2022	YouGov	Reid	—N/a	37%	44%		11%	2%	3%	3%	44%	56%	—N/a	—N/a
14 Apr – 7 May 2022	YouGov	Richmond	—N/a	25%	32%		18%	3%	2%	20%	41%	59%	—N/a	—N/a
14 Apr – 7 May 2022	YouGov	Riverina	—N/a	41%	29%		6%	6%	5%	13%	59%	41%	—N/a	—N/a
14 Apr – 7 May 2022	YouGov	Robertson	—N/a	39%	39%		9%	5%	5%	3%	49%	51%	—N/a	—N/a
14 Apr – 7 May 2022	YouGov	Shortland	—N/a	28%	43%		11%	3%	5%	10%	40%	60%	—N/a	—N/a
14 Apr – 7 May 2022	YouGov	Sydney	—N/a	23%	51%		21%	1%	2%	2%	28%	72%	—N/a	—N/a
14 Apr – 7 May 2022	YouGov	Warringah	—N/a	32%	12%		5%	4%	2%	45%	41%	—N/a	59%	—N/a
14 Apr – 7 May 2022	YouGov	Watson	—N/a	29%	55%		7%	5%	4%	11%	35%	65%	—N/a	—N/a
14 Apr – 7 May 2022	YouGov	Wentworth	—N/a	48%	16%		5%	3%	2%	26%	56%	—N/a	44%	—N/a
14 Apr – 7 May 2022	YouGov	Werriwa	—N/a	36%	41%		7%	4%	5%	7%	47%	53%	—N/a	—N/a
14 Apr – 7 May 2022	YouGov	Whitlam	—N/a	23%	50%		12%	6%	5%	4%	36%	64%	—N/a	—N/a
28 Apr 2022	RedBridge	Parramatta	—N/a	26.4%	32.4%		10.7%	—N/a	7.2%	11.9%	45%	55%	—N/a	—N/a
28 Apr 2022	RedBridge	Wentworth	—N/a	36.6%	16.2%	24.3%	7.0%	—N/a	6.3%	5.3%	47%	—N/a	53%	—N/a
11–12 Apr 2022	Community Engagement	North Sydney	1114	37.4%	17.4%	19.4%	8.7%	—N/a	5.6%	—N/a	—N/a	—N/a	—N/a	—N/a
7 Apr 2022	uComms	Mackellar	833	35.2%	18.0%	23.9%	—N/a	—N/a	—N/a	—N/a	—N/a	—N/a	—N/a	—N/a
20–21 Mar 2022	KJC Research	Wentworth	1036	42%	14%	27%	9%	—N/a	3%	4%	49%	—N/a	51%	—N/a
28 Jan 2022	uComms	Wentworth	850	35.6%	18.6%	27.7%	7.5%	—N/a	—N/a	—N/a	44%	—N/a	56%	—N/a
28 Jan 2022	uComms	North Sydney	850	34.1%	22.9%	20%	11.2%	—N/a	—N/a	—N/a	—N/a	—N/a	—N/a	—N/a

== Northern Territory ==
Date	Brand	Seat	Sample size	Primary vote						2PP vote	
Date	Brand	Seat	Sample size	CLP	ALP	GRN	ON	UAP	OTH	CLP	ALP
14 Apr – 7 May 2022	YouGov	Lingiari	—N/a	32%	43%	12%	7%	1%	5%	43%	57%
14 Apr – 7 May 2022	YouGov	Solomon	—N/a	33%	40%	15%	5%	4%	3%	44%	56%

== Queensland ==
Date	Brand	Seat	Sample size	Primary vote						2PP vote		
Date	Brand	Seat	Sample size	LNP	ALP	GRN	ON	UAP	OTH	LNP	ALP	OTH
14 Apr – 7 May 2022	YouGov	Blair	—N/a	30%	36%	12%	11%	4%	7%	46%	54%	—N/a
14 Apr – 7 May 2022	YouGov	Bonner	—N/a	46%	32%	15%	4%	3%	—N/a	54%	46%	—N/a
14 Apr – 7 May 2022	YouGov	Bowman	—N/a	44%	32%	12%	6%	5%	1%	55%	45%	—N/a
14 Apr – 7 May 2022	YouGov	Brisbane	—N/a	36%	29%	28%	2%	3%	2%	46%	54%	—N/a
14 Apr – 7 May 2022	YouGov	Capricornia	—N/a	38%	27%	7%	16%	4%	8%	59%	41%	—N/a
14 Apr – 7 May 2022	YouGov	Dawson	—N/a	33%	30%	7%	19%	3%	8%	56%	44%	—N/a
14 Apr – 7 May 2022	YouGov	Dickson	—N/a	42%	30%	13%	4%	5%	6%	53%	47%	—N/a
14 Apr – 7 May 2022	YouGov	Fadden	—N/a	44%	26%	8%	8%	7%	7%	61%	39%	—N/a
14 Apr – 7 May 2022	YouGov	Fairfax	—N/a	45%	24%	15%	7%	4%	5%	58%	42%	—N/a
14 Apr – 7 May 2022	YouGov	Fisher	—N/a	42%	28%	15%	6%	6%	3%	55%	45%	—N/a
14 Apr – 7 May 2022	YouGov	Flynn	—N/a	33%	32%	5%	16%	8%	6%	54%	46%	—N/a
14 Apr – 7 May 2022	YouGov	Forde	—N/a	38%	30%	10%	9%	5%	8%	55%	45%	—N/a
14 Apr – 7 May 2022	YouGov	Griffith	—N/a	32%	36%	26%	3%	3%	—N/a	40%	60%	—N/a
14 Apr – 7 May 2022	YouGov	Groom	—N/a	48%	24%	8%	12%	2%	6%	64%	36%	—N/a
14 Apr – 7 May 2022	YouGov	Herbert	—N/a	38%	27%	7%	11%	4%	13%	56%	44%	—N/a
14 Apr – 7 May 2022	YouGov	Hinkler	—N/a	44%	27%	7%	14%	3%	5%	60%	40%	—N/a
14 Apr – 7 May 2022	YouGov	Kennedy	—N/a	27%	17%	7%	—N/a	6%	43%	38%	—N/a	62%
14 Apr – 7 May 2022	YouGov	Leichhardt	—N/a	35%	32%	12%	10%	5%	6%	51%	49%	—N/a
14 Apr – 7 May 2022	YouGov	Lilley	—N/a	38%	41%	13%	4%	1%	3%	46%	54%	—N/a
14 Apr – 7 May 2022	YouGov	Longman	—N/a	36%	38%	6%	11%	2%	7%	50%	50%	—N/a
14 Apr – 7 May 2022	YouGov	Maranoa	—N/a	52%	19%	4%	15%	5%	5%	73%	27%	—N/a
14 Apr – 7 May 2022	YouGov	McPherson	—N/a	42%	25%	17%	6%	6%	4%	56%	44%	—N/a
14 Apr – 7 May 2022	YouGov	Moncrieff	—N/a	48%	23%	9%	7%	7%	6%	64%	34%	—N/a
14 Apr – 7 May 2022	YouGov	Moreton	—N/a	36%	38%	18%	2%	4%	2%	44%	56%	—N/a
14 Apr – 7 May 2022	YouGov	Oxley	—N/a	33%	46%	12%	6%	3%	—N/a	42%	58%	—N/a
14 Apr – 7 May 2022	YouGov	Petrie	—N/a	44%	31%	10%	6%	7%	2%	56%	44%	—N/a
14 Apr – 7 May 2022	YouGov	Rankin	—N/a	28%	40%	12%	9%	7%	4%	42%	58%	—N/a
14 Apr – 7 May 2022	YouGov	Ryan	—N/a	40%	25%	24%	2%	3%	6%	50%	50%	—N/a
14 Apr – 7 May 2022	YouGov	Wide Bay	—N/a	45%	25%	8%	10%	2%	10%	59%	41%	—N/a
14 Apr – 7 May 2022	YouGov	Wright	—N/a	35%	22%	10%	20%	9%	4%	56%	44%	—N/a
28 Jan 2022	United Workers Union	Dickson	1200	40%	34%	10%	5%	5%	4%	51%	49%	—N/a

== South Australia ==
Date	Brand	Seat	Sample size	Primary vote							2PP vote		
Date	Brand	Seat	Sample size	Lib	ALP	GRN	IND	ON	UAP	OTH	Lib	ALP	OTH
14 Apr – 7 May 2022	YouGov	Adelaide	—N/a	34%	43%	15%		3%	3%	2%	40%	60%	—N/a
14 Apr – 7 May 2022	YouGov	Barker	—N/a	48%	26%	6%		8%	6%	6%	62%	38%	—N/a
14 Apr – 7 May 2022	YouGov	Boothby	—N/a	37%	38%	11%		2%	1%	11%	47%	53%	—N/a
14 Apr – 7 May 2022	YouGov	Grey	—N/a	41%	29%	5%		12%	3%	10%	57%	43%	—N/a
14 Apr – 7 May 2022	YouGov	Hindmarsh	—N/a	34%	43%	13%		3%	3%	4%	42%	58%	—N/a
14 Apr – 7 May 2022	YouGov	Kingston	—N/a	28%	52%	9%		3%	3%	5%	36%	64%	—N/a
14 Apr – 7 May 2022	YouGov	Makin	—N/a	31%	50%	9%		3%	5%	2%	39%	61%	—N/a
14 Apr – 7 May 2022	YouGov	Mayo	—N/a	34%	20%	8%		8%	2%	28%	48%	—N/a	52%
14 Apr – 7 May 2022	YouGov	Spence	—N/a	28%	48%	9%		8%	4%	3%	38%	62%	—N/a
14 Apr – 7 May 2022	YouGov	Sturt	—N/a	42%	36%	15%		2%	2%	3%	50%	50%	—N/a
5 Apr 2022	uComms	Senate	1052	32.2%	36.1%	11.6%	8.2% (Note: 5.2% Nick Xenophon, 3.0% Rex Patrick)	3.9%	2.7%	3.2%	—N/a	—N/a	—N/a
30 Mar 2022	uComms	Boothby	801	33.9%	36.3%	11.4%	8.6%	4.8%	3%	—N/a	43%	57%	—N/a
30 Mar 2022	uComms	Sturt	809	38.4%	33%	11.3%	—N/a	5%	4.1%	—N/a	48%	52%	—N/a

== Tasmania ==
Date	Brand	Seat	Sample size	Primary vote						2PP vote		
Date	Brand	Seat	Sample size	Lib	ALP	GRN	ON	UAP	OTH	L/NP	ALP	IND
14 Apr – 7 May 2022	YouGov	Bass	—N/a	39%	36%	11%	3%	1%	10%	49%	51%	—N/a
14 Apr – 7 May 2022	YouGov	Braddon	—N/a	37%	31%	5%	7%	2%	18%	52%	48%	—N/a
14 Apr – 7 May 2022	YouGov	Clark	—N/a	15%	21%	9%	5%	2%	48%	—N/a	39%	61%
14 Apr – 7 May 2022	YouGov	Franklin	—N/a	28%	39%	17%	2%	3%	11%	37%	63%	—N/a
14 Apr – 7 May 2022	YouGov	Lyons	—N/a	34%	35%	9%	4%	3%	15%	46%	54%	—N/a
17, 21 March 2022	uComms	Braddon	829	34.7%	33.7%	5.4%	7.2%	2.2%	12.9%	47%	53%	—N/a
17, 21 March 2022	uComms	Senate	829	35.0%	31.6%	8.7%	4.9%	3.0%	14.3%	—N/a	—N/a	—N/a
4–6 Apr 2022	Redbridge	Bass	915	36%	36%	11%	6%	3%	9%	—N/a	—N/a	—N/a

== Victoria ==
Date	Brand	Seat	Sample size	Primary vote								2PP vote			
Date	Brand	Seat	Sample size	Lib	Nat	ALP	IND	GRN	ON	UAP	OTH	L/NP	ALP	IND	GRN
16 May 2022	uComms	Goldstein	831	34.0%	—N/a	12.5%	35.3%	8.9%	1.4%	1.8%	1.4%	41%	—N/a	59%	—N/a
13 May 2022	uComms	Higgins	836	36.9%	—N/a	29.8%	—N/a	19.9%	—N/a	—N/a	—N/a	46%	54%	—N/a	—N/a
14 Apr – 7 May 2022	YouGov	Aston	—N/a	52%	—N/a	29%		9%	3%	5%	2%	60%	40%	—N/a	—N/a
14 Apr – 7 May 2022	YouGov	Ballarat	—N/a	38%	—N/a	41%		10%	4%	2%	5%	46%	54%	—N/a	—N/a
14 Apr – 7 May 2022	YouGov	Bendigo	—N/a	31%	—N/a	41%		15%	5%	4%	4%	40%	60%	—N/a	—N/a
14 Apr – 7 May 2022	YouGov	Bruce	—N/a	32%	—N/a	47%		8%	4%	6%	3%	42%	58%	—N/a	—N/a
14 Apr – 7 May 2022	YouGov	Calwell	—N/a	26%	—N/a	50%		7%	4%	10%	3%	35%	65%	—N/a	—N/a
14 Apr – 7 May 2022	YouGov	Casey	—N/a	39%	—N/a	29%		10%	3%	5%	14%	52%	48%	—N/a	—N/a
14 Apr – 7 May 2022	YouGov	Chisholm	—N/a	38%	—N/a	39%		11%	2%	4%	6%	47%	53%	—N/a	—N/a
14 Apr – 7 May 2022	YouGov	Cooper	—N/a	22%	—N/a	45%		23%	2%	4%	4%	—N/a	66%	—N/a	34%
14 Apr – 7 May 2022	YouGov	Corangamite	—N/a	43%	—N/a	36%		10%	3%	4%	4%	50%	50%	—N/a	—N/a
14 Apr – 7 May 2022	YouGov	Corio	—N/a	29%	—N/a	43%		17%	3%	5%	3%	39%	61%	—N/a	—N/a
14 Apr – 7 May 2022	YouGov	Deakin	—N/a	43%	—N/a	33%		10%	2%	3%	9%	53%	47%	—N/a	—N/a
14 Apr – 7 May 2022	YouGov	Dunkley	—N/a	33%	—N/a	37%		10%	4%	8%	8%	46%	54%	—N/a	—N/a
14 Apr – 7 May 2022	YouGov	Flinders	—N/a	36%	—N/a	27%		6%	5%	4%	22%	52%	48%	—N/a	—N/a
14 Apr – 7 May 2022	YouGov	Fraser	—N/a	27%	—N/a	48%		13%	3%	7%	2%	35%	65%	—N/a	—N/a
14 Apr – 7 May 2022	YouGov	Gellibrand	—N/a	29%	—N/a	46%		13%	2%	7%	3%	37%	63%	—N/a	—N/a
14 Apr – 7 May 2022	YouGov	Gippsland	—N/a	—N/a	50%	27%		7%	5%	3%	8%	61%	39%	—N/a	—N/a
14 Apr – 7 May 2022	YouGov	Goldstein	—N/a	40%	—N/a	23%		10%	1%	2%	24%	48%	—N/a	52%	—N/a
14 Apr – 7 May 2022	YouGov	Gorton	—N/a	29%	—N/a	46%		9%	3%	7%	6%	37%	63%	—N/a	—N/a
14 Apr – 7 May 2022	YouGov	Hawke	—N/a	32%	—N/a	42%		8%	5%	4%	9%	40%	60%	—N/a	—N/a
14 Apr – 7 May 2022	YouGov	Higgins	—N/a	40%	—N/a	33%		21%	—N/a	1%	5%	47%	53%	—N/a	—N/a
14 Apr – 7 May 2022	YouGov	Holt	—N/a	33%	—N/a	45%		8%	2%	3%	9%	43%	57%	—N/a	—N/a
14 Apr – 7 May 2022	YouGov	Hotham	—N/a	32%	—N/a	50%		9%	2%	3%	4%	43%	57%	—N/a	—N/a
14 Apr – 7 May 2022	YouGov	Indi	—N/a	34%	—N/a	16%		3%	9%	4%	34%	47%	—N/a	53%	—N/a
14 Apr – 7 May 2022	YouGov	Isaacs	—N/a	36%	—N/a	39%		13%	2%	4%	6%	46%	54%	—N/a	—N/a
14 Apr – 7 May 2022	YouGov	Jagajaga	—N/a	37%	—N/a	40%		14%	2%	2%	5%	43%	57%	—N/a	—N/a
14 Apr – 7 May 2022	YouGov	Kooyong	—N/a	38%	—N/a	20%		11%	2%	1%	28%	47%	—N/a	53%	—N/a
14 Apr – 7 May 2022	YouGov	La Trobe	—N/a	41%	—N/a	33%		11%	5%	7%	3%	53%	47%	—N/a	—N/a
14 Apr – 7 May 2022	YouGov	Lalor	—N/a	31%	—N/a	46%		8%	3%	6%	6%	40%	60%	—N/a	—N/a
14 Apr – 7 May 2022	YouGov	Macnamara	—N/a	31%	—N/a	32%		24%	2%	1%	10%	41%	59%	—N/a	—N/a
14 Apr – 7 May 2022	YouGov	Mallee	—N/a	—N/a	37%	25%		7%	9%	5%	17%	56%	44%	—N/a	—N/a
14 Apr – 7 May 2022	YouGov	Maribyrnong	—N/a	28%	—N/a	47%		16%	1%	5%	3%	34%	66%	—N/a	—N/a
14 Apr – 7 May 2022	YouGov	McEwen	—N/a	35%	—N/a	39%		12%	6%	4%	4%	45%	55%	—N/a	—N/a
14 Apr – 7 May 2022	YouGov	Melbourne	—N/a	17%	—N/a	26%		43%	3%	3%	8%	—N/a	36%	—N/a	64%
14 Apr – 7 May 2022	YouGov	Menzies	—N/a	45%	—N/a	31%		9%	3%	7%	5%	59%	41%	—N/a	—N/a
14 Apr – 7 May 2022	YouGov	Monash	—N/a	40%	—N/a	29%		8%	8%	2%	13%	55%	45%	—N/a	—N/a
14 Apr – 7 May 2022	YouGov	Nicholls	—N/a	41%		19%		4%	13%	4%	19%	61%	39%	—N/a	—N/a
14 Apr – 7 May 2022	YouGov	Scullin	—N/a	24%	—N/a	55%		7%	3%	9%	2%	32%	68%	—N/a	—N/a
14 Apr – 7 May 2022	YouGov	Wannon	—N/a	46%	—N/a	27%		7%	5%	4%	11%	58%	42%	—N/a	—N/a
14 Apr – 7 May 2022	YouGov	Wills	—N/a	18%	—N/a	41%		29%	2%	6%	4%	—N/a	58%	—N/a	42%
2 May 2022	uComms	Goldstein	855	33%	—N/a	12.6%	33.1%	7.7%	1.8%	3.2%	1.9%	38%	—N/a	62%	—N/a
2 May 2022	uComms	Higgins	836	34.4		28.7%		20.3%	2.0%	—N/a	9.2%	46%	54%		
12 Apr 2022	uComms	Kooyong	847	35.5%	—N/a	12.8%	31.8%	11.7%	—N/a	—N/a	—N/a	41%	—N/a	59%	—N/a
13 Mar 2022		Nicholls	—N/a	20.2%	17%	15.2%	16.3%	5.4%	5.9%	4.1%	3.6%	—N/a	—N/a	—N/a	—N/a
28 Oct 2021	RedBridge	Kooyong	—N/a	25.9%	—N/a	—N/a	26.3%	—N/a	—N/a	—N/a	—N/a	—N/a	—N/a	—N/a	—N/a
28 Oct 2021	RedBridge	Goldstein	—N/a	28.5%	—N/a	—N/a	28.5%	—N/a	—N/a	—N/a	—N/a	—N/a	—N/a	—N/a	—N/a
28 Oct 2021	RedBridge	Flinders	—N/a	28.0%	—N/a	—N/a	24.3%	—N/a	—N/a	—N/a	—N/a	—N/a	—N/a	—N/a	—N/a

== Western Australia ==
Date	Brand	Seat	Sample size	Primary vote							2PP vote		
Date	Brand	Seat	Sample size	Lib	ALP	GRN	IND	ON	UAP	OTH	Lib	ALP	IND
16 May 2022	Utting Research	Curtin	514	38%	13%	9%	32%		3%	4%	48%	—N/a	52%
15–16 May 2022	YouGov	Pearce	411	40%	43%	4%	—N/a	1%	2%	9% (Note: Including 4% for the Western Australia Party)	47%	53%	—N/a
12–13 May 2022	Utting Research	Swan	—N/a	39%	38%	10%	—N/a	4%	3%	—N/a	47%	53%	—N/a
12–13 May 2022	Utting Research	Pearce	—N/a	32%	30%	12%	—N/a	7%	6%	—N/a	48%	52%	—N/a
12–13 May 2022	Utting Research	Hasluck	—N/a	39%	31%	10%	—N/a	9%	6%	—N/a	55%	45%	—N/a
12–13 May 2022	Utting Research	Tangney	—N/a	47%	35%	8%	—N/a	2%	2%	—N/a	54%	46%	—N/a
14 Apr – 7 May 2022	YouGov	Brand	—N/a	27%	46%	12%		7%	3%	5%	40%	60%	—N/a
14 Apr – 7 May 2022	YouGov	Curtin	—N/a	41%	24%	15%		3%	3%	14%	56%	44%	—N/a
14 Apr – 7 May 2022	YouGov	Burt	—N/a	28%	46%	13%		5%	2%	6%	38%	62%	—N/a
14 Apr – 7 May 2022	YouGov	Canning	—N/a	39%	33%	8%		6%	1%	13%	53%	47%	—N/a
14 Apr – 7 May 2022	YouGov	Cowan	—N/a	31%	46%	13%		5%	2%	3%	41%	59%	—N/a
14 Apr – 7 May 2022	YouGov	Durack	—N/a	46%	26%	10%		13%	2%	3%	61%	39%	—N/a
14 Apr – 7 May 2022	YouGov	Forrest	—N/a	47%	26%	13%		9%	1%	4%	60%	40%	—N/a
14 Apr – 7 May 2022	YouGov	Fremantle	—N/a	33%	43%	15%		3%	2%	4%	41%	59%	—N/a
14 Apr – 7 May 2022	YouGov	Hasluck	—N/a	39%	32%	13%		5%	5%	6%	52%	48%	—N/a
14 Apr – 7 May 2022	YouGov	Moore	—N/a	45%	32%	11%		3%	3%	6%	55%	45%	—N/a
14 Apr – 7 May 2022	YouGov	O'Connor	—N/a	50%	26%	10%		9%	1%	4%	61%	39%	—N/a
14 Apr – 7 May 2022	YouGov	Pearce	—N/a	39%	37%	12%		5%	2%	5%	48%	52%	—N/a
14 Apr – 7 May 2022	YouGov	Perth	—N/a	28%	42%	21%		3%	2%	4%	37%	63%	—N/a
14 Apr – 7 May 2022	YouGov	Swan	—N/a	34%	42%	13%		4%	3%	4%	43%	57%	—N/a
14 Apr – 7 May 2022	YouGov	Tangney	—N/a	46%	33%	11%		3%	2%	5%	55%	45%	—N/a
11–14 Mar 2022	Utting Research	Curtin	718	42%	20%	9%	24%	—N/a	2%	—N/a	51%	—N/a	49%
11–14 Mar 2022	Utting Research	Tangney	750	41%	41%	7%	—N/a	2%	2%	8%	50%	50%	—N/a
11–14 Mar 2022	Utting Research	Hasluck	750	37%	39%	7%	—N/a	4%	3%	10%	48%	52%	—N/a
11–14 Mar 2022	Utting Research	Pearce	750	34%	44%	5%	—N/a	5%	5%	7%	45%	55%	—N/a
11–14 Mar 2022	Utting Research	Swan	750	32%	46%	7%	—N/a	3%	5%	7%	41%	59%	—N/a

== See also ==
- Opinion polling for the 2022 Australian federal election
