= Opinion polling for the 2022 Australian federal election =

Australian opinion polling

In the lead-up to the 2022 Australian federal election, a number of polling companies conducted regular opinion polls for various news organisations. These polls collected data on parties' primary vote, and contained an estimation of the two-party-preferred vote. They also asked questions about the electorates' views on major party leaders. Key polling companies are YouGov, Essential Media Communications, Roy Morgan Research, and Resolve Strategic.

Ipsos polls used to be published in The Sydney Morning Herald, The Age and the Australian Financial Review; however following the shock result of the 2019 Australian federal election, when the Coalition won the election against all of the opinion polls' predictions, the Nine Entertainment group decided to discontinue its relationship with that company. The newspapers did not report any Ipsos political polling until 4 Apr 2022, but continued to report the results of other Ipsos polls.

== Graphical summary ==
Aggregate data of voting intention from all opinion polling since the last federal election. Local regression trends for each party, weighted by sample size, are shown as solid lines.

== Voting intention ==
=== Assessment of polling accuracy ===
Following the ‘polling failure’ of the 2019 Australian federal election, where all the major polling organisations’ final polls erroneously predicted a Labor victory, a great deal of attention was paid to changes in methodology and the accuracy of the polls at the 2022 election.

Post-election, several well-known psephologists undertook assessments of accuracy for the voting results produced by each major pollster’s final poll. These employed differing methods of assessment, but generally determined that the polling industry was more accurate overall than in 2019, though still tended to overstate Labor’s primary vote share.

William Bowe (The Poll Bludger) summed this up by saying, “The 2022 federal election was a much happier experience for the polling industry than 2019, with each of five pollster producing election eve primary vote numbers broadly suggestive of the actual result. However, there was a collective error in favour of Labor, whose actual primary vote came in 2.3% below the pollster consensus while the Coalition landed 0.4% higher”.

Psephologists Dr. Adrian Beaumont of The Conversation found Resolve Strategic’s final poll for the Nine newspapers to be the most accurate.

Dr. Kevin Bonham’s polling blog said YouGov (which conducts Newspoll) was the best poll in three of the five categories, and "made the most useful contributions to forecasting the result". Solely based on the final poll, he shared the honours between Resolve Strategic and Newspoll on the basis that the former performed better on three of the four measures in his analysis, but the latter performed better on the measure he considered to be more important.

=== 2022 ===
Date	Brand	Interview mode	Sample size	Primary vote							2pp vote	
Date	Brand	Interview mode	Sample size	L/NP	ALP	GRN	ONP	UAP	OTH	UND	L/NP	ALP
23 May–5 Jun 2022	ANU (Post-Exit Poll)	CATI/online	3556	31.9%	35.4%	19.8%	—N/a	—N/a	12.9% (Note: Includes ONP, UAP and independents)	—N/a	—N/a	—N/a
21 May 2022	Election			35.7%	32.6%	12.2%	5.0%	4.1%	10.4%	—	47.9%	52.1%
21–25 May 2022	Dynata (Exit Poll)	Online	1424	33%	41%	11%	4%	—N/a	11%	—N/a	—N/a	—N/a
13–19 May 2022	Newspoll-YouGov	Online	2188	35%	36%	12%	5%	3%	9%	—N/a	47%	53%
15–18 May 2022	Ipsos	Telephone/online	1996	35%	36%	13%	5%	3%	8%	—N/a	47%	53%
12–17 May 2022	Resolve Strategic	Telephone/online	2049	34.4%	31.3%	13.5%	5.8%	4.4%	10.5% (Note: 6% Independents, 4% Other)	—N/a	48.8%	51.2%
14–16 May 2022	Essential	Online	1600	36%	35%	9%	4%	3%	6% (Note: 6% Independents)	7%	46%	48%
9–15 May 2022	Roy Morgan	Telephone/online	1366	34%	34%	13%	4%	1%	14%	—N/a	47%	53%
10–13 May 2022	Newspoll-YouGov	Online	1532	35%	38%	11%	6%	3%	7%	—N/a	46%	54%
9 May 2022	Early voting begins											
2–8 May 2022	Roy Morgan	Telephone/online	1401	34%	35.5%	13%	4%	1%	12.5%	—N/a	45.5%	54.5%
4–7 May 2022	Newspoll-YouGov	Online	1523	35%	39%	11%	5%	4%	6%	—N/a	46%	54%
4–7 May 2022	Ipsos	Telephone/online	2311	29%	35%	12%	4%	3%	10%	7%	43%	57%
25 Apr–1 May 2022	Roy Morgan	Telephone/online	1487	35%	35%	13%	3%	1%	13%	—N/a	44.5%	55.5%
27–30 Apr 2022	Essential	Online	1500	36%	35%	10%	3%	4%	5%	6%	45%	49%
27–30 Apr 2022	Newspoll-YouGov	Online	1538	36%	38%	11%	5%	4%	6%	—N/a	47%	53%
27–30 Apr 2022	Resolve Strategic	Online	1408	33%	34%	15%	5%	5%	8%	—N/a	46%	54%
18–24 Apr 2022	Roy Morgan	Telephone/online	1393	35.5%	35%	12%	4.5%	1.5%	11.5%	—N/a	45.5%	54.5%
20–23 Apr 2022	Newspoll-YouGov	Online	1538	36%	37%	11%	3%	4%	9%	—N/a	47%	53%
20–23 Apr 2022	Ipsos	Telephone/online	2302	32%	34%	12%	4%	3%	8%	8%	45%	55%
19–20 Apr 2022	Essential	Online	1052	37%	35%	9%	3%	4%	5%	7%	46%	47%
11–17 Apr 2022	Roy Morgan	Telephone/online	1382	35.5%	35%	14%	4.5%	1.5%	9.5%	—N/a	45%	55%
14–17 Apr 2022	Newspoll-YouGov	Online	1510	35%	36%	12%	4%	4%	9%	—N/a	47%	53%
11–16 Apr 2022	Resolve Strategic	Online	1404	35%	34%	11%	4%	4%	13%	—N/a	—N/a	—N/a
10 Apr 2022	Australian federal election campaign begins with calling of 21 May election											
4–10 Apr 2022	Roy Morgan	Telephone/online	1384	32.5%	36%	12.5%	5%	1.5%	12.5%	—N/a	43%	57%
6–9 Apr 2022	Newspoll-YouGov	Online	1506	36%	37%	10%	3%	4%	10%	—N/a	47%	53%
31 Mar–3 Apr 2022	Resolve Strategic	Online	1681	34%	38%	11%	2%	3%	12%	—N/a	—N/a	—N/a
28 Mar–3 Apr 2022	Roy Morgan	Telephone/online	1367	33%	39.5%	11%	3.5%	1%	12%	—N/a	43%	57%
31 Mar–3 Apr 2022	Newspoll-YouGov	Online	1531	36%	38%	10%	3%	3%	10%	—N/a	46%	54%
30 Mar–2 Apr 2022	Essential	Online	1086	37%	36%	10%	4%	3%	5%	5%	45%	50%
30 Mar–2 Apr 2022	Ipsos	Telephone/online	2563	31%	35%	10%	4%	2%	8%	7%	42%	51%
21–27 Mar 2022	Roy Morgan	Online	1404	33%	35.5%	12.5%	3.5%	1%	14.5%	—N/a	44.5%	55.5%
14–16 Mar 2022	Essential	Online	1600	36%	35%	9%	4%	3%	6% (Note: 6% Independents)	7%	46%	48%
14–20 Mar 2022	Roy Morgan	Telephone/online	1418	31%	37.5%	12%	3%	1%	15.5%	—N/a	42%	58%
3–13 Mar 2022	Roy Morgan	Telephone/online	1947	33.5%	37%	11.5%	3%	1%	14% (Note: 10.5% Independents, 3.5% Other)	—N/a	44%	56%
9–12 Mar 2022	Newspoll-YouGov	Online	1520	35%	41%	8%	3%	3%	10%	—N/a	45%	55%
2–6 Mar 2022	Essential	Online	1093	36%	35%	10%	3%	3%	4%	7%	44%	49%
24 Feb–3 Mar 2022	Roy Morgan	Telephone/online	1141	34%	37.5%	11.5%	3.5%	1%	12.5% (Note: 9% Independents, 3.5% Other)	—N/a	43.5%	56.5%
23–26 Feb 2022	Newspoll-YouGov	Online	1525	35%	41%	9%	3%	4%	8%	—N/a	45%	55%
14–23 Feb 2022	Roy Morgan	Telephone/online	2261	32.5%	37.5%	12.5%	3.5%	1.5%	12.5% (Note: 8.5% Independents, 4% Other)	—N/a	43.5%	56.5%
15–20 Feb 2022	Resolve Strategic	Online	1604	33%	35%	10%	3%	4%	15%	—N/a	—N/a	—N/a
17–20 Feb 2022	Essential	Online	1089	35%	38%	9%	5%	3%	4%	6%	45%	49%
31 Jan–13 Feb 2022	Roy Morgan	Telephone/online	2796	33%	38.5%	11.5%	4%	1.5%	11.5%	—N/a	43%	57%
9–12 Feb 2022	Newspoll-YouGov	Online	1526	34%	41%	8%	3%	—N/a	14%	—N/a	45%	55%
2–6 Feb 2022	Essential	Online	1069	37%	35%	9%	4%	2%	5%	8%	46%	47%
27–30 Jan 2022	Newspoll-YouGov	Online	1523	34%	41%	11%	3%	—N/a	11%	—N/a	44%	56%
17–30 Jan 2022	Roy Morgan	Telephone/online	2783	33%	37.5%	11.5%	3.5%	2%	12.5%	—N/a	43.5%	56.5%
20–23 Jan 2022	Essential	Online	1062	36%	37%	8%	3%	—N/a	9%	8%	43%	50%
4–16 Jan 2022	Roy Morgan	Telephone/online	2791	34.5%	37%	12%	3%	0.5%	13%	—N/a	44%	56%
11–15 Jan 2022	Resolve Strategic	Online	1607	34%	35%	11%	3%	—N/a	17%	—N/a	—N/a	—N/a

=== 2019–2021 ===
Date	Brand	Interview mode	Sample size	Primary vote						2pp vote	
Date	Brand	Interview mode	Sample size	L/NP	ALP	GRN	ONP	OTH	UND	L/NP	ALP
8–13 Dec 2021	Essential	Online	1095	36%	36%	9%	4%	6%	8%	45%	47%
11–12, 18–19 Dec 2021	Roy Morgan	Telephone/online	—N/a	34.5%	37%	11.5%	4%	13%	—N/a	44.5%	55.5%
1–5 Dec 2021	Essential	Online	1094	38%	35%	10%	3%	7%	8%	45%	48%
27–28 Nov, 4–5 Dec 2021	Roy Morgan	Telephone/online	2805	34.5%	36%	12.5%	3.5%	13.5% (Note: 1% UAP, 12.5% Independents/Other)	—N/a	43.5%	56.5%
1–4 Dec 2021	Newspoll-YouGov	Online	1518	36%	38%	10%	3%	13%	—N/a	47%	53%
17–21 Nov 2021	Essential	Online	1095	36%	37%	10%	4%	7%	7%	45%	48%
17–21 Nov 2021	Resolve Strategic	Online	1781	39%	32%	11%	3%	14%	—N/a	—N/a	—N/a
13–14, 20–21 Nov 2021	Roy Morgan	Telephone/online	2795	35.5%	35.5%	12%	3.5%	13.5%	—N/a	44.5%	55.5%
10–13 Nov 2021	Newspoll-YouGov	Online	1524	37%	38%	11%	2%	12%	—N/a	47%	53%
3–7 Nov 2021	Essential	Online	1089	35%	37%	9%	3%	6%	10%	44%	46%
30–31 Oct, 6–7 Nov 2021	Roy Morgan	Telephone/online	2723	36.5%	35%	11.5%	3%	14%	—N/a	46.5%	53.5%
20–24 Oct 2021	Essential	Online	1781	37%	36%	10%	3%	8%	6%	44%	49%
20–24 Oct 2021	Resolve Strategic	Online	~1600	37%	34%	11%	3%	14%	—N/a	—N/a	—N/a
16–17, 23–24 Oct 2021	Roy Morgan	Telephone/online	2778	36.5%	35%	13.5%	3.5%	11.5%	—N/a	46%	54%
20–23 Oct 2021	Newspoll-YouGov	Online	1515	35%	38%	11%	3%	13%	—N/a	46%	54%
6–10 Oct 2021	Essential	Online	1097	36%	34%	9%	4%	8%	9%	45%	46%
2–3, 9–10 Oct 2021	Roy Morgan	Telephone/online	2794	37.5%	36%	11.5%	3%	12%	—N/a	47%	53%
29 Sep–2 Oct 2021	Newspoll-YouGov	Online	1545	37%	37%	11%	2%	13%	—N/a	47%	53%
22–26 Sep 2021	Essential	Online	1094	38%	36%	9%	3%	6%	6%	46%	48%
18–19, 25–26 Sep 2021	Roy Morgan	Telephone/online	2752	36%	36%	12.5%	3.5%	12%	—N/a	46%	54%
15–19 Sep 2021	Resolve Strategic	Online	1606	39%	31%	10%	4%	16%	—N/a	—N/a	—N/a
15–18 Sep 2021	Newspoll-YouGov	Online	2144	37%	38%	10%	3%	12%	—N/a	47%	53%
8–12 Sep 2021	Essential	Online	1100	38%	34%	8%	4%	8%	8%	46%	46%
4–5, 11–12 Sep 2021	Roy Morgan	Telephone/online	2735	39.5%	35%	13%	3%	10%	—N/a	47.5%	52.5%
25–29 Aug 2021	Essential	Online	1100	38%	36%	10%	4%	6%	7%	45%	48%
21–22, 28–29 Aug 2021	Roy Morgan	Telephone/online	2735	37.5%	38.5%	11.5%	3%	9.5%	—N/a	45.5%	54.5%
25–28 Aug 2021	Newspoll-YouGov	Online	1528	36%	40%	10%	3%	11%	—N/a	46%	54%
17–21 Aug 2021	Resolve Strategic	Online	1607	40%	32%	12%	2%	14%	—N/a	—N/a	—N/a
16 Aug 2021	Essential	Online	—N/a	37%	36%	9%	3%	6%	8%	45%	47%
7–8, 14–15 Aug 2021	Roy Morgan	Telephone/online	2747	37.5%	37.5%	12.5%	3.5%	9%	—N/a	46%	54%
4–7 Aug 2021	Newspoll-YouGov	Online	1527	39%	39%	11%	3%	8%	—N/a	47%	53%
2 Aug 2021	Essential	Online	—N/a	38%	35%	9%	4%	6%	8%	45%	47%
24–25, 31 Jul–1 Aug 2021	Roy Morgan	Telephone/online	2709	37%	37%	12.5%	3%	10.5%	—N/a	46.5%	53.5%
19 Jul 2021	Essential	Online	—N/a	37%	36%	10%	4%	6%	8%	45%	47%
10–11, 17–18 Jul 2021	Roy Morgan	Telephone/online	2737	39%	37%	11.5%	3%	9.5%	—N/a	47.5%	52.5%
13–17 Jul 2021	Resolve Strategic	Online	1607	38%	35%	12%	4%	12%	—N/a	—N/a	—N/a
14–17 Jul 2021	Newspoll-YouGov	Online	1506	39%	39%	10%	3%	9%	—N/a	47%	53%
5 Jul 2021	Essential	Online	—N/a	37%	36%	8%	4%	5%	8%	44%	48%
23–26 Jun 2021	Newspoll-YouGov	Online	1513	41%	37%	11%	3%	8%	—N/a	49%	51%
22 Jun 2021	Barnaby Joyce replaces Michael McCormack as National Party leader and Deputy Prime Minister										
21 Jun 2021	Essential	Online	—N/a	38%	36%	10%	4%	5%	7%	45%	47%
12–13, 19–20 Jun 2021	Roy Morgan	Telephone/online	2782	41.5%	34.5%	12%	3.5%	8.5%	—N/a	49.5%	50.5%
13 Jun 2021	Resolve Strategic	Online	1600	40%	36%	10%	3%	12%	—N/a	—N/a	—N/a
7 Jun 2021	Essential	Online	—N/a	38%	35%	10%	4%	7%	7%	44%	48%
29–30 May, 5–6 Jun 2021	Roy Morgan	Telephone/online	2817	40%	35.5%	11.5%	3%	10%	—N/a	49%	51%
2–5 Jun 2021	Newspoll-YouGov	Online	1516	41%	36%	11%	3%	9%	—N/a	50%	50%
24 May 2021	Essential	Online	—N/a	37%	35%	10%	3%	6%	8%	44%	48%
12–16 May 2021	Resolve Strategic	Online	1622	39%	35%	12%	2%	13%	—N/a	—N/a	—N/a
12–15 May 2021	Newspoll-YouGov	Online	1506	41%	36%	12%	2%	9%	—N/a	49%	51%
10 May 2021	Essential	Online	—N/a	38%	36%	9%	3%	6%	8%	44%	48%
26 Apr 2021	Essential	Online	—N/a	39%	34%	10%	4%	6%	7%	46%	46%
21–24 Apr 2021	Newspoll-YouGov	Online	1514	41%	38%	10%	3%	8%	—N/a	49%	51%
16 Apr 2021	Resolve Strategic	CATI/online	2000	38%	33%	12%	6%	11%	—N/a	—N/a	—N/a
12 Apr 2021	Essential	Online	—N/a	37%	36%	10%	3%	7%	7%	45%	48%
29 Mar 2021	Essential	Online	—N/a	39%	36%	8%	3%	7%	7%	46%	47%
24–27 Mar 2021	Newspoll-YouGov	Online	1517	40%	38%	11%	2%	9%	—N/a	48%	52%
15 Mar 2021	Essential	Online	—N/a	38%	34%	9%	3%	8%	7%	47%	47%
6–7, 13–14 Mar 2021	Roy Morgan	Telephone/online	2747	41%	34.5%	12.5%	2.5%	9.5%	—N/a	49.5%	50.5%
10–13 Mar 2021	Newspoll-YouGov	Online	1521	39%	39%	10%	3%	9%	—N/a	48%	52%
1 Mar 2021	Essential	Online	—N/a	37%	34%	9%	4%	8%	7%	45%	48%
17–20 Feb 2021	Newspoll-YouGov	Online	1504	42%	37%	10%	3%	8%	—N/a	50%	50%
15 Feb 2021	Essential	Online	—N/a	39%	35%	8%	4%	7%	6%	47%	47%
6–7, 13–14 Feb 2021	Roy Morgan	Telephone/online	2786	40%	34.5%	13%	3.5%	9%	—N/a	49.5%	50.5%
27 Jan–1 Feb 2021	Essential	Online	1092	37%	35%	10%	3%	7%	8%	44%	47%
27–30 Jan 2021	Newspoll-YouGov	Online	1512	42%	36%	10%	3%	9%	—N/a	50%	50%
18 Jan 2021	Essential	Online	—N/a	40%	33%	10%	3%	7%	7%	48%	45%
14 Dec 2020	Essential	Online	—N/a	37%	35%	8%	4%	7%	9%	45%	46%
30 Nov 2020	Essential	Online	—N/a	41%	33%	8%	4%	6%	8%	49%	43%
25–28 Nov 2020	Newspoll-YouGov	Online	1511	43%	36%	11%	2%	8%	—N/a	51%	49%
16 Nov 2020	Essential	Online	—N/a	38%	35%	9%	4%	6%	7%	45%	47%
14–15, 21–22 Nov 2020	Roy Morgan	Telephone/online	2824	42%	34%	12%	4%	8%	—N/a	50.5%	49.5%
4–7 Nov 2020	Newspoll-YouGov	Online	1510	43%	35%	11%	3%	8%	—N/a	51%	49%
2 Nov 2020	Essential	Online	—N/a	39%	35%	9%	3%	5%	9%	44%	46%
14–19 Oct 2020	Essential	Online	—N/a	39%	35%	9%	3%	7%	8%	48%	45%
12 Oct 2020	Essential	Online	—N/a	40%	33%	9%	3%	5%	9%	47%	44%
8–10 Oct 2020	Newspoll-YouGov	Online	1527	44%	34%	11%	3%	8%	—N/a	52%	48%
5 Oct 2020	Essential	Online	—N/a	39%	34%	9%	5%	6%	7%	47%	46%
21 Sep 2020	Essential	Online	—N/a	41%	31%	10%	4%	5%	9%	49%	42%
16–19 Sep 2020	Newspoll-YouGov	Online	2068	43%	34%	12%	3%	8%	—N/a	51%	49%
7 Sep 2020	Essential	Online	—N/a	38%	32%	10%	3%	9%	8%	45%	47%
26–29 Aug 2020	Newspoll-YouGov	Online	1507	41%	36%	11%	3%	9%	—N/a	50%	50%
24 Aug 2020	Essential	Online	—N/a	39%	35%	9%	4%	6%	7%	47%	45%
10 Aug 2020	Essential	Online	—N/a	38%	34%	9%	4%	5%	10%	46%	44%
8–9, 15–16 Aug 2020	Roy Morgan	Telephone/online	2841	46%	32.5%	11%	3%	7.5%	—N/a	54%	46%
5–8 Aug 2020	Newspoll-YouGov	Online	1509	43%	33%	11%	4%	9%	—N/a	52%	48%
23–26 Jul 2020	Essential	Online	1058	38%	35%	9%	4%	6%	8%	45%	47%
11–12, 18–19 Jul 2020	Roy Morgan	Telephone/online	2589	43.5%	33.5%	11%	2.5%	9.5%	—N/a	51.5%	48.5%
15–18 Jul 2020	Newspoll-YouGov	Online	1850	44%	34%	10%	4%	8%	—N/a	53%	47%
13 Jul 2020	Essential	Online	1054	37%	34%	10%	4%	6%	9%	45%	46%
29 Jun 2020	Essential	Online	1079	39%	33%	9%	4%	6%	8%	47%	45%
24–27 Jun 2020	Newspoll-YouGov	Online	1521	42%	35%	11%	3%	9%	—N/a	51%	49%
22 Jun 2020	Essential	Online	1079	39%	33%	10%	5%	6%	7%	48%	46%
13–14, 20–21 Jun 2020	Roy Morgan	Telephone/online	2593	42.5%	34.5%	10.5%	4%	8.5%	—N/a	50.5%	49.5%
15 Jun 2020	Essential	Online	1087	38%	35%	9%	5%	7%	7%	47%	47%
8 Jun 2020	Essential	Online	1073	40%	33%	9%	4%	6%	8%	47%	45%
3–6 Jun 2020	Newspoll-YouGov	Online	1512	42%	34%	12%	4%	8%	—N/a	51%	49%
13–16 May 2020	Newspoll-YouGov	Online	1504	43%	35%	10%	3%	9%	—N/a	51%	49%
18–19, 25–26 Apr 2020	Roy Morgan	Telephone/online	2806	43.5%	33%	11.5%	3%	9%	—N/a	51.5%	48.5%
22–25 Apr 2020	Newspoll-YouGov	Online	1519	41%	36%	12%	4%	7%	—N/a	50%	50%
1–3 Apr 2020	Newspoll-YouGov	Online	1508	42%	34%	13%	5%	6%	—N/a	51%	49%
11–14 Mar 2020	Newspoll-YouGov	Online	1501	40%	36%	12%	4%	8%	—N/a	49%	51%
27 Feb 2020	COVID-19 pandemic declared a national emergency										
19–22 Feb 2020	Newspoll-YouGov	Online	1513	38%	34%	13%	4%	11%	—N/a	49%	51%
20 Jan–3 Feb 2020	ANU	CATI/online	3249	34.8%	33.4%	14.7%	—N/a	10.5%	—N/a	—N/a	—N/a
4 Feb 2020	Adam Bandt replaces Richard Di Natale as Greens leader										
29 Jan–1 Feb 2020	Newspoll-YouGov	Online	1510	38%	35%	13%	4%	10%	—N/a	48%	52%
8–11 Jan 2020	Newspoll-YouGov	Online	1505	40%	36%	12%	4%	8%	—N/a	49%	51%
4–8 Dec 2019	Newspoll-YouGov	Online	1503	42%	33%	11%	5%	9%	—N/a	52%	48%
21–23 Nov 2019	Newspoll-YouGov	Online	1519	41%	33%	12%	5%	9%	—N/a	51%	49%
7–10 Nov 2019	Newspoll-YouGov	IVR/online	1682	40%	35%	12%	7%	6%	—N/a	50%	50%
17–20 Oct 2019	Newspoll-YouGov	IVR/online	1634	42%	33%	13%	6%	6%	—N/a	51%	49%
26–29 Sep 2019	Newspoll-YouGov	IVR/online	1658	42%	33%	13%	6%	6%	—N/a	51%	49%
5–7 Sep 2019	Newspoll-YouGov	IVR/online	1661	43%	35%	12%	5%	5%	—N/a	51%	49%
15–18 Aug 2019	Newspoll-YouGov	IVR/online	1623	42%	34%	11%	4%	9%	—N/a	51%	49%
25–28 Jul 2019	Newspoll-YouGov	IVR/online	1601	44%	33%	11%	3%	9%	—N/a	53%	47%
30 May 2019	Anthony Albanese replaces Bill Shorten as Labor leader										
18 May 2019	Election			41.44%	33.34%	10.4%	3.08%	11.74%	—	51.53%	48.47%

=== Polling for individual seats ===
Australian Capital Territory

Date	Brand	Seat	Sample size	Primary vote								2PP vote	
Date	Brand	Seat	Sample size	Lib	ALP	GRN	Pocock	Rubenstein	ON	UAP	OTH	Lib	ALP
6 May 2022	RedBridge	Senate	1064	25%	27%	11%	21%	6%	—N/a	6%	4%	—N/a	—N/a
14 Apr – 7 May 2022	YouGov	Bean	—N/a	24%	44%	11%	—N/a	—N/a	2%	2%	17%	37%	63%
14 Apr – 7 May 2022	YouGov	Canberra	—N/a	20%	46%	24%	—N/a	—N/a	1%	1%	8%	28%	72%
14 Apr – 7 May 2022	YouGov	Fenner	—N/a	30%	46%	18%	—N/a	—N/a	2%	2%	2%	36%	64%
6 Apr 2022	RedBridge	Senate	—N/a	25%	37%	14%	11%	—N/a	—N/a	—N/a	—N/a	—N/a	—N/a
6 Apr 2022	RedBridge	Senate	—N/a	24%	35%	15%	13%	—N/a	—N/a	—N/a	—N/a	—N/a	—N/a

New South Wales

Date	Brand	Seat	Sample size	Primary vote							2PP vote			
Date	Brand	Seat	Sample size	L/NP	ALP	IND	GRN	ON	UAP	OTH	L/NP	ALP	IND	GRN
17 May 2022	Laidlaw Campaigns	Fowler	618	—N/a	42%	—N/a	—N/a	—N/a	—N/a	—N/a	—N/a	45%	38%	—N/a
15 May 2022	Industry Association	Robertson	800	—N/a	—N/a	—N/a	—N/a	—N/a	—N/a	—N/a	42%	58%	—N/a	—N/a
15 May 2022	Industry Association	Reid	800	—N/a	—N/a	—N/a	—N/a	—N/a	—N/a	—N/a	47%	53%	—N/a	—N/a
15 May 2022	Industry Association	Parramatta	800	—N/a	—N/a	—N/a	—N/a	—N/a	—N/a	—N/a	46%	54%	—N/a	—N/a
15 May 2022	Industry Association	Gilmore	800	—N/a	—N/a	—N/a	—N/a	—N/a	—N/a	—N/a	44%	56%	—N/a	—N/a
15 May 2022	Industry Association	Shortland	800	—N/a	—N/a	—N/a	—N/a	—N/a	—N/a	—N/a	43%	57%	—N/a	—N/a
15 May 2022	Industry Association	Hunter	800	—N/a	—N/a	—N/a	—N/a	—N/a	—N/a	—N/a	49%	51%	—N/a	—N/a
15 May 2022	Industry Association	Lindsay	800	—N/a	—N/a	—N/a	—N/a	—N/a	—N/a	—N/a	57%	43%	—N/a	—N/a
3–14 May 2022	RedBridge	North Sydney	1267	33.3%	17.8%	23.5%	—N/a	—N/a	—N/a	—N/a	—N/a	—N/a	—N/a	—N/a
1–7 May 2022	RedBridge	Wentworth	1117	36.0%	11.7%	33.3%	6.2%	—N/a	5.3%	—N/a	—N/a	—N/a	—N/a	—N/a
6 May 2022	Compass Polling	North Sydney	507	40.5%	21.6%	13.6%	12.9%	3.0%	1.4%	6.1%	54%	46%	—N/a	—N/a
14 Apr – 7 May 2022	YouGov	Banks	—N/a	45%	38%	(Note: Independent primary votes are counted under the "other" column)	9%	2%	3%	3%	52%	48%	—N/a	—N/a
14 Apr – 7 May 2022	YouGov	Barton	—N/a	36%	49%		9%	2%	3%	3%	41%	59%	—N/a	—N/a
14 Apr – 7 May 2022	YouGov	Bennelong	—N/a	44%	40%		9%	2%	3%	2%	50%	50%	—N/a	—N/a
14 Apr – 7 May 2022	YouGov	Blaxland	—N/a	29%	50%		13%	3%	5%	—N/a	36%	64%	—N/a	—N/a
14 Apr – 7 May 2022	YouGov	Berowra	—N/a	50%	29%		12%	3%	1%	5%	58%	42%	—N/a	—N/a
14 Apr – 7 May 2022	YouGov	Bradfield	—N/a	49%	30%		11%	2%	3%	5%	58%	42%	—N/a	—N/a
14 Apr – 7 May 2022	YouGov	Calare	—N/a	43%	26%		5%	9%	6%	11%	60%	40%	—N/a	—N/a
14 Apr – 7 May 2022	YouGov	Chifley	—N/a	28%	50%		6%	4%	2%	10%	40%	60%	—N/a	—N/a
14 Apr – 7 May 2022	YouGov	Cook	—N/a	55%	29%		7%	4%	5%	—N/a	62%	38%	—N/a	—N/a
14 Apr – 7 May 2022	YouGov	Cowper	—N/a	42%	21%		7%	11%	2%	17%	68%	32%	—N/a	—N/a
14 Apr – 7 May 2022	YouGov	Cunningham	—N/a	29%	46%		15%	3%	6%	1%	37%	63%	—N/a	—N/a
14 Apr – 7 May 2022	YouGov	Dobell	—N/a	36%	42%		9%	4%	6%	3%	46%	54%	—N/a	—N/a
14 Apr – 7 May 2022	YouGov	Eden-Monaro	—N/a	35%	44%		7%	3%	2%	9%	43%	57%	—N/a	—N/a
14 Apr – 7 May 2022	YouGov	Farrer	—N/a	48%	21%		7%	9%	5%	10%	73%	27%	—N/a	—N/a
14 Apr – 7 May 2022	YouGov	Fowler	—N/a	28%	50%		7%	5%	6%	4%	38%	62%	—N/a	—N/a
14 Apr – 7 May 2022	YouGov	Gilmore	—N/a	39%	39%		11%	5%	2%	4%	47%	53%	—N/a	—N/a
14 Apr – 7 May 2022	YouGov	Grayndler	—N/a	20%	53%		20%	1%	1%	5%	—N/a	69%	—N/a	31%
14 Apr – 7 May 2022	YouGov	Greenway	—N/a	38%	44%		8%	3%	2%	5%	47%	53%	—N/a	—N/a
14 Apr – 7 May 2022	YouGov	Hughes	—N/a	42%	31%		6%	2%	5%	14%	56%	44%	—N/a	—N/a
14 Apr – 7 May 2022	YouGov	Hume	—N/a	47%	32%		6%	4%	5%	6%	59%	41%	—N/a	—N/a
14 Apr – 7 May 2022	YouGov	Hunter	—N/a	16%	42%		10%	16%	6%	10%	40%	60%	—N/a	—N/a
14 Apr – 7 May 2022	YouGov	Kingsford Smith	—N/a	35%	44%		15%	2%	4%	—N/a	41%	59%	—N/a	—N/a
14 Apr – 7 May 2022	YouGov	Lindsay	—N/a	40%	40%		8%	6%	3%	3%	50%	50%	—N/a	—N/a
14 Apr – 7 May 2022	YouGov	Lyne	—N/a	38%	28%		6%	6%	3%	19%	56%	44%	—N/a	—N/a
14 Apr – 7 May 2022	YouGov	Macarthur	—N/a	28%	51%		8%	7%	4%	2%	38%	62%	—N/a	—N/a
14 Apr – 7 May 2022	YouGov	Mackellar	—N/a	45%	20%		7%	3%	2%	23%	53%	—N/a	47%	—N/a
14 Apr – 7 May 2022	YouGov	Macquarie	—N/a	39%	40%		10%	3%	2%	6%	47%	53%	—N/a	—N/a
14 Apr – 7 May 2022	YouGov	McMahon	—N/a	35%	39%		7%	5%	5%	5%	44%	56%	—N/a	—N/a
14 Apr – 7 May 2022	YouGov	Mitchell	—N/a	50%	30%		10%	5%	3%	2%	59%	41%	—N/a	—N/a
14 Apr – 7 May 2022	YouGov	New England	—N/a	40%	21%		6%	10%	3%	20%	68%	32%	—N/a	—N/a
14 Apr – 7 May 2022	YouGov	Newcastle	—N/a	27%	50%		15%	3%	2%	3%	33%	67%	—N/a	—N/a
14 Apr – 7 May 2022	YouGov	North Sydney	—N/a	38%	30%		10%	2%	2%	18%	53%	47%	—N/a	—N/a
14 Apr – 7 May 2022	YouGov	Page	—N/a	37%	31%		9%	6%	2%	15%	52%	48%	—N/a	—N/a
14 Apr – 7 May 2022	YouGov	Parkes	—N/a	35%	32%		5%	7%	4%	17%	54%	46%	—N/a	—N/a
14 Apr – 7 May 2022	YouGov	Parramatta	—N/a	37%	47%		7%	3%	2%	4%	43%	57%	—N/a	—N/a
14 Apr – 7 May 2022	YouGov	Paterson	—N/a	30%	47%		7%	10%	3%	3%	42%	58%	—N/a	—N/a
14 Apr – 7 May 2022	YouGov	Reid	—N/a	37%	44%		11%	2%	3%	3%	44%	56%	—N/a	—N/a
14 Apr – 7 May 2022	YouGov	Richmond	—N/a	25%	32%		18%	3%	2%	20%	41%	59%	—N/a	—N/a
14 Apr – 7 May 2022	YouGov	Riverina	—N/a	41%	29%		6%	6%	5%	13%	59%	41%	—N/a	—N/a
14 Apr – 7 May 2022	YouGov	Robertson	—N/a	39%	39%		9%	5%	5%	3%	49%	51%	—N/a	—N/a
14 Apr – 7 May 2022	YouGov	Shortland	—N/a	28%	43%		11%	3%	5%	10%	40%	60%	—N/a	—N/a
14 Apr – 7 May 2022	YouGov	Sydney	—N/a	23%	51%		21%	1%	2%	2%	28%	72%	—N/a	—N/a
14 Apr – 7 May 2022	YouGov	Warringah	—N/a	32%	12%		5%	4%	2%	45%	41%	—N/a	59%	—N/a
14 Apr – 7 May 2022	YouGov	Watson	—N/a	29%	55%		7%	5%	4%	11%	35%	65%	—N/a	—N/a
14 Apr – 7 May 2022	YouGov	Wentworth	—N/a	48%	16%		5%	3%	2%	26%	56%	—N/a	44%	—N/a
14 Apr – 7 May 2022	YouGov	Werriwa	—N/a	36%	41%		7%	4%	5%	7%	47%	53%	—N/a	—N/a
14 Apr – 7 May 2022	YouGov	Whitlam	—N/a	23%	50%		12%	6%	5%	4%	36%	64%	—N/a	—N/a
28 Apr 2022	RedBridge	Parramatta	—N/a	26.4%	32.4%		10.7%	—N/a	7.2%	11.9%	45%	55%	—N/a	—N/a
28 Apr 2022	RedBridge	Wentworth	—N/a	36.6%	16.2%	24.3%	7.0%	—N/a	6.3%	5.3%	47%	—N/a	53%	—N/a
11–12 Apr 2022	Community Engagement	North Sydney	1114	37.4%	17.4%	19.4%	8.7%	—N/a	5.6%	—N/a	—N/a	—N/a	—N/a	—N/a
7 Apr 2022	uComms	Mackellar	833	35.2%	18.0%	23.9%	—N/a	—N/a	—N/a	—N/a	—N/a	—N/a	—N/a	—N/a
20–21 Mar 2022	KJC Research	Wentworth	1036	42%	14%	27%	9%	—N/a	3%	4%	49%	—N/a	51%	—N/a
28 Jan 2022	uComms	Wentworth	850	35.6%	18.6%	27.7%	7.5%	—N/a	—N/a	—N/a	44%	—N/a	56%	—N/a
28 Jan 2022	uComms	North Sydney	850	34.1%	22.9%	20%	11.2%	—N/a	—N/a	—N/a	—N/a	—N/a	—N/a	—N/a

Queensland

Date	Brand	Seat	Sample size	Primary vote						2PP vote		
Date	Brand	Seat	Sample size	LNP	ALP	GRN	ON	UAP	OTH	LNP	ALP	OTH
14 Apr – 7 May 2022	YouGov	Blair	—N/a	30%	36%	12%	11%	4%	7%	46%	54%	—N/a
14 Apr – 7 May 2022	YouGov	Bonner	—N/a	46%	32%	15%	4%	3%	—N/a	54%	46%	—N/a
14 Apr – 7 May 2022	YouGov	Bowman	—N/a	44%	32%	12%	6%	5%	1%	55%	45%	—N/a
14 Apr – 7 May 2022	YouGov	Brisbane	—N/a	36%	29%	28%	2%	3%	2%	46%	54%	—N/a
14 Apr – 7 May 2022	YouGov	Capricornia	—N/a	38%	27%	7%	16%	4%	8%	59%	41%	—N/a
14 Apr – 7 May 2022	YouGov	Dawson	—N/a	33%	30%	7%	19%	3%	8%	56%	44%	—N/a
14 Apr – 7 May 2022	YouGov	Dickson	—N/a	42%	30%	13%	4%	5%	6%	53%	47%	—N/a
14 Apr – 7 May 2022	YouGov	Fadden	—N/a	44%	26%	8%	8%	7%	7%	61%	39%	—N/a
14 Apr – 7 May 2022	YouGov	Fairfax	—N/a	45%	24%	15%	7%	4%	5%	58%	42%	—N/a
14 Apr – 7 May 2022	YouGov	Fisher	—N/a	42%	28%	15%	6%	6%	3%	55%	45%	—N/a
14 Apr – 7 May 2022	YouGov	Flynn	—N/a	33%	32%	5%	16%	8%	6%	54%	46%	—N/a
14 Apr – 7 May 2022	YouGov	Forde	—N/a	38%	30%	10%	9%	5%	8%	55%	45%	—N/a
14 Apr – 7 May 2022	YouGov	Griffith	—N/a	32%	36%	26%	3%	3%	—N/a	40%	60%	—N/a
14 Apr – 7 May 2022	YouGov	Groom	—N/a	48%	24%	8%	12%	2%	6%	64%	36%	—N/a
14 Apr – 7 May 2022	YouGov	Herbert	—N/a	38%	27%	7%	11%	4%	13%	56%	44%	—N/a
14 Apr – 7 May 2022	YouGov	Hinkler	—N/a	44%	27%	7%	14%	3%	5%	60%	40%	—N/a
14 Apr – 7 May 2022	YouGov	Kennedy	—N/a	27%	17%	7%	—N/a	6%	43%	38%	—N/a	62%
14 Apr – 7 May 2022	YouGov	Leichhardt	—N/a	35%	32%	12%	10%	5%	6%	51%	49%	—N/a
14 Apr – 7 May 2022	YouGov	Lilley	—N/a	38%	41%	13%	4%	1%	3%	46%	54%	—N/a
14 Apr – 7 May 2022	YouGov	Longman	—N/a	36%	38%	6%	11%	2%	7%	50%	50%	—N/a
14 Apr – 7 May 2022	YouGov	Maranoa	—N/a	52%	19%	4%	15%	5%	5%	73%	27%	—N/a
14 Apr – 7 May 2022	YouGov	McPherson	—N/a	42%	25%	17%	6%	6%	4%	56%	44%	—N/a
14 Apr – 7 May 2022	YouGov	Moncrieff	—N/a	48%	23%	9%	7%	7%	6%	64%	34%	—N/a
14 Apr – 7 May 2022	YouGov	Moreton	—N/a	36%	38%	18%	2%	4%	2%	44%	56%	—N/a
14 Apr – 7 May 2022	YouGov	Oxley	—N/a	33%	46%	12%	6%	3%	—N/a	42%	58%	—N/a
14 Apr – 7 May 2022	YouGov	Petrie	—N/a	44%	31%	10%	6%	7%	2%	56%	44%	—N/a
14 Apr – 7 May 2022	YouGov	Rankin	—N/a	28%	40%	12%	9%	7%	4%	42%	58%	—N/a
14 Apr – 7 May 2022	YouGov	Ryan	—N/a	40%	25%	24%	2%	3%	6%	50%	50%	—N/a
14 Apr – 7 May 2022	YouGov	Wide Bay	—N/a	45%	25%	8%	10%	2%	10%	59%	41%	—N/a
14 Apr – 7 May 2022	YouGov	Wright	—N/a	35%	22%	10%	20%	9%	4%	56%	44%	—N/a
28 Jan 2022	United Workers Union	Dickson	1200	40%	34%	10%	5%	5%	4%	51%	49%	—N/a

South Australia

Date	Brand	Seat	Sample size	Primary vote							2PP vote		
Date	Brand	Seat	Sample size	Lib	ALP	GRN	IND	ON	UAP	OTH	Lib	ALP	OTH
14 Apr – 7 May 2022	YouGov	Adelaide	—N/a	34%	43%	15%		3%	3%	2%	40%	60%	—N/a
14 Apr – 7 May 2022	YouGov	Barker	—N/a	48%	26%	6%		8%	6%	6%	62%	38%	—N/a
14 Apr – 7 May 2022	YouGov	Boothby	—N/a	37%	38%	11%		2%	1%	11%	47%	53%	—N/a
14 Apr – 7 May 2022	YouGov	Grey	—N/a	41%	29%	5%		12%	3%	10%	57%	43%	—N/a
14 Apr – 7 May 2022	YouGov	Hindmarsh	—N/a	34%	43%	13%		3%	3%	4%	42%	58%	—N/a
14 Apr – 7 May 2022	YouGov	Kingston	—N/a	28%	52%	9%		3%	3%	5%	36%	64%	—N/a
14 Apr – 7 May 2022	YouGov	Makin	—N/a	31%	50%	9%		3%	5%	2%	39%	61%	—N/a
14 Apr – 7 May 2022	YouGov	Mayo	—N/a	34%	20%	8%		8%	2%	28%	48%	—N/a	52%
14 Apr – 7 May 2022	YouGov	Spence	—N/a	28%	48%	9%		8%	4%	3%	38%	62%	—N/a
14 Apr – 7 May 2022	YouGov	Sturt	—N/a	42%	36%	15%		2%	2%	3%	50%	50%	—N/a
5 Apr 2022	uComms	Senate	1052	32.2%	36.1%	11.6%	8.2% (Note: 5.2% Nick Xenophon, 3.0% Rex Patrick)	3.9%	2.7%	3.2%	—N/a	—N/a	—N/a
30 Mar 2022	uComms	Boothby	801	33.9%	36.3%	11.4%	8.6%	4.8%	3%	—N/a	43%	57%	—N/a
30 Mar 2022	uComms	Sturt	809	38.4%	33%	11.3%	—N/a	5%	4.1%	—N/a	48%	52%	—N/a

Western Australia

Date	Brand	Seat	Sample size	Primary vote							2PP vote		
Date	Brand	Seat	Sample size	Lib	ALP	GRN	IND	ON	UAP	OTH	Lib	ALP	IND
16 May 2022	Utting Research	Curtin	514	38%	13%	9%	32%		3%	4%	48%	—N/a	52%
15–16 May 2022	YouGov	Pearce	411	40%	43%	4%	—N/a	1%	2%	9% (Note: Including 4% for the Western Australia Party)	47%	53%	—N/a
12–13 May 2022	Utting Research	Swan	—N/a	39%	38%	10%	—N/a	4%	3%	—N/a	47%	53%	—N/a
12–13 May 2022	Utting Research	Pearce	—N/a	32%	30%	12%	—N/a	7%	6%	—N/a	48%	52%	—N/a
12–13 May 2022	Utting Research	Hasluck	—N/a	39%	31%	10%	—N/a	9%	6%	—N/a	55%	45%	—N/a
12–13 May 2022	Utting Research	Tangney	—N/a	47%	35%	8%	—N/a	2%	2%	—N/a	54%	46%	—N/a
14 Apr – 7 May 2022	YouGov	Brand	—N/a	27%	46%	12%		7%	3%	5%	40%	60%	—N/a
14 Apr – 7 May 2022	YouGov	Curtin	—N/a	41%	24%	15%		3%	3%	14%	56%	44%	—N/a
14 Apr – 7 May 2022	YouGov	Burt	—N/a	28%	46%	13%		5%	2%	6%	38%	62%	—N/a
14 Apr – 7 May 2022	YouGov	Canning	—N/a	39%	33%	8%		6%	1%	13%	53%	47%	—N/a
14 Apr – 7 May 2022	YouGov	Cowan	—N/a	31%	46%	13%		5%	2%	3%	41%	59%	—N/a
14 Apr – 7 May 2022	YouGov	Durack	—N/a	46%	26%	10%		13%	2%	3%	61%	39%	—N/a
14 Apr – 7 May 2022	YouGov	Forrest	—N/a	47%	26%	13%		9%	1%	4%	60%	40%	—N/a
14 Apr – 7 May 2022	YouGov	Fremantle	—N/a	33%	43%	15%		3%	2%	4%	41%	59%	—N/a
14 Apr – 7 May 2022	YouGov	Hasluck	—N/a	39%	32%	13%		5%	5%	6%	52%	48%	—N/a
14 Apr – 7 May 2022	YouGov	Moore	—N/a	45%	32%	11%		3%	3%	6%	55%	45%	—N/a
14 Apr – 7 May 2022	YouGov	O'Connor	—N/a	50%	26%	10%		9%	1%	4%	61%	39%	—N/a
14 Apr – 7 May 2022	YouGov	Pearce	—N/a	39%	37%	12%		5%	2%	5%	48%	52%	—N/a
14 Apr – 7 May 2022	YouGov	Perth	—N/a	28%	42%	21%		3%	2%	4%	37%	63%	—N/a
14 Apr – 7 May 2022	YouGov	Swan	—N/a	34%	42%	13%		4%	3%	4%	43%	57%	—N/a
14 Apr – 7 May 2022	YouGov	Tangney	—N/a	46%	33%	11%		3%	2%	5%	55%	45%	—N/a
11–14 Mar 2022	Utting Research	Curtin	718	42%	20%	9%	24%	—N/a	2%	—N/a	51%	—N/a	49%
11–14 Mar 2022	Utting Research	Tangney	750	41%	41%	7%	—N/a	2%	2%	8%	50%	50%	—N/a
11–14 Mar 2022	Utting Research	Hasluck	750	37%	39%	7%	—N/a	4%	3%	10%	48%	52%	—N/a
11–14 Mar 2022	Utting Research	Pearce	750	34%	44%	5%	—N/a	5%	5%	7%	45%	55%	—N/a
11–14 Mar 2022	Utting Research	Swan	750	32%	46%	7%	—N/a	3%	5%	7%	41%	59%	—N/a

== Preferred prime minister ==
Preferred prime minister.

Satisfaction rating for prime minister Scott Morrison

Satisfaction rating for opposition leader Anthony Albanese

Aggregate data of voting intention from all opinion polling since the last election. Local regression trends for each rating are shown as solid lines.

Date	Firm	Interview mode	Sample size	Preferred Prime Minister			Morrison			Albanese		
Date	Firm	Interview mode	Sample size	Morrison	Albanese	Don't Know	Satisfied	Dissatisfied	Don't Know	Satisfied	Dissatisfied	Don't Know
13–19 May 2022	Newspoll-YouGov	Online	2188	42%	42%	16%	41%	54%	5%	41%	46%	13%
15–18 May 2022	Ipsos	Telephone/online	1996	39%	42%	19%	34%	51%	15%	33%	37%	30%
12–17 May 2022	Resolve Strategic	Telephone/online	2049	40%	36%	24%	—N/a	—N/a	—N/a	—N/a	—N/a	—N/a
10–13 May 2022	Newspoll-YouGov	Online	1532	43%	42%	15%	42%	53%	5%	38%	49%	13%
4–7 May 2022	Newspoll-YouGov	Telephone/online	1538	44%	42%	14%	41%	55%	4%	41%	47%	12%
4–7 May 2022	Ipsos	Telephone/Online	2311	36%	41%	24%	32%	51%	18%	30%	36%	34%
27–30 Apr 2022	Newspoll-YouGov	Telephone/online	1538	45%	39%	17%	44%	51%	5%	40%	49%	12%
20–23 Apr 2022	Newspoll-YouGov	Telephone/Online	1538	46%	37%	17%	42%	54%	4%	38%	50%	12%
20–23 Apr 2022	Ipsos	Telephone/Online	2302	38%	40%	22%	34%	48%	18%	31%	35%	34%
17–20 Apr 2022	Essential	Online	1052	40%	36%	24%	44%	48%	8%	41%	41%	17%
11–16 Apr 2022	Resolve Political Monitor	Online	1404	38%	30%	32%	44%	47%	9%	35%	44%	21%
6–9 Apr 2022	Newspoll-YouGov	Online	1506	44%	39%	17%	42%	54%	4%	42%	45%	13%
31 Mar–3 Apr 2022	Resolve Political Monitor	Online	1681	36%	37%	15%	39%	53%	8%	38%	42%	20%
31 Mar–3 Apr 2022	Newspoll	Online	1531	43%	42%	15%	42%	54%	4%	43%	44%	13%
31 Mar–2 Apr 2022	Ipsos	Telephone/Online	2563	37%	38%	25%	33%	48%	19%	30%	32%	38%
9–12 Mar 2022	Newspoll-YouGov	Online	1520	42%	42%	16%	41%	55%	4%	44%	42%	14%
23–26 Feb 2022	Newspoll-YouGov	Online	1525	42%	40%	18%	43%	55%	2%	44%	43%	13%
17–20 Feb 2022	Essential	Online	1089	40%	35%	25%	44%	49%	7%	43%	40%	17%
9–12 Feb 2022	Newspoll-YouGov	Online	1526	43%	38%	19%	40%	56%	4%	40%	46%	14%
27–30 Jan 2022	Newspoll-YouGov	Online	1523	43%	41%	16%	39%	58%	3%	43%	43%	14%
20–23 Jan 2022	Essential	Online	1001	42%	35%	23%	46%	46%	8%	39%	39%	22%
11–15 Jan 2022	Resolve Political Monitor	Online	1607	38%	31%	31%	41%	50%	9%	34%	41%	28%
1–4 Dec 2021	Newspoll-YouGov	Online	—N/a	45%	36%	19%	44%	52%	4%	39%	45%	16%
10–13 Nov 2021	Newspoll-YouGov	Online	—N/a	46%	38%	16%	44%	52%	4%	37%	48%	15%
20–23 Oct 2021	Newspoll-YouGov	Online	—N/a	48%	34%	18%	46%	50%	4%	37%	46%	17%
29 Sep–2 Oct 2021	Newspoll-YouGov	Online	1545	47%	34%	19%	48%	49%	3%	37%	47%	16%
15–18 Sep 2021	Newspoll-YouGov	Online	—N/a	47%	35%	18%	46%	50%	4%	37%	48%	15%
25–28 Aug 2021	Newspoll-YouGov	Online	1528	50%	34%	16%	49%	47%	4%	40%	47%	13%
4–7 Aug 2021	Newspoll-YouGov	Online	1527	49%	36%	15%	47%	49%	4%	38%	46%	16%
13–17 Jul 2021	Resolve Political Monitor	CATI/online	1600	45%	24%	31%	45%	46%	9%	30%	46%	24%
14–17 Jul 2021	Newspoll-YouGov	Online	1506	51%	33%	16%	51%	45%	4%	38%	46%	16%
6 Jul 2021	Essential	Online	1099	46%	28%	26%	51%	40%	9%	41%	35%	24%
23–26 Jun 2021	Newspoll-YouGov	Online	1513	53%	33%	14%	55%	41%	4%	40%	45%	15%
13 Jun 2021	Resolve Political Monitor	CATI/online	1600	46%	23%	31%	48%	41%	11%	31%	44%	25%
8 Jun 2021	Essential	Online	1104	48%	28%	24%	57%	36%	8%	39%	36%	24%
2–5 Jun 2021	Newspoll-YouGov	Online	1516	53%	32%	15%	54%	43%	3%	38%	47%	15%
12–16 May 2021	Resolve Political Monitor	CATI/online	1622	48%	25%	27%	—N/a	—N/a	—N/a	—N/a	—N/a	—N/a
12–15 May 2021	Newspoll-YouGov	Online	1506	55%	30%	15%	58%	38%	4%	39%	46%	15%
21–24 Apr 2021	Newspoll-YouGov	Online	1514	56%	30%	14%	59%	37%	4%	40%	43%	17%
16 Apr 2021	Resolve Political Monitor	CATI/online	2000	47%	25%	28%	—N/a	—N/a	—N/a	—N/a	—N/a	—N/a
12 Apr 2021	Essential	Online	1368	47%	28%	25%	54%	37%	9%	39%	34%	27%
24–27 Mar 2021	Newspoll-YouGov	Online	1517	52%	32%	16%	55%	40%	5%	42%	40%	18%
16, 30 Mar 2021	Essential	Online	1100	52%	26%	22%	57%	35%	8%	41%	32%	27%
10–13 Mar 2021	Newspoll-YouGov	Online	1521	56%	30%	14%	62%	34%	4%	42%	41%	17%
17–20 Feb 2021	Newspoll-YouGov	Online	1504	61%	26%	13%	64%	32%	4%	38%	45%	17%
27–30 Jan 2021	Newspoll-YouGov	Online	1512	57%	29%	14%	63%	33%	4%	41%	43%	16%
15 Dec 2020	Essential	Online	1071	50%	24%	26%	62%	28%	10%	43%	29%	28%
25–28 Nov 2020	Newspoll-YouGov	Online	1511	60%	28%	12%	66%	30%	4%	44%	41%	15%
4–6 Nov 2020	Newspoll-YouGov	Online	1510	58%	29%	13%	64%	31%	5%	43%	39%	18%
8–10 Oct 2020	Newspoll-YouGov	Online	1527	57%	28%	15%	65%	31%	4%	39%	43%	18%
16–19 Sep 2020	Newspoll-YouGov	Online	2068	59%	27%	14%	65%	31%	4%	39%	40%	21%
26–29 Aug 2020	Newspoll-YouGov	Online	1507	58%	29%	13%	64%	32%	4%	43%	41%	16%
6–9 Aug 2020	Essential	Online	1010	52%	22%	26%	66%	23%	11%	44%	30%	26%
5–8 Aug 2020	Newspoll-YouGov	Online	1509	60%	25%	15%	68%	29%	3%	41%	38%	15%
15–18 Jul 2020	Newspoll-YouGov	Online	1850	59%	26%	15%	68%	27%	5%	41%	40%	19%
9–12 Jul 2020	Essential	Online	1054	50%	27%	23%	63%	27%	10%	44%	28%	28%
24–27 Jun 2020	Newspoll-YouGov	Online	1521	58%	26%	16%	68%	27%	5%	42%	40%	18%
3–6 Jun 2020	Newspoll-YouGov	Online	1512	56%	26%	18%	66%	29%	5%	41%	38%	21%
2 Jun 2020	Essential	Online	1059	53%	23%	24%	65%	26%	9%	43%	30%	27%
13–16 May 2020	Newspoll-YouGov	Online	1504	56%	29%	15%	66%	30%	4%	44%	37%	19%
5 May 2020	Essential	Online	1093	50%	25%	25%	64%	27%	9%	42%	27%	31%
22–25 Apr 2020	Newspoll-YouGov	Online	1508	56%	28%	16%	68%	28%	4%	45%	34%	21%

== Sub-national polling ==
Some pollsters provided breakdowns of their polls by state, whilst others only poll a specific state. These results are listed by state below.

=== New South Wales ===
Date	Firm	Sample size	Primary vote							2PP vote	
Date	Firm	Sample size	L/NP	ALP	GRN	UAP	ONP	IND	OTH	L/NP	ALP
12–17 May 2022	Resolve Strategic	—N/a	39%	28%	14%	3%	6%	8%	2%	52.2%	47.8%
17 May 2022	Roy Morgan	—N/a	—N/a	—N/a	—N/a	—N/a	—N/a	—N/a	—N/a	48%	52%
10 May 2022	Roy Morgan	—N/a	—N/a	—N/a	—N/a	—N/a	—N/a	—N/a	—N/a	48.5%	51.5%
3 May 2022	Roy Morgan	—N/a	—N/a	—N/a	—N/a	—N/a	—N/a	—N/a	—N/a	44%	56%
30 Apr 2022	Resolve Strategic	—N/a	30%	41%	12%	3%	6%	4%	3%	41.6%	58.4%
27 Apr 2022	Roy Morgan	—N/a	—N/a	—N/a	—N/a	—N/a	—N/a	—N/a	—N/a	45%	55%
20 Apr 2022	Roy Morgan	—N/a	—N/a	—N/a	—N/a	—N/a	—N/a	—N/a	—N/a	46.5%	53.5%
16 Apr 2022	Resolve Strategic	—N/a	36%	35%	10%	3%	3%	11%	3%	48%	52%
11 Apr 2022	Roy Morgan	—N/a	—N/a	—N/a	—N/a	—N/a	—N/a	—N/a	—N/a	45%	55%
4 Apr 2022	Roy Morgan	—N/a	—N/a	—N/a	—N/a	—N/a	—N/a	—N/a	—N/a	45%	55%
3 Apr 2022	Resolve Strategic	—N/a	36%	36%	11%	5%	1%	8%	3%	47.2%	52.8%
29 Mar 2022	Roy Morgan	—N/a	—N/a	—N/a	—N/a	—N/a	—N/a	—N/a	—N/a	47%	53%
14-20 Mar 2022	Roy Morgan	—N/a	—N/a	—N/a	—N/a	—N/a	—N/a	—N/a	—N/a	42.5%	57.5%
14-23 Feb 2022	Roy Morgan	—N/a	—N/a	—N/a	—N/a	—N/a	—N/a	—N/a	—N/a	43.5%	56.5%
20 Feb 2022	Resolve Strategic	—N/a	34%	35%	8%	3%	3%	11%	7%	47.6%	52.4%
18 Feb 2022	Roy Morgan	—N/a	—N/a	—N/a	—N/a	—N/a	—N/a	—N/a	—N/a	41%	59%
12 Feb 2022	NSW by-elections in Monaro, Bega, Strathfield & Willoughby										
4–16 Jan 2022	Roy Morgan	—N/a	—N/a	—N/a	—N/a	—N/a	—N/a	—N/a	—N/a	42%	58%
15 Jan 2022	Resolve Strategic	—N/a	38%	36%	10%	2%	0%	11%	4%	47.9%	52.1%
27–28 Nov, 4–5 Dec 2021	Roy Morgan	—N/a	—N/a	—N/a	—N/a	—N/a	—N/a	—N/a	—N/a	44.5%	55.5%
13–14, 20–21 Nov 2021	Roy Morgan	—N/a	—N/a	—N/a	—N/a	—N/a	—N/a	—N/a	—N/a	44.5%	55.5%
20 Nov 2021	Resolve Strategic	—N/a	41%	29%	11%	3%	2%	12%	2%	53%	47%
24 Oct 2021	Resolve Strategic	—N/a	40%	34%	11%	2%	0%	10%	5%	49.6%	50.4%
5 Oct 2021	Gladys Berejiklian resigns as Premier of New South Wales										
18–19, 25–26 Sep 2021	Roy Morgan	—N/a	—N/a	—N/a	—N/a	—N/a	—N/a	—N/a	—N/a	46.5%	53.5%
19 Sep 2021	Resolve Strategic	—N/a	43%	31%	10%	3%	2%	6%	5%	46.6%	53.4%
14 Jul – 18 Sep 2021	Newspoll	2057	39%	38%	11%	—N/a	1%	—N/a	11%	48%	52%
4–5, 11–12 Sep 2021	Roy Morgan	—N/a	—N/a	—N/a	—N/a	—N/a	—N/a	—N/a	—N/a	46%	54%
21–22, 28–29 Aug 2021	Roy Morgan	—N/a	—N/a	—N/a	—N/a	—N/a	—N/a	—N/a	—N/a	47%	53%
22 Aug 2021	Resolve Strategic	—N/a	40%	31%	14%	—N/a	3%	9%	3%	50.8%	49.2%
7–8, 14–15 Aug 2021	Roy Morgan	—N/a	—N/a	—N/a	—N/a	—N/a	—N/a	—N/a	—N/a	48%	52%
24–25, 31 Jul – 1 Aug 2021	Roy Morgan	—N/a	—N/a	—N/a	—N/a	—N/a	—N/a	—N/a	—N/a	49%	51%
10–11, 17–18 Jul 2021	Resolve Strategic	—N/a	38%	33%	12%	—N/a	1%	—N/a	16%	49.3%	50.7%
10–11, 17–18 Jun 2021	Roy Morgan	—N/a	—N/a	—N/a	—N/a	—N/a	—N/a	—N/a	—N/a	49.5%	50.5%
21 Apr – 26 Jun 2021	Newspoll	1861	42%	37%	11%	—N/a	1%	—N/a	9%	50%	50%
13 Jun 2021	Resolve Strategic	—N/a	46%	32%	10%	—N/a	1%	—N/a	11%	54.3%	45.7%
29–30 May, 5–6 Jun 2021	Roy Morgan	—N/a	—N/a	—N/a	—N/a	—N/a	—N/a	—N/a	—N/a	49.5%	50.5%
12–16 May 2021	Resolve Strategic	—N/a	39%	36%	12%	—N/a	1%	—N/a	12%	48.2%	51.8%
16 Apr 2021	Resolve Strategic	—N/a	41%	29%	12%	—N/a	7%	—N/a	11%	53.5%	46.5%
27 Jan – 27 Mar 2021	Newspoll	1779	42%	36%	11%	—N/a	7%	—N/a	10%	50%	50%
6–7, 13–14 Feb 2021	Roy Morgan	2786	—N/a	—N/a	—N/a	—N/a	—N/a	—N/a	—N/a	54%	46%
26 Aug – 28 Nov 2020	Newspoll	2304	44%	36%	11%	—N/a	1%	—N/a	8%	51%	49%
14–15, 21–22 Nov 2020	Roy Morgan	2824	—N/a	—N/a	—N/a	—N/a	—N/a	—N/a	—N/a	53.5%	46.5%
8–9, 15–16 Aug 2020	Roy Morgan	2841	—N/a	—N/a	—N/a	—N/a	—N/a	—N/a	—N/a	56.5%	43.5%
3 Jun – 8 Aug 2020	Newspoll	457–2034	42%	37%	11%	—N/a	1%	—N/a	9%	49%	51%
11–12, 18–19 Jul 2020	Roy Morgan	2589	—N/a	—N/a	—N/a	—N/a	—N/a	—N/a	—N/a	52.5%	47.5%
11 Mar – 16 May 2020	Newspoll	472–1905	42%	36%	11%	—N/a	2%	—N/a	9%	50%	50%
7–8 Dec 2019	Newspoll	930–1472	42%	35%	10%	—N/a	2%	—N/a	12%	51%	45%
Election: 18 May 2019			42.54%	34.56%	8.71%	3.38%	1.31%	4.62%	4.88%	51.78%	48.22%

=== Victoria ===
Date	Firm	Sample size	Primary vote							2PP vote	
Date	Firm	Sample size	L/NP	ALP	GRN	ONP	UAP	IND	OTH	ALP	L/NP
12–17 May 2022	Resolve Strategic	—N/a	35%	32%	14%	3%	4%	6%	6%	52.1%	47.9%
17 May 2022	Roy Morgan	—N/a	—N/a	—N/a	—N/a	—N/a	—N/a	—N/a	—N/a	57%	43%
10 May 2022	Roy Morgan	—N/a	—N/a	—N/a	—N/a	—N/a	—N/a	—N/a	—N/a	61%	39%
3 May 2022	Roy Morgan	—N/a	—N/a	—N/a	—N/a	—N/a	—N/a	—N/a	—N/a	63.5%	36.5%
30 Apr 2022	Resolve Strategic	—N/a	30%	35%	16%	5%	7%	4%	3%	56%	44%
27 Apr 2022	Roy Morgan	—N/a	—N/a	—N/a	—N/a	—N/a	—N/a	—N/a	—N/a	60%	40%
20 Apr 2022	Roy Morgan	—N/a	—N/a	—N/a	—N/a	—N/a	—N/a	—N/a	—N/a	58%	42%
16 Apr 2022	Resolve Strategic	—N/a	35%	32%	12%	1%	7%	7%	6%	51.3%	48.7%
11 Apr 2022	Roy Morgan	—N/a	—N/a	—N/a	—N/a	—N/a	—N/a	—N/a	—N/a	58%	42%
4 Apr 2022	Roy Morgan	—N/a	—N/a	—N/a	—N/a	—N/a	—N/a	—N/a	—N/a	60.5%	39.5%
3 Apr 2022	Resolve Strategic	—N/a	34%	36%	11%	1%	5%	9%	3%	51.8%	48.2%
29 Apr 2022	Roy Morgan	—N/a	—N/a	—N/a	—N/a	—N/a	—N/a	—N/a	—N/a	60%	40%
14-20 Mar 2022	Roy Morgan	—N/a	—N/a	—N/a	—N/a	—N/a	—N/a	—N/a	—N/a	64%	36%
14-23 Feb 2022	Roy Morgan	—N/a	—N/a	—N/a	—N/a	—N/a	—N/a	—N/a	—N/a	60%	40%
20 Feb 2022	Resolve Strategic	—N/a	31%	31%	11%	0%	7%	13%	6%	52.7%	47.3%
18 Feb 2022	Roy Morgan	—N/a	—N/a	—N/a	—N/a	—N/a	—N/a	—N/a	—N/a	57.5%	42.5%
4–16 Jan 2022	Roy Morgan	—N/a	—N/a	—N/a	—N/a	—N/a	—N/a	—N/a	—N/a	59%	41%
15 Jan 2022	Resolve Strategic	—N/a	29%	40%	11%	1%	4%	10%	4%	58.6%	41.4%
27–28 Nov, 4–5 Dec 2021	Roy Morgan	—N/a	—N/a	—N/a	—N/a	—N/a	—N/a	—N/a	—N/a	58.5%	41.5%
13–14, 20–21 Nov 2021	Roy Morgan	—N/a	—N/a	—N/a	—N/a	—N/a	—N/a	—N/a	—N/a	58%	42%
20 Nov 2021	Resolve Strategic	—N/a	37%	35%	12%	0%	5%	8%	5%	52.3%	47.7%
30–31 Oct, 6–7 Nov 2021	Roy Morgan	—N/a	—N/a	—N/a	—N/a	—N/a	—N/a	—N/a	—N/a	55%	45%
24 Oct 2021	Resolve Strategic	—N/a	36%	33%	13%	1%	4%	12%	5%	52.1%	47.9%
19 Sep 2021	Resolve Strategic	—N/a	38%	33%	11%	2%	2%	10%	5%	50.6%	49.4%
Jul – Sep 2021	Resolve Strategic	—N/a	37%	35%	11%	1%	—N/a	—N/a	15%	51.9%	48.1%
22 Aug 2021	Resolve Strategic	—N/a	39%	33%	13%	0%	—N/a	11%	5%	50.7%	49.3%
18–19, 25–26 Sep 2021	Roy Morgan	—N/a	—N/a	—N/a	—N/a	—N/a	—N/a	—N/a	—N/a	56%	44%
14 Jul – 18 Sep 2021	Newspoll	1731	35%	42%	12%	0%	—N/a	—N/a	11%	58%	42%
4–5, 11–12 Sep 2021	Roy Morgan	—N/a	—N/a	—N/a	—N/a	—N/a	—N/a	—N/a	—N/a	57%	43%
21–22, 28–29 Aug 2021	Roy Morgan	—N/a	—N/a	—N/a	—N/a	—N/a	—N/a	—N/a	—N/a	59.5%	40.5%
7–8, 14–15 Aug 2021	Roy Morgan	—N/a	—N/a	—N/a	—N/a	—N/a	—N/a	—N/a	—N/a	60%	40%
24–25, 31 Jul – 1 Aug 2021	Roy Morgan	—N/a	—N/a	—N/a	—N/a	—N/a	—N/a	—N/a	—N/a	59.5%	40.5%
10–11, 17–18 Jul 2021	Resolve Strategic	—N/a	34%	40%	11%	0%	—N/a	—N/a	13%	56.3%	43.7%
10–11, 17–18 Jun 2021	Roy Morgan	—N/a	—N/a	—N/a	—N/a	—N/a	—N/a	—N/a	—N/a	56.5%	43.5%
21 Apr – 26 Jun 2021	Newspoll	1536	40%	37%	13%	1%	—N/a	—N/a	9%	53%	47%
13 Jun 2021	Resolve Strategic	—N/a	37%	37%	10%	1%	—N/a	—N/a	15%	52.6%	47.6%
29–30 May, 5–6 Jun 2021	Roy Morgan	—N/a	—N/a	—N/a	—N/a	—N/a	—N/a	—N/a	—N/a	53.5%	46.5%
12–16 May 2021	Resolve Strategic	—N/a	41%	34%	12%	0%	—N/a	—N/a	13%	50%	50%
16 Apr 2021	Resolve Strategic	—N/a	33%	34%	12%	6%	—N/a	—N/a	14%	52%	48%
27 Jan – 27 Mar 2021	Newspoll	1506	40%	39%	10%	1%	—N/a	—N/a	10%	53%	47%
6–7, 13–14 Feb 2021	Roy Morgan	2786	—N/a	—N/a	—N/a	—N/a	—N/a	—N/a	—N/a	55%	45%
26 Aug – 28 Nov 2020	Newspoll	2160	39%	39%	14%	0%	—N/a	—N/a	8%	55%	45%
14–15, 21–22 Nov 2020	Roy Morgan	2824	—N/a	—N/a	—N/a	—N/a	—N/a	—N/a	—N/a	53.5%	46.5%
8–9, 15–16 Aug 2020	Roy Morgan	2841	—N/a	—N/a	—N/a	—N/a	—N/a	—N/a	—N/a	52%	48%
3 Jun – 8 Aug 2020	Newspoll	457–2034	37%	40%	14%	1%	—N/a	—N/a	8%	56%	44%
11–12, 18–19 Jul 2020	Roy Morgan	2589	—N/a	—N/a	—N/a	—N/a	—N/a	—N/a	—N/a	53.5%	46.5%
11 Mar – 16 May 2020	Newspoll	472–1905	39%	40%	13%	1%	—N/a	—N/a	7%	55%	45%
7–8 Dec 2019	Newspoll	930–1472	40%	38%	12%	1%	—N/a	—N/a	11%	53%	47%
Election: 18 May 2019			38.58%	36.86%	11.89%	0.95%	3.64%	3.90%	4.%	53.14%	46.86%

=== Queensland ===
Date	Firm	Sample size	Primary vote							2PP vote	
Date	Firm	Sample size	LNP	ALP	GRN	ONP	UAP	IND	OTH	L/NP	ALP
12–17 May 2022	Resolve Strategic	—N/a	31%	28%	17%	11%	6%	4%	3%	48.5%	51.5%
17 May 2022	Roy Morgan	—N/a	—N/a	—N/a	—N/a	—N/a	—N/a	—N/a	—N/a	53%	47%
10 May 2022	Roy Morgan	—N/a	—N/a	—N/a	—N/a	—N/a	—N/a	—N/a	—N/a	53.5%	46.5%
3 May 2022	Roy Morgan	—N/a	—N/a	—N/a	—N/a	—N/a	—N/a	—N/a	—N/a	56.5%	43.5%
30 Apr 2022	Resolve Strategic	—N/a	41%	27%	18%	5%	6%	2%	2%	52.7%	47.3%
27 Apr 2022	Roy Morgan	—N/a	—N/a	—N/a	—N/a	—N/a	—N/a	—N/a	—N/a	54.5%	45.5%
20 Apr 2022	Roy Morgan	—N/a	—N/a	—N/a	—N/a	—N/a	—N/a	—N/a	—N/a	48.5%	51.5%
16 Apr 2022	Resolve Strategic	—N/a	34%	31%	13%	10%	2%	10%	1%	49%	51%
11 Apr 2022	Roy Morgan	—N/a	—N/a	—N/a	—N/a	—N/a	—N/a	—N/a	—N/a	49.5%	50.5%
4 Apr 2022	Roy Morgan	—N/a	—N/a	—N/a	—N/a	—N/a	—N/a	—N/a	—N/a	49.5%	50.5%
3 Apr 2022	Resolve Strategic	—N/a	33%	33%	14%	5%	2%	11%	2%	46.4%	53.6%
29 Mar 2022	Roy Morgan	—N/a	—N/a	—N/a	—N/a	—N/a	—N/a	—N/a	—N/a	51%	49%
14-20 Mar 2022	Roy Morgan	—N/a	—N/a	—N/a	—N/a	—N/a	—N/a	—N/a	—N/a	54.5%	45.5%
14-23 Feb 2022	Roy Morgan	—N/a	—N/a	—N/a	—N/a	—N/a	—N/a	—N/a	—N/a	50%	50%
20 Feb 2022	Resolve Strategic	—N/a	33%	33%	13%	9%	3%	7%	2%	46.4%	53.6%
18 Feb 2022	Roy Morgan	—N/a	—N/a	—N/a	—N/a	—N/a	—N/a	—N/a	—N/a	48.5%	51.5%
4–16 Jan 2022	Roy Morgan	—N/a	—N/a	—N/a	—N/a	—N/a	—N/a	—N/a	—N/a	51.5%	48.5%
15 Jan 2022	Resolve Strategic	—N/a	34%	26%	15%	13%	3%	7%	2%	51.4%	48.6%
27–28 Nov, 4–5 Dec 2021	Roy Morgan	—N/a	—N/a	—N/a	—N/a	—N/a	—N/a	—N/a	—N/a	45.5%	54.5%
13–14, 20–21 Nov 2021	Roy Morgan	—N/a	—N/a	—N/a	—N/a	—N/a	—N/a	—N/a	—N/a	48.5%	51.5%
20 Nov 2021	Resolve Strategic	—N/a	42%	30%	10%	8%	2%	6%	1%	54.2%	45.8%
30–31 Oct, 6–7 Nov 2021	Roy Morgan	—N/a	—N/a	—N/a	—N/a	—N/a	—N/a	—N/a	—N/a	53%	47%
24 Oct 2021	Resolve Strategic	—N/a	36%	33%	11%	11%	3%	4%	5%	49.9%	50.1%
19 Sep 2021	Resolve Strategic	—N/a	38%	32%	10%	10%	4%	5%	1%	51.8%	48.2%
Jul – Sep 2021	Resolve Strategic	—N/a	42%	28%	10%	11%	—N/a	—N/a	9%	55.7%	44.3%
22 Aug 2021	Resolve Strategic	—N/a	45%	26%	12%	7%	—N/a	8%	3%	57%	43%
18–19, 25–26 Sep 2021	Roy Morgan	—N/a	—N/a	—N/a	—N/a	—N/a	—N/a	—N/a	—N/a	52.5%	47.5%
14 Jul – 18 Sep 2021	Newspoll	1536	42%	33%	9%	8%	—N/a	—N/a	8%	55%	45%
4–5, 11–12 Sep 2021	Roy Morgan	—N/a	—N/a	—N/a	—N/a	—N/a	—N/a	—N/a	—N/a	54%	46%
21–22, 28–29 Aug 2021	Roy Morgan	—N/a	—N/a	—N/a	—N/a	—N/a	—N/a	—N/a	—N/a	53.5%	46.5%
7–8, 14–15 Aug 2021	Roy Morgan	—N/a	—N/a	—N/a	—N/a	—N/a	—N/a	—N/a	—N/a	52%	48%
24–25, 31 Jul – 1 Aug 2021	Roy Morgan	—N/a	—N/a	—N/a	—N/a	—N/a	—N/a	—N/a	—N/a	52%	48%
10–11, 17–18 Jul 2021	Resolve Strategic	—N/a	43%	26%	9%	15%	—N/a	—N/a	6%	58.1%	41.9%
10–11, 17–18 Jun 2021	Roy Morgan	—N/a	—N/a	—N/a	—N/a	—N/a	—N/a	—N/a	—N/a	51.5%	48.5%
21 Apr – 26 Jun 2021	Newspoll	1249	42%	33%	11%	7%	—N/a	—N/a	7%	53%	47%
13 Jun 2021	Resolve Strategic	—N/a	38%	35%	10%	7%	—N/a	—N/a	10%	49.6%	50.4%
29–30 May, 5–6 Jun 2021	Roy Morgan	—N/a	—N/a	—N/a	—N/a	—N/a	—N/a	—N/a	—N/a	53%	47%
12–16 May 2021	Resolve Strategic	—N/a	41%	30%	12%	7%	—N/a	—N/a	11%	53%	47%
16 Apr 2021	Resolve Strategic	—N/a	38%	30%	11%	8%	—N/a	—N/a	11%	52%	48%
27 Jan – 27 Mar 2021	Newspoll	1276	42%	35%	10%	8%	—N/a	—N/a	5%	53%	47%
6–7, 13–14 Feb 2021	Roy Morgan	2786	—N/a	—N/a	—N/a	—N/a	—N/a	—N/a	—N/a	52%	48%
26 Aug – 28 Nov 2020	Newspoll	1879	45%	29%	12%	9%	—N/a	—N/a	5%	57%	43%
14–15, 21–22 Nov 2020	Roy Morgan	2824	—N/a	—N/a	—N/a	—N/a	—N/a	—N/a	—N/a	54.5%	48.5%
31 Oct 2020	Annastacia Palaszczuk (Labor) wins the 2020 Queensland state election										
8–9, 15–16 Aug 2020	Roy Morgan	2841	—N/a	—N/a	—N/a	—N/a	—N/a	—N/a	—N/a	60%	40%
3 Jun – 8 Aug 2020	Newspoll	457–2034	46%	27%	10%	11%	—N/a	—N/a	6%	59%	41%
11–12, 18–19 Jul 2020	Roy Morgan	2589	—N/a	—N/a	—N/a	—N/a	—N/a	—N/a	—N/a	58%	42%
11 Mar – 16 May 2020	Newspoll	472–1905	42%	28%	13%	11%	—N/a	—N/a	6%	56%	44%
7–8 Dec 2019	Newspoll	930–1472	40%	29%	12%	13%	—N/a	—N/a	6%	55%	45%
1 Sep 2019	YouGov Galaxy		40%	29%	12%	13%	—N/a	—N/a	6%	55%	45%
Election: 18 May 2019			43.70%	26.68%	10.32%	8.86%	3.51%	1.27%	5.66%	58.44%	41.56%

=== Western Australia ===
Date	Firm	Sample size	Primary vote					2PP vote	
Date	Firm	Sample size	LNP	ALP	GRN	ONP	OTH	L/NP	ALP
17 May 2022	Roy Morgan	—N/a	—N/a	—N/a	—N/a	—N/a	—N/a	45.5%	54.5%
10 May 2022	Roy Morgan	—N/a	—N/a	—N/a	—N/a	—N/a	—N/a	42.5%	57.5%
3 May 2022	Roy Morgan	—N/a	—N/a	—N/a	—N/a	—N/a	—N/a	51%	49%
27 Apr 2022	Roy Morgan	—N/a	—N/a	—N/a	—N/a	—N/a	—N/a	54.5%	45.5%
20 Apr 2022	Roy Morgan	—N/a	—N/a	—N/a	—N/a	—N/a	—N/a	51%	49%
11 Apr 2022	Roy Morgan	—N/a	—N/a	—N/a	—N/a	—N/a	—N/a	36.5%	63.5%
4 Apr 2022	Roy Morgan	—N/a	—N/a	—N/a	—N/a	—N/a	—N/a	41%	59%
29 Mar 2022	Roy Morgan	—N/a	—N/a	—N/a	—N/a	—N/a	—N/a	43%	57%
14-20 Mar 2022	Roy Morgan	—N/a	—N/a	—N/a	—N/a	—N/a	—N/a	41%	59%
14-23 Feb 2022	Roy Morgan	—N/a	—N/a	—N/a	—N/a	—N/a	—N/a	48%	52%
18 Feb 2022	Roy Morgan	—N/a	—N/a	—N/a	—N/a	—N/a	—N/a	46.5%	53.5%
4–16 Jan 2022	Roy Morgan	—N/a	—N/a	—N/a	—N/a	—N/a	—N/a	49%	51%
27–28 Nov, 4–5 Dec 2021	Roy Morgan	—N/a	—N/a	—N/a	—N/a	—N/a	—N/a	49.5%	50.5%
13–14, 20–21 Nov 2021	Roy Morgan	—N/a	—N/a	—N/a	—N/a	—N/a	—N/a	46.5%	53.5%
30–31 Oct, 6–7 Nov 2021	Roy Morgan	—N/a	—N/a	—N/a	—N/a	—N/a	—N/a	46.5%	53.5%
18–19, 25–26 Sep 2021	Roy Morgan	—N/a	—N/a	—N/a	—N/a	—N/a	—N/a	45.5%	54.5%
14 Jul – 18 Sep 2021	Newspoll	602	37%	42%	10%	5%	6%	46%	54%
4–5, 11–12 Sep 2021	Roy Morgan	—N/a	—N/a	—N/a	—N/a	—N/a	—N/a	53%	47%
21–22, 28–29 Aug 2021	Roy Morgan	—N/a	—N/a	—N/a	—N/a	—N/a	—N/a	49%	51%
7–8, 14–15 Aug 2021	Roy Morgan	—N/a	—N/a	—N/a	—N/a	—N/a	—N/a	45.5%	54.5%
24–25, 31 July–1 Aug 2021	Roy Morgan	—N/a	—N/a	—N/a	—N/a	—N/a	—N/a	51.5%	48.5%
10–11, 17–18 Jul 2021	Resolve Strategic	—N/a	33%	39%	21%	2%	6%	40.8%	59.2%
10–11, 17–18 Jun 2021	Roy Morgan	—N/a	—N/a	—N/a	—N/a	—N/a	—N/a	47.5%	52.5%
21 Apr – 26 Jun 2021	Newspoll	625	39%	41%	10%	5%	5%	47%	53%
13 Jun 2021	Resolve Strategic	—N/a	33%	40%	15%	4%	8%	42.5%	57.5%
29–30 May, 5–6 Jun 2021	Roy Morgan	—N/a	—N/a	—N/a	—N/a	—N/a	—N/a	51%	49%
12–16 May 2021	Resolve Strategic	—N/a	44%	38%	11%	3%	3%	49.9%	50.1%
16 Apr 2021	Resolve Strategic	—N/a	42%	40%	13%	5%	1%	47.5%	52.5%
27 Jan – 27 Mar 2021	Newspoll	628	40%	42%	10%	4%	4%	47%	53%
Mark McGowan wins the 2021 Western Australian state election in a landslide
6–7, 13–14 Feb 2021	Roy Morgan	2786	—N/a	—N/a	—N/a	—N/a	—N/a	49.5%	50.5%
26 Aug – 28 Nov 2020	Newspoll	779	43%	32%	13%	7%	5%	53%	47%
14–15, 21–22 Nov 2020	Roy Morgan	2824	—N/a	—N/a	—N/a	—N/a	—N/a	51%	49%
8–9, 15–16 Aug 2020	Roy Morgan	2841	—N/a	—N/a	—N/a	—N/a	—N/a	53.5%	46.5%
3 Jun – 8 Aug 2020	Newspoll	457–2034	45%	31%	13%	8%	3%	54%	46%
11–12, 18–19 Jul 2020	Roy Morgan	2589	—N/a	—N/a	—N/a	—N/a	—N/a	53.5%	46.5%
11 Mar – 16 May 2020	Newspoll	472–1905	44%	31%	12%	9%	4%	55%	45%
Election: 18 May 2019			43.79%	29.80%	11.62%	5.31%	9.48%	55.55%	44.45%

=== South Australia ===
Date	Firm	Sample size	Primary vote					2PP vote	
Date	Firm	Sample size	LNP	ALP	GRN	ONP	OTH	ALP	L/NP
17 May 2022	Roy Morgan	—N/a	—N/a	—N/a	—N/a	—N/a	—N/a	49%	51%
10 May 2022	Roy Morgan	—N/a	—N/a	—N/a	—N/a	—N/a	—N/a	62.5%	37.5%
3 May 2022	Roy Morgan	—N/a	—N/a	—N/a	—N/a	—N/a	—N/a	62.5%	37.5%
27 Apr 2022	Roy Morgan	—N/a	—N/a	—N/a	—N/a	—N/a	—N/a	61.5%	38.5%
20 Apr 2022	Roy Morgan	—N/a	—N/a	—N/a	—N/a	—N/a	—N/a	58%	42%
11 Apr 2022	Roy Morgan	—N/a	—N/a	—N/a	—N/a	—N/a	—N/a	53%	47%
4 Apr 2022	Roy Morgan	—N/a	—N/a	—N/a	—N/a	—N/a	—N/a	56%	44%
29 Mar 2022	Roy Morgan	—N/a	—N/a	—N/a	—N/a	—N/a	—N/a	63.5%	36.5%
14-20 Mar 2022	Roy Morgan	—N/a	—N/a	—N/a	—N/a	—N/a	—N/a	60.5%	39.5%
Peter Malinauskas wins the 2022 South Australia State Election
14-23 Feb 2022	Roy Morgan	—N/a	—N/a	—N/a	—N/a	—N/a	—N/a	59.5%	41.5%
18 Feb 2022	Roy Morgan	—N/a	—N/a	—N/a	—N/a	—N/a	—N/a	59.5%	40.5%
4–16 Jan 2022	Roy Morgan	—N/a	—N/a	—N/a	—N/a	—N/a	—N/a	60.5%	39.5%
27–28 Nov, 4–5 Dec 2021	Roy Morgan	—N/a	—N/a	—N/a	—N/a	—N/a	—N/a	64.5%	35.5%
13–14, 20–21 Nov 2021	Roy Morgan	—N/a	—N/a	—N/a	—N/a	—N/a	—N/a	55.5%	44.5%
30–31 Oct, 6–7 Nov 2021	Roy Morgan	—N/a	—N/a	—N/a	—N/a	—N/a	—N/a	57.5%	42.5%
18–19, 25–26 Sep 2021	Roy Morgan	—N/a	—N/a	—N/a	—N/a	—N/a	—N/a	58.5%	41.5%
14 Jul – 18 Sep 2021	Newspoll	472	40%	38%	11%	1%	10%	53%	47%
4–5, 11–12 Sep 2021	Roy Morgan	—N/a	—N/a	—N/a	—N/a	—N/a	—N/a	51.5%	48.5%
21–22, 28–29 Aug 2021	Roy Morgan	—N/a	—N/a	—N/a	—N/a	—N/a	—N/a	57.5%	42.5%
7–8, 14–15 Aug 2021	Roy Morgan	—N/a	—N/a	—N/a	—N/a	—N/a	—N/a	54.5%	45.5%
24–25, 31 Jul – 1 Aug 2021	Roy Morgan	—N/a	—N/a	—N/a	—N/a	—N/a	—N/a	55.5%	44.5%
10–11, 17–18 Jun 2021	Roy Morgan	—N/a	—N/a	—N/a	—N/a	—N/a	—N/a	51%	49%
29–30 May, 5–6 Jun 2021	Roy Morgan	—N/a	—N/a	—N/a	—N/a	—N/a	—N/a	49.5%	50.5%
21 Apr – 26 Jun 2021	Newspoll	473	37%	39%	10%	2%	12%	54%	46%
27 Jan – 27 Mar 2021	Newspoll	517	38%	41%	10%	0%	11%	55%	45%
6–7, 13–14 Feb 2021	Roy Morgan	2786	—N/a	—N/a	—N/a	—N/a	—N/a	49.5%	50.5%
26 Aug – 28 Nov 2020	Newspoll	600	44%	36%	10%	1%	9%	49%	51%
14–15, 21–22 Nov 2020	Roy Morgan	2824	—N/a	—N/a	—N/a	—N/a	—N/a	52%	48%
8–9, 15–16 Aug 2020	Roy Morgan	2841	—N/a	—N/a	—N/a	—N/a	—N/a	42.5%	57.5%
3 Jun – 8 Aug 2020	Newspoll	457–2034	43%	36%	10%	0%	11%	50%	50%
11–12, 8–19 Jul 2020	Roy Morgan	2589	—N/a	—N/a	—N/a	—N/a	—N/a	47%	53%
11 Mar – 16 May 2020	Newspoll	472–1905	40%	37%	12%	0%	11%	53%	47%
Election: 18 May 2019			40.57%	35.38%	9.61%	0.84%	13.60%	50.71%	49.29%

=== Tasmania ===
Date	Firm	Sample size	Primary vote					2PP vote	
Date	Firm	Sample size	LNP	ALP	GRN	ONP	OTH	ALP	L/NP
17 May 2022	Roy Morgan	—N/a	—N/a	—N/a	—N/a	—N/a	—N/a	58%	42%
10 May 2022	Roy Morgan	—N/a	—N/a	—N/a	—N/a	—N/a	—N/a	40%	60%
3 May 2022	Roy Morgan	—N/a	—N/a	—N/a	—N/a	—N/a	—N/a	57.5%	42.5%
27 Apr 2022	Roy Morgan	—N/a	—N/a	—N/a	—N/a	—N/a	—N/a	64.5%	35.5%
20 Apr 2022	Roy Morgan	—N/a	—N/a	—N/a	—N/a	—N/a	—N/a	61%	39%
11 Apr 2022	Roy Morgan	—N/a	—N/a	—N/a	—N/a	—N/a	—N/a	69%	31%
4 Apr 2022	Roy Morgan	—N/a	—N/a	—N/a	—N/a	—N/a	—N/a	74%	26%
29 Mar 2022	Roy Morgan	—N/a	—N/a	—N/a	—N/a	—N/a	—N/a	53%	47%
14-20 Mar 2022	Roy Morgan	—N/a	—N/a	—N/a	—N/a	—N/a	—N/a	60%	40%
14-23 Feb 2022	Roy Morgan	—N/a	—N/a	—N/a	—N/a	—N/a	—N/a	75%	25%
18 Feb 2022	Roy Morgan	—N/a	—N/a	—N/a	—N/a	—N/a	—N/a	65%	35%
4–16 Jan 2022	Roy Morgan	—N/a	—N/a	—N/a	—N/a	—N/a	—N/a	60.5%	39.5%
27–28 Dec, 4–5 Dec 2021	Roy Morgan	—N/a	—N/a	—N/a	—N/a	—N/a	—N/a	51.5%	48.5%
13–14, 20–21 Nov 2021	Roy Morgan	—N/a	—N/a	—N/a	—N/a	—N/a	—N/a	53%	47%
30–31 Oct, 6–7 Nov 2021	Roy Morgan	—N/a	—N/a	—N/a	—N/a	—N/a	—N/a	57.5%	42.5%
18–19, 25–26 Sep 2021	Roy Morgan	—N/a	—N/a	—N/a	—N/a	—N/a	—N/a	52%	48%
4–5, 11–12 Sep 2021	Roy Morgan	—N/a	—N/a	—N/a	—N/a	—N/a	—N/a	55.5%	44.5%
21–22, 28–29 Aug 2021	Roy Morgan	—N/a	—N/a	—N/a	—N/a	—N/a	—N/a	63.5%	36.5%
7–8, 14–15 Aug 2021	Roy Morgan	—N/a	—N/a	—N/a	—N/a	—N/a	—N/a	57%	43%
24–25, 31 July − 1 Aug 2021	Roy Morgan	—N/a	—N/a	—N/a	—N/a	—N/a	—N/a	54%	46%
10–11, 17–18 Jun 2021	Roy Morgan	—N/a	—N/a	—N/a	—N/a	—N/a	—N/a	58%	42%
14–15, 21–22 Nov 2020		2824	—N/a	—N/a	—N/a	—N/a	—N/a	48%	52%
11–12, 18–19 Jul 2020	Roy Morgan	2589	—N/a	—N/a	—N/a	—N/a	—N/a	58%	42%
Election: 18 May 2019			34.60%	33.61%	10.12%	2.79%	18.88%	55.96%	44.04%

== Government approval rating ==
=== Individual polls ===
Date	Firm	Right direction	Wrong direction	Can't say	GCR	Lead
14-20 Mar 2022	Roy Morgan	33.5%	50.5%	16%	83	-17%
14-23 Feb 2022	Roy Morgan	35%	47%	18%	88	-12%
18 Feb 2022	Roy Morgan	35%	48.5%	16.5%	86.5	-13.5%
4–16 Jan 2022	Roy Morgan	34%	51%	15%	83	-17%
27–28 Nov, 4–5 Dec 2021	Roy Morgan	38%	46.5%	15.5%	91.5	-8.5%
13–14, 20–21 Nov 2021	Roy Morgan	39.5%	46%	14.5%	93.5	-6.5%
2–3, 9–10 Oct 2021	Roy Morgan	40%	45%	15%	95	-5%
18–19, 25–26 Sep 2021	Roy Morgan	40%	44%	16%	96	-4%
4–5, 11–12 Sep 2021	Roy Morgan	40%	45.5%	14.5%	94.5	-5.5%
6–7, 13–14 Feb 2021	Roy Morgan	53.5%	30%	16.5%	123.5	+23.5%
8–9, 15–16 Aug 2020	Roy Morgan	48%	34%	18%	114	+14%
11–12, 18–19 Jul 2020	Roy Morgan	49%	34.5%	16.5%	114.5	+14.5%
13–14, 23–24 Jun 2020	Roy Morgan	53.5%	29.5%	17%	124	+24%
16–17, 23–24 May 2020	Roy Morgan	54.5%	29.5%	16%	125	+25%
18–19, 25–26 Apr 2020	Roy Morgan	51.5%	27.5%	21%	124	+24%
29 Feb – 1 Mar, 7–8 Mar 2020	Roy Morgan	37%	47%	16%	90	–10%
22–23, 29–30 Jun 2019	Roy Morgan	43.5%	39%	17.5%	104.5	+4.5%

== National direction polling ==
=== Individual polls ===
Date	Firm	Right direction	Wrong direction	Can't say	Lead
07 Dec 2021	Morning Consult	53%	47%	0%	+6%
05 Nov 2021	Morning Consult	54%	46%	0%	+8%
07 Oct 2021	Morning Consult	51%	49%	0%	+2%
21 Sep 2021	Morning Consult	53%	47%	0%	+6%
01 Sep 2021	Morning Consult	49%	51%	0%	-2%
16 Aug 2021	Morning Consult	51%	49%	0%	+2%
24 Jul 2021	Morning Consult	52%	48%	0%	+4%
01 Jul 2021	Morning Consult	56%	44%	0%	+12%
18 Jun 2021	Morning Consult	60%	40%	0%	+20%
10 Mar 2021	Morning Consult	63%	37%	0%	+26%
18 Feb 2021	Morning Consult	61%	39%	0%	+22%
30 Jan 2021	Morning Consult	65%	35%	0%	+30%
07 Jan 2021	Morning Consult	61%	39%	0%	+22%
08 Dec 2020	Morning Consult	68%	32%	0%	+36%
03 Nov 2020	Morning Consult	61%	39%	0%	+22%
04 Oct 2020	Morning Consult	59%	41%	0%	+18%
05 Sep 2020	Morning Consult	53%	47%	0%	+6%
26 Aug 2020	Morning Consult	59%	41%	0%	+18%
10 Aug 2020	Morning Consult	51%	49%	0%	+2%
12 Jul 2020	Morning Consult	56%	44%	0%	+12%
13 Jun 2020	Morning Consult	60%	40%	0%	+20%
06 Jun 2020	Morning Consult	57%	42%	1%	+15%
31 May 2020	Morning Consult	63%	37%	0%	+26%
21 May 2020	Morning Consult	62%	38%	0%	+24%
14 May 2020	Morning Consult	60%	40%	0%	+20%
5 May 2020	Morning Consult	62%	38%	0%	+24%
25 Apr 2020	Morning Consult	57%	42%	1%	+15%
18 Apr 2020	Morning Consult	56%	43%	1%	+13%
09 Apr 2020	Morning Consult	51%	49%	0%	+2%
02 Apr 2020	Morning Consult	46%	54%	0%	-8%
27 Mar 2020	Morning Consult	42%	57%	1%	-15%
20 Mar 2020	Morning Consult	39%	61%	0%	-22%
14 Mar 2020	Morning Consult	38%	62%	0%	-24%
07 Mar 2020	Morning Consult	39%	61%	0%	-22%
01 Mar 2020	Morning Consult	41%	59%	0%	-18%
20 Feb 2020	Morning Consult	39%	61%	0%	-22%
13 Feb 2020	Morning Consult	40%	60%	0%	-20%
07 Feb 2020	Morning Consult	38%	62%	0%	-24%
31 Jan 2020	Morning Consult	40%	60%	0%	-20%
22 Jan 2020	Morning Consult	39%	61%	0%	-22%
15 Jan 2020	Morning Consult	37%	63%	0%	-26%
06 Jan 2020	Morning Consult	37%	63%	0%	-26%

== See also ==
- Opinion polling for the 2019 Australian federal election
