= Opinion polling for the 2025 Australian federal election =

In the lead-up to the 2025 Australian federal election, a number of polling companies conducted opinion polls for various news organisations. These polls collected data on parties' primary vote, leaders’ favourability, and contained an estimation of the two-party-preferred lead.

== Voting intention ==
=== 2025 ===
Date	Brand	Interview mode	Sample size	Primary vote							2pp vote (Note: Resolve Strategic Poll 2PP calculated based on preference flows at the 2022 Australian federal election by the Poll Bludger, Kevin Bonham and the Federal 2PP estimator made by Armarium Interreta.)	
Date	Brand	Interview mode	Sample size	L/NP	ALP	GRN	ONP	TOP (Note: In February 2025, the High Court ruled that the United Australia Party (UAP) could not be re-registered for the 2025 federal election. UAP founder Clive Palmer subsequently joined another political party, Trumpet of Patriots (TOP). The final poll to feature the UAP was from Roy Morgan and released on 17 February 2025, with the first poll to feature TOP from YouGov on 28 February 2025.)	OTH	UND	ALP	L/NP
3 May 2025	Election			31.8%	34.6%	12.2%	6.4%	1.9%	13.1%	—	55.2%	44.8%
28 Apr – 2 May 2025	Roy Morgan	Online	1,368	34.5%	33%	13.5%	6.5%	2%	10.5%	—N/a	53%	47%
28 Apr - 1 May 2025	Ipsos	Online	2,574	33%	28%	12%	8%	2%	12%	5%	51%	49%
29 Apr – 1 May 2025	Freshwater Strategy	Online	2,055	37%	33%	12%	8%	—N/a	10%	—N/a	51.5%	48.5%
28 Apr – 1 May 2025	Newspoll	Online	1,270	34%	33%	13%	8%	—N/a	12%	—N/a	52.5%	47.5%
24 Apr – 1 May 2025	YouGov	Online	3,003	31.4%	31.1%	14.6%	8.5%	2.5%	11.9%	—N/a	52.2%	47.8%
27–30 Apr 2025	DemosAU	Online	4,100	33%	31%	12%	9%	—N/a	15%	—N/a	52%	48%
27–29 Apr 2025	DemosAU	Online	1,974	32%	29%	12%	9%	—N/a	18%	—N/a	51%	49%
24–29 Apr 2025	Redbridge/Accent	Online	1,011	34%	34%	12%	8%	—N/a	12%	—N/a	53%	47%
24–28 Apr 2025	Spectre Strategy (Note: Sum corrected to round to 100)	Online	2,000	34%	31%	14.5%	9.5%	—N/a	11%	—N/a	53%	47%
23–28 Apr 2025	Resolve Strategic	Telephone /Online	2,010	35%	31%	14%	7%	—N/a	13%	—N/a	53%	47%
24–27 Apr 2025	Essential	Online	2,163	34%	32%	13%	10%	2%	9%	—N/a	52.1%	47.9%
21–27 Apr 2025	Roy Morgan	Online	1,524	34.5%	34%	13%	7.5%	1.5%	9.5%	—N/a	53%	47%
27 Apr 2025	The fourth leaders' debate takes place											
21–25 Apr 2025	Newspoll	Online	1,254	35%	34%	11%	8%	—N/a	12%	—N/a	52%	48%
1–25 Apr 2025	YouGov MRP	Online	10,822	31.1%	31.4%	12.6%	9.1%	—N/a	15.7%	—N/a	52.9%	47.1%
22–23 Apr 2025	DemosAU	Online	1,073	31%	29%	14%	9%	3%	14% (Note: Including 7% for independents, 2% for Family First, 1% for Legalise Cannabis, 1% for the Libertarian Party, and 3% for all others.)	—N/a	52%	48%
17–22 Apr 2025	YouGov	Online	1,500	31%	33.5%	14%	10.5%	2%	9%	—N/a	53.5%	46.5%
22 Apr 2025	The third leaders' debate takes place and early voting begins											
14–20 Apr 2025	Roy Morgan	Online	1,605	34%	34.5%	14.5%	6%	0.5%	11%	—N/a	55.5%	44.5%
14–17 Apr 2025	Newspoll	Online	1,263	35%	34%	12%	7%	—N/a	12%	—N/a	52%	48%
14–16 Apr 2025	Freshwater Strategy	Online	1,062	39%	32%	12%	—N/a	—N/a	17%	—N/a	50%	50%
16 Apr 2025	The second leaders' debate takes place											
11–15 Apr 2025	YouGov	Online	1,506	33%	33%	13%	7%	2%	12%	—N/a	53%	47%
9–14 Apr 2025	Essential	Online	2,142	32%	31%	13%	9%	2%	9%	4%	50%	45%
9–13 Apr 2025	Resolve Strategic	Online	1,642	34%	31%	13%	6%	—N/a	17%	—N/a	53.5%	46.5%
7–13 Apr 2025	Roy Morgan	Online	1,708	33.5%	32%	14.5%	6%	1%	13%	—N/a	54.5%	45.5%
7–10 Apr 2025	Newspoll	Online	1,271	35%	33%	12%	8%	—N/a	12%	—N/a	52%	48%
4–10 Apr 2025	YouGov	Online	1,505	33.5%	32.0%	13.0%	8.5%	1.0%	12.0%	—N/a	52.5%	47.5%
8 Apr 2025	The first leaders' debate takes place											
31 Mar – 4 Apr 2025	Newspoll	Online	1,250	36%	33%	12%	7%	—N/a	12%	—N/a	52%	48%
31 Mar – 4 Apr 2025	Roy Morgan	Online	1,481	33%	32.5%	13.5%	6%	1.5%	13.5%	—N/a	53.5%	46.5%
28 Mar – 3 Apr 2025	YouGov	Online	1,622	35%	30%	13%	7%	2%	13%	—N/a	51%	49%
28 Mar – 1 Apr 2025	Redbridge/Accent	Online	1,006	36%	33%	12%	—N/a	—N/a	19%	—N/a	52%	48%
28–30 Mar 2025	Freshwater Strategy	Online	1,059	39%	32%	12%	—N/a	—N/a	17%	—N/a	49%	51%
26–30 Mar 2025	Resolve Strategic	Online	3,237	37%	29%	13%	7%	—N/a	14%	—N/a	50%	50%
26–30 Mar 2025	Essential	Online	1,100	34%	30%	12%	9%	2%	8%	5%	48%	47%
24–30 Mar 2025	Roy Morgan	Online	1,377	35%	32%	13%	5.5%	—N/a	14.5%	—N/a	53%	47%
27–29 Mar 2025	Newspoll	Online	1,249	37%	33%	12%	6%	—N/a	12%	—N/a	51%	49%
28 Mar 2025	The 2025 Australian federal election is called for 3 May											
27 Feb – 26 Mar 2025	YouGov MRP	Online	10,217	35.5%	29.8%	13.2%	9.3%	—N/a	12.2% (Note: Including projected vote patterns from independent voters and voters for other parties. Independents under this projection would receive 8.3% of the first-preference vote while other parties would receive 3.9% of the first-preference vote.)	—N/a	50.2%	49.8%
13–24 Mar 2025	Redbridge/Accent	Online	2,039	38%	34%	11%	—N/a	—N/a	17%	—N/a	51%	49%
17–23 Mar 2025	Roy Morgan	Online	1,683	35.5%	33.5%	12.5%	4%	—N/a	14.5%	—N/a	53%	47%
14–19 Mar 2025	YouGov	Online	1,500	37%	31%	13%	7%	1%	11%	—N/a	50%	50%
12–16 Mar 2025	Essential	Online	2,256	35%	29%	12%	8%	1% (Note: Poll shows the United Australia Party (UAP) prior to Clive Palmer joining Trumpet of Patriots (TOP).)	9%	6%	47%	47%
10–16 Mar 2025	Roy Morgan	Online	2,097	34%	32.5%	13.5%	5%	—N/a	15%	—N/a	54.5%	45.5%
13–15 Mar 2025	Freshwater Strategy	Online	1,051	39%	31%	14%	—N/a	—N/a	16%	—N/a	49%	51%
7–13 Mar 2025	YouGov	Online	1,526	36%	31%	13.5%	7.5%	1%	11%	—N/a	51%	49%
3–11 Mar 2025	Redbridge/Accent	Online	2,007	37%	32%	12%	—N/a	—N/a	19%	—N/a	51%	49%
3–9 Mar 2025	Roy Morgan	Online	1,719	37%	30%	13.5%	5%	—N/a	14.5%	—N/a	51.5%	48.5%
3–7 Mar 2025	Newspoll	Online	1,255	39%	32%	12%	7%	—N/a	10%	—N/a	49%	51%
28 Feb – 6 Mar 2025	YouGov	Online	1,504	36%	31%	13%	7%	1%	12%	—N/a	51%	49%
26 Feb – 2 Mar 2025	Essential	Online	1,150	35%	29%	13%	8%	1%	10%	5%	47%	48%
24 Feb – 2 Mar 2025	Roy Morgan	Online	1,673	40%	28.5%	13.5%	4%	—N/a	14%	—N/a	49.5%	50.5%
21–27 Feb 2025	YouGov	Online	1,501	37%	28%	14%	8%	1%	12%	—N/a	49%	51%
20–25 Feb 2025	RedBridge/Accent (Note: Polling of 20 marginal seats)	Online	1,002	41%	34%	12%	—N/a	—N/a	13%	—N/a	49.5%	50.5%
21–23 Feb 2025	Freshwater Strategy	Online	1,038	41%	31%	13%	—N/a	—N/a	15%	—N/a	48%	52%
18–23 Feb 2025	Resolve Strategic	Online	1,506	39%	25%	13%	9%	—N/a	13%	—N/a	45%	55%
17–23 Feb 2025	Roy Morgan	Online	1,666	36.5%	31.5%	13.5%	5%	—N/a	13.5%	—N/a	51%	49%
12–16 Feb 2025	Essential	Online	1,146	35%	30%	12%	9%	1%	9%	4%	48%	48%
10–16 Feb 2025	Roy Morgan	Online	1,666	39.5%	28%	12.5%	5.5%	—N/a	14.5%	—N/a	48.5%	51.5%
10–14 Feb 2025	Newspoll	Online	1,244	38%	31%	12%	7%	—N/a	12%	—N/a	49%	51%
22 Jan – 12 Feb 2025	YouGov MRP	Online	8,732	37.4%	29.1%	12.7%	9.1%	—N/a	11.7% (Note: Including projected vote patterns from independent voters and voters for other parties. Independents under this projection would receive 8.9% of the first-preference vote while other parties would receive 2.8% of the first-preference vote.)	—N/a	48.9%	51.1%
4–11 Feb 2025	RedBridge/Accent (Note: Polling of 20 marginal seats)	Online	1,002	43%	33%	12%	—N/a	—N/a	12%	—N/a	48%	52%
3–9 Feb 2025	Roy Morgan	Online	1,688	40.5%	29%	11%	4%	—N/a	15.5%	—N/a	48.5%	51.5%
3–7 Feb 2025	RedBridge Group	Online	1,013	40%	31%	11%	—N/a	—N/a	18%	—N/a	48.5%	51.5%
29 Jan – 3 Feb 2025	Essential	Online	1,150	36%	30%	12%	8%	1%	9%	4%	47%	49%
27 Jan – 2 Feb 2025	Roy Morgan	Online	1,694	38.5%	30%	11.5%	5.5%	—N/a	14.5%	—N/a	50%	50%
28 Jan – 1 Feb 2025	DemosAU	Online	1,238	38%	33%	12%	7%	—N/a	10%	5%	50%	50%
20–26 Jan 2025	Roy Morgan	Online	1,567	40.5%	29.5%	11.5%	6%	—N/a	12.5%	—N/a	48%	52%
20–24 Jan 2025	Newspoll	Online	1,259	39%	31%	12%	7%	—N/a	11%	—N/a	49%	51%
15–21 Jan 2025	Resolve Strategic	Online	1,616	38%	27%	13%	7%	—N/a	16%	—N/a	48%	52%
17–19 Jan 2025	Freshwater Strategy	Online	1,063	40%	32%	13%	—N/a	—N/a	15%	—N/a	49%	51%
15–19 Jan 2025	Essential	Online	1,132	37%	30%	12%	7%	2%	7%	5%	47%	48%
13–19 Jan 2025	Roy Morgan	Online	1,564	42%	28.5%	13%	4%	—N/a	12.5%	—N/a	48%	52%
9–15 Jan 2025	YouGov	Online	1,504	39%	32%	12%	7%	—N/a	10%	—N/a	49%	51%
6–12 Jan 2025	Roy Morgan	Online	1,721	40.5%	30%	12.5%	4.5%	—N/a	12.5%	—N/a	48.5%	51.5%
30 Dec – 5 Jan 2025	Roy Morgan	Online	1,446	40.5%	31%	12%	3.5%	—N/a	13%	—N/a	47%	53%

=== 2024 ===
Date	Brand	Interview mode	Sample size	Primary vote							2pp vote	
Date	Brand	Interview mode	Sample size	L/NP	ALP	GRN	ONP	UAP	OTH	UND	ALP	L/NP
13–15 Dec 2024	Freshwater Strategy	Online	1,051	40%	30%	14%	—N/a	—N/a	16%	—N/a	49%	51%
12–15 Dec 2024	Essential	Online	1,151	35%	30%	13%	6%	1%	11%	5%	47%	48%
9–15 Dec 2024	Roy Morgan	Online	1,672	41%	27.5%	12.5%	5%	—N/a	14%	—N/a	48%	52%
4–8 Dec 2024	Resolve Strategic	Online	1,604	38%	27%	12%	7%	—N/a	16%	—N/a	49%	51%
2–8 Dec 2024	Roy Morgan	Online	1,653	38%	28%	13%	6.5%	—N/a	14.5%	—N/a	48%	52%
2–6 Dec 2024	Newspoll	Online	1,258	39%	33%	11%	7%	—N/a	10%	—N/a	50%	50%
27 Nov – 1 Dec 2024	Essential	Online	1,123	35%	32%	11%	8%	1%	9%	5%	47%	48%
25 Nov – 1 Dec 2024	Roy Morgan	Online	1,666	38.5%	30%	12.5%	6.5%	—N/a	12.5%	—N/a	49%	51%
18–24 Nov 2024	Roy Morgan	Online	1,663	37%	31.5%	12.5%	6.5%	—N/a	12.5%	—N/a	51%	49%
19–21 Nov 2024	DemosAU	Online	1,038	38%	32%	12%	7%	—N/a	11%	—N/a	50%	50%
15–21 Nov 2024	YouGov	Online	1,515	38%	30%	13%	9%	—N/a	10%	—N/a	50%	50%
29 Oct – 20 Nov 2024	RedBridge Group	Online	4,909	39%	31%	11%	—N/a	—N/a	19%	—N/a	49%	51%
13–18 Nov 2024	Essential	Online	1,206	35%	30%	13%	7%	2%	8%	5%	48%	47%
15–17 Nov 2024	Freshwater Strategy	Online	1,046	40%	30%	14%	—N/a	—N/a	16%	—N/a	49%	51%
11–17 Nov 2024	Roy Morgan	Online	1,675	39%	29%	13.5%	6.5%	—N/a	12%	—N/a	49%	51%
6–13 Nov 2024	RedBridge Group	Online	2,011	39%	34%	11%	—N/a	—N/a	16%	—N/a	50%	50%
5–10 Nov 2024	Resolve Strategic	Online	1,621	39%	30%	11%	5%	—N/a	15%	—N/a	49%	51%
4–10 Nov 2024	Roy Morgan	Online	1,665	37.5%	30.5%	12.5%	6.5%	—N/a	13%	—N/a	49.5%	50.5%
4–8 Nov 2024	Newspoll	Online	1,261	40%	33%	11%	5%	—N/a	11%	—N/a	49%	51%
30 Oct – 3 Nov 2024	Essential	Online	1,131	34%	31%	12%	9%	2%	8%	5%	47%	49%
28 Oct – 3 Nov 2024	Roy Morgan	Online	1,651	38%	30.5%	14%	6%	—N/a	11.5%	—N/a	49%	51%
21–27 Oct 2024	Roy Morgan	Online	1,687	37.5%	30%	14%	5.5%	—N/a	13%	—N/a	50.5%	49.5%
14–25 Oct 2024	ANU	Online	3,622	38.2%	31.8%	11.8%	—N/a	—N/a	—N/a	9.5%	50%	50%
18–20 Oct 2024	Freshwater Strategy	Online	1,034	41%	30%	13%	—N/a	—N/a	16%	—N/a	49%	51%
16–20 Oct 2024	Essential	Online	1,140	35%	28%	12%	7%	2%	9%	6%	46%	48%
14–20 Oct 2024	Roy Morgan	Online	1,687	36.5%	32%	13.5%	5.5%	—N/a	12.5%	—N/a	52%	48%
7–13 Oct 2024	Roy Morgan	Online	1,697	37.5%	30%	14%	6%	—N/a	12.5%	—N/a	50%	50%
7–11 Oct 2024	Newspoll	Online	1,258	38%	31%	12%	7%	—N/a	12%	—N/a	49%	51%
2–6 Oct 2024	Essential	Online	1,139	34%	32%	12%	8%	1%	9%	5%	49%	47%
30 Sep – 6 Oct 2024	Roy Morgan	Online	1,697	37.5%	31.5%	12.5%	5.5%	—N/a	13%	—N/a	50%	50%
1–5 Oct 2024	Resolve Strategic	Online	1,606	38%	30%	12%	5%	—N/a	15%	—N/a	50%	50%
23–29 Sep 2024	Roy Morgan	Online	1,668	38%	30%	13.5%	4.5%	—N/a	14%	—N/a	49%	51%
18–22 Sep 2024	Essential	Online	1,117	35%	29%	12%	8%	2%	9%	5%	47%	48%
16–22 Sep 2024	Roy Morgan	Online	1,662	37.5%	32%	12.5%	5%	—N/a	13%	—N/a	50.5%	49.5%
16–20 Sep 2024	Newspoll	Online	1,249	38%	31%	13%	6%	—N/a	12%	—N/a	50%	50%
13–19 Sep 2024	YouGov	Online	1,619	39%	30%	14%	7%	—N/a	10%	—N/a	50%	50%
13–15 Sep 2024	Freshwater Strategy	Online	1,057	42%	30%	13%	—N/a	—N/a	15%	—N/a	48%	52%
9–15 Sep 2024	Roy Morgan	Online	1,634	37.5%	30.5%	12.5%	5.5%	—N/a	14%	—N/a	50.5%	49.5%
2–8 Sep 2024	Roy Morgan	Online	1,703	36.5%	30%	14.5%	6%	—N/a	13%	—N/a	51%	49%
3–7 Sep 2024	Essential	Online	1,132	35%	30%	13%	8%	1%	8%	5%	48%	48%
3–7 Sep 2024	Resolve Strategic	Online	1,614	37%	28%	13%	6%	1%	15%	—N/a	50%	50%
26 Aug – 1 Sep 2024	Roy Morgan	Online	1,697	36%	30.5%	13%	6%	—N/a	14.5%	—N/a	50.5%	49.5%
26–30 Aug 2024	Newspoll	Online	1,263	38%	32%	12%	7%	—N/a	11%	—N/a	50%	50%
6–29 Aug 2024	Wolf & Smith	Online	10,239	36%	29%	13%	6%	—N/a	15%	—N/a	51%	49%
23–28 Aug 2024	YouGov	Online	1,543	37%	32%	13%	8%	—N/a	10%	—N/a	50%	50%
20–27 Aug 2024	RedBridge Group	Online	2,017	38%	33%	12%	—N/a	—N/a	17%	—N/a	50.5%	49.5%
10 Jul – 27 Aug 2024	RedBridge Group	Online	5,976	38%	32%	12%	—N/a	—N/a	18%	—N/a	50%	50%
19–25 Aug 2024	Roy Morgan	Online	1,701	39.5%	29.5%	13%	4%	—N/a	14%	—N/a	49.5%	50.5%
20–24 Aug 2024	Essential	Online	1,129	33%	29%	13%	7%	1%	11%	6%	48%	46%
16–18 Aug 2024	Freshwater Strategy	Online	1,061	41%	32%	12%	—N/a	—N/a	15%	—N/a	49%	51%
12–18 Aug 2024	Roy Morgan	Online	1,698	38.5%	30.5%	13.5%	4%	—N/a	13.5%	—N/a	50.5%	49.5%
8–11 Aug 2024	Essential	Online	1,132	34%	28%	14%	7%	1%	9%	6%	47%	47%
7–11 Aug 2024	Resolve Strategic	Online	1,607	37%	29%	13%	6%	2%	13%	—N/a	50%	50%
5–11 Aug 2024	Roy Morgan	Online	1,671	38%	29.5%	14%	5%	—N/a	13.5%	—N/a	50%	50%
5–9 Aug 2024	Newspoll	Online	1,266	39%	32%	12%	6%	—N/a	11%	—N/a	50%	50%
29 Jul – 4 Aug 2024	Roy Morgan	Online	1,655	37%	30.5%	12%	5.5%	—N/a	15%	—N/a	51.5%	48.5%
24–28 Jul 2024	Essential	Online	1,137	34%	32%	11%	7%	2%	9%	6%	47%	46%
22–28 Jul 2024	Roy Morgan	Online	1,652	37.5%	30.5%	13%	6.5%	—N/a	12.5%	—N/a	50.5%	49.5%
19–21 Jul 2024	Freshwater Strategy	Online	1,060	40%	31%	13%	—N/a	—N/a	16%	—N/a	49%	51%
15–21 Jul 2024	Roy Morgan	Online	1,752	39.5%	31.5%	13%	5%	—N/a	11%	—N/a	49%	51%
15–19 Jul 2024	Newspoll	Online	1,258	38%	33%	13%	6%	—N/a	10%	—N/a	51%	49%
10–19 Jul 2024	RedBridge Group	Online	1,505	41%	32%	11%	—N/a	—N/a	16%	—N/a	48.5%	51.5%
12–17 Jul 2024	YouGov	Online	1,528	38%	31%	13%	7%	—N/a	11%	—N/a	51%	49%
10–14 Jul 2024	Essential	Online	1,122	33%	29%	13%	8%	3%	9%	6%	46%	48%
8–14 Jul 2024	Roy Morgan	Online	1,758	37.5%	31%	12.5%	5%	—N/a	14%	—N/a	49.5%	50.5%
10–13 Jul 2024	Resolve Strategic	Online	1,603	38%	28%	13%	6%	1%	13%	—N/a	50%	50%
1–7 Jul 2024	Roy Morgan	Online	1,723	39.5%	28.5%	13.5%	5%	—N/a	13.5%	—N/a	48%	52%
26–30 Jun 2024	Essential	Online	1,141	33%	30%	12%	7%	1%	10%	7%	46%	47%
24–30 Jun 2024	Roy Morgan	Online	1,708	36.5%	31.5%	13%	4.5%	—N/a	14.5%	—N/a	51%	49%
24–28 Jun 2024	Newspoll	Online	1,260	36%	32%	13%	7%	—N/a	12%	—N/a	51%	49%
17–23 Jun 2024	Roy Morgan	Online	1,696	37%	31.5%	13%	6%	—N/a	12.5%	—N/a	51%	49%
14–16 Jun 2024	Freshwater Strategy	Online	1,060	40%	32%	13%	—N/a	—N/a	15%	—N/a	50%	50%
12–16 Jun 2024	Essential	Online	1,181	32%	31%	13%	8%	1%	9%	6%	48%	46%
10–16 Jun 2024	Roy Morgan	Online	1,724	38%	29.5%	13.5%	5%	—N/a	14%	—N/a	50%	50%
11–15 Jun 2024	Resolve Strategic	Online	1,607	36%	28%	14%	6%	1%	15%	—N/a	51%	49%
3–9 Jun 2024	Roy Morgan	Online	1,687	35%	30.5%	15.5%	5.5%	—N/a	13.5%	—N/a	53.5%	46.5%
3–7 Jun 2024	Newspoll	Online	1,232	39%	33%	11%	7%	—N/a	10%	—N/a	50%	50%
31 May – 4 Jun 2024	YouGov	Online	1,500	38%	30%	14%	8%	—N/a	10%	—N/a	50%	50%
29 May – 2 Jun 2024	Essential	Online	1,160	36%	32%	13%	5%	3%	8%	4%	48%	48%
27 May – 2 Jun 2024	Roy Morgan	Online	1,579	36%	31%	14%	4.5%	—N/a	14.5%	—N/a	52%	48%
20–26 May 2024	Roy Morgan	Online	1,488	37%	28.5%	15%	6%	—N/a	13.5%	—N/a	48.5%	51.5%
17–19 May 2024	Freshwater Strategy	Online	1,056	40%	32%	14%	—N/a	—N/a	14%	—N/a	50%	50%
16–19 May 2024	Essential	Online	1,149	34%	31%	10%	8%	1%	8%	6%	46%	47%
15–19 May 2024	Resolve Strategic	Online	1,602	36%	29%	12%	7%	2%	14%	—N/a	50%	50%
13–19 May 2024	Roy Morgan	Online	1,674	37%	30.5%	14.5%	5.5%	—N/a	12.5%	—N/a	50.5%	49.5%
16–18 May 2024	Newspoll	Online	1,280	37%	34%	13%	7%	—N/a	9%	—N/a	52%	48%
10–14 May 2024	YouGov	Online	1,506	38%	30%	13%	8%	—N/a	11%	—N/a	50%	50%
6–12 May 2024	Roy Morgan	Online	1,654	37%	32%	13.5%	5.5%	—N/a	12%	—N/a	52%	48%
1–5 May 2024	Essential	Online	1,150	34%	31%	13%	7%	1%	7%	7%	46%	47%
29 Apr – 5 May 2024	Roy Morgan	Online	1,666	37%	30%	13%	6%	—N/a	14%	—N/a	52%	48%
22–28 Apr 2024	Roy Morgan	Online	1,719	36.5%	31.5%	14%	5.5%	—N/a	12.5%	—N/a	52%	48%
19–23 Apr 2024	YouGov	Online	1,514	36%	33%	13%	8%	—N/a	10%	—N/a	52%	48%
17–21 Apr 2024	Essential	Online	1,145	35%	31%	11%	9%	1%	9%	4%	47%	49%
17–21 Apr 2024	Resolve Strategic	Online	1,610	36%	30%	13%	5%	2%	14%	—N/a	50%	50%
15–21 Apr 2024	Roy Morgan	Online	1,617	35.5%	30.5%	16%	5.5%	—N/a	12.5%	—N/a	52%	48%
12–21 Apr 2024	RedBridge Group	Online	1,529	37%	33%	12%	7%	—N/a	11%	—N/a	52%	48%
15–18 Apr 2024	Newspoll	Online	1,236	38%	33%	12%	7%	—N/a	10%	—N/a	51%	49%
12–14 Apr 2024	Freshwater Strategy	Online	1,055	40%	31%	13%	—N/a	—N/a	16%	—N/a	50%	50%
8–14 Apr 2024	Roy Morgan	Online	1,706	38.5%	30%	13.5%	5.5%	—N/a	12.5%	—N/a	49%	51%
13 Apr 2024	The Liberals are re-elected in the 2024 Cook by-election											
3–7 Apr 2024	Essential	Online	1,165	34%	29%	14%	6%	2%	8%	6%	48%	46%
1–7 Apr 2024	Roy Morgan	Online	1,731	38%	29.5%	13.5%	6%	—N/a	13%	—N/a	49.5%	50.5%
25–31 Mar 2024	Roy Morgan	Online	1,677	37.5%	30%	15.5%	3.5%	—N/a	13.5%	—N/a	51%	49%
22–27 Mar 2024	YouGov	Online	1,513	38%	32%	13%	7%	—N/a	10%	—N/a	51%	49%
21–24 Mar 2024	Resolve Strategic	Online	1,610	35%	32%	13%	5%	2%	13%	—N/a	53%	47%
20–24 Mar 2024	Essential	Online	1,150	36%	29%	11%	7%	3%	7%	6%	44%	50%
18–24 Mar 2024	Roy Morgan	Online	1,633	38%	31.5%	14%	4.5%	—N/a	12%	—N/a	50%	50%
18–22 Mar 2024	Newspoll	Online	1,223	37%	32%	13%	7%	—N/a	11%	—N/a	51%	49%
11–17 Mar 2024	Roy Morgan	Online	1,710	37%	31.5%	12.5%	5.5%	—N/a	13.5%	—N/a	51.5%	48.5%
8–10 Mar 2024	Freshwater Strategy	Online	1,051	39%	31%	14%	—N/a	—N/a	16%	—N/a	51%	49%
4–10 Mar 2024	Roy Morgan	Online	1,714	38%	32%	13%	4%	—N/a	13%	—N/a	51.5%	48.5%
5–9 Mar 2024	Essential	Online	1,126	35%	32%	11%	8%	2%	8%	5%	48%	47%
24 Feb – 5 Mar 2024	YouGov	Online	1,539	37%	32%	15%	6%	—N/a	10%	—N/a	52%	48%
26 Feb – 3 Mar 2024	Roy Morgan	Online	1,679	36.5%	34%	13.5%	3.5%	—N/a	12.5%	—N/a	53.5%	46.5%
2 Mar 2024	Labor is re-elected in the 2024 Dunkley by-election											
21–25 Feb 2024	Essential	Online	1,145	35%	30%	13%	7%	2%	8%	4%	47%	48%
19–25 Feb 2024	Roy Morgan	Online	1,682	38%	31.5%	12%	5%	—N/a	13.5%	—N/a	50%	50%
21–24 Feb 2024	Resolve Strategic	Online	1,603	37%	34%	11%	6%	1%	13%	—N/a	52%	48%
19–23 Feb 2024	Newspoll	Online	1,245	36%	33%	12%	6%	—N/a	13%	—N/a	52%	48%
16–18 Feb 2024	Freshwater Strategy	Online	1,049	38%	31%	14%	—N/a	—N/a	17%	—N/a	51%	49%
12–18 Feb 2024	Roy Morgan	Online	1,706	37%	34%	13%	4%	—N/a	12%	—N/a	52.5%	47.5%
7–11 Feb 2024	Essential	Online	1,148	34%	31%	14%	7%	1%	9%	5%	50%	46%
5–11 Feb 2024	Roy Morgan	Online	1,699	37%	34.5%	12%	4.5%	—N/a	12%	—N/a	52%	48%
2–7 Feb 2024	YouGov	Online	1,502	36%	32%	14%	8%	—N/a	10%	—N/a	52%	48%
30 Jan – 7 Feb 2024	RedBridge Group	Online	2,040	38%	33%	13%	—N/a	—N/a	16%	—N/a	51.2%	48.8%
29 Jan – 4 Feb 2024	Roy Morgan	Online	1,709	37%	33%	12%	5%	—N/a	13%	—N/a	53%	47%
31 Jan – 3 Feb 2024	Newspoll	Online	1,245	36%	34%	12%	7%	—N/a	11%	—N/a	52%	48%
24–28 Jan 2024	Essential	Online	1,201	34%	32%	13%	7%	2%	7%	5%	48%	46%
22–28 Jan 2024	Roy Morgan	Online	1,688	37.5%	31%	13%	5.5%	—N/a	13%	—N/a	50.5%	49.5%
15–21 Jan 2024	Roy Morgan	Online	1,675	36%	32.5%	12.5%	5%	—N/a	14%	—N/a	52.5%	47.5%
12–17 Jan 2024	YouGov	Online	1,532	37%	32%	13%	7%	—N/a	11%	—N/a	52%	48%
8–14 Jan 2024	Roy Morgan	Online	1,727	37%	31.5%	12%	4.5%	—N/a	15%	—N/a	51.5%	48.5%
10–11 Jan 2024	Freshwater Strategy	Online	1,007	39%	31%	13%	—N/a	—N/a	16%	—N/a	50%	50%
2–7 Jan 2024	Roy Morgan	Online	1,716	39%	29%	13%	5%	—N/a	14%	—N/a	49%	51%

=== 2023 ===
Date	Brand	Interview mode	Sample size	Primary vote							2pp vote	
Date	Brand	Interview mode	Sample size	L/NP	ALP	GRN	ONP	UAP	OTH	UND	ALP	L/NP
15–17 Dec 2023	Freshwater Strategy	Online	1,109	39%	31%	13%	—N/a	—N/a	16%	—N/a	50%	50%
11–17 Dec 2023	Roy Morgan	Online	1,109	38%	32%	11.5%	4.5%	—N/a	14%	—N/a	50%	50%
11–15 Dec 2023	Newspoll	Online	1,219	36%	33%	13%	7%	—N/a	11%	—N/a	52%	48%
6–11 Dec 2023	Essential	Online	1,102	34%	31%	13%	6%	2%	9%	5%	49%	46%
6–11 Dec 2023	RedBridge Group	Online	2,010	35%	33%	13%	—N/a	—N/a	19%	—N/a	52.8%	47.2%
1–5 Dec 2023	YouGov	Online	1,555	36%	29%	15%	7%	—N/a	13%	—N/a	51%	49%
29 Nov – 3 Dec 2023	Resolve Strategic	Online	1,605	34%	35%	12%	5%	1%	12%	—N/a	55%	45%
27 Nov – 3 Dec 2023	Roy Morgan	—N/a	1,730	37.5%	32.5%	12.5%	5%	—N/a	12.5%	—N/a	51%	49%
22–26 Nov 2023	Essential	Online	1,151	34%	31%	13%	7%	1%	8%	6%	48%	47%
20–26 Nov 2023	Roy Morgan	—N/a	1,379	35%	32%	13.5%	5%	—N/a	14.5%	—N/a	52.5%	47.5%
20–24 Nov 2023	Newspoll	Online	1,216	38%	31%	13%	6%	—N/a	12%	—N/a	50%	50%
13–19 Nov 2023	Roy Morgan	—N/a	1,401	37.5%	29.5%	13.5%	6.5%	—N/a	13%	—N/a	49.5%	50.5%
10–14 Nov 2023	YouGov	Online	1,582	36%	31%	13%	7%	—N/a	13%	—N/a	51%	49%
8–12 Nov 2023	Essential	Online	1,150	34%	32%	12%	7%	2%	8%	5%	49%	47%
6–12 Nov 2023	Roy Morgan	—N/a	1,397	36.5%	30%	13%	6%	—N/a	14.5%	—N/a	50%	50%
1–5 Nov 2023	Resolve Strategic	Online	1,602	30%	35%	13%	7%	2%	13%	—N/a	57%	43%
30 Oct – 3 Nov 2023	Newspoll	Online	1,220	37%	35%	12%	6%	—N/a	10%	—N/a	52%	48%
27 Oct – 2 Nov 2023	RedBridge Group	Online	1,205	35%	34%	14%	—N/a	—N/a	17%	—N/a	53.5%	46.5%
25–29 Oct 2023	Essential	Online	1,149	34%	32%	10%	7%	3%	9%	6%	48%	46%
23–29 Oct 2023	Roy Morgan	—N/a	1,375	35%	32.5%	15%	—N/a	—N/a	17.5%	—N/a	53%	47%
16–22 Oct 2023	Roy Morgan	—N/a	1,383	36%	32%	14%	4.5%	—N/a	13.5%	—N/a	49.5%	50.5%
14 Oct 2023	The 2023 Australian Indigenous Voice referendum is defeated											
4–12 Oct 2023	Newspoll	Online	2,638	35%	36%	12%	6%	—N/a	11%	—N/a	54%	46%
6–10 Oct 2023	YouGov	Online	1,519	36%	33%	14%	6%	—N/a	11%	—N/a	53%	47%
3–6 Oct 2023	Newspoll	Online	1,225	36%	34%	12%	5%	—N/a	13%	—N/a	53%	47%
22 Sep – 4 Oct 2023	Resolve Strategic	Online	4,728	31%	37%	12%	7%	2%	11%	—N/a	57%	43%
27 Sept – 1 Oct 2023	Essential	Online	1,125	32%	33%	14%	6%	2%	7%	5%	50%	45%
25–29 Sep 2023	YouGov	Online	1,563	35%	33%	13%	—N/a	—N/a	19%	—N/a	53%	47%
22–24 Sep 2023	Freshwater Strategy	Online	1,003	37%	33%	13%	—N/a	—N/a	17%	—N/a	51%	49%
18–22 Sep 2023	Newspoll	Online	1,239	36%	36%	11%	6%	—N/a	11%	—N/a	54%	46%
13–17 Sep 2023	Essential	Online	1,135	32%	31%	13%	8%	2%	8%	6%	49%	45%
4–10 Sep 2023	Roy Morgan	—N/a	1,382	37%	32%	13.5%	—N/a	—N/a	17.5%	—N/a	52.5%	47.5%
6–9 Sep 2023	Resolve Strategic	Online	1,604	34%	36%	12%	5%	2%	11%	—N/a	55.5%	44.5%
30 Aug – 4 Sep 2023	RedBridge Group	Online	1,001	36%	37%	13%	—N/a	—N/a	14%	—N/a	54.1%	45.9%
30 Aug – 3 Sep 2023	Essential	Online	1,151	32%	31%	15%	7%	2%	7%	6%	51%	43%
28 Aug – 3 Sep 2023	Roy Morgan	—N/a	1,404	37.5%	33.5%	13%	—N/a	—N/a	16%	—N/a	53%	47%
28 Aug– 1 Sep 2023	Newspoll	Online	1,200	37%	35%	13%	7%	—N/a	8%	—N/a	53%	47%
16–20 Aug 2023	Essential	Online	1,151	33%	33%	14%	5%	3%	7%	6%	51%	43%
10–14 Aug 2023	RedBridge Group	Online	1,010	32%	38%	10%	—N/a	—N/a	21%	—N/a	55.6%	44.4%
9–13 Aug 2023	Resolve Strategic	Online	1,603	33%	37%	11%	5%	2%	12%	—N/a	56%	44%
2–6 Aug 2023	Essential	Online	1,150	30%	33%	12%	8%	2%	8%	6%	52%	42%
19–23 Jul 2023	Essential	Online	1,150	32%	31%	14%	7%	1%	9%	6%	50%	45%
15 Jul 2023	LNP is re-elected in the 2023 Fadden by-election											
12–15 Jul 2023	Resolve Strategic	Online	1,610	30%	39%	11%	6%	1%	11%	—N/a	59%	41%
12–15 Jul 2023	Newspoll	Online	1,570	34%	36%	12%	7%	—N/a	11%	—N/a	55%	45%
5–9 Jul 2023	Essential	Online	2,248	32%	32%	14%	8%	1%	8%	5%	51%	44%
21–25 Jun 2023	Essential	Online	1,148	30%	32%	14%	7%	2%	11%	6%	52%	42%
16–24 Jun 2023	Newspoll	Online	2,303	35%	38%	11%	6%	—N/a	10%	—N/a	54%	46%
7–11 Jun 2023	Essential	Online	1,123	32%	32%	16%	5%	1%	9%	5%	52%	42%
6–11 Jun 2023	Resolve Strategic	Online	1,606	30%	40%	12%	6%	2%	10%	—N/a	60%	40%
31 May – 3 Jun 2023	Newspoll	Online	1,549	34%	38%	12%	6%	—N/a	10%	—N/a	55%	45%
24–28 May 2023	Essential	Online	1,138	31%	34%	15%	6%	2%	7%	5%	52%	43%
15–17 May 2023	Freshwater Strategy	Online	1,005	37%	34%	12%	—N/a	—N/a	17%	—N/a	52%	48%
10–14 May 2023	Essential	Online	1,080	31%	35%	14%	5%	1%	8%	5%	53%	42%
11–13 May 2023	Newspoll	Online	1,516	34%	38%	11%	7%	—N/a	10%	—N/a	55%	45%
10–13 May 2023	Resolve Strategic	Online	1,610	30%	42%	12%	5%	2%	8%	2%	61%	39%
26–30 Apr 2023	Essential	Online	1,130	32%	33%	14%	5%	2%	8%	5%	53%	41%
19–22 Apr 2023	Newspoll	Online	1,514	33%	38%	11%	7%	—N/a	11%	—N/a	56%	44%
12–16 Apr 2023	Essential	Online	1,136	31%	34%	14%	6%	3%	9%	4%	52%	43%
12–16 Apr 2023	Resolve Strategic	Online	1,609	28%	42%	12%	6%	1%	11%	—N/a	61.5%	38.5%
29 Mar – 2 Apr 2023	Essential	Online	1,133	30%	33%	14%	6%	2%	10%	5%	53%	42%
29 Mar – 1 Apr 2023	Newspoll	Online	1,500	33%	38%	10%	8%	—N/a	11%	—N/a	55%	45%
1 Apr 2023	Labor wins the 2023 Aston by-election											
15–20 Mar 2023	Essential	Online	1,124	31%	34%	14%	5%	2%	9%	5%	52%	43%
12–16 Mar 2023	Resolve Strategic	Online	1,600	30%	39%	13%	5%	1%	11%	—N/a	60%	40%
1–5 Mar 2023	Essential	Online	1,141	32%	32%	12%	7%	2%	10%	7%	49%	44%
27 Feb – 5 Mar 2023	Roy Morgan	—N/a	—N/a	33.5%	38%	11.5%	—N/a	—N/a	17%	—N/a	54.5%	45.5%
1–4 Mar 2023	Newspoll	Online	1,530	35%	37%	10%	7%	—N/a	11%	—N/a	54%	46%
20–26 Feb 2023	Roy Morgan	—N/a	—N/a	34.5%	37%	13.5%	—N/a	—N/a	15%	—N/a	56.5%	43.5%
15–19 Feb 2023	Essential	Online	1,044	30%	33%	14%	6%	3%	8%	8%	51%	42%
15–19 Feb 2023	Resolve Strategic	Online	1,604	31%	40%	10%	5%	1%	11%	—N/a	58%	42%
13–19 Feb 2023	Roy Morgan	Online/ Telephone	—N/a	33%	37%	13%	—N/a	—N/a	17%	—N/a	58.5%	41.5%
1–6 Feb 2023	Essential	Online	1,000	30%	33%	17%	6%	1%	15%	5%	55%	40%
1–4 Feb 2023	Newspoll	Online	1,512	34%	38%	11%	6%	1%	10%	—N/a	55%	45%
23–29 Jan 2023	Roy Morgan	—N/a	—N/a	33.5%	37.5%	11.5%	—N/a	—N/a	17.5%	—N/a	57%	43%
18–22 Jan 2023	Essential	Online	1,050	31%	34%	14%	8%	1%	7%	5%	53%	42%
17–22 Jan 2023	Resolve Strategic	Online	1,606	29%	42%	11%	6%	2%	11%	—N/a	60%	40%

=== 2022 ===
Date	Brand	Interview mode	Sample size	Primary vote							2pp vote	
Date	Brand	Interview mode	Sample size	L/NP	ALP	GRN	ONP	UAP	OTH	UND	ALP	L/NP
23 Dec 2022	Andrew Gee leaves the Nationals to become an independent											
16–18 Dec 2022	Freshwater Strategy	Online	1,209	37%	37%	12%	4%	1%	9%	—N/a	54%	46%
7–11 Dec 2022	Essential	Online	1,042	30%	35%	13%	6%	3%	8%	5%	51%	44%
30 Nov – 4 Dec 2022	Resolve Strategic	Online	1,611	30%	42%	11%	4%	2%	8%	—N/a	60%	40%
30 Nov – 3 Dec 2022	Newspoll	Online	1,508	35%	39%	11%	6%	1%	9%	—N/a	55%	45%
23–27 Nov 2022	Essential	Online	1,042	31%	33%	13%	—N/a	—N/a	17%	6%	51%	43%
27–30 Oct 2022	Newspoll-YouGov	Online	1,500	35%	38%	11%	6%	1%	9%	—N/a	55%	45%
26–30 Oct 2022	Resolve Strategic	Online	1,611	32%	39%	13%	4%	1%	11%	—N/a	58%	42%
5–9 Oct 2022	Resolve Strategic	Online	1,604	30%	39%	12%	5%	3%	11%	—N/a	58.5%	41.5%
14–18 Sep 2022	Resolve Strategic	Online	1,607	32%	39%	10%	6%	2%	11%	—N/a	56.5%	43.5%
31 Aug – 3 Sep 2022	Newspoll-YouGov	Online	1,505	31%	37%	13.5%	7%	2%	10%	—N/a	57%	43%
17–21 Aug 2022	Resolve Strategic	Online	2,011	28%	42%	12%	5%	2%	11%	—N/a	61%	39%
27–30 Jul 2022	Newspoll-YouGov	Online	1,508	33%	37%	12%	6%	2%	10%	—N/a	56%	44%
14–17 Jun 2022	Dynata	Online	1,001	31%	34%	12%	4%	4%	7%	9%	52.2%	47.8%
13–19 Jun 2022	Roy Morgan	Online/ telephone	1,401	37%	36%	11%	4%	0.5%	11.5%	—N/a	53%	47%
29 May 2022	Peter Dutton elected unopposed as Leader of the Liberal Party											
21 May 2022	Election			35.7%	32.6%	12.2%	5.0%	4.1%	10.4%	—	52.1%	47.9%

== Preferred prime minister and leadership polling ==
=== Graphical summary ===
The following graphical summaries illustrate results from opinion polling for preferred Prime Minister and their respective approval ratings based on data below that is documented in the tables.

==== Preferred prime minister and leadership polling table ====
===== 2025 =====
Date	Firm	Interview mode	Sample	Preferred prime minister				Albanese				Dutton			
Date	Firm	Interview mode	Sample	Albanese	Dutton	Don't Know	Net	Satisfied	Dissatisfied	Don't Know	Net	Satisfied	Dissatisfied	Don't Know	Net
2 May 2025	Ipsos	Online	2,574	48%	34%	18%	14%	36%	42%	22%	−6%	27%	51%	22%	−24%
29 Apr – 1 May 2025	Freshwater Strategy	Online	2,055	49%	39%	12%	10%	41%	44%	15%	−3%	35%	51%	14%	−16%
28 Apr – 1 May 2025	Newspoll	Online	1,270	51%	35%	14%	16%	42%	52%	6%	−10%	32%	60%	8%	−28%
24 Apr – 1 May 2025	YouGov	Online	3,003	51%	34%	15%	17%	43%	49%	8%	−6%	33%	57%	10%	−24%
27–30 Apr 2025	DemosAU	Online	4,100	46%	34%	20%	12%	—N/a	—N/a	—N/a	—N/a	—N/a	—N/a	—N/a	—N/a
24–28 Apr 2025	Spectre Strategy/Dynata	Online	2,000	47%	35%	27%	12%	—N/a	—N/a	—N/a	—N/a	—N/a	—N/a	—N/a	—N/a
23–28 Apr 2025	Resolve Strategic	Telephone/Online	2,010	47%	31%	22%	16%	45%	44%	11%	+1%	33%	57%	10%	−24%
24–27 Apr 2025	Essential	Online	2,163	—N/a	—N/a	—N/a	—N/a	44%	47%	9%	−3%	39%	51%	10%	−12%
21–24 Apr 2025	Newspoll	Online	1,254	51%	35%	14%	16%	43%	52%	5%	−9%	35%	59%	6%	−24%
22–23 Apr 2025	DemosAU	Online	1,073	43%	34%	23%	9%	—N/a	—N/a	—N/a	—N/a	—N/a	—N/a	—N/a	—N/a
17–22 Apr 2025	YouGov	Online	1,500	50%	35%	15%	15%	42%	49%	9%	−7%	36%	54%	10%	−18%
14–17 Apr 2025	Newspoll	Online	1,263	52%	36%	12%	16%	43%	52%	5%	−9%	35%	57%	8%	−22%
14–16 Apr 2025	Freshwater Strategy	Online	1,062	45%	41%	14%	4%	37%	48%	15%	−11%	37%	47%	16%	−10%
11–15 Apr 2025	YouGov	Online	1,506	48%	38%	14%	10%	43%	49%	8%	−6%	40%	50%	10%	−10%
9–14 Apr 2025	Essential	Online	2,142	—N/a	—N/a	—N/a	—N/a	44%	47%	9%	−3%	40%	48%	12%	−8%
9–13 Apr 2025	Resolve Strategic	Online	1,642	46%	30%	24%	16%	45%	43%	12%	+2%	34%	53%	13%	−19%
7–10 Apr 2025	Newspoll	Online	1,271	49%	38%	13%	11%	45%	49%	6%	−4%	37%	56%	7%	−19%
4–10 Apr 2025	YouGov	Online	1,515	48%	37%	15%	11%	45%	47%	8%	−2%	38%	53%	9%	−15%
31 Mar – 4 Apr 2025	Newspoll	Online	1,250	48%	40%	12%	8%	42%	53%	5%	−11%	38%	55%	7%	−17%
28 Mar – 3 Apr 2025	YouGov	Online	1,622	45%	38%	17%	7%	44%	50%	6%	−6%	38%	53%	9%	−15%
28–30 Mar 2025	Freshwater Strategy	Online	1,059	46%	45%	9%	1%	37%	49%	14%	−12%	37%	47%	16%	−10%
26–30 Mar 2025	Resolve Strategic	Online	3,237	42%	33%	25%	9%	39%	49%	12%	−10%	37%	47%	16%	−10%
26–30 Mar 2025	Essential	Online	1,100	—N/a	—N/a	—N/a	—N/a	41%	47%	12%	−6%	44%	46%	10%	−2%
27–29 Mar 2025	DemosAU	Online	1,013	39%	38%	23%	1%	—N/a	—N/a	—N/a	—N/a	—N/a	—N/a	—N/a	—N/a
27–29 Mar 2025	Newspoll	Online	1,249	49%	38%	13%	11%	43%	52%	5%	−9%	37%	55%	8%	−18%
17–21 Mar 2025	DemosAU	Online	1,006	40%	37%	23%	3%	—N/a	—N/a	—N/a	—N/a	—N/a	—N/a	—N/a	—N/a
14–19 Mar 2025	YouGov	Online	1,500	45%	40%	15%	5%	41%	50%	9%	−9%	42%	47%	11%	−5%
12–16 Mar 2025	Essential	Online	2,256	—N/a	—N/a	—N/a	—N/a	46%	45%	10%	+1%	41%	46%	13%	−5%
13–15 Mar 2025	Freshwater Strategy	Online	1,051	46%	42%	12%	4%	37%	47%	16%	−10%	35%	46%	19%	−11%
7–13 Mar 2025	YouGov	Online	1,526	45%	39%	16%	6%	43%	49%	8%	−6%	42%	48%	10%	−6%
5–7 Mar 2025	Freshwater Strategy	Online	830	39%	39%	22%	0%	—N/a	—N/a	—N/a	—N/a	—N/a	—N/a	—N/a	—N/a
3–7 Mar 2025	Newspoll	Online	1,255	47%	38%	15%	9%	41%	53%	6%	−12%	39%	53%	8%	−14%
28 Feb – 6 Mar 2025	YouGov	Online	1,504	45%	39%	16%	6%	42%	51%	7%	−9%	43%	47%	10%	−4%
26 Feb – 2 Mar 2025	Essential	Online	1,150	—N/a	—N/a	—N/a	—N/a	41%	49%	10%	−8%	41%	44%	15%	−3%
21–27 Feb 2025	YouGov	Online	1,501	42%	40%	18%	2%	40%	52%	8%	−12%	44%	46%	10%	−2%
20–25 Feb 2025	RedBridge/Accent	Online	1,002	—N/a	—N/a	—N/a	—N/a	30%	43%	27%	−13%	39%	43%	18%	−4%
21–23 Feb 2025	Freshwater Strategy	Online	1,038	45%	43%	12%	2%	35%	46%	19%	−11%	36%	44%	20%	−8%
18–23 Feb 2025	Resolve Strategic	Online	1,506	35%	39%	26%	4%	34%	56%	10%	−22%	45%	40%	15%	+5%
12–16 Feb 2025	Essential	Online	1,146	—N/a	—N/a	—N/a	—N/a	42%	48%	10%	−6%	41%	45%	14%	−4%
10–14 Feb 2025	Newspoll	Online	1,244	45%	40%	15%	5%	37%	58%	5%	−21%	41%	51%	8%	−10%
4–11 Feb 2025	RedBridge/Accent	Online	1,002	—N/a	—N/a	—N/a	—N/a	29%	45%	26%	−16%	31%	42%	27%	−11%
20–24 Jan 2025	Newspoll	Online	1,259	44%	41%	15%	3%	37%	57%	6%	−20%	40%	51%	9%	−11%
15–21 Jan 2025	Resolve Strategic	Online	1,616	34%	39%	27%	5%	33%	55%	12%	−22%	44%	38%	18%	+6%
17–19 Jan 2025	Freshwater Strategy	Online	1,063	43%	43%	14%	0%	32%	50%	18%	−18%	36%	40%	24%	−4%
15–19 Jan 2025	Essential	Online	1,132	—N/a	—N/a	—N/a	—N/a	45%	45%	10%	0%	42%	43%	15%	−1%
9–15 Jan 2025	YouGov	Online	1,504	44%	40%	16%	4%	40%	55%	5%	−15%	43%	49%	8%	−6%

===== 2024 =====
Date	Firm	Interview mode	Sample	Preferred prime minister				Albanese				Dutton			
Date	Firm	Interview mode	Sample	Albanese	Dutton	Don't Know	Net	Satisfied	Dissatisfied	Don't Know	Net	Satisfied	Dissatisfied	Don't Know	Net
13–15 Dec 2024	Freshwater Strategy	Online	1,051	46%	43%	11%	3%	34%	51%	15%	−17%	37%	40%	23%	−3%
11–15 Dec 2024	Essential	Online	1,151	—N/a	—N/a	—N/a	—N/a	39%	50%	11%	−11%	44%	41%	15%	+3%
4–8 Dec 2024	Resolve Strategic	Online	1,604	35%	35%	30%	0%	31%	57%	12%	−26%	40%	42%	18%	−2%
2–6 Dec 2024	Newspoll	Online	1,258	45%	38%	17%	7%	40%	54%	6%	−14%	39%	51%	10%	−12%
15–21 Nov 2024	YouGov	Online	1,515	42%	39%	19%	3%	36%	56%	8%	−20%	40%	48%	12%	−8%
13–18 Nov 2024	Essential	Online	1,206	—N/a	—N/a	—N/a	—N/a	43%	48%	10%	−5%	42%	41%	16%	+1%
15–17 Nov 2024	Freshwater Strategy	Online	1,046	43%	42%	15%	1%	33%	50%	17%	−17%	37%	41%	22%	−4%
5–10 Nov 2024	Resolve Strategic	Online	1,621	37%	37%	26%	0%	37%	51%	12%	−14%	45%	40%	15%	+5%
4–8 Nov 2024	Newspoll	Online	1,261	45%	41%	14%	4%	40%	55%	5%	−15%	40%	51%	9%	−11%
18–20 Oct 2024	Freshwater Strategy	Online	1,034	44%	43%	13%	1%	35%	49%	16%	−14%	37%	39%	24%	−2%
16–20 Oct 2024	Essential	Online	1,140	—N/a	—N/a	—N/a	—N/a	44%	48%	8%	−4%	45%	39%	16%	+6%
4–16 Oct 2024	RedBridge Group	Online	2,315	—N/a	—N/a	—N/a	—N/a	34%	53%	13%	−19%	39%	42%	19%	−3%
7–11 Oct 2024	Newspoll	Online	1,258	45%	37%	18%	8%	40%	54%	6%	−14%	38%	52%	10%	−14%
1–5 Oct 2024	Resolve Strategic	Online	1,606	38%	35%	27%	3%	35%	52%	13%	−17%	41%	41%	18%	0%
18–22 Sep 2024	Essential	Online	1,117	—N/a	—N/a	—N/a	—N/a	42%	47%	11%	−5%	42%	42%	16%	0%
16–20 Sep 2024	Newspoll	Online	1,249	46%	37%	17%	9%	43%	51%	6%	−8%	37%	52%	11%	−15%
13–19 Sep 2024	YouGov	Online	1,619	42%	39%	19%	3%	36%	58%	6%	−22%	40%	50%	10%	−10%
13–15 Sep 2024	Freshwater Strategy	Online	1,057	45%	41%	14% (Note: Total of 3% "Unsure" + 11% "Neither")	4%	34%	49%	17%	−15%	34%	38%	28%	−4%
3–7 Sep 2024	Resolve Strategic	Online	1,614	35%	34%	31%	1%	35%	53%	12%	−18%	41%	42%	17%	−1%
26–30 Aug 2024	Newspoll	Online	1,263	45%	37%	18%	8%	41%	54%	5%	−13%	39%	52%	9%	−13%
23–28 Aug 2024	YouGov	Online	1,543	43%	38%	19%	5%	41%	52%	7%	−11%	42%	47%	11%	−5%
20–24 Aug 2024	Essential	Online	1,129	—N/a	—N/a	—N/a	—N/a	40%	50%	10%	−10%	42%	41%	16%	+1%
16–18 Aug 2024	Freshwater Strategy	Online	1,061	45%	41%	14% (Note: Total of 3% "Unsure" + 11% "Neither")	4%	35%	45%	20%	−10%	37%	40%	23%	−3%
7–11 Aug 2024	Resolve Strategic	Online	1,607	35%	36%	29%	1%	34%	51%	15%	−17%	41%	38%	21%	+3%
5–9 Aug 2024	Newspoll	Online	1,266	46%	39%	15%	7%	43%	51%	6%	−8%	40%	50%	10%	−10%
24–28 Jul 2024	Essential	Online	1,137	—N/a	—N/a	—N/a	—N/a	43%	46%	11%	−3%	42%	41%	17%	+1%
19–21 Jul 2024	Freshwater Strategy	Online	1,060	45%	39%	16% (Note: Total of 4% "Unsure" + 12% "Neither")	6%	34%	48%	18%	−14%	36%	39%	25%	−3%
15–19 Jul 2024	Newspoll	Online	1,258	46%	39%	15%	6%	44%	51%	5%	−7%	41%	49%	10%	−8%
12–17 Jul 2024	YouGov	Online	1,528	45%	37%	18%	8%	42%	52%	6%	−10%	42%	46%	12%	−4%
10–13 Jul 2024	Resolve Strategic	Online	1,603	34%	35%	31%	1%	32%	54%	14%	−22%	39%	40%	21%	−1%
26–30 Jun 2024	Essential	Online	1,141	—N/a	—N/a	—N/a	—N/a	40%	49%	11%	−9%	41%	42%	17%	−1%
24–28 Jun 2024	Newspoll	Online	1,260	46%	38%	16%	8%	42%	53%	5%	−11%	38%	54%	8%	−16%
14–16 Jun 2024	Freshwater Strategy	Online	1,060	43%	41%	16% (Note: Total of 4% "Unsure" + 12% "Neither")	2%	34%	46%	20%	−12%	35%	40%	25%	−5%
11–15 Jun 2024	Resolve Strategic	Online	1,607	35%	36%	29%	1%	36%	50%	14%	−14%	42%	40%	19%	+2%
3–7 Jun 2024	Newspoll	Online	1,232	46%	38%	16%	8%	43%	50%	7%	−7%	39%	49%	12%	−10%
31 May – 4 Jun 2024	YouGov	Online	1,500	47%	36%	17%	9%	41%	53%	6%	–12%	38%	51%	11%	−13%
29 May – 2 Jun 2024	Essential	Online	1,160	—N/a	—N/a	—N/a	—N/a	43%	47%	11%	−4%	41%	42%	17%	−1%
17–19 May 2024	Freshwater Strategy	Online	1,056	46%	37%	16% (Note: Total of 4% "Unsure" + 12% "Neither")	9%	37%	46%	18%	−9%	31%	40%	29%	−9%
15–19 May 2024	Resolve Strategic	Online	1,602	40%	32%	28%	8%	39%	49%	12%	−10%	39%	42%	19%	−3%
16–18 May 2024	Newspoll	Online	1,280	52%	33%	15%	19%	47%	47%	6%	0%	38%	50%	12%	−12%
10–14 May 2024	YouGov	Online	1,506	44%	37%	19%	7%	41%	53%	6%	−12%	42%	48%	10%	−6%
17–21 Apr 2024	Essential	Online	1,145	—N/a	—N/a	—N/a	—N/a	43%	48%	9%	−5%	44%	41%	15%	+3%
17–21 Apr 2024	Resolve Strategic	Online	1,610	41%	32%	27%	9%	43%	45%	12%	−2%	40%	42%	17%	−2%
15–18 Apr 2024	Newspoll	Online	1,236	48%	35%	17%	13%	44%	50%	6%	−6%	36%	51%	13%	−15%
12–14 Apr 2024	Freshwater Strategy	Online	1,055	45%	39%	16% (Note: Total of 4% "Unsure" + 12% "Neither")	6%	38%	45%	17%	−7%	32%	41%	27%	−9%
22–27 Mar 2024	YouGov	Online	1,513	46%	34%	20%	12%	41%	52%	7%	−11%	38%	49%	13%	−11%
21–24 Mar 2024	Resolve Strategic	Online	1,610	40%	30%	30%	10%	38%	49%	13%	−11%	36%	44%	20%	−8%
18–22 Mar 2024	Newspoll	Online	1,223	48%	34%	18%	14%	44%	51%	5%	−7%	37%	52%	11%	−15%
8–10 Mar 2024	Freshwater Strategy	Online	1,051	47%	38%	15% (Note: Total of 4% "Unsure" + 11% "Neither")	9%	37%	45%	18%	−8%	30%	43%	27%	−13%
24 Feb – 5 Mar 2024	YouGov	Online	1,539	48%	34%	18%	14%	44%	50%	6%	−6%	39%	49%	12%	−10%
21–25 Feb 2024	Essential	Online	1,145	—N/a	—N/a	—N/a	—N/a	42%	47%	10%	−5%	40%	44%	16%	−4%
21–24 Feb 2024	Resolve Strategic	Online	1,603	39%	32%	29%	7%	41%	47%	12%	−6%	35%	45%	20%	−10%
19–23 Feb 2024	Newspoll	Online	1,245	47%	35%	18%	12%	43%	51%	6%	−8%	37%	51%	12%	−14%
16–18 Feb 2024	Freshwater Strategy	Online	1,049	42%	38%	19% (Note: Total of 3% "Unsure" + 16% "Neither")	4%	38%	45%	18%	−7%	32%	41%	28%	−9%
2–7 Feb 2024	YouGov	Online	1,502	45%	38%	17%	7%	—N/a	—N/a	—N/a	−16%	—N/a	—N/a	—N/a	−8%
31 Jan – 3 Feb 2024	Newspoll	Online	1,245	46%	35%	19%	11%	42%	51%	7%	−9%	37%	50%	13%	−13%
24–28 Jan 2024	Essential	Online	1,201	—N/a	—N/a	—N/a	—N/a	41%	47%	12%	−6%	38%	43%	19%	−5%
12–17 Jan 2024	YouGov	Online	1,532	45%	35%	20%	10%	—N/a	—N/a	—N/a	−13%	—N/a	—N/a	—N/a	−11%
10–11 Jan 2024	Freshwater Strategy	Online	1,007	47%	38%	15% (Note: Total of 3% "Unsure" + 12% "Neither")	9%	38%	43%	19%	−5%	31%	40%	30%	−9%

===== 2023 =====
Date	Firm	Interview mode	Sample	Preferred prime minister			Albanese				Dutton			
Date	Firm	Interview mode	Sample	Albanese	Dutton	Don't Know	Satisfied	Dissatisfied	Don't Know	Net	Satisfied	Dissatisfied	Don't Know	Net
15–17 Dec 2023	Freshwater Strategy	Online	1,109	43%	39%	18% (Note: Total of 5% "Unsure" + 13% "Neither")	37%	42%	20%	−5%	34%	36%	30%	−2%
11–15 Dec 2023	Newspoll	Online	1,219	46%	35%	19%	42%	50%	8%	−8%	39%	48%	13%	−9%
1–5 Dec 2023	YouGov	Online	1,555	46%	36%	18%	39%	55%	6%	−16%	39%	48%	13%	−9%
29 Nov – 3 Dec 2023	Resolve Strategic	Online	1,605	42%	28%	30%	37%	48%	15%	−11%	34%	42%	24%	−8%
22–26 Nov 2023	Essential	Online	1,151	—N/a	—N/a	—N/a	42%	47%	12%	−5%	39%	42%	19%	−3%
20–24 Nov 2023	Newspoll	Online	1,216	46%	35%	19%	40%	53%	7%	−13%	37%	50%	13%	−13%
10–14 Nov 2023	YouGov	Online	1,582	48%	34%	18%	43%	50%	7%	−7%	40%	47%	13%	−7%
1–5 Nov 2023	Resolve Strategic	Online	1,602	40%	27%	33%	39%	46%	15%	−7%	36%	40%	25%	−4%
30 Oct – 3 Nov 2023	Newspoll	Online	1,220	46%	36%	18%	42%	52%	6%	−10%	37%	50%	13%	−13%
11–14 Oct 2023	Essential	Online	1,125	—N/a	—N/a	—N/a	46%	43%	11%	+3%	36%	43%	21%	−7%
4–12 Oct 2023	Newspoll	Online	2,638	51%	31%	18%	46%	46%	8%	0%	35%	53%	12%	−18%
6–10 Oct 2023	YouGov	Online	1,519	50%	34%	16%	45%	48%	7%	−3%	38%	50%	12%	−12%
3–6 Oct 2023	Newspoll	Online	1,225	50%	33%	17%	45%	46%	9%	−1%	37%	50%	13%	−13%
22 Sep – 4 Oct 2023	Resolve Strategic	Online	1,604	47%	25%	28%	43%	43%	14%	0%	30%	45%	25%	−15%
25–29 Sep 2023	YouGov	Online	1,563	50%	33%	17%	—N/a	—N/a	—N/a	—N/a	—N/a	—N/a	—N/a	—N/a
22–24 Sep 2023	Freshwater Strategy	Online	1,003	46%	37%	17% (Note: Total of 3% "Unsure" + 14% "Neither")	38%	41%	21%	−3%	30%	40%	30%	−10%
18–22 Sep 2023	Newspoll	Online	1,239	50%	30%	20%	47%	44%	9%	+3%	32%	52%	16%	−20%
6–9 Sep 2023	Resolve Strategic	Online	1,604	43%	28%	29%	40%	47%	13%	−7%	35%	43%	22%	−8%
30 Aug – 3 Sep 2023	Essential	Online	1,151	—N/a	—N/a	—N/a	46%	43%	10%	+3%	38%	43%	19%	−5%
28 Aug – 1 Sep 2023	Newspoll	Online	1,200	50%	31%	19%	46%	47%	7%	−1%	38%	49%	13%	−11%
9–13 Aug 2023	Resolve Strategic	Online	1,603	46%	25%	29%	44%	42%	14%	+2%	31%	44%	24%	−13%
19–23 Jul 2023	Essential	Online	1,150	—N/a	—N/a	—N/a	48%	41%	11%	+7%	37%	43%	20%	−6%
12–15 Jul 2023	Resolve Strategic	Online	1,610	51%	21%	28%	51%	34%	15%	+17%	31%	47%	23%	−16%
12–15 Jul 2023	Newspoll	Online	1,570	54%	29%	17%	52%	41%	7%	+11%	36%	49%	15%	−13%
16–24 Jun 2023	Newspoll	Online	2,303	52%	32%	16%	52%	42%	6%	+10%	38%	49%	13%	−11%
29 May – 12 Jun 2023	CT Group	Online	3,000	—N/a	—N/a	—N/a	42%	36%	22%	+6%	—N/a	—N/a	—N/a	—N/a
6–11 Jun 2023	Resolve Strategic	Online	1,606	53%	22%	25%	53%	35%	13%	+18%	28%	48%	24%	−20%
31 May – 3 Jun 2023	Newspoll	Online	1,549	55%	28%	17%	55%	37%	8%	+18%	36%	50%	14%	−14%
15–17 May 2023	Freshwater Strategy	Online	1,005	51%	33%	16% (Note: Total of 5% "Unsure" + 11% "Neither")	42%	37%	21%	+5%	30%	42%	28%	−12%
10–14 May 2023	Essential	Online	1,125	—N/a	—N/a	—N/a	54%	35%	11%	+19%	36%	45%	19%	−9%
11–13 May 2023	Newspoll	Online	1,516	56%	29%	15%	57%	38%	5%	+19%	36%	51%	13%	−15%
10–13 May 2023	Resolve Strategic	Online	1,610	53%	20%	27%	56%	29%	14%	+27%	28%	49%	23%	−21%
19–22 Apr 2023	Newspoll	Online	1,514	54%	28%	18%	53%	37%	10%	+16%	33%	52%	15%	−19%
12–16 Apr 2023	Essential	Online	1,136	—N/a	—N/a	—N/a	51%	36%	12%	+15%	36%	44%	20%	−8%
12–16 Apr 2023	Resolve Strategic	Online	1,609	55%	21%	24%	56%	29%	14%	+27%	26%	54%	19%	−28%
29 Mar – 2 Apr 2023	Essential	Online	1,133	—N/a	—N/a	—N/a	52%	35%	13%	+17%	—N/a	—N/a	—N/a	—N/a
29 Mar – 1 Apr 2023	Newspoll	Online	1,500	58%	26%	16%	56%	35%	9%	+21%	35%	48%	21%	−13%
12–16 Mar 2023	Resolve Strategic	Online	1,600	51%	22%	27%	55%	31%	13%	+24%	32%	44%	25%	−12%
1–4 Mar 2023	Newspoll	Online	1,530	54%	28%	18%	55%	38%	7%	+17%	37%	48%	15%	−11%
15–21 Feb 2023	Morning Consult	—N/a	—N/a	—N/a	—N/a	—N/a	57%	31%	12%	+26%	—N/a	—N/a	—N/a	—N/a
15–19 Feb 2023	Essential	Online	1,044	—N/a	—N/a	—N/a	53%	34%	13%	+19%	—N/a	—N/a	—N/a	—N/a
15–19 Feb 2023	Resolve Strategic	Online	1,604	55%	23%	22%	56%	30%	13%	+26%	29%	45%	26%	−16%
1–4 Feb 2023	Newspoll	Online	1,512	56%	26%	18%	57%	33%	10%	+24%	36%	46%	18%	−10%
18–22 Jan 2023	Essential	Online	1,050	—N/a	—N/a	—N/a	55%	31%	13%	+24%	—N/a	—N/a	—N/a	—N/a
17–22 Jan 2023	Resolve Strategic	Online	1,606	55%	20%	25%	60%	25%	15%	+35%	28%	46%	26%	−18%

===== 2022 =====
Date	Firm	Interview mode	Sample	Preferred prime minister			Albanese				Dutton			
Date	Firm	Interview mode	Sample	Albanese	Dutton	Don't Know	Satisfied	Dissatisfied	Don't Know	Net	Satisfied	Dissatisfied	Don't Know	Net
16–18 Dec 2022	Freshwater Strategy	Online	1,209	55%	29%	16% (Note: Total of 4% "Unsure" + 12% "Neither")	–	–	–	–	–	–	–	–
7–11 Dec 2022	Essential	Online	1,042	–	–	–	60%	27%	13%	+33%	–	–	–	–
30 Nov – 4 Dec 2022	Resolve Strategic	Online	1,611	54%	19%	27%	60%	24%	16%	+36%	28%	43%	29%	–15%
30 Nov – 3 Dec 2022	Newspoll	Online	1,508	59%	24%	17%	62%	29%	9%	+33%	36%	45%	19%	–9%
16–22 Nov 2022	Morning Consult	Online	—N/a	–	–	–	56%	31%	25%	+25%	–	–	–	–
9–14 Nov 2022	Essential	Online	1,035	–	–	–	60%	27%	13%	+33%	–	–	–	–
27–30 Oct 2022	Newspoll	Online	1,500	54%	27%	19%	59%	33%	8%	+26%	39%	46%	15%	–7%
26–30 Oct 2022	Resolve Strategic	Online	1,611	53%	19%	28%	57%	28%	16%	+29%	29%	41%	30%	–12%
13–16 Oct 2022	Freshwater Strategic (Note: Polling conducted in NSW.)	Online	1,042	–	–	–	50%	26%	24%	+24%	33%	34%	33%	–1%
11–16 Oct 2022	Essential	Online	1,122	–	–	–	58%	26%	15%	+32%	–	–	–	–
5–9 Oct 2022	Resolve Strategic	Online	1,604	53%	18%	29%	60%	25%	15%	+35%	30%	41%	28%	–11%
14–18 Sep 2022	Resolve Strategic	Online	1,607	53%	19%	28%	60%	24%	16%	+36%	28%	40%	32%	–12%
31 Aug – 4 Sep 2022	Essential	Online	1,070	—	—	—	59%	25%	15%	+34%	—	—	—	—
31 Aug – 3 Sep 2022	Newspoll	Online	1,505	61%	22%	17%	61%	29%	10%	+32%	35%	43%	22%	–8%
17–21 Aug 2022	Resolve Strategic	Online	2,011	55%	17%	28%	61%	22%	17%	+39%	30%	37%	32%	–7%
3–7 Aug 2022	Essential	Online	1,075	—	—	—	55%	28%	18%	+27%	—	—	—	—
27–30 Jul 2022	[Newspoll]	Online	1,508	59%	25%	16%	61%	26%	13%	+35%	37%	41%	22%	–4%
7–11 Jul 2022	Essential	Online	1,097	—	—	—	56%	24%	20%	+32%	—	—	—	—
8–12 Jun 2022	Essential	Online	1,087	—	—	—	59%	18%	23%	+41%	—	—	—	—
23–31 May 2022	Morning Consult	Online	3,770	—	—	—	51%	24%	25%	+27%	—	—	—	—

== Sub-national polling ==
=== New South Wales ===
==== Graphical summary ====
===== Polling =====
Date	Firm	Sample size	Primary vote							2pp vote (Note: Resolve Strategic 2PP calculated based on preference flows at the 2022 Australian federal election in New South Wales.)	
Date	Firm	Sample size	L/NP	ALP	GRN	ONP	UAP	IND	OTH	ALP	L/NP
3 May 2025	Election		31.5%	35.2%	11.1%	6.0%	1.8%	9.7%	5.7%	55.3%	44.7%
24 Apr – 1 May 2025	YouGov	915	32%	30%	14%	9%	—N/a	—N/a	15%	51%	49%
27–30 Apr 2025	DemosAU	1,291	35%	31%	10%	9%	—N/a	—N/a	15%	50%	50%
24–29 Apr 2025	RedBridge Group	321	35%	34%	8%	—N/a	—N/a	—N/a	23%	51%	49%
24–28 Apr 2025	Spectre Strategy/Dynata (Note: Spectre Strategy sum is greater than 100 due to rounding.)	—N/a	34%	30%	14%	10%	—N/a	—N/a	12%	50%	50%
23–28 Apr 2025	Resolve Strategic	638	34%	33%	11%	7%	—N/a	11%	4%	51%	49%
18–22 Apr 2025	YouGov	440	26%	35%	16%	10%	—N/a	—N/a	13%	57%	43%
27 Mar – 17 Apr 2025	Newspoll	1,591	36%	34%	11%	7%	—N/a	—N/a	12%	52%	48%
11–15 Apr 2025	YouGov	487	33%	32%	17%	5%	—N/a	—N/a	13%	54%	46%
9–13 Apr 2025	Resolve Strategic	522	34%	31%	12%	6%	—N/a	14%	3%	50%	50%
4–10 Apr 2025	YouGov	495	32%	30%	17%	10%	—N/a	—N/a	11%	51%	49%
28 Mar – 3 Apr 2025	YouGov	513	35%	29%	17%	5%	—N/a	—N/a	14%	50%	50%
26–30 Mar 2025	Resolve Strategic	1,027	40%	30%	11%	6%	—N/a	10%	4%	47%	53%
24–26 Mar 2025	DemosAU	1,013	38%	30%	12%	9%	—N/a	—N/a	11%	49%	51%
14–19 Mar 2025	YouGov	773	36%	28%	16%	7%	—N/a	—N/a	13%	49.5%	50.5%
17 Jan – 15 Mar 2025	Freshwater Strategy	947	42%	30%	13%	—N/a	—N/a	—N/a	15%	48%	52%
7–13 Mar 2025	YouGov	482	36%	28%	15.5%	7%	—N/a	—N/a	13.5%	49.5%	50.5%
20 Jan – 7 Mar 2025	Newspoll	1,149	38%	31%	12%	7%	—N/a	—N/a	12%	50%	50%
28 Feb – 6 Mar 2025	YouGov	475	35%	29%	15%	7%	—N/a	—N/a	14%	50%	50%
21–27 Feb 2025	YouGov	506	35%	26%	15%	12%	—N/a	—N/a	12%	48.5%	51.5%
18–23 Feb 2025	Resolve Strategic	478	38%	24%	13%	11%	—N/a	10%	3%	45.5%	54.5%
4–11 Feb 2025	RedBridge/Accent	305	43%	33%	10%	—N/a	—N/a	—N/a	14%	47%	53%
15–21 Jan 2025	Resolve Strategic	513	39%	27%	13%	5%	—N/a	10%	5%	47.5%	52.5%
4–8 Dec 2024	Resolve Strategic	509	38%	27%	13%	9%	—N/a	11%	2%	47.5%	52.5%
7 Oct – 6 Dec 2024	Newspoll	1,193	40%	32%	10%	7%	—N/a	—N/a	11%	50%	50%
5–10 Nov 2024	Resolve Strategic	515	38%	30%	10%	6%	—N/a	13%	3%	50.5%	49.5%
1–5 Oct 2024	Resolve Strategic	510	39%	31%	10%	5%	—N/a	11%	4%	49.5%	50.5%
15 Jul – 20 Sep 2024	Newspoll	1,592	38%	30%	12%	7%	—N/a	—N/a	13%	49%	51%
3–7 Sep 2024	Resolve Strategic	513	37%	30%	12%	6%	1%	12%	3%	50.5%	49.5%
7–11 Aug 2024	Resolve Strategic	510	39%	29%	12%	4%	2%	9%	4%	49%	51%
10–13 Jul 2024	Resolve Strategic	509	39%	27%	13%	6%	1%	12%	2%	48.5%	51.5%
15 Apr – 26 Jun 2024	Newspoll	1,567	40%	33%	11%	6%	—N/a	—N/a	10%	49%	51%
11–16 Jun 2024	Resolve Strategic	510	37%	29%	12%	5%	2%	12%	3%	50%	50%
15–19 May 2024	Resolve Strategic	511	35%	31%	10%	7%	1%	13%	2%	51%	49%
17–21 Apr 2024	Resolve Strategic	511	35%	31%	11%	6%	1%	12%	4%	51.5%	48.5%
21–24 Mar 2024	Resolve Strategic	511	35%	33%	11%	6%	2%	12%	2%	52.5%	47.5%
31 Jan – 22 Mar 2024	Newspoll	1,152	38%	32%	12%	7%	—N/a	—N/a	11%	50%	50%
21–24 Feb 2024	Resolve Strategic	509	37%	34%	10%	4%	1%	10%	4%	52%	48%
31 Oct – 15 Dec 2023	Newspoll	1,139	37%	32%	13%	7%	—N/a	—N/a	11%	51%	49%
29 Nov – 3 Dec 2023	Resolve Strategic	510	35%	35%	12%	5%	1%	10%	2%	54.5%	45.5%
1–5 Nov 2023	Resolve Strategic	509	31%	37%	14%	6%	1%	8%	4%	58%	42%
28 Aug – 12 Oct 2023	Newspoll	1,565	34%	38%	13%	5%	—N/a	—N/a	10%	56%	44%
22 Sep – 4 Oct 2023	Resolve Strategic	1,502	32%	34%	13%	8%	2%	10%	2%	55%	45%
6–9 Sep 2023	Resolve Strategic	509	36%	39%	8%	6%	2%	7%	3%	54%	46%
9–12 Aug 2023	Resolve Strategic	509	34%	42%	11%	4%	1%	8%	1%	58%	42%
12–15 Jul 2023	Resolve Strategic	511	32%	39%	10%	9%	0%	8%	2%	56.5%	43.5%
6–11 Jun 2023	Resolve Strategic	510	33%	39%	10%	6%	1%	9%	2%	56.5%	43.5%
14–16 May 2023	Resolve Strategic	511	30%	46%	9%	5%	1%	7%	2%	61%	39%
12–16 Apr 2023	Resolve Strategic	511	30%	43%	9%	6%	1%	8%	2%	59.5%	40.5%
1 Feb – 3 Apr 2023	Newspoll	1,414	35%	38%	10%	7%	—N/a	—N/a	10%	55%	45%
12–16 Mar 2023	Resolve Strategic	508	35%	39%	11%	5%	1%	7%	2%	55.5%	44.5%
15–19 Feb 2023	Resolve Strategic	509	31%	41%	10%	6%	1%	9%	2%	58.5%	41.5%
17–22 Jan 2023	Resolve Strategic	512	31%	40%	10%	8%	2%	7%	2%	57.5%	42.5%
30 Nov – 4 Dec 2022	Resolve Strategic	512	33%	38%	12%	5%	3%	8%	2%	56.5%	43.5%
27 Jul – 3 Dec 2022	Newspoll	1,817	35%	38%	11%	6%	—N/a	—N/a	10%	55%	45%
26–30 Oct 2022	Resolve Strategic	512	32%	41%	10%	6%	1%	8%	2%	57.9%	42.1%
5–9 Oct 2022	Resolve Strategic	509	32%	39%	12%	6%	3%	7%	2%	57%	43%
14–18 Sep 2022	Resolve Strategic	510	29%	41%	9%	7%	3%	9%	3%	58.5%	41.5%
17–21 Aug 2022	Resolve Strategic	639	29%	42%	11%	5%	2%	8%	3%	60.5%	39.5%
21 Jun 2022	Roy Morgan	—N/a	—N/a	—N/a	—N/a	—N/a	—N/a	—N/a	—N/a	46.5%	53.5%
21 May 2022	Election		36.5%	33.4%	10%	4.8%	4%	7.6%	3.7%	51.4%	48.6%

=== Victoria ===
==== Graphical summary ====
===== Polling =====
Date	Firm	Sample size	Primary vote							2pp vote (Note: Resolve Strategic 2PP calculated based on preference flows at the 2022 Australian federal election in Victoria.)	
Date	Firm	Sample size	L/NP	ALP	GRN	UAP	ONP	IND	OTH	ALP	L/NP
3 May 2025	Election		32.2%	34.0%	13.6%	1.2%	5.8%	7.5%	5.7%	56.3%	43.7%
24 Apr – 1 May 2025	YouGov	800	31%	29%	15%	—N/a	8%	—N/a	17%	52%	48%
27–30 Apr 2025	DemosAU	1,029	32%	31%	12%	—N/a	9%	—N/a	16%	53%	47%
24–29 Apr 2025	RedBridge Group	255	35%	32%	15%	—N/a	—N/a	—N/a	18%	53%	47%
24–28 Apr 2025	Spectre Strategy/Dynata	—N/a	35%	31%	13%	—N/a	10%	—N/a	11%	49%	51%
23–28 Apr 2025	Resolve Strategic	507	33%	29%	16%	—N/a	7%	9%	6%	52%	48%
18–22 Apr 2025	YouGov	381	35%	31%	17%	—N/a	7%	—N/a	10%	52%	48%
27 Mar – 17 Apr 2025	Newspoll	1,263	38%	33%	13%	—N/a	5%	—N/a	11%	53%	47%
11–15 Apr 2025	YouGov	408	35%	30%	14%	—N/a	4%	—N/a	17%	50%	50%
4–15 Apr 2025	RedBridge/Accent	478	40%	30%	13%	—N/a	—N/a	—N/a	17%	49%	51%
9–13 Apr 2025	Resolve Strategic	414	36%	29%	13%	—N/a	4%	9%	9%	49.5%	50.5%
4–10 Apr 2025	YouGov	350	35%	34%	13%	—N/a	5%	—N/a	13%	51%	49%
28 Mar – 3 Apr 2025	YouGov	409	37%	34%	10%	—N/a	5%	—N/a	14%	50%	50%
26–30 Mar 2025	Resolve Strategic	817	35%	27%	14%	—N/a	6%	10%	7%	49.5%	50.5%
17–21 Mar 2025	DemosAU	1,006	34%	29%	15%	—N/a	8%	—N/a	14%	51%	49%
14–19 Mar 2025	YouGov	474	42%	29%	13%	—N/a	5%	—N/a	11%	47.5%	52.5%
17 Jan – 15 Mar 2025	Freshwater Strategy	842	37%	29%	15%	—N/a	—N/a	—N/a	19%	50%	50%
7–13 Mar 2025	YouGov	384	41.5%	28.5%	13%	—N/a	5%	—N/a	12%	47.5%	52.5%
20 Jan – 7 Mar 2025	Newspoll	943	39%	30%	15%	—N/a	4%	—N/a	12%	51%	49%
28 Feb – 6 Mar 2025	YouGov	379	39%	30%	9%	—N/a	6%	—N/a	16%	48%	52%
21–27 Feb 2025	YouGov	352	37%	31%	14%	—N/a	5%	—N/a	13%	50%	50%
20–25 Feb 2025	RedBridge/Accent	—N/a	—N/a	—N/a	—N/a	—N/a	—N/a	—N/a	—N/a	43%	57%
18–23 Feb 2025	Resolve Strategic	380	38%	24%	15%	—N/a	6%	11%	6%	48%	52%
4–11 Feb 2025	RedBridge/Accent	261	51%	31%	8%	—N/a	—N/a	—N/a	10%	42%	58%
15–21 Jan 2025	Resolve Strategic	407	38%	25%	13%	—N/a	6%	12%	6%	47.5%	52.5%
4–8 Dec 2024	Resolve Strategic	404	38%	26%	12%	—N/a	5%	12%	7%	48%	52%
7 Oct – 6 Dec 2024	Newspoll	947	39%	30%	14%	—N/a	5%	—N/a	12%	50%	50%
5–10 Nov 2024	Resolve Strategic	409	38%	31%	14%	—N/a	4%	10%	2%	52.5%	47.5%
1–5 Oct 2024	Resolve Strategic	405	37%	29%	14%	—N/a	5%	9%	5%	50.5%	49.5%
15 Jul – 20 Sep 2024	Newspoll	1,263	38%	31%	13%	—N/a	6%	—N/a	12%	52%	48%
3–7 Sep 2024	Resolve Strategic	407	36%	29%	13%	2%	4%	12%	4%	51.5%	48.5%
7–11 Aug 2024	Resolve Strategic	405	33%	30%	13%	1%	6%	13%	3%	53.5%	46.5%
10–13 Jul 2024	Resolve Strategic	404	36%	30%	15%	2%	5%	11%	2%	52.5%	47.5%
15 Apr – 26 Jun 2024	Newspoll	393	36%	33%	15%	—N/a	6%	—N/a	10%	54%	46%
11–16 Jun 2024	Resolve Strategic	405	32%	29%	15%	1%	7%	11%	4%	54%	46%
15–19 May 2024	Resolve Strategic	406	34%	29%	14%	2%	6%	12%	2%	52.5%	47.5%
17–21 Apr 2024	Resolve Strategic	406	34%	32%	11%	4%	5%	12%	2%	52.5%	47.5%
21–24 Mar 2024	Resolve Strategic	406	35%	35%	13%	2%	5%	9%	2%	54.5%	45.5%
31 Jan – 22 Mar 2024	Newspoll	926	34%	33%	16%	—N/a	5%	—N/a	12%	55%	45%
21–24 Feb 2024	Resolve Strategic	404	34%	32%	13%	2%	4%	8%	7%	54%	46%
31 Oct – 15 Dec 2023	Newspoll	917	34%	34%	15%	—N/a	5%	—N/a	12%	55%	45%
29 Nov – 3 Dec 2023	Resolve Strategic	405	34%	37%	11%	1%	4%	9%	4%	55.5%	44.5%
1–5 Nov 2023	Resolve Strategic	404	25%	37%	14%	3%	8%	9%	4%	60.5%	39.5%
28 Aug – 12 Oct 2023	Newspoll	887	35%	36%	13%	—N/a	4%	—N/a	12%	54%	46%
22 Sep – 4 Oct 2023	Resolve Strategic	1,192	30%	39%	11%	2%	6%	8%	2%	58%	42%
6–9 Sep 2023	Resolve Strategic	404	32%	40%	13%	2%	3%	8%	2%	58.5%	41.5%
9–12 Aug 2023	Resolve Strategic	404	30%	38%	14%	1%	3%	10%	4%	59.5%	40.5%
12–15 Jul 2023	Resolve Strategic	406	26%	42%	13%	2%	5%	9%	3%	58%	42%
6–11 Jun 2023	Resolve Strategic	405	25%	40%	15%	3%	6%	7%	4%	62.5%	37.5%
14–16 May 2023	Resolve Strategic	406	25%	48%	12%	1%	4%	7%	2%	66%	34%
12–16 Apr 2023	Resolve Strategic	406	32%	39%	11%	2%	3%	11%	3%	57.5%	42.5%
1 Feb – 3 Apr 2023	Newspoll	1,193	33%	41%	11%	—N/a	4%	—N/a	11%	58%	42%
12–16 Mar 2023	Resolve Strategic	403	29%	43%	9%	1%	6%	8%	4%	60%	40%
15–19 Feb 2023	Resolve Strategic	404	27%	40%	14%	2%	3%	11%	2%	62%	38%
17–22 Jan 2023	Resolve Strategic	406	31%	41%	13%	2%	3%	7%	4%	59.5%	40.5%
30 Nov – 4 Dec 2022	Resolve Strategic	406	27%	46%	11%	2%	2%	7%	5%	63.5%	36.5%
27 Jul – 3 Dec 2022	Newspoll	1,448	33%	37%	13%	—N/a	5%	—N/a	12%	57%	43%
26–30 Oct 2022	Resolve Strategic	406	32%	39%	12%	2%	2%	11%	3%	58%	42%
5–9 Oct 2022	Resolve Strategic	404	30%	40%	10%	5%	4%	9%	3%	58%	42%
14–18 Sep 2022	Resolve Strategic	405	30%	38%	14%	2%	3%	8%	5%	59.5%	40.5%
17–21 Aug 2022	Resolve Strategic	507	24%	42%	11%	3%	5%	10%	5%	63%	37%
21 Jun 2022	Roy Morgan	—N/a	—N/a	—N/a	—N/a	—N/a	—N/a	—N/a	—N/a	60.5%	39.5%
21 May 2022	Election		33.1%	32.9%	13.7%	4.7%	3.8%	6.5%	5.3%	54.8%	45.2%

=== Queensland ===
==== Graphical summary ====
===== Polling =====
Date	Firm	Sample size	Primary vote							2pp vote (Note: Resolve Strategic 2PP calculated based on preference flows at the 2022 Australian federal election in Queensland.)	
Date	Firm	Sample size	LNP	ALP	GRN	ONP	UAP	IND	OTH	LNP	ALP
3 May 2025	Election		34.9%	31.0%	11.8%	7.8%	3.3%	11.2%	—	50.6%	49.45
24 Apr – 1 May 2025	YouGov	631	35%	27%	17%	7%	—N/a	—N/a	14%	51%	49%
27–30 Apr 2025	DemosAU	858	39%	26%	13%	7%	—N/a	—N/a	15%	54%	46%
24–29 Apr 2025	RedBridge Group	206	43%	27%	10%	—N/a	—N/a	—N/a	20%	57%	43%
24–28 Apr 2025	Spectre Strategy/Dynata	—N/a	36%	28%	15%	11%	—N/a	—N/a	10%	53%	47%
23–28 Apr 2025	Resolve Strategic	409	37%	26%	15%	9%	—N/a	8%	5%	54%	46%
18–22 Apr 2025	YouGov	320	37%	25%	12%	13%	—N/a	—N/a	13%	54%	46%
27 Mar – 17 Apr 2025	Newspoll	1,053	40%	29%	12%	8%	—N/a	—N/a	11%	54%	46%
11–15 Apr 2025	YouGov	293	41%	30%	7%	8%	—N/a	—N/a	14%	57.5%	42.5%
9–13 Apr 2025	Resolve Strategic	334	38%	29%	13%	8%	—N/a	8%	4%	53%	47%
4–10 Apr 2025	YouGov	317	42%	25%	11%	7%	—N/a	—N/a	15%	58%	42%
28 Mar – 3 Apr 2025	YouGov	332	38%	24%	13%	12%	—N/a	—N/a	13%	56%	44%
26–30 Mar 2025	Resolve Strategic	658	39%	25%	13%	12%	—N/a	6%	6%	56.5%	43.5%
14–19 Mar 2025	YouGov	378	55%	27%	6%	5%	—N/a	—N/a	7%	63%	37%
17 Jan – 15 Mar 2025	Freshwater Strategy	665	42%	25%	15%	—N/a	—N/a	—N/a	18%	55.5%	44.5%
7–13 Mar 2025	YouGov	312	34%	29.5%	15.5%	10.5%	—N/a	—N/a	10.5%	50.5%	49.5%
20 Jan – 7 Mar 2025	Newspoll	786	45%	28%	11%	7%	—N/a	—N/a	9%	57%	43%
28 Feb – 6 Mar 2025	YouGov	307	34%	33%	17%	8%	—N/a	—N/a	8%	47%	53%
21–27 Feb 2025	YouGov	302	47%	23%	8%	10%	—N/a	—N/a	12%	60.5%	39.5%
18–23 Feb 2025	Resolve Strategic	306	41%	25%	12%	8%	—N/a	9%	4%	56.5%	43.5%
10–14 Feb 2025	DemosAU	1,004	39%	31%	12%	10%	—N/a	—N/a	8%	53%	47%
4–11 Feb 2025	RedBridge/Accent	190	42%	29%	16%	—N/a	—N/a	—N/a	13%	51%	49%
15–21 Jan 2025	Resolve Strategic	329	42%	26%	11%	7%	—N/a	7%	6%	56.5%	43.5%
4–8 Dec 2024	Resolve Strategic	326	38%	25%	13%	9%	—N/a	8%	7%	55%	45%
7 Oct – 6 Dec 2024	Newspoll	790	41%	29%	12%	8%	—N/a	—N/a	10%	53%	47%
5–10 Nov 2024	Resolve Strategic	330	43%	29%	8%	6%	—N/a	8%	6%	56%	44%
26 Oct 2024	State Election		41.5%	32.6%	9.9%	8.0%	—N/a	1.7%	6.3%	53.8%	46.2%
4–16 Oct 2024	RedBridge Group	2,315	41%	28%	13%	10%	—N/a	—N/a	8%	54.5%	45.5%
1–5 Oct 2024	Resolve Strategic	327	42%	25%	12%	6%	—N/a	13%	2%	55.5%	44.5%
15 Jul – 20 Sep 2024	Newspoll	1,053	43%	30%	12%	8%	—N/a	—N/a	7%	54%	46%
3–7 Sep 2024	Resolve Strategic	328	40%	27%	13%	9%	2%	9%	1%	53.5%	46.5%
7–11 Aug 2024	Resolve Strategic	327	41%	24%	11%	10%	2%	8%	4%	56%	44%
10–13 Jul 2024	Resolve Strategic	326	44%	23%	10%	7%	0%	14%	1%	57.5%	42.5%
15 Apr – 26 Jun 2024	Newspoll	328	40%	27%	13%	10%	—N/a	—N/a	10%	54%	46%
11–16 Jun 2024	Resolve Strategic	327	40%	24%	13%	8%	1%	11%	3%	54.5%	45.5%
15–19 May 2024	Resolve Strategic	327	43%	26%	12%	8%	3%	8%	1%	55.5%	44.5%
17–21 Apr 2024	Resolve Strategic	327	40%	25%	14%	9%	2%	8%	2%	54%	46%
21–24 Mar 2024	Resolve Strategic	327	36%	30%	14%	7%	1%	9%	2%	49%	51%
31 Jan – 22 Mar 2024	Newspoll	772	41%	29%	12%	7%	—N/a	—N/a	11%	53%	47%
21–24 Feb 2024	Resolve Strategic	326	44%	32%	9%	9%	2%	3%	1%	54.5%	45.5%
31 Oct – 15 Dec 2023	Newspoll	764	41%	27%	12%	8%	—N/a	—N/a	12%	54%	46%
29 Nov – 3 Dec 2023	Resolve Strategic	326	38%	33%	12%	8%	2%	8%	0%	49.5%	50.5%
1–5 Nov 2023	Resolve Strategic	326	36%	31%	12%	11%	1%	6%	3%	50%	50%
28 Aug – 12 Oct 2023	Newspoll	887	39%	30%	11%	9%	—N/a	—N/a	11%	52%	48%
22 Sep – 4 Oct 2023	Resolve Strategic	961	34%	33%	11%	9%	1%	10%	1%	48%	52%
6–9 Sep 2023	Resolve Strategic	326	35%	29%	16%	9%	2%	7%	2%	49%	51%
9–12 Aug 2023	Resolve Strategic	326	40%	28%	9%	8%	2%	10%	3%	54%	46%
12–15 Jul 2023	Resolve Strategic	327	36%	33%	12%	6%	2%	10%	1%	48%	52%
6–11 Jun 2023	Resolve Strategic	327	31%	38%	10%	11%	2%	7%	1%	45%	55%
14–16 May 2023	Resolve Strategic	327	39%	27%	17%	7%	3%	6%	2%	51.5%	48.5%
12–16 Apr 2023	Resolve Strategic	327	29%	37%	15%	8%	2%	7%	2%	42.5%	57.5%
1 Feb – 3 Apr 2023	Newspoll	995	39%	33%	10%	8%	—N/a	—N/a	10%	50%	50%
12–16 Mar 2023	Resolve Strategic	325	24%	39%	14%	6%	1%	14%	2%	38.5%	61.5%
15–19 Feb 2023	Resolve Strategic	326	35%	39%	10%	9%	1%	0%	5%	46%	54%
17–22 Jan 2023	Resolve Strategic	328	30%	38%	11%	9%	1%	8%	2%	43.5%	56.5%
30 Nov – 4 Dec 2022	Resolve Strategic	328	34%	43%	7%	6%	1%	6%	2%	44%	56%
27 Jul – 3 Dec 2022	Newspoll	1,207	40%	33%	12%	6%	—N/a	—N/a	9%	51%	49%
26–30 Oct 2022	Resolve Strategic	328	32%	36%	16%	4%	2%	6%	4%	43%	57%
5–9 Oct 2022	Resolve Strategic	326	38%	31%	14%	6%	2%	7%	2%	50%	50%
14–18 Sep 2022	Resolve Strategic	327	31%	42%	7%	10%	2%	7%	2%	44%	56%
17–21 Aug 2022	Resolve Strategic	409	31%	37%	16%	6%	2%	6%	3%	42.5%	57.5%
21 Jun 2022	Roy Morgan	—N/a	—N/a	—N/a	—N/a	—N/a	—N/a	—N/a	—N/a	50%	50%
21 May 2022	Election		39.6%	27.4%	12.9%	7.5%	5.1%	2.1%	5.4%	54%	46%

=== Western Australia ===
==== Graphical summary ====
===== Polling =====
Date	Firm	Sample size	Primary vote							2pp vote	
Date	Firm	Sample size	ALP	L/NP	GRN	ONP	UAP	OTH	UND	ALP	L/NP
3 May 2025	Election		35.6%	31.5%	12.0%	7.6%	0.6%	12.7%	—	55.8%	44.2%
24 Apr – 1 May 2025	YouGov	287	32%	35%	15%	12%	—N/a	6%	—N/a	50%	50%
27–30 Apr 2025	DemosAU	409	34%	31%	15%	11%	—N/a	9%	—N/a	56%	44%
24–28 Apr 2025	Spectre Strategy/Dynata	—N/a	36%	32%	17%	7%	—N/a	8%	—N/a	54%	46%
18–22 Apr 2025	YouGov	149	40%	28%	12%	11%	—N/a	9%	—N/a	58%	42%
27 Mar – 17 Apr 2025	Newspoll	501	36%	34%	11%	9%	—N/a	10%	—N/a	54%	46%
11–15 Apr 2025	YouGov	128	37%	27%	12%	14%	—N/a	10%	—N/a	57%	43%
4–10 Apr 2025	YouGov	144	39%	29%	8%	11%	—N/a	13%	—N/a	56%	44%
28 Mar – 3 Apr 2025	YouGov	166	30%	36%	12%	9%	—N/a	13%	—N/a	49%	51%
14–19 Mar 2025	YouGov	111	43%	34%	8%	9%	—N/a	6%	—N/a	54%	46%
17 Jan – 15 Mar 2025	Freshwater Strategy	318	33%	35%	15%	—N/a	—N/a	17%	—N/a	52%	48%
7–13 Mar 2025	YouGov	155	42.5%	34.5%	8%	9%	—N/a	6%	—N/a	54%	46%
20 Jan – 7 Mar 2025	Newspoll	374	37%	34%	11%	9%	—N/a	9%	—N/a	54%	46%
4–5 March 2025	DemosAU	1126	36%	38%	11%	6%	—N/a	9%	—N/a	52%	48%
1 Oct – 8 Dec 2024	Resolve Strategic	460	30%	37%	12%	5%	—N/a	16%	—N/a	50%	50%
7 Oct – 6 Dec 2024	Newspoll	376	38%	37%	11%	5%	—N/a	9%	—N/a	54%	46%
30 Oct – 4 Nov 2024	DemosAU	948	34%	38%	14%	6%	—N/a	8%	—N/a	52%	48%
1–10 Oct 2024	Redbridge	1,514	35%	34%	—N/a	—N/a	—N/a	—N/a	—N/a	54.5%	45.5%
15 Jul – 20 Sep 2024	Newspoll	562	36%	39%	11%	4%	—N/a	10%	—N/a	52%	48%
15 Apr – 26 Jun 2024	Newspoll	156	34%	37%	11%	5%	—N/a	13%	—N/a	52%	48%
31 Jan – 22 Mar 2024	Newspoll	368	34%	39%	8%	6%	—N/a	13%	—N/a	49%	51%
31 Oct – 15 Dec 2023	Newspoll	364	37%	37%	11%	5%	—N/a	10%	—N/a	54%	46%
6–13 Dec 2023	RedBridge	1,203	39%	37%	12%	5%	—N/a	7%	—N/a	55.2%	44.8%
28 Aug – 12 Oct 2023	Newspoll	620	38%	38%	10%	6%	—N/a	8%	—N/a	53%	47%
1 Feb – 3 Apr 2023	Newspoll	474	40%	33%	11%	6%	—N/a	10%	—N/a	57%	43%
27 Jul – 3 Dec 2022	Newspoll	575	39%	34%	9%	7%	—N/a	11%	—N/a	55%	45%
21 Jun 2022	Roy Morgan	144	—N/a	—N/a	—N/a	—N/a	—N/a	—N/a	—N/a	50.5%	49.5%
21 May 2022	Election		36.8%	34.8%	12.5%	4%	2.3%	9.6%	—N/a	55%	45%

=== South Australia ===
==== Graphical summary ====
===== Polling =====
Date	Firm	Sample size	Primary vote							2pp vote	
Date	Firm	Sample size	L/NP	ALP	GRN	ONP	UAP	OTH	UND	ALP	L/NP
3 May 2025	Election		28.4%	38.3%	13.4%	6.25	3.2%	10.5%	—	59.2%	40.8%
24 Apr – 1 May 2025	YouGov	241	24%	35%	11%	15%	—N/a	15%	—N/a	53%	47%
18–22 Apr 2025	YouGov	126	21%	45%	10%	15%	—N/a	9%	—N/a	60%	40%
27 Mar – 17 Apr 2025	Newspoll	373	31%	34%	12%	9%	—N/a	14%	—N/a	55%	45%
11–15 Apr 2025	YouGov	113	30%	35%	8%	16%	—N/a	11%	—N/a	50%	50%
4–10 Apr 2025	YouGov	126	30%	32%	13%	12%	—N/a	13%	—N/a	51%	49%
28 Mar – 3 Apr 2025	YouGov	120	34%	35%	8%	7%	—N/a	16%	—N/a	51%	49%
14–19 Mar 2025	YouGov	307	33.5%	32.5%	10%	8%	—N/a	16%	—N/a	50.5%	49.5%
7–13 Mar 2025	YouGov	113	33.5%	33%	9.5%	8%	—N/a	16%	—N/a	51%	49%
20 Jan – 7 Mar 2025	Newspoll	271	37%	32%	11%	11%	—N/a	9%	—N/a	50%	50%
18–23 Feb 2025	DemosAU	440	35%	34%	11%	6%	—N/a	14%	—N/a	53%	47%
1 Oct – 8 Dec 2024	Resolve Strategic	359	34%	27%	12%	8%	—N/a	19%	—N/a	49.5%	50.5%
7 Oct – 6 Dec 2024	Newspoll	280	37%	35%	9%	7%	—N/a	12%	—N/a	53%	47%
15 Jul – 20 Sep 2024	Newspoll	374	35%	36%	9%	10%	—N/a	10%	—N/a	54%	46%
15 Apr – 26 Jun 2024	Newspoll	368	34%	34%	11%	12%	—N/a	9%	—N/a	53%	47%
31 Jan – 22 Mar 2024	Newspoll	278	33%	35%	11%	10%	—N/a	11%	—N/a	54%	46%
31 Oct – 15 Dec 2023	Newspoll	277	35%	38%	10%	6%	—N/a	11%	—N/a	55%	45%
28 Aug – 12 Oct 2023	Newspoll	362	30%	40%	10%	11%	—N/a	9%	—N/a	57%	43%
1 Feb – 3 Apr 2023	Newspoll	362	35%	38%	12%	5%	—N/a	10%	—N/a	56%	44%
27 Jul – 3 Dec 2022	Newspoll	449	35%	40%	12%	6%	—N/a	7%	—N/a	57%	43%
21 Jun 2022	Roy Morgan	103	—N/a	—N/a	—N/a	—N/a	—N/a	—N/a	—N/a	60.5%	39.5%
21 May 2022	Election		35.54%	34.46%	12.77%	4.83%	3.89%	8.51%	—N/a	53.97%	46.03%

=== Tasmania ===
==== Graphical summary ====
===== Polling =====
Date	Firm	Sample size	Primary vote							2pp vote	
Date	Firm	Sample size	L/NP	ALP	GRN	ONP	UAP	IND	OTH	ALP	L/NP
3 May 2025	Election		24.5%	36.6%	11.1%	6.0%	2.5%	18.0%	1.2%	63.3%	36.7%
10 Jul – 27 Aug 2024	Accent/RedBridge	107	35%	25%	12%	—N/a	—N/a	—N/a	28%	48%	52%
1 Feb – 26 May 2024	Accent/RedBridge	107	30%	29%	15%	—N/a	—N/a	—N/a	26%	54%	46%
28 Aug – 12 Oct 2023	Newspoll	366	25%	30%	13%	—N/a	—N/a	—N/a	27%	57%	43%
21 Jun 2022	Roy Morgan	—N/a	—N/a	—N/a	—N/a	—N/a	—N/a	—N/a	—N/a	63%	37%
21 May 2022	Election		32.9%	27.3%	12%	4%	1.8%	11.2%	10.8%	54.3%	45.7%

=== Northern Territory ===
==== Polling ====
Date	Firm	Sample size	Primary vote						2pp vote (Note: Some polling forms do not release two-party-preferred results. Results shown for polls conducted by these firms are manually calculated using preference flows in 2022.)	
Date	Firm	Sample size	CLP	ALP	GRN	ONP	IND	OTH	ALP	CLP
3 May 2025	Election		33.8%	37.9%	10.2%	7.7%	7.8%	2.6%	54.3%	45.7%
16–18 Nov 2023	Redbridge Group	601	40.4%	22.2%	11.1%	11.7%	7.2%	7.4%	43.9%	56.1%
21 May 2022	Election		29.4%	38.2%	13.1%	5.4%	1.3%	12.7%	55.5%	44.5%

== Electorate projections ==
Date	Brand	Projection Type	Sample Size	Seat Tally				Majority
Date	Brand	Projection Type	Sample Size	ALP	L/NP	GRN	OTH	Majority
3 May 2025	2025 Federal election			94	43	1	12	ALP 19
29 Apr – 1 May 2025	Freshwater Strategy	Monte Carlo	2,055	70	68	1	11	Hung (ALP 6 short)
1 Apr – 29 Apr 2025	YouGov (Note: Multiple projections were calculated. Displayed here is the central result. On the low end was a Coalition result of 45 seats, the Labor Party would get 76, the Greens would get 2 seats, Independents would get 13 seats and all others would get 2 seats. On the high end was a scenario in which the Coalition would win 53 seats, the Labor Party would get 85 seats, the Greens would get 5 seats, Independents would get 16 seats and all other parties would get 4 seats. In all of these predictions One Nation would not win any seats.)	MRP	10,822	84	47	3	16	ALP 9
14–16 Apr 2025	Freshwater Strategy	Monte Carlo	1,062	68	69	1	12	Hung (L/NP 7 short)
3 Feb – 1 Apr 2025	Accent Research/RedBridge Group	MRP	9,953	72	63	3	12	Hung (ALP 4 short)
28–30 Mar 2025	Freshwater Strategy	Monte Carlo	1,059	67	70	1	12	Hung (L/NP 6 short)
27 Feb – 26 Mar 2025	YouGov (Note: Multiple projections were calculated. Displayed here is the central result. On the low end was a Coalition result of 55 seats, the Labor Party would get 69, the Greens would get 1 seat, Independents would get 7 seats and all others would get 2 seats. On the high end was a scenario in which the Coalition would win 68 seats, the Labor Party would get 80 seats, the Greens would get 3 seats, Independents would get 11 seats and all other parties would get 2 seats. In all of these predictions One Nation would not win any seats.)	MRP	10,217	75	60	2	13	Hung (ALP 1 short)
13–15 Mar 2025	Freshwater Strategy	Monte Carlo	1,051	67	70	1	12	Hung (L/NP 6 short)
21–23 Feb 2025	Freshwater Strategy	Monte Carlo	1,038	66	71	1	12	Hung (L/NP 5 short)
22 Jan – 12 Feb 2025	YouGov (Note: Multiple projections were calculated. Displayed here is the central result. On the low end was a Coalition result of 65 seats, the Labor Party would get 59, the Greens would get 1 seat, Independents would get 7 seats and all others would get 2 seats. On the high end was a scenario in which the Coalition would win 80 seats, the Labor Party would get 72 seats, the Greens would get 3 seats, Independents would get 10 seats and all other parties would get 2 seats. In all of these predictions One Nation would not win any seats.)	MRP	8,732	66	73	1	10	Hung (L/NP 3 short)
29 Oct – 20 Nov 2024	Accent Research/RedBridge Group	MRP	4,909	65	71	4	10	Hung (L/NP 5 short)
10 Jul – 27 Aug 2024	Accent Research/RedBridge Group	MRP	5,976	69	68	3	10	Hung (ALP 7 short)
Feb – May 2024	Accent Research/RedBridge Group	MRP	4,040	77	60	3	11	ALP 2
21 May 2022	2022 Federal Election			77	58	4	12	ALP 2

== Exit polls ==
Date	Brand	Sample size	Seat tally				Majority
Date	Brand	Sample size	ALP	L/NP	GRN	OTH	Majority
3 May 2025	2025 Federal election		94	43	1	12	ALP 19
22–24 Apr 2025	The Daily Telegraph (Note: Seat totals shown on The Today Show.)	4,000	81	50	4	13	ALP 6
22 Apr 2025	Early voting begins						
21 May 2022	2022 Federal election		77	58	4	12	ALP 2

== Subpopulation results ==
=== By age ===
==== 18–34 ====
Date	Brand	Interview mode	Sample size	Primary vote							2PP vote	
Date	Brand	Interview mode	Sample size	L/NP	ALP	GRN	ONP	TOP	OTH	UND	ALP	L/NP
24–27 Apr 2025	Essential	Online	1,500	27%	30%	21%	6%	1%	8%	7%	54%	39%
9–14 Apr 2025	Essential	Online	1,500	22%	36%	24%	6%	2%	6%	5%	62%	33%
26–30 Mar 2025	Essential	Online	1,500	28%	29%	24%	5%	0%	9%	—N/a	56%	39%
18 Mar 2025	Essential	Online	1,500	31%	30%	20%	3%	1%	7%	—N/a	51%	41%
4 Mar 2025	Essential	Online	1,500	29%	30%	20%	5%	1%	11%	—N/a	53%	44%
18 Feb 2025	Essential	Online	1,500	29%	35%	17%	7%	3%	4%	—N/a	53%	42%
4 Feb 2025	Essential	Online	1,500	30%	31%	19%	7%	1%	7%	—N/a	52%	42%
21 Jan 2025	Essential	Online	1,500	32%	25%	23%	5%	4%	5%	—N/a	49%	44%
17 Dec 2024	Essential	Online	1,500	28%	36%	20%	1%	2%	8%	—N/a	54%	41%
3 Dec 2024	Essential	Online	1,500	32%	35%	14%	4%	2%	7%	—N/a	49%	45%
19 Nov 2024	Essential	Online	1,500	29%	29%	23%	4%	2%	7%	—N/a	51%	42%
5 Nov 2024	Essential	Online	1,500	28%	34%	19%	3%	4%	6%	—N/a	55%	39%
21 Mar 2023	Essential	Online	1,500	22%	30%	29%	3%	5%		—N/a	61%	34%
7 Mar 2023	Essential	Online	1,500	26%	34%	22%	4%	3%		—N/a	55%	38%
21 Feb 2023	Essential	Online	1,500	20%	31%	30%	6%	1%	5%	—N/a	60%	33%
7 Feb 2023	Essential	Online	1,500	17%	33%	33%	4%	3%	4%	—N/a	68%	26%
24 Jan 2023	Essential	Online	1,500	19%	32%	32%	6%	1%	5%	—N/a	65%	30%
13 Dec 2022	Essential	Online	1,500	25%	36%	24%	2%	4%	4%	—N/a	59%	35%

==== 35–54 ====
Date	Brand	Interview mode	Sample size	Primary vote							2pp vote	
Date	Brand	Interview mode	Sample size	L/NP	ALP	GRN	ONP	TOP	OTH	UND	ALP	L/NP
24–27 Apr 2025	Essential	Online	1,500	27%	34%	14%	11%	2%	8%	4%	54%	41%
9–14 Apr 2025	Essential	Online	1,500	28%	32%	12%	9%	3%	10%	5%	54%	41%
26–30 Mar 2025	Essential	Online	1,500	29%	32%	10%	12%	4%	6%	7	50%	43%
18 Mar 2025	Essential	Online	1,500	29%	29%	14%	12%	1%	10%	6	49%	45%
4 Mar 2025	Essential	Online	1,500	32%	30%	13%	11%	0%	10%	—N/a	50%	46%
18 Feb 2025	Essential	Online	1,500	30%	28%	14%	12%	0%	11%	—N/a	50%	46%
4 Feb 2025	Essential	Online	1,500	29%	28%	15%	10%	1%	11%	—N/a	50%	45%
21 Jan 2025	Essential	Online	1,500	30%	35%	9%	9%	3%	8%	—N/a	52%	43%
17 Dec 2024	Essential	Online	1,500	28%	29%	18%	9%	1%	11%	—N/a	50%	46%
3 Dec 2024	Essential	Online	1,500	30%	35%	13%	9%	1%	8%	—N/a	52%	43%
21 Mac 2023	Essential	Online	1,500	30%	40%	10%	6%	2%	9%	—N/a	54%	43%
7 Mac 2023	Essential	Online	1,500	27%	32%	12%	10%	3%	9%	—N/a	51%	42%
21 Feb 2023	Essential	Online	1,500	26%	33%	11%	7%	5%	9%	—N/a	50%	41%
7 Feb 2023	Essential	Online	1,500	26%	35%	13%	6%	2%	11%	—N/a	56%	36%

==== 55+ ====
Date	Brand	Interview mode	Sample size	Primary vote							2PP vote	
Date	Brand	Interview mode	Sample size	L/NP	ALP	GRN	ONP	TOP	OTH	UND	ALP	L/NP
24–27 Apr 2025	Essential	Online	1,500	41%	28%	4%	10%	3%	10%	3%	42%	54%
9–14 Apr 2025	Essential	Online	1,500	43%	27%	5%	11%	2%	10%	3%	39%	58%
26–30 Mar 2025	Essential	Online	1,500	44%	27%	4%	9%	2%	9%	4%	39%	57%
18 Mar 2025	Essential	Online	1,500	42%	30%	5%	8%	1%	10%	—N/a	42%	54%
4 Mar 2025	Essential	Online	1,500	41%	28%	7%	8%	1%	9%	—N/a	41%	53%
18 Feb 2025	Essential	Online	1,500	43%	28%	6%	7%	1%	12%	—N/a	43%	54%
4 Feb 2025	Essential	Online	1,500	45%	31%	5%	8%	1%	8%	—N/a	40%	58%
21 Jan 2025	Essential	Online	1,500	46%	28%	6%	8%	1%	9%	—N/a	40%	57%
17 Dec 2024	Essential	Online	1,500	45%	26%	5%	7%	1%	12%	—N/a	40%	55%
3 Dec 2024	Essential	Online	1,500	42%	27%	8%	9%	1%	11%	—N/a	42%	55%
19 Nov 2024	Essential	Online	1,500	45%	28%	5%	7%	1%	10%	—N/a	40%	56%
7 Mac 2023	Essential	Online	1,500	41%	31%	4%	6%	1%	10%	—N/a	42%	52%
21 Feb 2023	Essential	Online	1,500	40%	34%	4%	4%	2%	10%	—N/a	43%	50%
7 Feb 2023	Essential	Online	1,500	43%	30%	7%	7%	0%	9%	—N/a	44%	53%
24 Jan 2023	Essential	Online	1,500	40%	33%	4%	9%	0%	8%	—N/a	43%	51%
13 Dec 2022	Essential	Online	1,500	37%	36%	6%	8%	0%	10%	—N/a	47%	49%

== See also ==
- Electorate opinion polling and projections for the 2025 Australian federal election
- Opinion polling for the 2022 Australian federal election
- Opinion polling for the next Australian federal election
- Pre-election pendulum for the 2025 Australian federal election
