= Pre-election pendulum for the 2025 Australian federal election =

Psephological table

The Mackerras pendulum was devised by the Australian psephologist Malcolm Mackerras as a way of predicting the outcome of an election contested between two major parties in a Westminster style lower house legislature such as the Australian House of Representatives, which is composed of single-member electorates and which uses a preferential voting system such as a Condorcet method or IRV.

The pendulum works by lining up all of the seats held in Parliament for the government, the opposition and the crossbenches according to the percentage point margin they are held by on a two party preferred basis. This is also known as the swing required for the seat to change hands. Given a uniform swing to the opposition or government parties, the number of seats that change hands can be predicted.

Classification of seats as marginal, fairly safe or safe is applied by the independent Australian Electoral Commission using the following definition: "Where a winning party receives less than 56% of the vote, the seat is classified as 'marginal', 56–60% is classified as 'fairly safe' and more than 60% is considered 'safe'."

Some margins may differ from the results at the 2022 federal election or by-elections that have occurred following that election. In these cases, the margins used have been predicted (by Antony Green) based on the new boundaries following redistributions in New South Wales, Victoria, and Western Australia. The newly created Division of Bullwinkel is also included on this pendulum with a predicted margin as no election results yet exist for the division.

Listed below are the elected members at the time of the election, with those italicised having announced their retirement.

Government (78 seats)
Marginal
Gilmore	NSW	Fiona Phillips	ALP	0.2
Menzies	Vic	Keith Wolahan (LIB)	ALP	0.4
Lyons	Tas	Brian Mitchell	ALP	0.9
Lingiari	NT	Marion Scrymgour	ALP	1.7
Robertson	NSW	Gordon Reid	ALP	2.2
Paterson	NSW	Meryl Swanson	ALP	2.6
Tangney	WA	Sam Lim	ALP	2.8
Boothby	SA	Louise Miller-Frost	ALP	3.3
Chisholm	Vic	Carina Garland	ALP	3.3
Bullwinkel	WA	New division	ALP	3.3
Aston	Vic	Mary Doyle	ALP (b/e)	3.6 (Note: 2.6 Lib v ALP on new boundaries)
Parramatta	NSW	Andrew Charlton	ALP	3.7
McEwen	Vic	Rob Mitchell	ALP	3.8
Wills	Vic	Peter Khalil	ALP v GRN	4.6
Hunter	NSW	Daniel Repacholi	ALP	4.8
Reid	NSW	Sally Sitou	ALP	5.2
Blair	Qld	Shayne Neumann	ALP	5.2
Bruce	Vic	Julian Hill	ALP	5.3
Werriwa	NSW	Anne Stanley	ALP	5.3
Fairly safe
Shortland	NSW	Pat Conroy	ALP	6.0
Eden-Monaro	NSW	Kristy McBain	ALP	6.1
Macquarie	NSW	Susan Templeman	ALP	6.3
Dobell	NSW	Emma McBride	ALP	6.6
Dunkley	Vic	Jodie Belyea	ALP	6.8 (Note: b/e margin of 2.7)
Holt	Vic	Cassandra Fernando	ALP	7.1
Hawke	Vic	Sam Rae	ALP	7.6
Cooper	Vic	Ged Kearney	ALP v GRN	7.8
Corangamite	Vic	Libby Coker	ALP	7.8
Greenway	NSW	Michelle Rowland	ALP	7.9
Richmond	NSW	Justine Elliot	ALP	8.2
Whitlam	NSW	Stephen Jones	ALP	8.3
Solomon	NT	Luke Gosling	ALP	8.4
Pearce	WA	Tracey Roberts	ALP	8.8
Hindmarsh	SA	Mark Butler	ALP	8.9
Rankin	Qld	Jim Chalmers	ALP	9.1
Moreton	Qld	Graham Perrett	ALP	9.1
Swan	WA	Zaneta Mascarenhas	ALP	9.4
Isaacs	Vic	Mark Dreyfus	ALP	9.5
Macarthur	NSW	Mike Freelander	ALP	9.8
Cowan	WA	Anne Aly	ALP	9.9
Safe
Gorton	Vic	Brendan O'Connor	ALP	10.0
Hasluck	WA	Tania Lawrence	ALP	10.0
McMahon	NSW	Chris Bowen	ALP	10.5
Lilley	Qld	Anika Wells	ALP	10.5
Makin	SA	Tony Zappia	ALP	10.8
Bendigo	Vic	Lisa Chesters	ALP	11.2
Gellibrand	Vic	Tim Watts	ALP	11.2
Hotham	Vic	Clare O'Neil	ALP	11.6
Oxley	Qld	Milton Dick	ALP	11.6
Adelaide	SA	Steve Georganas	ALP	11.9
Barton	NSW	Linda Burney	ALP	12.0
Macnamara	Vic	Josh Burns	ALP	12.2
Jagajaga	Vic	Kate Thwaites	ALP	12.2
Canberra	ACT	Alicia Payne	ALP v GRN	12.2
Calwell	Vic	Maria Vamvakinou	ALP	12.4
Corio	Vic	Richard Marles	ALP	12.5
Lalor	Vic	Joanne Ryan	ALP	12.8
Spence	SA	Matt Burnell	ALP	12.9
Bean	ACT	David Smith	ALP	12.9
Ballarat	Vic	Catherine King	ALP	13.0
Maribyrnong	Vic	Bill Shorten	ALP	13.0
Blaxland	NSW	Jason Clare	ALP	13.0
Burt	WA	Matt Keogh	ALP	13.3
Kingsford Smith	NSW	Matt Thistlethwaite	ALP	13.3
Chifley	NSW	Ed Husic	ALP	13.6
Franklin	Tas	Julie Collins	ALP	13.7
Perth	WA	Patrick Gorman	ALP	14.4
Cunningham	NSW	Alison Byrnes	ALP	15.1
Watson	NSW	Tony Burke	ALP	15.2
Scullin	Vic	Andrew Giles	ALP	15.4
Fenner	ACT	Andrew Leigh	ALP	15.7
Kingston	SA	Amanda Rishworth	ALP	16.4
Sydney	NSW	Tanya Plibersek	ALP v GRN	16.5
Fraser	Vic	Daniel Mulino	ALP	16.6
Fremantle	WA	Josh Wilson	ALP	16.9
Brand	WA	Madeleine King	ALP	17.1
Grayndler	NSW	Anthony Albanese	ALP v GRN	17.3
Newcastle	NSW	Sharon Claydon	ALP	17.9

Opposition (57 seats)
Marginal
Deakin	Vic	Michael Sukkar	LIB	0.02
Bennelong	NSW	Jerome Laxale (ALP)	LIB	0.04
Sturt	SA	James Stevens	LIB	0.5
Moore	WA	Ian Goodenough (IND)	LIB	0.9
Canning	WA	Andrew Hastie	LIB	1.2
Bass	Tas	Bridget Archer	LIB	1.4
Casey	Vic	Aaron Violi	LIB	1.4
Dickson	Qld	Peter Dutton	LNP	1.7
Cowper	NSW	Pat Conaghan	NAT v IND	2.4
Bradfield	NSW	Paul Fletcher	LIB v IND	2.5
Banks	NSW	David Coleman	LIB	2.6
Monash	Vic	Russell Broadbent (IND)	LIB	2.9
Longman	Qld	Terry Young	LNP	3.1
Bonner	Qld	Ross Vasta	LNP	3.4
Leichhardt	Qld	Warren Entsch	LNP	3.4
Nicholls	Vic	Sam Birrell	NAT v IND	3.4
Hughes	NSW	Jenny Ware	LIB	3.5
Flynn	Qld	Colin Boyce	LNP	3.8
Wannon	Vic	Dan Tehan	LIB v IND	3.8
Forrest	WA	Nola Marino	LIB	4.2
Forde	Qld	Bert Van Manen	LNP	4.2
Petrie	Qld	Luke Howarth	LNP	4.4
Durack	WA	Melissa Price	LIB	4.7
Bowman	Qld	Henry Pike	LNP	5.5
Fairly safe
Lindsay	NSW	Melissa McIntosh	LIB	6.1
Flinders	Vic	Zoe McKenzie	LIB	6.2
Capricornia	Qld	Michelle Landry	LNP	6.6
O'Connor	WA	Rick Wilson	LIB	6.7
Hume	NSW	Angus Taylor	LIB	6.9
Groom	Qld	Garth Hamilton	LNP v IND	6.9
Berowra	NSW	Julian Leeser	LIB	7.6
Braddon	Tas	Gavin Pearce	LIB	8.0
La Trobe	Vic	Jason Wood	LIB	8.4
Fisher	Qld	Andrew Wallace	LNP	8.7
Fairfax	Qld	Ted O'Brien	LNP	9.0
McPherson	Qld	Karen Andrews	LNP	9.3
Riverina	NSW	Michael McCormack	NAT	9.7
Calare	NSW	Andrew Gee (IND)	NAT v IND	9.7
Safe
Grey	SA	Rowan Ramsey	LIB	10.1
Hinkler	Qld	Keith Pitt	LNP	10.1
Dawson	Qld	Andrew Willcox	LNP	10.4
Mitchell	NSW	Alex Hawke	LIB	10.5
Fadden	Qld	Cameron Caldwell	LNP	10.6 (Note: b/e margin of 13.4)
Page	NSW	Kevin Hogan	NAT	10.7
Wright	Qld	Scott Buchholz	LNP	10.9
Moncrieff	Qld	Angie Bell	LNP	11.2
Wide Bay	Qld	Llew O'Brien	LNP	11.3
Cook	NSW	Simon Kennedy	LIB	11.6 (Note: b/e margin of 21.3 v GRN)
Herbert	Qld	Phillip Thompson	LNP	11.8
Lyne	NSW	David Gillespie	NAT	13.8
New England	NSW	Barnaby Joyce	NAT	15.2
Farrer	NSW	Sussan Ley	LIB	16.3
Barker	SA	Tony Pasin	LIB	16.6
Parkes	NSW	Mark Coulton	NAT	18.2
Mallee	Vic	Anne Webster	NAT	19.0
Gippsland	Vic	Darren Chester	NAT	20.6
Maranoa	Qld	David Littleproud	LNP	22.1
Crossbench (15 seats)
Fowler	NSW	Dai Le	IND v ALP	1.1
Curtin	WA	Kate Chaney	IND v LIB	1.3
Kooyong	Vic	Monique Ryan	IND v LIB	2.2
Ryan	Qld	Elizabeth Watson-Brown	GRN v LNP	2.6
Goldstein	Vic	Zoe Daniel	IND v LIB	3.3
Mackellar	NSW	Sophie Scamps	IND v LIB	3.3
Brisbane	Qld	Stephen Bates	GRN v LNP	3.7
Melbourne	Vic	Adam Bandt	GRN v ALP	6.5
Wentworth	NSW	Allegra Spender	IND v LIB	6.8
Indi	Vic	Helen Haines	IND v LIB	8.9
Warringah	NSW	Zali Steggall	IND v LIB	9.4
Griffith	Qld	Max Chandler-Mather	GRN v LNP	10.5
Mayo	SA	Rebekha Sharkie	CA v LIB	12.3
Kennedy	Qld	Bob Katter	KAP v LNP	13.1
Clark	Tas	Andrew Wilkie	IND v ALP	20.8
